= Johan Martin Holst =

Norwegian surgeon and professor (1892–1953)

- Born: 23 June 1892; Kristiania, Norway
- Died: 17 February 1953 (aged 60)
- Occupations: physician, a surgeon and military doctor
- Parent: Peter Fredrik Holst
- Relatives: Johan Throne Holst (uncle); Johan Bernhard Hjort (brother-in-law); Henning Throne-Holst (cousin); Harald Throne-Holst (cousin)

Johan Martin Holst (23 June 1892 – 17 February 1953) was a Norwegian physician, surgeon, and military doctor.

== Early life ==
Holst was born in Kristiania to physician Peter Fredrik Holst and Kirstine Eleonore Sartz Fürst. He was a nephew of Johan Throne Holst, and thus cousin of Henning Throne-Holst and Harald Throne-Holst.

== Career ==
Holst graduated as physician in 1916, and as dr.med. in 1924. From 1930 he was appointed professor of surgery at Rikshospitalet. He published works on treatment of the Basedow disease and gastrointestinal diseases, and on surgical treatment of pulmonary tuberculosis. He headed the Norwegian Army Medical Service from 1940, with the rank of colonel. During the German occupation of Norway, he was among the early resistance pioneers (Milorg), and after he had to flee from the country, he was brought to London, where he served as head of the medical service of the exiled Norwegian military forces.

== Personal life ==
He married Sofie Steen in 1920.
