= Grosskreutz =

Grosskreutz, Großkreutz or Groß Kreutz, meaning "great cross" in German, may refer to:

== People ==
- Gaige Grosskreutz (born 1993), wounded in the 2020 Kenosha unrest shooting
- Kevin Großkreutz (born 1988), German footballer
- Max Grosskreutz (1906–1994), Australian speedway rider

== Places ==
- Groß Kreutz, municipality in Brandenburg, Germany
