= Johan Bernhard Hjort =

Norwegian supreme court lawyer (1895–1969)

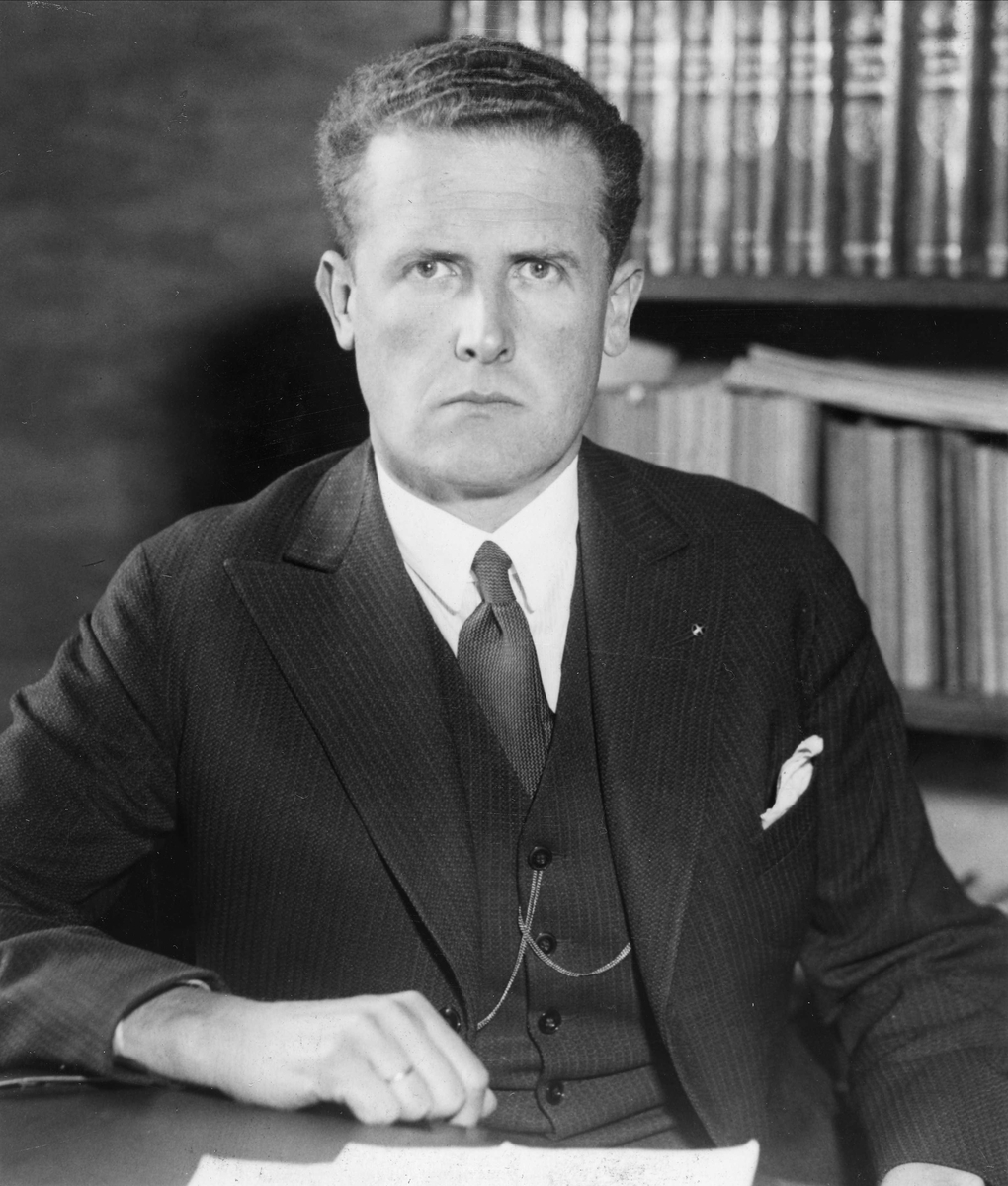
- Johan Bernhard Hjort (circa 1930)
- Born: 25 February 1895; Christiania, Norway
- Died: 23 February 1969 (aged 73); Oslo, Norway
- Burial place: Ullern kirkegård
- Occupations: Lawyer, politician
- Political party: Nasjonal Samling (1933-1937)
- Spouse: Anna Cathrine Holst (1920-)
- Children: Wanda Hjort Heger; Johan Hjort; Peter F. Hjort; Kirsti Hjort; Haldis Hjort; Helge Bernhard Hjort
- Father: Johan Hjort

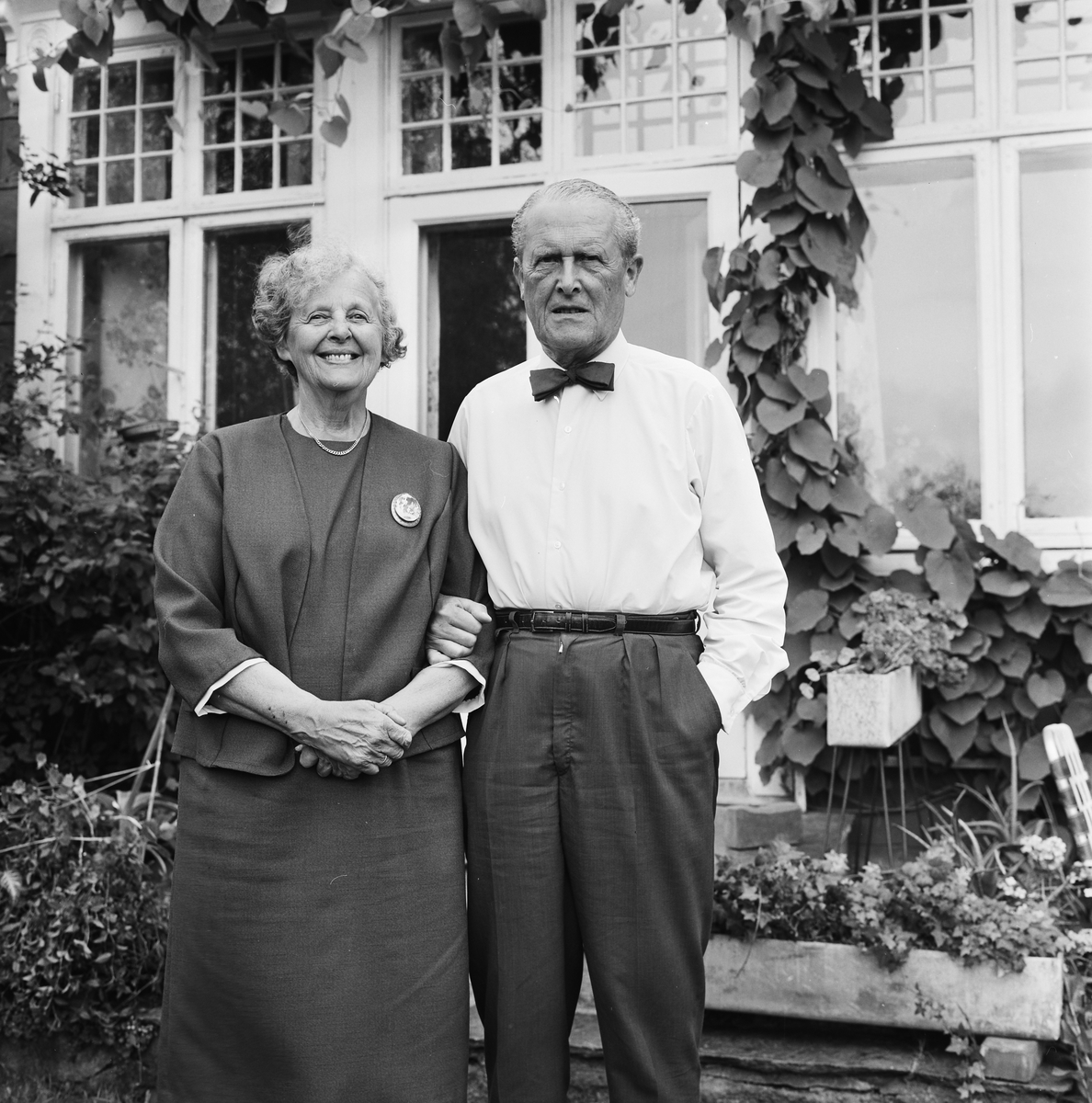
Johan Bernhard Hjort and his wife Anna Cathrine, Bestum (1967)

Johan Bernhard Hjort (25 February 1895 – 24 February 1969) was a Norwegian supreme court lawyer. He is known for co-founding Nasjonal Samling in 1933, his later resistance work against Nazi Germany, including his work to help Scandinavian prisoners, as well as for his role as one of the country's leading defence attorneys after the war.

Hjort joined Harald Nørregaard's law firm in 1932 and after 1945 continued the firm as Advokatfirmaet Hjort. He was deputy leader of Nasjonal Samling from 1933, and from 1935 he served as the leader of Hirden, the party's paramilitary wing. However, he broke with the party in 1937 and was arrested by the Gestapo in 1941. He was then sent to Germany, where he was interned at the Gross Kreutz estate together with Didrik Arup Seip, and carried out resistance work that saved the lives of many Scandinavian prisoners. Among other things, the group at Gross Kreutz collected lists of names of Scandinavian prisoners, and these formed the basis for the rescue operation with the white buses.

After the war, he was notable as a defender of homosexual rights and as a defender of controversial artists' freedom of expression, as in the so-called Red Ruby controversy. From 1961 until his death, he was chairman of Riksmålsforbundet. As a public figure, he stood for a liberal worldview, sharply criticizing the Labor Party governments of the 1950s and 1960s.

== Family and background ==
He was the son of marine biologist, oceanographer, and director of fisheries, Johan Hjort and his wife Wanda Maria von der Marwitz. His mother was of Prussian nobility. During Johan's childhood, the family lived in Bergen, and his parents divorced when he was in his teens. The children moved with their mother to Bestum in Oslo.

In 1920, he married Anna Cathrine Holst. His two sisters Astrid and Wanda soon after married German men: the two brothers Rüdiger and Georg Conrad Graf von der Goltz, and moved to Germany. Astrid's husband, Rüdiger von der Goltz, was from 1936 a member of the Reichstag for the NSDAP. The sisters' father-in-law was the prominent General Rüdiger von der Goltz, who led the Freikorps in the Baltic States and the German intervention in the Finnish Civil War.

Hjort had six children with his wife: social worker and resistance member Wanda Hjort Heger, Supreme Court lawyer Johan Hjort, doctor, professor and politician Peter F. Hjort, engineer Helge Hjort, pianist Kirsti Hjort and psychologist Haldis Hjort. He is the grandfather of publisher Anders Heger and district court judge Kim Heger.

== Early life and career ==
Hjort began studying law and graduated in 1919 with a cand.jur., equivalent to a master's degree. Shortly after graduating, Hjort was employed by the law firm Bredal, Fougner and Schjødt, which at the time was one of Oslo's leading firms. After a year, he was asked to leave in order to gain more experience as a temporary judge. Hjort then worked for a year in Aker before joining the Union of Norwegian Cities (Norges Byforbund, now KS) as a legal consultant.

Following the First World War, Norway experienced significant economic troubles. Through his position at the Union of Norwegian Cities, Hjort gained in-depth knowledge of the poor finances of the municipalities and the state. Together with his friend Trygve Hoff (later editor of Farmand), Hjort prepared an alternative state budget in 1923 to improve the budget overview. As a result, he was eventually tasked with an investigation assignment for Johan Egeberg Mellbye in the Farmers' Party and a position as an advisor for the Lykke government under Finance Minister Fredrik Ludvig Konow.

As Hjort prepared his economic reports, focused on the state's poor finances and the politicians' inability to balance the budget deficit, his confidence in the existing non-socialist parties weakened. In 1927, Hjort joined the Fatherland League and was elected to the Aker county council for the Conservative Party. In the 1930 parliamentary elections, Hjort campaigned for a non-socialist victory, and attacking revolutionary aspects of the Labour Party. Responding to an article by Edvard Bull Sr. (Labor Party politician and later Foreign Minister) in the journal Vor Verden, Hjort argued that one could not give power to an admitted revolutionary party even if it won the election, as this would be tantamount to "bolshevism by parliamentary means" ("bolsjevismen ad parlamentarisk vei").

Though the non-socialists won the election in 1930, the economic crisis (now global in the form of the Great Depression) was becoming increasingly serious and unemployment was rising. In the spring of 1931, this led to a major lockout by employers. The crisis and what Hjort perceived as a weak response from the establishment parties lead him towards the more radical right-wing.

In 1932, Hjort was admitted as a partner in Harald Nørregaard's law firm, which was subsequently renamed Nørregaard & Hjort. Nørregaard was regarded as one of Norway's leading supreme court lawyers of his time. Hjort's biographer, Ivo de Figueiredo, writes: "In Nørregaard he found a role model. The elderly lawyer was known for his eloquence in court. It was said of him that he dominated the courtroom with his presence, and that his warm voice wrapped itself around the Court of Appeal like velvet." Nørregaard died after six years of partnership in 1938. Nørregaard and Hjort had a somewhat distant family relationship - Nørregaard's grandmother was married to Hjort's great-grandfather.

== Involvement with Nasjonal Samling ==
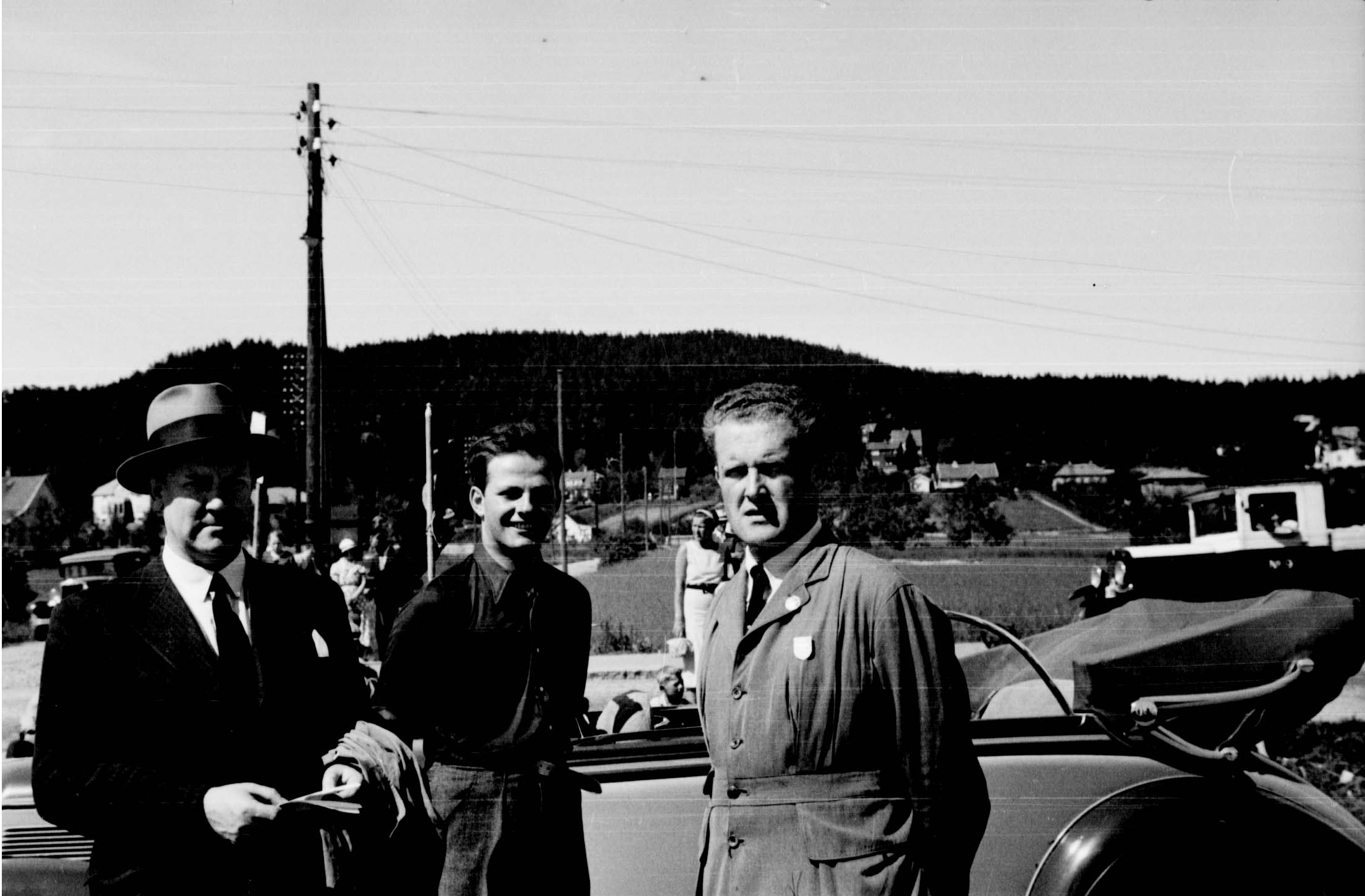
Hjort (right), with Vidkun Quisling (left), ca. 1936

=== Beginning ===
Hjort was in contact with a circle of concerned establishment figures, to which Vidkun Quisling had also been invited. From the spring of 1930, they met for dinner at Frederik Prytz's house at Hafrsfjordsgaten 7. In May 1931, Quisling was appointed Minister of Defense in Peder L. Kolstad's government, formed by the Farmers' Party. During the throne speech in April 1932, Quisling gave a speech in the Storting in which he accused the two socialist parties (the Labor Party, DNA, and the Communist Party of Norway, NKP) of treasonous connections with the Soviet Union. The circle around Prytz attempted to use the speech to promote Quisling's political position and weaken the socialist parties.

In May 1932, the circle from Hafrsfjordsgate formed an informal group called "Polkom"; from Hjort's office, this group worked to exploit Quisling's accusations and information against the two socialist parties. This marked the start of Hjort's period of close collaboration with Quisling. Polkom's work was aimed at getting the non-socialist parties to declare DNA and NKP illegal, as they aimed to overthrow the system. During the summer and fall, Hjort developed a plan, based on constitutional theory, for a coup d'état carried out by the government against the Storting. Under this plan, parliamentarism was to be abolished and the threat from the socialists neutralized.

Hjort's basis for taking such drastic action was his sense of crisis. As Hjort saw it, the plan was constitutionally legitimate, and he saw a unifying anti-socialist leader in Vidkun Quisling. To showcase the constitutional legality of the coup d'état plan, Hjort referred to 1814, 1884 and 1905; three major years in Norwegian political history. However, the success of the plan depended on broad support, and to ensure this, a meeting was held on 26 October 1932 at the home of landowner Carl Otto Løvenskiold at Bærums Verk.

Present at this meeting were the leaders of various non-socialist parties and organizations. The meeting later became known as the "Wednesday meeting". Hjort introduced and presented the plan, but it was negatively received by the old Conservative prime minister Jens Bratlie, and it also led to prominent supporter Johan Throne Holst (noteworthy industrialist and CEO of Freia) withdrawing. Over the course of the fall and winter, the plan collapsed as Quisling and new Prime Minister Jens Hundseid clashed over the pacifist Captain Kullmann in what became known as the "Kullmann case". This was the first blow to Hjort's faith in Quisling.

=== Founding of Nasjonal Samling ===
Jens Hundseid's government fell in March 1933, and Polkom – in which Hjort played a central role – explored the possibility of a broad non-socialist coalition that would include the Farmers' Party, the Fatherland League, and others. However, a lack of interest in this front meant that on 17 May, in the newspaper Tidens Tegn, Quisling presented a program for a separate party, Nasjonal Samling. As de facto deputy leader of the new party, Hjort threw himself into the election campaign for the 1933 general election, in which his wife Anna Cathrine also participated.

The newly founded party did not get any MPs. Hjort lamented Quisling's leadership style, which he felt was unclear and amateurish. In the spring of 1934, NS made a new attempt at non-socialist cooperation, led by Hjort. However, these negotiations were unsuccessful, and in March 1935 the Labor Party formed a government with the support of the Farmers' Party.

In addition to his legal practice, Hjort continued to work organizationally for NS. He also investigated how laws and the Constitution must be amended to meet "the demands of the new era". He also put forward a proposal in the spring of 1935 to reintroduce the "Jew clause" (a historical ban excluding Jews from Norway) in the Constitution. Despite the fact that Hjort was a co-founder and de facto deputy leader of NS, his ideas about the organization of the state were in theory within the limits of democracy. Hjort was also not a supporter of a planned economy, and he distanced himself from German National Socialism.

In March 1935, Hjort took over the leadership of Hirden, who partly acted as security guards at NS meetings, but whose primary task was to discipline and educate its members. Hirden was modeled after the German Sturmabteilung (SA). With his Prussian background, sergeant training from the Armed Forces and natural authority, Hjort was made for the role. Hirden was the activist core of NS, with a couple hundred members. At a meeting in Gjøvik on Ascension Day 1936, Hjort addressed several thousand attendees and opened with "Countrymen, traitors, monkeys and others". The meeting ended in chaos and street fighting, the so-called Torgslaget.

=== Internal struggle and break with NS ===
Johan Bernhard Hjort had little patience with people he regarded as "fools" or amateurish, and he believed there were many of them in NS. In addition, Hjort was an able organizer, and a good speaker. Quisling's lack of these qualities was very problematic for the party. A battle for the leadership of NS was therefore inevitable.

In the summer of 1936, Hjort traveled to Germany to seek support for NS. Probably with the help of his German brothers-in-law, he met Heinrich Himmler, among others. He was well received, but received no financial support. However, Himmler offered to link NS to the German SS, which Hjort is said to have rejected.

Back in Norway, he became involved in the NS action against Trotsky. Hirden broke into Konrad Knudsen's house in Hønefoss, where Trotsky lived, and took a number of documents that Hjort handed over to the police. The case attracted enormous attention and was for NS a successful provocation. NS's fight against communism and Judaism took center stage, and Trotsky was eventually expelled.

In the election campaign before the 1936 general election, Hjort gave everything. At the same time, he was under pressure from internal intrigues in NS and the knowledge that he was neglecting his family in favor of politics. However, NS had a poor showing in the election and was once again left without MPs. In the internal dispute that followed, Hjort proposed far-reaching organizational changes. Hjort's proposals were rejected, and in the fall of 1936 the conflict between him and NS intensified. In February 1937, he left the party, and several other key figures left NS at this time as well.

== Prelude to war ==
On 14 June 1937, Himmler visited the lawyer Rüdiger von der Goltz (Hjort's brother-in-law) to meet Hjort and be briefed on the National Socialist movement in Norway.

The years of hectic political activity had a negative effect on Hjort's law practice; his finances had been supported by his wife's uncle Johan Throne Holst, a debt he now had to work to pay off. Hjort kept in contact with other NS breakaways, and he wrote for the right-wing, nationalist and NS-critical journal Ragnarok.

The Kristallnacht of 9 November 1938 shocked Hjort; "Germany's friends are looking for an honorable defense and a reasonable motive for all this. They refuse to believe that German order and discipline have come to an end and that the German state must give the people this kind of circus performance for the sake of domestic peace." At the same time, Hjort had accepted the Nuremberg Laws and argued in the autumn of 1938 that a race war was looming, with the "Nordic tribe in the world decreasing in numbers, while other races multiply like rats".

In September 1939, World War II broke out, and in November the Winter War began with the Soviet Union's attack on Finland. Germany had signed a non-aggression pact with the Soviets and therefore remained passive, which was a hard blow for Hjort. Several of Hjort's friends, including his father, traveled to Finland as volunteers. He considered going himself, but decided against it for the sake of his family. Up until 1940, Hjort was engaged in strengthening the armed forces, and he and his two sons received voluntary military training themselves.

== German invasion ==
On 9 April 1940, Germany invaded Norway. Hjort was a conscripted sergeant and reported for duty, but like so many others, he was told to wait. In the evening, he heard his former colleague Vidkun Quisling declare on the radio that a new national government had taken over. Greatly provoked, Hjort contacted other pro-German Norwegians: Victor Mogens, Per Imerslund, Albert Wiesener, Otto Sverdrup Engelschiøn and Hans S. Jacobsen. Hjort's plan was to contact the Germans to stop Quisling's coup attempt.

On 14 April, the Administrative Council was established, and Quisling's coup attempt had failed. During the spring, Hjort began working to help and release the Norwegian prisoners of war. By the end of May 1940, 11,000 Norwegian prisoners of war had been released. However, the work came at a price, as the officers had to swear an oath not to take up arms against the occupying forces. Hjort was later criticized for this, and a number of officers, led by Otto Ruge, chose captivity instead. Hjort was also an active writer in Tidens Tegn. He was most outspoken in Ragnarok, where he wrote that one had to be optimistic and build the country; as "then both Norway's independence and a friendly relationship with our kindred people in the south will come as a matter of course."

In the unclear situation after the invasion, Hjort was well suited as a middleman as he was both a respected Supreme Court lawyer and fluent in German. Hjort also dealt with finding work for the released prisoners and with insurance settlements after the fighting through the War Injury Insurance Fund. During the summer of 1940, Hjort was constantly involved in the various negotiations between the German and Norwegian sides. These culminated in Terboven's proposal for a Riksråd. Hjort was open to a position on this council, but withdrew when Terboven demanded that NS be represented.

As late as August 1940, Hjort attempted to bring the major parties together, and he had meetings with representatives of the Conservative Party, the Labor Party, the Liberal Party and the Farmers' Party. He was not alone in his desire to make the best of the situation. Einar Gerhardsen had similar ideas, but they were quickly torpedoed by the Germans when Terboven declared on 25 September that Nasjonal Samling was Norway's only legal political party.

=== Imprisonment ===
With clear lines drawn after Terboven's speech, Hjort withdrew from party politics for the last time and devoted all his time to law. With his knowledge of German affairs, he was a resource for other Norwegian lawyers. There were many cases when Norwegian resistance fighters needed defence counsel. It was a legal voyage through increasingly troubled waters; the Supreme Court was dismissed, and the occupation forces were constantly pushing for lawyers to adapt to the new conditions. He also held lectures in the German-controlled Norwegian Broadcasting Corporation, alongside individuals like Albert Wiesener, Jonas Lie, and Ranik Halle.

In January 1941, the Norwegian Bar Association was pressured to include an article in the Norwegian Legal Gazette on "The development of constitutional law in Norway" by Rudolf Schiedermair, Terboven's legal adviser. Hjort took it upon himself to write a response with the assistance of other Norwegian lawyers and Frede Castberg. Hjort's response was diplomatic in form, but nevertheless ruthless when Hjort concluded that the Germans had violated international law by their conduct during the occupation, and that Quisling had committed a coup d'état.

Hjort must have known what such public criticism of the occupying forces would lead to, and he was arrested on 21 October 1941. Hjort was first detained at Møllergata 19 (Oslo's main police station at the time) and then transferred to the Grini prison camp in December 1941. The time in solitary confinement at Møllergata 19 was a difficult period for Hjort, but the community at Grini with many acquaintances made his imprisonment easier. In fact, many of the most important of the Norwegian social elite were at Grini. After the liberation, it was seen as a badge of honor to have been imprisoned there. From then on, Johan Bernhard Hjort was definitely considered to have been on "the right side" of the war.

In Germany, his brothers-in-law tried to get him released, and Rüdiger was allowed to meet Terboven in November 1941. But the German Reichskommissar was outraged and stated: "The pig sits down and writes an article" (German: "Das Schwein setzt sich nieder und schreibt einen Artikel".) Hjort's attempts to speak out against the occupation forces were not taken kindly. At the same time, his arrest was also linked to his brother-in-law Johan Holst's escape to Sweden.

On 6 February 1942, Hjort was sent to Germany on the prison ship "Donau" and placed in the prison at Alexanderplatz in Berlin. Hjort's brother-in-law Rüdiger approached Himmler, and the SS commander was open to an agreement that resulted in Hjort being released, but having to stay in Germany with his family until the end of the war.

In May, Rüdiger was allowed to meet Hjort to explain the conditions, but Hjort's family in Norway, Anna Cathrine and the six children were reluctant to settle in Germany.

Anna Cathrine Hjort was allowed to meet her husband in Berlin, but she and the children were equally dismissive. There were rumors and many people believed that Hjort was now willing to cooperate with the occupiers. Hjort was released, but in so-called civilian internment. Rüdiger got him a job as a legal consultant in the oil company Continentale Oehl Gesellschaft in Berlin. By October, after strong German pressure, the family had given in and settled on the Gross Kreutz estate in the village of the same name 20 km west of Potsdam. The estate was owned by Hjort's cousin Bodo von der Marwitz.

== Resistance work ==
While they were in their "open captivity" as civilian internees in Germany, the Hjort family tried to make the best of the situation. In consultation with the Norwegian seaman priests in Hamburg, Arne Berge and Conrad Vogt-Svendsen, their daughter Wanda took the initiative to visit Norwegian prisoners. She began with a visit to the Sachsenhausen concentration camp. Prison camps were visited, and the prisoners were given parcels, and messages and names were smuggled out.

The first prisoner Wanda visited was Didrik Arup Seip, who was eventually released and interned on the same terms as Hjort. He moved with his family to the Gross Kreutz estate near Potsdam, where Hjort and his family also lived and joined in the work for the prisoners.

From January 1944, the family established contact with the Norwegian diplomat Niels Christian Ditleff in Stockholm. Through Swedish diplomatic channels, they sent him around 50 reports with lists of names. Seip and his children were the leaders in this prisoner work, but Hjort himself also became involved as a defender of Norwegian prisoners in Germany. Among the prisoners he assisted were members of the Wollweber group.

On 26 October 1944, Ditleff received a memo from Hjort requesting that the Norwegian prisoners be taken to Sweden, and shortly afterwards Ditleff sent a memo reporting German plans to liquidate all prisoners before the end of the war. These notes were crucial to the Swedish rescue operation known as the White Buses. It is estimated that this operation saved 15,345 prisoners from death in concentration and prisoner camps; of these, 7,795 were Scandinavian. In particular, 423 Danish Jews were saved from the Theresienstadt concentration camp inside German-occupied territory of Czechoslovakia, contributing significantly to the fact that the casualties among Danish Jews during the Holocaust were among the lowest of the occupied countries of Europe.

In February 1945, Folke Bernadotte came to Berlin to meet German leaders, including Himmler. This initiative was intended to rescue the Scandinavian prisoners, and Bernadotte also met with the circle from Gross Kreutz. Hjort and Vogt-Svendsen had made sketches of the camps and a note on how the collection of the prisoners in Neuengamme could be done in practical terms, and Bernadotte used this as a basis for his action.

By the end of April, most of the Norwegian prisoners had been transported home, but Johan Bernhard Hjort and his son Helge remained at Gross Kreutz. They would not leave Germany until the last Norwegian prisoners were out. There were still 1,100 Norwegian officers left; Hjort had already met them in February and promised General Ruge to act as liaison until the prisoners could be sent home. The Hjort family's overview of the Norwegian prisoners was the basis for the repatriation office in Hamburg (under the leadership of Bulukin) to pick up General Ruge and other Norwegian officers from Luckenwalde around 12 May 1945. The Norwegian officers were transferred from Schildberg to Luckenwalde in February 1945. Luckenwalde was captured by Soviet forces in April 1945 and General Ruge was sent to Moscow.

== Liberation and purge ==
Soviet forces reached Gross Kreutz at the end of April or beginning of May. The German farm manager was beaten to death by the Eastern European forced laborers on the estate. After Germany's capitulation, the Soviet forces decided that the Norwegian officers should be sent home via Murmansk, but Hjort and other Norwegians found the prisoners and ensured that they were sent directly home to Norway. In early June, Hjort himself was back in Norway after almost three years in Germany.

The return home was hardly exactly what Johan Bernhard Hjort had imagined. The period after liberation proved to be difficult for him. Despite his great efforts on behalf of Norwegian prisoners, his own imprisonment and his defiant article in the Norwegian Legal Gazette, many people were still skeptical about other aspects of his past. Hjort's actions up until 25 September 1940 could be interpreted as an attempt to find a third way, between Quisling's treason and the London government's resistance to the German occupiers. The mood after the liberation was not sympathetic, and several of his supporters from 1940 were convicted in the treason trial. Hjort vigorously defended himself against accusations of a lack of "national attitude". He wrote about the articles from 1940 that they had to be seen in the light of the special situation.

Because of his past in the NS and his connection to the administrative council, he had to withdraw from a proposed position in the bar association. Hjort's friend Gustav Heiberg was appointed chairman of the "Commission of Inquiry of 1945" (Norwegian: Undersøkelseskommisjonen av 1945), and Hjort asked Heiberg for a statement in his favor. Heiberg first acknowledged Hjort's work for the resistance, but then wrote about the election in the lawyers' association:

"As far as you are concerned, it would be enough for me not to vote for you that you had been a member of NS as late as 1937 and that you had still been so German-oriented (by which I do not mean odious) in the early days of the war as your statements in Tidens Tegn indicated." (Norwegian: "For deres vedkommende vilde det for meg være nok til ikke å stemme på Dem at De overhodet hadde vært medlem av NS såpass sent som i 1937 og at De endnu i krigens første tid hadde vært såpass tyskorientert (dermed mener jeg ikke odiøst) som Deres uttalelser i Tidens Tegn gav uttrykk for.")

Johan Bernhard Hjort was not convicted, but on the contrary was given full redress by the Lawyers' Association. But something remained: His actions before the war and in 1940. As late as 1954, he spoke out in Verdens Gang, where he wrote about his past in NS: "Is it not written somewhere that there should be greater joy over one sinner who repents than over many who never had the need for repentance?". In his view of the settlement, Hjort was in line with Johannes Andenæs and the newspaper Morgenbladet in what became known as the "silk front".

== Post-war career ==
After the war, Hjort fought as a supreme court lawyer for the artistic freedom of controversial artists and for the natural legal rights of homosexuals. In 1957, in one of the most famous and widely debated court cases in Norwegian post-war history, Hjort was the defense lawyer for novelist Agnar Mykle, who was accused of immoral and obscene writing in his books. Hjort was a long-term leader of Riksmålsforbundet, an association that fought for the free evolution of the Norwegian language, in the direction of Riksmål. He was a prolific writer and lecturer and a frequent contributor to public debate. Among his books are Justismord (1952), Dømt med rette? (1958), and Demokrati og statsmakt (1963). He also translated Kipling's Just So Stories into Norwegian.

== See also ==
- Wanda Hjort Heger, Hjort's eldest daughter
