= Anders Heger =

Norwegian publisher and writer

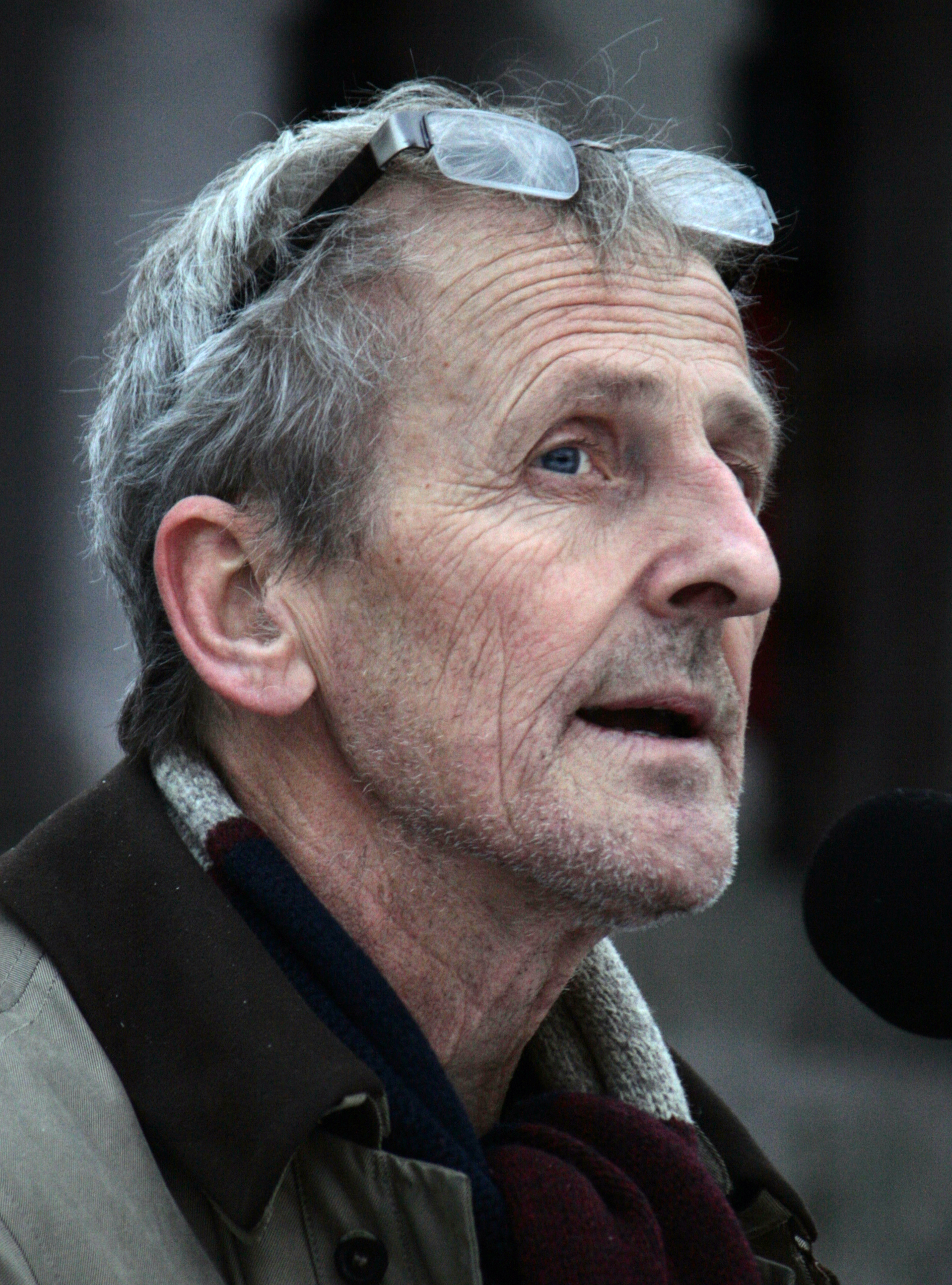
Anders Heger (2011)

Anders Heger (born 10 July 1956) is a Norwegian publisher and writer, and is one of the six children of Wanda Hjort Heger and Bjørn Heger.

In 1982, Heger started Radio Nova, the first student radio in Norway. In 1985, he wrote a book about the juridical process against the Norwegian writer Agnar Mykle, and in 1999 wrote Et diktet liv, a biography about Agnar Mykle, which received the Brage Prize (comparable in Norway to a Pulitzer Prize). Heger's grandfather, Johan Bernhard Hjort, was Mykle's defense attorney.

Heger became director of the Norwegian publishing company Cappelen (owned by the Swedish mediahouse Bonnier) in 1991. Heger is described in the media as "the most powerful man in the bookpublishing industry in Norway".

His interests include cross-country skiing.

Awards
Preceded by Christian Rugstad	Recipient of the Brage Prize, open class 1999	Succeeded by Karin Fossum
