= Peter F. Hjort =

Norwegian professor of medicine and politician

Peter Fredrik Holst Hjort (23 March 1924 – 1 January 2011) was a Norwegian professor of medicine and politician for the Labour Party. He is best known for his work to establish the University of Tromsø, and for his work with public health.

== Personal life ==
He was born in Kristiania as a son of barrister and right-wing political figure Johan Bernhard Hjort (1895–1969) and Anna Cathrine Holst (1895–1992). His grandfathers were fisheries director Johan Hjort and professor of medicine Peter Fredrik Holst. He was a brother of Johan Hjort and Wanda Hjort Heger. In 1948 he married Tone Seip (1926–2001), a daughter of academic Didrik Arup Seip. He spent the years 1998 to 2001 nursing his wife, who had sustained critical brain damage during an operation. The couple had four children.

== Career ==
Hjort finished his secondary education in 1942. The same year he was moved to civil interment in Groß Kreutz, together with his father and their entire family, due to his father's criticisms of the German occupation.

He studied medicine and graduated from the University of Oslo with the cand.med. degree in 1950. In the following decade he worked with medicine in Gloppen, Lillehammer, and at Rikshospitalet in Oslo. He also had research fellowships at the University of Oslo as well as a Fulbright Scholarship. He took the dr.med. degree in 1957 and became a specialist in internal medicine in 1959. He cited his own academic master as being professor Paul Owren. He was hired as assistant physician at Ullevål Hospital in 1960. After being a visiting professor at the University of Southern California in 1963, he was appointed as docent of hematology at the University of Oslo in 1964 and professor in 1969, being stationed at Rikshospitalet.

In 1969 he was named as interim board chairman of the University of Tromsø, which was under planning. When the University of Tromsø was finally opened in 1972, Hjort was elected and served as the first rector. He withdrew in 1973, and returned to Oslo. Between 1975 and 1994 he led health research projects in NAVF and the State Institute of Public Health. In addition to hematology he became an expert in geriatrics and gerontology during his career. From 1977 to 1994 he worked part-time as a physician at Ullern Retirement Home, and from 1994 to 2000 he again worked at the University of Tromsø. While working in Oslo he resided in Bærum Municipality and was active in the Labour Party there.

He was decorated as a Commander of the Order of St. Olav in 1974, received honorary degrees at the University of Tromsø (1982), Uppsala University (1992) and the Norwegian School of Sport Sciences (1998), and was a member of the Norwegian Academy of Science and Letters (from 1969) and the Royal Norwegian Society of Sciences and Letters (since 1979). He died on New Year's Day 2011 in Bærum.

Academic offices
New office	Rector of the University of Tromsø; 1972–1973	Succeeded by Olav Holt
