= Army Medical Service =

Army Medical Service may refer to

- Army Medical Service (Germany), a medical branch of the military of Germany
- Army Medical Services, a medical branch of the military of the United Kingdom
- Army Medical Department (United States), formerly called the Army Medical Service
- Army Medical Service (Norway), a former medical branch of the military of Norway
