= Peter Holst =

Peter Holst may refer to:

- Peter Fredrik Holst (1861–1935), Norwegian physician
- Peter Theodor Holst (1843–1908), Norwegian politician

== See also ==
- Per Holst (1939–2025), Danish film producer and director
