= Finn Moestue Husebye =

Norwegian priest (1905–2001)

- Born: 11 May 1905
- Died: 2001 (aged 95–96)
- Occupation: Priest
- Awards: Order of St. Olav (1945)

Finn Moestue Huseby (11 May 1905 – 2001) was a Norwegian priest. He graduated as a Candidate of Theology in 1930. He worked as seamen's priest in New Orleans from 1931 to 1934, in Antwerp from 1935 to 1936, and in Hamburg from 1936 to 1942. He had to leave Germany because of a conflict with Nazi-friendly Norwegians in Germany, and assistant priest Arne Berge took over after him as the seamen's priest in Hamburg. He was parish priest in Brandbu from 1946.

Huseby was decorated Knight First Class of the Royal Norwegian Order of St. Olav in 1945, for his work for prisoners in Germany during the Second World War.
