= King Christian X's Liberty Medal =

King Christian X's Liberty Medal Kong Christian den Tiendes frihedsmedaille
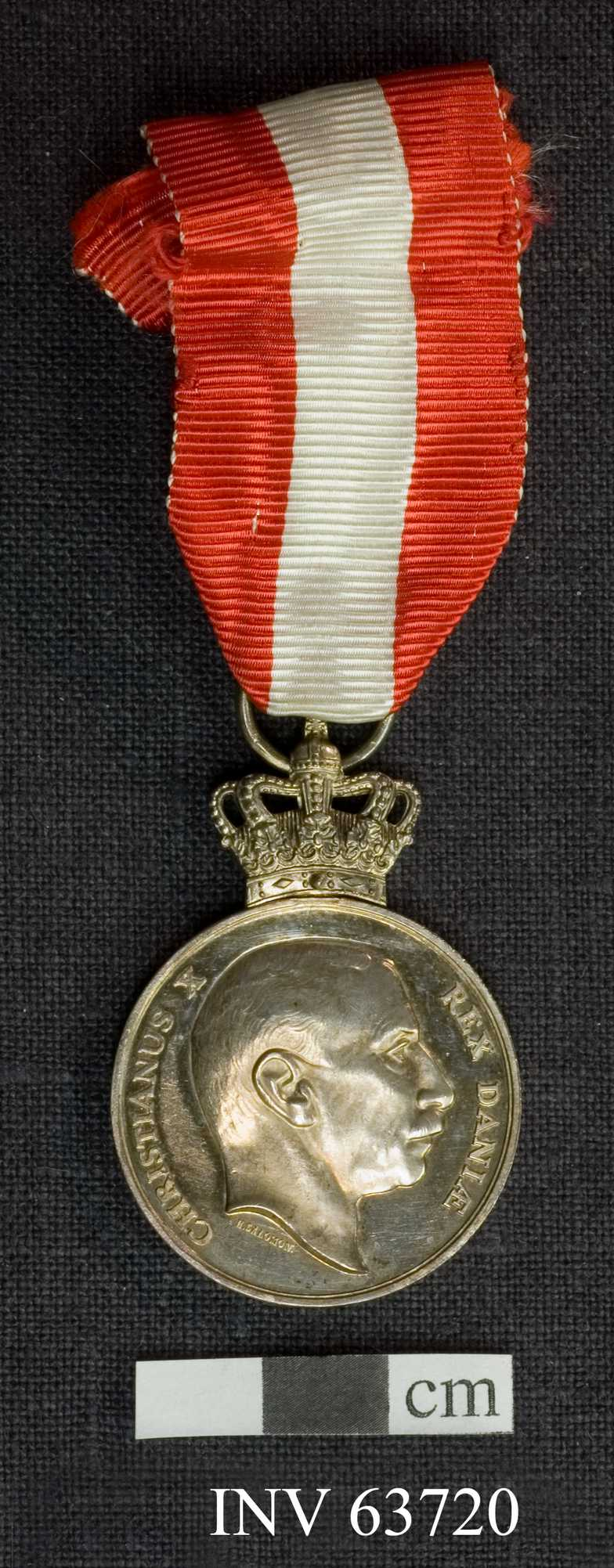
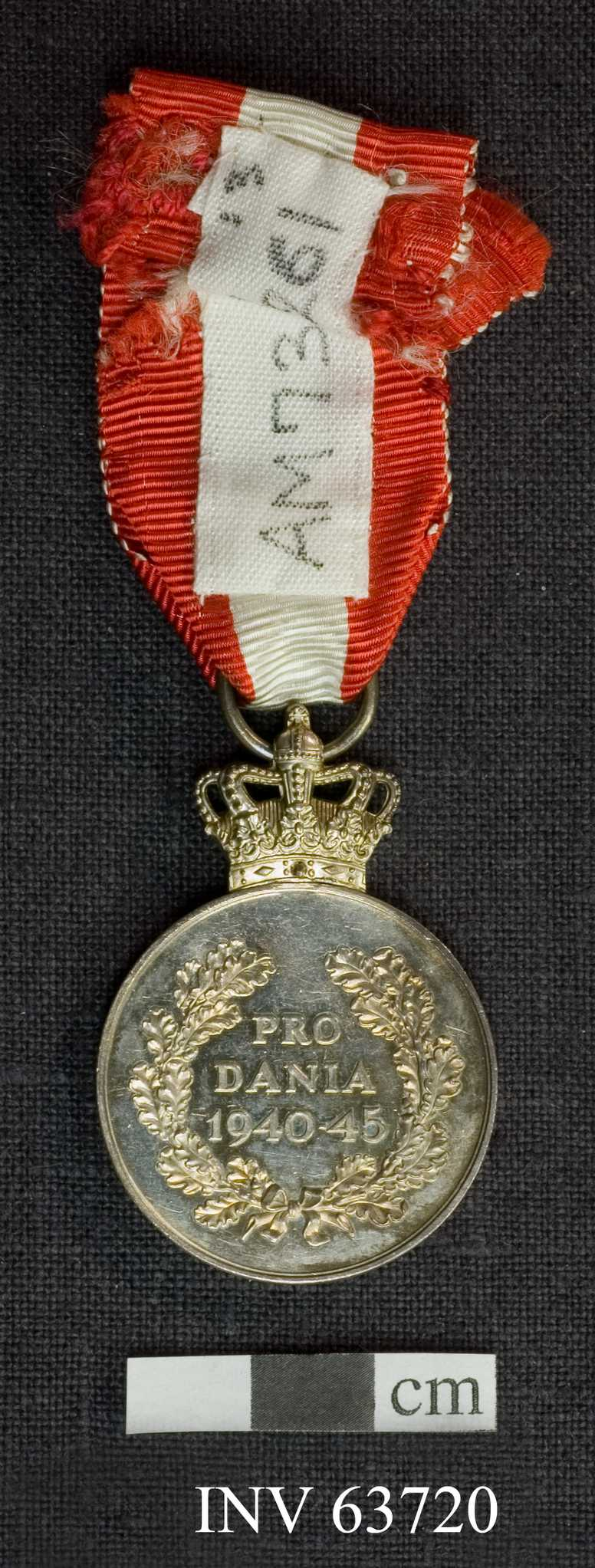
- Obverse and reverse of the medal
- Awarded for: Special contributions to the struggle for a free Denmark.
- Country: Denmark
- Presented by: King Christian X
- Eligibility: Foreigners and Danes living abroad
- Post-nominals: Chr.X.Fr.M.
- Established: 5 May 1946

Highlights
- Total: Approximately 3000
- Ribbon bar of the medal

King Christian X's Liberty Medal (Danish: Kong Christian den Tiendes frihedsmedaille) was a commemorative decoration awarded by King Christian X for special services to Denmark during World War II.

== Appearance ==
The medal is circular and made of silver. It is suspended by an integral crown suspension. The obverse bears the effigy in profile of King Christian X, facing right. Inscribed around the edge is CHRISTIANUS X REX DANIÆ (Christian X King of the Danes). The reverse is inscribed with PRO DANIA (for Denmark) and dated 1940-1945 surrounded by a wreath of oak leaves.

== Recipients ==
- Rolf Andvord
- Bernt Balchen
- Arne Berge
- Winston Churchill
- Alma Dahlerup
- Nils-Eric Ekblad
- Haakon VII of Norway
- Francis Hackett
- Olav V of Norway
- Marie Ahnighito Peary
- George Petersen
- Jan Smuts
- Nils Swedlund
- Ian Fleming
- Konstantin Rokossovsky
