= Wanda Hjort Heger =

Norwegian resistance member (1921–2017)

Wanda Maria Heger
- Born: Wanda Maria von der Marwitz Hjort; 9 March 1921; Kristiania, Norway
- Died: 27 January 2017 (aged 95); Oslo, Norway
- Education: Social work
- Known for: Helping Norwegian and other Scandinavian prisoners in concentration camps during World War II
- Spouse: Bjørn Heger (1914–1985)
- Children: Anders Heger
- Parent: Johan Bernhard Hjort
- Relatives: Johan Hjort (grandfather); Peter Fredrik Holst (grandfather); Peter F. Hjort (brother)

Wanda Maria Heger (née Wanda Maria von der Marwitz Hjort; 9 March 1921 – 27 January 2017) was a Norwegian social worker noted for her efforts to help Norwegian and other prisoners in Nazi concentration camps during World War II.

== Background ==
Wanda Hjort was the oldest of Johan Bernhard Hjort's six children. J. B. Hjort was a noted lawyer who co-founded the Norwegian fascist party Nasjonal Samling with Vidkun Quisling in 1933. Hjort, however, broke with Nasjonal Samling in 1937 and became part of the Norwegian resistance movement upon the German invasion in 1940 and occupation between 1940 and 1945. She was arrested at the personal order of Josef Terboven and detained in Norway at Møllergata 19 and Grini and then sent to a prison in Berlin. Thanks to intervention by German relatives, Hjort was confined to house arrest at a family estate near Brandenburg called Groß Kreutz on the condition that his entire family join him there.

While in Oslo, Wanda had assisted her father's law practice on behalf of prisoners held by Nazi authorities, and had also taken part in smuggling documents and supplies in and out of prisons there, especially Møllergata 19 and Grini.

== Activities in Germany ==
Wanda reluctantly arrived in Germany where she, through contacts in the Norwegian seaman's church in Hamburg and the Danish church in Berlin, learned about a growing population of Norwegian prisoners in Sachsenhausen. She and her siblings packed backpacks with some food supplies and travelled by public transportation to the camp gate, telling the camp guards they had packages for the Norwegian prisoners. Among these supplies were two glass jars of potato salad. Since glass jars were in scarce supply, they said they would be back to pick up the empty jars in a week. This started a weekly routine that led to familiarity with the camp guards. Over time Wanda was able to gain access to the package sorting facility (Paketstelle) within the first perimeter of the camp, where she was able to pass messages with Norwegian prisoners who worked there, among them Kristian Ottosen.

These messages, sometimes written on small notes, other times passed orally, enabled the Hjort family (who by then was joined at Gross Kreutz by the family of former Sachsenhausen prisoner and the rector of the University of Oslo, Didrik Arup Seip) to compile complete and accurate lists of Norwegians held in captivity in Germany, including the all-important prisoner numbers. These lists were sent to the Norwegian government-in-exile in London and were also essential for the success of the Swedish Red Cross and Danish Red Cross White Buses operation, in which she and other family members took an active part. It is estimated that the White Buses operation saved 15,345 prisoners from mortal danger in concentration and prisoner camps; of these 7,795 were Scandinavian and 7,550 were non-Scandinavian. In particular, 423 Danish Jews were saved from the Theresienstadt concentration camp inside German-occupied territory of Czechoslovakia, contributing significantly to the fact that the casualties among Danish Jews during the Holocaust were among the lowest of the occupied countries of Europe.

During her weekly visits to Sachsenhausen she learned that some of the Norwegian prisoners had been transported to the Natzweiler as Nacht und Nebel prisoners. Under the pretext of visiting Norwegian students in Sennheim she obtained a travel visa to the Alsace region. Aided in part by a letter she had received from Heinrich Himmler through his brother Ernst Himmler in response to her complaint about having to go to Germany, she came close enough to the camp to confirm its existence and that Norwegian prisoners were held there.

Her book Hver fredag foran porten (Gyldendal, 1984, later editions 1995 and 2005) about the war years won the prize for being the best documentary book in 1984, and has been translated into German (Jeden Freitag vor dem Tor, Schneekluth, 1989) and French (Tous les vendredis devant le portail, Gaia, 2009).

== Post-war years ==
Immediately after the war ended in 1945, she married Bjørn Heger, a Norwegian medical student released from a prison in Berlin, at the seaman's church in Hamburg. She earned a degree in social work and pursued a career helping female inmates in Norwegian prisons. For several years she also led the organisation Kriminalomsorg i frihet (outside-prison organised care for individuals sentenced for crimes). In 1985, both Wanda and Bjørn Heger were awarded the Order of St. Olav for their humanitarian war-time efforts.

In her later years, she continued to be active in education about the war years, serving on the board of the White Buses Foundation. She had six children; among them is Anders Heger. She died on 27 January 2017.
