= Agnar Mykle =

Norwegian writer and puppeteer (1915–1994)

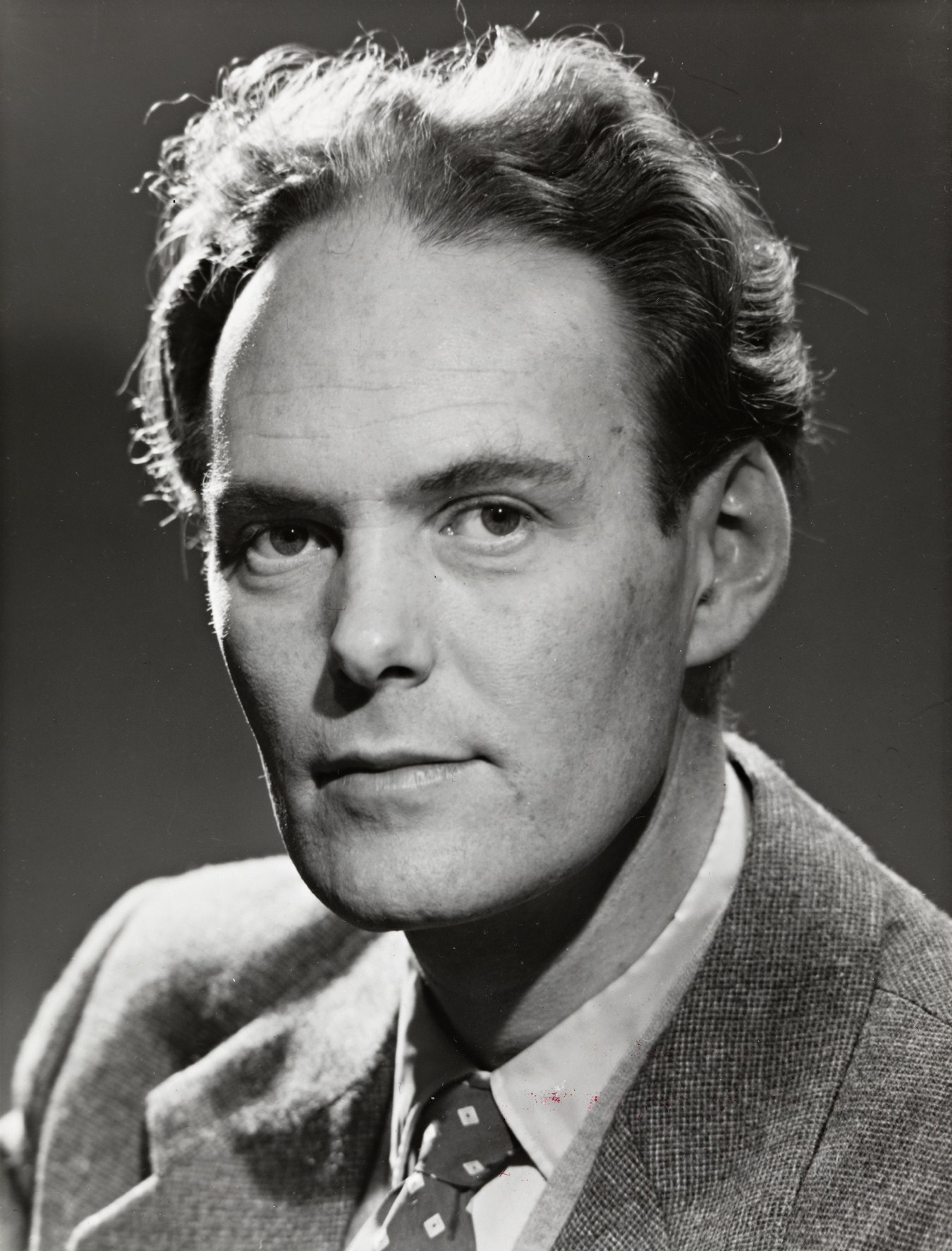
- Mykle in 1956
- Born: Agnar Myklebust; 8 August 1915; Trondheim, Norway
- Died: 15 January 1994 (aged 78)
- Occupations: Author; Journalist
- Writing career
- Language: Norwegian
- Genres: Novels & non-fiction

Agnar Mykle (8 August 1915 – 15 January 1994) was a Norwegian author. He became one of the most controversial figures in Norwegian literature in the 20th century.

== Early life ==
Born in Norway's third largest city, Trondheim, Mykle was often sick as a child. His sickness forced him to stay indoors for most of his childhood. Mykle received a business education from the Norwegian School of Economics (NHH) in Bergen where he excelled in his studies. He had attended mercantile high school in Trondheim (Handelsgymnasiet) from which he graduated in 1935. Soon after, he was offered a job as an assistant at his old school. After working diligently, he was offered a job as a principal at a similar school in Kirkenes.

== Literary career ==
In the 1940s Mykle was active as journalist and writer in the Norwegian labour movement. He wrote scripts for their election campaign films and plays for amateur theatre groups associated with the labour movement. Mykle debuted as an author in 1948 with Taustigen, a collection of short stories. Other short story collections included Jeg er like glad, sa gutten (1952), Kors på halsen (1958) and Largo (1967). His novel Tyven, tyven skal du hete (published in English as The Hotel Room) was written in (1951). His two subsequent novels, Lasso rundt fru Luna (published in English as Lasso Around The Moon) (1954) and Sangen om den røde rubin (The Song of the Red Ruby) (1956) have strong autobiographical tendencies. His last published novel was Rubicon (1965), originally thought of as a sequel to the previous two, finishing the tale about Ash Burlefoot.

Three collections of his non-fiction writing were published post-humously in 1997 and 1998, Mannen fra Atlantis, En flodhest på parnasset and Alter og disk.

=== Red Ruby controversy ===
The publication of The Song of the Red Ruby in 1957 ignited what became one of the most famous court cases in Norwegian history. Mykle and his publisher Harald Grieg were accused of writing and publishing immoral and obscene material. Mykle's defense attorney was Johan Bernhard Hjort. Mykle and Grieg were both acquitted, but the remaining copies of the book were ordered withdrawn from the market. The Norwegian Supreme Court overturned the ruling on the confiscation in 1958. The court case and the pressure caused by the media attention changed Mykle for the rest of his life, and he became a recluse. No photographs were published of him after 1957 and he chose to associate almost exclusively with friends and family. In the autumn of 1993, however, Mykle had a series of conversations with Nils Kåre Jacobsen, an employee at Mykle's publishing house, Gyldendal. These talks were later turned into the book Mine bøker er musikk: møter med Agnar Mykle ( - My books are music: meetings with Agnar Mykle)

=== Financial difficulties ===
The translations of The Song of the Red Ruby gathered tremendous attention outside of Norway, especially in the United States. Huge sales followed, but Mykle nevertheless had financial difficulties for the rest of his life. His letter exchanges with the Norwegian inland revenue were published in the Norwegian newspaper Dagbladet, and they were as eloquently written as most of his literature output.

== Other interests ==
=== Puppet theatre activity ===
His passions included the puppet theatre, both as a director and puppeteer, and with his wife Jane he published a book about puppet theatre, Dukketeater, considered the most important book written about the subject in Norway.

=== Musical interests ===
Mykle also had an avid interest in music all his life. His father played in a marching band in Trondheim, and Mykle was particularly taken with marches and other band music. His favourite composer of marches was Kenneth Alford.

== Derived works ==
In 1970, Annelise Meineche directed a film entitled Sangen om den Røde Rubin, but the plot greatly compresses (with significant alterations) both Lasso rundt Fru Luna and Sangen om den Røde Rubin. The film did not meet with Mykle's approval.

== Impact of his work on Norwegian society ==
In 1994 the pop band Tre Små Kinesere from Trondheim released what became an instant hit single, a tribute to Agnar Mykle titled "Agnar Mykle".

Almost ten books have been published in Norway about Mykle and his authorship.

== Sources ==
- Eystein Eggen: Agnar Mykle – en dikterskjebne (1994)
- Anders Heger: Mykle, et diktet liv (1999)
