= White Buses =

1945 rescue operation of concentration camp inmates

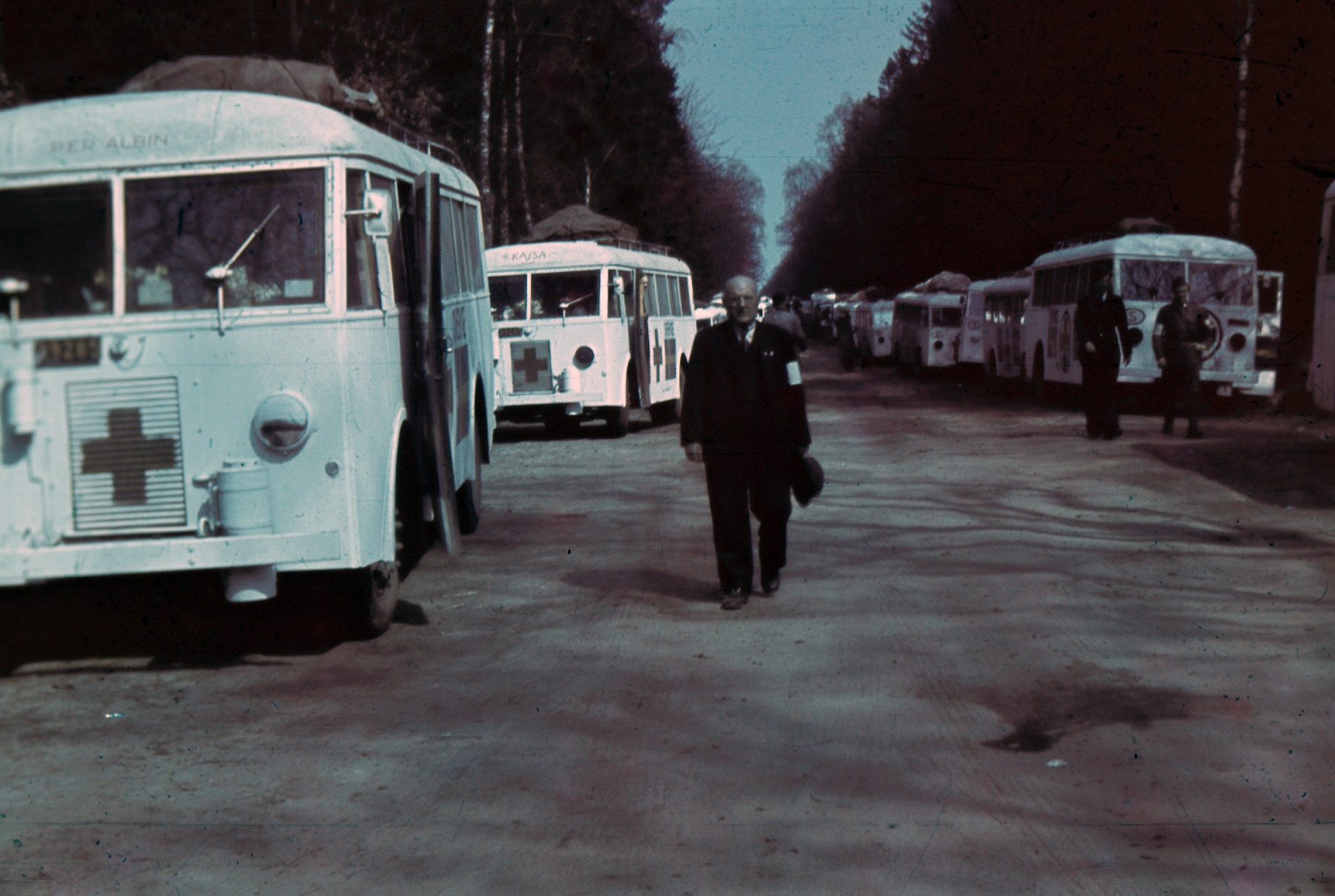
Swedish white buses gathered in their field headquarters at Friedrichsruh

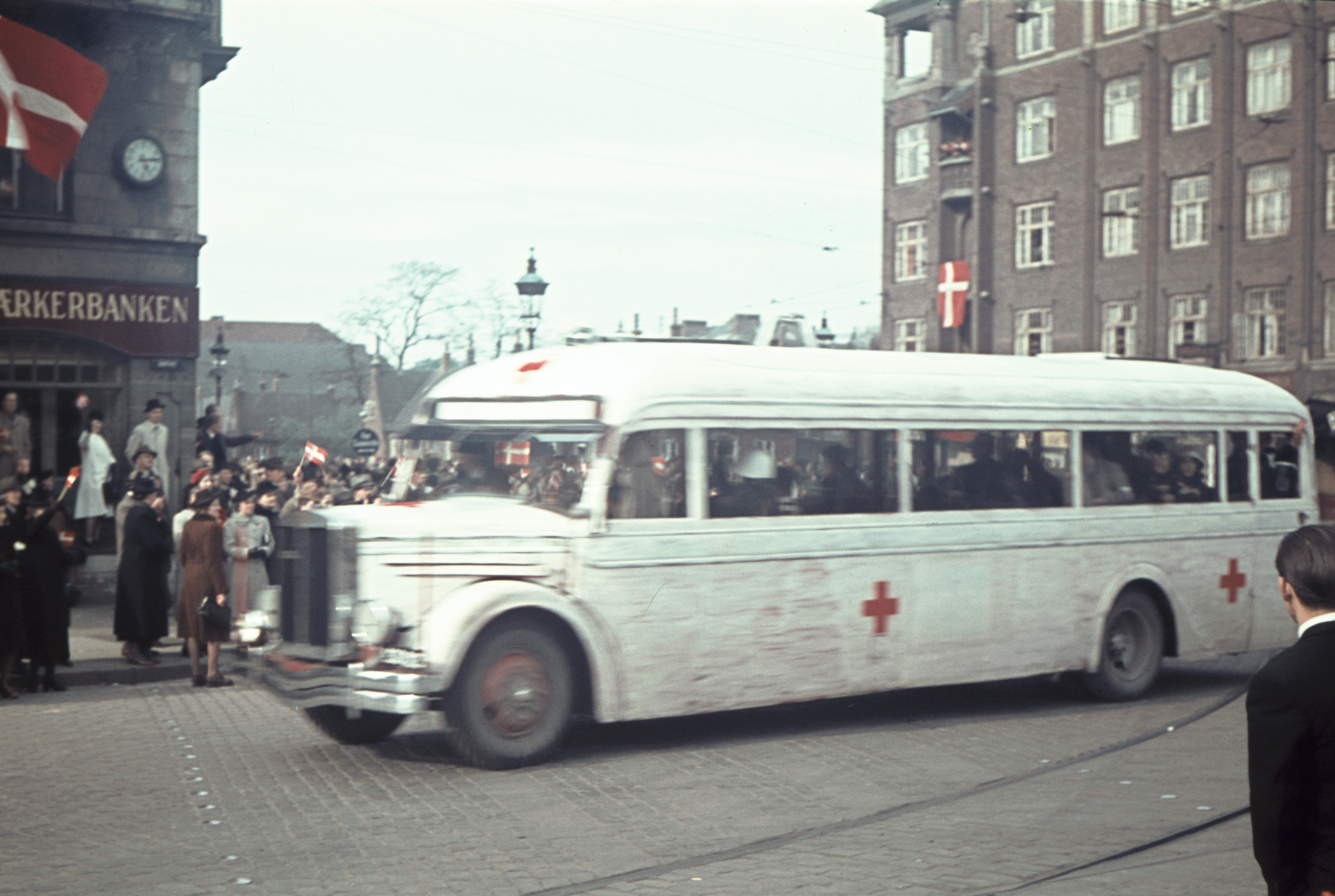
Danish Red Cross buses in Copenhagen

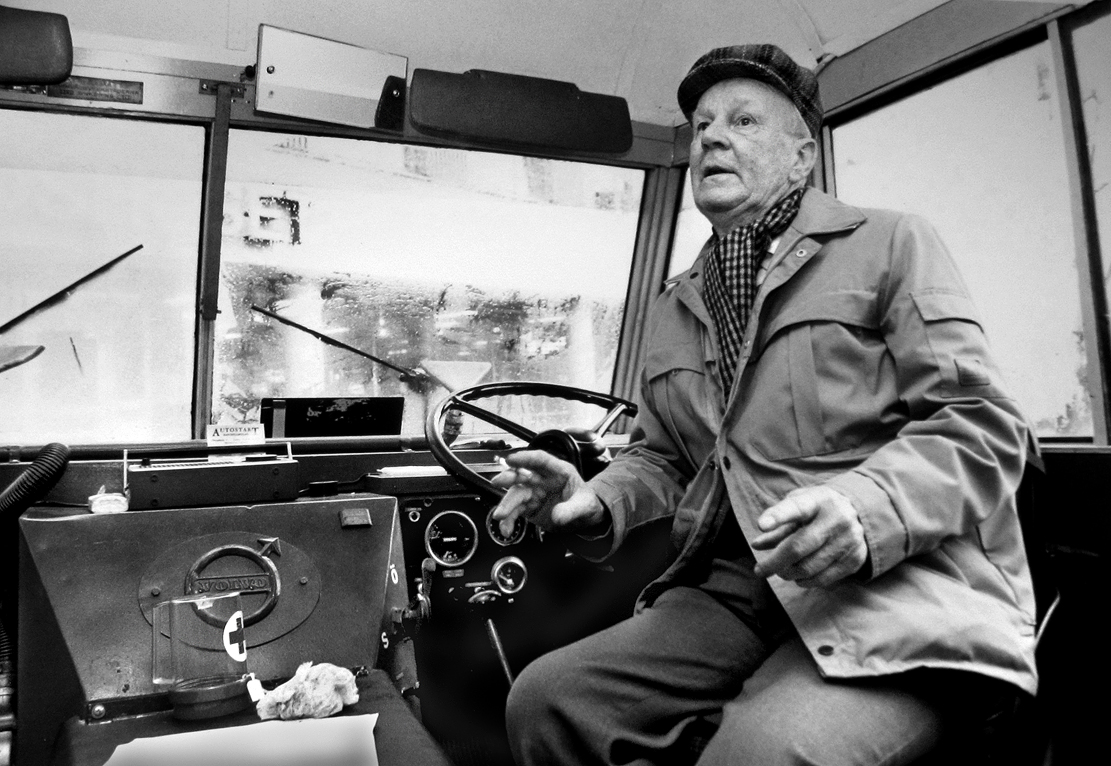
On 19 April 1945, the White Buses started driving prisoners from concentration camps in Germany. As a young citizen, Stig Svensson was a volunteer driver on one of the white Red Cross buses (not the one in the picture). "I'll never forget what I've seen", he said in a 1992 interview.

White Buses (Swedish: Vita bussarna) was a Swedish humanitarian operation with the objective of freeing Scandinavians in German concentration camps in Nazi Germany during the final stages of World War II. Although the White Buses operation was envisioned to rescue Scandinavians, one-half of those taken from the camps to Sweden were of other nationalities. The buses used to transport the prisoners were painted white with red crosses painted on the roof, side, front and back, so that the buses would not be mistaken for military targets by Allied air forces. Those allowed by the Germans to be freed from the concentration camps were transported by the white buses and trucks to the port city of Lübeck, Germany. Swedish ships took them onward to Malmö, Sweden. Danes continued on by land on the white buses to Denmark.

Swedish diplomat Folke Bernadotte and others negotiated the White Buses operation with German officials, especially Reichsführer Heinrich Himmler. Although estimates of those rescued vary, the Swedish Red Cross estimated that about 300 Swedish volunteers, mostly military personnel, removed 15,345 prisoners from concentration camps in March and April 1945. 7,795 were Norwegian and Danish prisoners and 7,550 were other nationalities. After the German capitulation on 8 May 1945, another 10,000 people were rescued in May and June 1945 by "White Boats."

The operation was a humanitarian success and saved the lives of many who would have died of deprivation or execution in the concentration camps. The number of Jews among those rescued cannot be determined as the former prisoners were registered by nationality and not ethnic group or religion. Some criticims have been directed at the operation for being too one-sided a rescue operation for Scandinavians, and for cooperating with the German Gestapo in negotiating the release and safe transport of prisoners.

== Danish and Norwegian prisoners in Germany ==
Denmark and Norway were invaded by Germany on 9 April 1940. A number of Norwegians were immediately arrested, and two months later the occupying force established the first prisoners' camp at Ulven outside Bergen. As tensions intensified between the Nazi authorities and the resistance, increasing numbers of Norwegians were arrested and detained in Norwegian prisons and camps; and later deported to camps in Germany. The first groups of Norwegian prisoners arrived in Sachsenhausen camp in early 1940.

Arrests in Denmark began with the resignation of the coalition government in the summer of 1943.

The Norwegian and Danish prisoners in Germany were divided into various categories, from the so-called civil interned who lived privately and had certain freedoms, to the Nacht und Nebel (NN) or "Night and Fog" prisoners who were made to disappear without a trace. As the number of Scandinavian prisoners increased, various groups organised relief work for them. The Norwegian seamen's priests in Hamburg, Arne Berge and Conrad Vogt-Svendsen, visited prisoners, brought them food and brought letters to their families in Norway and Denmark. Vogt-Svendsen also made contact with the civilians interned at Gross Kreutz, the Norwegian families Hjort and Seip. Together with other Scandinavians, the group at Gross Kreutz compiled extensive lists of prisoners and their location. The lists were then sent to the Norwegian government-in-exile in London through the Swedish embassy in Berlin. In Stockholm the Norwegian diplomat Niels Christian Ditleff engaged himself heavily with the fate of the Scandinavian prisoners. By the end of 1944, there were around 8,000 Norwegian prisoners in Germany, in addition to around 1,125 Norwegian prisoners of war.

On the Danish side, Admiral Carl Hammerich had long worked with secret plans for an expedition code-named the Jyllandskorps to save Danish and Norwegian prisoners from the German camps. Hammerich had good connections with the Norwegian seaman's priests, the Gross Kreutz group and with Niels Christian Ditleff in Stockholm. By the beginning of 1945 there were around 6,000 Danish prisoners in Germany. During 1944, the Danes made extensive planning efforts, including the registration of prisoners and plans for transporting resources and making available food, shelter and quarantine for the prisoners, if they succeeded in reaching Denmark. Hammerich visited Stockholm in February, April and July 1944, and discussed the plans with Ditleff.

== Preliminary considerations ==
As the Allied forces approached Germany at the end of 1944, SHAEF decided what to do with Allied prisoners. Within the Norwegian government, Major Johan Koren Christie wrote a memorandum on 23 September; the Norwegian prisoners should "stay put", and wait until they were liberated by the advancing Allied forces. The Gross Kreutz group learned of this policy a month later and reacted swiftly, with Johan Bernhard Hjort writing a report advising against the proposal. His arguments were that the prisoners risked being murdered and that they had to be rescued before Germany was occupied.

He wrote:

It is therefore strongly suggested that the Norwegian government considers the possibility that the Swedish government could be induced to intervene to help at least the Norwegian and Danish civil prisoners in Germany, including those in prisons, with the aim of transporting them to Sweden, where they if feasible may stay until the war has ended.

This October 1944 report from Hjort was the first time a Swedish operation for the Scandinavian prisoners is mentioned. At first the proposal was unfavourably received. Rescue of the prisoners was seen as a Norwegian responsibility and the Norwegian government was reluctant to give the Swedes any chance to distinguish themselves at the end of the war.

Norwegian diplomat Niels Christian Ditleff in Stockholm refused to accept the guidelines from the Norwegian government and continued to implore both Swedes and the Swedish foreign department for Sweden to rescue Scandinavian prisoners. In September 1944, Ditleff raised the question with Count Folke Bernadotte of the Swedish Red Cross, who immediately supported the plan. On 30 November, Ditleff delivered his memorandum "Reasons for a Swedish operation for rescuing prisoners" to the Swedish foreign office, but still on his own initiative. On 29 December, the Norwegian government changed its position and instructed its embassy in Stockholm to discuss the possibility of a Swedish operation aimed at rescuing Scandinavian prisoners.

While Ditleff tried to influence the exiled Norwegian government, the Danes obtained a German permit to retrieve prisoners. The first ones transported back to Denmark were Danish policemen from Buchenwald, with the first transport started on 5 December. By the end of February 1945, the Danes had transported 341 prisoners home, most of them ill. These journeys gave the Danes valuable experience that later benefitted the "White Buses".

== Negotiations with Germany ==
Felix Kersten, the personal physical-therapist of Nazi Germany's Reichsführer Heinrich Himmler, set the table for the release of internees in German concentration camps. Kersten, resident in Sweden, had previously negotiated with Himmler for the release of several internees in concentration camps and had discussed the ways and means of ensuring the safety of Danish and Norwegians internees with both Norwegian diplomat Ditleff and Himmler.

On 5 February 1945, Ditleff proposed officially that Sweden undertake a rescue mission for people interned in German concentration camps and send a delegation to Germany to negotiate the rescue mission. The Swedish Foreign Ministry approved the plan on 10 February, designating diplomat Folke Bernadotte to initiate talks with Nazi Germany to "attempt to obtain the release of Norwegian and Danish internees in Germany and their transportation to Sweden or Denmark." As Germany faced imminent defeat by the Allied forces, the Swedes feared that the Germans might liquidate all prisoners in their concentration camps. From 17 to 21 February, Bernadotte met with senior Nazi officials including Himmler. Bernadotte alluded to the possibility that neutral Sweden might not remain neutral, implying that Sweden might enter the war on the Allied side if relations between the two countries did not improve. That argument had weight, as Sweden was the major supplier of iron ore to Germany. With defeat nearly certain for Germany, Himmler was attempting to ingratiate himself with the Allies and neutral states such as Sweden. Himmler and other German officials agreed in principle to the rescue operation which foresaw that all Norwegian and Danish prisoners of the Germans would be gathered together in one camp for their safety and meeting their humanitarian needs. Himmler estimated the Danish and Norwegian prisoners numbered 2,000 to 3,000; Bernadotte had evidence they numbered 13,000. The Germans said that all resources for the operation must come from Sweden and the Swedish Red Cross. Himmler also demanded that there be no publicity about the operation as Adolf Hitler was opposed to prisoner releases.

Parallel with Bernadotte's attempts, Danish authorities – especially the Danish ambassador in Berlin, Otto Carl Mohr – tried to secure the release of more Danish prisoners. Swedish and Danish aims differed slightly. The Swedes negotiated with Himmler and Schellenberg and concentrated on gathering the prisoners in Neuengamme. The Danes negotiated with Kaltenbrunner and tried to secure permission to have the prisoners released, or possibly interned in Denmark. On 12 March the Danes obtained permission for three transports and until 21 March a total of 262 Danish prisoners of various categories were moved back to Denmark using Danish vehicles. From 21 March there was a break in Danish transports and the Swedes took over.

== Swedish aid ==
Sweden was the only Nordic country that remained neutral during the Second World War.

Kersten also acted as an intermediary between the Swedish foreign department and Himmler. Walter Schellenberg, a trusted subordinate of Himmler, had long held the view that Germany would lose the war and encouraged Himmler to explore the possibility of a separate peace treaty with the Western powers; in this Sweden could be a useful intermediary. With Kersten's assistance the Swedish foreign department was able to free 50 Norwegian students, 50 Danish policemen and 3 Swedes in December 1944. An absolute condition for the release of the prisoners was that it should be hidden from the press; if Hitler got to know about it further repatriations would be impossible.

Ditleff sent a new memorandum on 5 February 1945, this time as an official Norwegian request. Sweden was solicited for sending a Red Cross delegation to Berlin to negotiate the position of the Scandinavian prisoners, and if successful to send a Swedish relief expedition. The Swedish foreign minister Christian Günther was in favour and the Swedish government gave permission for Bernadotte, second in command of the Swedish Red Cross:

to attempt to obtain permission in Germany for the transport to Sweden or Denmark of the interned Norwegian and Danish prisoners.

Bernadotte flew to Berlin on 16 February and met several Nazi leaders such as the foreign minister Joachim von Ribbentrop, Ernst Kaltenbrunner, head of the RSHA (Reich Main Security Office), Himmler and Schellenberg. Himmler, who was one of the most powerful people in Nazi Germany, was initially negative to the transportation of prisoners to neutral Sweden. The prisoners could be trained as police troops, as Sweden already did with other Norwegians and Danes. Bernadotte had to fall back on his secondary proposal – that the prisoners should be assembled in one camp so the Swedish Red Cross could support them. Bernadotte told Himmler he estimated the number of Scandinavian prisoners to be around 13,000 while Himmler held it could not be more than two or three thousand.

During a second meeting with Schellenberg on 21 February, Bernadotte got word from Himmler that he had accepted the proposal to assemble the Scandinavian prisoners in one camp. During the visit to Berlin Bernadotte also had several meetings with the Gross Kreutz group, Didrik Arup Seip, Conrad Vogt-Svendsen, Wanda Hjort and Bjørn Heger. Bernadotte's secondary proposal to Himmler, which he accepted, was prepared by Heger.

== Establishing the expedition ==
The foundation of the White Buses expedition was several years of planning and information collection by Danes and Norwegians. This was used by the Swedes without many alterations. The Swedish Red Cross contacted the Swedish Army who supplied the needed transport. In reality, this was the Swedish state's expedition – the personnel were almost entirely volunteers from the armed forces, the equipment was supplied from armed forces stockpiles and the expenses were covered by the state's coffers.

=== Composition of the expedition force ===
- 308 personnel, among them about 20 doctors and nurses, the rest were volunteers from the supply regiments T 1, T 3 and T 4; they were commanded by Colonel Gottfrid Björck as he was the inspector general for the Swedish Army Service Troops
- 36 ambulance buses
- 19 trucks
- 7 passenger cars
- 7 motorcycles
- rescue and workshop trucks and a field kitchen
- all necessary equipment, including food, fuel and spare parts, as nothing could be had once in Germany
- The vessels Lillie Matthiessen sailing to Lübeck with 350 tons of fuel and 6,000 food parcels for the prisoners, later the Magdalena, both from the Salén shipping line

The force was divided into three bus platoons (each with 12 buses), one truck platoon (with 12 vehicles), and one supply platoon. Total transport capacity for the force was 1,000 personnel for longer distances or 1,200 personnel for shorter distances where the trucks could also be used. The buses used Motyl (a mixture of 50% gasoline and 50% ethanol) and had eight stretchers or seats for 30 passengers. They used 0.5 litres of fuel per kilometre (5.6 imperial mpg); with full tanks they could cover 100 kilometres (62 mi). Each bus carried two drivers.

To avoid publicity in the newspapers the Swedish state information bureau distributed so-called "grey notices" where the editors were instructed to avoid stories about the expedition.

The Danish ambassador in Stockholm had offered a larger force (40 buses, 30 trucks, 18 ambulances and other vehicles). Bernadotte had considered a mixed Swedish-Danish expedition, this offer was turned down on 23 February, due to the German requirement that the expedition force had to be Swedish.

== Departure ==
The first section of the expedition departed Hässleholm on 8 March and boarded the ferry from Malmö to Copenhagen. The Danish resistance movement was informed and supported the idea of the expedition. On 12 March, the first part of the expedition had reached its headquarters, Friedrichsruh castle, situated 30 km southeast of Hamburg. The castle was near the Neuengamme concentration camp, where the Scandinavian prisoners were to be assembled. Friedrichsruh castle was owned by Otto von Bismarck, a friend of Bernadotte and married to a Swede. The expedition staff were lodged in the castle and a nearby pub, while the men established a tented camp in the park surrounding the castle.

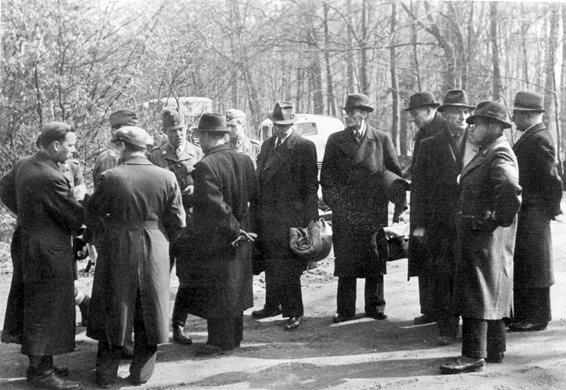
Gestapo officers escorting the "white buses"

The expedition had German liaison officers; the most prominent of them being Himmler's communications officer, SS-Obersturmbannführer Karl Rennau, while Franz Göring was a liaison officer with the Gestapo. The expedition had around 40 German communication, SS and Gestapo officers. The Germans demanded that every second vehicle should have a German officer on board. The "White Buses" expedition was totally dependent on cooperation with the Germans as the country under Nazi rule was a police state. Only with liaison personnel from the Gestapo and SS could the expedition move without restrictions.

Bernadotte had promised Schellenberg to have the expedition in Warnemünde on 3 March, but it was delayed by more than a week. The main reason for this was the difficulty in obtaining guarantees from the Allied forces to ensure that the expedition would not be attacked. At this stage in the war, the Allies had total air superiority and regularly attacked transport on German roads. The "White Buses" expedition would move mainly within areas controlled by the Royal Air Force. On 8 March, the British government informed the Swedish foreign department that it was informed about the expedition but that it could not give any guarantees against attacks, and that the Swedish expedition was on its own within Germany. Some of the vehicles were hit by Allied aircraft strafing the roads, killing one Swedish driver and 25 concentration camp prisoners.

== Transports begin ==
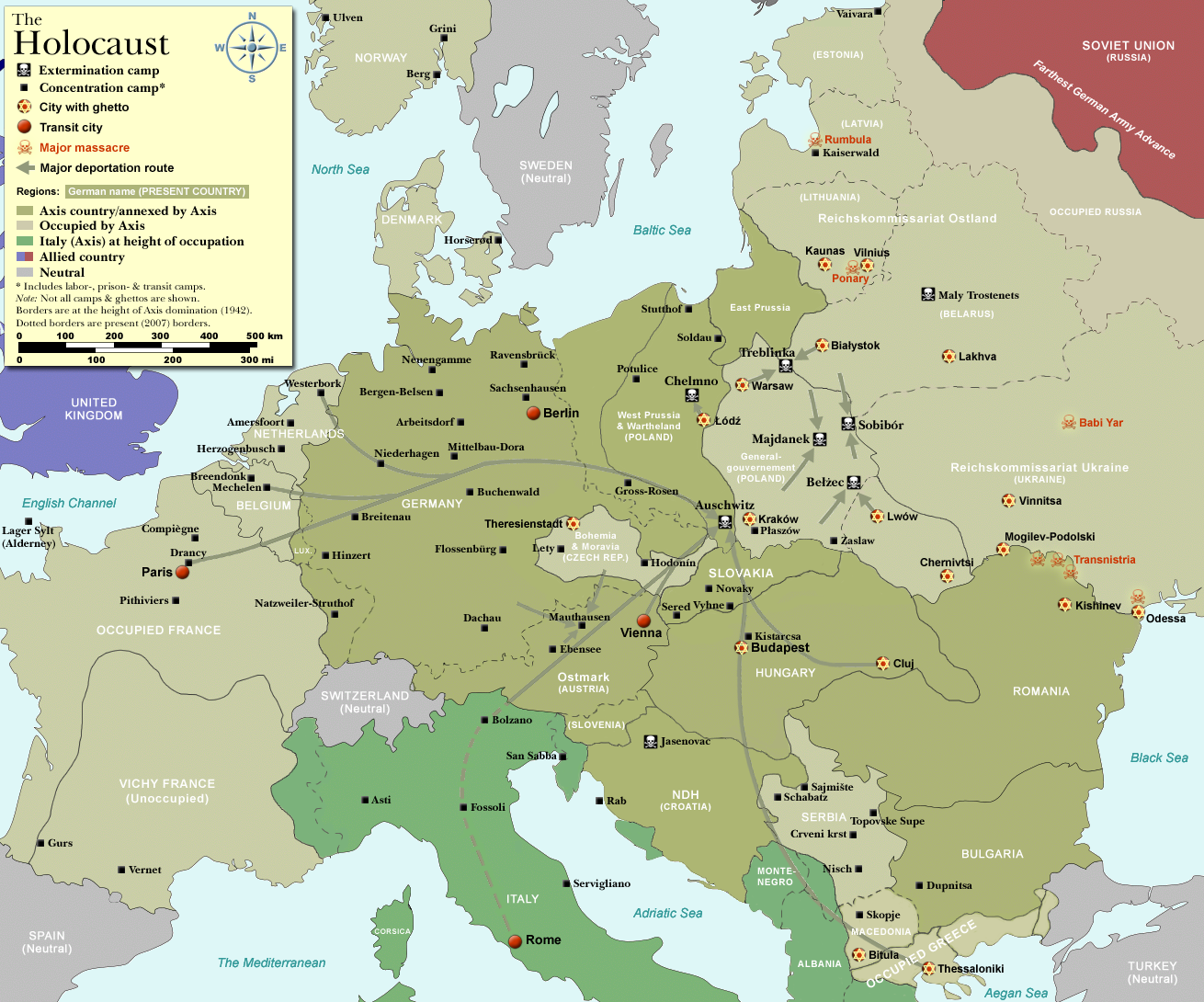
Map of German concentration camps

The mission became known for its buses, which, with the exception of the Red Cross emblem on their sides, were painted entirely white so that they would not be mistaken for military vehicles. In total it included 308 personnel (about 20 medics and the rest volunteer soldiers), 36 hospital buses, 19 trucks, seven passenger cars, seven motorcycles, a tow truck, a field kitchen, and full supplies for the entire trip, including food and gasoline, none of which was permitted to be obtained in Germany. A count of 21,000 people rescued included 8,000 Danes and Norwegians, 5,911 Poles, 2,629 French, 1,615 Jews, and 1,124 Germans. The expedition in Friedrichsruh was divided into two groups, the first being assigned the responsibility of transporting prisoners from Sachsenhausen, north of Berlin, to Neuengamme. The evacuations started on 15 March, over a distance of around 540 kilometres. During seven missions, around 2,200 Danes and Norwegians were transferred to Neuengamme.

Sven Frykman, who commanded one of the columns, wrote about the prisoners and the drive:

In general they were in relative good shape compared to other prisoners I have seen and one could not complain regarding their personal hygiene. They related that the food packs they had received from Norway and Denmark had kept their spirits up and recently the treatment had been noticeably better. They were all touching [sic] thankful and happy. I believe that all of us that have had the option of helping these poor people in Germany have experienced such an overwhelming gratitude that it is enough for the rest of our lives.

As the prisoners were being picked up in Sachsenhausen, their names were checked with the group from Gross Kreutz, to make sure no one was left behind.

The other group was responsible for collecting prisoners from southern Germany. This included Dachau to the north of Munich, Schönberg (some 80 kilometres south of Stuttgart) and Mauthausen (12 kilometres/7.5 miles east of Linz). The distances for this mission were greater, as Munich alone was 800 kilometres (500 mi) away. Adding to the difficulties was the delay that the transports faced due to a lack of fuel. The first column started out on 19 March, including 35 vehicles under Colonel Björck, which returned to Neuengamme on 24 March. The journey back was difficult as most of the prisoners were in poor physical condition, as Swedish nurse Margaretha Björcke documented:

I have never in my twelve years practice as a nurse seen so much misery as I here witnessed. Legs, backs and necks full of wounds of a type that an average Swede would be on sick leave for just one of them. I counted twenty on one prisoner, and he did not complain.

This first transport collected 550 prisoners while 67 very sick prisoners were left behind. A huge problem during the transports was the prisoners' chronic diarrhoea. This situation was subsequently remedied by the Danes supplying portable toilets of a type that had been used during their transports.

Due to the Swedish transports Neuengamme received ever more prisoners, and the concentration of Scandinavian prisoners that Himmler had promised did not materialize. Swedish health personnel and the buses were not allowed to enter the camp as the Germans would not let the Swedes see the camp. Instead the prisoners had to march to the buses.

== Swedes to Sweden ==
Early in February a small Swedish Red Cross detachment under Captain Hultgren arrived in Berlin: six men, two buses and a private car. Their mission was to transport Swedish-born women who were married to German men, and who needed to escape before the collapse of Germany, which was imminent. The evacuation started on 26 March, and 1,400 women and children of Swedish descent arrived in Malmö by 20 April, via Lübeck and Denmark.

== Assisting the SS ==
Neuengamme concentration camp was overcrowded, and to have space for the Scandinavian prisoners, the SS insisted that prisoners of other nationalities be moved to other camps. The SS commander had no transport of his own and required that the white buses accept the transports, so the newly arrived Scandinavians could solely occupy the Schonungsblock, a barrack building for prisoners not fit to work. Around 2,000 French, Belgian, Dutch, Russian and Polish prisoners were transported to other camps. Most of the transports of prisoners for the SS took place between 27 and 29 March, from Neuengamme to subcamps in Hannover and Salzgitter and to Bergen-Belsen. During the evacuations some 50 to 100 prisoners died, and many more died in the worse conditions in the new camps to which they were transported, having been moved to avoid the advancing Allied armies.

The Swedish sub-lieutenant Åke Svenson wrote:

We could now see how the Germans treated their prisoners in general, French, Belgians, Dutch, Poles, and Russians. It was terrible. This time the Germans had to allow us into the camp as most of the passengers could not walk the minor distance from the barracks to the road. From these barracks a group of creatures were forced, that hardly anymore seemed to be human beings.

The last transport for the SS was undertaken as late as 13 April, with around 450 so-called prominent French prisoners (senators, leading businessmen, etc.) who the Germans stated would be repatriated through Switzerland. According to the plan, the prisoners would be delivered to the concentration camp at Flossenburg. From there they should be transported to Switzerland by the Swiss Red Cross. The promise of the transport to Switzerland was a lie and that camp was full, so the prisoners were taken to Theresienstadt where the "white buses" were heading to pick up 400 Danish Jews.

== Gathering in Neuengamme ==
Convoys on 30 March and 2 April collected Danish police and some Norwegians, 1,200 in all, from the camps at Torgau, Mühlberg and Oschatz near Leipzig. The Danish policemen were taken to Denmark in two columns between 3 and 5 April; on 23 April around 1,000 of these were sent to Sweden.

Danish Red Cross buses, possibly near Friedrichsruh

On 29 March the Swedish Red Cross personnel were finally given access to Neuengamme as well as medicine, blankets, personal hygiene articles and food. A Scandinavian block was established and the conditions there became so good that prisoners from other nations became negative about the privileged Scandinavian prisoners.

Bernadotte arrived in Berlin from Stockholm on 28 March for renewed negotiations with Himmler. He was to gain permission to transfer the Scandinavian prisoners from Neuengamme to Sweden, have access to the whole of the camp and if possible, also take Jewish prisoners to Sweden. On 30 March Bernadotte had his first chance to visit the Neuengamme camp.

A Danish prisoner, J. B. Holmgård, wrote:

For the first time in the history of Neuengamme the Nazi butchers Pauly and Thuman were not two bragging, arrogant representatives of the master race, with swinging whips. They came pussyfoot[ing] behind Bernadotte, suddenly accommodating, helpful and amenable nearing servile wheedling, the typical wheedling so distinctive for the butchers of the master race, when it emerged for them that their days were numbered. Now we were secure of, that we would be able to return home.

By the beginning of April, most of the Scandinavian prisoners in Germany had been gathered in Neuengamme. The mission dragged out; Colonel Björck returned to Sweden and a new commander for the column was appointed, Major Sven Frykman. Some of the personnel also left, but after a promise of double daily pay, around 130 men, half of the force, stayed.

On 2 April a new Swedish column set off for the south of Germany to collect the remaining prisoners from Mauthausen and Dachau. One bus with the Norwegian doctor Bjørn Heger was assigned to search for 30 prisoners which the "Gross Kreutz" group presumed were in the area around Schömberg. The conditions were difficult, Axel Molin (one of the busdrivers) wrote:

...on our way to Schömberg the activity in the air was very high and we were overflown many times by Allied fighter planes, that did not attack us. Along the autobahn there were a lot of damaged cars and severely injured people. In some places where chaos reigned we simply could not just drive past with our white bus with Red Cross markings, but had to stop and give first aid. In some cases the damage was enormous.

In the subcamp at Vaihingen, only 16 of the 30 prisoners were found alive; the rest were dead. Among the survivors, all of whom were severely weak, were Trygve Bratteli and Kristian Ottosen. This column saved a total of 75 prisoners: 16 from Vaihingen, 16 female NN prisoners from Mauthausen and 43 seriously ill men from Dachau.

== The Danes join ==
On 5 April close to half of the Swedes returned to Sweden and they were replaced by Danes. This was accepted by the Germans and the Swedish foreign department. The Danes mustered 33 buses, 14 ambulances, seven lorries and four private cars. They were led by Frants Hvass from the Danish foreign department. The Danish contingent were coordinated with the Swedish and from 8 April the "white buses" were a mixed Swedish-Danish expedition, with the Swedes in command. The Danish vehicles were also painted white, but displayed the Danish flag, (the Dannebrog), instead of the Red Cross.

Prisoners kept in ordinary jails were a separate category, and the "white buses" were only allowed to collect these prisoners in April. On 9 April a mixed Swedish-Danish column under Captain Folke travelled to Berlin to transport 200 prisoners from various jails; knowledge of their location was the result of the work of the Reverend Vogt-Svendsen. A total of 211 prisoners were collected from some 20 establishments, among them Dresden, Cottbus, Luckau, Zeithain, Groitzsch and Waldheim (east of Dresden). On the return trip to Neuengamme on 11 April, the column witnessed for the first time a German car painted white with Red Cross markings, in a similar manner to the "white buses". On April 15 a column collected 524 prisoners from jails in Mecklenburg.

== Theresienstadt ==
The Danish Jews who had not been able to escape the arrests of 1943 had been deported to Theresienstadt, near the city of Terezín in today's Czech Republic. It required patience before the Germans gave permission to proceed, and time was short; the Allies were approaching. In the end the German liaison officer, Rennau, managed to get authorisation from the Gestapo, and on 12 April a column set out under the command of Captain Folke with 23 Swedish buses, 12 private cars, motorcycles and a number of Danish ambulances with Danish doctors and nurses.

The situation in Germany was now critical, and the Swedish drivers were informed that the trip would be very dangerous. At the last minute, the Swedish foreign department tried to stop the departure, as they had been informed that Soviet forces had blocked the road, but the column departed anyway. On 15 April the column had collected 423 Scandinavian Jews from Theresienstadt and started on the perilous return journey. On the way back the column passed Dresden, which had been bombed a month before and had an overnight stop near Potsdam, which had been bombed the same night. The transport reached Padborg on 17 April, without casualties. The next day, the rescued Jews were transported by ferry to Malmö.

The first air attack against the "white buses" happened on 18 April, when the Danish camp at Friedrichsruh was strafed by Allied fighter planes. Four drivers and a nurse were slightly wounded, and ten vehicles were destroyed. In the following days several such attacks from the air occurred, and several personnel were killed and wounded.

== "We're going to Sweden" ==
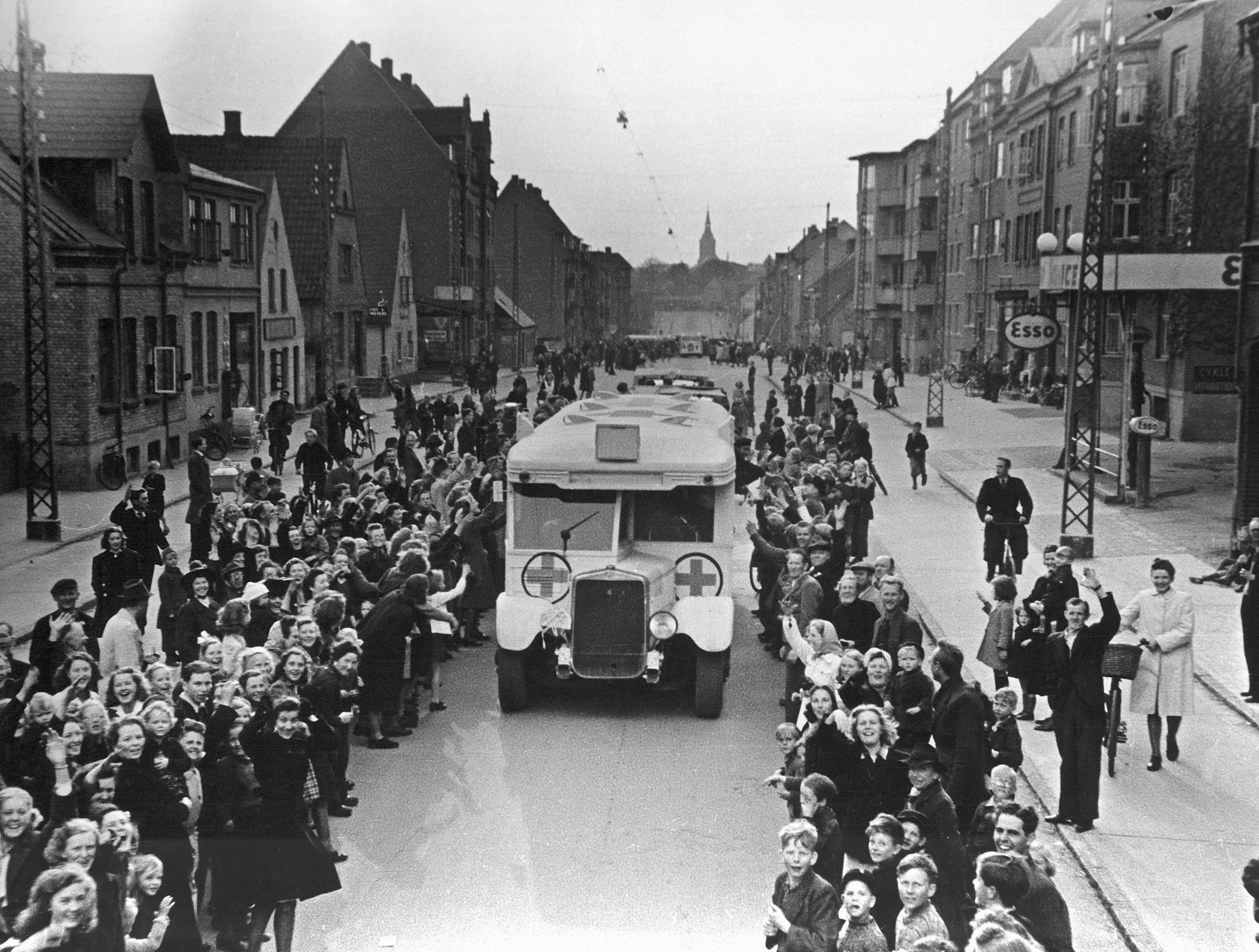
A White Bus passes through Odense, Denmark, 17 April 1945

Through new negotiations Bernadotte got clearance for evacuating severely ill prisoners. The first transport started from Neuengamme on 9 April; 12 Swedish buses and eight Danish ambulances were used. 153 prisoners, most of them confined to bed, were taken to the Danish border and left at Padborg where the Danes had a quarantine station. The prisoners got further rest and treatment before they were transported through Denmark on Danish buses and trains and sent by ferry to Malmö. By 18 April a total of 1,216 sick Danish and Norwegian prisoners had been transported to Sweden. Two days later, all Scandinavian prisoners in Neuengamme had been evacuated.

During the evening of 19 April, the evacuation of Scandinavian prisoners from Neuengamme was discussed in a meeting at Friedrichsruh castle. Bernadotte, Frykmann, and Richert from the Swedish side were present, with Rennau for the Germans while Hvass and Holm represented Denmark. The situation was critical, the existing Swedish and Danish vehicles in Friedrichsruh did not have enough capacity to evacuate the prisoners fast enough. The Danes offered additional vehicles from Jyllandskorpset, and their offer was accepted. A total of 4,255 Danish and Norwegian prisoners were evacuated, by 100 Danish and 20 Swedish buses. After a few days in Denmark, the prisoners were sent on by ferry to Malmö.

== Evacuation from Ravensbrück ==
Ravensbrück was a concentration camp about 90 kilometres (56 mi) north of Berlin, established in 1938 for female inmates. On 8 April around 100 Scandinavian female prisoners, including two French women, were collected from the camp and transported directly to Padborg in Denmark. At this stage Bernadotte had got permission to collect all sick prisoners. On April 22 a column with 15 Danish ambulances under the command of Captain Arnoldson departed from Friedrichsruh to collect the women from Ravensbrück.

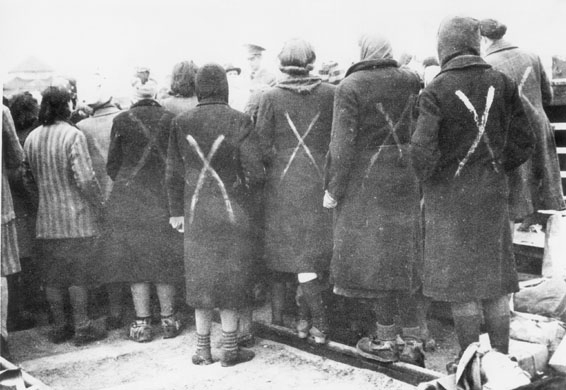
Women prisoners gathered as the Red Cross arrived in Ravensbrück in April 1945. The white paint marks show they are prisoners.

When the column arrived at the camp, it was in chaos as it was to be evacuated due to the advancing Soviet forces. Arnoldson was told he could collect all French, Belgian, Dutch and Polish women, a total of about 15,000. Arnoldson accepted, even though this was more than three times as many as the "white buses" could carry. The ambulances collected 112 sick women, and on arriving in Lübeck, Arnoldson managed to inform Bernadotte that further transport was needed. He promised that all available resources would be mobilised.

Two new columns arrived in Ravensbrück; one departed on April 23 with 786 women, mostly French, who were transported directly to Padborg. The second column collected 360 French women. The last columns arrived in Ravensbrück on 25 April. The situation within Germany was rapidly deteriorating, with frequent attacks on the transports as the Allied forces continued advancing. In the camp a total of 706 French, Belgian, Dutch, and Polish women were loaded onto a column with Danish ambulances and lorries from the International Red Cross. On the way to Padborg this transport was attacked by Allied fighter planes, at least 11 were killed and 26 severely wounded; the final number of fatalities was estimated at 25.

The last column, led by Sub-lieutenant Svenson, transported 934 women, mostly Polish but also French, American and British, in 20 buses. The column rested during the night, was unsuccessfully attacked by fighter planes, and arrived in Padborg on 26 April 1945. This was the last Swedish transport before Germany capitulated. The Swedes were fortunately able to use a train – 50 goods wagons with 80 female prisoners in each wagon. The train departed from Ravensbrück on 25 April and arrived in Lübeck on 29 April. After the passengers had been fed, the train moved on to Denmark. A total of 3,989 female prisoners were rescued by this method. Within a few days around 7,000 female prisoners were evacuated from Ravensbrück to Denmark and then on to Sweden.

== Final evacuees ==
On 28 April, Captain Ankarcrona led a column from the International Red Cross to the camp at Neu-Brandenburg. The transport passed advancing Soviet forces, collected 200 female prisoners and returned to Lübeck. Franz Göring, a Gestapo officer, organized a train from Hamburg which carried about 2,000 women (960 Jews, 790 Poles and 250 French); this train arrived in Padborg on 2 May. It is not counted in the Swedish Red Cross overview of rescued prisoners, but it seems appropriate to mention this transport in connection with the "white buses".

On April 30 the two Swedish ships Magdalena and Lillie Matthiessen sailed from Lübeck, the former with 223 female prisoners, the latter with 225. The transport had been organised by the Swedish doctor Hans Arnoldsson with the assistance of Bjørn Heger. The last group of female prisoners travelled from Copenhagen to Malmö by ferry on 4 May.

On 26 April, the Neuengamme concentration camp itself was emptied as British and Canadian forces closed in; around ten thousand remaining inmates being transferred to a flotilla of decommissioned cruise ships anchored in Lübeck Bay, where they were imprisoned below decks. These prison ships were unmarked with the Red Cross, and were bombed on 3 May by British planes (the Cap Arcona disaster). Most of the prisoners were drowned, strafed from the air, or machine-gunned in the water by the SS guards.

== Reception and accounting ==
The main reception station in Denmark was in the city of Padborg, on the border with Germany; the prisoners received food and medical treatment before they were transported through Denmark to Copenhagen. Transport to Sweden was by ferry to Malmö where the prisoners were received by Länsstyrelsen, (the county administration) and Civilförsvaret, (civil defence). Everyone that arrived was placed in quarantine, due to the risk of spreading infection. In all there were 23 billeting areas, most of them in Malmöhus County with about 11,000 beds. Ambulatory health centres, mostly staffed by Norwegian and Danish doctors and nurses (themselves being refugees), took care of the prisoners. For some of the prisoners it was too late; 110 died after arriving in Sweden, most of them Polish.

According to the Swedish Red Cross a total of 15,345 prisoners were saved, of these 7,795 were Scandinavian and 7,550 from other countries. Around 1,500 German-Swedes were transported to Sweden. A total of 2,000 prisoners were transported from Neuengamme to other camps so that space was available for Scandinavian prisoners. Four hundred French prisoners were transported from Neuengamme or left in Theresienstadt as they could not be delivered to the camp in Flossenbürg.

The "white buses" expedition was a Swedish triumph that earned the country much good will; the return transports through Denmark were met by ecstatic crowds. On 17 May Count Bernadotte af Wisborg was on the balcony of the Royal castle in Oslo with the Norwegian crown prince Olav.

The British diplomat Peter Tennant, who was stationed in Stockholm during the war, wrote:

The Swedish humanitarian efforts during and after the war did much to remove the dishonour the country had got during its acrobatic exercises in neutrality policy.

== White Buses timeline ==
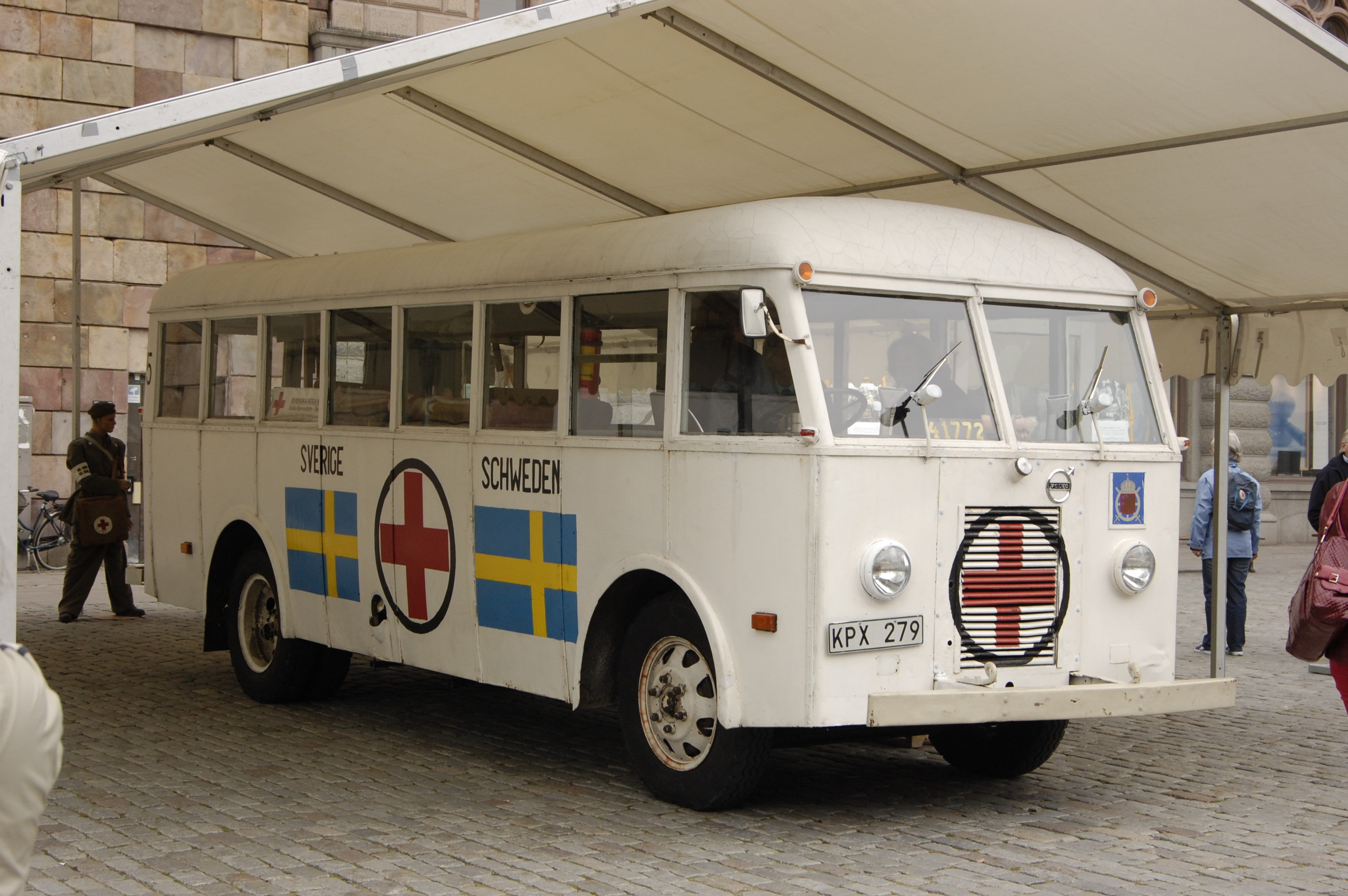
One of the remaining original White Buses

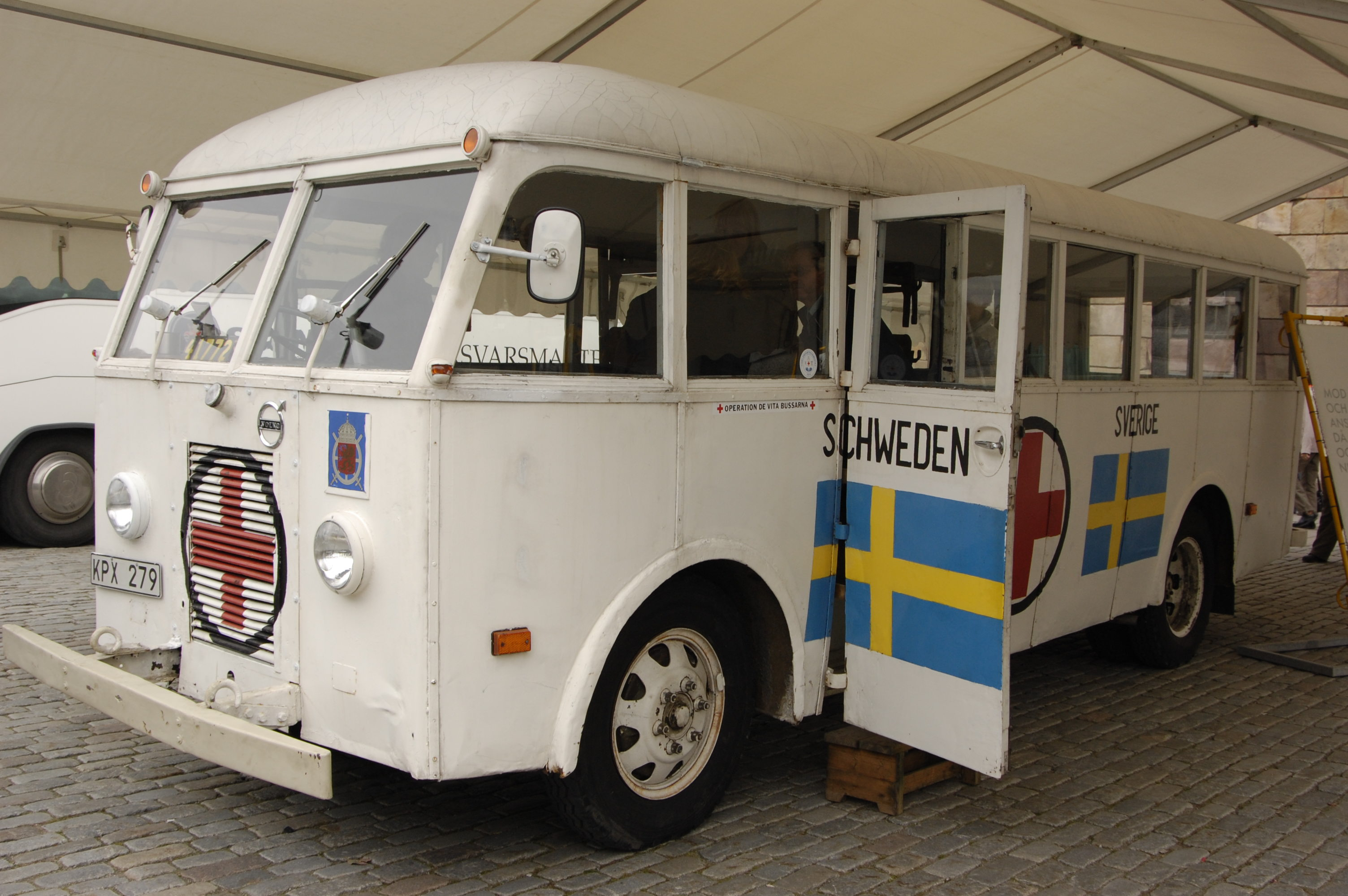
Another view of a White Bus

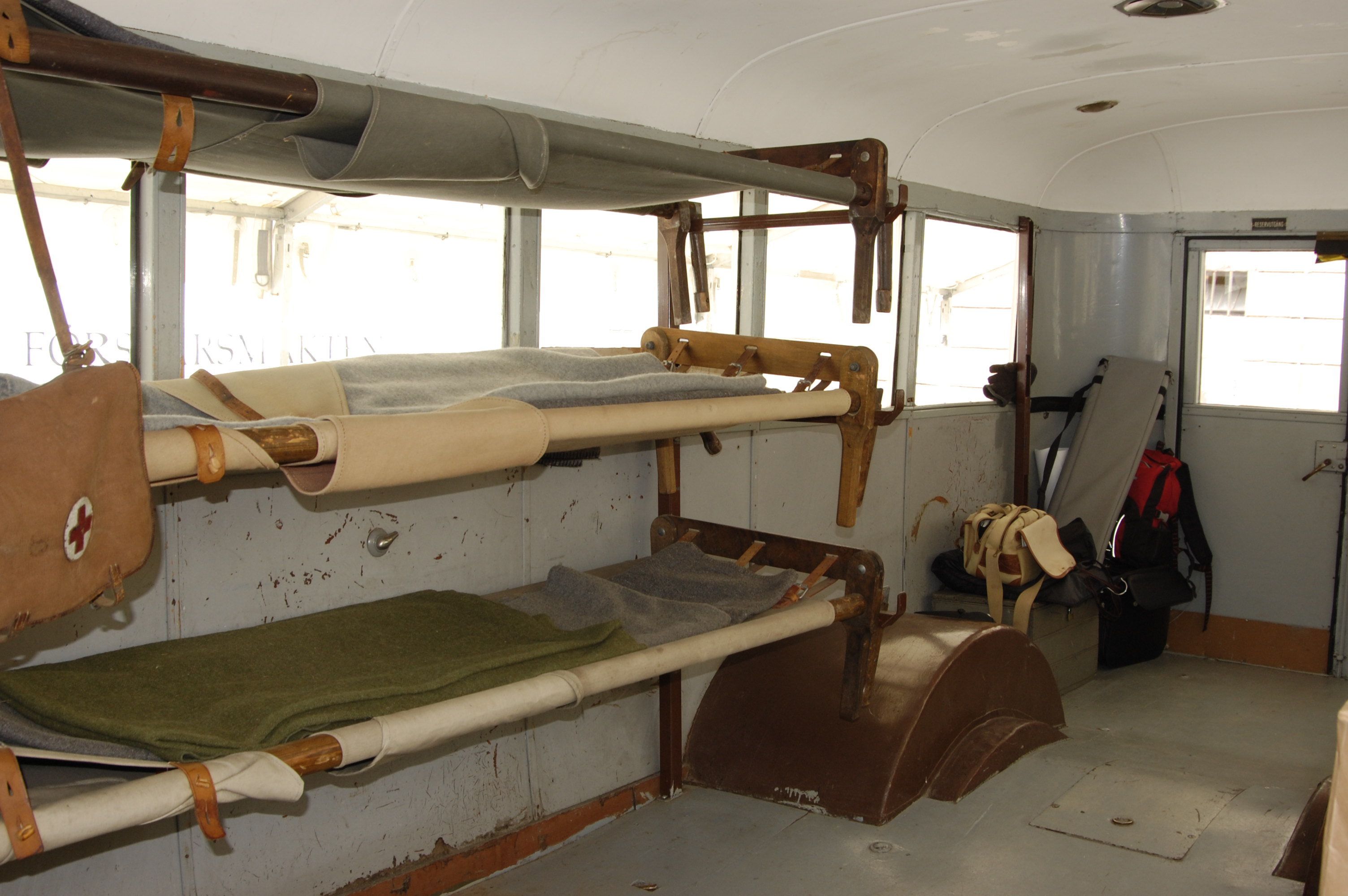
The interior

Year	Month/Date	Event
1940	August	The first Norwegian political prisoners are deported to Germany.
1942	October	The family of Johan Bernhard Hjort, interned at the castle Gross Kreutz outside Berlin, in Germany, start work to support the prisoners.
1943	September	The Danish coalition government resigns; deportations of Danish prisoners to Germany begin.
1944	January	Niels Christian Ditleff establishes contact with the group at Gross Kreutz.
	February	Carl Hammerich visits Sweden and has the first of several meetings with Ditleff, discussing the Scandinavian prisoners.
	22 September	Ditleff meets Bernadotte and suggests a Swedish expedition to save Scandinavian prisoners.
	23 September	Major Johan Koren Christie writes a PM which states that the prisoners shall "stay put".
	October	A report from the Gross Kreutz group written by Johan Bernhard Hjort argues that the Scandinavian prisoners must be moved out of Germany before the war ends.
	December	Felix Kersten, masseur to SS head Heinrich Himmler, manages to free 103 Scandinavian prisoners.
	29 December	The Norwegian government-in-exile in London changes its view and requests that the embassy in Stockholm research a possible Swedish expedition to rescue prisoners in Germany.
1945	5 February	Ditleff sends an official Norwegian PM to the Swedish foreign department, requesting a Swedish expedition to rescue the Scandinavian prisoners.
	16 February	Bernadotte travels to Berlin by plane, meets Himmler and discusses the release of political prisoners.
	29 March	The "white buses" arrive at Friedrichsruh, the base for the expedition in Germany.
	15 March	The first transport from Sachsenhausen to Neuengamme; 2,200 Norwegian and Danes are collected.
	19 March	The first transport collecting prisoners in the south of Germany; 559 prisoners are transported to Neuengamme. Five surviving Norwegian Jews in Buchenwald are left behind.
	26 March	The first transport of Swedish women married to Germans is moved to Sweden.
	27 March	Transport of French, Belgian, Dutch, Polish, and Russian prisoners from Neuengamme to make space for additional Scandinavian prisoners.
	29 March	The Swedish Red Cross gets access to the Neuengamme concentration camp.
	30 March	Transport from the area around Leipzig; some 1,200 prisoners are collected, 1,000 of them Danish police, and all are transported to Denmark.
	2 April	A new Swedish column to the south of Germany, which visits the camps at Mauthausen, Dachau and Vaihingen; 75 prisoners are collected at Neuengamme.
	5 April	About half of the Swedish contingent return to Sweden; they are replaced by Danes.
	8 April	The first transport from Ravensbrück; 100 female prisoners are transported directly to Padborg in Denmark.
	9 April	A Swedish/Danish column travels to Berlin to collect political prisoners from jails; 211 prisoners are transported to Neuengamme. The evacuation of sick prisoners to Denmark begins.
	15 April	A total of 524 political prisoners from jails in Mecklenburg are collected; 423 Jews are transported from Theresienstadt to Denmark and Sweden.
	8 April	The first air attack against the "white buses" occurs at the Danish camp at Friedrichsruh, four Danish drivers and one nurse are slightly wounded.
	20 April	The evacuation of all Scandinavian prisoners from Neuengamme to Sweden through Denmark begins.
	April	Transport of sick prisoners from Ravensbrück; 786 and 360 female prisoners in two columns are taken to Padborg.
	2 April	One column with 934 females and one train with 3,989 female prisoners; the last "white buses" transport leaves from Ravensbrück.
	30 April	The Magdalena with 223 prisoners and Lillie Matthiessen with 225 female prisoners depart from Lübeck.
	2 May	2,000 female prisoners (960 Jews, 790 Poles and 250 French) arrive in Padborg by train.
	3 May	Cap Arcona, a German passenger vessel filled with prisoners from Neuengamme is attacked by the RAF; almost all the 7,500 aboard the vessel die.
	4 May	The last transport leaves with rescued political prisoners, transported by ferry from occupied Copenhagen, Denmark to Malmö, Sweden.

== Results ==
Following an interview, the Swedish newspaper Svenska Dagbladet wrote that Bernadotte succeeded in rescuing 15,000 people from German concentration camps, including about 8,000 Danes and Norwegians and 7,000 women of French, Polish, Czech, British, American, Argentinian, and Chinese nationalities. The missions took around two months, and exposed the Swedish Red Cross staff to significant danger, both due to political difficulties and by taking them through areas under Allied bombing.

After Germany's surrender, the White Buses mission continued in May and June and about 10,000 additional liberated prisoners were thus evacuated.

Bernadotte recounted the White Buses mission in his book The End. My Humanitarian Negotiations in Germany in 1945 and Their Political Consequences, published on 15 June 1945 in Swedish. In the book, Bernadotte recounts his negotiations with Himmler and others, and his experience at the Ravensbrück concentration camp.

== Later controversy ==
After the end of the Second World War the expedition of the "white buses" was widely approved, as a result of the number of prisoners saved. However, the 2005 book Blind Fläck (Blind Spot) by Swedish historian Ingrid Lomfors raised questions regarding the priority given to Scandinavian prisoners. 2000 mostly French prisoners were transported by the White Buses to other concentration camps to make room for Scandinavian prisoners. Most of these French prisoners died during the transport or soon after. Ingrid Lomfors was denied any assistance by the Swedish government in her research on this topic. She met in France with some of the survivors. These survivors explained their hope when they climbed into the Swedish buses that they were being evacuated to Sweden and their crushing despair and feeling of betrayal when they were disembarked.

The issue has been debated in both Swedish and Norwegian newspapers. In a letter in the Norwegian newspaper Aftenposten on 14 October 2005, several ex-political prisoners wrote very critically of Lomfors and ended with:

On behalf of the Swedish government Folke Bernadotte and the crew on the 'white buses' performed the largest Swedish humanitarian action during the Second World War. The Swedish government should as soon as possible erect a monument in tribute to the expedition. Ingrid Lomfors should ask forgiveness from the Swedish Red Cross and the crew of the 'white buses' who risked their lives in the operation.

Bernt H. Lund, a former political prisoner in Sachsenhausen, was positive about the exposure of the moral dilemma that the prisoners experienced. In an article in the newspaper Aftenposten (20 August 2005), he wrote extensively about the privileged status of many Scandinavian prisoners, about the shame of being treated better, and ends the article with:

But it feels right to have this out in broad daylight. A huge thank you to Ingrid Lomfors who in a proper way has removed a blind spot not only for our Swedish liberators, but also for us who assisted them in a difficult situation!

Some of the former prisoners and many of their descendants are still living in the south of Sweden; greater numbers are present in the city of Malmö, where many of them first landed on arriving in Sweden.

According to historian Kjersti Dybvig, the Norwegian government should give an official apology to its Jewish citizens, noting:

Most of the Jews arrested in Norway [by the Nazis] were Norwegian citizens. When arrested, they lost their citizenship. And when the White Buses traveled down [southward from Scandinavia] to fetch prisoners who had survived [the Holocaust], Jews could not join because they were no longer Norwegian citizens, and the [Norwegian] government after 8 May [1945] refused to finance their transportation home.

== See also ==
- Liberation and return of Jewish deportees from Norway during World War II
