= The Song of the Red Ruby =

1956 novel by Agnar Mykle

The Song of the Red Ruby (Sangen om den røde rubin, 1956) is a Norwegian novel written by Agnar Mykle. It is a story of the young Ask Burlefot's personal ride through shame and letdowns that eventually leads to a closer and deeper understanding of himself. It was controversial in Norway and other countries at the time of publication and ended in court as the so-called Mykle Case. This controversy was due to the explicit sexual descriptions in the adventures of the potent main character. In Norway, the publisher was acquitted, but for instance in Finland the book was confiscated and burnt.

The Song of the Red Ruby can also be viewed in connection with Lasso round the moon (novel, 1954), Tyven, tyven skal du hete (novel, 1951) and Rubicon (novel, 1965) as they all have a young man as the protagonist.

The book was later adapted into the feature film Sangen om den røde rubin (1970), directed by Annelise Meineche and starring Ole Søltoft and Ghita Nørby.

== See also ==
- The Song of the Blood-Red Flower
