= Peter Fredrik Holst =

Norwegian physician (1861-1935)

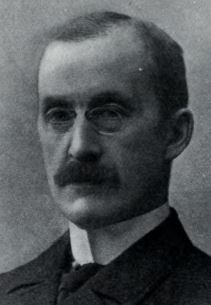
- Born: 23 December 1861; Trondheim, Norway
- Died: 5 January 1935 (aged 73); Oslo, Norway
- Occupations: physician, professor of internal medicine and specialist in cardiology
- Children: Johan Martin Holst
- Relatives: Johan Throne Holst (brother); Henning Throne-Holst (nephew); Harald Throne-Holst (nephew); Johan Bernhard Hjort (son-in-law); Wanda Hjort Heger (granddaughter); Peter F. Hjort (grandson)

Peter Fredrik Holst (23 December 1861 – 5 January 1935) was a Norwegian physician, a professor of internal medicine and specialist in bacteriology and cardiology. He is probably best remembered for his contributions to a widely used textbook in internal medicine.

== Personal life ==
Holst was born in Kristiania to merchant Johan Martin Brodtkorb Holst and Josefa Gørvell. He was a brother of Johan Throne Holst, and thus uncle of Henning Throne-Holst and Harald Throne-Holst. He married Kirstine Eleonore Sartz Fürst in 1891. They were parents of Johan Martin Holst, and their daughter Anna Cathrine married Johan Bernhard Hjort.

== Career ==
Holst graduated as physician in 1888, and was assigned at Lungegaardshospitalet in Bergen, where he worked with Daniel Cornelius Danielssen and Gerhard Armauer Hansen. He further studied anatomical pathology in Berlin under Rudolf Virchow. He was appointed professor of internal medicine at the Oslo University Hospital, Rikshospitalet from 1902 to 1932. He published a few scientific works on bacteriology and cardiology, including a study of the Adams–Stokes syndrome. He edited a widely used textbook in internal medicine, where he wrote the part on cardiology, and this work is regarded his most significant scientific contribution.

Holt was awarded honorary doctoral degrees at universities in Stockholm, Copenhagen and St Andrews. He was decorated Knight, First Class of the Order of St. Olav in 1926, and Commander, Second Class in 1934. He was Commander, Second Class of the Order of Dannebrog, and Commander, Second Class of the Order of the White Rose of Finland.

== Selected works ==
- "Bakteriologiske undersøgelser foretagne i anledning af masseforgiftningen paa Gaustad asyl i 1891". NMFL: 781–894. 1894. (dr. thesis)
- P. F. Holst; K. Faber; K. Petrén (1915). Lærebog i intern medicin. Copenhagen.
