= Conrad Vogt-Svendsen =

Norwegian priest (1914–1973)

Conrad Vogt-Svendsen (6 March 1914 – 1 December 1973) was a Norwegian priest. He was assistant seamen's priest in Hamburg during Second World War, helped with the White Buses operation in 1945, and was later main priest for the deaf in Norway.

== Personal life ==
Vogt-Svendsen was born in Kristiania, the son of shipmaster Johan Fredrik Svendsen and Elisabeth Fredrikke Emilie Larsen. He was married to his cousin Randi Bonnevie-Svendsen from 1945 to 1965, and to Cecilie Torgersen (née Bonnevie) from 1966.

== Career ==
Vogt-Svendsen took his examen artium in 1933, and studied theology at the University of Oslo, graduating in 1940. From 1942 to 1945 he was assistant priest at the seamen's church in Hamburg. Together with seamen's priest Arne Berge he also worked among Scandinavian prisoners in Nazi Germany. The priests made thousands of visits on behalf of the prisoners' families. They helped the prisoners with clothes, and tons of food, fish oil and medicines, brought to Hamburg by ships and distributed to various prisons. They were not allowed to visit the incarcerated in concentration camps, but delivered food supplies such as herring, stockfish and fish oil to the camps. They compiled extensive lists of prisons and prisoners, which were later used as a basis for the White Buses. Vogt-Svendsen was decorated Knight, First class of the Royal Norwegian Order of St. Olav in 1945 for his war contributions. After the war, Vogt-Svendsen served as seamen's priest in the port city of Mobile, Alabama from 1945 to 1947, and in the Italian seaport of Genoa from 1947 to 1951. From 1951 he managed the institution Hjemmet for Døve, a home for the deaf in Nordstrand, which had been founded by his grandfather Conrad Svendsen. In 1968 he was appointed to the position of main priest for the deaf in Norway (Norwegian: hovedprest for Norges døve). He participated in organizations for deaf people, both nationally and internationally in the World Federation of the Deaf. He often worked as an interpreter for deaf, and was engaged in the development of sign language.

== Selected bibliography ==
- 1948: Med Guds ord i fiendeland
- 1962: Menschen der Hoffnung
