= Niels Christian Ditleff =

Norwegian diplomat (1881–1956)

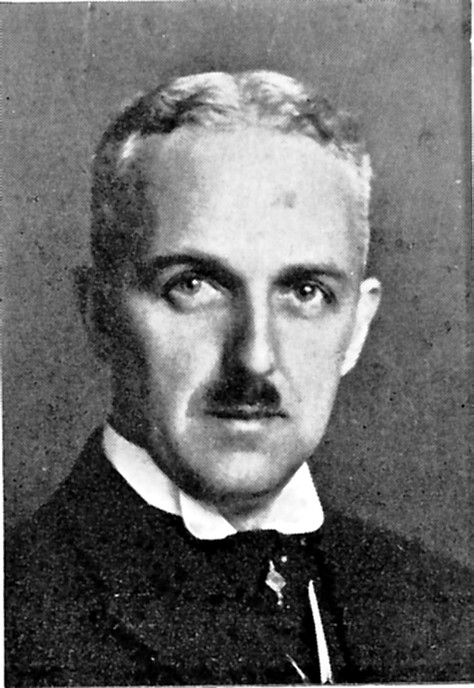
- Born: 29 October 1881; Larvik, Norway
- Died: 18 June 1956 (aged 74); Oslo, Norway
- Resting place: Vår Frelsers Gravlund, Æreslunden
- Other name: Niels Chr Ditleff
- Education: Norwegian Naval Academy
- Occupation: Diplomat
- Years active: 1903–1950
- Employer: Norwegian Ministry of Foreign Affairs
- Known for: Diplomacy up to and including World War II, White Buses
- Spouse: Hanne Hagerup Bull

Niels Christian Ditleff (29 October 1881 – 18 June 1956) was a Norwegian diplomat, noted for his humanitarian efforts on behalf of captives of the Germans during World War 2. In spite of opposition from his own and allied governments, he initiated and organized the White Buses campaign to rescue Scandinavian prisoners in German concentration camps. He was also instrumental in evacuating foreign diplomats from Warsaw during the German invasion and to rescue Jews in coordination with Nansenhjelpen.

== Biography ==
Ditleff was born to a maritime family in the port city of Larvik. His father, a sea captain, died when Niels was only three years old. Niels mustered as a sailor during his youth and was admitted subsequently to the Norwegian Naval Academy. He graduated with a commission as a lieutenant but resigned his commission to pursue a career in diplomacy.

He was stationed first in the Norwegian consulate general in Le Havre from 1903 to 1906 and was thereafter sent as vice consul and chargé d'affaires to missions in Havana, Bilbao, and Lisbon before an interval at the ministry offices in Oslo from 1920 to 1926.

He was stationed in Warsaw during 1926, where he was promoted to ambassador, both to Poland and Czechoslovakia during 1930. He was also accredited to Romania from 1935 to 1937. Although he had to evacuate Warsaw during the German invasion of 1939, he maintained his official role as emissary until the end of the war.

He was stationed as Norway's ambassador to Finland from 1945 to 1950, after which he chose to retire. Ditleff never sought recognition or fame for his contributions.

In addition to his diplomatic career, Ditleff was also an accomplished composer, artist, and playwright. During 1921, he wrote the three-act play Tahove, and another play Statsministeren, which were both shown at Nationaltheatret. He wrote the libretto for the operetta Don Carrambo, played at Den Nationale Scene in Bergen. During the course of his work, he also developed fluency with the languages Portuguese, Spanish, and Polish, in addition to his working knowledge of Norwegian, German, and English. He also published newspaper articles and stories, often with his own illustrations.

At a time when this was unusual, he was also an avid recreational runner, known in the city of Warsaw for his daily runs back and forth along the Vistula River, criss-crossing the bridges. His friend Johan Borgen dubbed him "the running diplomat".

He and his wife Johanne Margrethe Hagerup Bull (daughter of Edvard Hagerup Bull) died in an automobile accident during 1956.

== World War II ==
Ditleff's humanitarian contributions during World War II are related to two specific episodes: the evacuation of foreign diplomats and Jews from Warsaw, and the White Buses campaign to rescue Scandinavians in German concentration camps.

=== Evacuation from Warsaw ===
During the spring of 1939, Ditleff established a transit station in Warsaw for Jewish refugees from Czechoslovakia that had been sent there through the sponsorship of Nansenhjelpen. Ditleff arranged for the refugees to receive food, clothing, and transportation to Gdynia, where they boarded ships bound for Norway.

As German forces approached Warsaw during September 1939, the Polish government and general staff escaped the city; however, most of the foreign diplomatic corps and other foreign nationals remained. Ditleff, acting as the doyen of the corps, tried early to hail German military authorities with a handheld radio to arrange an orderly evacuation. German airplanes tracked the transmission and strafed the car, but he was eventually able to negotiate a 4-hour cease-fire to arrange the evacuation of 1,200 individuals. They left in a convoy consisting of two trucks and sedans. Ditleff himself drove one car for 48 hours until he fell asleep behind the wheel.

=== White Buses ===
Ditleff had returned to Norway by the time Nazi Germany invaded and occupied Norway but was able to escape to Sweden, where he joined the Norwegian legation there.

Ditleff actively opposed the "stay put doctrine" of the Norwegian and Danish governments—the idea that it was safer to let Norwegian and Danish prisoners stay in German concentration camps until hostilities ended, or to evacuate them through dangerous areas—advocating instead trying to retrieve Norwegian and Danish citizens in German concentration camps. During November 1944, he proposed a plan to rescue these prisoners and finally prevailed in securing sponsorship for the White Buses operation that rescued tens of thousands of prisoners during the last months of the war. To negotiate the rescue with the German authorities, he enlisted Folke Bernadotte to act using the good offices of the International Red Cross. Bernadotte subsequently initiated contact with Heinrich Himmler to implement the plan, which ultimately resulted in the evacuation of tens of thousands of refugees.

== Honours ==
Ditleff received a large number of Norwegian and foreign orders and decorations, including:

- Grand Cross of the Order of St. Olav (Norway) (12 March 1946, for his work for Norwegian and Danish prisoners in Germany); Knight 1st Class (1927), Commander with Star (1939)
- Haakon VII's Freedom Cross (Norway)
- Grand Cross of the Order of the Dannebrog (Denmark)
- Commander Grand Cross of the Order of the White Rose of Finland (Finland)
- Grand Cross of the Order of Polonia Restituta (Poland)
- Commander Grand Cross of the Order of the Polar Star (Sweden)
- Order of the Phoenix
- Order of the White Lion (Czechoslovakia)
- Order of the Crown of Romania
- Commander of the Order of Orange-Nassau (Netherlands)
- Order of Christ (Portugal, 1921 Commander, 1940 Grand Cross)
- King Christian X's Freedom Award.
- The Swedish Red Cross' Merit.
- Norwegian Red Cross badges of honor.
