= Arne Berge =

Norwegian priest (1908–1988)

- Born: 29 June 1908; Stavanger, Norway
- Died: 13 August 1988 (aged 80)
- Occupation: Priest
- Known for: Being seamen's priest in Hamburg during World War II, and helping planning and carrying out the White Buses operation.
- Awards: Order of St. Olav; King Christian X's Liberty Medal

Arne Berge (29 June 1908 – 13 August 1988) was a Norwegian priest. He was seamen's priest in Hamburg during World War II, when he also worked among Scandinavian prisoners in Germany, and helped planning and carrying out the operation of the White Buses (De Hvide Busser).

== Background ==
Berge was born in Stavanger as the son of stereotyper Alfred Berge (1878–1962) and his wife Albertine Johanne Husebø (1879–1956). He finished his examen artium at the University of Oslo in 1928, and graduated as cand.theol. in 1934. He was assistant priest in Modum from 1935 to 1936. From 1937 to 1940 he was a priest in Oslo.

== Career ==
Berge was priest at the Seamen's Church (Sjømannskirken) in Hamburg during the Second World War. Berge took over the position previously held by Finn Moestue Husebye, when Huseby had to leave Hamburg because of a conflict with Nazi-friendly Norwegian settlers in Germany.

Together with his assistant priest Conrad Vogt-Svendsen he also worked among Scandinavian prisoners in Nazi Germany, making thousands of visits on behalf of the prisoners' families. They distributed large quantities of clothes and food to prisoners all over Germany. Berge and Vogt-Svendsen compiled extensive lists of prisons and prisoners, which were sent to Stockholm and later used as a basis for the White Buses operation in Spring 1945. They also passed on information on planned mass liquidation of concentration camp prisoners towards the end of the war. The Seamen's Church in Hamburg remained intact until Easter 1945, when it was destroyed in a bomb attack on Good Friday, an attack which killed the church's caretaker Oskar M. Olsen.

After the liberation of Norway, he was a priest at Ilebu prison from 1946, and priest in Horten from 1950. Berge was decorated Knight, First class of the Royal Norwegian Order of St. Olav in 1945, for his work for prisoners in Germany. He was also awarded the Danish King Christian X's Liberty Medal.

== See also ==
- Bombing of Hamburg in World War II

== Other sources ==
- Johannes Holm (1984) Sandheden om de hvide busser (Copenhagen: Samleren Forlag AS) ISBN 978-8756807555
