= Army Medical Service (Norway) =

The Army Medical Service (Hærens sanitet) was a branch of the Norwegian Armed Forces. Dating back to the 19th century, it was dissolved in 2002 when all medical services became part of the Norwegian Armed Forces Medical Services (Forsvarets sanitet).

== Heads ==
- Ole Svennby (1932–1940)
- Johan Holst (1940–1945)
- Carl Semb (1945–present)
- Torstein Dale
