= Radio Nova (Norway) =

Norwegian student radio station

Coordinates: 59.9325°N 10.7125°E

Radio Nova is a non-commercially run student radio station situated and broadcasting in Oslo, Norway, at FM 99.3. The station is run by a team of volunteer journalists and technicians.

The station went on-air for the first time on 16 March 1982, as Norway's first non-Christian, local radio station.

As of 2015, the station broadcasts 60 hours a week between 40 programs. In the course of a week there is a range of different programmes; debates, programs that deal with film, the sciences, literature, music, culture and social questions.

Together with the rest of Norway's student radio stations, Radio Nova introduced a shared endeavor to further the cause of independent/alternative music: a national student radio play-list. The student stations in the three biggest university towns (Oslo, Bergen, and Trondheim) have in cooperation put together the list, but with the expectation it will be played by smaller student stations throughout the country.
