= Groß Kreutz =

- Municipality
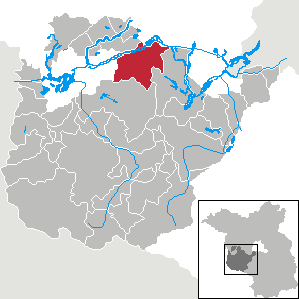
- Location of Groß Kreutz within Potsdam-Mittelmark district
- Interactive map of Groß Kreutz
- Location within Germany Location within Brandenburg
- Coordinates: 52°24′N 12°47′E
- Country: Germany
- State: Brandenburg
- District: Potsdam-Mittelmark
- Subdivisions: 8 Ortsteile

Government
  - Mayor (2019–27): Reth Kalsow (CDU)

Area
  - Total: 98.95 km^{2} (38.20 sq mi)
- Elevation: 33 m (108 ft)

Population (2025-12-31)
  - Total: 8,943
  - Density: 90.38/km^{2} (234.1/sq mi)
- Time zone: UTC+01:00 (CET)
  - Summer (DST): UTC+02:00 (CEST)
- Postal codes: 14550
- Dialling codes: 033207
- Vehicle registration: PM
- Website: www.gross-kreutz.de

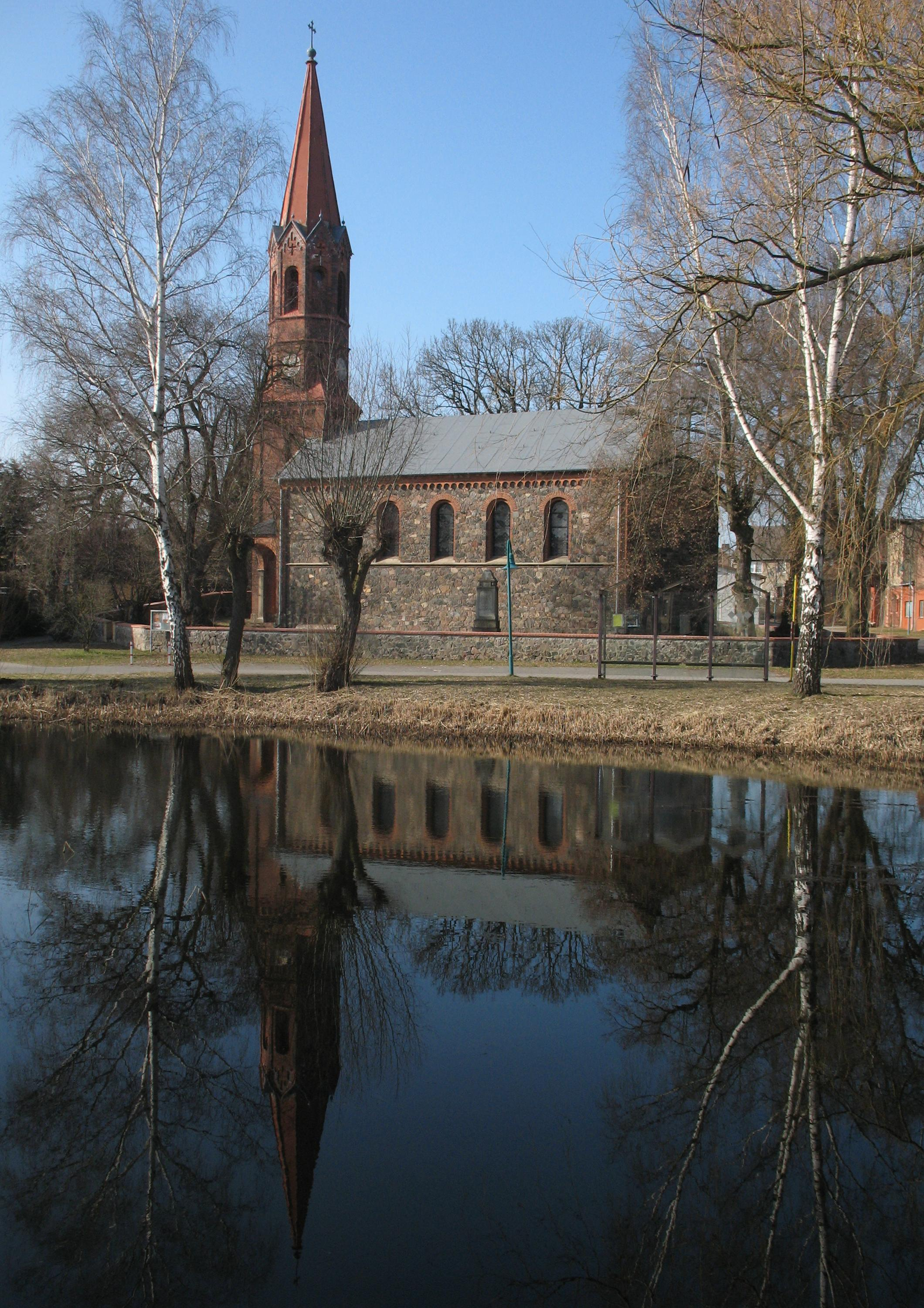
Church in Bochow

Groß Kreutz is a municipality in the Potsdam-Mittelmark district, in Brandenburg, Germany.

== Demography ==
Development of population since 1875 within the current Boundaries (Blue Line: Population; Dotted Line: Comparison to Population development in Brandenburg state; Grey Background: Time of Nazi Germany; Red Background: Time of communist East Germany)

Recent Population Development and Projections (Population Development before Census 2011 (blue line); Recent Population Development according to the Census in Germany in 2011 (blue bordered line); Official projections for 2005-2030 (yellow line); for 2017-2030 (scarlet line); for 2020-2030 (green line)

Groß Kreutz (Havel): Population development
within the current boundaries (2020)

Year	Pop.	±% p.a.
1875	4,371	—
1890	5,068	+0.99%
1910	5,091	+0.02%
1925	5,117	+0.03%
1939	6,858	+2.11%
1950	8,593	+2.07%
1964	7,321	−1.14%

Year	Pop.	±% p.a.
1971	7,332	+0.02%
1981	6,987	−0.48%
1985	7,001	+0.05%
1990	6,993	−0.02%
1995	7,323	+0.93%
2000	8,364	+2.69%
2005	8,474	+0.26%

Year	Pop.	±% p.a.
2010	8,197	−0.66%
2015	8,133	−0.16%
2016	8,275	+1.75%
2017	8,381	+1.28%
2018	8,558	+2.11%
2019	8,618	+0.70%
2020	8,738	+1.39%

== The "Groß Kreutz" Group ==
The settlement gave its name to the Groß Kreutz Group of exiled Norwegians who were active in humanitarian work in the later stages of WWII, and were based at an estate in the area. Group initiatives included the White Buses Operation in the spring of 1945. Members of the group included Johan Bernhard Hjort, Didrik Arup Seip and Wanda Hjort Heger.
