= Snowflake (airline) =

Swedish virtual airline within SAS group

IATA	ICAO	Call sign
SK	SAS	Scandinavian
- Commenced operations: 19 March 2003
- Ceased operations: 31 October 2004
- Operating bases: Copenhagen Airport; Stockholm Arlanda Airport
- Frequent-flyer program: Eurobonus
- Fleet size: 4
- Destinations: 28
- Parent company: SAS Group
- Headquarters: SAS Frösundavik Office Building, Solna Municipality, Sweden
- Website: flysnowflake.com

Snowflake was a low-cost airline that operated out of Stockholm, Sweden, and Copenhagen, Denmark between 30 March 2003 and 30 October 2004. Owned by the SAS Group, it was organized as a business unit within Scandinavian Airlines, operating as a virtual airline using their crew and aircraft. Snowflake served a total 28 destinations from its bases at Stockholm Arlanda Airport and Copenhagen Airport.

The concept was launched using four Boeing 737-800 aircraft. It mainly served Mediterranean holiday destinations, as well as destinations popular with expatriates. From March 2004 two 737 aircraft were replaced with two McDonnell Douglas MD-82s. The airline underestimated its costs and achieved an insufficient load factor, thus making services unprofitable. After operations ended, SAS continued to use Snowflake as a brand for discounted tickets to European destinations.

== History ==
In 2003 SAS underwent a major restructuring program, which largely focused on reducing unit costs. As part of the program, the company's management, in cooperation with McKinsey & Company devised a scheme to better target the leisure market. The models of Ryanair and SAS' partner airline Lufthansa's low-cost subsidiary Germanwings were examined. SAS had just bought its main Norwegian competitor, Braathens, and had also significantly reduced Swedish domestic competition through the purchase of Linjeflyg. The airline was worried about new entrants in these markets, in particular about Ryanair and EasyJet.

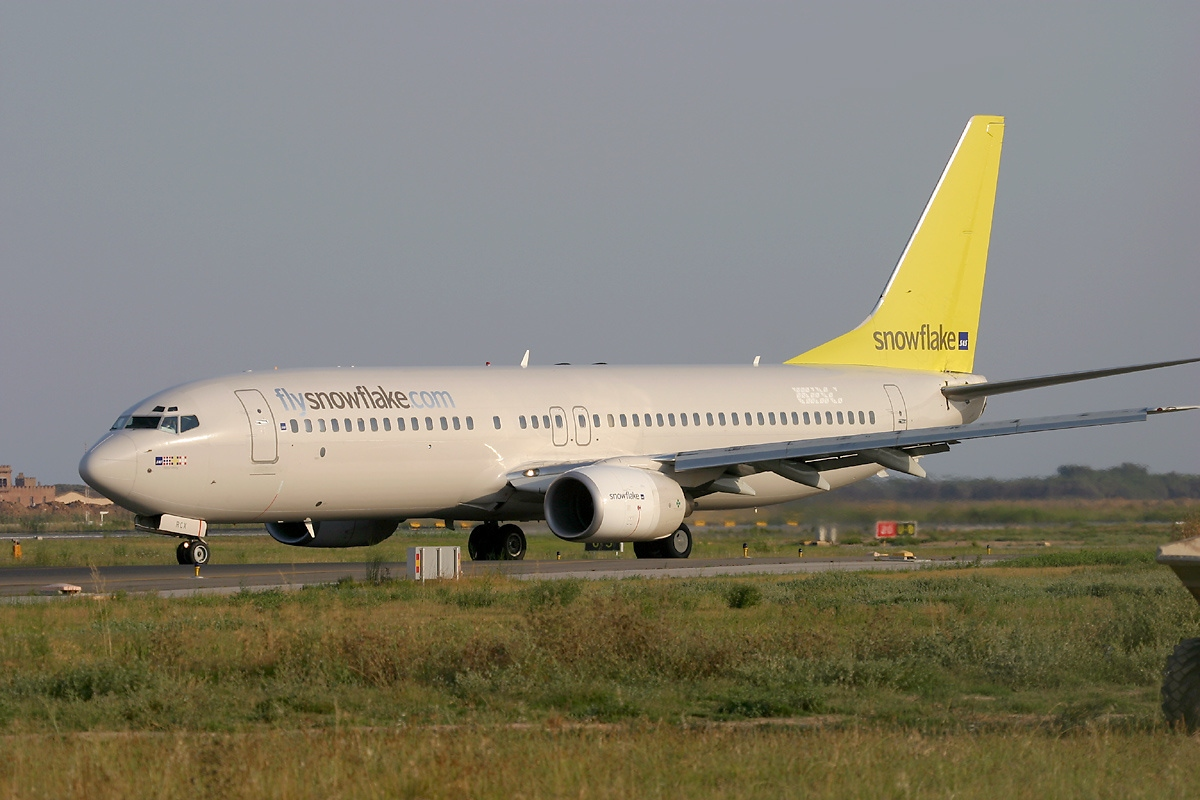
Boeing 737-800 at Barcelona–El Prat Airport

The SAS Group announced plans for the airline on 10 December 2002, at the time giving it the provisional name Scandinavian Light. The company stated that they aimed to create a low-cost airline which would focus on the leisure holiday market and on Mediterranean destinations. SAS hoped that the new airline would target a different market than Scandinavian Airlines and that the latter could instead focus on the business. A challenge for the company was at the time that it had overcapacity after a recent drop in passenger numbers.

The Snowflake brand was announced on 19 March 2003 and services commenced on 30 March. Four Boeing 737-800 were transferred to the new airline and painted in a new livery. Two were stationed at Stockholm Arlanda Airport and two at Copenhagen Airport. SAS chose not to launch the service in Norway. It considered the newly formed SAS Braathens to be a lost-cost carrier and did not see the need for differentiation in the Norwegian market. Ticket prices started at 279 Swedish krona (SEK) and 295 Danish kroner (DKK) plus taxes. About ten seats per departure were sold at that price.

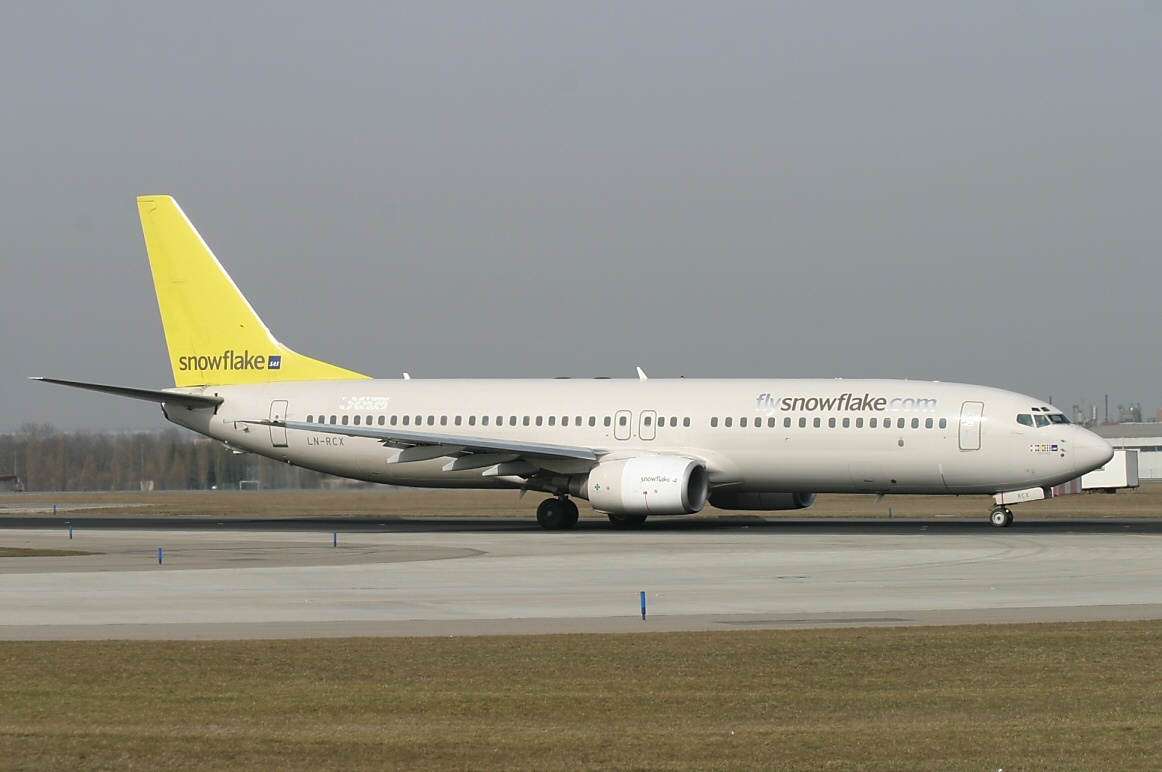
Boeing 737-800 at Prague Ruzyně Airport

The first services were from Stockholm to Alicante, Athens, Barcelona, Bologna, Budapest, Dublin, Istanbul, Málaga, Nice, Prague and Rome. From Copenhagen the airline's first flights were to Alicante, Athens, Bologna, Lisbon, Málaga, Palma de Mallorca, Pristina and Sarajevo. The latter two were particularly aimed at expatriates, rather than tourists. By May the airline had achieved a load factor of seventy percent, increasing to eighty-two percent by September. Snowflake then announced three new destinations from Stockholm from the start of the winter program in October: Lyon, Beograd and Beirut. The latter two were mainly aimed at expatriates. A new fare scheme was introduced from 1 October, whereby there were eight price levels, ranging from €58 to €228. It also started offering discounted booking fees for tickets bought online. In November Snowflake announced that it would end services to Dublin and Barcelona, citing low profitability. Scandinavian Airlines started to serving Dublin itself.

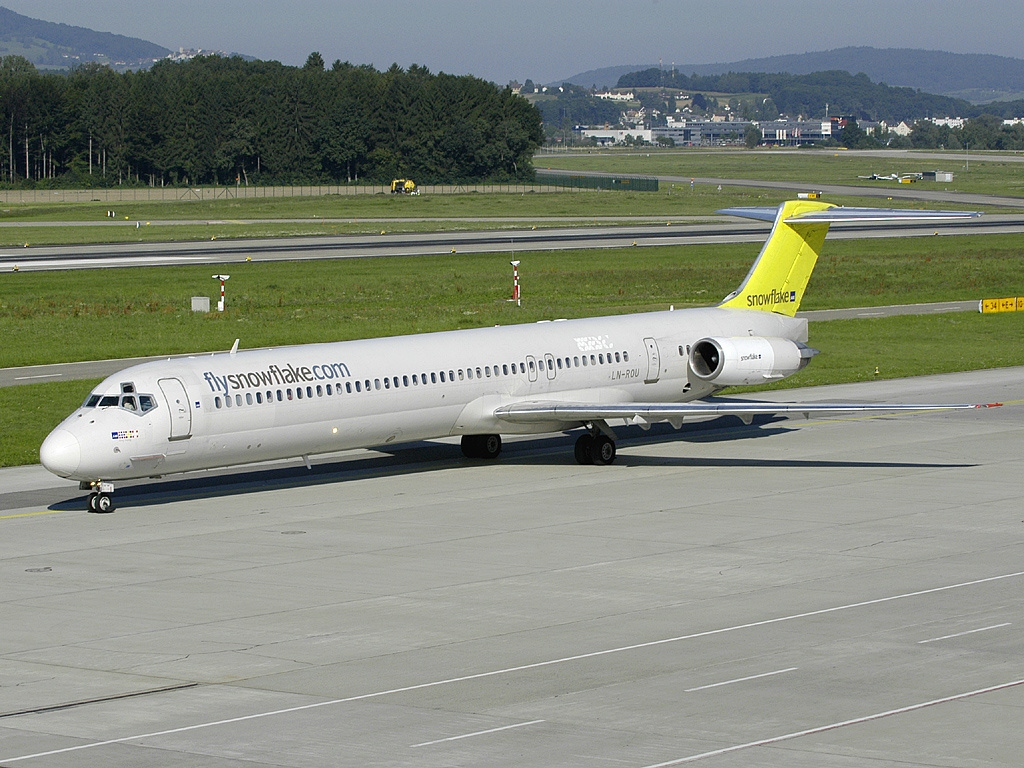
McDonnell Douglas MD-82 at Zürich Airport

Snowflake was hit by a strike within the SAS Group starting on 1 February 2004 amongst ground handlers. From February Snowflake introduced services from Stockholm to Bilbao and Olbia. Starting with the 2004 summer schedule, commencing 28 March, SAS introduced additional services. From Copenhagen the airline started flights to Ankara, Beirut, Skopje, Split and Valletta. From Stockholm services were introduced to Ankara, Inverness, Lisbon, Palma de Mallorca, Split, Skope and Valletta. At the same time two more aircraft, 156-seat McDonnell Douglas MD-82s, were introduced to the Snowflake fleet.

In May 2004 the load factor drop to forty percent. Snowflake announced large cutbacks to the winter schedule, and planned to only operate four services: to Athens, Istanbul, Nice and Rome. This was down from thirteen during the previous winter season. With two flights each per week, this resulted in a very low fleet utilization rate. Snowflake had originally had success with their expatriate routes, but from 2004 passenger numbers fluctuated significantly on those routes. Similar cuts were carried out in Copenhagen: services were reduced to ten per week. This included the announcement of a new destination – Cairo. Two services, to Dublin and Prague, were taken over from Stockholm by Scandinavian Airlines. A further four destinations were cut with the winter program. All services to Spain were taken over by Spanair, which at the time was also owned by the SAS Group.

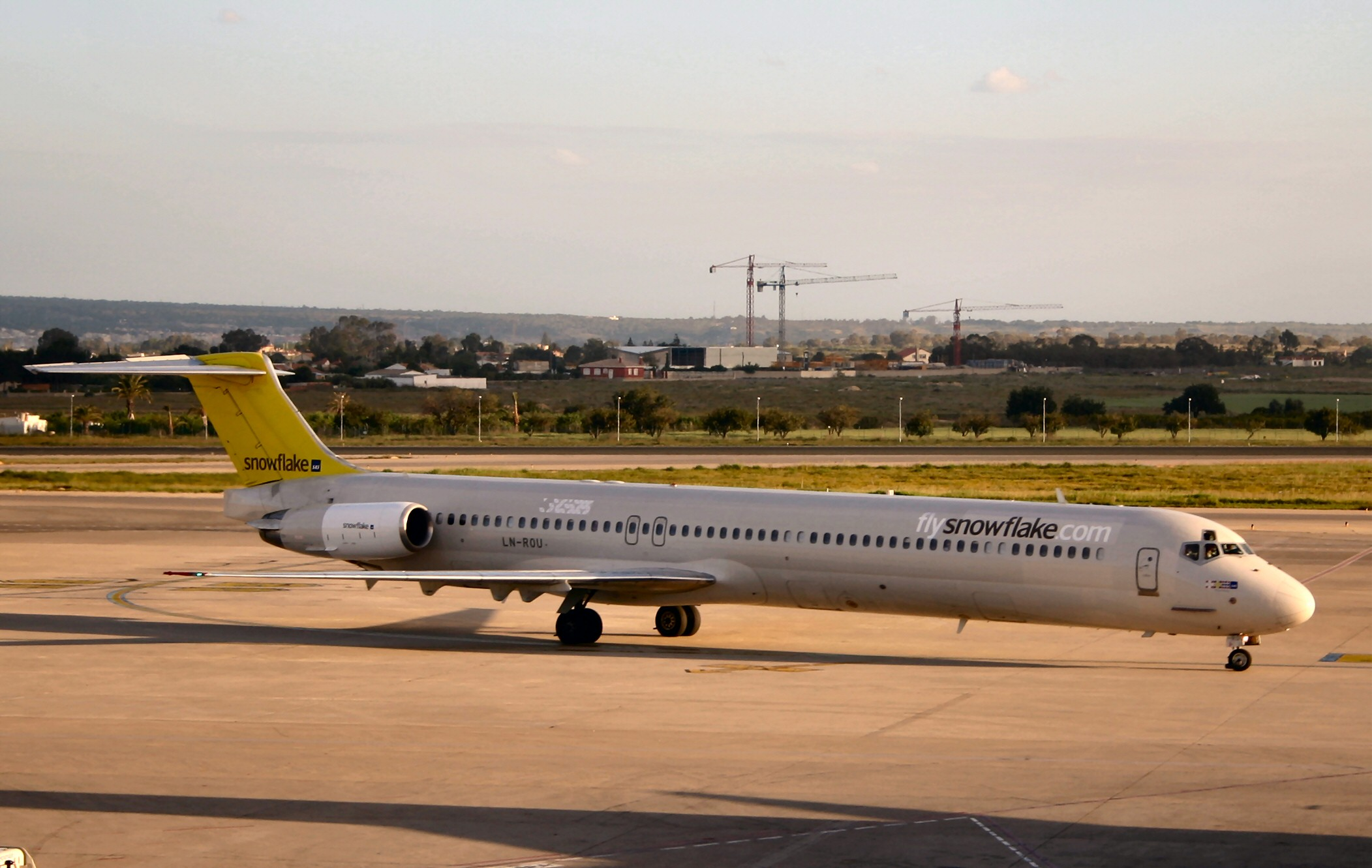
McDonnell Douglas MD-82 at Alicante Airport

The load factor increased to eighty percent during the summer months. SAS announced on 18 August 2004 that it would terminate Snowflake services with effect 30 October. Snowflake would continue to exist as a brand name for discount tickets to European destinations.

== Operations ==
Snowflake's business model was not the same as that of Scandinavian Airlines. Snowflake was organized as a business unit with in SAS Group, in the same manner as Scandinavian Airlines. The airline was thereby just a brand employed for particular services. The aircraft operated with Scandinavian Airlines' aircraft, crew and codes. The two also shared management. Snowflake was organized to become an internal customer within the group, for instance purchasing ground services from SAS Ground Services.

A key component to the operations was that the Snowflake services would be able to operate at a lower cost than the main airline. However, it soon proved that the company was not able to achieve the internal prices that were used in calculating costs. For instance, Snowflake incurred the same ground handling costs as Scandinavian Airlines. No discounts were therefore granted from SAS Ground Services or external ground handling providers. Similarly, if a Snowflake aircraft became sufficiently delayed, a conventional SAS aircraft would be dispatched instead.

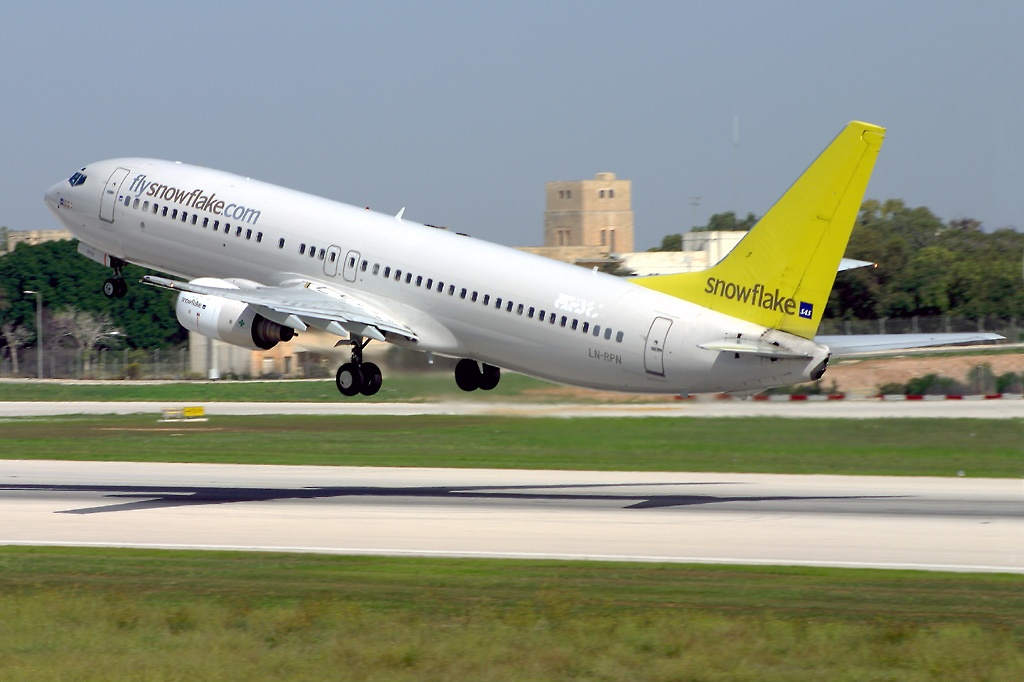
Boeing 737-800 at Malta International Airport

Snowflake was able to avoid many of the costs related to operating a network system. To begin with it operated only a single type of aircraft. These started and ended each day at their home base, avoiding accommodation costs for crews. The Snowflake business unit employed only five people.

Snowflake incurred the same overhead costs as Scandinavian; the lack of a clear separation between the airlines at an operational level meant that Snowflake never succeeded in lowering unit costs below that of Scandinavian Airlines. Finally, operating only four aircraft was too small a fleet to achieve the necessary economy of scale. With the ticket prices based on cost savings which never materialized, the airline failed to operate with a profit.

== Service ==
Tickets were sold online and by telephone. They had a lower base price, additional services, including in-flight meals cost extra. Surcharges were also charged by travel agencies, which sold tickets for an interim period. The airline only operated point-to-point services, rather than the network model used by Scandinavian Airline. Tickets were sold one-way and did not require a round trip and staying away over a Saturday to claim discounts. However, they did not support interlining.

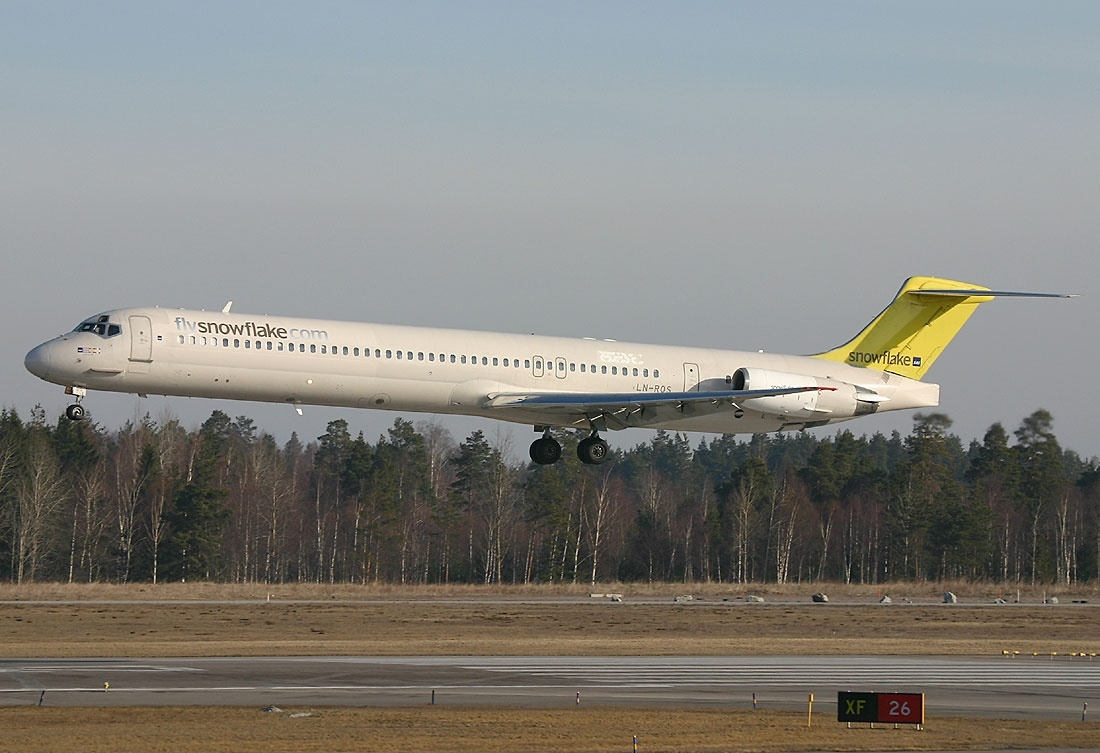
McDonnell Douglas MD-82 at Stockholm Arlanda Airport

Standard fare included one piece of checked-in luggage. The airline had a selection of in-flight meals, food and beverages for sale. Customers could redeem miles earned through SAS' loyalty program Eurobonus, but miles could not be earned on flights with Snowflake. Snowflake services were popular for redemption because of the concentration of leisure destinations.

== Fleet ==
The airline initially operated a fleet of four Boeing 737-800, with two aircraft based in Stockholm and two in Copenhagen. From March 2004 the two 737s in Copenhagen were replaced with two McDonnell Douglas MD-82. All aircraft were owned and operated by Scandinavian Airlines, but retained a distinctive livery with a lemon-colored vertical stabilizer and otherwise white body. They had single-class seating in a more dense configuration than in SAS' conventional aircraft. All the aircraft were registered in Norway.

Snowflake fleet
Aircraft	Image	Quantity	Seating
Boeing 737-800		4	150
McDonnell Douglas MD-82		2	156

== Destinations ==
Snowflake operated flights to a series of destinations from its bases in Copenhagen and Stockholm. They flew out of Terminal 2 at Copenhagen and Terminal 5 at Stockholm. Most flights had a limited frequency, typically one to four times per week. Flights operated to primary airports and not remote airports. To avoid cannibalizing customers from Scandinavian Airlines, Snowflake only flew to destinations not served by the other part of the group. This included several popular tourist destinations, such as London and Paris, which also attracted a large share of business travelers.

Snowflake destinations
City	Country	Airport
Alicante	Spain	Alicante Airport
Ankara	Turkey	Esenboğa International Airport
Athens	Greece	Athens International Airport
Barcelona	Spain	Barcelona–El Prat Airport
Beirut	Lebanon	Beirut–Rafic Hariri International Airport
Belgrade	Serbia and Montenegro	Belgrade Nikola Tesla Airport
Bilbao	Spain	Bilbao Airport
Bologna	Italy	Bologna Guglielmo Marconi Airport
Budapest	Hungary	Budapest Ferenc Liszt International Airport
Copenhagen	Denmark	Copenhagen Airport^{[Base]}
Dublin	(Republic of Ireland) Ireland	Dublin Airport
Inverness	United Kingdom	Inverness Airport
Istanbul	Turkey	Atatürk International Airport
Lisbon	Portugal	Lisbon Portela Airport
Lyon	France	Lyon–Saint Exupéry Airport
Málaga	Spain	Málaga Airport
Nice	France	Nice Côte d'Azur Airport
Olbia	Italy	Olbia Costa Smeralda Airport
Palma de Mallorca	Spain	Palma de Mallorca Airport
Prague	Czech Republic	Václav Havel Airport Prague
Pristina	Serbia and Montenegro	Pristina International Airport
Rome	Italy	Leonardo da Vinci–Fiumicino Airport
Sarajevo	Bosnia and Herzegovina	Sarajevo International Airport
Skopje	(North Macedonia) Macedonia	Skopje Airport
Split	Croatia	Split Airport
Stockholm	Sweden	Stockholm Arlanda Airport^{[Base]}
Luqa	Malta	Malta International Airport
Venice	Italy	Venice Marco Polo Airport
