= Scandinavian Airlines Connect =

Low-cost airline subsidiary of Scandinavian Airlines

Scandinavian Airlines Ireland Ltd.

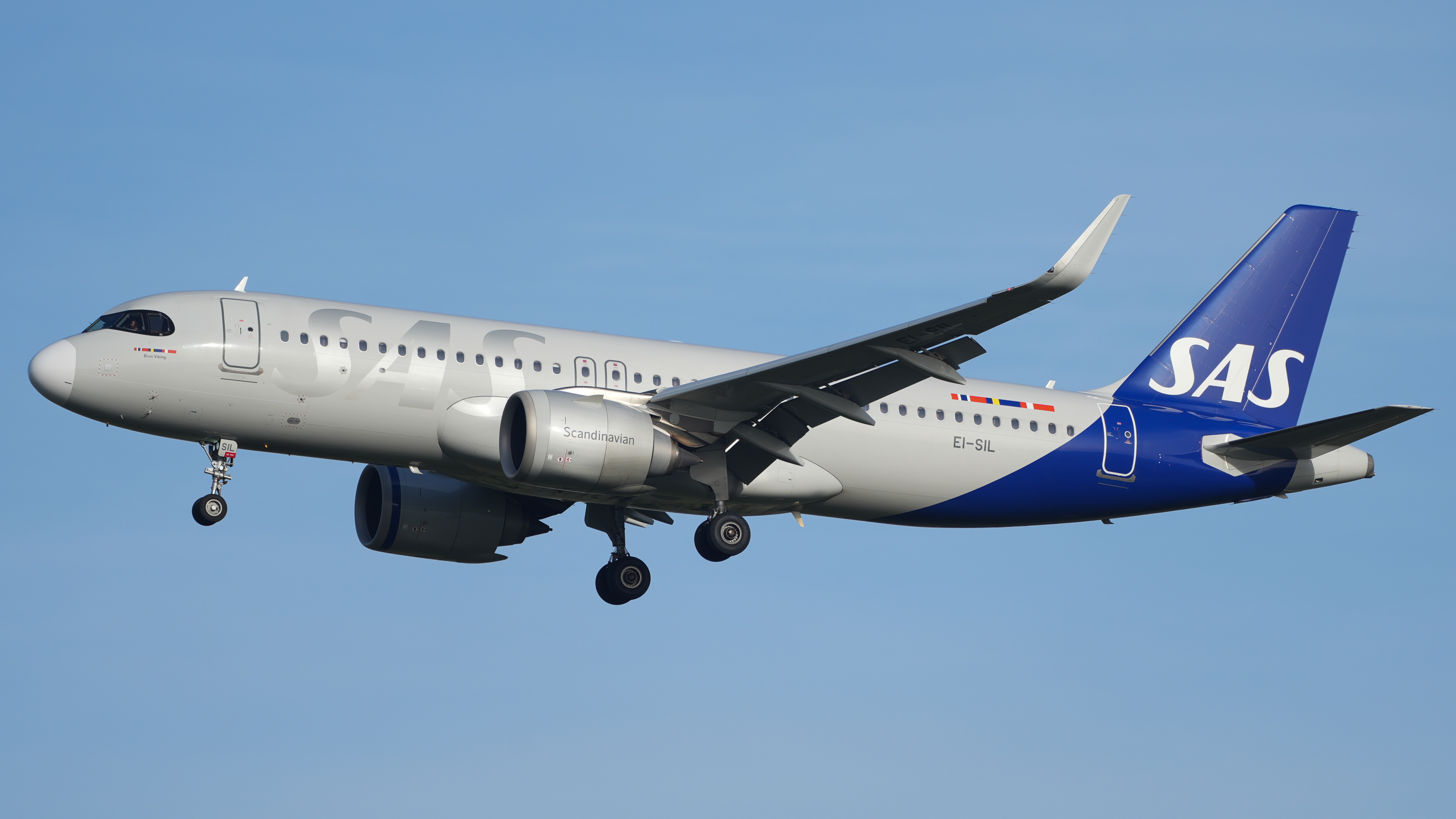
- SAS Connect Airbus A320neo
IATA	ICAO	Call sign
SL	SZS	SPINNAKER
- Founded: 2017; 9 years ago (as SAS Ireland)
- Commenced operations: 20 December 2017; 8 years ago (as SAS Ireland); November 2021; 5 years ago (as SAS Connect)
- Operating bases: Copenhagen; London–Heathrow; Stockholm–Arlanda
- Frequent-flyer program: EuroBonus
- Alliance: SkyTeam (affiliate)
- Fleet size: 33
- Parent company: SAS Group
- Headquarters: Dublin, Ireland
- Website: www.flysas.com

Scandinavian Airlines Ireland Ltd, also known as SAS Connect, and previously SAS Ireland, is a subsidiary of Scandinavian Airlines (SAS), and by extension SAS Group. The airline exclusively operates flights on behalf of SAS with a fleet of Airbus A320neo aircraft.

== History ==
SAS set up the subsidiary as SAS Ireland in early 2017 and expected it to be operational by 1 November 2017. Initially, the airline was expected to be equipped with nine brand new Airbus A320neo aircraft; five aircraft to commence flights out of London Heathrow, and later from Málaga in spring 2018, with the remaining four aircraft on behalf of its parent company.

SAS' intention was to replace its own aircraft with cheaper ones crewed and based outside Scandinavia to compete better with other airlines. The airline did not intend to employ its own staff, which was instead carried out by CAE, an aviation recruitment firm. CAE subsequently began the employment of the back end personnel in 2017.

The Swedish Pilots Union expressed its dissatisfaction with the operational structure of the new airline, suggesting it violated the current labour-agreements. The union also lamented the lack of coverage in Scandinavian media. The Swedish Cabin Crew Union also condemned the new venture, and stated that SAS established the airline to "not pay decent salaries" to cabin crew. Jonas Sjöstedt, the former leader of the Swedish Left Party told a newspaper that the government of Sweden would have to stop the establishment of the new airline, but the Swedish minister for enterprise, Mikael Damberg told the same paper that "it is not an issue for the owner if the company decides to open bases abroad".

Citing delivery delays, SAS Ireland had to delay its launch until December 2017. The first revenue flight took place on 20 December 2017 from Copenhagen to London Heathrow.

In the summer of 2018, many flights intended to be operated by SAS Ireland were either cancelled or operated by the parent. At the same time, 26 pilots at SAS Ireland sent a letter to the corporate governance at SAS Group criticising working conditions and safety levels. The chief instructor at SAS Ireland resigned after being criticised for having safety standards which were too high. During the brief period, that the airline had been operating, they experienced the leave of a number of pilots with most of the ones that were still employed were actively looking for new employment.

In April 2020, SAS Ireland announced the closure of its Málaga base. In May 2021, it was announced that SAS Ireland would set up a base in Copenhagen, initially operating a fleet of 3-5 A320neo aircraft. SAS and the Danish union FPU (a part of the Danish Confederation of Trade Unions or FH) have signed a new collective bargaining agreement for pilots and cabin crew. In September 2021, SAS announced that SAS Ireland would be renamed SAS Connect, and later reported that operations based in Copenhagen would launch in early 2022.

== Fleet ==
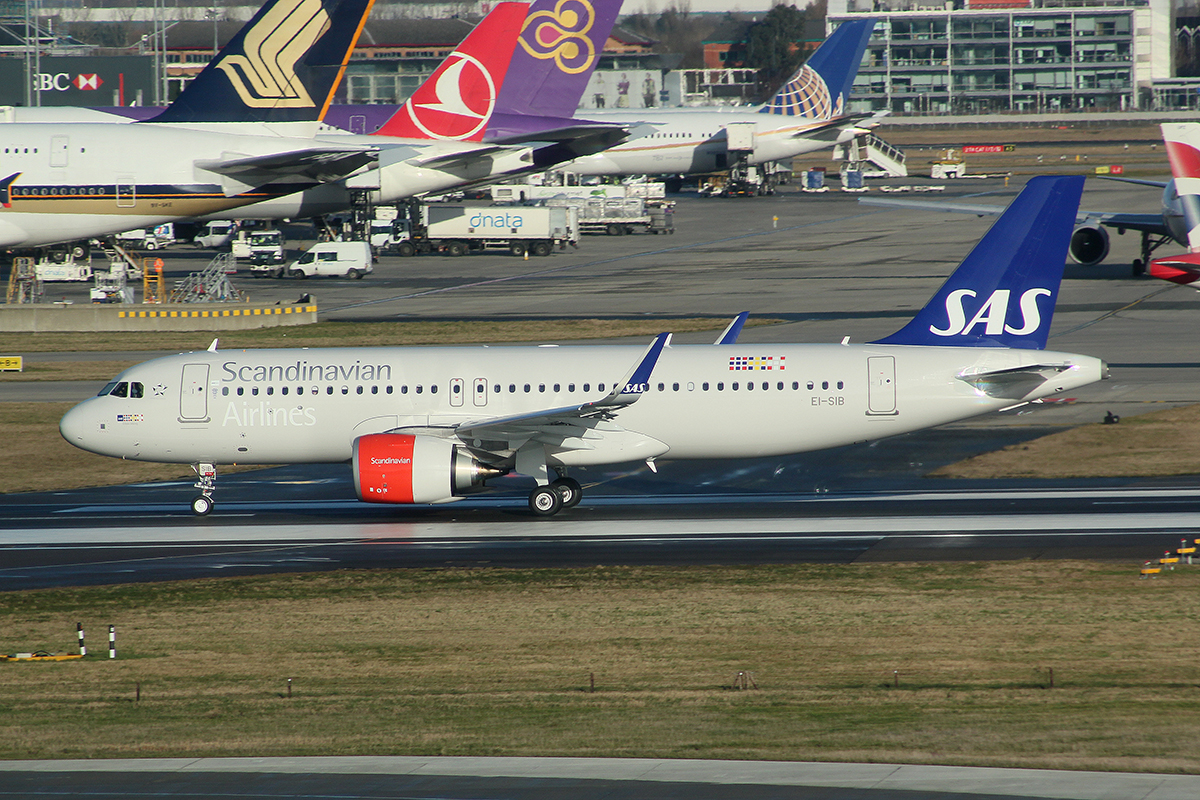
SAS Connect Airbus A320neo

=== Current fleet ===
As of July 2026, SAS Connect operates the following aircraft:

Scandinavian Airlines Connect fleet
Aircraft	In service	Orders	Passengers	Notes
Airbus A320neo	33	—	180	Operated for Scandinavian Airlines.
Total	33	—		

=== Former fleet ===
As of August 2025, SAS Connect operated 32 Airbus A320neo.
