= Alcazar (airline) =

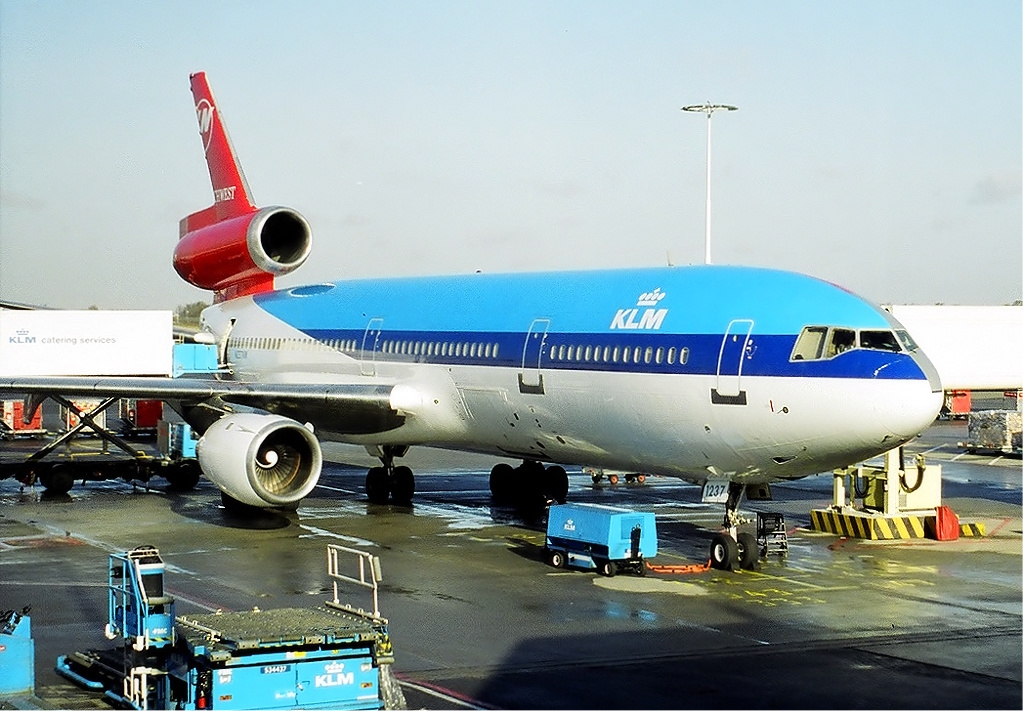
KLM McDonnell Douglas DC-10 in a hybrid livery with Northwest Airlines

Alcazar was a 1993 proposal to merge Austrian Airlines, KLM, Scandinavian Airlines System (SAS), and Swissair to create Symphony, which would have been Europe's largest airline.

== Background ==
Since the 1944 signing of the Convention on International Civil Aviation, international aviation was based on bilateral air transport agreements, in which government would negotiate the rights of one or more flag carriers to operate routes between the countries. The negotiations focused on retaining each country's flag carrier's market share and also effectively hindered any airline from not being domestically owned—either by the government or by private investors. In 1992, the United States started negotiating open skies agreements with the European Union (EU), which would allow any European airline to fly from any airport in their home country to any airport in the US, and similarly any US airline to fly from any US airport to any European airport.

In the 1980s, SAS, Swissair, Austrian Airlines, and Finnair had attempted to establish European Quality Alliance (EQA). In addition to codesharing and joint marketing, the alliance was largely based around technical issues and using the EQA brand as a "seal of quality". These had largely stranded because Finnair felt that SAS goal was to use Finnair as a feeder airline to SAS' hub at Copenhagen Airport. There had also been previous discussions between SAS and Swissair, and SAS and KLM for mergers, without success. In 1992, Swissair and Austrian Airlines had established the common frequent-flyer program Qualiflyer.

In 1988, SAS had bought 18.4% of Texas Air Corporation, the holding company which owned Continental Airlines. The two airlines had started a strategic cooperation, such as SAS moving its New York services from John F. Kennedy International Airport to Newark Liberty International Airport. KLM was cooperating with British Airways, Virgin Atlantic, and Sabena. In addition, they had a strong tie with Northwest Airlines. In 1989, KLM bought 20% of the then-ailing Northwest. In 1992, KLM had made a bailout purchase of Northwest, securing a 25% ownership of the airline, which is the maximum a foreign airline is allowed to own in a US airline. Swissair cooperated with Delta Air Lines and Singapore Airlines in a triangular cooperation, which was highly valued by the company's management. Delta was significantly larger than the other two US partner airlines, and had a base in New York City, rather than Northwest's hubs at Detroit Metropolitan Wayne County Airport and Minneapolis–Saint Paul International Airport. Austrian Airlines lacked a US partner.

In Europe, the European Commission (EC) was working on plans to deregulate the aviation market, similar to the US Airline Deregulation Act of 1978. The Commission received support from the Netherlands and the United Kingdom, while most other countries and the International Air Transport Association (IATA) were opposed to deregulation. In 1991, the Gulf War broke out. The price of oil escalated, while the demand for business travel diminished. After a 1992 Swiss referendum rejected Swiss membership in the European Economic Area, Swissair was concerned they would not be able to have access to the European market. With its small home market, it was dependent on international partners to feed its hub.

== Proceedings and issues ==
Jan Carlzon, the then-CEO of SAS, took the initiative for the merger process. He believed that a deregulated European airline market would result in five large airline conglomerates, and launched the strategy "one of five in 95" whereby the SAS Group would be one of five large players in the European market by 1995. At the time, SAS was the fourth-largest airline in Europe, behind Lufthansa, British Airways, and Air France. Carlzon envisaged that the smaller flag carriers should merge to create a large company. The plan was to allow the smaller airlines increased economy of scale, particularly on intercontinental flights. For instance, Lufthansa had 20% lower unit costs than SAS on international routes.

SAS proposed that the new airline be organized as a consortium, in the same way SAS had been organized since 1946. This involved six national companies each owning a share of the new airline. However, SAS' then structure violated EU regulations, and would therefore have to gain permission from the supranational organization, which was largely controlled by the owners of SAS' main competitors.

The airlines agreed to attempt as many point-to-point transit flights as possible, although they would still have to operate some flights via a hub-and-spoke network. Specifically, SAS would degrade Stockholm Arlanda Airport and Oslo Fornebu Airport from hub status, and instead focus its traffic at Copenhagen Airport, which would become the main hub for flights to China, Japan and Korea. Swissair's hub at Zurich Airport would become the main hub for flights to Africa, the Middle East, India and Southeast Asia and KLM's hub at Amsterdam Airport Schiphol would become the main hub for flights to South America, while Austrian Airlines' hub at Vienna International Airport would become the main hub for flights to Eastern Europe.

The airlines operated three different long-haul aircraft: SAS used Boeing 767s, Swissair McDonnell Douglas MD-11s, while KLM operated Boeing 747s. Other non-conformities between the airlines included SAS using Amadeus and KLM using Galileo as their computer reservations system. To resolve issues with the labour unions, the airlines decided to organize the company with each of the airlines retaining their own aircraft and hiring their own flight crew and technical crew, with the merged company being a virtual airline.

The last issues discussed during the merger talks was the location of the head office, the main hub, choice of US partner, the CEO and chair positions, and the ownership. The negotiations took a pause in July and August, and resumed in September. By then the project was meeting opposition from SAS' Danish labour unions, who were concerned about the new airline's position in Copenhagen, as KLM's main hub in Amsterdam was considered too close to Copenhagen. Swissair had a 70% higher labour cost level than KLM.

The airlines agreed to an ownership structure of 30% each for SAS, KLM, and Swissair, and 10% for Austrian Airlines. Swissair had higher profits and more share capital than the other airlines, and was nearly debt-free and owned almost all their aircraft. Because of this, the airline was to receive compensation from the other airlines. SAS agreed to sell its share in and terminate its cooperation with Continental Airlines. However, neither Swissair nor KLM were willing to abandon their American partners. However, SAS demanded that the head office be located in Copenhagen. After negotiations, KLM agreed to terminate their cooperation with Northwest Airlines, and Jan Carlzon was proposed as CEO. With the business operations division being headquartered in Vienna, KLM demanded and got acceptance for the head office to be located in Amsterdam. The new company was to be named Symphony.

On 21 November 1993, KLM announced that they would not participate in the merger, stranding the deal. The airline had not succeeded at gaining support amongst key stakeholders, such as Dutch banks, aircraft manufacturers, and labour unions at Northwest.

== Aftermath ==
Immediately following the end of the negotiations, all four airlines stated that they would continue to look for new merger partners. Jan Carlzon was dismissed as CEO of SAS on 28 September 1993. Rainer Gut was forced to leave Swissair in April 1995. Swissair chose to stay outside the large alliances, instead creating SAirGroup and purchasing minority stakes a number of smaller airlines in Europe, creating the Qualiflyer Group in 1999. Swissair also lost its connections with Delta Air Lines in June 1999, when Delta began to work closely with Air France, which led to the foundation of the SkyTeam alliance on 22 June 2000. In October 2001, Swissair was declared bankrupt. SAS joined forces with Lufthansa, who along with United Airlines, Air Canada, and Thai Airways International founded Star Alliance on 14 May 1997. KLM continued to integrate its operations with Northwest Airlines. In 1998, KLM attempted a full-fledged merger with Alitalia, but the agreement was abandoned by KLM. KLM was bought by Air France on 5 May 2004 to create Air France–KLM, in which both airlines are considered separate brands. Following Swissair's collapse, its former subsidiary Crossair took over its erstwhile parent's intercontinental network, rebranding itself as Swiss International Air Lines; despite initially seeking a partnership with British Airways, it was eventually taken over by Lufthansa in 2005 and joined the Star Alliance as a consequence. In October 2023, Air France–KLM would purchase 20% of SAS' stake, which prompted the latter to leave Star Alliance on 31 August 2024 and join SkyTeam on 1 September 2024.
