= SAS Link =

Regional airline of Denmark, Norway and Sweden

SAS Link AB

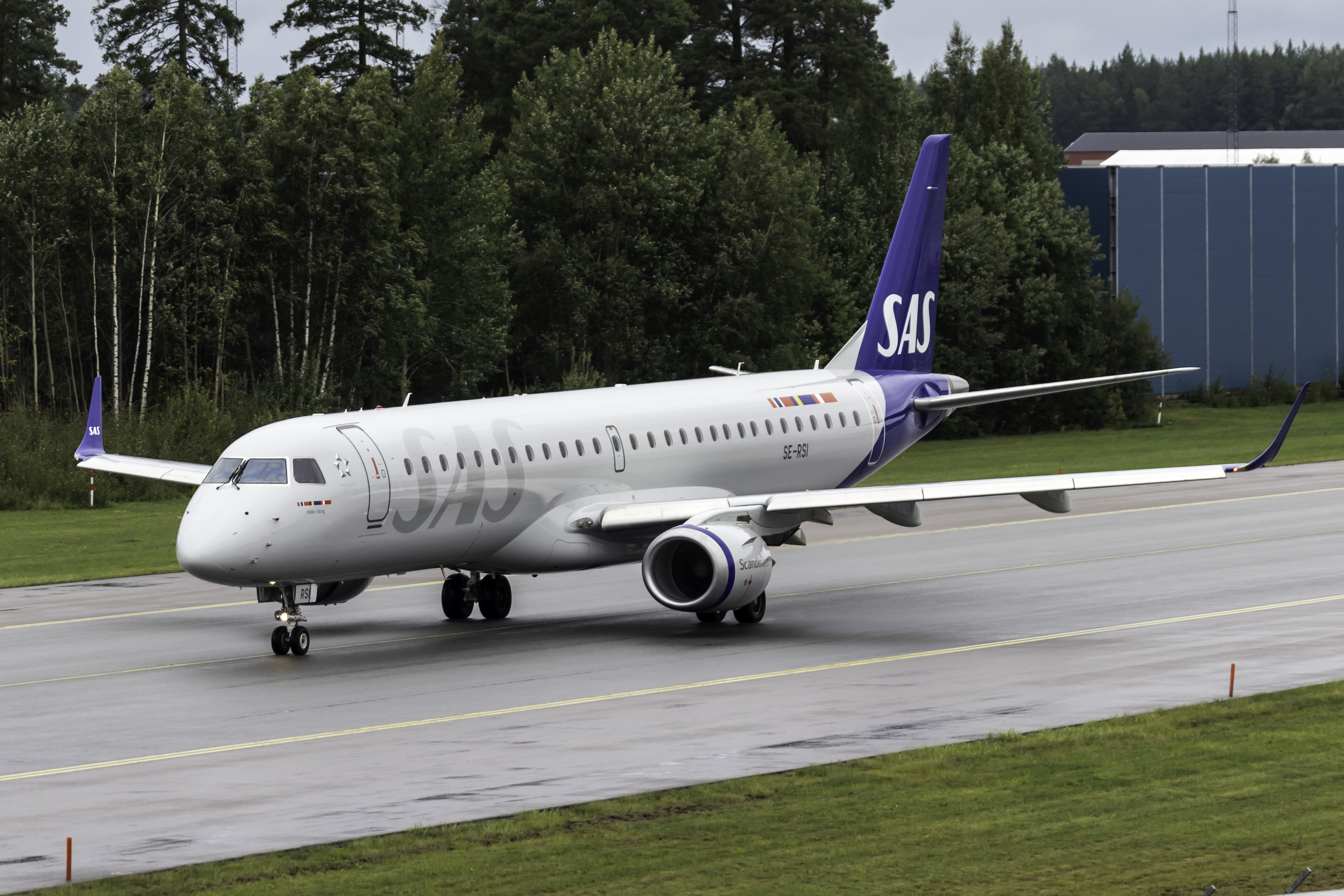
IATA	ICAO	Call sign
SK	SVS	DISCOVER
- Founded: 2021; 5 years ago
- Commenced operations: 10 April 2022; 4 years ago
- AOC #: SE.AOC.0090
- Operating bases: Bergen; Copenhagen; Oslo
- Frequent-flyer program: EuroBonus
- Alliance: SkyTeam (affiliate)
- Fleet size: 16
- Parent company: SAS Group
- Headquarters: Solna, Stockholm. Sweden
- Website: www.flysas.com

SAS Link is a regional airline subsidiary of Scandinavian Airlines, both owned by the SAS Group.

== History ==
The airline was founded in 2021 and started operations in 2022. The airline is operating from Copenhagen Airport, Oslo Airport and Bergen Airport.

The entire aircraft fleet is registered in Sweden.

== Fleet ==
As of August 2025, SAS Link operates the following aircraft:

Aircraft	In service	Orders	Passengers	Notes
Embraer E195	16	–	122	Operated for Scandinavian Airlines.
Embraer E195-E2	–	45	TBA	Order with 10 options.
Total	16	45		
