= Anko van der Werff =

Dutch lawyer and CEO (born 1975)

- Born: February 1975 (age 51); Paterswolde, The Netherlands
- Education: Leiden University; Harvard Business School
- Title: Designate President and CEO of Air Canada (2027–present)

Anko David van der Werff (born 1975) is a Dutch lawyer and business executive in the airline industry, who is president and CEO of Scandinavian Airlines since 2021.

From 2000 to 2010 van der Werff worked at KLM and later Air France–KLM, from 2000 to 2005 in the Netherlands, from 2005 to 2009 in Sweden (from 2006 to 2009 as regional manager for Sweden, Finland and the Baltics) and from 2009 to 2010 in the United Kingdom as commercial director for UK and Ireland. From 2010 to 2014 he worked at Qatar Airways and for 2014 to 2019 at Aeroméxico as executive vice president and chief commercial officer.

From 2019 to 2021 van der Werff was the president and CEO of Avianca Group. At Avianca, he was succeeded by Adrian Neuhauser.

In July 2021 van der Werff succeeded Rickard Gustafson as president and CEO of SAS AB.

In January 2027 van der Werff will succeed Michael Rousseau as president and CEO of Air Canada.
