= SAS Group =

Airline holding company based in Sweden

SAS AB
- Type: Private; State-owned enterprise (Partly)
- ISIN: SE0003366871
- Industry: Aviation
- Founded: 1946; 80 years ago, merger of ABA (1924), DDL (1918), and DNL (1927)
- Headquarters: Solna, Stockholm County, Sweden
- Area served: Europe
- Key people: Carsten Dilling (Chairman); Anko van der Werff (CEO)
- Services: Airline services
- Revenue: ▲45.83 billion kr (2024)
- Operating income: ▲ −2.11 billion kr (2024)
- Net income: ▲1.57 billion kr (2024)
- Total assets: ▲56.35 billion kr (2024)
- Total equity: ▼6.42 billion kr (2021)
- Owner: Castlelake, L.P. (32%); Danish Ministry of Finance (25.8%); Air France–KLM (19.9%); Lind Invest (8.6%)
- Number of employees: 8,591 (2025)
- Subsidiaries: Scandinavian Airlines; SAS Connect; SAS Link; SAS Cargo Group; SAS Technical Services; SAS Ground Handling
- Website: www.sasgroup.net

SAS AB, trading as SAS Group, is a Swedish-based airline holding company headquartered in Solna Municipality, Sweden. It is the owner of the airlines Scandinavian Airlines, SAS Link, and SAS Connect.

As of 2024, SAS Group is owned by a group of shareholders including the American investment fund Castlelake, L.P. (in turn controlled by Brookfield Asset Management) with a 32% stake, the Government of Denmark (through the Ministry of Finance) with a 25.8% stake, Air France-KLM with a 19.9% stake and the Danish family office Lind Invest with a 8.6% stake. This ownership structure emerged after the company exited U.S. Chapter 11 bankruptcy in August 2024, a process initiated in July 2022 due to the group's financial difficulties.

SAS was formed as a consortium in 1951, as a merger between the three Scandinavian flag carriers Aerotransport (ABA - Sweden), Det Danske Luftfartselskab (DDL - Denmark), and Det Norske Luftfartselskap (DNL - Norway), after the three had been cooperating on international routes since 1946.

Until 2001, the three national companies owned a fixed share of the SAS Group, after which the shares of the three companies were merged into SAS AB. Norway sold its final 9.88% stake in June 2018, marking the end of its involvement in SAS after being a part-owner since 1946. The Swedish government maintained a 21.8% stake until the 2024 restructuring.

SAS Group previously owned various entities, including Rezidor Hotel Group (owner of the Radisson SAS brand) and Braathens. It also had a minority interest in bmi, airBaltic, Texas Air Corporation, Thai Airways International, and LAN Airlines. SAS also once owned 19.9% of the now defunct Spanish airline Spanair as well as shares in Estonian Air and Skyways Express.

SAS was a founder of the Amadeus Computerised Reservation System and the Star Alliance, which it left on 31 August 2024. SAS runs the frequent flyer program EuroBonus.

== History ==
The airline was founded on 1 August 1946 when Det Danske Luftfartselskab A/S, AB Aerotransport, and Det Norske Luftfartselskap AS (the flag carriers of Denmark, Sweden, and Norway) formed a partnership to handle intercontinental traffic to Scandinavia. Operations started on 17 September 1946. The companies then started coordination of European operations in 1948 and finally merged to form the current SAS Consortium in 1951. When established, the airline was divided between SAS Danmark (28.6%), SAS Norge (28.6%), and SAS Sweden (42.8%), all owned 50% by private investors and 50% by their respective governments. SAS gradually acquired control of the domestic markets in all three countries by acquiring full or partial control of several local airlines. In May 1997, SAS formed the global Star Alliance network with Air Canada, Lufthansa, Thai Airways International, and United Airlines.

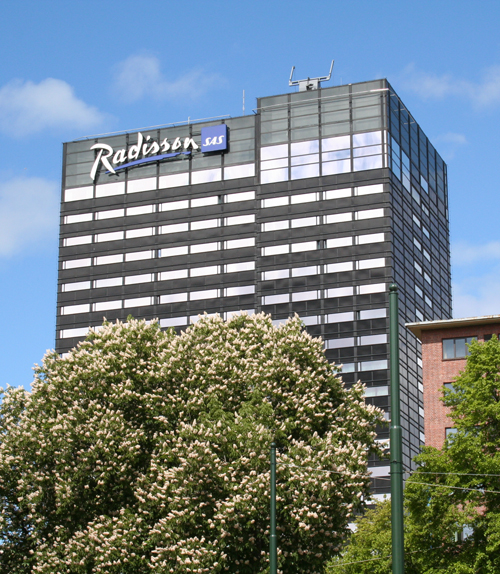
Radisson hotel in Oslo no longer managed by SAS as of 2009 (Picture from May 2005)

== History of SAS Group ==
=== Predecessors and unification ===
The SAS Group has its origins in 1918 with the founding of AB Aerotransport (ABA), the Swedish parent company of SAS. In 1920, Det Danske Luftfartselskab A/S (DDL), the Danish parent company, was established. DDL was listed on the Copenhagen Stock Exchange in 1924. In 1927, Det Norske Luftfartselskap A/S (DNL), the Norwegian parent company, was founded.

In 1946, SAS was formed from Det Danske Luftfartselskab A/S (DDL), Det Norske Luftfartselskap A/S (DNL), and Svensk Interkontinental Lufttrafik AB (SILA). The first intercontinental flight was from Stockholm Arlanda to New York. In 1951, DDL, DNL, and ABA formed the present SAS Consortium.

=== Early years ===
In 1954, SAS became the first airline to fly the Copenhagen - Los Angeles polar route in regular scheduled service. In 1957, SAS was the first airline to offer "round the world service over the North Pole" from Copenhagen to Tokyo via Anchorage. The airline entered the jet age in 1959 with the introduction of the Caravelle aircraft. In 1960, SAS opened its first hotel, the SAS Royal Hotel Copenhagen, and helped establish Thai Airways International, taking a 30% share in the joint venture. In 1965, SAS was the first airline to introduce an electronic reservation system.

In 1967, DNL was listed on the Oslo Stock Exchange. In 1971, SAS put its first Boeing 747 jumbo jet into service. In 1977, SAS sold its remaining stakes in Thai Airways. In 1980, SAS opened its first hotel outside of Scandinavia, the SAS Kuwait Hotel. SILA was listed on the Stockholm Stock Exchange. In 1981, SAS EuroClass was introduced on all European routes. The following year, SAS was named the most punctual airline in Europe for the first time. In 1984, SAS received the Air Transport World's distinction "Airline of the Year" for 1983.

=== Expansion and refocusing ===
In 1986, Spanair was founded by SAS Group. In 1987, SAS cofounded the Amadeus Computerised Reservation System (also known as GDS). In 1989, SAS International Hotels owned 40% of Intercontinental Hotels Group, a stake that was sold in 1992.

In 1994, SAS began to refocus on airline operations in the SAS Group, selling a number of subsidiaries along with the franchise of Diners Club Nordic. The company celebrated its 50th anniversary on 1 August 1996, and the SAS parent company changed its name to SAS Danmark A/S, SAS Norge ASA, and SAS Sverige AB.

In 1997, SAS became one of the founding members of Star Alliance. In 1998, Air Botnia (Blue1) became a wholly owned subsidiary of the SAS Group. In 1999, the SAS Group became a majority owner of Widerøe.

=== 21st century ===
In 2001, a single SAS share was established, as SAS AB. On July 6, SAS was listed on the stock exchanges in Stockholm, Copenhagen, and Oslo. In December, Braathens was acquired by the SAS Group. In 2002, Rezidor SAS Hospitality signed a master franchise agreement with Carlson Hotels Worldwide; the agreement came to an end in 2009. In 2003, SAS acquired 49% of the shares in Estonian Air.

In 2004, Scandinavian Airlines Sverige, SAS Braathens, and Scandinavian Airlines Danmark were incorporated. In 2006, SAS sold its remaining shares in the Rezidor Hotel Group chain. In 2007, CEO and President Mats Jansson was inaugurated; SAS sold the SAS Flight Academy.

In 2010, CEO Jansson departed his position and was replaced by John S. Dueholm on an interim basis. Rickard Gustafson became the new permanent CEO in 2011. In January 2012, Spanair collapsed, leading to write-downs of 1.7 billion kronor by SAS. In 2013, SAS sold 80% of the shares in Widerøe.

In 2014, SAS sold the cleaning part of SAS Ground Handling to Sodexo. In 2015, SAS sold SAS Ground Handling in 14 airports in Norway to Widerøe Ground Handling and sold Blue1 to CityJet. In November 2015, Estonian Air collapsed, resulting in SAS losing 2.5% of the shares. In 2016, SAS sold its remaining 20% stake in Widerøe.

Norway's government sold its final 9.88% stake in SAS Group in June 2018.

=== Impact of COVID-19 and restructuring ===
In 2020, SAS halted most of its traffic from March 16 due to the COVID-19 pandemic. This decision led to the temporary layoff of 90% of the group's staff as travel demand plummeted globally. In July 2022, SAS filed for Chapter 11 bankruptcy protection in the United States as part of a restructuring effort to address its financial difficulties.

As part of the restructuring plan, SAS secured new investments and underwent significant ownership changes. US investment firm Castlelake acquired a 32% stake in the reorganised airline, while Air France-KLM obtained around 20%. The Danish state obtained a 26% share, and Danish investor Lind Invest acquired 8.6%. The remaining equity was expected to be distributed among SAS's creditors.

The restructuring also involved delisting SAS from the Stockholm, Copenhagen, and Oslo stock exchanges, resulting in the existing shares' value being reduced to zero. This decision affected over 250,000 shareholders, many of whom were retail investors, and led to a 95% drop in the stock's value.

The restructuring marked the end of Wallenberg family's involvement in SAS. A prominent Swedish business dynasty, the Wallenbergs had had involvement in SAS since 1946, and through their investment company, FAM AB had been a major stakeholder in SAS. Their stake was effectively wiped out during the restructuring process.

Air France-KLM, which became a significant shareholder, indicated plans to integrate SAS flights into its existing network at its hubs in Amsterdam and Paris. This was part of Air France-KLM's broader goal to expand its operations in the Nordic region. A condition of the deal is that Air France-KLM could also expand its stake in SAS after at least two years to become a controlling shareholder.

On 4 July 2025, Air France-KLM announced its intention to increase its stake in SAS’s share capital from 19.9% to 60.5%, taking over Castlelake and Lind Invest's stakes in the company. Pending approval from competition authorities, Air France-KLM expect SAS to become a subsidiary in Air France-KLM Group, where the Danish Ministry of Finance will retain its minority stake of approximately 26% in the subsidiary. This move was not unexpected as already in 2023, Air France-KLM announced the ambition to become a controlling stakeholder after a minimum of 2 years.

== Operations ==
SAS Group is the main operational company in the SAS consortium. The SAS Group company structure looks as follows:

Core SAS Holdings

- Scandinavian Airlines (100%)
- SAS Connect (100%)
- SAS Link (100%)
- SAS Cargo Group (100%)
- SAS Ground Handling (100%)
- SAS Technical Services (100%)

=== Head office ===
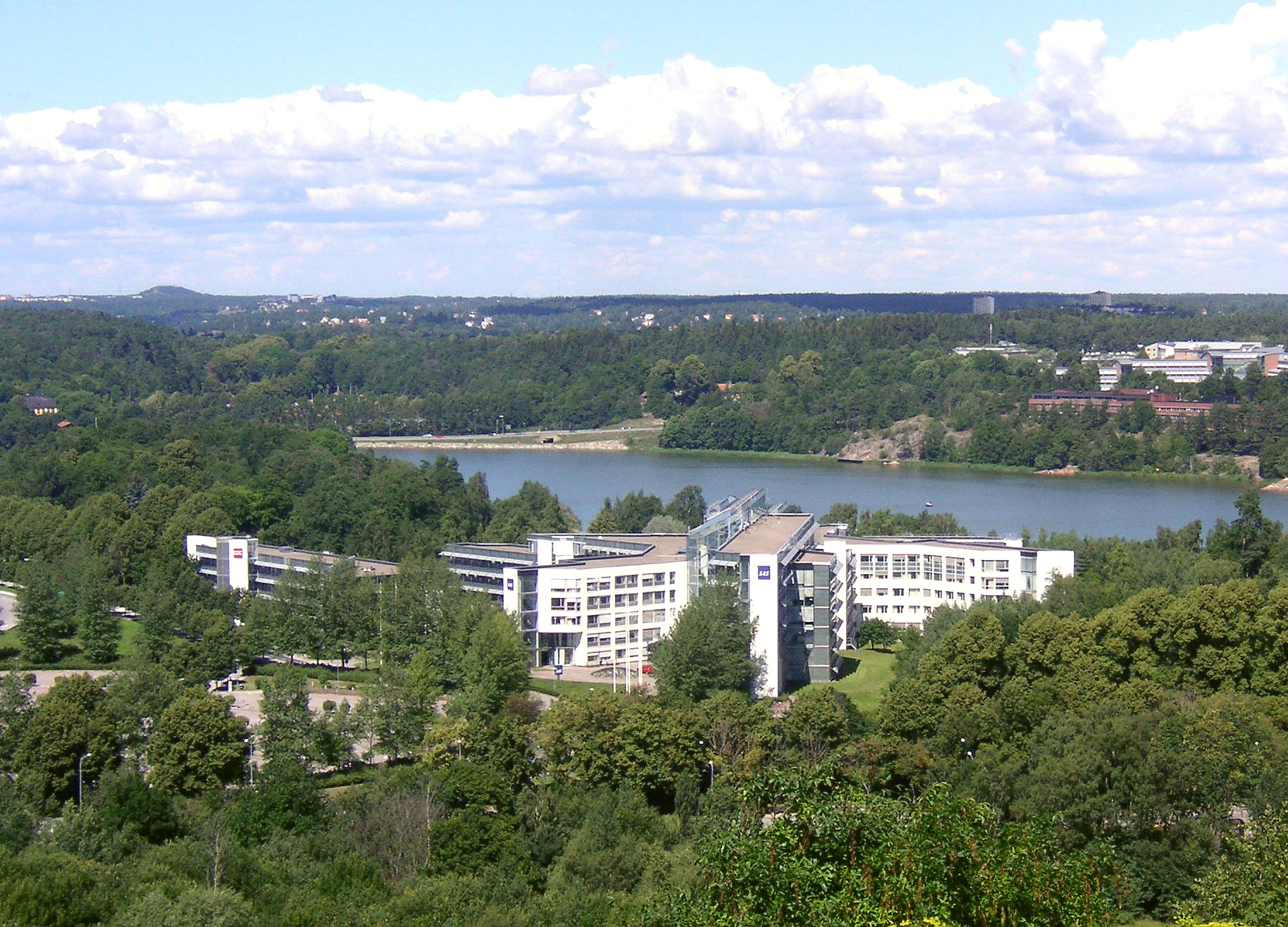
SAS Frösundavik Office Building

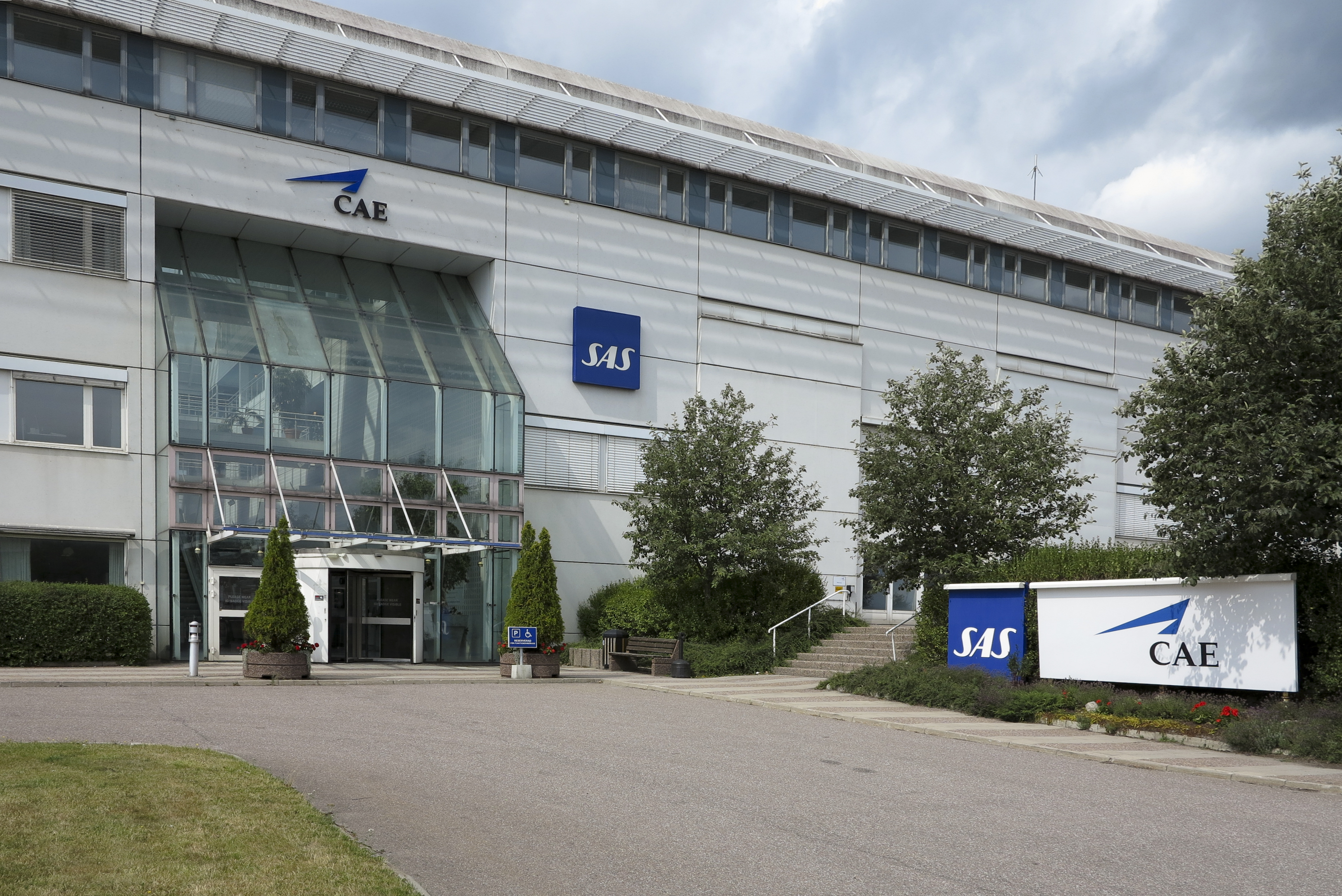
Former Scandinavian Airlines head office at Arlanda Airport

The SAS Group head office is currently in the SAS Frösundavik Office Building in Frösundavik, Solna Municipality, Sweden, in the Stockholm area.

The SAS Group head office was previously located on the grounds of the Stockholm Arlanda Airport (ARN) in Sigtuna Municipality, Sweden.

Before spring 2011, it was located in the SAS Frösundavik Office Building.

== Partners and alliances ==
- Air Greenland has an interline agreement with SAS.
- Scandinavian Airlines is a member of the SkyTeam alliance. A co-founding member of the Star Alliance, it was a member from 1997 to 2024.
- SAS Cargo Group was a member of the WOW Alliance.

== List of shareholders ==
Shareholder	Type of shareholder	Nationality	Ownership
Castlelake	Investment fund	United States	32%
Ministry of Finance (Denmark)	Government	Denmark	25.8%
Air France–KLM	Airline Group	France; Netherlands	19.9%
Lind Invest	Family office	Denmark	8.6%
Others (to be distributed)			

=== Presidents ===
- 1946–1948: Per Norlin
- 1949–1951: Per Møystad Backe
- 1951–1954: Per Norlin
- 1955–1957: Henning Throne-Holst
- 1958–1961: Åke Rusck
- 1961–1962: Curt Nicolin
- 1962–1969: Karl Nilsson
- 1969–1978: Knut Hagrup
- 1978–1981: Carl-Olov Munkberg
- 1981–1993: Jan Carlzon
- 1993–1994: Jan Reinås
- 1994–2001: Jan Stenberg
- 2001–2006: Jørgen Lindegaard
- 2007–2010: Mats Jansson
- 2010–2011: John S Dueholm
- 2011–2021: Rickard Gustafson
- 2021: Anko van der Werff

== Financial performance ==
Year ended	Passengers flown	Employees (Average/Year)	Net profit/loss (SEK)	Basic eps (SEK)
2024	25,200,000	10,357		
2023	23,700,000	9,455		
2010	▲25,200,000	▼14,801	▲-2,218,000,000	▲-7.79
2009	▼24,900,000	▼18,786	▲-2,947,000,000	▼-18.20
2008	29,000,000	24,635	-6,360,000,000	-6.29
2007	29,200,000	26,538	1,234,000,000	3.87
2006	38,609,000	26,554	4,936,000,000	28.10
2005	36,312,000	32,363	418,000,000	1.06
2004	32,400,000	32,481	-1,813,000,000	-11.38
2003	31,004,000	34,544	-2,221,000,000	-8.60
2002	33,254,000	35,506	-736,000,000	-0.81
2001	35,640,000	31,035	-1,140,000,000	-6.58
2000*	23,240,000	30,939	2,273,000,000	11.79
1999*	21,991,000	30,310	1,846,000,000	8.41

- Prior to 2001, the SAS Group traffic figures did not include airBaltic, Blue1, and Spanair.

== Fleet ==
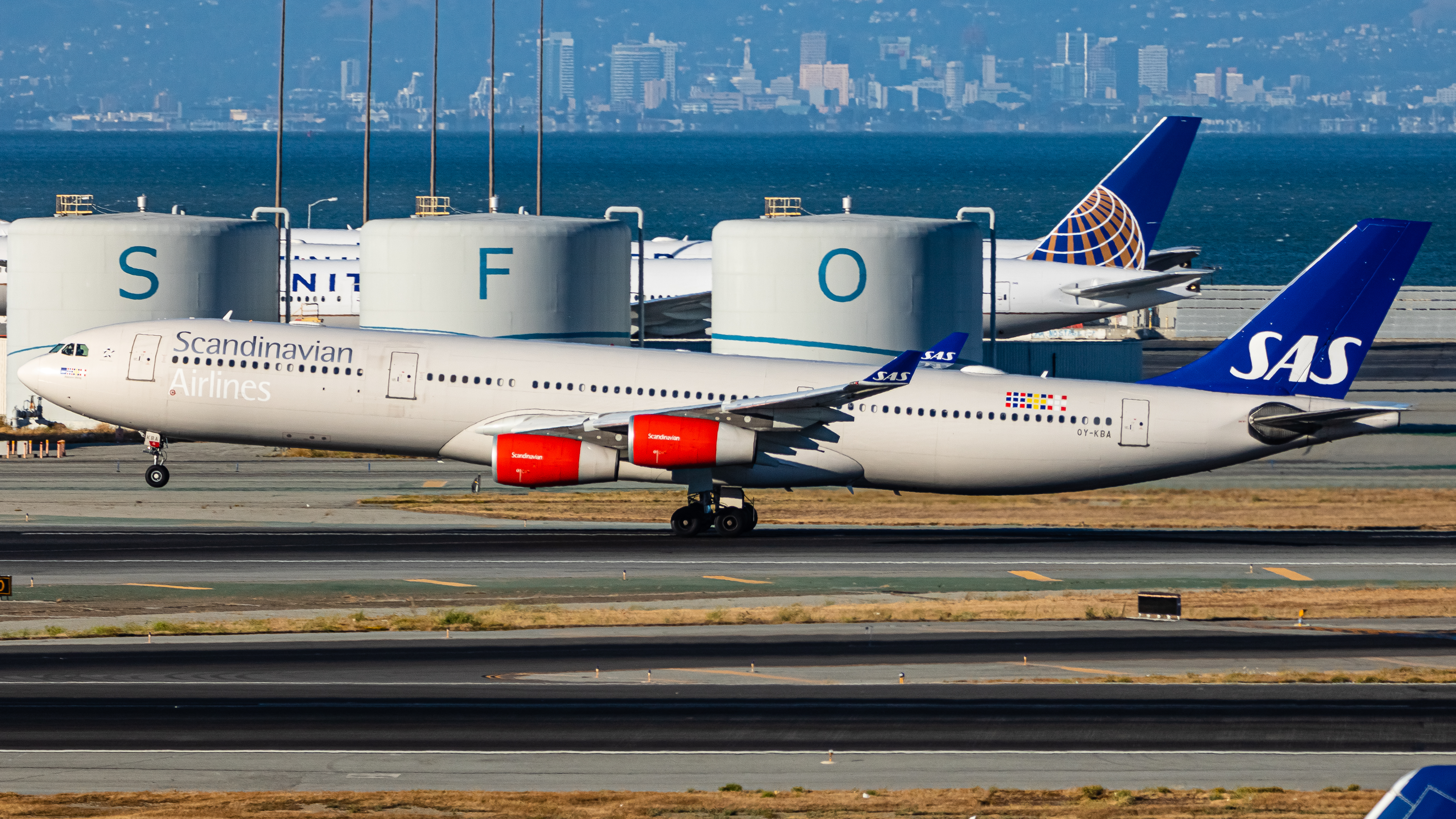
Airbus A340 taking off at San Francisco International Airport

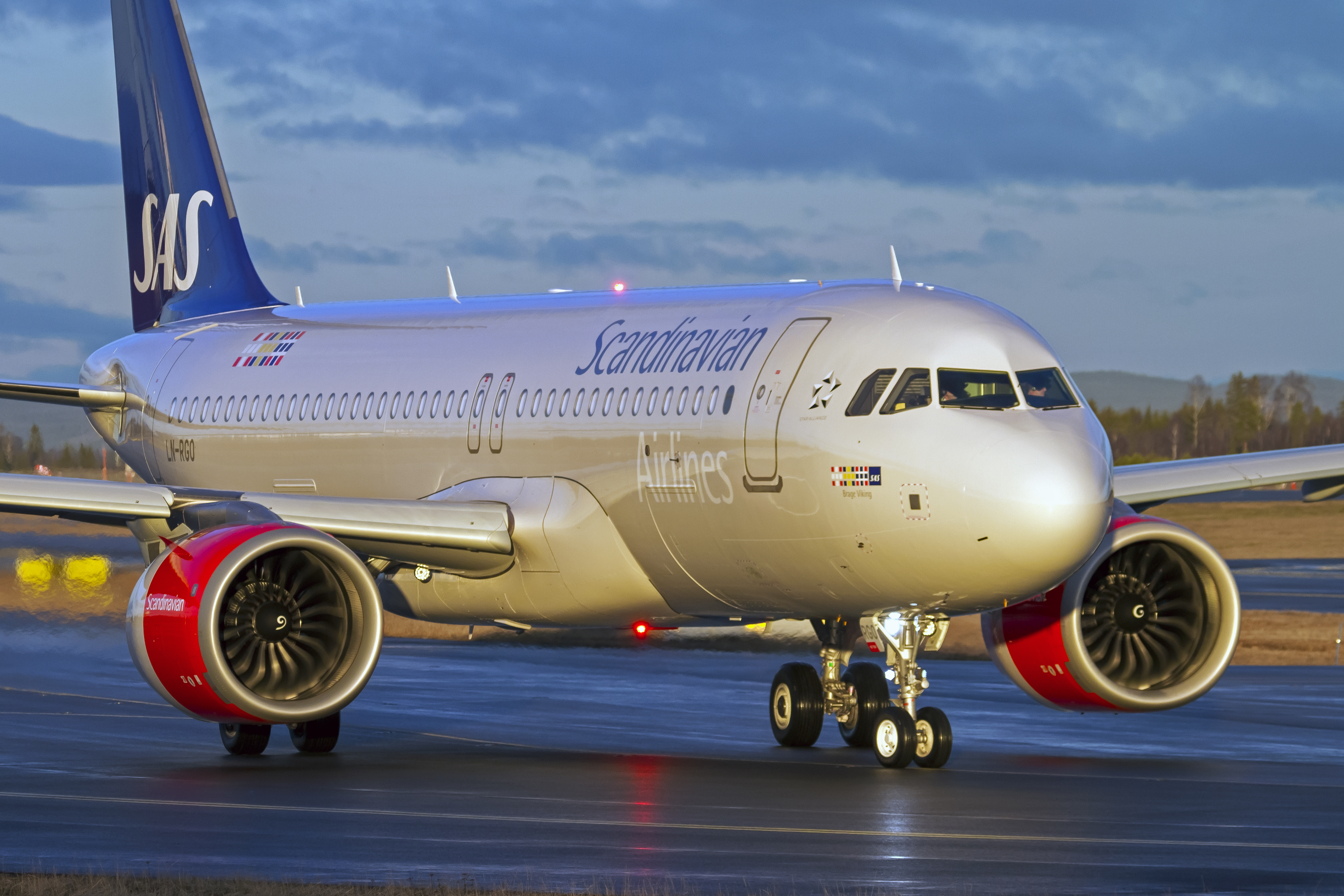
Airbus A320neo in 2017

The SAS Group fleet consists of the following aircraft as of November 2023:

Type	SAS	On order	Notes
Airbus A319-100	4		OY-KBO in retro livery
Airbus A320-200	11		
Airbus A320neo	61	19	25 wet leased to SAS Connect
Airbus A321LR	3		
ATR 72-600	7		Operated by Nordica
Airbus A330-300	8	22	
Airbus A330-900		18	
Airbus A350-900 XWB	6		
Bombardier CRJ900	11		Operated by CityJet
Bombardier CRJ900	6		Operated by Nordica
Embraer 195	10		Operated by SAS Link
Total	124	59	

On 4 January 2010, the SAS Group announced the sales of 18 surplus MD-80 series aircraft to Allegiant Travel Company. The aircraft, built from 1985 to 1991, were delivered during the first half of 2010.

On 26 August 2010, the SAS Group announced a 5-year lease agreement of 8 MD-90 series aircraft to an undisclosed US airline. The aircraft will be delivered between Q3-2010 and Q2-2011.

On 10 April 2018, the SAS Group announced a deal with Airbus for 35 new Airbus A320neos with another 15 being leased. These aircraft are meant to replace some of SAS's current A320s, as well as their Bombardier CRJ900s, bringing the total of the type to 80 aircraft.

On 30 June 2026, the SAS Group announced an agreement with Airbus to acquire up to 40 new widebody aircraft, including 18 A330-900 jets.

== SAS Museum ==
The exhibits at the SAS Museum at Oslo Airport, Gardermoen, in Norway, represent an important part of Scandinavian civil aviation history. The museum collections cover Scandinavian Airlines System (SAS) as well as its parent companies: AB Aerotransport (ABA), Det Danske Luftfartselskab (DDL), and Det Norske Luftfartselskap (DNL). A museum was originally established in 1989 in the hangar area at Oslo Airport, Fornebu at the same time as the formation of the DNL/SAS Historic Society. It was built up through the efforts of a group of enthusiasts among retired and active SAS employees. The establishment of the new museum in 2003-2004 is a result of SAS feeling a responsibility to document the history of Scandinavian civil aviation. For this purpose, the airline has entered a partnership with its three national historic societies and the latter undertake the day-to-day work on a volunteer basis. SAS absorbs the rental cost of the museum building and has also provided depots for museum exhibits in Denmark and Sweden. The museum at Oslo's Gardermoen is therefore more than just a continuation of the facility at Fornebu – it is a completely new and considerably expanded Scandinavian museum. It is run by a board that includes representatives of the SAS consortium and the Swedish, Danish, and Norwegian historic societies.

== See also ==
- SAS Media
