= Scandinavian Airlines =

Flag carrier airline of Denmark, Norway, and Sweden

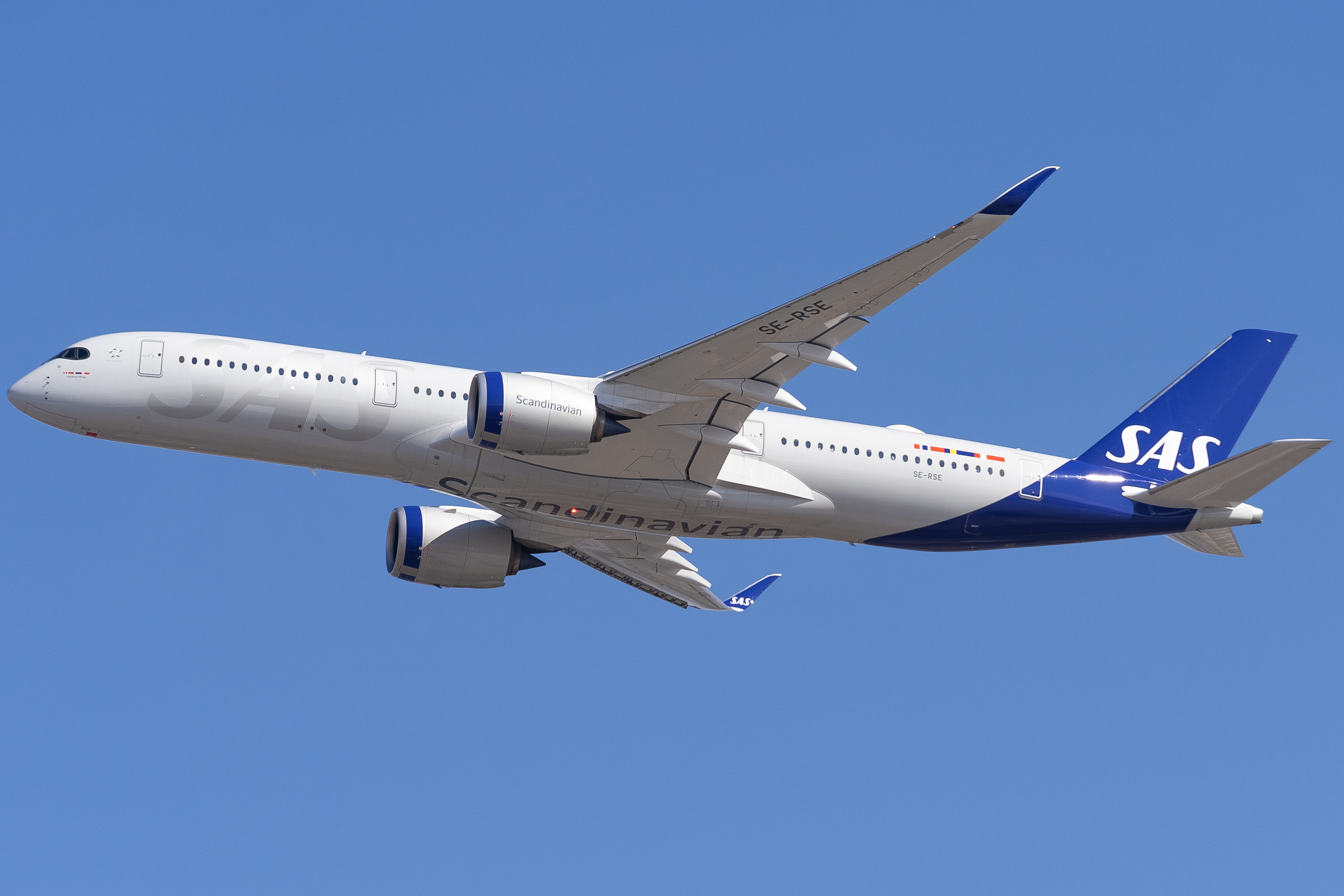
- Scandinavian Airlines Airbus A350-900
IATA	ICAO	Call sign
SK	SAS	SCANDINAVIAN
- Founded: 1 August 1946; 80 years ago
- Commenced operations: 17 September 1946; 80 years ago
- AOC #: SCA.AOC.001E
- Hubs: Copenhagen; Oslo; Stockholm–Arlanda
- Focus cities: Bergen; Gothenburg; Stavanger; Tromsø; Trondheim
- Frequent-flyer program: EuroBonus
- Alliance: SkyTeam
- Subsidiaries: SAS Connect; SAS Link
- Fleet size: 135 (including subsidiaries and leases)
- Destinations: 156 (including subsidiaries)
- Parent company: SAS Group
- Headquarters: Solna, Stockholm County, Sweden
- Key people: Carsten Dilling (chairman); Anko van der Werff (CEO)
- Revenue: SEK 45,883 million (2024)
- Profit: SEK 1,579 million (2024)
- Website: www.flysas.com

The Scandinavian Airlines System (SAS), (Note: Full name "Scandinavian Airlines System Denmark–Norway–Sweden".) commonly known as Scandinavian Airlines, is the joint flag carrier airline of Denmark, Norway, and Sweden. It is part of SAS Group and is headquartered in Solna, Sweden.

Operating a wide European and intercontinental network, the airline's principal hub is Copenhagen Airport, supported by two other major hubs at Stockholm Arlanda Airport and Oslo Airport. Including its subsidiaries SAS Link and SAS Connect, operates a fleet of over 130 aircraft to over 150 destinations. As of 2024, SAS serves approximately 25 million passengers annually, making it the largest airline in Denmark and Sweden and one of the largest in Europe.

The airline was founded in 1946 as a consortium to pool the transatlantic operations of the Swedish, Norwegian, and Danish national airlines, which were fully merged in 1951. Long considered an icon of Scandinavian cooperation, SAS was one of the five founding members of Star Alliance in 1997.

In October 2023, as part of Chapter 11 bankruptcy restructuring, SAS Group underwent a major change in ownership. A consortium including Air France–KLM and the Government of Denmark acquired stakes in the airline. As a result of this transition, SAS departed Star Alliance and joined SkyTeam alliance in September 2024. In July 2025, the Franco-Dutch airline group announced an agreement to increase its holding to 60.5%.

== History ==
The airline's original emblem, displaying each Scandinavian flag as coats of arms, with surmounting crowns

=== Founding ===
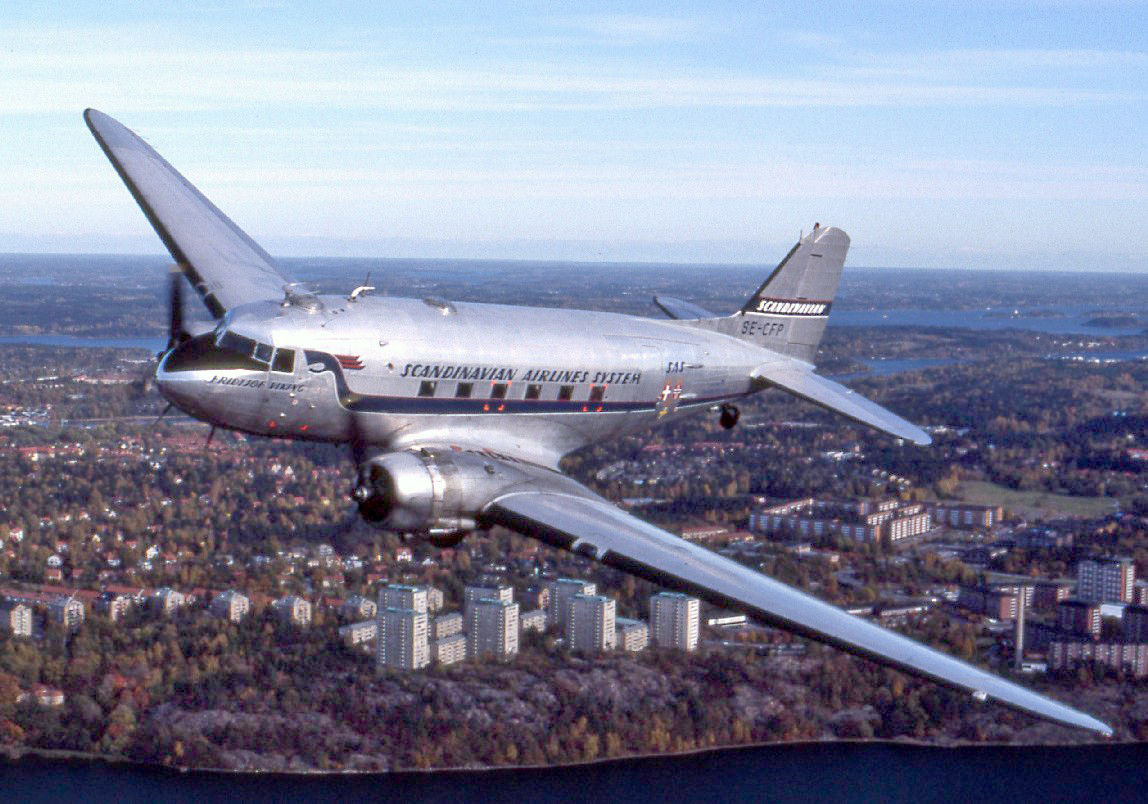
A privately preserved Douglas DC-3 wearing SAS' late 1940s-style markings

The airline was founded on 1 August 1946, when Svensk Interkontinental Lufttrafik AB (an airline owned by the Swedish Wallenberg family), Det Danske Luftfartselskab A/S, and Det Norske Luftfartselskap AS (the flag carriers of Denmark and Norway) formed a partnership to handle the combined air traffic of the three Scandinavian countries. The first president of SAS was Per Norlin. On 17 September 1946, operations started under the new entity and the first international service was conducted between Stockholm and New York. Within a half-year, SAS set a new record for carrying the heaviest single piece of air cargo across the Atlantic on a scheduled passenger airliner, by shipping a 1,400-pound electrical panel from New York to the Sandvik company in Sweden.

In 1948, the Swedish flag carrier AB Aerotransport joined SAS and quickly coordinated its European operations between both carriers. Three years later, the companies formally merged to form the SAS Consortium. When established, ownership of the airline was divided between SAS Danmark (28.6%), SAS Norge (28.6%), and SAS Sverige (42.8%), all of which were owned 50% by private investors and 50% by their governments.

=== Transpolar route ===
During 1954, SAS became the first airline to commence scheduled flights on a polar route, flying Douglas DC-6Bs from Copenhagen to Los Angeles with stops in Søndre Strømfjord (now Kangerlussuaq) in Greenland and Winnipeg in Canada, pioneering a commercial route that marked a milestone in transpolar aviation history. By the summer of 1956, traffic on the route had justified the frequency to be increased to three flights per week. The service proved relatively popular with Hollywood celebrities and members of the film industry, and the route turned out to be a publicity coup for SAS. Thanks to a tariff structure that allowed free transit to other European destinations via Copenhagen, this trans-polar route gained increasing popularity with American tourists throughout the 1950s.

In 1957, SAS was the first airline to offer around-the-world service over the North Pole via a second polar route served by Douglas DC-7Cs flying from Copenhagen to Tokyo via Anchorage International Airport in Alaska. The flight via Alaska was a compromise solution since the Soviet Union would not allow SAS, among other air carriers, to fly across Siberia between Europe and Japan, and Chinese airspace was also closed.

=== Jet era ===
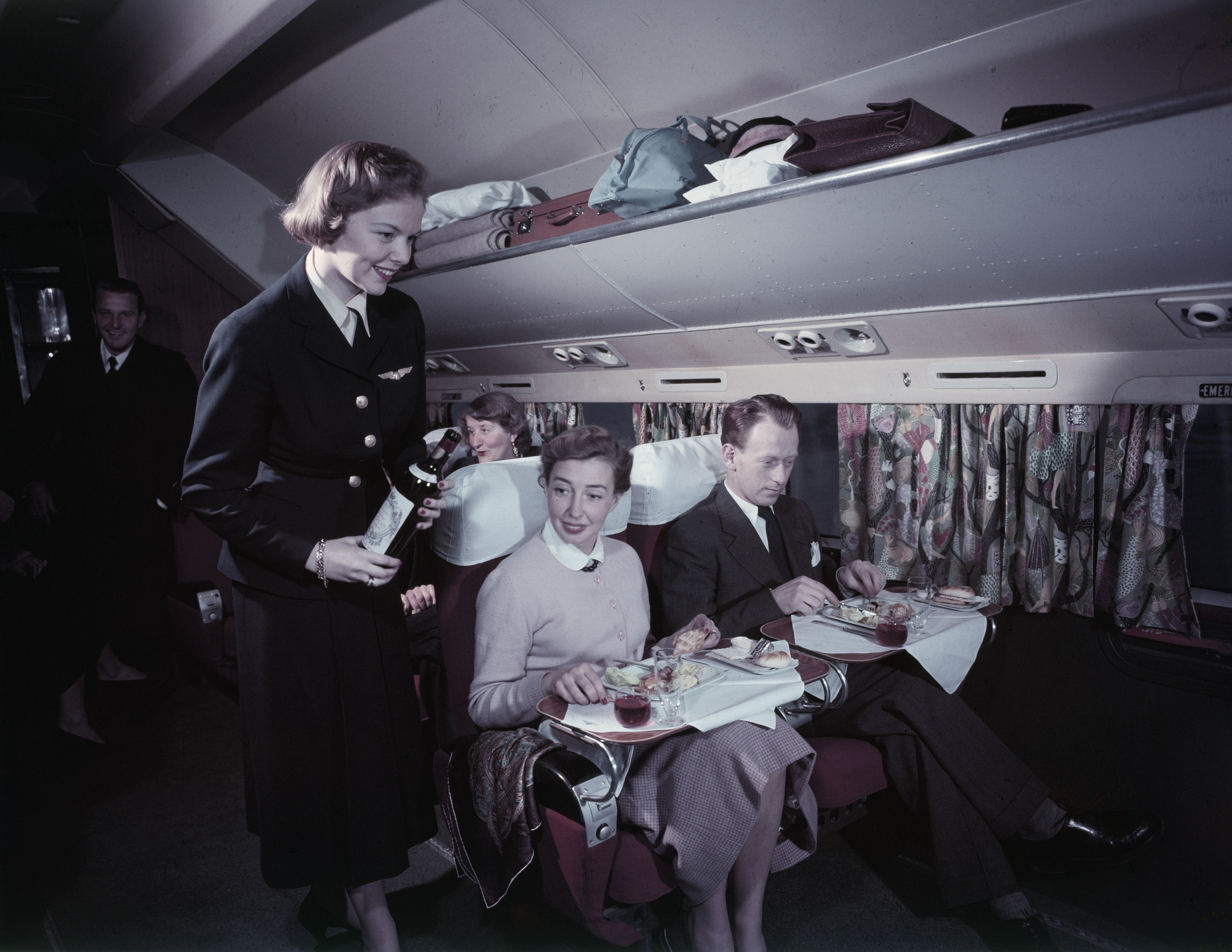
A Scandinavian Airlines flight attendant serving passengers in the 1960s

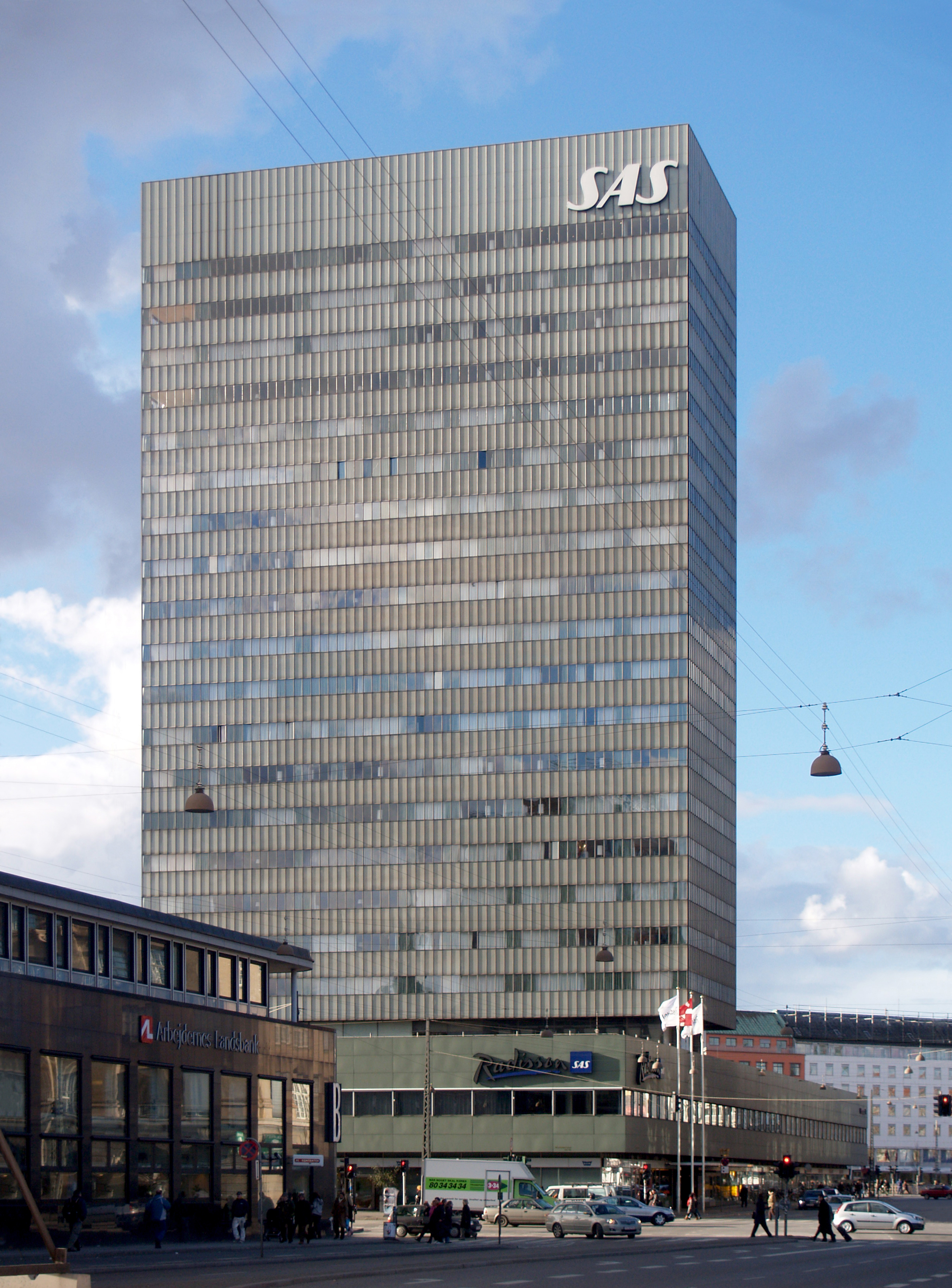
Radisson Blu Royal Hotel in central Copenhagen, originally SAS Royal Hotel, designed by Arne Jacobsen and built in 1960

In 1959, SAS entered the jet age, having procured a number of French-built Sud Aviation Caravelles as the company's first jetliner.

In addition to modern airliners, SAS also adopted innovative operating practices and systems to improve the customer experience. In 1965, it was the first airline to introduce an electronic reservation system. During 1971, SAS introduced its first Boeing 747 jumbo jet into service. Prior to the delivery of its first 747s, SAS had formed the KSS maintenance consortium with KLM and Swissair in 1969 to provide a maintenance pool and standardize aircraft specifications for the three airlines' 747 fleets. The consortium later incorporated UTA and was renamed into KSSU to jointly acquire and maintain McDonnell Douglas DC-10 widebody trijets. In 1982, SAS was recognised as the most punctual airline operating in Europe at that time.

During its first decades, the airline built two large hotels in central Copenhagen, SAS Royal Hotel (5 stars) and the even larger SAS Hotel Scandinavia (4 stars, with a casino on the 26th floor). In 1980, SAS opened its first hotel outside of Scandinavia, the SAS Kuwait Hotel. By 1989, SAS's hotel division owned a 40 percent share in the Intercontinental Hotels Group. Following the deregulation of commercial aviation in Europe and the competitive pressures from new rivals, SAS experienced economic difficulties (as did many incumbent flag carrier airlines) this heavily contributed to the airline's decision to sell its hotel chain to the Radisson Hotel Group during 1992.

The company logo in the 1980s was made up of stripes in the colors of the flags of Denmark, Norway, and Sweden.

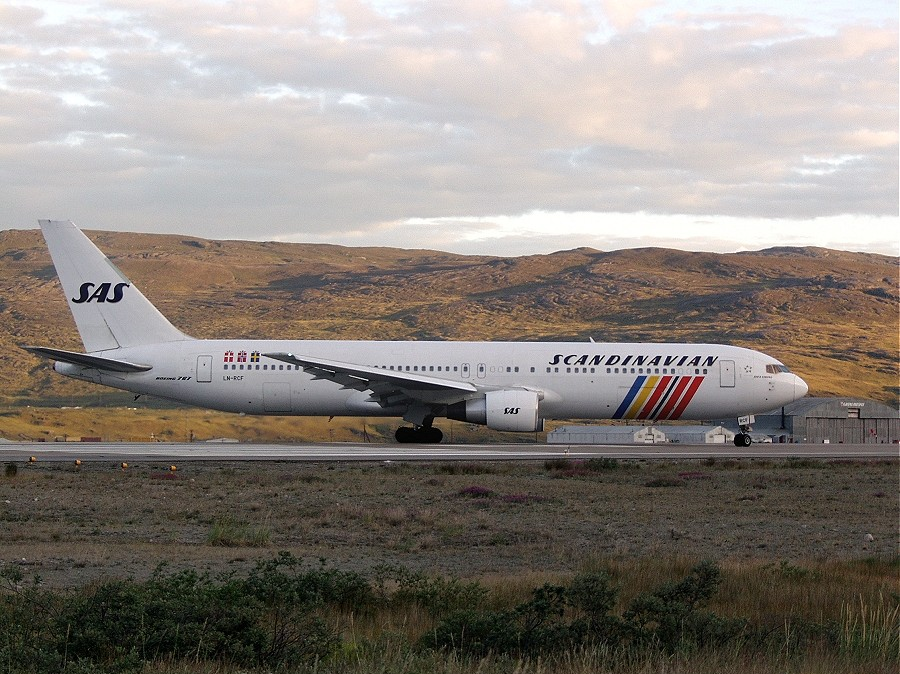
SAS operated flights to Greenland for more than 50 years until March 2003. The route reopened in spring 2007 until January 2009. Pictured: a Boeing 767-300ER at Kangerlussuaq Airport (2001).

=== Consolidation, acquisitions, and partnerships ===
During the early 1990s, SAS unsuccessfully tried to merge itself with KLM, along with Austrian Airlines and Swissair, in a proposed combined entity commonly called Alcazar. However, months of negotiations towards this ambitious merger ultimately collapsed due to multiple unsettled issues; this strategic failure heavily contributed to the departure of Carlzon that same year and his replacement by Jan Reinås. The airline marked its 50th year of operation on 1 August 1996 with the harmonization and name of SAS's parent company to SAS Danmark A/S, SAS Norge ASA and SAS Sverige AB. During May 1997, SAS became a founding member of the global Star Alliance network, joining with airlines such as Air Canada, Lufthansa, Thai Airways International, and United Airlines.

In June 2001, the ownership structure of SAS was changed, with a holding company being created in which the holdings of the governments changed to Sweden (21.4%), Norway (14.3%), and Denmark (14.3%), while the remaining 50 percent of shares were publicly held and traded on the regulated share market. During 2004, SAS was again restructured, being divided into four separate companies: SAS Scandinavian Airlines Sverige AB, SAS Scandinavian Airlines Danmark A/S, SAS Braathens AS, and SAS Scandinavian International AS. SAS Braathens was re-branded SAS Scandinavian Airlines Norge AS in 2007.

=== 2009–2021: Restructuring ===
With the growth of budget airlines and decreasing fares in Scandinavia, the business experienced financial hardship. By 2009, competitive pressures had compelled the airline to launch a cost-cutting initiative. In the first step of which, the business sold its stakes in other companies, such as British Midland International, Spanair, and airBaltic, and began to restructure its operations. During January 2009, an agreement to divest more than 80 percent of the holdings in Spanair was signed with a Catalan group of investors led by Consorci de Turisme de Barcelona and Catalana d'Inciatives. These changes reportedly reduced the airliner's expenses by around 23 per cent between 2008 and 2011.

In November 2012, the company came under heavy pressure from its owners and banks to implement even heavier cost-cutting measures as a condition for continued financial support. Negotiations with the respective trade unions took place for more than a week and exceeded the original deadline; in the end, an agreement was reached between SAS and the trade unions that would increase the work time, cutting employee's salaries by between 12 and 20 percent, along with reductions to the pension and retirement plans; these measures were aimed at keeping the airline as an operating concern. SAS was criticized for how it handled the negotiations, having reportedly denied facilities to the union delegations.

During 2017, SAS announced that it was forming a new airline, Scandinavian Airlines Ireland, operating out of Heathrow Airport and Málaga Airport to fly European routes on its parent's behalf using nine Airbus A320neos. SAS sought to replace its own aircraft with cheaper ones crewed and based outside Scandinavia to compete better with other airlines. The Swedish Pilots Union expressed its dissatisfaction with the operational structure of the new airline, suggesting it violated the current labour-agreements. The Swedish Cabin Crew Union also condemned the new venture and stated that SAS established the airline to "not pay decent salaries" to cabin crew.

In 2018, SAS announced that it had placed an order for 50 Airbus A320neo narrow-body jetliners to facilitate the creation of a single-type fleet. That same year, in June, the Norwegian government divested its stake in the airline. As part of an environmental initiative launched by San Francisco International Airport (SFO), SAS flights operating out of SFO since December 2018 have been supplied with sustainable aviation fuel from Shell and SkyNRG. On 27 June 2018, the Norwegian government announced that it had sold all its shares in SAS.

In July 2021, the European Commission approved a Swedish and Danish aid measure of approximately US$356 million to support SAS. In September 2021, SAS announced that it would establish two operating subsidiaries; SAS Connect and SAS Link, with its existing SAS Ireland subsidiary to be rebranded as the new SAS Connect, while SAS Link would initially operate the airline's Embraer E195 aircraft, and the operations of both companies to begin by early 2022.

=== 2022–2024: Sweden's exit, Air France-KLM entry and alliance shift ===
Following little progress with SAS's restructuring plan, SAS Forward, the Swedish government announced on 7 June 2022 that Sweden, which owns 21.8% of the company, would not inject new capital into SAS and that it did "not aim to be a long-term shareholder in the company". In early July 2022, nearly 1,000 SAS pilots went on a 15-day strike over wages and cost-cutting measures, severely disrupting operations. A day after the strike began, the airline filed for Chapter 11 bankruptcy protection in the United States on 5 July 2022.

In September 2022, SAS announced it was returning at least ten aircraft to lessors, including five long-haul aircraft - amongst them two barely two year old Airbus A350s. This measure is a result of the closure of Russian airspace for flights to Asia which caused a severe drop in demand and efficiency. As of November 2022, SAS announced it was searching for a buyer for one of their Airbus A350 aircraft.

In October 2023, it was announced that Air France–KLM would be investing alongside the Danish government and two investment firms (Castlelake and Lind Invest) in SAS, with the airline group buying up to 20% of SAS shares following the airline's ongoing Chapter 11 process in the United States. With the investment (if approved by the EU Commission, and respective US and Swedish courts), SAS would leave Star Alliance and join SkyTeam alongside Air France–KLM.

On 19 March 2024, US Bankruptcy Court approved the new restructuring plan and investment, allowing SAS to exit Chapter 11 by mid 2024. It also applied for company reorganization in Sweden on 27 March. SAS announced it would leave Star Alliance by 31 August 2024, becoming a SkyTeam member the next day, as confirmed on 29 April. On 12 June, Stockholm District Court announced that it would hold a hearing for the company reorganization on 12 July, eventually approving it on 19 July. On 28 June, European Commission announced that it approved the restructuring plan.

In September 2024, Scandinavian Airlines announced it would terminate its wet-leasing contract with Xfly by November 2024. On 17 September 2024, SAS announced a partnership with Braathens Regional Airlines (BRA), designating them as a subcontractor to operate flights from Stockholm Arlanda Airport starting in 2025, with BRA announcing it would cease operating its own domestic flight network from Stockholm Bromma Airport. This collaboration, valued at approximately SEK 6 billion over seven years, aims to strengthen SAS's domestic network in Sweden, increasing daily departures to destinations such as Visby, Gothenburg, Malmö, and Luleå.

On 18 September 2024, just a month after the completion of the restructuring, SAS announced expansion of the route network from Copenhagen Airport with 15 new destinations from Summer 2025. Following the new ownership structure, the airline will focus on positioning the airport as the airline's main hub for international travel.

On 4 July 2025, Air France-KLM announced its intention to increase its stake in SAS’s share capital from 19.9% to 60.5%.

== Corporate affairs ==
=== Business trends ===
The key trends for Scandinavian Airlines Group (which includes SAS Cargo, SAS Ground Handling, and SAS Tech) are shown below (since 2012, for years ending 31 October):

	Turnover (SEK M)	Profit before tax (EBT) (SEK M)	Number of employees (FTE) (Note: on average)	Number of passengers (M)	Passenger load factor (%)	Number of aircraft (Note: "Number of aircraft in operation/service", at year end)	Notes/sources
2009	39,696	−1,522	14,438	27.0	72.7	172	
2010	36,524	−33	13,723	27.1	75.6	159	
2011	36,735	543	13,479	29.0	74.9	157	
2012; Jan-Oct	33,148	228	13,591	25.9	76.7	156	(Note: In 2012 the company changed its financial year to 1 November – 31 October, instead of the calendar year. The figures above are therefore for years ending 31 December until 2011, for the 10 months to 31 October 2012, and for years ending 31 October thereafter.)
2013	42,182	1,648	14,127	30.4	75.0	151	
2014	38,006	−918	12,329	29.4	76.9	156	
2015	39,650	1,417	11,288	28.1	76.3	151	
2016	39,459	1,431	10,710	29.4	76.0	156	
2017	42,654	1,725	10,324	30.1	76.8	158	
2018	44,718	2,041	10,146	30.1	75.7	157	
2019	46,112	794	10,445	29.8	75.2	158	
2020	20,513	−10,097	7,568	12.6	60.5	135	(Note: 2020: Activities and income in fiscal 2020 were severely reduced by the impact of the coronavirus pandemic)
2021	13,958	−6,525	5,216	7.6	46.7	129	
2022	31,824	−7,846	7,033	17.9	69.6	134	
2023	42,043	−5,516	7,959	23.7	75.4	134	
2024	45,883	1,736	8,591	25.2	79.0	133	
2025	49,106	888	9,075	28.3	82.8	140	

=== Head office ===
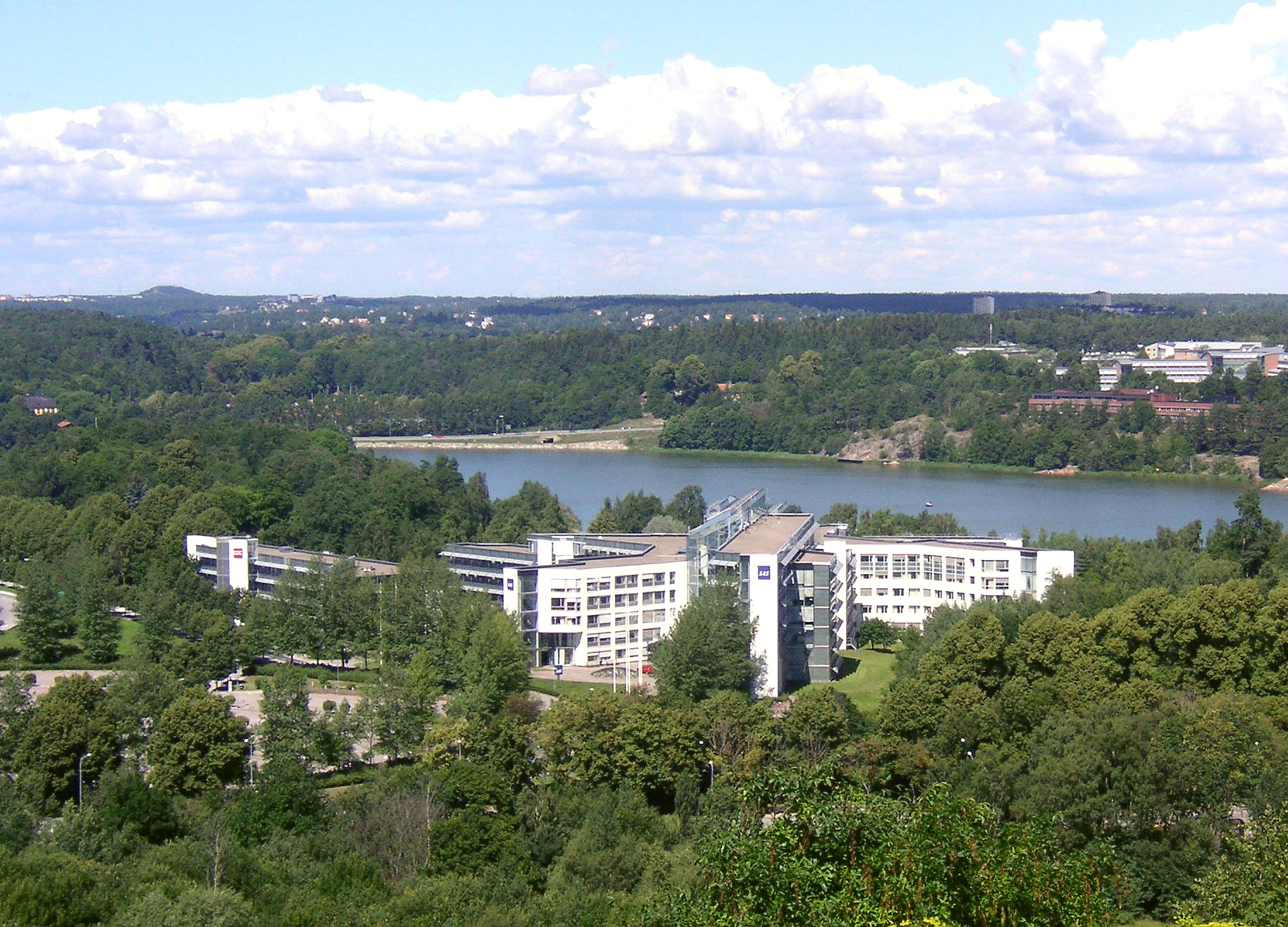
The current head office, the SAS Frösundavik Office Building as seen in 2007

Scandinavian Airlines' head office is located in the SAS Frösundavik Office Building in Frösundavik, Solna Municipality, Stockholm County. Between 2011 and 2013, the head office was located at Stockholm Arlanda Airport (ARN) in Sigtuna Municipality, Sweden. The SAS Cargo Group A/S head office is in Kastrup, Tårnby Municipality, Denmark.

The SAS Frösundavik Office Building, was designed by Niels Torp Architects and built between 1985 and 1987. The move from Solna to Arlanda was completed in 2010. A previous SAS head office was located on the grounds of Bromma Airport in Stockholm. In 2013, SAS announced that it once again would relocate to Frösundavik.

== Emissions ==
Data for passengers, aircraft and profit from section Business Trends above.

Verified emissions as reported in EU ETS
Year	2013	2014	2015	2016	2017	2018
Emissions (tonnes CO_{2}e)	2334686	2366299	2357470	2432546	2485804	2466820
Passengers (millions)	30.4	29.4	28.1	29.4	30.1	30.1
Emissions per passenger (kg)	77	80	84	83	83	82
Aircraft	139	138	152	156	158	157
Emissions per aircraft (tonnes CO_{2}e)	16796	17147	15510	15593	15733	15712
Profit (million SEK)	1648	−918	1417	1431	1725	2041
Profit per emissions (SEK/tonne)	706	−388	601	588	694	827

In contrast to most other businesses and private individuals in Sweden, airlines are exempt from the Swedish carbon tax. Had SAS paid the Swedish carbon tax level of SEK 1180 (EUR 114) per tonne (as of 2019) for all of its emissions, it would have had significant impact on recent profit levels. Since 2012, airlines are included in the EU ETS. In January 2013, the price for extra emission rights on top of the granted were approximately EUR 6.3 per tonne. In May 2017, the price was EUR 4.9 per tonne.

== Destinations ==
=== Joint ventures ===
Scandinavian Airlines has Joint venture agreements with the following airlines:

- Singapore Airlines

=== Codeshare agreements ===
Scandinavian Airlines has codeshare agreements with the following airlines:

- Aeromexico
- airBaltic
- Air Europa
- Air France
- All Nippon Airways
- Delta Air Lines
- El Al
- Etihad Airways
- Garuda Indonesia
- KLM
- LOT Polish Airlines
- TAP Air Portugal
- TAROM
- Thai Airways International
- Vietnam Airlines
- Virgin Atlantic
- WestJet

=== Interline agreements ===
Scandinavian Airlines has interlining agreements with the following airlines:

- Aerolíneas Argentinas
- Air Dolomiti
- Air Greenland
- Air India
- Asiana Airlines
- Austrian Airlines
- Avianca
- Bangkok Airways
- China Eastern Airlines
- DAT
- EVA Air
- Korean Air
- Lufthansa
- Turkish Airlines
- Widerøe

== Fleet ==
=== Current fleet ===
As of September 2025, Scandinavian Airlines operates an all-Airbus mainline fleet composed of the following aircraft:

Scandinavian Airlines mainline fleet
Aircraft	In service	Orders	Passengers				Notes
Aircraft	In service	Orders	J	W	Y	Total	Notes
Airbus A319-100	4	—	—	—	150	150	One aircraft (OY-KBO) painted in retro livery.
Airbus A320-200	5	—	—	—	168	168	
Airbus A320neo	48	2	—	—	180	180	Deliveries until 2025.
Airbus A321LR	3	—	22	12	123	157	
Airbus A330-300	8	10	32	56	178	266	Five lease orders will be former Virgin Atlantic aircraft.
Airbus A330-900	—	20	TBA				Order with 10 options. Two orders are leases from Avolon.
Airbus A350-900	6	—	40	32	228	300	
Total	72	34					

Additionally, SAS operates a single Boeing 737-700 equipped for MEDEVAC on behalf of the Norwegian Armed Forces and the Norwegian Directorate for Health and Social Affairs. This last remaining 737 is to be retired and replaced by a similarly configured Airbus A320neo.

As of August 2025, Scandinavian Airlines also has the following regional aircraft operated by its subsidiaries and other carriers under wet-lease agreements:

Scandinavian Airlines contracted fleet
Aircraft	In service	Orders	Passengers				Notes
Aircraft	In service	Orders	J	W	Y	Total	Notes
Airbus A320neo	34	1	—	—	180	180	Operated by SAS Connect.
ATR 72-600	7	—	—	—	72	72	Operated by Braathens Regional Airlines.
Bombardier CRJ900	4	—	—	—	88	88	Operated by CityJet.
Bombardier CRJ900	9	—	—	—	90	90	Operated by CityJet.
Embraer E195	15	—	—	—	122	122	Operated by SAS Link.
Embraer E195-E2	—	45	TBA				To be operated by SAS Link. Order with 10 options.
Total	67	48					

=== Future fleet plans ===
==== Short haul ====
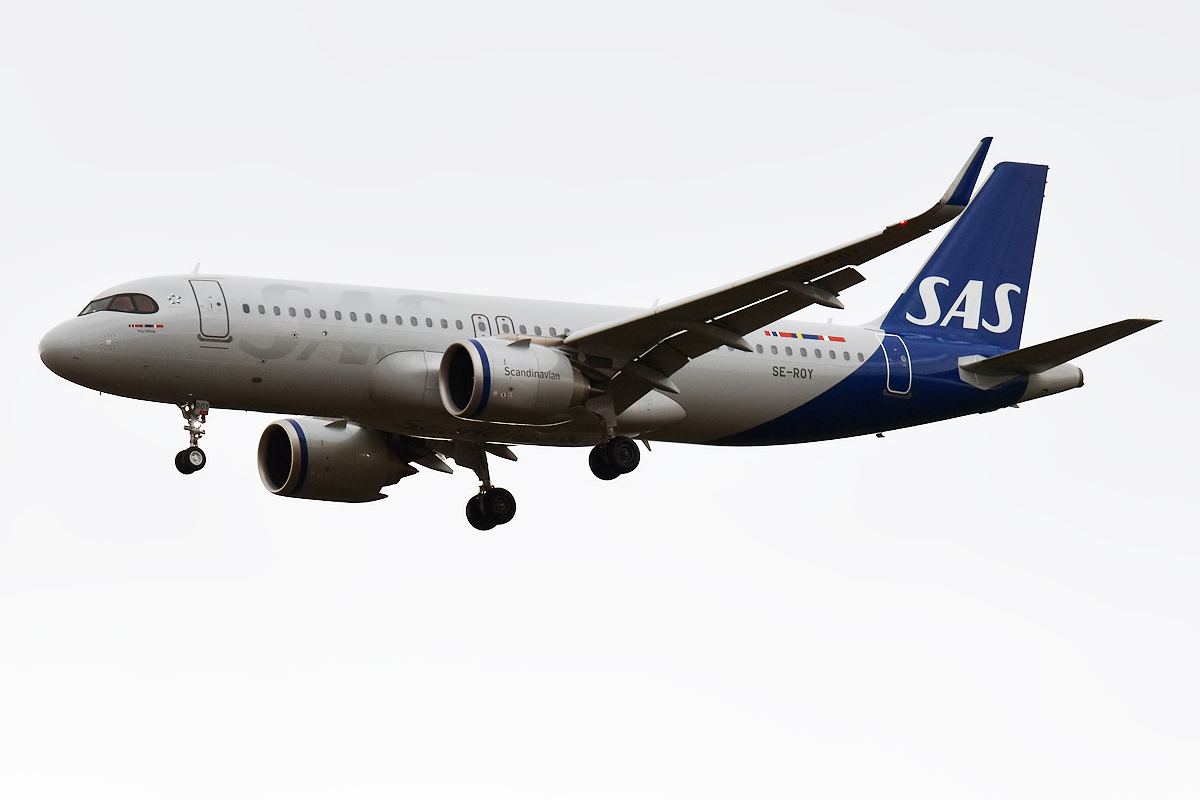
SAS Airbus A320neo in the airline's current livery

On 20 June 2011, SAS announced an order for 30 new A320neo aircraft as part of its fleet harmonization plan. SAS' stated goal is to have an all-Airbus fleet at its bases in Stockholm and Copenhagen by 2019, with a mixed A320neo and A320ceo fleet operation at both bases. The base in Oslo was then operating mostly Boeing 737-800 aircraft, with a few 737-700s also being retained at the time. The older, smaller 737-600s were disposed of in 2019. The first order of A320neos was delivered in October 2016.

In April 2018, SAS announced an order of 50 more A320neos to replace all 737NGs and older A320ceos in service as part of its goal to have an all-Airbus fleet by 2023. The last Boeing 737 has been phased out of the fleet on 19 November 2023. This Boeing 737-700, registered LN-RRB and named "Dag Viking", was operating as SAS Flight 737. As of now, the aircraft is currently operated by Canadian North as C-FHNH.

==== Long haul ====
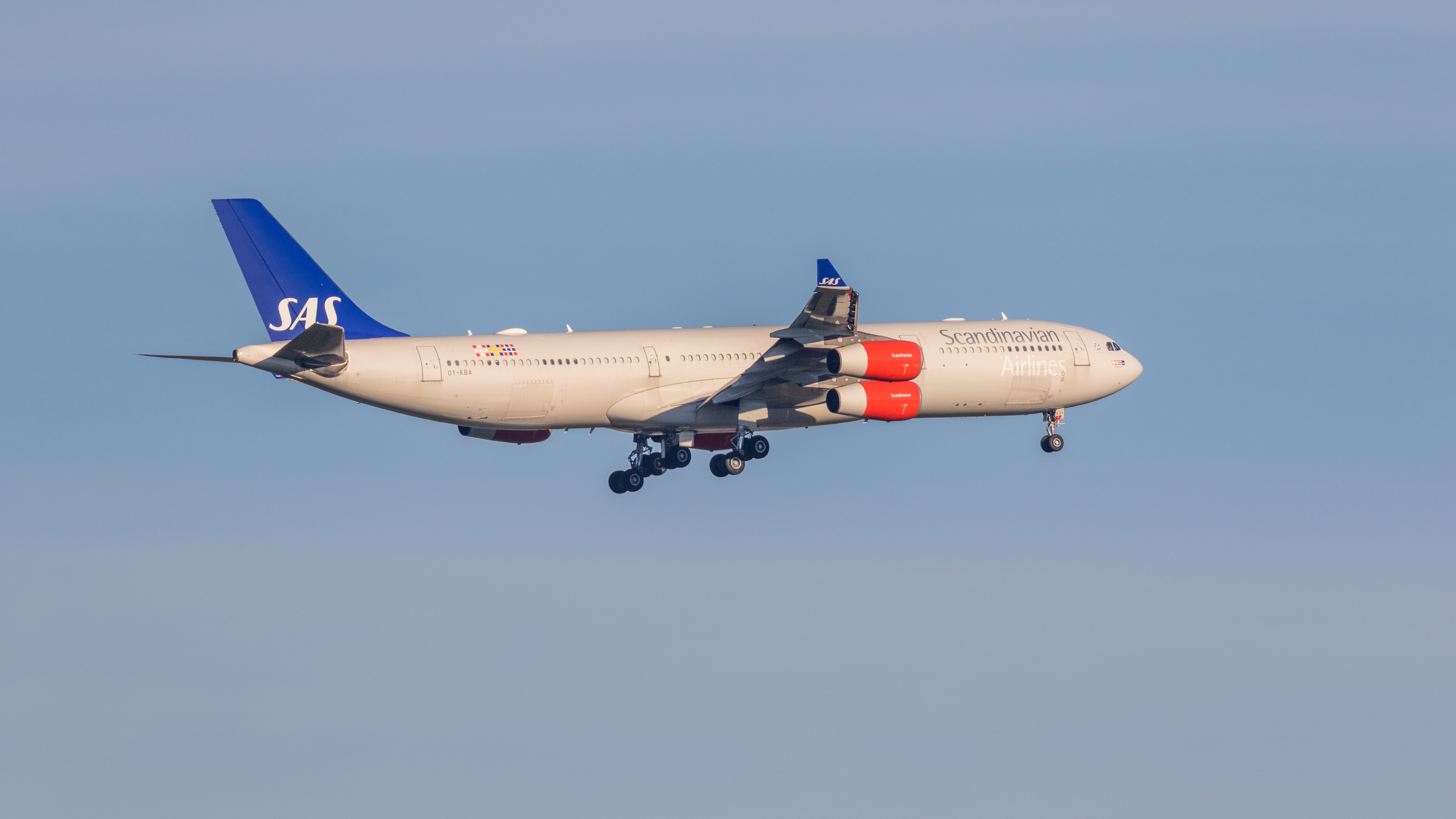
Airbus A340-313

On 25 June 2013, SAS and Airbus signed a memorandum of understanding stating that SAS intends to buy twelve new-generation aircraft, including six options. The agreement consists of eight A350-900s with six options and four A330-300Es. The first new long-haul aircraft to enter service will be the A330-300E, which was originally planned to replace the aging A340-300s in 2015 as leasing agreements on these aircraft expire. Instead, SAS renewed the leasing agreements to be able to expand its long-haul fleet and used the new A330-300Es to add more long-haul destinations to its network.

The first six of eight Airbus A350-900s for SAS were delivered to the airline in 2019 and were to be operating long-haul routes from 2020. The A350 will first fly on the Copenhagen and Chicago route, with the airline planning Beijing, New York, Tokyo, Shanghai, Hong Kong and San Francisco when more A350 aircraft are delivered.

=== Livery ===
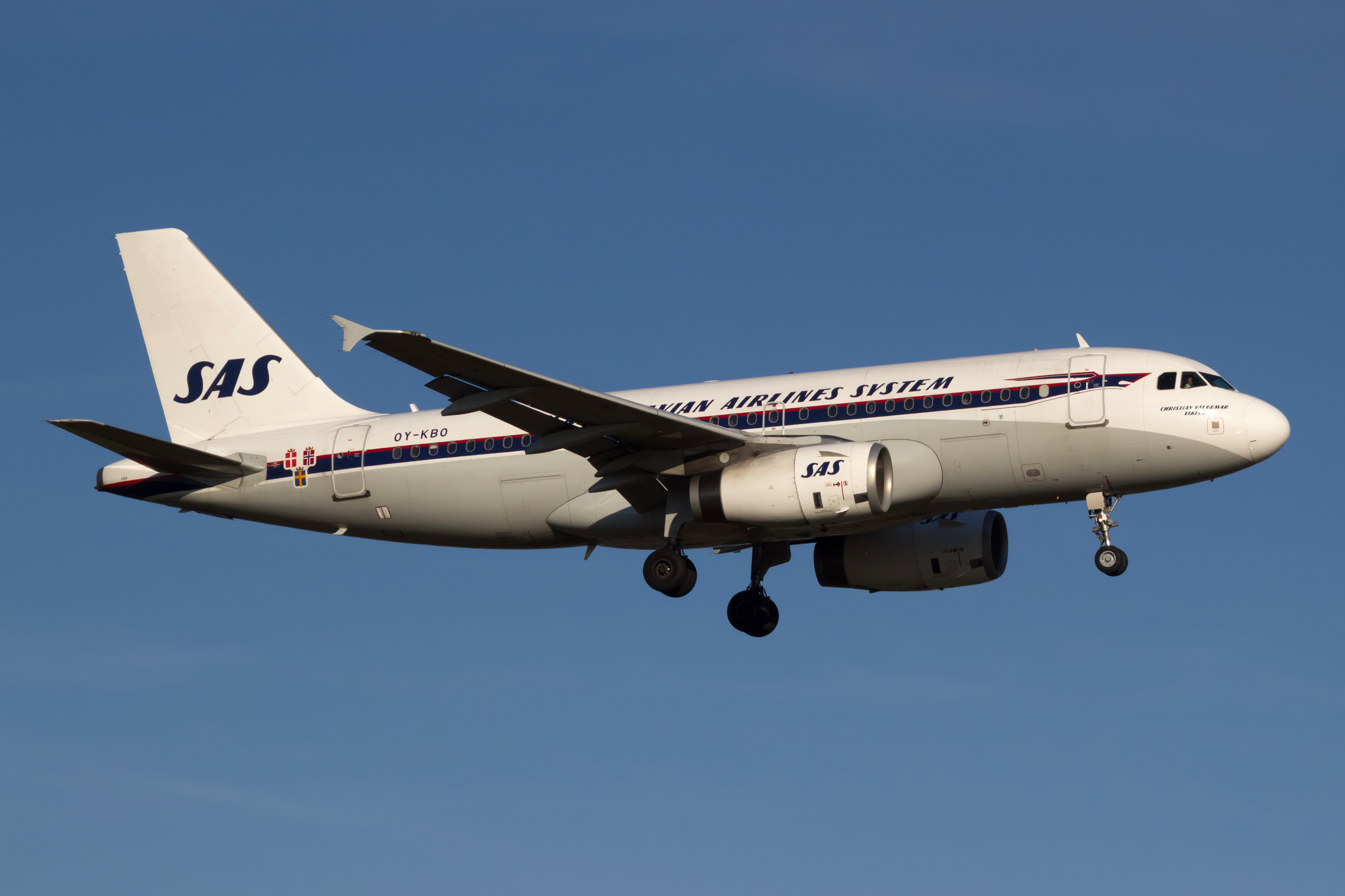
Airbus A319 OY-KBO, named Christian Valdemar Viking in honor of Prince Christian of Denmark, wearing a special retro livery

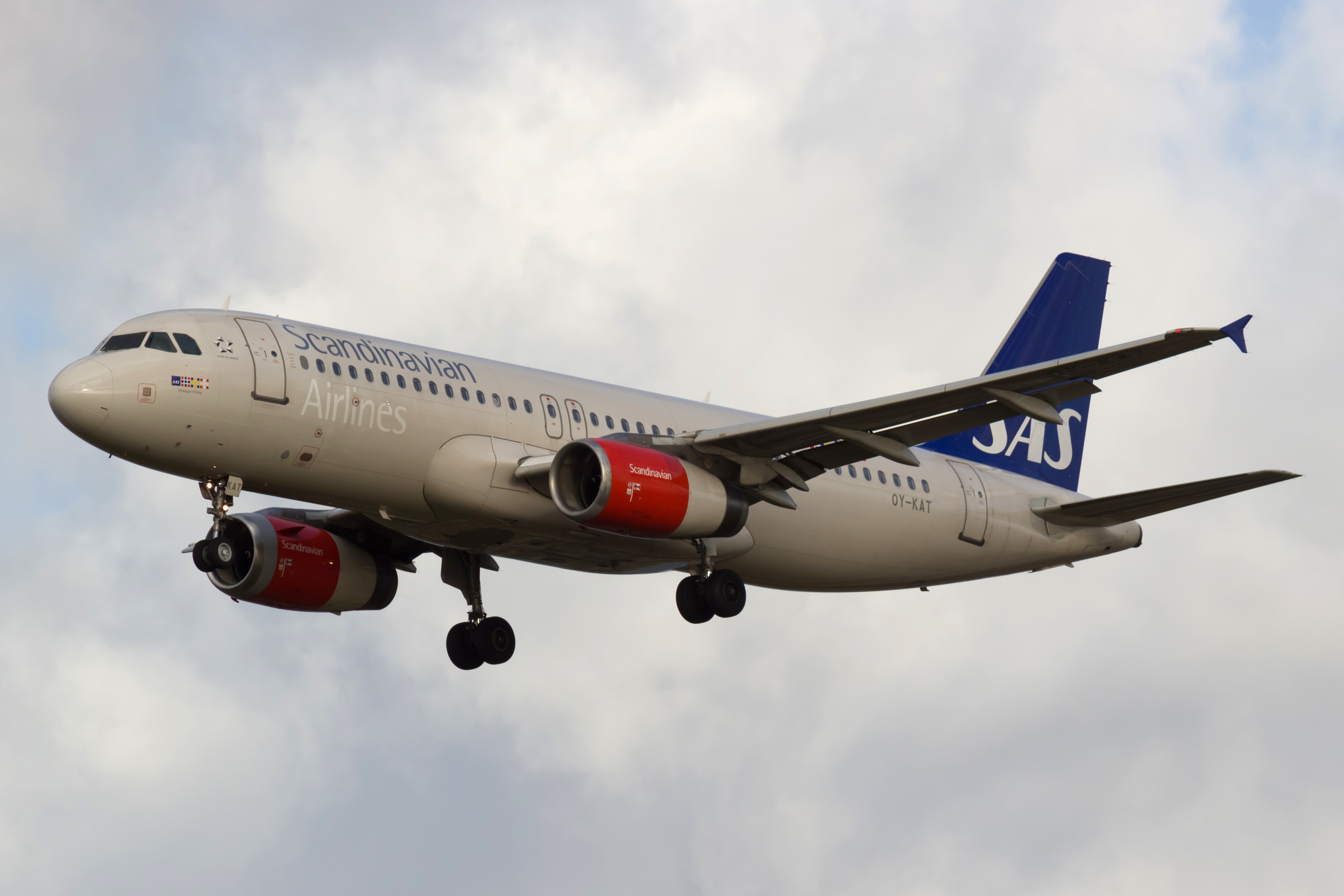
An Airbus A320-200 in the former SAS livery

In September 2019, SAS unveiled new livery for its fleet, initially implemented on new A350 and A320neo aircraft, with all aircraft repainted in the following five years. The fuselage is light grey with the "SAS" logotype in silver displayed prominently across the height of the front section. The vertical stabilizer and adjacent parts of the fuselage are blue, with the SAS logo in white shown on the stabilizer. The blue area on the rear fuselage extends towards the front in a curved line. The horizontal stabilizers are beige (except for the ATR 72 aircraft, where they are blue). Winglets are blue as well. The engine casings are beige with a vertical blue stripe at the front and bear the word "Scandinavian" in blue. "Scandinavian" in large blue letters is also displayed on the underbelly of the aircraft.

The previous livery, designed by SthlmLab (Stockholm Design Lab), had been introduced in 1998. SAS aircraft look predominantly white; however, the fuselage is in a very light beige (Pantone Warm Gray 2/Pantone 9083C) with "Scandinavian" above the windows in silver lettering (Pantone 877) and "Airlines" below the windows in white. The typeface used is Rotis Semi Serif. The vertical stabilizer (and winglets) are painted blue (Pantone 2738C) with the classic white SAS logo on it. It is a variant of the traditional SAS logotype, slimmed slightly and stylized by the design company Stockholm Design Lab as part of the SAS livery change. The engine casing is painted in scarlet (Pantone Warm Red/Pantone 179C) with the word Scandinavian in white, the thrust reversers in the color of the fuselage. All other text is painted in Pantone Warm Gray 9. The design also features stylized versions of the Scandinavian flags. All aircraft are named, traditionally after Vikings.

To celebrate its 60th anniversary in 2006, SAS painted its first Airbus A319-100, with registration OY-KBO and name "Christian Valdemar Viking", in retro livery; it remained in service as of 2025.

To celebrate its 80th anniversary in 2026, SAS painted an A330-300, with registration LN-RKR in a special livery. The body is painted in SAS blue, the number 80 on the vertical stabiliser, large SAS wordmark in silver on the forward fuselage, and the Scandinavian flags as stripes around the fuselage, similar to their logo in the 1980s.

== Cabin ==
=== SAS Business ===
On long-haul flights, business class, called SAS Business, is offered and features wide sleeper seats. On the A330s and A350s, seating is 1-2-1 on seats that convert into 196–202-centimetre (77–80 in) flat beds, with power sockets and a 15-inch (380 mm) entertainment screen. On the A321LRs, business class has alternating 2-2 and 1-1 seating, all convertible to flat beds.

=== SAS Plus ===
Plus is SAS' premium economy class. On the A330s, seating is 2-3-2, 2-4-2 on the A350s and 2-2 on the A321LR. The seats offered on SAS Plus are wider than those in the SAS Go section.

On European flights, SAS Plus tickets are refundable and include a meal, a double checked-in baggage allowance, and access to lounges and fast track security at the airport. The SAS Plus passengers are seated at the front of the aircraft and passengers can choose their seat at booking for free, but the seats there are otherwise the same as the SAS Go seats. The two-class system was introduced in June 2013, when business class was eliminated from intra-European flights.

== Services ==
=== EuroBonus ===
SAS's frequent-flyer program is called EuroBonus. Members earn points on all SAS flights, Widerøe routes with no SAS competition (except Public Service Operations) as well as on Skyteam flights. Around 50 percent of SAS' total revenues are generated by EuroBonus members. By August 2015, the EuroBonus program had in excess of four million members.

=== Hovercraft ===
Between 1984 and 1994, SAS operated a hovercraft service between Malmö in Sweden and Copenhagen Airport in Denmark. Travellers could check in for their flights in Malmö and the hovercraft were operated as connecting flights. The service was operated using a handful of British Hovercraft Corporation AP1-88s, which took an average journey time of 45 minutes to traverse the 27 km (17 mi) route across the Øresund; within its first year of operation, hovercraft reportedly carried roughly 100,000 passengers. Due to the level of demand experienced, SAS examined the prospects for introducing larger hovercraft, capable of carrying up to 200 passengers, for the service. However, in 1994, the hovercraft were replaced by catamarans. These vessels were in turn discontinued during 2000 due to the opening of the Öresund bridge, which provided a competing rail link between Malmö and Copenhagen airport.

=== Wi‑Fi ===
During May 2018, SAS launched a new high-speed Wi‑Fi internet access system supplied by Viasat. The new system was announced to enable passengers to stream movies on board. Prior to this, SAS offered Internet access on board on its long haul aircraft and a small number of Boeing 737s. Wi‑Fi internet access is free for Eurobonus Gold and Diamond members and those with Business Class tickets. Otherwise, it can be purchased with EuroBonus points or for a fee.

In March 2026, SAS announced they will be introducing a new generation of onboard connectivity with Starlink, and in partnership with vendor 3. Introduction for SAS main fleet takes place during 2026 and this will expand the free Wi-Fi access offer to all Eurobonus members and 3 customers.

== Accidents and incidents ==
=== Non-aviation related incidents ===
==== Controversial advertising campaign ====
On 10 February 2020, SAS released 2 minutes and 45 seconds long commercial on YouTube titled "What is truly Scandinavian?" which tells a story about company's values and highlighting the ideas and inventions that globalism brought to Scandinavia, which caused an outrage among right-wing groups due to its perceived denigration of Scandinavian culture. On 12 February 2020, SAS Group, a parent company of SAS, released a statement that they would continue with the advertising campaign despite the outrage.

On 13 February 2020, 3 days after the commercial was published, SAS offices in Adelgade, Copenhagen and advertising agency &Co which produced the commercial received bomb threats. Later, a shorter 45 second version of the same commercial was republished on Facebook by SAS and official version on YouTube made private.

==== Responses ====
Norwegian Air quickly reacted to the controversy by publishing the message "Fortunately, nobody can take away the cheese slicer from us" (Norwegian: Heldigvis kan ingen ta fra oss ostehøvelen) and an image on Facebook of a cheese slicer, which is a Norwegian invention.

== See also ==
- SAS Group
- Norwegian Aviation College
- List of airports in Denmark, Norway, and Sweden
- List of the busiest airports in the Nordic countries
- Transport in Denmark, Norway, and Sweden

== Bibliography ==
- The making of SAS-A triumvirate in world aviation. Oslo: A/S Nationaltrykkeriet & Forlagsbokbinderiet. 1973.
- Buraas, A. (1979). The SAS saga. Oslo: Norbok.
- Endres, G. (2020). Royal Vikings. Spikkestad: European Airlines.
