= EuroBonus =

Frequent-flyer program of Scandinavian Airlines

EuroBonus is the frequent-flyer program of Scandinavian Airlines. It was launched by SAS in 1992.

== Airline partners ==
=== SAS Group ===
- Scandinavian Airlines

=== SkyTeam partner airlines ===
- Aerolíneas Argentinas
- Aeroméxico
- Air Europa
- Air France
- China Airlines
- China Eastern Airlines
- Delta Air Lines
- Garuda Indonesia
- ITA Airways
- Kenya Airways
- KLM
- Korean Air
- Middle East Airlines
- Saudia
- TAROM
- Vietnam Airlines
- Virgin Atlantic
- XiamenAir

=== Other airline partners ===
- airBaltic
- All Nippon Airways
- Etihad Airways
- Singapore Airlines

=== Former airline partners ===
- Air Greenland (partnership ended 1 January 2010)
- Atlantic Airways (partnership ended 25 March 2017)
- Star Alliance (partnership ended 31 August 2024)
- Widerøe 199 -2025, left following Norwegian's acquisition of the airline

== Hotel partners ==
- Artótel
- Best Western Hotels
- Elite Hotels
- First Hotels
- Hilton Worldwide
- Park Plaza and Park Inn
- Radisson Edwardian London Hotels
- Radisson Hotels
- Radisson Blu
- Rica Hotels
- Scandic Hotels
- Shangri-La Hotels & Resorts
- Sheraton Stockholm Hotel
- The Mayfair Hotel, London
- Thon Hotels

== Other partners ==
- Avis
- American Express (transfer Amex points plus combined card in Norway, Sweden)
- Bjurfors (available in Sweden)
- Budget car rental (only accrual)
- Call Me (Denmark only)
- Copenhagen Airport (in Denmark)
- COOP (in Sweden)
- Codan (in Denmark & Norway)
- Dagens Industri (in Sweden)
- Dagens Naeringsliv (in Norway)
- Dantaxi 4x48 (in Denmark)
- Diners Club
- DNB
- film2home (in Scandinavia/Finland)
- Fjordkraft (available in Norway)
- Flybussen (airport transfer in Oslo, Norway)
- Flygbussarna (airport transfer in Sweden)
- Flygets Långtidsparkering (airport parking in Stockholm)
- FLYGTAXI (Sweden + 23 other airports)
- Gothia Restaurants (three restaurants at Gothia Towers in Gothenburg)
- Hertz (car rental)
- International Herald Tribune
- MasterCard
- Nykredit (available in Denmark)
- +Deal (available in Denmark & Sweden)
- Preem (in Sweden)
- PresentkortTorget (gift cards available in Denmark, Finland, Norway & Sweden)
- Sixt (accrual only)
- Skandia (in Sweden)
- Stockholms Restauranger & Wärdshus (nine restaurants)
- STS Alpresor (in Scandinavia/Finland)
- The Economist
- Trumf (in Norway)
- Trygg Hansa (in Sweden)

== Membership levels ==
EuroBonus has five membership levels.

- The entry level is "Member". There are no requirements for this level, it is obtained at registration.
- The Next level is "Silver", which is attained by earning 20,000 Basic points or by flying 10 qualifying flights in a year. Benefits include business class check-in and extra baggage allowance on some flights and during some periods.
- Following that is "Gold", which requires 45,000 Basic points or 45 qualifying flights. Benefits include, but are not limited to, access to SAS and StarAlliance lounges when traveling on a StarAlliance ticket, priority check in, additional check in luggage allowance on some tickets, 25% bonus point earnings on flights. This card is a Star Alliance Gold card.
- The final tier which can be obtained via flights or points is "Diamond", which requires 90 qualifying flights or 90,000 basic points. It offers benefits like free drinks on flights, higher standby priority, get to give away a gold card to a friend and a number of free upgrades per year, even if this is not formalized or publicly provided information. It is also a Star Alliance Gold card.
- Above these levels is "Pandion" which is awarded personally to 1,500 selected customers by the CEO of SAS. Each Pandion membership is reevaluated yearly, and they have to "fly more than the pilots and crew of SAS" in order to be eligible. In practise membership is awarded according to revenue created for SAS by a single flyer rather than the number of EuroBonus points earned. Benefits include guaranteed seats on SAS flights, even on fully booked flights, and "exclusive" service.

All statuses are obtained for one year, plus for the remainder of the qualifying year in which the member qualifies for the specific level. Unlike many other programs, the EuroBonus qualification year is individual and not aligned with calendar years. A qualifying year is determined by the data a member joined Eurobonus, instead. So if someone joins in April, the qualifying year for that member will be from April to March the next year.

Before 2010, qualification for a next level was only possible with meeting point thresholds. Since 2010 it is also possible to achieve Silver and Gold status by taking a certain number of SAS and Widerøe flights: 10/45/90 individual flights for Silver/Gold/Diamond. Gold/Diamond benefits include all Silver benefits, plus priority security at certain airports, access to SAS and Star Alliance lounges and a 25% bonus on points on SAS Group flights.

=== Membership level changes in 2014 ===
SAS changed the program's membership levels in April 2014. Notable changes included access to most SAS lounges for Silver members during the summer and Christmas season, the ability for Gold members to give away Silver card and lower requirements to reach Silver level. Additionally, a new level was introduced - Diamond. Diamond members will be able to give away Gold card and their points will not expire. Diamond level will be awarded by flying 90 one-way trips or collecting 90,000 points during one year.

=== Membership level changes in 2015 ===
On 1 January 2015, SAS again made some significant changes to the EuroBonus program. These changes affect both the thresholds for reaching elite status and earning tables.

==== Changes in thresholds ====
The requirements for reaching both Gold and Diamond level were lowered by 10%. This means:

- Gold now requires 45 legs or 45,000 points instead of 50 legs or 50,000 points
- Diamond now requires 90 legs or 90,000 points instead of 100 legs or 100,000 points

==== Changes in point earnings ====
SAS carried out some major restructuring of its point earning tables. The most significant changes are:

- Strongly reduced point earnings on all flights, on average around 50%
- Booking classes became decisive in point earnings, instead of seating class:
  - Economy is now divided between Economy Go and Go Flex,
  - Plus is now divided between Plus Saver and Plus,
  - Business is now divided between Business Saver and Business
- Europe is no longer divided into several point earning zones. Everything outside the Nordic and Baltic countries is now considered Europe.

=== Switch to SkyTeam in 2024 ===
SAS EuroBonus ended its participation in the Star Alliance scheme on 31 August 2024 following SAS’s announced realignment and subsequently became associated with SkyTeam when the airline formally joined the alliance on 1 September 2024. Existing EuroBonus tiers, points balances, and qualification rules were retained through the transition, with members continuing to earn and redeem points on Star Alliance carriers until the withdrawal date. From 1 September 2024, EuroBonus earning, redemption, and reciprocal elite‑recognition benefits became available across most SkyTeam airlines, with some partner integrations introduced in phases. EuroBonus Gold and Diamond members now correspond to SkyTeam Elite and Elite Plus, granting access to SkyPriority services, lounges, and other alliance‑wide benefits.

== Norwegian ban on frequent flyer miles ==
Frequent flyer mile accrual was banned on Norwegian domestic flights between August 2002 and May 2013. In 2002, SAS bought up the rival airline Braathens, giving the company a near monopoly on major domestic routes within Norway. After a few months, the airline Norwegian Air Shuttle started flying major routes in competition. To remove the edge SAS had over the new airline, the Norwegian Competition Authority then banned the award of EuroBonus points in Norway from August 1 that year.

In 2005, Morten A. Meyer, the Modernization Minister asked the competition authority to consider extending the ban on frequent flyer miles to include all of Scandinavia. Norwegian Air Shuttle and Sterling Airlines had also complained about SAS's bonus program in Scandinavia. It was pointed out that the situation on these routes was different from the monopoly which had been present on the Norwegian domestic market.

The authorities indicated in 2007 that the ban on frequent flyer points would continue, arguing that the ban on EuroBonus had reduced ticket prices by 30% and boosted competition. SAS Norge, the Norwegian affiliate of SAS, protested, arguing that the extent of the fare reduction was exaggerated (claiming 18.4% rather than 30%) and was due to more efficient spending, not the ban on EuroBonus.

Following the development of the market, whereby Norwegian Air Shuttle has grown since its launch in 2002 to become equal in size to SAS on most major domestic routes, the Norwegian Competition Authority begun yet another evaluation of the ban on domestic frequent flyer points in December 2010. The government lifted the ban on 16 May 2013, noting that the competition in the Norwegian airline market had improved. The European Free Trade Association Surveillance Authority had previously considered the ban illegal.
