= Olaf Larsen =

Norwegian chocolate manufacturer (1867–1920)

- Born: 1867
- Died: 1920 (aged 52–53)
- Occupation: Chocolate manufacturer
- Known for: Co-founding the chocolate factories Freia, Bergene, and Asola

Olaf Larsen (1867–1920) was a Norwegian chocolate manufacturer. He was central to the founding of three chocolate factories: Freia, Bergene, and Asola.

== Background ==
Larsen was the son of a farmer at Jørgensløkka on Oppsal, near today's Vilberggrenda, and he is said to have experimented with chocolate production at home on the farm. Nearby lay Sarabråten, where Thomas Heftye had his summer villa, frequented by many in Heftye's enormous network among the cultural, economic, and political elite of Christiania, who came among other things to hunt in the forests of Østmarka.

A colorful origin myth holds that the home production at Oppsal began after the young Olaf was given a copy of the book Hur man gör Choklad ("How to make chocolate") by a Swede in one such hunting party at Sarabråten — said to have been the king himself, hunting incognito, led by another Heftye friend, the writer Jonas Lie. The duller and probably truer story is that Larsen learned the chocolate trade while working at Brødrene Ottesens Chocolade & bonbonfabrik. This factory first lay at Bryn and later moved to the center, from 1898 in its own factory building by the Akerselva that still stands at Nedre Vaskegang 2. Ottesen's factory was the first and largest chocolate factory in Oslo, and the work there inspired Larsen to start out on his own. Lacking the start-up capital for comparable industrial production, he first tried in a country manner with handcraft production at home on Oppsal and his own sales from a stall at Stortorvet.

== The Freia chocolate factory ==
The real connection between Larsen and the Sarabråten circle is said to have been that another Heftye friend, the wholesaler Fredrik Christensen (1851–1913), happened to meet the young Olaf Larsen on a hunting trip there in 1888, together with his distant nephew Albert Hiorth. They heard about queues of satisfied customers in front of Larsen's market stall, and the wholesaler decided to come in as a distributor and increase production. He arranged factory premises at Rodeløkken, by the iron foundry of his cousin Fredrik Hiorth. In December 1889 Christensen registered the start-up of Dampchocoladefabrikken Freia, said to have been named after Christensen's Swedish wife, Frida, lightly reworked into the perhaps more pleasing name Freia. Olaf Larsen brought in his brother Magnus, and four women were hired. In its simple premises at Rodeløkken, Freia remained a small backyard industry that at most had a dozen or so employees.

This changed when Christensen became acquainted with a junior partner in one of the capital's import agencies, which among other things sold the Brazilian coffee brand Lacerda to the wholesaler. The agent was Johan Throne-Holst of Trondheim, who had shown an interest in industrial production. One spring day in 1892, Larsen offered the 23-year-old the chance to buy Freia, and in youthful boldness Throne-Holst took it, securing the factory for 9,000 kroner. Larsen was to continue as works master — in reality factory manager — while Throne-Holst would sell the goods and lead the business.

Two years later Larsen put his own money into Freia and became owner of one-eighth of the company, the money having come from property speculation. The cooperation between the bourgeois Throne-Holst and the farmer's son Larsen from Østre Aker did not go well, for Larsen's ambitions stretched further than being a subordinate manager in another man's company. Increasingly successful property speculation meant Larsen eventually had money to invest both in Freia's continual expansions and, in time, in a factory entirely his own.

== The Asola chocolate factory ==
Freia became a joint-stock company in 1898. Larsen sat on the board by virtue of his shareholding but was soon barred from board meetings: only weeks after A/S Freia's first general meeting, he established Olaf Larsen & Co., which the following year changed its name to Olaf Larsens Chokoladefabrik, thereby declaring open war on Throne-Holst. Just a few hundred meters from Freia he set up a new factory and lured away a long line of loyal chocolate workers from Freia, to the understandable displeasure of Throne-Holst and the rest of Freia's board.

Worse came the following year, when Larsen launched a large-scale price war on chocolate that immediately destroyed profitability at Freia, and presumably at most other chocolate factories too, Larsen's included. This was not a long-term solution, and it was a fight he lost to Throne-Holst, who responded by withdrawing from the price war and instead increasing marketing and brand-building around Freia and investing in finer chocolates and confectionery. Freia thus came through the war best, while Larsen's new factory foundered. He was hit twice over, as 1899 was also the year of the great crisis in the Kristiania property market, the Kristiania crash: the speculation bubble burst, and a player like Larsen, without a financial safety net, was hard hit. The new factory at Rodeløkken, with all its equipment, had to be sold.

== Bergene buys the factory ==
The factory stood empty and unused until, in the autumn of 1905, it was bought by Anders Bergene, also a Christiania wholesaler, who had established a small drops factory in the 1890s. In the spring of 1906, A. Bergenes Chokoladefabrik started in the premises, and this too became one of the country's largest chocolate factories, today part of Nidar. Olaf Larsen was thus central to the founding of what became both Freia and Bergene, two of the strongest brand names in Norwegian chocolate history.

== A factory of his own, on the third attempt ==
Larsen's dream of his own chocolate factory lived on, and in 1902 he started over for the third time with A/S OLaf LArsens Chokoladefabrik (ASOLA), which also launched what became the brand and eventually the company name. After a roving existence in various smaller premises, in 1911 he came across a site at Akersbakken and built a new factory there with around 75 workers. During the First World War turnover rose at first, and the factory had 200 workers.

Olaf Larsen died in 1920, only 52 years old. His son Orvar (1898–1965) took over as manager and led the company until it was sold to an association of grocery wholesalers in 1938. In 1968 Tiedemanns Tobaksfabrik became the new owner, chocolate production was discontinued in 1974, and the factory was closed in 1985.
