= Asola Chokoladefabrik =

Former Norwegian chocolate factory

- Formerly: A/S Olaf Larsens Chokoladefabrik
- Company type: Aksjeselskap
- Industry: Confectionery
- Founded: 16 April 1902
- Defunct: 1985
- Fate: Acquired by Nestlé Norge
- Headquarters: Oslo, later Vestby, Norway
- Key people: Olaf Larsen
- Products: Chocolate, sweets, caramels, pastilles

Asola Chokoladefabrik was one of Oslo's three leading chocolate factories, together with Freia and Bergene. It was founded by Olaf Larsen, who had also been involved in setting up both Freia and Bergene. Asola was Larsen's third venture and was founded in 1902, its name formed from AS and the initials of the founder's name.

Asola produced chocolate, drops, caramels, and pastilles, among them IFA. The factory was at Akersbakken 10 in Oslo until it moved to Vestby in 1965, where it operated until 1985.

== Well-known brands ==
Well-known brands from Asola included the fondant-filled Cavaler and Egg Cognac, Gull milk chocolate, Luxus milk chocolate, the cooking chocolates Trilling, Mokka, Grand, and Galla, Jaffa Orange, banana chocolate, and the confection Snurre. The company also produced other foodstuffs, and was early with dried soup in powder sachets, such as fruit soup and vegetable soup.

The best-known product is probably the IFA pastille, which still exists as a brand. IFA was launched in 1930 and named after the opera singer Ivar Fridtjof Andresen, a nephew of Olaf Larsen's wife Ingeborg Johanne. Andresen's celebrity and the association with a powerful voice were used to build credibility for the pastille, which was marketed as protection against a sore throat. IFA ended up at Nidar in Trondheim after Asola transferred its drops production to Kiellands Dropsfabrikk in 1968, and Nidar took over Kiellands in 1975.

== History ==
Olaf Larsen started his first factory under his own name in 1898. He broke with his business partner Throne-Holst at Freia and started his new factory right next to the competitor Freia, but it folded after a short time, and the buildings and machines were bought by Anders Bergene in 1905.

Larsen started A/S Olaf Larsens Chokoladefabrik (Asola) in 1902. After a roving existence in various smaller premises, in 1909 he came across a site at Akersbakken and built a new factory there, designed by the architect Sigurd R. Gulbransen, who had also designed parts of the Freia factory. The new factory came into operation in 1910 with around 75 workers. During the First World War turnover rose, and the factory expanded with new buildings and grew to over 200 workers.

Olaf Larsen died in 1920, only 52 years old, and his son Orvar (1898–1965) took over as manager. He led the company through the turbulent 1920s until, faced with a raised luxury tax on goods such as chocolate to 33 percent, he was forced to close in 1922 because of declining sales; the Oslo branch of Cloetta did the same.

The chocolate factory did not start up again until 1930. To relaunch the brand, the revue star of the day, Victor Bernau, was engaged to arrange a slogan competition, heavily promoted in newspaper advertisements and on the radio through the autumn up to the announcement of the winners on the Oslo Broadcasting Company. Large prizes were offered to the winner, over 10,000 kroner in today's value. Among 38,000 entries, "Alle smaker mig – ingen vraker mig" ("Everyone tastes me – no one rejects me"), submitted by Margrete Jensen of Bergen, won by a draw at the police station over the candidates "Høieste ydelse av næring og nydelse" and "Asolamerket, kronen på verket!"

=== New wholesalers as new owners ===
In 1938 Larsen's company was taken over by Elgsæter Fabrikker in Trondheim and re-established as A/S Asola Chokoladefabrikk. Elgsæter was a company backed by several of the country's largest wholesalers, in Trondheim and Bergen among other places, through Norges Colonialgrossisters Forbund. Emil Cappelen was brought in from Christiania Dropsfabrikk as managing director of Asola, with Johan Schjølberg of Bodø as office manager.

The wholesalers wanted to secure market power by producing several of the goods they were to sell, both chemical-technical products such as soap and toothpaste and foodstuffs such as coffee, chocolate, and baked goods. After this, Asola was part of a larger production network controlled by what became a private wholesalers' cooperation that developed after the Second World War under the name KØFF. This was a trend that had grown in the 1930s, partly as a result of the rise of the NKL cooperative in production and in the wholesale and retail links of the grocery trade.

=== Asola in Vestby ===
In 1965 Asola left Oslo and invested heavily in a new factory in Vestby. Bjarne Rundhovde of Moss had become manager by this time, while the production manager Hjalmar "Ruben" Jensen, with long experience from Freia and Kielland, kept up old recipes while developing new ones. The new factory was nearly 10,000 square meters, and a large rationalization scheme underlay the planning. New premises, new machines, and an efficient structure gave hope of greater profitability through both increased production and reduced staffing, from around 120 to 70 workers.

The plan was to continue with chocolate and sugar goods, but the Vestby plant also opened possibilities for other kinds of food production. In 1965 Aftenposten hinted secretively at large export opportunities, suggesting that a large American chain had taken Asola products into its range; food exports to the United States were no small matter.

The investment in Vestby brought a large increase in capacity that could not be fully used, and the great American venture appears not to have materialized, so profitability was poor. Cooperation was then begun within the industry, including with Kiellands Dropsfabrikk, which took over some products, among them the IFA pastille.

In 1968 a new large-industrial owner came in when Tiedemanns took over Asola. Expecting a decline in tobacco, Tiedemann invested in other industry, including foodstuffs and snacks, and the large group could help make better use of the Vestby plant. The last Asola chocolate was produced in 1974. When chocolate production was closed, the production of dog food and oat nuts at the Stavanger factory No-Ko, also controlled by Tiedemanns, was moved from Stavanger to the Asola factory in Vestby, and Tiedemanns used the remaining capacity to pack tobacco goods.

Asola in Vestby continued as a producer and marketer of cat and dog food, including Snøgg dog food, and of snacks and breakfast cereal such as golden oat nuts. In 1985 all of this was taken over by Nestlé Norge.
