= Helvetiafjellet formation =

Geological formation in Svalbard

- Stratigraphic range: Lower Cretaceous, ~120–127 Ma
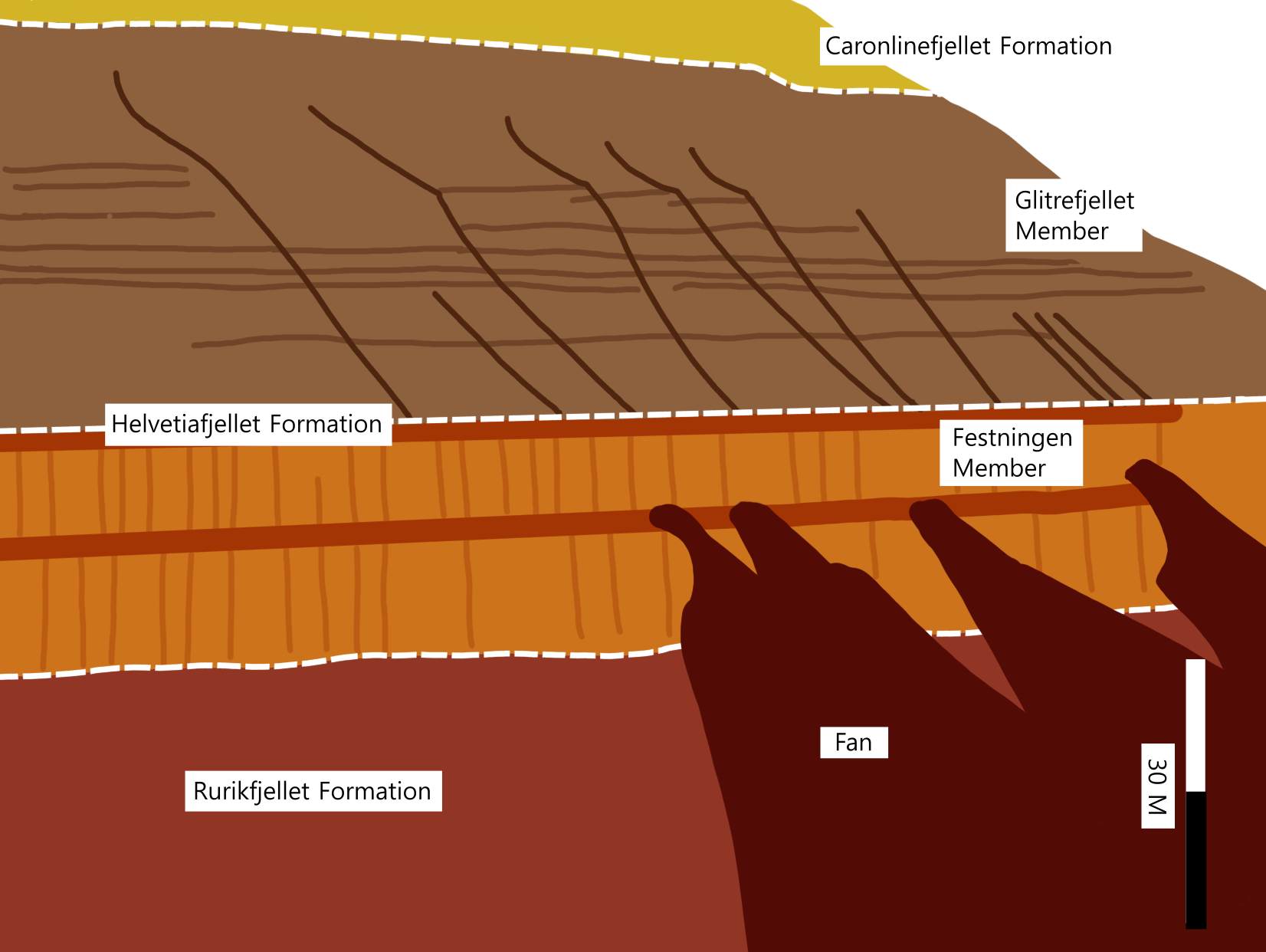
- Figure based on
- Type: Geological formation
- Unit of: Adventdalen Group
- Sub-units: Festningen member Glitrefjellet member
- Underlies: Carolinefjellet Formation
- Overlies: Rurikfjellet Formation; Agardhfjellet Formation
- Thickness: up to 40–155 metres (130–510 ft)

Lithology
- Primary: Sandstone

Location
- Region: Svalbard; Norway

The Helvetiafjellet formation is a sequence of early Cretaceous sandstone-dominated rock found in Svalbard, Norway belonging to the Adventdalen group. The formation is 40-155m thick and has two known members: the sandstone-dominated Festningen member and the heterolithic and coal-bearing Glitrefjellet member. It has an overall transgressive development, as it shows an upward increase in marine influence. There is also evidence of a large-scale retrogradational stacking pattern, which is concluded from the presence of delta front deposits on the uppermost Glitrefjellet member.

== Geology ==
An increase in tectonic activity produced enhanced differential uplift of the Svalbard platform in the Barremian, prompting the formation of a subaerial unconformity across Svalbard. The differential uplift was also associated with widespread igneous activity, which resulted in the High Arctic Large Igenous Province (HALIP). As the result of the Paleogene development of the NNW to SSE trending West Spitsbergen Fold Belt, the Lower Cretaceous strata along the western coast of the island were affected by the syncline that formed in the fold belt's foreland basin, and are steeply dipping to the east. On the eastern part of the island and the rest of Svalbard, they are more horizontal.

The Festningen Sandstone member is the earliest member of the Helvetiafjellet Formation, with almost vertically inclined strata. The member consists of two cross-bedded sandstone bodies that is around 20m thick. The cross-bedding and the lateral extent suggest a fluvial braidplain setting. The Festningen member is followed by the Glitrefjellet member which better records the transgressive setting. The lower portion of the member is characterized by the alternation of floodplain, fluvial distributary channel and crevasse splay facies and are topped by delta front and delta plain deposits, indicating the transgression. Sandstone and mudstone beds interbedded with plant debris, silty shale and coal seams are the prominent rock types present.

== Dinosaurs ==
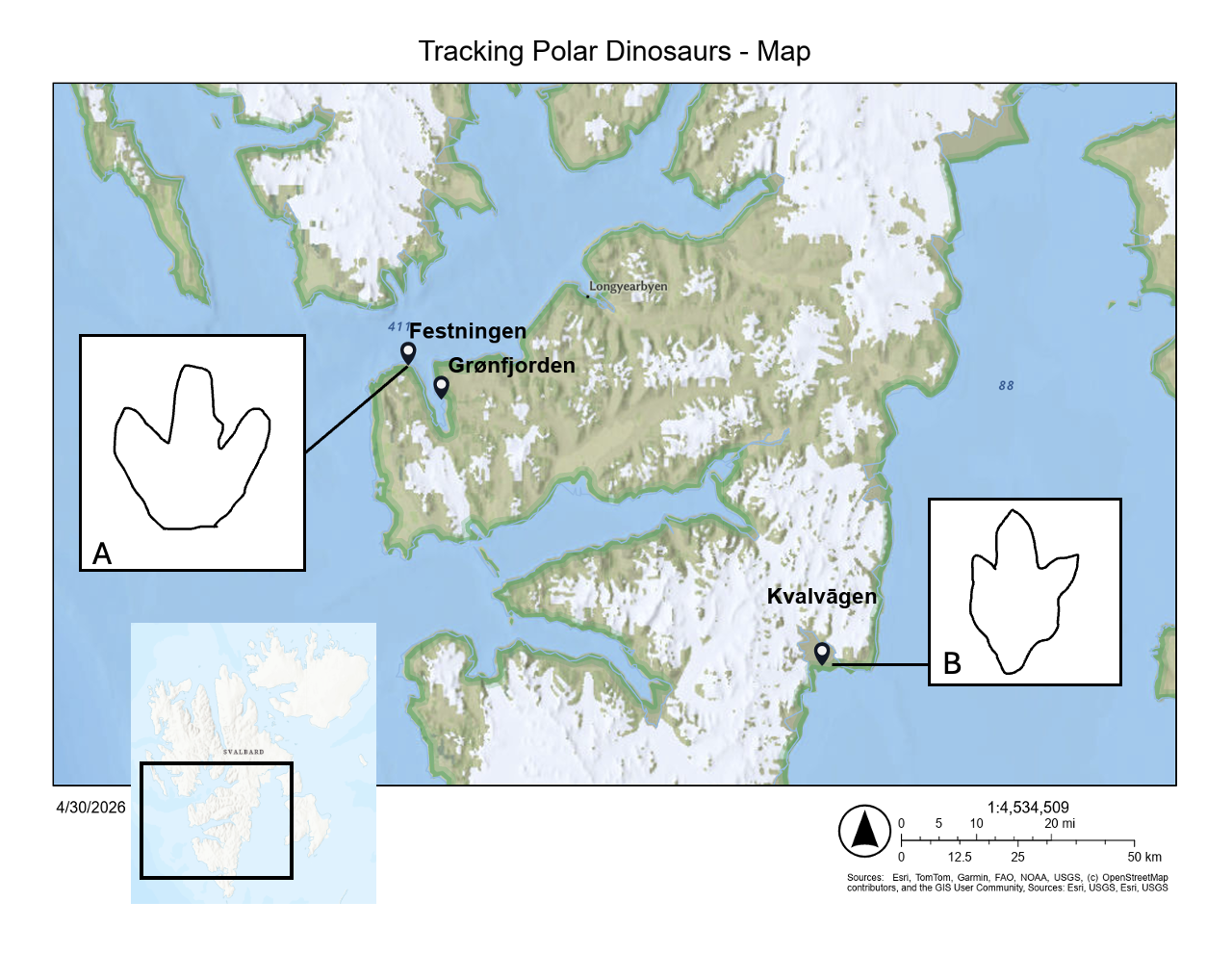
Map of Svalbard showing the two Early Cretaceous tracksites. 1 Ornithopod tracks (Lapparent 1960). 2. Theropod tracks (Edwards et al. 1978) (Alternative theropod tracks were made into the drawing as no photographic or drawn records of the theropod footprints in the Helvetiafjellet Formation are known.) Map made with ArcGIS.

The dinosaurs of the Helvetiafjellet Formation are not normally found as fossils in the limestones; rather, they are discovered as remarkably preserved tracks and footprints. The trackways belong to possible ornithopods and theropods, and are dated to the Cretaceous period, from 145 to 66 million years ago. The trackways were first found in 1960. One species found is the genus Caririchnium; possibly the species C. billsarjeanti and C. burreyi. These are small to medium sized ornithopods, and have been found in North America and Eurasia, and mainly are known from their tracks. These tracks were found in Barremian-layer sandstone caused by the dinosaurs crossing the formation on the Barents Shelf during the Hauterivian-Barremian period (a period in geologic time between 125.77 Ma (million years ago) and 121.4 ± 0.6 Ma), when the formation acted as a land bridge between North America and Eurasia. Another set of tracks, measuring 50-60 centimeters long and with equal width, were found in 2006, and while no proper identification has been named, the tracks used to be thought to belong to Iguanadon for a time. However, actual fossils of other organisms have been found, including marine lizard and fish remains, fossils of plants that show they lived in a humid, warm-temperate climate, and a rare femur from a prehistoric bird has been found, measuring 0.4 cm wide and 4 cm long, was found on Schønrockfjellet on the east coast of Spitsbergen.

== Economic implication ==
In the Early Cretaceous, Svalbard was situated around 63°-66° N as part of a large circum-arctic platform. Fossil records of coniferous trees, dinosaur tracks, ginko trees and bitumenous coal seams suggest warm climate. However, arctic belemnites, glendonite layers and possibly ice rafted debris have been found in the formation which indicate that at least periodically, polar waters intruded the shallow seas covering the archipelago. The strata represent periodic warming and cooling periods that generated eustatic sea-level variations which affected global circulation patters as the shallow seaways were periodically exposed. One episode of cooling was due to the Aptian ocean anoxic event, that was most likely triggered by LIP volcanism of the Ontong Java Plateau and the High Arctic Large Igneous Province. These events caused significant perturbation in the carbon cycle, influencing climatic conditions.

Coal and coaly shale layers are found in the mudstone and siltstone beds of floodplain and interdisciplinary bay deposits. Coal seams were briefly mined at Advent City and Hiorthhamn in Adventfjorden and at Bohemanneser at the Northern shore of Isfjorden (Svalbard) during the early 1900s. Sandstones of the Festningen Member were evaluated to have CO_{2} reservoir and aquifer potential, but the idea was abandoned because the formation is directly connected to the land surface and to fjords. Vitrine reflective analysis of the coal layers yield R% values up to 1.1, with mostly Type III kerogen as the source organism, making the shales a potential source rock. However, there is no current economic interest in mining the coal and shale content of the formation.
