= Hiorth =

Hiorth is a Norwegian surname. Notable people with the surname include:

- Adam Hiorth (1816–1871), Norwegian merchant
- Adam Hiorth (barrister), Norwegian barrister
- Albert Hiorth, Norwegian engineer
- Åse Hiorth Lervik, Norwegian researcher
- Fredrik Hiorth, Norwegian engineer
- Otto Kristian Hiorth, Norwegian physician and politician
