= Harald Throne-Holst =

Norwegian industrial leader and chemical engineer

- Born: 7 December 1905; Kristiania, Norway
- Died: 8 December 1986 (aged 81)
- Occupation: Industrial leader
- Parent: Johan Throne Holst
- Relatives: Henning Throne-Holst (brother)

Harald Throne-Holst (7 December 1905 – 8 December 1986) was a Norwegian industrial leader and a chemical engineer. He was managing director and later chairman of the Freia chocolate factory, and served as President of the Federation of Norwegian Industries and as chairman of Foreningen Norden.

== Career ==
Throne-Holst was born in Kristiania to factory owner Johan Throne Holst and Hanna Richter Jenssen, and was a brother of Henning Throne-Holst. He was managing director of the Freia chocolate factory from 1948 to 1970, and eventually chairman of the board of the company. He chaired Foreningen Norden from 1964 to 1969, and served as president of the Federation of Norwegian Industries from 1969 to 1971.

He was decorated Knight of the Order of St. Olav in 1966, and was a Commander of the Finnish Order of the White Rose. He perished in a fire in 1986.
