= Twist (confectionery) =

Brand of bite-sized confectionery

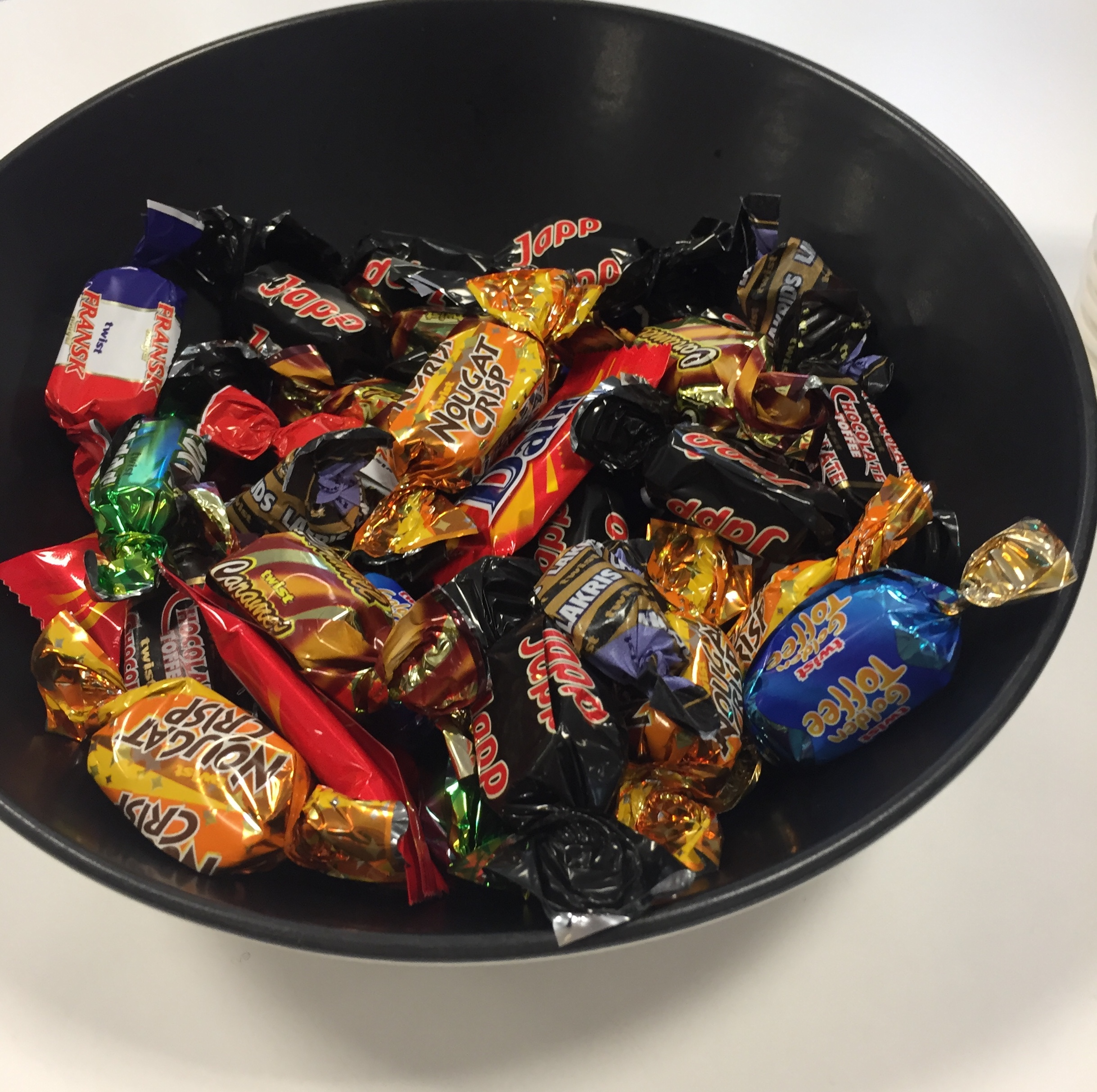
Twist (2017)

Twist is a bite-sized confectionery produced by Freia (owned by Mondelez), primarily for the Scandinavian market. Twist is sold in bags, and each bag contains a variety of pieces, mostly consisting of chocolates with some sort of filling in the center. New pieces are added and old ones discontinued frequently. Only two pieces, Lakris (licorice) and Cocos (coconut-filled chocolate), have existed since the product was launched. The name Twist refers to the way each piece is wrapped.

Twist quickly became popular when it was introduced in Norway in 1957. It was introduced in the other Nordic countries soon thereafter; Sweden in 1958, Denmark in 1963, and Finland in 1964. However, the product is still most popular in its home market: Norwegians consume three times as much Twist as Swedes.

In the mid-1990s, the production of Twist was moved from Freia's factory in Oslo to its sister company Marabou in Sweden.

Twist has many similarities with UK brands Quality Street and Cadbury Roses.
