= Fredrik Hiorth =

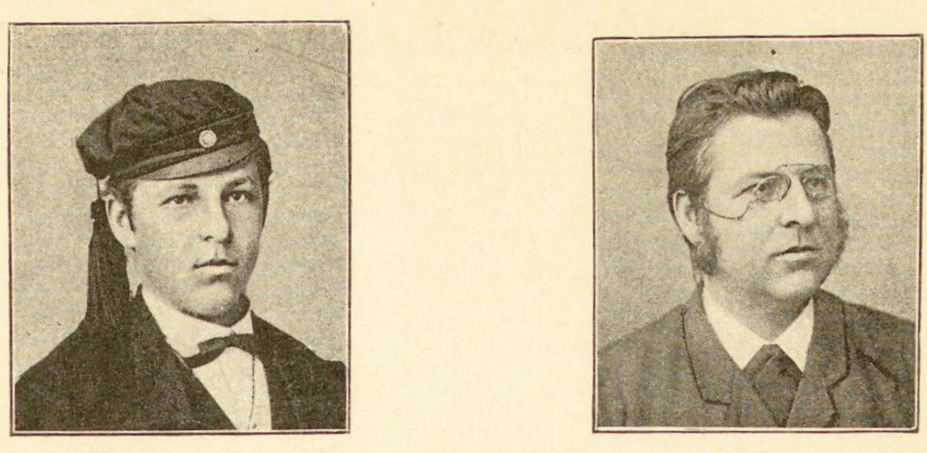
Fredrik Hiorth

Fredrik Wilhelm Louis Hiorth (February 4, 1851 – January 1, 1923) was a Norwegian engineer and industrialist.

== Early life and family ==
Hiorth was born in Aker. He was the son of the sheriff there, Hans Jensenius Hiorth (1808–1902), and his wife Lena Woxen. His father was the brother of the industrialist Adam Hiorth. Fredrik married Thekla Pauline Dahlstrøm (1850–1937), a captain's daughter from Gøteborg, in 1875. Both of them were very religious. Their son Albert Hiorth (1876–1949) was a well-known engineer and a lay preacher that founded several companies.

== Career ==
After passing his examen artium in 1869 and studying engineering at the Chalmers University of Technology in Gothenburg, Sweden, Hiorth worked for the railroad in Eastern Norway until 1880. He purchased the Rodeløkka Iron Foundry (Rodeløkken Jernstøberi) in 1878, when it had only fourteen employees. He headed the company until 1892, when it became part of the Kværner company, where he was a part owner and director until the spring of 1900, when he founded the F. Hiorth Engineering Office together with his son Albert Hiorth. He also assisted his cousin Fredrik Wilhelm Hjorth Christensen (1851–?) in establishing the Freia chocolate factory in 1889.

After ordering a steam- and diesel-powered Dixi automobile in 1900, in 1901 he established the company F. Hiorth’s Automobilforretning (F Hiort Automobile Company) in 1901, which was the first Norwegian company to import cars. He sold the company in 1906 to his assistant Adolf Kristian Kolberg (1874–1955), and the company was renamed Kolberg & Caspary.

Hiorth later operated as a hydropower speculator and power-plant developer. Hiorth was also a main shareholder in the company Bjølvefossen A/S, which he started in 1905 with his son Albert as CEO or administrative director. He contributed to establishing Norsk Hydro in 1905. Hiorth received the Order of St. Olav in 1902. He died in Oslo.

== Legacy ==
The now-abandoned settlement of Hiorthhamn on the island of Spitsbergen is named after Hiorth.
