= Henning Throne-Holst =

Norwegian-Swedish industrialist (1895–1980)

- Born: 25 July 1895; Strinda Municipality in Søndre Trondhjem, Norway.
- Died: 23 March 1980 (aged 84); Stockholm, Sweden
- Occupation: Industrial leader
- Spouse: Gunhild Jenssen (1899-1986)
- Parent: Johan Throne Holst (1868-1946)
- Relatives: Harald Throne-Holst (1905-1996)

Henning Throne-Holst (25 July 1895 – 23 March 1980) was a Norwegian born, Swedish industrialist.

== Biography ==
Throne-Holst was born at Strinda Municipality in Søndre Trondhjem, Norway. He was the son of Johan Throne Holst (1868-1946) and Hanna Richter Jenssen (1873-1952). His father was the founder and CEO of Freia and of Marabou. His brother Harald Throne-Holst (1905-1996) was director and later chairman of the Freia.

He grew up in Kristiania (now Oslo) and graduated from Aars and Voss School in 1913. He attended business school in Berlin and began studying economics at the University of Kristiania. In 1918, he was sent to head the first Swedish chocolate factory, AB Marabou in Sundbyberg outside Stockholm. He was CEO of the Swedish chocolate factory Marabou from 1918 to 1947. Throne-Holst was later CEO of Scania-Vabis and of SAS. He was chairman of the board of Findus from 1941 to 1946, and Freia from 1946 to 1971.

== Personal life ==
In 1923, he married Gunhild Jenssen (1899-1986). He was decorated Knight, First Class of the Order of St. Olav in 1945, and Commander of the Order of Vasa and Order of Dannebrog. His autobiography Mitt livs företag was published during 1973. He died in Stockholm during 1980.

== Other sources ==
- Henning Throne-Holst (1973) Mitt livs företag (Bonnier) ISBN 978-9100385613

Business positions
Preceded by Per Norlin	Chief executive officer of SAS Group; 1955–1957	Succeeded by Åke Rusck
