= Advent City =

Abandoned coal mining settlement in Norway

Coordinates: 78.272°N 15.615°E

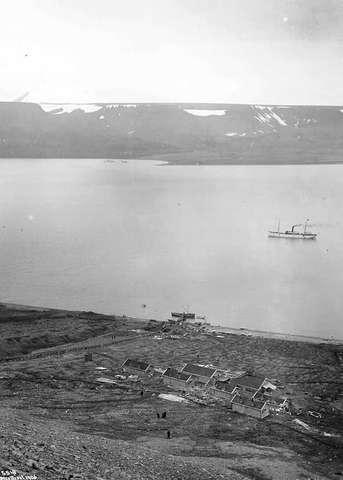
Advent City in 1906

Advent City is an abandoned coal mining settlement located on the east side of Adventfjorden on the island of Spitsbergen in Svalbard, Norway. It was founded in the early 20th century and was the first year-round mining village in Svalbard. The village was situated on a fell field with a High Arctic tundra vegetation grazed by Svalbard reindeer and geese and dominated by mountain avens (Dryas octopetala), polar willow (Salix polaris), mosses and lichens. Today, the mine has caved in and Advent City only consists of ruins, the only visible remains being the building foundations. Most of the former buildings, however, are still present in their original state at Hiorthhamn (Moskushamn). In 2019, a team of archeologists made a 3D reconstruction of Advent City in its heyday.

Advent City was a coal mining camp operated by the Spitzbergen Coal & Trading Co., Ltd, based in Sheffield, United Kingdom. After the discovery of a seam of Early Cretaceous coal in 1901, a coal claim was staked out by the Norwegian A/S Bergen-Spitsbergen Kulgrubekompani. The mining activity started in 1903 and the first structures appeared, which included a small smithy, a kitchen and a mess tent. Additional buildings and structures, including a bakery and two streets, followed in 1905 after the Spitzbergen Coal & Trading Co. had taken over the mine in 1904.

Advent City had c. 100 inhabitants from 1904 to 1908. The small coal mine was, however, unprofitable due to, among other factors, the disappointing quality of the coal, the poor working conditions in an exposed environment, and the differences in language and culture between the British management and the Scandinavian workers. Advent City was abandoned in 1908. Unpaid guards confiscated portable possessions and a neighbouring mine salvaged some machinery and buildings. All remaining buildings were moved to Hiorthhamn in 1916 and 1917.

The human activity at Advent City was short but intensive and with significant local environmental pressure. The settlement and mine changed the local landscape. The inhabitants hunted and fowled, disposed waste, and imported non-native animals and plants. After a hundred years after the abandonment of the settlement and mine, ground clearances, animal dung and waste dumps continue to have an effect on landscape and vegetation. Dung and waste dumps are highly eutrophic and are still unsuitable for liverworts and lichens. A reduction of the natural patchiness of the tundra vegetation can also be observed. However, despite these effects on the vegetation, the impact of Advent City is mainly restricted to the visual impact of its ruins on the landscape.
