= Freia Melkesjokolade =

Chocolate product

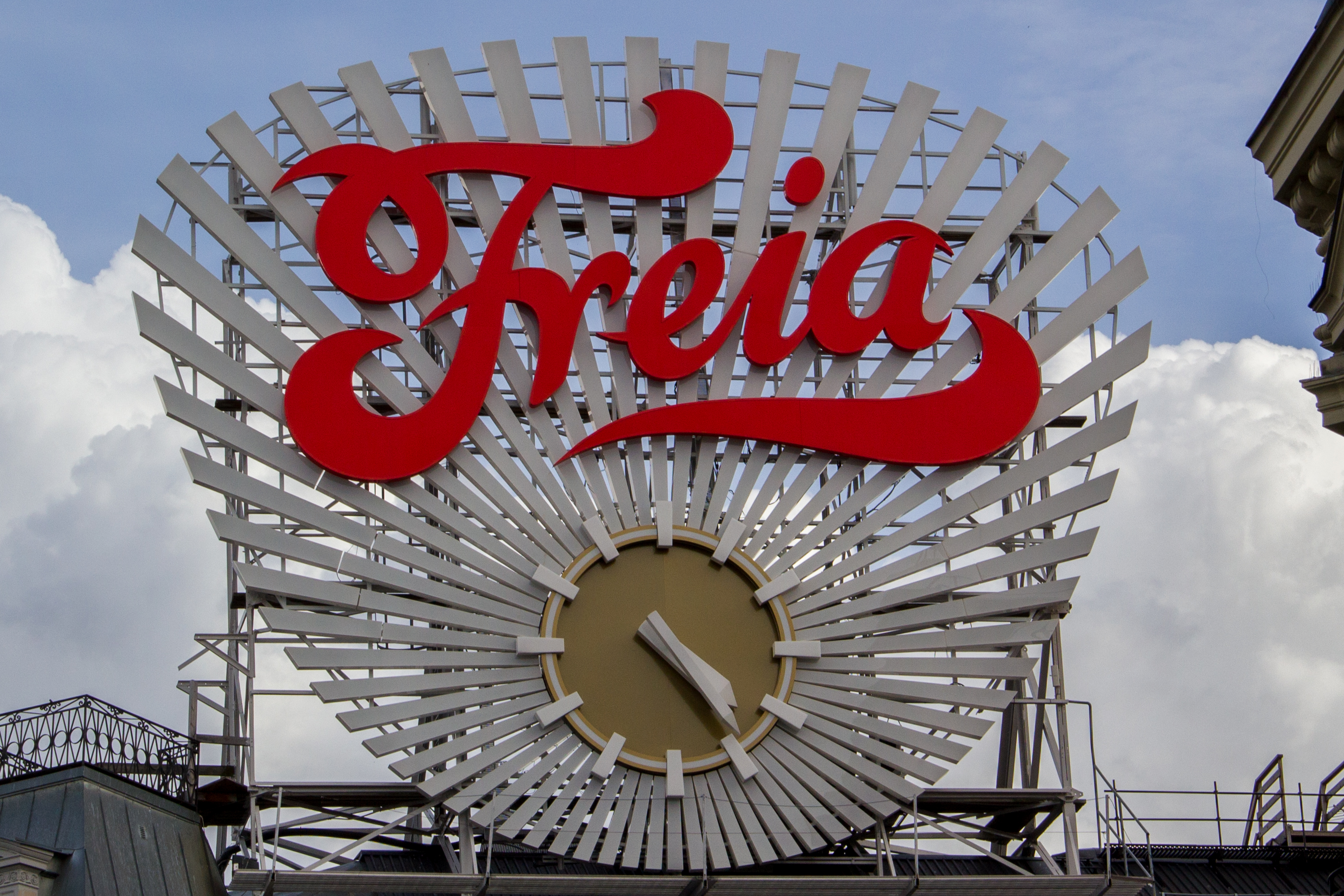
Freia clock at Egertorget square in Oslo

Freia Melkesjokolade (lit. 'Freia milk chocolate') is milk chocolate from the Norwegian chocolate brand Freia and has been the most sold chocolate in Norway since the 1960s. The chocolate was launched in 1906 after a Swiss recipe, originally called 'Freia Melkechokolade'. In the 1920s it was considered ”Europas bedste spisechokolade” (Europe's best dessert chocolate), and people would often add that it was Norwegian, to underline that it was not imported. It was only after the chocolate again became available after World War II, that the name was changed to "Melkesjokolade" (Milk Chocolate) due to the spelling reform of 1939.

Freia melkesjokolade was created in 1905 by the newly hired manager Johan Throne Holst (1868-1946). When he took over management, he realized that there was a potential market for edible milk chocolate, in addition to the dark chocolate and other minor products Freia were producing at the time. It became a success. However, it was not until the 1920s that regular people had the money to buy chocolate, as it was a luxury product at the time. The chocolate is consistently marketed to create national romantic associations - as the essence of everything that is Norwegian.

Based on the Melkesjokolade Freia produces other candy bars containing nuts, extracts from oranges, raisins etc.:

- Firkløver (1926)
- Daim (1953)
- Helnøtt (1958)
- Fruktnøtt (1963)
- Appelsinkrokan (2004)
- Kjekskuler (2005)
- Melkesjokolade with Daim (2007)
- Melkesjokolade with NonStop (2007)
- Walters Mandler (Translates to "Walter's Almonds") (2008)
- Walters No.156 with chili (2011)
