= Marabou (chocolate) =

Swedish chocolate brand

- Logo of Marabou
- Product type: Chocolate
- Current owner: Mondelez International
- Produced by: Mondelez Sweden
- Country: Sweden
- Introduced: 1916
- Markets: Europe, North America, Asia-Pacific
- Previous owners: Freia; Kraft Foods

Marabou is a Swedish chocolate brand owned by Mondelez International.

== History ==
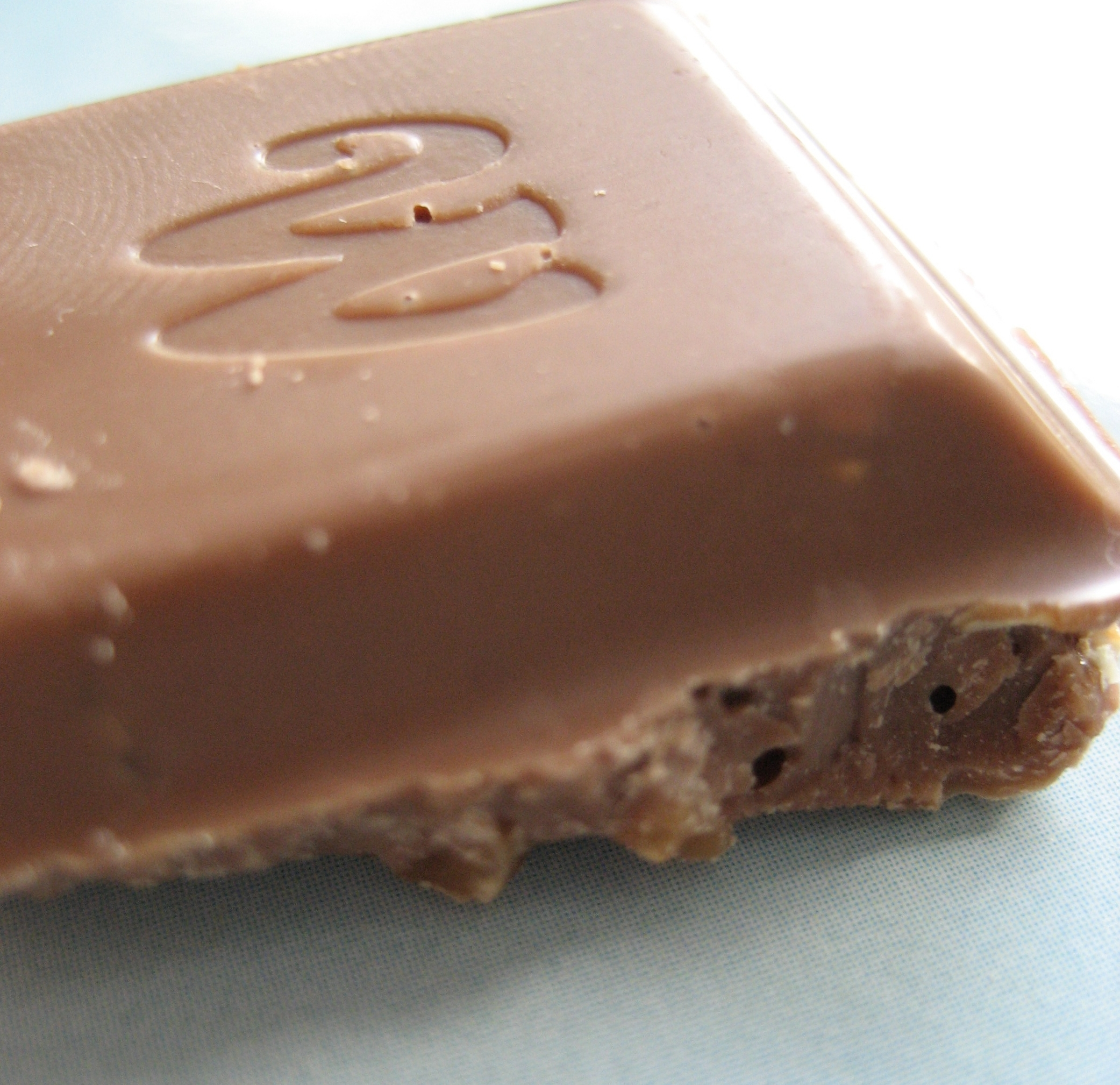
Marabou Daim-chocolate with "M"-logo.

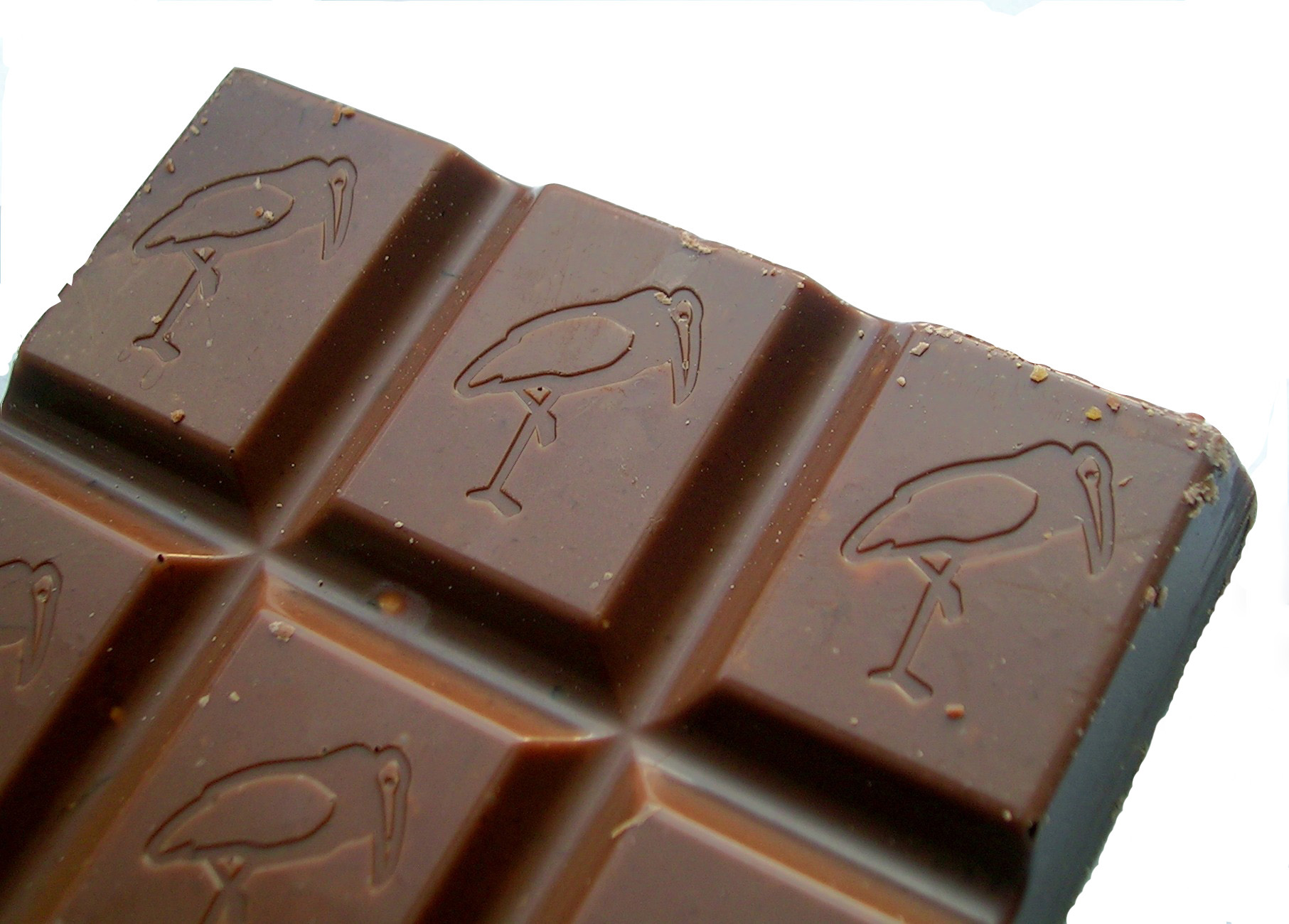
Chocolate with the old Marabou logo used in 1919–1960s, which is still used in Freia

The brand was founded by the Norwegian chocolatier Johan Throne Holst (1868–1946), who already had launched the same chocolate recipe in Norway under the name Freia with great success — in the beginning of the 20th century Freia owned over 50% of the Norwegian market. During the First World War, the continental European markets were closed, so the company decided to expand to Sweden.

In 1916, the brand Marabou was created in Sweden; as the name Freja was already taken in Sweden, the company decided to name their Swedish branch after the stork in the logo. However, the actual production didn't start until 1919 due to shortages in cocoa supply caused by World War I.

Throne Holst's second son, Henning, took over Sweden's first chocolate factory in Sundbyberg, just north of Stockholm, in 1918. He was in charge of creating the brands which are still present today: Japp, Daim, Twist, Fortuna and Non Stop. The first Marabou chocolate to be established was milk chocolate (Mjölkchoklad), which was produced using the same recipe as Freia. From the mid-1950s on, Marabou chocolate was caramelized, which significantly changed its taste. Over time, the Sundbyberg factory was not sufficient for the growing demand, so in the 1970s, production moved, after 60 years in one location, to newly built premises in Upplands Väsby, where it remains today.

At the end of the 1960s, the symbol of Marabou was changed from a stork to the rounded "M" in the company logo. It was designed by Sigvard Bernadotte. This also marked the beginning of the first commercials starring Yvonne Lombard who created the slogan "Mmm... Marabou!". Marabou chocolate is widely available in Sweden in assorted varieties.

Freia and Marabou later merged, and, in 1993, were purchased by Kraft Foods for 3 billion Norwegian kroner. Marabou chocolate is available in a number of European countries and was until September 2011 sold by IKEA in Canada, Israel, and Poland. Marabou chocolate is sold by IKEA in 23 countries: Australia, Austria, Canada, Czechia, Germany, Hungary, Iceland, Japan, Netherlands, Portugal, Russia, Serbia, Slovakia, Spain, Switzerland, Taiwan, Turkey, Ireland, the UAE, the United Kingdom and the US.

== Controversies ==
In 2013, there was press coverage about Marabou's use of palm oil, which, according to Greenpeace, has a negative effect on the animals and people of the world's rain forests. According to the Marabou website (in 2020), Marabou milk chocolate (Mjölkchoklad) does not contain palm oil, but some other products of the company do. The company claims to cover their palm oil demands from a RSPO-certified system since 2013.

=== Report on Russian business dealings ===
In January 2025, Bloomberg noted that Mondelez had removed previous commitments to make its Russian operations independent and that the company had withdrawn profits from Russia during 2024, which should not be possible for an independent company.
