= Bergene =

Oslo-based chocolate and sweets producer

- Founded: 1906
- Founder: Anders Bergene
- Headquarters: Oslo, and Trondheim
- Products: Chocolate and Confectionery

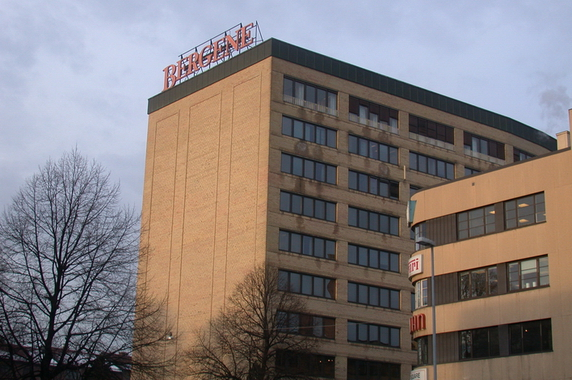
The Bergene factory, which housed Bergene chocolate company until 1990. (Thoresen, Rolf / Oslo byarkiv)

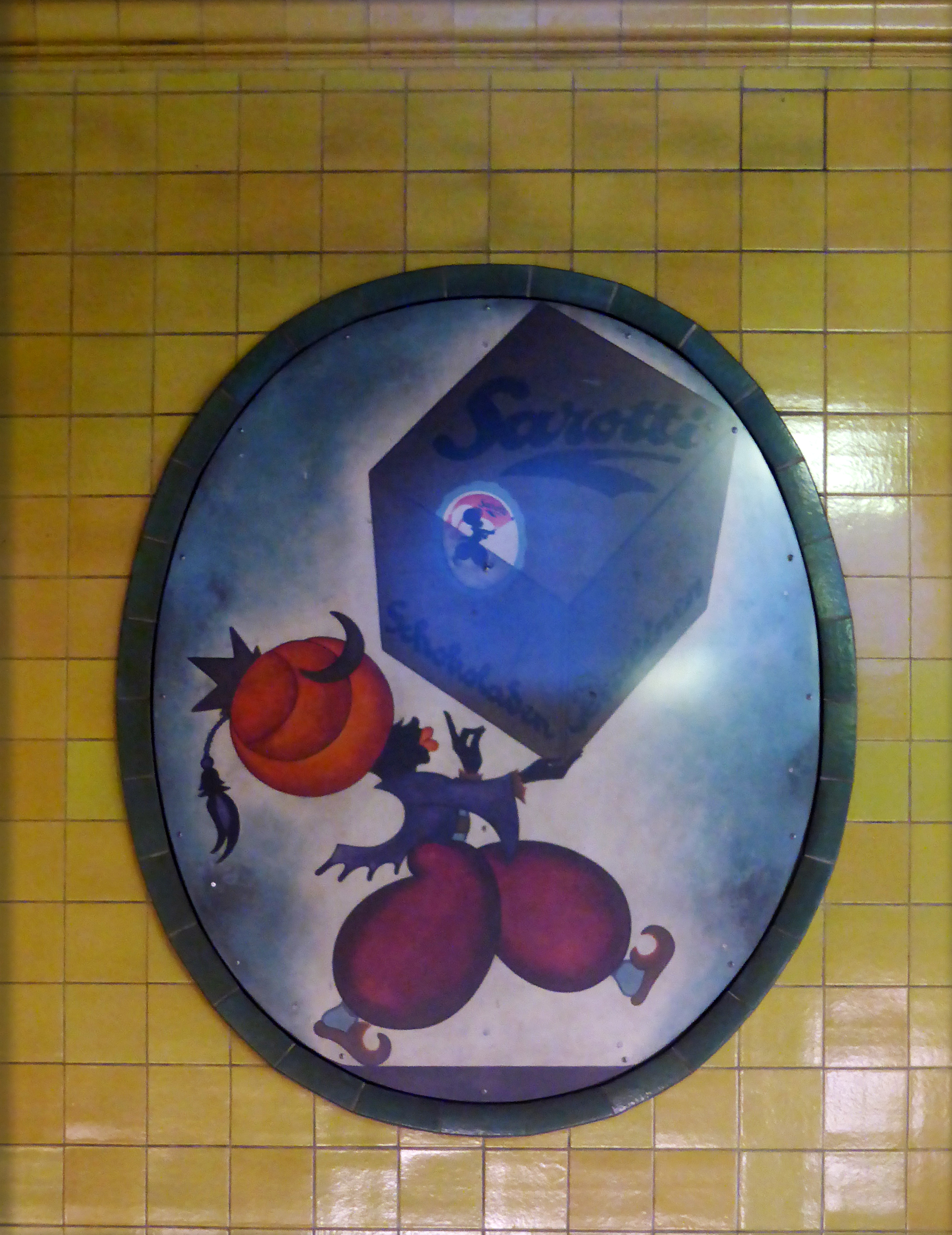
Historic advertising for the Sarotti chocolate company, which sourced professionals from. U-Bahn station at Wittenbergplatz, Berlin.

Bergene (A. Bergene Chokoladefabrik) was a producer of chocolate and other sweets in Oslo. The factory was established by colonial trader Anders Bergene in 1906, when he took over the premises in Københavngata after Olaf Larsens Chokoladefabrik (later ASOLA) moved out, before later being established in Akersbakken.

== First generation: Anders Bergene ==
When it opened on Rodeløkka in 1906, Bergene had 40 employees, but chocolate production was a problem due to steam engines and other equipment often breaking down and needing repairs. Sweets were easier to prepare and saved their sales. Together with his German-speaking manager, Bergene went to Berlin and poached two professionals from the famous Sarotti chocolate factory. Bergene opened a shop in Karl Johans gate 18. He had little faith in advertising. He believed that a good product would succeed because people would talk about it. One of the two German professionals became head of the Peuker factory, while Haase took care of filled confectionery. However, sweets producer Pedersen was Norwegian.

The company used the slogan: "Altid no' godt fra Bergene" for many years, and at its peak produced more than 500 different products. Spinach and pea soup were produced in blocks. In 1915, Gullbrød was launched with 3% bitter almond for its characteristic marzipan flavour, in 1917, Mokkabønner, and in 1920 Vaniljepraliner, while in 1961 Kremtopper was launched. During the First World War, a ship carrying cacao beans from England was torpedoed. Without the raw materials for the factory, production ceased and workers were laid off.

== Second generation: Alf Bergene ==
In 1919, Anders Bergene handed over the company to his son Alf, who replaced horses and carts with electric vans. The stables and wagon sheds became production sites. On a group trip to Germany in 1925, Alf Bergene bought the recipe for the caramel Smørbukk and brought it into production in 1935.

The working conditions were miserable, with low wages, a 12-hour working day, Sundays until 2, and mandatory overtime. Holidays, lunch breaks, and uniforms did not exist. The white work clothes were expected to be taken home on Sundays and washed themselves ready for Monday. Office workers ranked well above factory floor workers. One office worker asked out a factory girl, and was called in to see a manager for doing so. He was advised that if he did it again, his parents would be notified, or he would be sacked. An automatic control system was in place to check workers at the end of the day. If the light was white, workers could go through. If the light was red, bags and coats were searched for stolen goods.

During the Second World War, raw materials were scarce again. Bergene employed farmers in Vestfold to grow sugar beet, which was used for "emergency confectionery", and the dessert jelly Aroma was made from alginate, and had to be eaten soon after production, or it would melt into a puddle. Bergenes production of chocolate went to the Frontkjemper office.

== Third generation: Anders and Gunnar Bergene ==
In 1955, the brothers Anders and Gunnar Bergene took over. They wanted to build a sky scraper between Københavngata and Fagerheimgata. This collided with Oslo Municipality's building regulations, which since the 1920s had planned a green corridor from Grefsenåsen down through Torshovdalen, Sofienbergparken and Københavngata to Akerselva. The new building would be in the middle of this corridor, but the brothers gave the municipality an ultimatum: Allow the highrise, or production would be moved to Trondheim. The municipality gave in to save jobs, and the new building was built in 1967.

In the 1970s, the company also became established in Sweden, under the name Bergene Dragé. In 1980, the firm joined with Nidar in Trondheim, and for some years was known as Nidar-Bergene. In 1987, the company was bought by Nora Industrier (part of Orkla ASA), and Nidar became the company name. In 1990, all production moved to Trondheim, and the nameplate on the factory building in Oslo is all that remains.
