= Per Norlin =

Swedish businessman

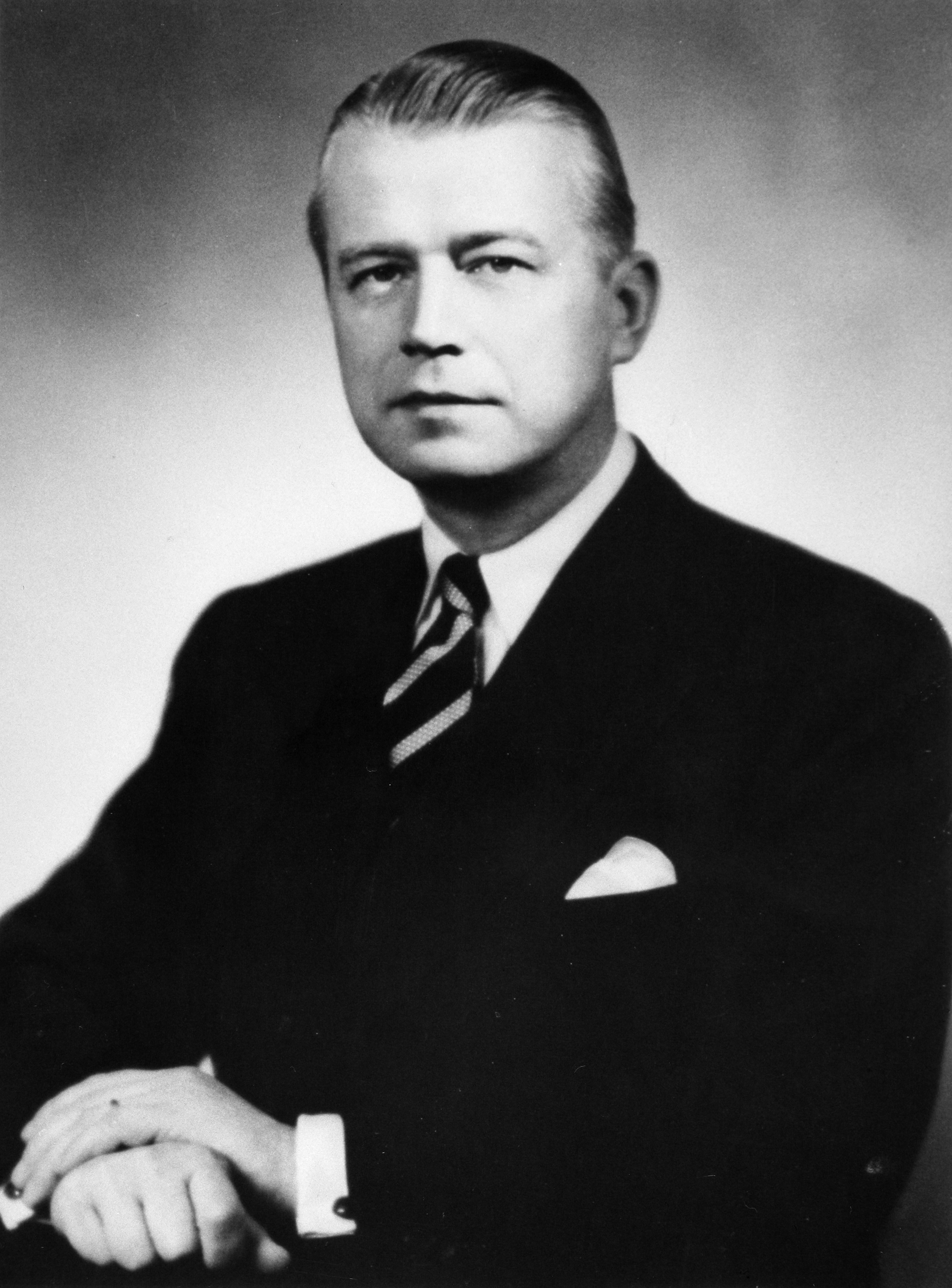
Per Norlin

Per Adolf Norlin (23 January 1905 – 11 January 1992) was a Swedish businessman. He was CEO of Swedish Intercontinental Airlines (SILA), Scandinavian Airlines (SAS) and AB Aerotransport (ABA).

== Career ==
Norlin was born on 23 January 1905 in Stockholm, Sweden, the son of Karl Norlin, an office manager, and his wife Ingrid (née Söderman). He passed studentexamen in 1924.

== Career ==
Norlin was CEO of the Swedish Intercontinental Airlines (SILA) from 1943 to 1949. Norlin served as CEO of Scandinavian Airlines (SAS) from 1946 to 1949, vice CEO of AB Aerotransport (ABA) in 1948 and CEO of ABA from 1949 to 1951. He was CEO of SAS from 1951 to 1954 and of SILA from 1955 to 1984. Norlin was also director in the Axel Johnson Group from 1955 to 1980.

Norlin was deputy member of the board of the AB Aerotransport (ABA) from 1931 to 1935, board member of ABA and SAS from 1955, vice chairman of the Royal Swedish Aero Club from 1955, chairman of the board of AB Linjebuss from 1955, of Arvid Nordquist HAB from 1956, International Aircraft Leasing Co Inc from 1956, AB Lindholmens varv from 1961, vice chairman of Nynäs petroleum from 1957, and board member of Motala Verkstad from 1957. He was also a board member of the Rederi AB Nordstjernan from 1963 and chairman of the board of the Maritime Museum.

== Personal life ==
In 1933, Norlin married Eva de Champs (1905–1989), the daughter of Lieutenant General Henri de Champs and Adelaide (née von Horn). He was the father of Eva (born 1939), Christoffer (born 1941) and Malcolm (born 1947).

== Death ==
Norlin died on 11 January 1992 and was buried on 27 March 1992 at Norra begravningsplatsen in Stockholm.

== Awards and decorations ==
Norlin's awards:

- Commander First Class of the Order of Vasa
- Commander of the Order of the Dannebrog
- Commander of the Order of the Lion of Finland
- Commander of the Order of Orange-Nassau
- Officer of the Order of the Crown
- Knight First Class of the Order of the White Rose of Finland
- Knight First Class of the Order of St. Olav
- Officer of the Legion of Honour

Business positions
Preceded by None	Chief executive officer of SAS Group; 1946–1948	Succeeded by Per Møystad Backe
Preceded by Per Møystad Backe	Chief executive officer of SAS Group; 1951–1954	Succeeded by Henning Throne-Holst
