= Anders Bergene =

Norwegian businessman (1855–1920)

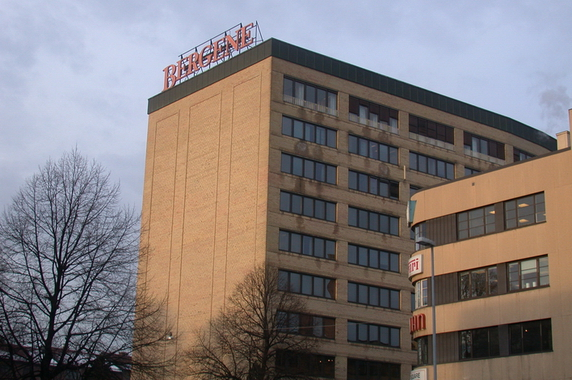
Bergene factory at Rodeløkka in Oslo Norway

Anders Edvard Olsen Bergene (16 June 1855 – 18 August 1920) was a Norwegian businessperson. He founded the chocolate and confectionery company Bergene.

Bergene was born in Hedrum Municipality in Vestfold, Norway. He was the son of Ole Kristian Hansen (1828-1900) and Edel Marie Andersdatter. He departed early from home, first to Skien, then at age 20 to Kristiania (now Oslo), where he had several positions with retail stores, including with merchant F. H. Dethloff. He worked as a wholesaler under the trade name A. Bergene Colonial en Gros from 1882 and from 1890 he also sold candy and peppermint lozenges.

In 1906, he acquired the firm of A/S Olaf Larsens Chocoladefabrik. He expanded the operation to establish A. Bergene Chokoladefabrik, a chocolate factory in the neighborhood of Rodeløkka. The confectionery quickly became one of the leaders in Norway with large range of chocolate and candy products. In 1919, one year before his death, the ownership was transferred to his son Alf Bergene (1887-1967). The company became a limited company in 1961 under the trade name Bergene A/S which merged with Nidar A/S in 1980.

In 1987 Nidar was bought by Nora Industrier and in 1992, the company became part of Orkla Group.
