= Åke Rusck =

Swedish businessman

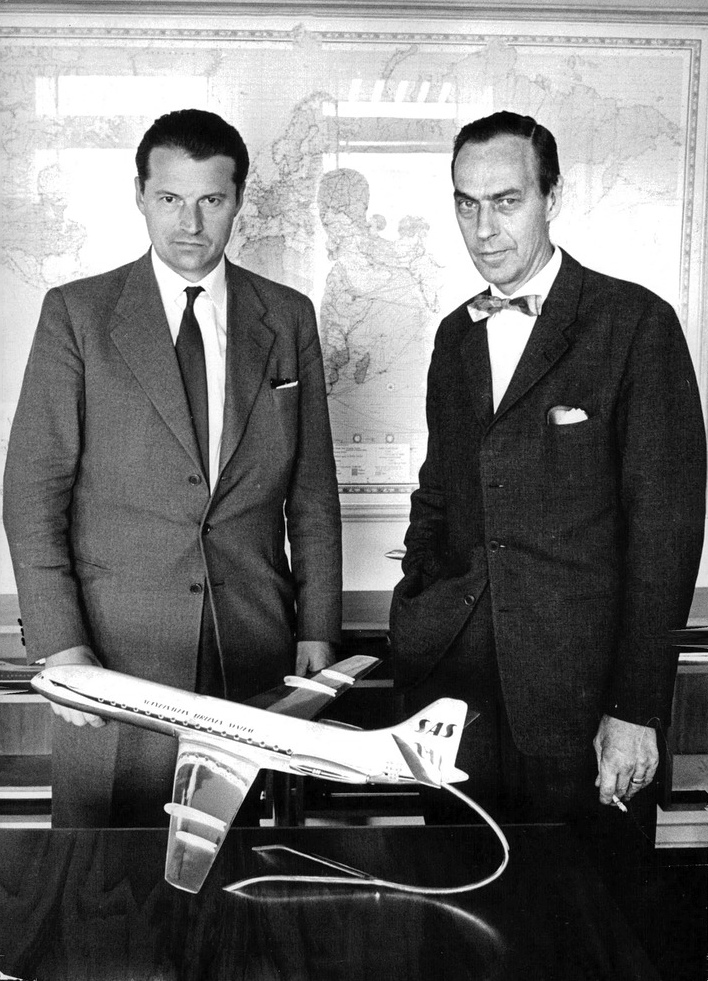
Åke Rusck and Curt Nicolin in deliberations regarding SAS, 1961.

John Åke J:son Rusck (9 August 1912 – 24 September 1978) was a Swedish businessman.

He was CEO of Sweden's major state hydro power company Vattenfall between 1948 and 1957 and then CEO of the SAS Group from 1958 to 1961.

He was elected a member of the Royal Swedish Academy of Engineering Sciences in 1950.

Business positions
Preceded by Henning Throne-Holst	Chief executive officer of SAS Group; 1958–1961	Succeeded by Curt Nicolin
