= Kvikk Lunsj =

Norwegian brand of chocolate bar

A Kvikk Lunsj bar in its wrapper

Kvikk Lunsj (transl. Quick Lunch) is the name of a chocolate bar by the Norwegian chocolate sweets manufacturing company Freia, launched in 1937 and sold ever since, apart from a break during and after the Second World War. Between 1941 and 1949, its production was halted due to a sugar shortage and the lack of quality flour. The chocolate consists of four rectangular wafers covered in milk chocolate, with thinner layers of filler made from ground-up discarded wafers and bars mixed with chocolate that is put between wafers to break the chocolate into pieces more easily. The chocolate has been advertised as a "hiking chocolate", and it is often associated with skiing trips in Norwegian culture, especially during Easter vacation, where chocolate is usually eaten to provide extra energy in packed lunches. Kvikk Lunsj is owned and produced by Mondelez International and sold in Norway and Sweden.

The average Norwegian eats about nine Kvikk Lunsj bars a year, four of them over Easter. Around fifty million bars are made annually, and between 400 and 500 tonnes are sold at Easter. Some sales come from duty-free shops in Sweden.

Freia replaced the bar's foil wrapper with airtight packaging in 2005, bringing it into line with its other chocolate products; the previous packaging had been largely unchanged since 1938, and the change was opposed by customers online. In the 1960s, Freia began printing the well known Fjellvettreglene (transl. The Mountain Code) on the back of the packaging.

== Variants ==
The chocolate is also sold in larger chocolate bars as Kvikk Lunsj XXL. Kvikk Lunsj has also been sold in blueberry and orange flavours. The chocolate has otherwise remained unchanged from the original. The first chocolates produced were covered in dark chocolate, which performed poorly in the market. The product was almost entirely removed from the market until it was reintroduced with milk chocolate. Another variation are the Kvikk Lunsj Biter, released by Freia in 2025. These bite sized, cube-shaped pieces feature a hint of salt and offer a departure from the traditional four-finger bar format.

== Kit Kat ==
Kit Kat is similar to Kvikk Lunsj. Kit Kat is a chocolate product sold internationally and was introduced in English markets by Rowntree Limited as "Rowntree's Chocolate Crisp" as early as 1935. This company was bought by Nestlé in 1988. In 2006, Nestlé was granted a trademark on the "four-fingered wafer shape" by the European Union Intellectual Property Office. However, in July 2018, the trademark was determined inadmissible by the Court of Justice of the European Union.

== See also ==
- Mondelez International
- Nestlé
