= Curt Nicolin =

Swedish businessman (1921–2006)

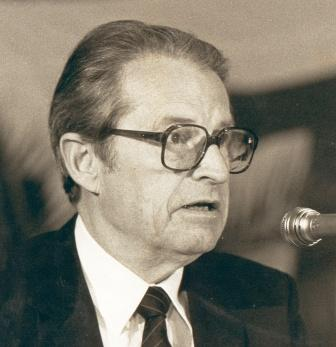
- Born: Curt René Nicolin; 10 March 1921; Stockholm, Sweden
- Died: 8 September 2006 (aged 85); Stockholm, Sweden
- Education: Royal Institute of Technology
- Occupations: Businessman, engineer
- Spouse: Ulla-Britt Sandén (m. 1946)
- Children: 5

Curt René Nicolin (10 March 1921 – 8 September 2006) was a Swedish businessman. He served as the chairman of ASEA and the Swedish Employers Association.

== Early life ==
Nicolin was born on 10 March 1921 in Stockholm, Sweden, the son of Felix Nicolin and his wife Anna Lisa (née Rehné). He passed studentexamen at Sigtunaskolan Humanistiska Läroverket in 1941 and graduated from the Royal Institute of Technology in 1945.

== Career ==
Nicolin was recruited by the Wallenberg family as an engineer at Svenska Turbinfabriks AB Ljungström (STAL) in Finspång the same year, to lead the development of a Swedish jet engine. He got acquainted with Fredrik Ljungström, thanks to whom he debuted at the Nobel Banquet, and for whom he later authored an obituary.

Nicolin became vice CEO and technical manager there in 1953. Nicolin was CEO of STAL from 1955 to 1959 and of Turbin AB de Laval Ljungström from 1959 to 1961. In 1961, the Wallenberg family appointed Nicolin as CEO of ASEA, the crown jewel in the Swedish engineering industry. At the same time, the Wallenberg's lent him to clean up the loss-making airline Scandinavian Airlines (SAS) as its CEO from 1961 to 1962. Back at ASEA he took the task of decentralizing the hierarchically-built old engineering company and dividing it into divisions. It was during a period when the new semiconductor technique increased in importance. During Nicolin's time at ASEA, the decision on the Swedish nuclear light-water reactors came. ASEA came to build nine of the twelve Swedish reactors and also two Finnish.

Nicolin was in the 1960s a board member of ASEA, SAS, Swedish Intercontinental Airlines (SILA), Incentive AB, AB C E Johansson, Swedish Employers Association and the Swedish Mechanical Association (Sveriges Mekanförbund). In 1976, Marcus Wallenberg Jr. retired from the position of chairman of ASEA and the post was transferred to Nicolin. Nicolin was also chairman of the board of the Swedish Employers Association from 1976 to 1984. At ASEA together with the new CEO since 1980, Percy Barnevik, Nicolin participated in the preparations for the big merger with the Swiss Brown, Boveri & Cie. Nicolin was its chairman until the merger in 1991, the same year he became honorary chairman. After ASEA's merger with Brown, Boveri & Cie, Nicolin was chairman of the board of ABB Asea Brown Boveri from 1988 to 1991. He was also chairman of the Business and Industry Advisory Committee at OECD (BIAC) from 1984 and chairman of the board of ESAB AB, Fläkt AB and SILA. Furthermore, Nicolin was Swedish chairman of the board of SAS from 1973 to 1991, vice chairman of AB Aerotransport's working committee and of Swedish Match as well as board member of a number of Swedish and foreign companies and organisations.

== Personal life ==
In 1946, Nicolin married Ulla-Britt Sandén (born 1924), the daughter of merchant Fridolf Sandén and Svea (née Johansson). He was the father of Clas (born 1948), Marie (born 1951), Tomas (born 1954), Magnus (born 1956) and Charlotte (born 1958).

== Awards and decorations ==
=== Swedish ===
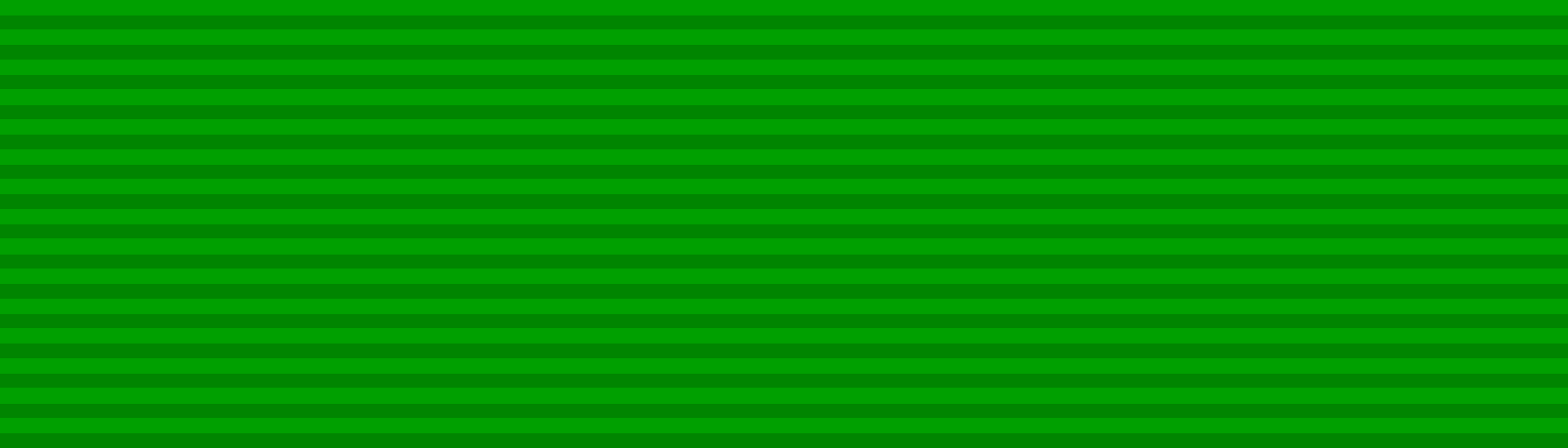
- (Sweden) Commander 1st Class of the Order of Vasa (3 December 1974)
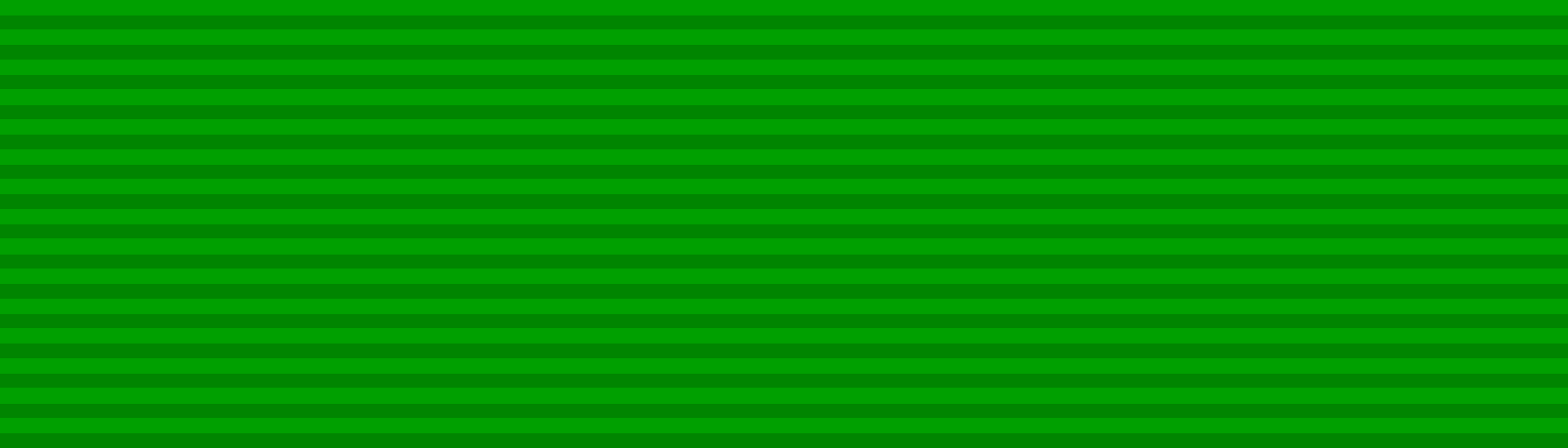
- (Sweden) Commander of the Order of Vasa
- (Sweden) Royal Swedish Academy of Engineering Sciences's Gold Medal (1953)
- (Sweden) Flygtekniska Föreningens Thulin's Silver Medal (1953)

=== Foreign ===
- (Portugal) Grand Cross of the Order of Entrepreneurial Merit, Category of Industrial Merit (11 December 1990)

== Honours ==
- Member of the Royal Swedish Academy of Engineering Sciences (1955)
- Technology Honorary Doctorate, Royal Institute of Technology (1974)
- Member of the Royal Swedish Academy of Sciences (1985)
- First honorary member of the Royal Swedish Academy of Engineering Sciences (1989)
- Honorary Doctor of Business, Stockholm School of Economics (1991)

Business positions
Preceded by Åke Rusck	Chief executive officer of SAS Group; 1961–1962	Succeeded by Karl Nilsson
