= Per Møystad Backe =

Norwegian jurist and industrial leader

- Born: 2 December 1914; Hammerfest
- Died: 19 August 1991 (aged 76)
- Occupations: Jurist and industrial leader
- Awards: Order of St. Olav

Per Møystad Backe (2 December 1914 – 19 August 1991) was a Norwegian jurist and industrial leader. He was born in Hammerfest. He was a central person in the development of the Scandinavian Airlines from 1946. From 1959 to 1968 he was manager of Dalen Portland Cementfabrik. He chaired the board of Norcem from 1968 to 1983, as well as Viking–Askim from 1970. He was decorated Knight, First Class of the Order of St. Olav in 1971.

Business positions
Preceded by Per Norlin	Chief executive officer of SAS Group; 1949–1951	Succeeded by Per Norlin
