= Concession laws =

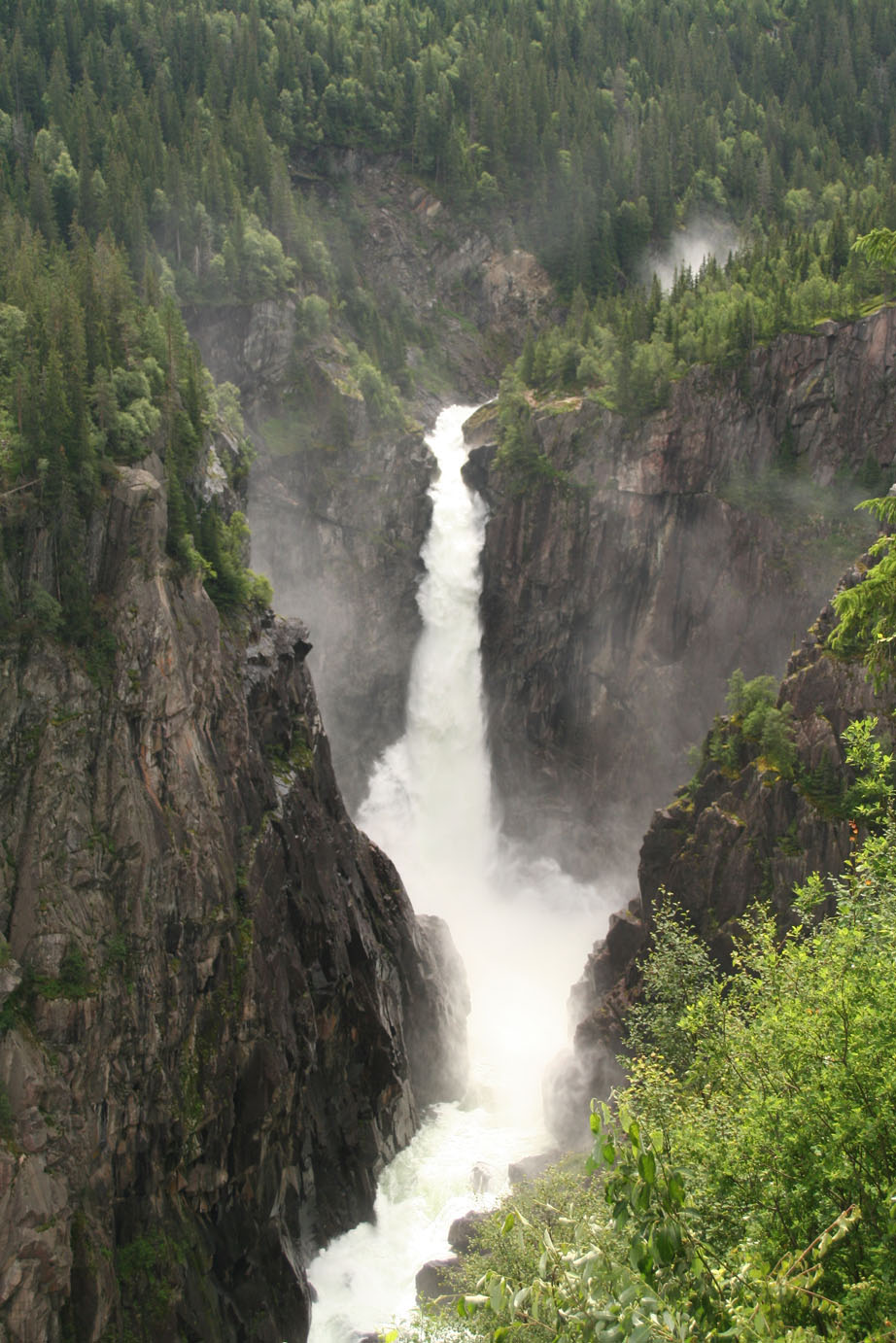
Rjukan Falls, one of the watercourses whose acquisition for 500 kroner was disputed at the time and led to the concession laws

The concession laws (Norwegian: Konsesjonslovene) is a term for acts that were first passed by the Norwegian Storting in 1906 (also known as the "panic laws", Norwegian: panikklover, expanded in 1909 and 1917) that greatly regulated access to the acquisition of watercourses in Norway. Terms of escheat were incorporated into the concession law of September 18, 1909 on the acquisition of waterfalls, mines, and so on, and were continued in the industrial concession law ratified in 1917. Reversion to the state through escheat ensured that water rights in private hands would eventually become subject to public ownership.

The concession laws were adopted after a lengthy political struggle and were intended to prevent large foreign companies from buying up and controlling hydropower and other Norwegian natural resources. Norwegian politicians that were particularly strongly engaged in creating the concession laws included Gunnar Knudsen from the Liberal Party and Johan Castberg from the Radical People's Party.

== Background ==
The concession laws were a dominant topic in Norwegian politics from the dissolution of the union between Norway and Sweden in 1905 to the First World War. The issue created government crises and led to political splits. The underlying cause was major technological changes, industrial growth, and hydropower plants that saw their first major expansion. Increasingly more people became aware that waterfalls and rivers, referred to as "white coal" (Norwegian: hvitt kull), could be developed to produce electricity. Opportunities for major industry based on hydropower created prospects for quick profits. Rural people were largely unaware of these new innovations. Merchants traveled around the country, buying up water rights on a grand scale. They were often referred to as "hydropower speculators" (Norwegian: fossespekulanter) because most of them purchased simply to resell at a profit. Those buying the water rights were often backed by foreign investors. In 1906, over three-quarters of the waterfalls that had been developed were foreign-owned. Water resources director Gunnar Sætren was also connected with waterfall speculation and was extensively criticized for having given a map of the catchment areas in Norway to Swedish capital interests, as a result of which he left his position in 1907.

There was little capital in Norway for large-scale investments, and the new industries were both capital-intense and research-driven. Such development seemed daunting in the political environment in Norway; everything happened quickly and the changes seem profound. The so-called "panic law"—a provisional concession law that was adopted in 1906—was intended to establish a system of control for each individual acquisition. Foreigners and corporations had to be granted a "concession" (i.e., the consent of the Norwegian government) to purchase development rights. In 1907, a proposal for permanent legislation was presented, introducing the principle of escheat. The development of natural resources in private hands was to revert to the state free of charge after a period of 60 to 80 years, with no other form of compensation to the owners.

The political struggle over escheat was difficult. One central point of contention regarding reversion of ownership to the state was unconstitutional encroachment on private ownership. The law gave no preferential treatment to Norwegian companies, although some argued that it should. The law placed foreign and Norwegian stakeholders on an equal footing. All parties were required to allow the Norwegian authorities to act as an intermediary in the public interest that could impose conditions on the acquisition of natural resources. Only the state itself, municipalities, or Norwegian citizens (not corporations) were permitted to buy waterfalls without a concession. Undertakings in which at least two-thirds of the capital was publicly owned were able to obtain a concession in perpetuity. The industrial concession law and watercourse law of 1917 strengthened the authorities' control. In addition to conditions stipulating a maximum limitation of 60 years, reversion to the state, and obligatory surrender of control to municipalities, the provisions also specified direct economic benefits to the municipalities and the state in the form of licensing fees. The concession laws ensured that local power development would come under national control. The laws thus affected the ownership structure in the hydropower sector not only between Norwegian and foreign companies, but also between private and public investors.
