= Daim bar =

Brand of candy bar

Daim

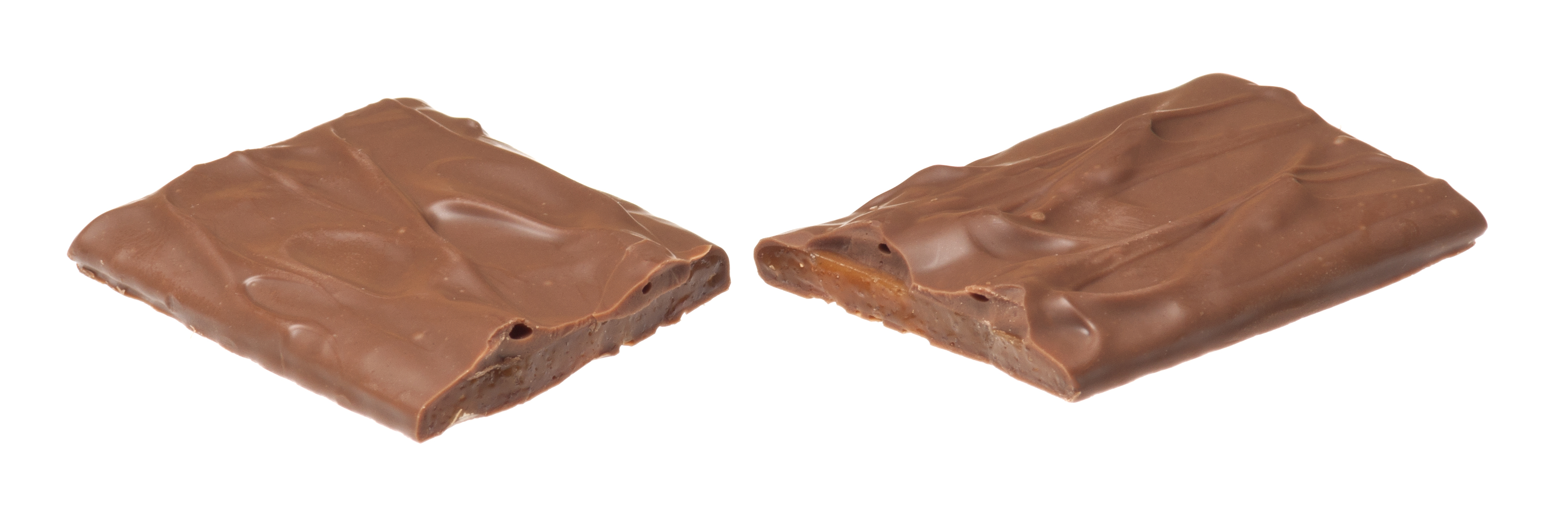
- A Daim wrapper and a split Daim bar
- Product type: Confectionery
- Current owner: Mondelez International (2012)
- Country: Sweden
- Introduced: 1952; 74 years ago
- Related brands: List of Kraft brands
- Markets: Worldwide
- Previous owners: Marabou (1952); Freia (1953); Kraft (1990)
- Website: mondelezinternational.com

A Daim bar (/ˈdaɪm/ DYME) is a Swedish chocolate bar made from crunchy almond caramel covered in milk chocolate.

== Creation ==
Daim was created by Marabou in Sweden in the 1950s. Marabou originally wanted to produce a version of the American Heath Co.'s bar; its vice president Lars Anderfelt inquired about licensing Heath's exact recipe. The Heath Co. refused but gave Anderfeldt a list of their ingredients. From this, Marabou created their own recipe, testing it in Stockholm in 1952 with great success. It was launched under the name Dajm throughout Sweden and Norway the next year, Finland in 1963, and Denmark in 1971. The name originated as a Norwegian phonetic version of the US ten cent “dime”. It was renamed "Daim" in most countries in 1990, although it continued to be marketed in the United Kingdom and Ireland as Dime. The brand was purchased by the American company Kraft Foods in 1993 and is now held by Mondelez International, which Kraft spun off in 2012.

A famous 1995 television commercial (directed by John Lloyd) for the chocolate bar in the United Kingdom featured the comedian Harry Enfield, in which a salesman describes the Dime bar as "smooth on the outside, crunchy on the inside", while a customer says he prefers armadillos, which are "smooth on the inside, crunchy on the outside." Another successful commercial campaign was launched in 1996, and featured a spoof of Raiders of the Lost Ark. An unnamed adventurer uses a Dime bar to avoid triggering a death trap in an ancient temple, only to then return for the chocolate bar and take his chances with the crumbling structure. In 2005, the spelling in the UK and Ireland was changed to "Daim", in line with the rest of the world.

In 2007, a 'Limited Edition Cappuccino' Daim bar was released. A limited edition forest fruit bar has also been released, as well as Coke Daim, white chocolate Daim, dark chocolate Daim, blueberry Daim, lemon-orange Daim and mint Daim. An orange chocolate Daim was sold in the UK and Ireland in winter 2023. As of March 2023, limited-edition caramel latte Daim bars were available in multi-packs in the UK, as well as a Strawberry variant which was released in early 2024. Daim bars imported from Sweden (manufactured in Upplands Väsby) have been sold in many countries.

Since the early 2000s, McDonald's McFlurry is available with Daim in France.

In 2023, IKEA announced it would no longer stock Mondelez International products, including Daim. As opposed to joining dozens of Scandinavian companies that cut ties with Mondelez over the tax it paid to the Russian government, IKEA cited the decision was made as they are focusing on Ikea-branded confectionery products and have further developed their own chocolate and confectionery products.

== See also ==
- List of almond dishes
