= Hiorthhamn =

Abandoned settlement in Svalbard, Norway

Coordinates: 78.273°N 15.705°E

- Abandoned settlement
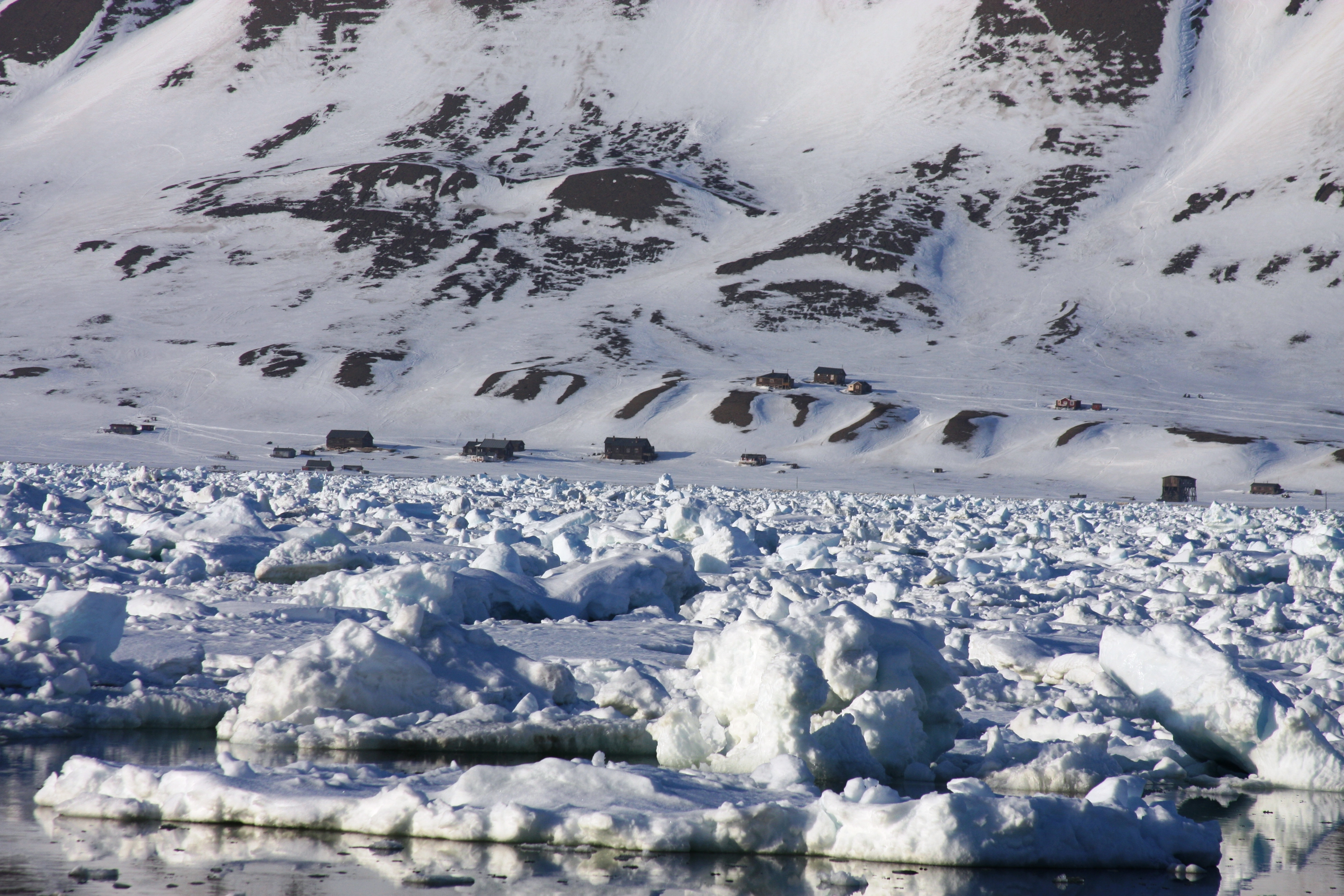

- Location in Svalbard
- Coal mining camp: 1917
- Founder: Fredrik Hiorth (1851–1923)

Hiorthhamn is an abandoned settlement located on the east side of Adventfjorden on the island of Spitsbergen in Svalbard, Norway. It served as a coal mining camp from 1917 to 1921 operated by De Norske Kullfelter Spitsbergen. The settlement was named for the company's director, Fredrik Hiorth (1851–1923). Muskox were introduced in the area from Greenland in 1929, and the camp took the name Moskushamn in 1938. It reverted to its original name in 2002. It has a population of 0 people.
