= Adventfjorden =

Bay on the west coast of Spitsbergen in Svalbard

Coordinates: 78°10′N 15°40′E

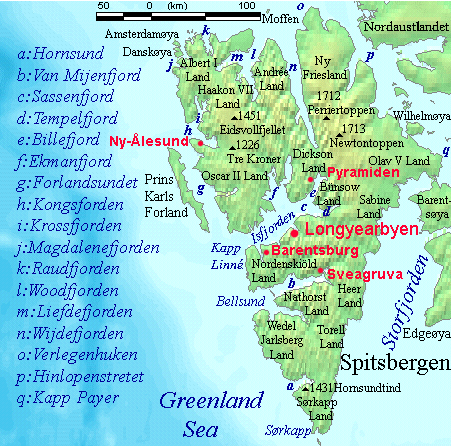
Adventfjorden lies on the southern side of Isfjorden on Spitsbergen's west coast.

Adventfjorden (Advent Bay) is a 7 km long and 4 km wide bay running south-eastwards from the southern side of Isfjorden, on the west coast of Spitsbergen in Svalbard. The name represents a corruption of Adventure Bay - probably named after the Hull-built whaleship Adventure, which operated in Isfjorden in 1656. The fjord was originally known as Klass Billen Bay. At the head of Adventfjorden is Adventdalen (Advent Valley).

The former mining-camp of Longyearbyen (now Svalbard's main town) lies on the fjord's southwestern shore, while another former mining-camp, Hiorthhamn, is located on its northeastern shore.

== Gallery ==
Adventfjorden

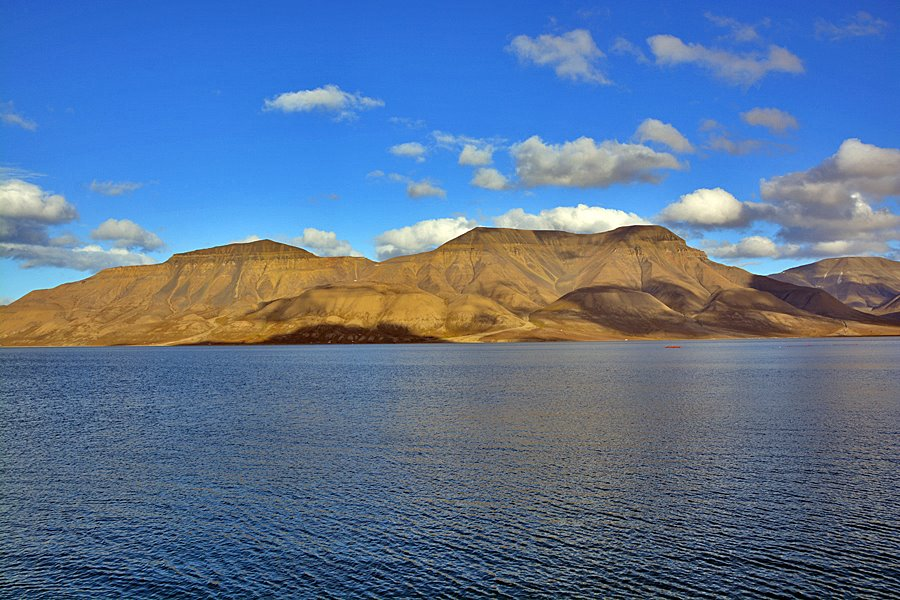
Across Adventfjorden towards Adventtoppen and Hiorthfjellet

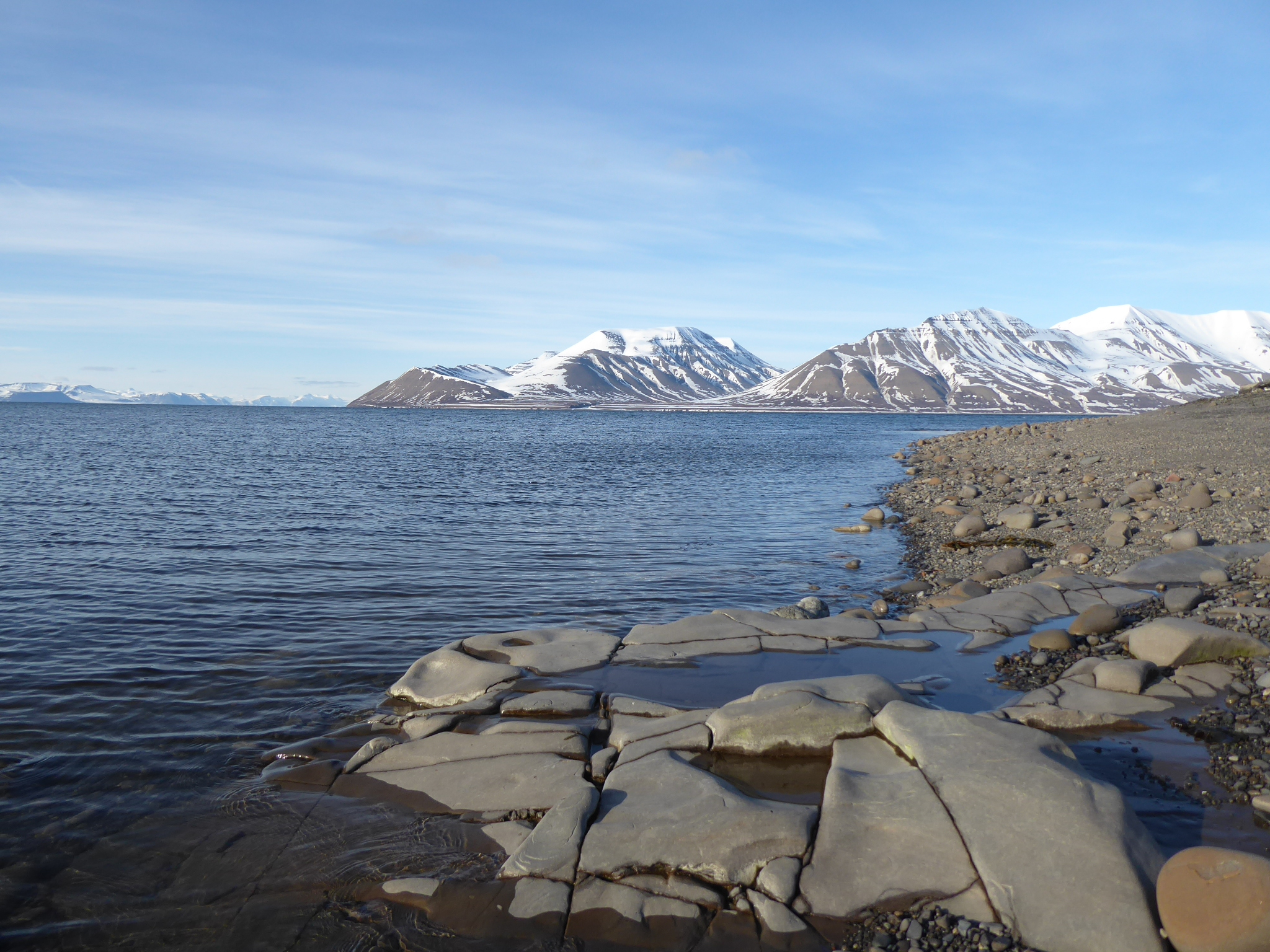
Inlet of Adventfjorden in May 2025
