= Johan Throne Holst =

Norwegian industrialist & politician (1868-1946)

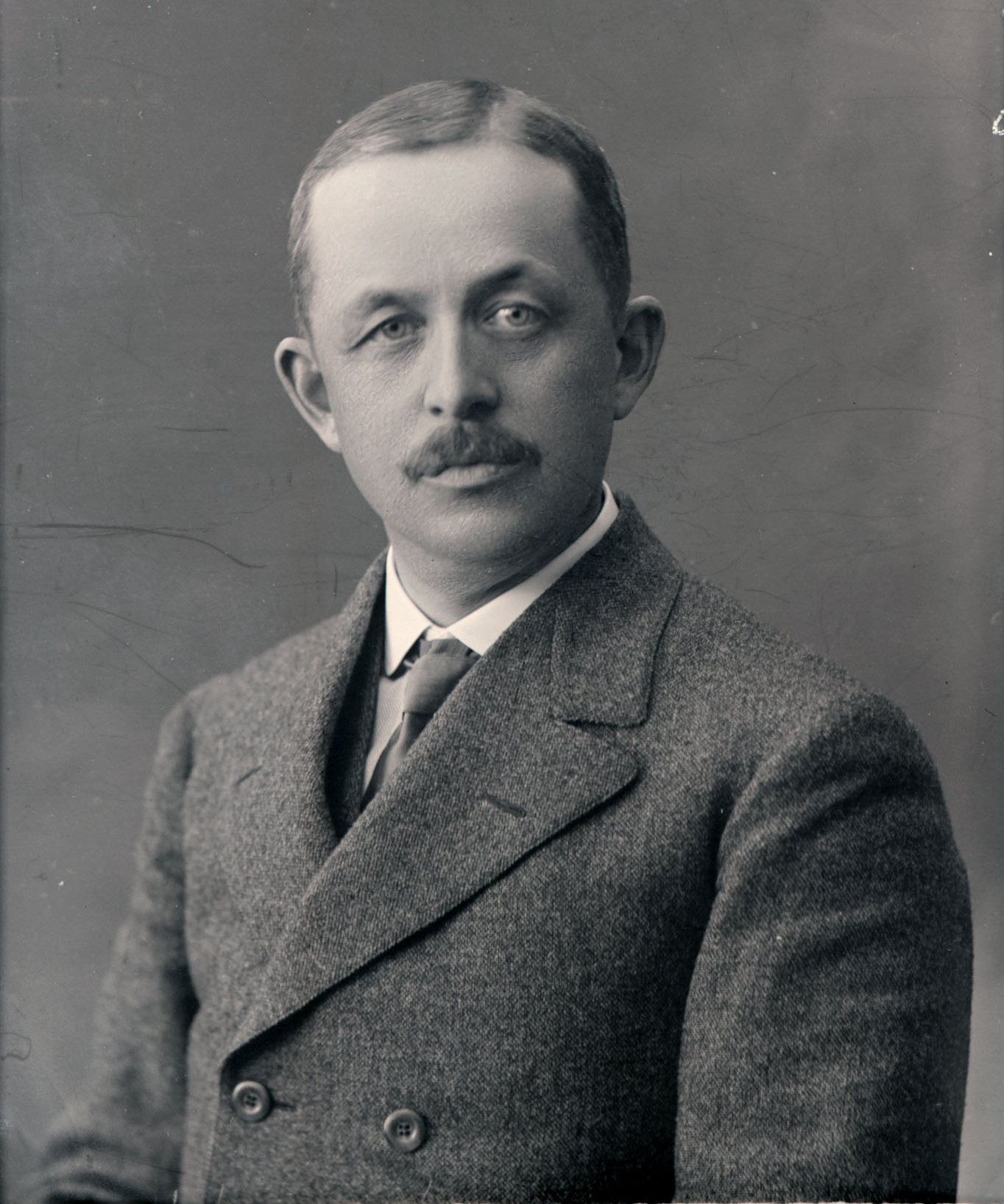

member of the Parliament of Norway
- In office 1910–1912)

Personal details
- Born: 7 February 1868
- Died: 13 February 1946 (aged 78)
- Party: Liberal Left Party
- Occupation: industrialist

Johan Throne Holst (7 February 1868 – 13 February 1946), was a Norwegian industrialist and politician for the Liberal Left Party (Frisinnede Venstre). He was the founder of Marabou and CEO of Freia, now owned and operated by Mondelez International.

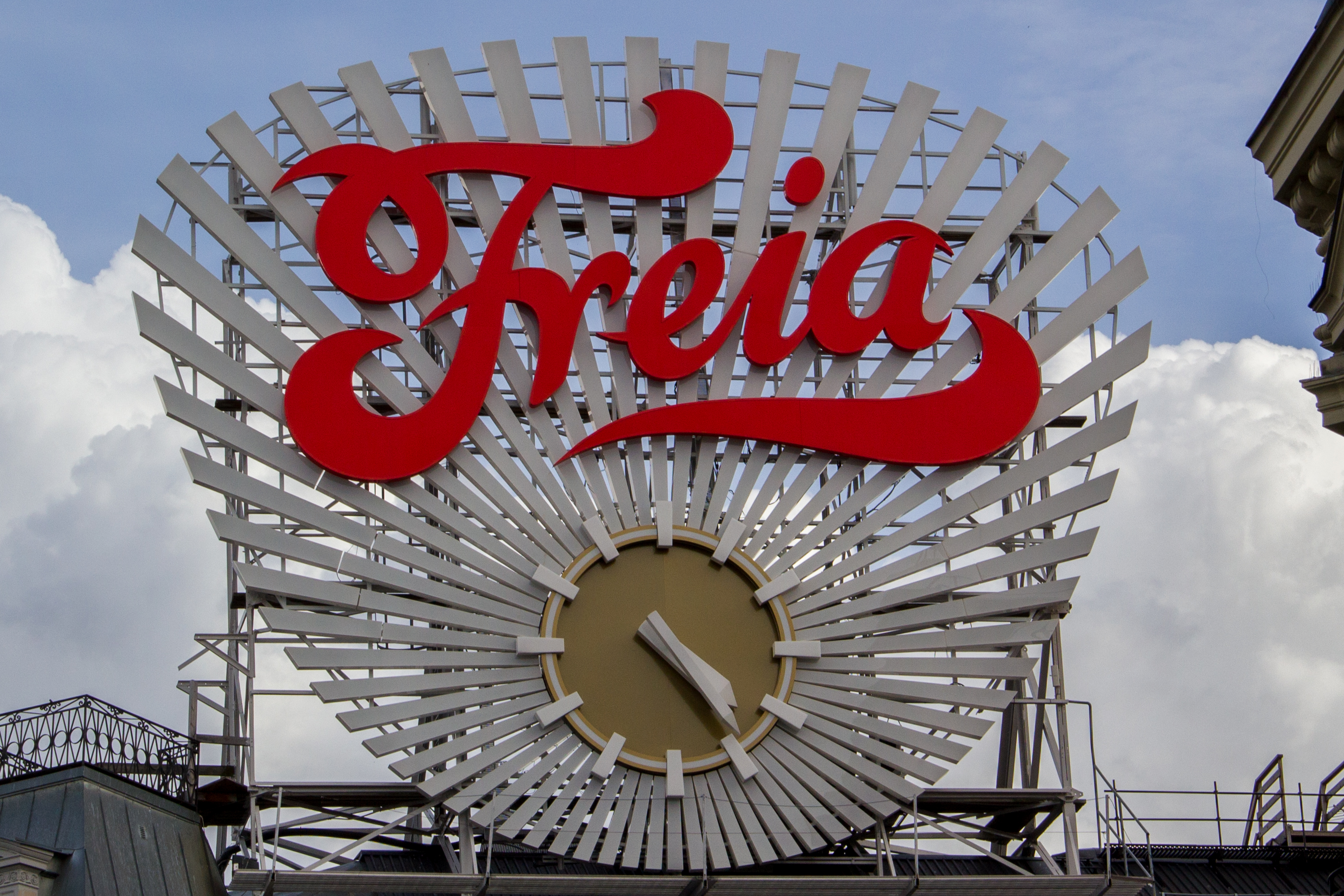
Freia clock at Egertorget square in Oslo

== Biography ==
Throne Holst was born in Trondheim, Norway. He was the son of Johan Martinus Brodtkorb Holst (1829–1913) and Josefa Gørvell (1835–1913).

Throne Holst graduated from Trondheim Cathedral School and attended a trade school in Hamburg (1887–88). He started his business career as a salesman in his father's merchant business in Trondheim. In 1892, Holst bought a recently started chocolate factory in Oslo. Holst built up Freia (Freia Chocolade Fabrik) to be Norway's leading chocolate manufacturer, and a modern workplace, with canteens and its own park for workers, Freiaparken in Oslo. The company was also the first in Norway with its own health care policy, and the first with a 48-hour working week. His son, Harald Throne-Holst was managing director of the Freia chocolate factory from 1948 to 1970 and later CEO.

In 1916, Throne Holst established chocolate production at Sundbyberg, Sweden under the brand name Marabou with his son Henning Throne-Holst (1895–1980) as CEO and director. The brand Marabou was created as the brand name Freia already existed in Sweden. Actual production did not start until 1919 due to shortages in cocoa supply caused by World War I.

He served in the Oslo city council (1904–10) and was elected to the Norwegian Parliament (1909–12) as a representative of the Oslo neighborhood of Hammersborg. In 1923, Throne Holst was appointed chairman of Handelsbanken. Holst distanced himself from Vidkun Quisling by the beginning of the 1930s. In 1941, Holst was in the minority in the Federation of Norwegian Industries who protested against the increased trade that would be introduced during Nazi German occupation.

== Personal life ==
In 1894, he married Hanna Richter Jenssen (1873–1952), daughter of Hans Peter Jenssen (1848–1902) and Signe Klingenberg (1852–1925). They were the parents of business executives Henning Throne-Holst (1895–1980) and Harald Throne-Holst (1905–96).

Johan Throne Holst died during 1946 and was buried at Vår Frelsers gravlund in Oslo. His family retained control over both Marabou and Freia until 1992.

== Selected works ==
- Industri og industrielle problemer : belyst ved erfaringer fra A/S Freia Chocolade Fabrik (Kristiania: Aschehoug. 1914)
- Erindringer og refleksjoner. (Oslo: Gyldendal. 1941)

== Other sources ==
- Rudeng, Erik (1989) Sjokoladekongen : Johan Throne Holst – en biografi (Oslo: Universitetsforlaget( ISBN 82-00-02792-9.
