= Albert Hiorth =

Norwegian engineer

Albert Karl Fredrik Hiorth (17 November 1876 – 12 September 1949) was a Norwegian engineer.

He was born in Kristiania as a son of engineer Fredrik Hiorth. He took his education at Kristiania Technical School and the University of Geneva. He was a member of the Faraday Society. After further studies abroad he settled in Asker.

Hiorth was hired in Kværner in 1899, and became the CEO of Bjølvefossen in 1906. In 1909 he became the CEO of Aurlandsfaldene. A devout Christian and member of the Victoria Institute, he was reputed to look to the Bible for authoritative accounts on present phenomena. He was an active lay preacher, was active in the Palestine Exploration Fund and was especially interested in projects in the British Mandate of Palestine. He became known for a plan to connect the Mediterranean Sea with the Dead Sea by pipeline.
