= Nidar =

Candy subsidiary of the Orkla Group

Nidar AS
- Type: Subsidiary
- Industry: Food manufacturing
- Founded: 1912; 114 years ago
- Headquarters: Trondheim, Norway
- Area served: Norway
- Products: Confectionery
- Number of employees: 600 (2003)
- Parent: Orkla Group
- Website: www.nidar.no

Nidar is a Norwegian producer and distributor of confectionery. Nidar's candy factory is located in Trondheim, Norway. It is part of the Orkla Group.

== Overview ==
The company is a major distributor of sweets in Norway, selling sweets for over NOK 1 billion in 2003, with approx. 600 employees. In January, 2005, the company had a market share of 31.4%.

Nidar produces chocolate, sugar products, confectionery, marzipan and pastilles, in addition to distribution and sales of Wrigley chewing gum and sweets in the Norwegian marketplace. Their brands include: Stratos, Laban, Troika, Crispo, NERO, Smash!, Doc' Halslinser (with or without liquid core), New Energy, Bocca, Bamsemums, Smørbukk, Mokka Trøffel, Mokka Bønner, Nidar Julemarsipan, Extra, Krembanan and Kremtopper.

Nidar was established in 1912 and still based out of Trondheim, Norway. The company went through several acquisitions and mergers in the 1970s, and as such carries on the products and traditions of three other Norwegian candy companies:

- Kiellands Fabrikker A/S, Oslo, est. 1891
- Lorentz Erbe & Søn A/S, Trondheim, est. 1899
- Bergene A/S, Oslo, est. 1906

It owned the Joker Is ice cream brand in the 1980s.

== Gallery ==
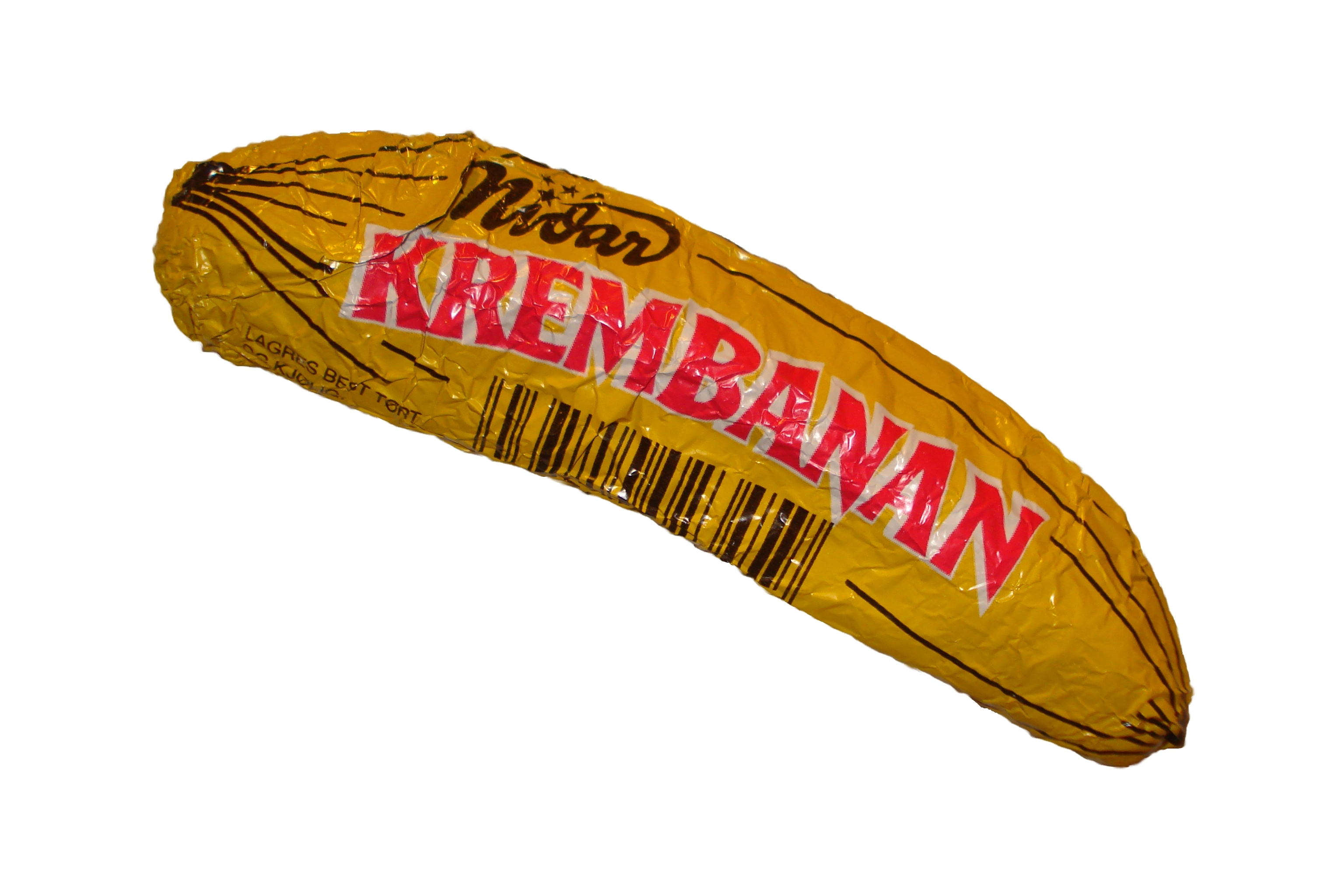
Krembanan bar

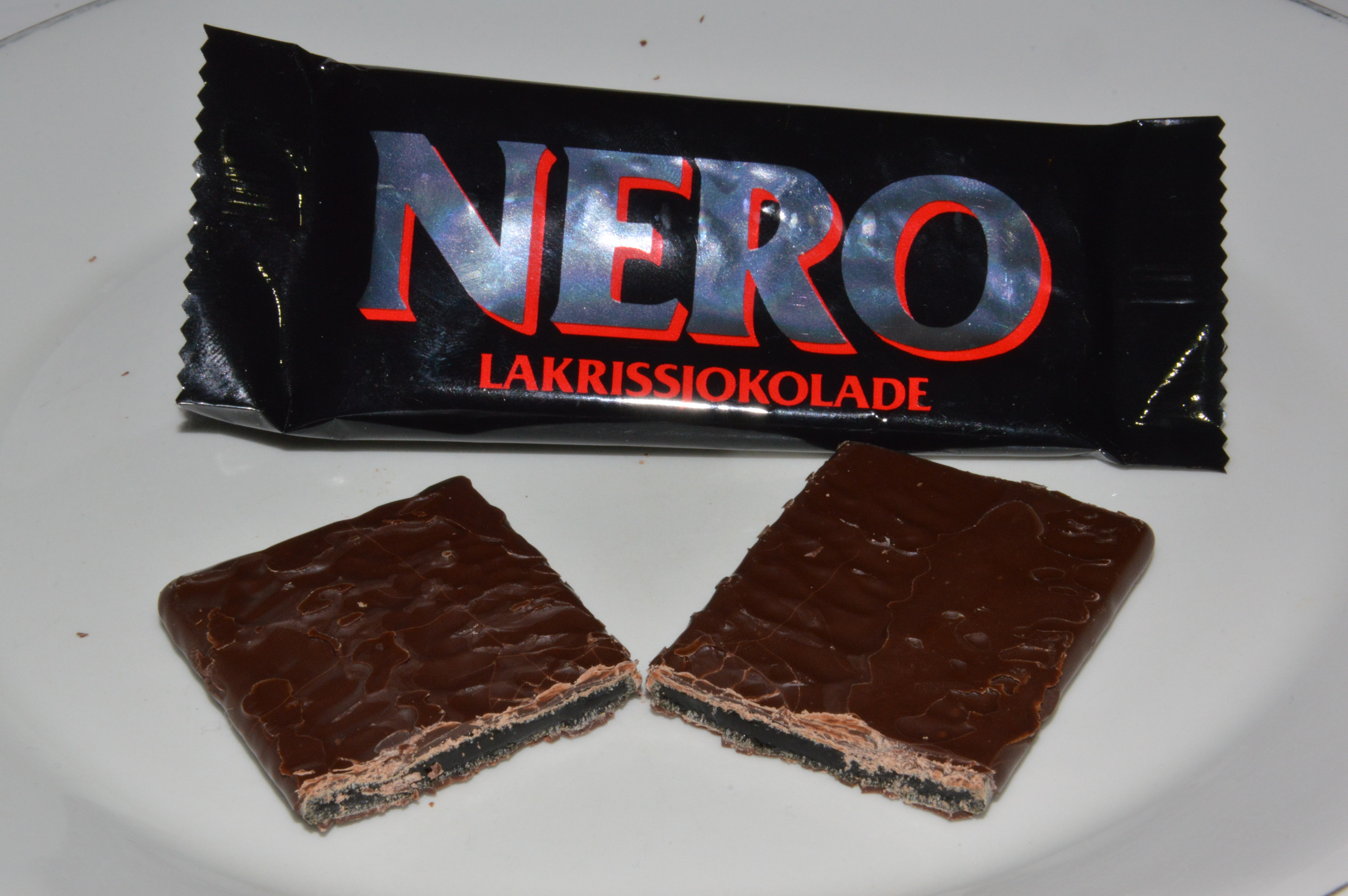
Nero bar

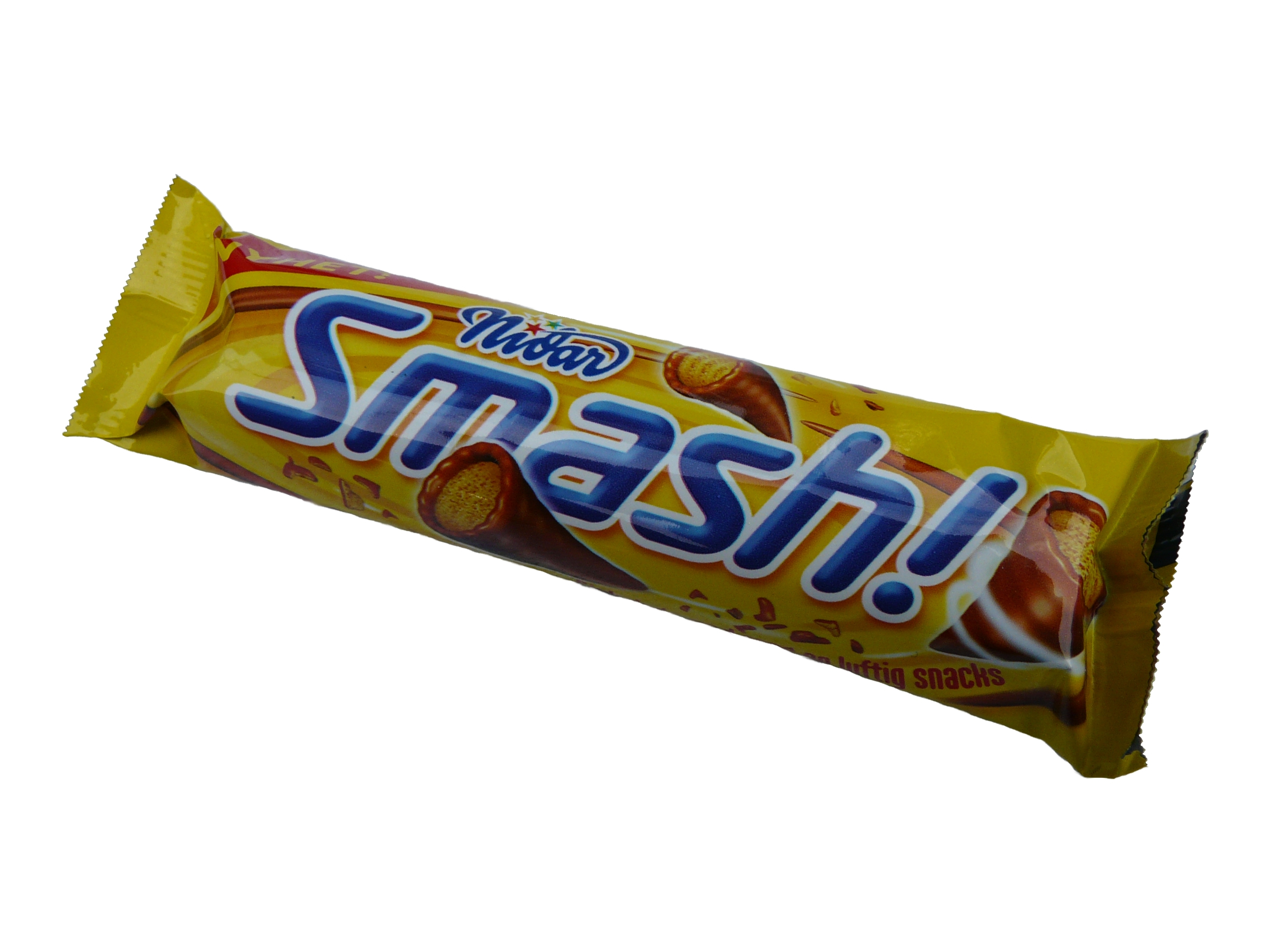
Smash chocolate bar

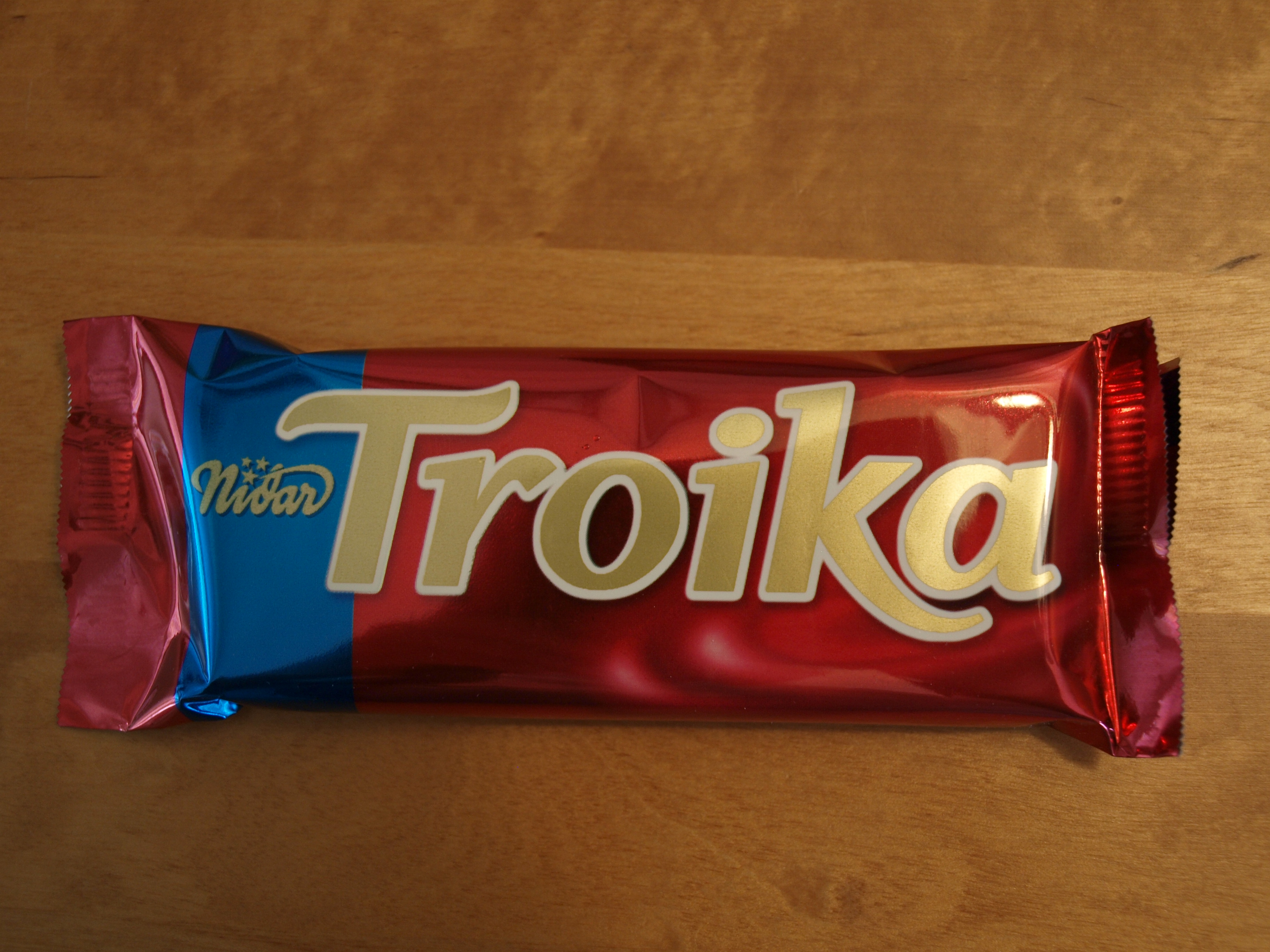
Troika bar

Krembanan is a chocolate-banana candy bar in the shape of a banana. The Krembanan was first made in 1957, and its appearance today has not changed. It is made of one layer of gel and one layer of banana cream covered by chocolate. All Krembanan bars have the same appearance and all weigh 35g. The manufacturer still uses the original machine to pack these "chocolate with a bend" bars; the machine has been in use since 1957 and is the oldest machine in use by Nidar.

Nero is a chocolate- and liquorice-based candy bar. It consists of a liquorice-flavoured jelly with additional aniseed and fennel oil flavourings, covered in a layer of 45%-cacao dark chocolate.

Smash! is a chocolate snack. It consists of salted maize cones covered by milk chocolate, producing a salt and sweet, light and crisp combination. It is primarily sold in Norway under the Nidar brand, and is also available in Sweden, Denmark, and Finland.

Troika is a chocolate-based confection made by Nidar AS of Trondheim, Norway. It consists of three distinct layers, prompting its name, inspired by the Russian word "troika", which means a group of three. The top layer is soft raspberry jelly, the middle layer is truffle, and the bottom one is marzipan. It is also covered with dark chocolate. Troika was launched in 1939 with the name "Geletrøffel".
