= Freia (chocolate) =

Norwegian confectionery company

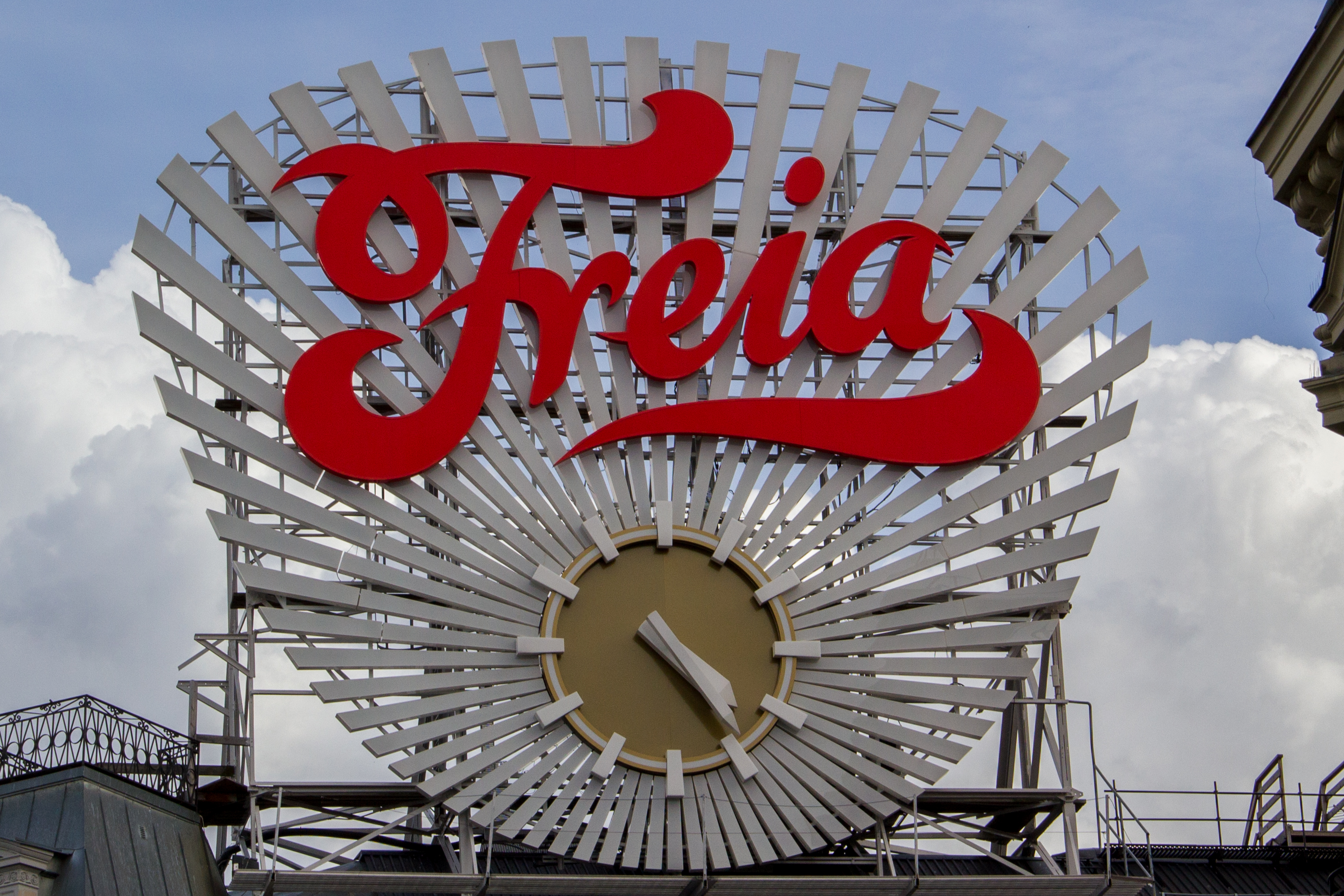
- Type: Subsidiary
- Industry: Food manufacturing
- Founded: 1889
- Founder: Olaf Larsen
- Headquarters: Oslo, Norway
- Area served: Norway
- Products: Confectionery
- Parent: Mondelēz International
- Website: freia.no

Freia is a Norwegian chocolate brand. The brand is known for Freia Melkesjokolade and Kvikk Lunsj, as well as for other candy and dessert products. The company was acquired by Mondelez International in 1993.

== History ==
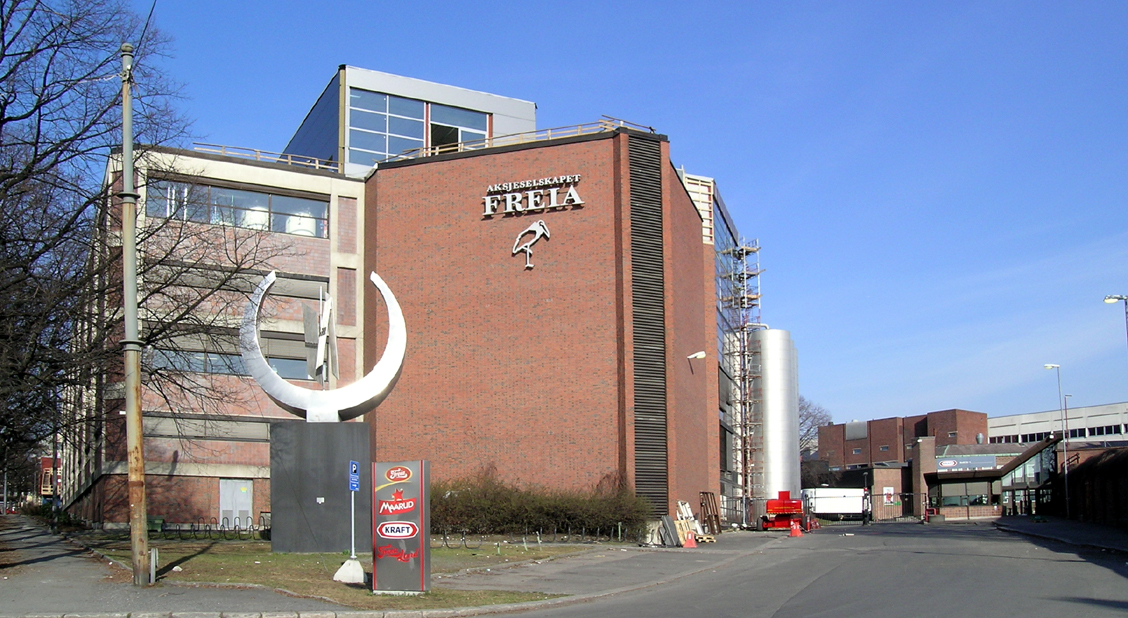
Freia factory at Rodeløkka in Grünerløkka

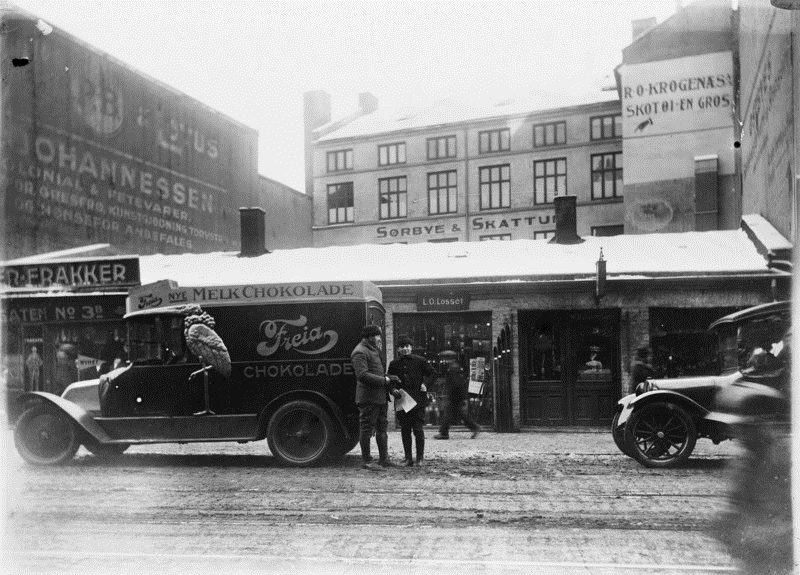
A truck with advertisements by the company Freia in Oslo, Norway, in 1920.

Freia was founded by Olaf Larsen (1867–1920) and Fredrik Wilhelm Hjorth Christensen (1851–) in 1889. Larsen had been experimenting with chocolate for some time and Christensen arranged supplies with cocoa suppliers and paid for machines and the required facilities.

A few years later in 1892, the operation was bought by aspiring entrepreneur and businessman Johan Throne Holst (1868–1946). In his first six years, he grew the enterprise from 7 to 60 employees, and incorporated Freia as a public company in 1898. Holst realized that there was a potential market for edible milk chocolate, in addition to the dark chocolate and other minor products Freia were producing at the time.

In 1916, based on the success in Norway, the Throne-Holst family founded the chocolate factory Marabou in Sundbyberg outside of Stockholm in Sweden and in 1943, moved to the present location in Upplands Väsby. The name Freia (or Freja) could not be used due to a conflicting trademark in Sweden. The name Marabou was chosen instead and is based on the marabou stork which was part of Freia's logo at the time. Production started in 1919, due to shortages in cocoa supply caused by World War I.

In 1990, Freia bought all the shares in Marabou. On 12 October 1992, Norsk Hydro, Procordia and Finnish Paulig sold their shares in Freia Marabou to the Philip Morris company Kraft General Foods, a total of 55% of the shares. A few weeks later, Hershey Foods sold its shares (18.6%), giving Philip Morris full control of Freia. On 22 April 1993, the Ministry of Trade and Industry granted Kraft General Foods Holding Norway Inc a license to take over all the shares in Freia Marabou AS. Freia was purchased by Kraft Foods Nordic for NOK 3 billion.

After Kraft's acquisition, most of the operation remains at Freia's factory in Oslo. Parts of production have been outsourced to Lithuania, Estonia and Sweden, following restructuring from the parent company in the mid-2000s. Since 2012, the owner has been Mondelēz International.

== Products ==
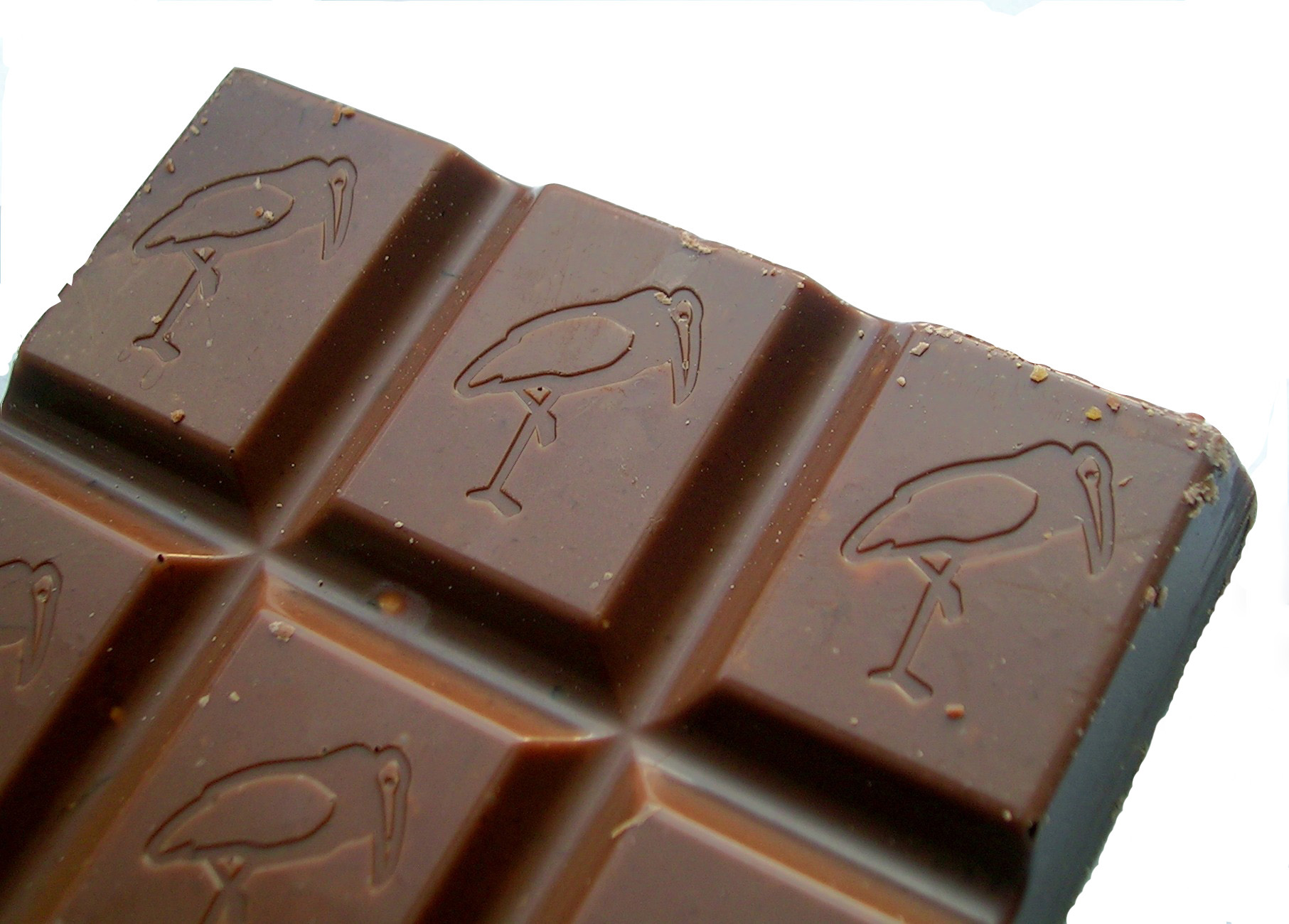
Chocolate with the marabou stork logo

The company's flagship product has since then been the milk chocolate candy bar, Freia Melkesjokolade. On the basis of this product, Freia produces several other candy bars, with added nuts, raisins, cookies and Daim pieces. The brand has constantly been marketed in a national romantic spirit – as the essence of everything that is Norwegian. Their slogan is Et lite stykke Norge (A little piece of Norway).

== See also ==
- List of bean-to-bar chocolate manufacturers

== Additional sources ==
- Ibsen, Hilde (1998) Et lite stykke Norge : Freia 100 år (Tano Aschehoug) ISBN 82-518-3683-2,
