= History of Scandinavian Airlines System (1933–1952) =

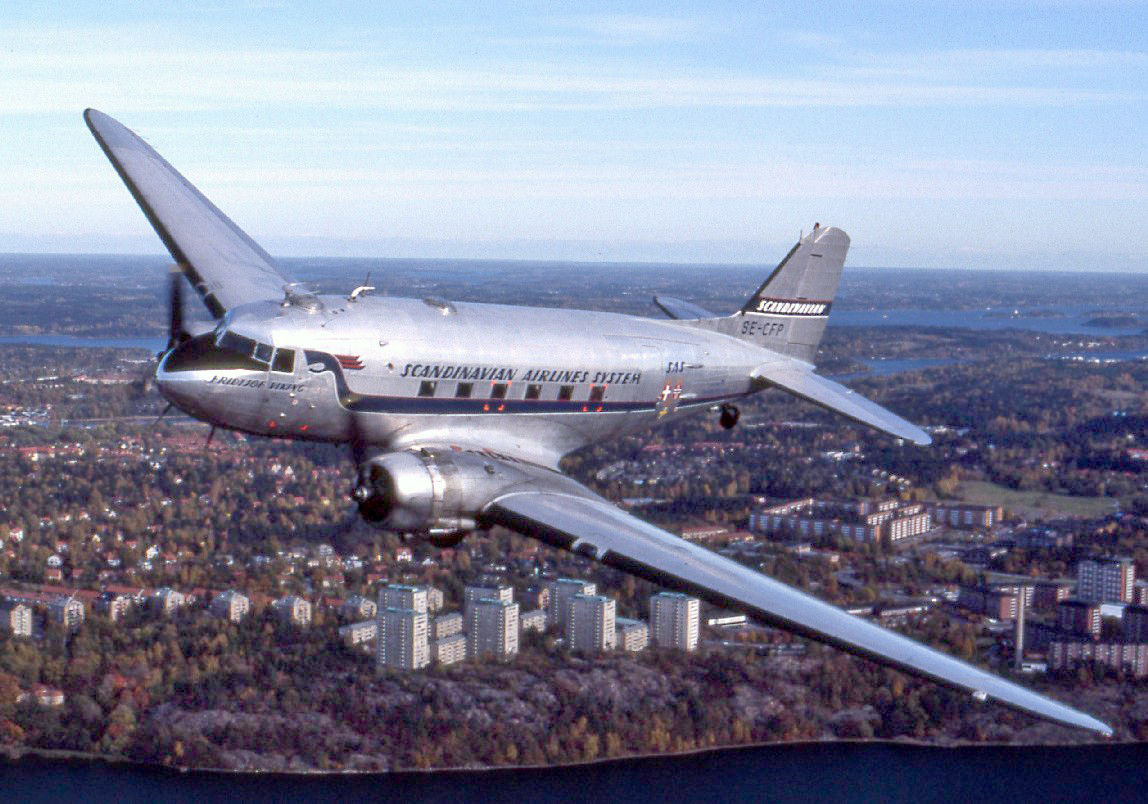
Heritage Douglas DC-3 operating in SAS livery

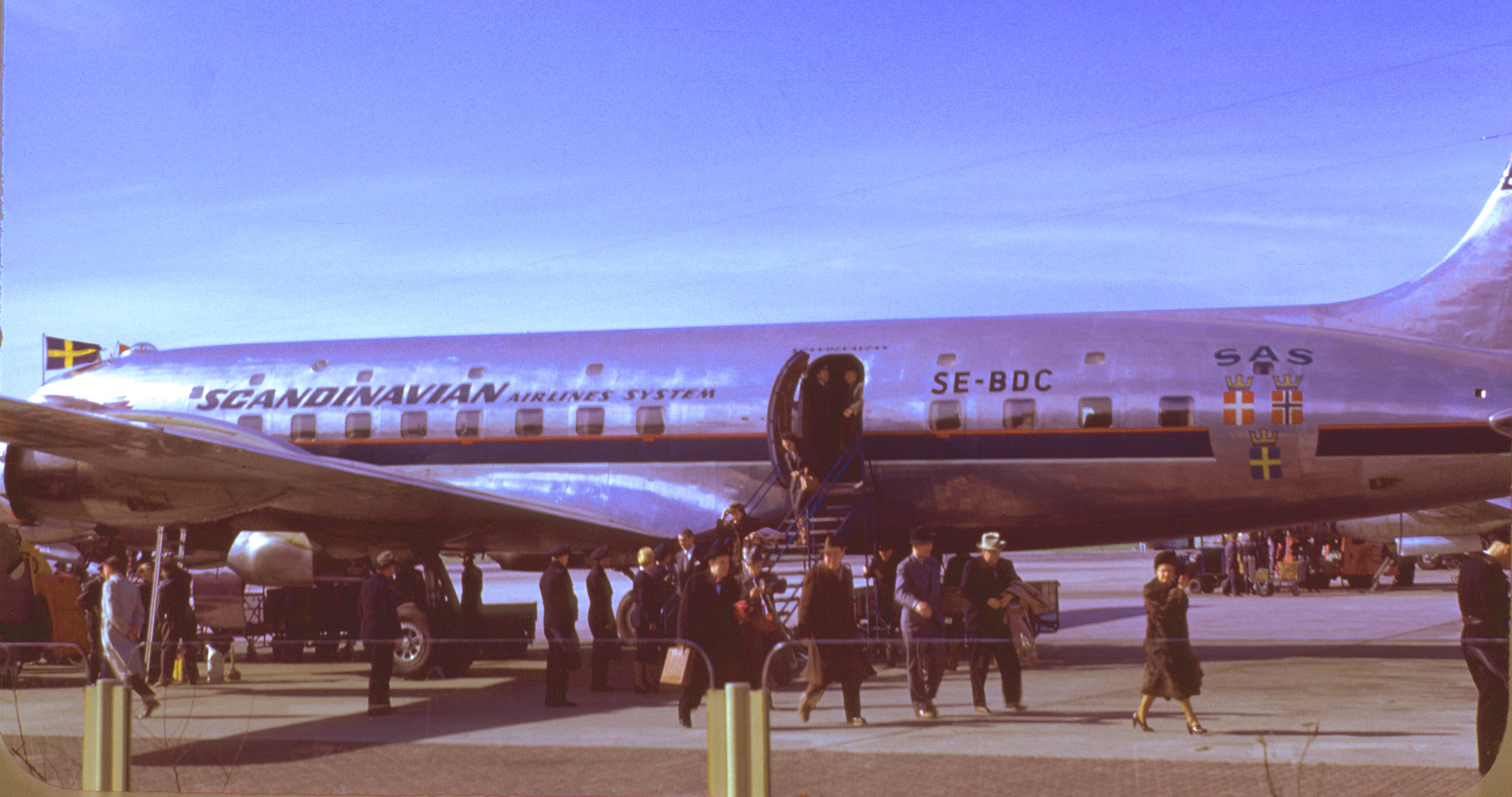
SAS Douglas DC-6

The history of Scandinavian Airlines System (SAS) from 1933 to 1951 covers the first attempts at transatlantic travel, the establishment of a consortium and finally the establishment of the consolidated SAS. Aerotransport, the national airline of Sweden, and Det Norske Luftfartselskap (DNL), the national airline of Norway, both started planning transatlantic routes in the mid-1930s. By 1939, negotiations were started with Det Danske Luftfartselskab (DDL) of Denmark, and by 1940 services were to begin. Because of the German occupation of Denmark and Norway, the plans collapsed. In Sweden, Svensk Interkontinental Lufttrafik (SILA) was founded to start private transatlantic flights, which commenced in 1945. Negotiations were started again, and in 1946 the consortium Overseas Scandinavian Airlines System (OSAS) was established to start routes to New York and South America.

From 1948, the airlines pooled all their aircraft into European Scandinavian Airlines System (ESAS), which used the SAS brand for all domestic and European services. However, ESAS was only a business agreement, and when DNL threatened to leave to cooperation in 1950, it was agreed to merge the operations of the three airlines into a consolidated consortium. With the merger, the national governments secured a 50% ownership of their respective holding companies. In the 1940s, SAS operated a fleet of Douglas DC-3, DC-4 and DC-6, Vickers VC.1 Viking, Saab Scandia land planes, and Short Sandringham and Junkers Ju 52 seaplanes.

== Pre-war attempts ==
The first discussion of a Scandinavian transatlantic route was in 1933, when DDL and Aerotransport conducted discussions with Charles Lindbergh. However, no specific plans were made. For Denmark, part of the interest was spurred with the possibility of reaching Greenland. DDL started a partnership with British interests, creating European & American Airways, which was planned to operate transatlantic flights from Denmark via United Kingdom. The company was inaugurated on 21 October 1935 in London, with GBP 5,000 in share capital. While the company remained in existence until the late 1940s, it never operated any aircraft.

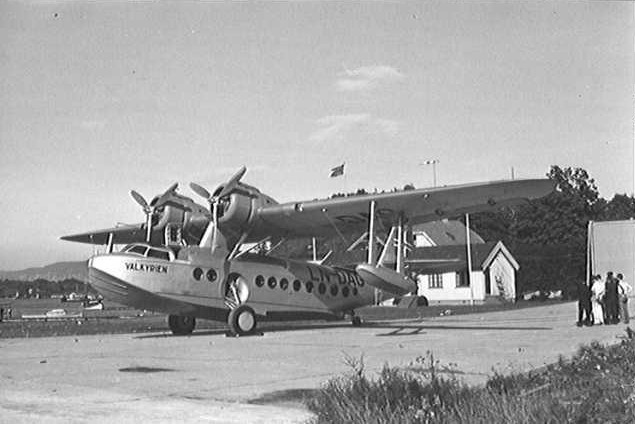
The Sikorsky S-43 Valkyrien at Oslo Airport, Gressholmen in 1936, bought by DNL to operate in pool with Pan Am on the transatlantic route

In 1936, DNL started negotiations with Pan American Airways (Pan Am) about cooperation on the transatlantic route between Norway and the United States. DNL argued that Norway's location made it an ideal base for the European flights to North America. Pan Am would operate from New York to Reykjavík, while DNL would operate the service from Reykjavík to Bergen and onwards to various destinations in Europe. The contract was signed in March and DNL bought a Sikorsky S-43 flying boat, registered as LN-DAG and christened Valkyrien. However, after the aircraft was delivered and three weeks before the route was to be inaugurated, Pan Am changed their mind, canceled the agreement and decided that the transatlantic route should instead operate via Newfoundland to Foynes, Ireland, and via the Azores in the winter.

Rudolf Olsen, a major owner of DNL, stated afterwards that DNL was too small in comparison to Pan Am to make a stable alliance. Instead, Olsen wanted the four Nordic flag carriers to cooperate on transcontinental operations. Representatives from DNL, DDL, Aerotransport and the Finnish Aero met in Geilo, Norway, on 18 April 1937 to discuss possible strategies. The initial discussions regarded a closer cooperation between the four companies in Nordic and European routes, as well as agreement to try to coordinate legislation, fleets and contracts.

In 1936, Aerotransport and Aeroflot had started a cooperation on a route between Stockholm and Moscow, with connections from Stockholm to Siberia and Irkutsk and Vladivostok. Aerotransport wanted to connect westwards via DNL's network to Foynes, with connection to Pan Am's flights. However, the proposal was rejected by Aeroflot. The other problem was that Imperial Airways wanted to prioritize British, rather than Scandinavian, mail on west-bound flights, causing DNL to cancel their plans to connect to Ireland. In a meeting in Berlin on 10 January 1939, the four Nordic airlines agreed to let DNL continue to negotiate with Pan Am about pooling transatlantic flights, with DNL representing all four companies. Support was gained from the Nordic post companies, who would guarantee for the use of the route. DNL's Bernt Balchen went to the United States to negotiate with American authorities and suppliers to start a route.

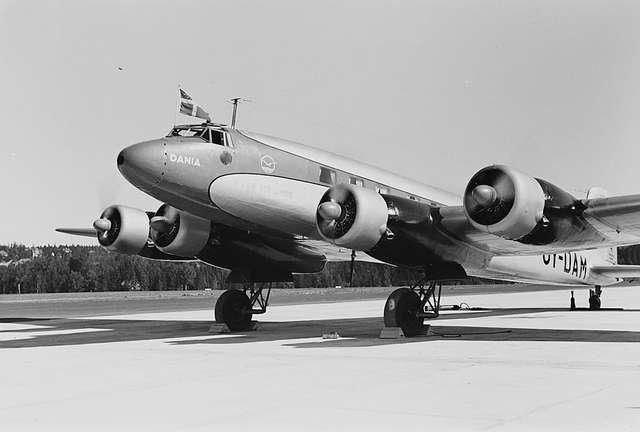
The DDL Focke-Wulf Fw 200 Dania

In mid-1939, Aerotransport, DNL and DDL met in Oslo to negotiate possible transatlantic routes. By then, Shannon Airport in Ireland was under construction, and both Imperial Airways, Deutsche Lufthansa and KLM were planning to start transatlantic services. There was agreement that a route to Foynes should be established, and at the same time planning of a Scandinavian transatlantic route. A committee was established with representation from all four Nordic airlines. With the break-out of World War II, Pan Am terminated its Foynes route, instead moving it to the Azores to avoid the war zone. DNL started negotiations with Pan Am again, and proposed a pooling, where DNL chartered Pan Am aircraft and crew for the west-bound flights, while Pan Am flew the east-bound flights. With the Soviet invasion of Finland on 30 November 1939, Aero's interest in the cooperation was reduced, as the Finnish authorities concentrated on their war effort. On 2 January 1940, the committee presented a calculation for the post offices, whereby 700 kilograms (1,500 lb) post per flight would cost SEK 1.3 million per year. This was agreed to, and nine days later a delegation was sent to the US to negotiate.

The basis was that Stavanger Airport, Sola on the Norwegian West Coast was to be the hub. The delegation hoped to procure a Boeing 314, giving a capacity for 20 passengers and 2 tonnes (2.0 long tons; 2.2 short tons) of freight. One intermediate landing, planned at Botwood in Newfoundland, was needed before reaching New York. The trip was planned to take 26 and a half hours, comparing to the 13 days it took the delegation to reach Washington, D.C. Preparatory meetings with the Scandinavian ambassadors started on 26 January, followed by two months of negotiations with American authorities, manufacturers, airlines and airports, to insure rights to all aspects of the operations, including training of crew, insurance, agreements with the United States Postal Service, choice of route, weather services and schedules. The neutral American authorities were interested in establishing a route to the then-neutral Scandinavian countries, and the negotiations went well, with all necessary permissions and contracts gained. Pan Am and Juan Trippe set as a condition that the four countries establish a single consortium to function as Pan Am's counter-party. It was decided that Aerotransport initially would function as the counter-party.

The only lack of permission was from the Scandinavian authorities, from which the delegation had not had time to receive permission before it left. However, on 5 March, Aerotransport, DDL and DNL made an agreement with Pan Am to operate a route using a Boeing 314 Clipper flying boat from New York via Botwood and Reykjavík to Bergen. It was the American authorities who wanted a landing in Iceland, and Bergen was chosen instead of Stavanger because the latter lay within the area defined by American authorities as part of the war zone. The route would commence during the summer and operate eight times, with twelve services the following year. The aircraft was chartered from Pan Am for US$15,000 per trip. All formalities with external parties were completed on 12 March, and the operations approved by the board of the three Scandinavian airlines on 6 April. Representatives from the Scandinavian delegation visited Douglas, Lockheed and Pratt & Whitney, and planned to use Douglas DC-4 land planes from 1942, with up to two weekly round trips.

== World War II ==
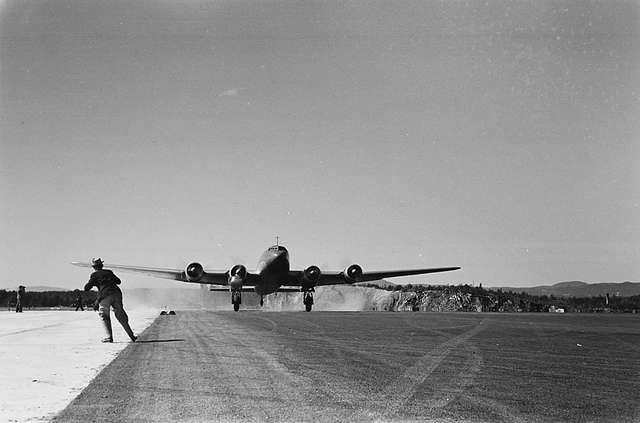
A DDL Focke-Wulf Fw 200 taking off at Oslo Airport, Fornebu in 1939

On 9 April 1940, Germany invaded Norway and Denmark, canceling the immediate plans for a transatlantic route. In Denmark, DDL received continued permission to operate domestic services from June, and to Berlin from 24 June. It was later extended to Munich, Vienna and Malmö, Sweden, and along with the main Copenhagen–Århus route continued throughout the war. In June 1943, DDL increased its share capital from DKK 3 to 15 million.

In Norway, DNL was permitted to operate a limited route in Northern Norway, until the pilots fled to Britain in 1941 to join the resistance. The airline suffered from a general mistrust both from the German and Allied authorities. The Germans regarded Norwegian shipowners as highly suspicious people, since these had their fleet organized in Nortraship and used in Allied convoys. The Norwegian authorities in exile were also distrustful of DNL, because the airline had taken initiative to operate a route, essentially helping the German forces. There was also an uncertainty as to whether the national airline of Norway should continue to be private, or if a state-owned airline should be established. To look at the issue, the Norwegian government-in-exile established the Norwegian Civil Aviation Board to look at all matters regarding civil aviation. It was this board which was permitted to negotiate traffic rights with other countries, make purchase rights of aircraft and participated in the foundation of the International Air Transport Association and the International Civil Aviation Organization. Throughout the war, the board took no steps to procure civilian aircraft for after the war.

Sweden, although neutral, became isolated in relation to North America, as all mail had to be sent eastward via the Soviet Union, or westwards via Portugal. The first became impossible after the Soviet Union and Germany went to war on 22 June 1941, and the latter from 7 December when the United States entered the war. The British Royal Air Force started a route from Leuchars, Scotland, to Stockholm, but this was limited to transport of mail and passengers used for the Allied forces. From 1942, Aerotransport introduced mail flights from Stockholm to Scotland, which were relayed onwards to North America. On 10 September 1942, the board of Aerotransport recommended that Sweden start its own intercontinental services. SEK 6 million was needed to purchase two four-engine planes; the plans called for the other Nordic flag carriers to join after the end of the war. The government did not want to threaten the Swedish neutrality, and therefore instructed the state-owned company not to negotiate with an Allied power. Instead, they wanted a private company to make the arrangements, and the privilege was granted to the Wallenberg family.

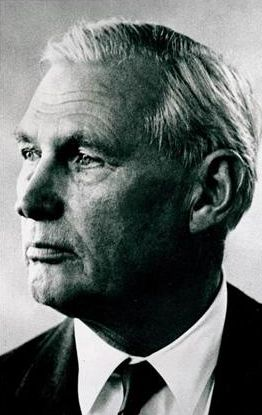
Marcus Wallenberg Jr. was instrumental in establishing Svensk Interkontinental Lufttrafik in 1943

Marcus Wallenberg Jr. contacted several of the shipping companies in Gothenburg to join the venture, but these were skeptical. They required that the head office and hub be located there, and Aerotransport was excluded from participating. This was not acceptable for Wallenberg, and instead the capital was raised from Stockholm-companies; the largest owner became the Wallenberg-controlled, Gothenburg-based Svenska Amerika Linien. Svensk Interkontinental Lufttrafik (SILA) was founded on 22 February 1943 with SEK 12 million in share capital. The work of maintenance of the aircraft was subcontracted to Aerotransport.

Five days later, a delegation from SILA was sent to the UK and US to purchase aircraft and receive traffic rights. The negotiations in the US were led by Per A. Norlin, who attempted to procure Douglas DC-4 aircraft. Because of Aerotransport's route to Moscow, the connection would allow a service between the allied US and Soviet Union, via a neutral country. However, the US was not willing to sell any aircraft until after the war, so Norlin agreed to purchase ten converted Douglas C-54 (DC-4) for delivery after the war for SEK 20 million. This was the first contract for delivery of civilian planes for after the war made by Douglas. Loans were secured from the First National City Bank of New York and Stockholms Enskilda Bank.

The procurement of ten aircraft was more than initially needed by SILA, so negotiations were held with DDL and DNL about selling some of the aircraft to them. Because the owners of DNL were not able to hold meetings and the airline inactive, and in part because of the transfer of Norwegian negotiation power to the Norwegian Civil Aviation Board, DNL did not attempt to procure any aircraft. Still, negotiations continued between the flag carriers, and DNL stated in 1944 that they were interested in procuring some aircraft. US authorities urged the Scandinavian airlines to make a common bid for the traffic rights, and the flag carriers started discussing creating a consortium. Among the issues was the distribution of ownership: DDL suggested a 40% stake for SILA and 30% for DDL and DNL, with the latter two granting Aero 10% if they should join; DNL proposed an equal ownership between the three.

In 1943, a fleet of seven American B-17 Flying Fortress had made an emergency landing in Sweden, and the pilots and planes were being held by Sweden. Norlin started to negotiate with the US Air Force for a trade; the US was in more of a need of pilots than aircraft, and agreed to sell the aircraft for US$1 each to SILA in exchange for the release of the pilots. In June 1944, the aircraft were transferred to Saab for conversion to passenger aircraft. However, permission to operate routes from Sweden to the United States was never agreed upon during the war.

== Establishment ==
After the end of the war, DNL had no assets or personnel, while DDL had a single airworthy aircraft. SILA, on the other hand, had a fleet of intercontinental B-17 aircraft and started flights to New York on 27 June. By 1946, the DC-4 were gradually delivered, with three sold to Aerotransport, two to DDL and two to DNL. In Norway, the Norwegian Civil Aviation Board and the Royal Norwegian Air Force conducted all flights in 1945. Capital was raised during the year, including a 20% stake by the government, and a 20-year concession was granted in February 1946.

Negotiations between the three flag carriers started in Copenhagen on 2 February 1946. For Sweden, Aerotransport and SILA had partially opposing opinions about a Scandinavian cooperation. In the government and the state-owned Aerotransport, it was considered desirable that Sweden operate the route on its own, because of the country's size and its established airline. There was also a conflict, where forces were wanting to merge Aerotransport and SILA, in part to nationalize the intercontinental airline, in part to achieve economy of scale.

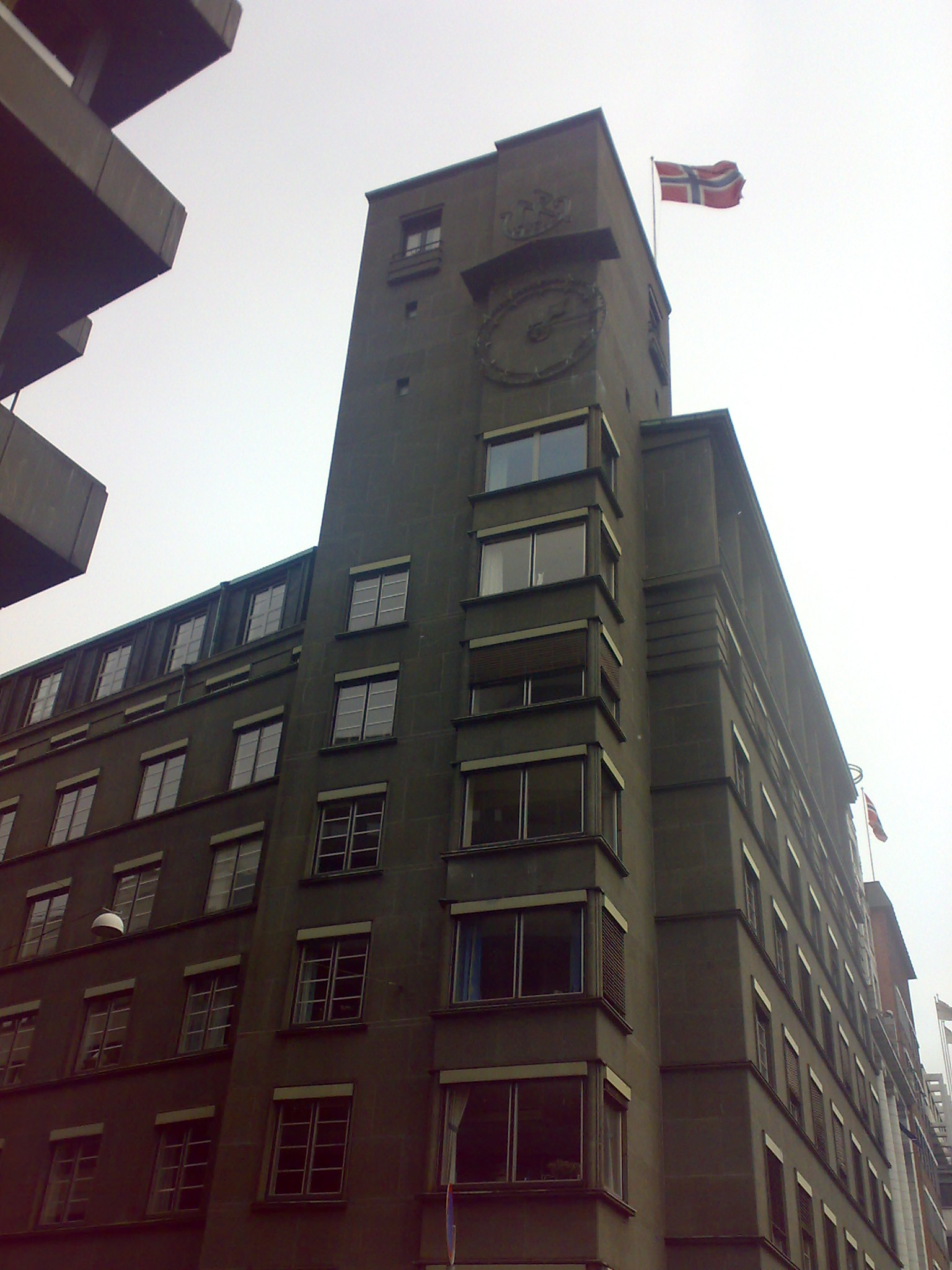
The agreement to create SAS was signed at 03:00 on 1 August 1946 in the Norwegian Shipowners' Association's head office in Oslo. This was also the location for the 1951 agreement that created the consolidated SAS.

Among the issues of the negotiations, was the need for a workshop that met American standards. At the time, only Aerotransport had such facilities, although DDL planned to establish one at Copenhagen Airport. Initially the US had also required a single counter-party, in a consortium, but this was later withdrawn, so the airlines were free to instead establish a pool. However, the advantages of the consortium were preferred by the negotiators, because it would remove the nationality from the employees and operations. A holistic proposal was launched on 7 June, where DDL and DNL would receive two parts ownership, and SILA three parts; each partner would receive two board members. All employees would work for the consortium, while the aircraft were to be leased from the partners. The head office was to be located in Stockholm.

Disagreement existed over which airport should be used as a hub. To have a nationally neutral CEO, Canadian American Peter Redpaths was selected. There was also agreement that the airline should have a single brand name, and both "Scandinavian Airlines System" and "Scandinavian United Airlines" was suggested. It was also agreed that the consortium should take over SILA's operations to South America and to Ethiopia (although SILA lost the traffic rights there the same year).

When the Swedish delegation returned to Stockholm, they were instructed by the government and Aerotransport to set higher demands. The Swedish government did not want to participate with less than a 50% share, and preferably as a majority owner. It was stated that this was because they had half the population and the only organization capable of operating intercontinental routes. They also required a pool solution with employees in the national companies. When the parties met in Copenhagen on 25 June, the Swedish demands were rejected and the meeting quickly dissolved, with DDL and DNL stating that they would establish their own consortium. SILA was willing to accept the Danish–Norwegian terms, and even threatened to liquidate themselves – and thereby eliminate all private capital from the Swedish airlines – if Aerotransport did not compromise. Another meeting was held on 18 July, without any progress.

Route map of OSAS after the establishment

On 31 July, a delegation from the companies met in Oslo. The governments of Denmark and Norway had both stated that unless Sweden accepted a minority stake, there would be no deal. The Swedish Minister for Communications, Torsten Nilsson (Social Democrat) had instructed SILA and Aerotransport to find a Scandinavian solution, even with a Swedish minority stake. After eight hours negotiation in Oslo, the three delegation leaders, Marcus Wallenberg (SILA), Thomas Falck (DNL) and Per Kampmann (DDL) went to a separate room to solve the last issues. These were related to whether operations should be done by a consortium; the distribution of ownership; the personnel responsibility; the composition of the board; the right to leave the cooperation; and the responsibility to cover the costs of maintenance. After three hours, the three men had reached an agreement: a five-year agreement was made, and Aerotransport would temporarily supply all maintenance; employees would be employed by the national airlines, but paid by and work for the consortium; a 3–2–2 ownership split would be established, but with equal board representation; and the head office would be located in Stockholm. The contract was signed at 03:00 on 1 August 1946.

== Overseas Scandinavian Airlines System ==
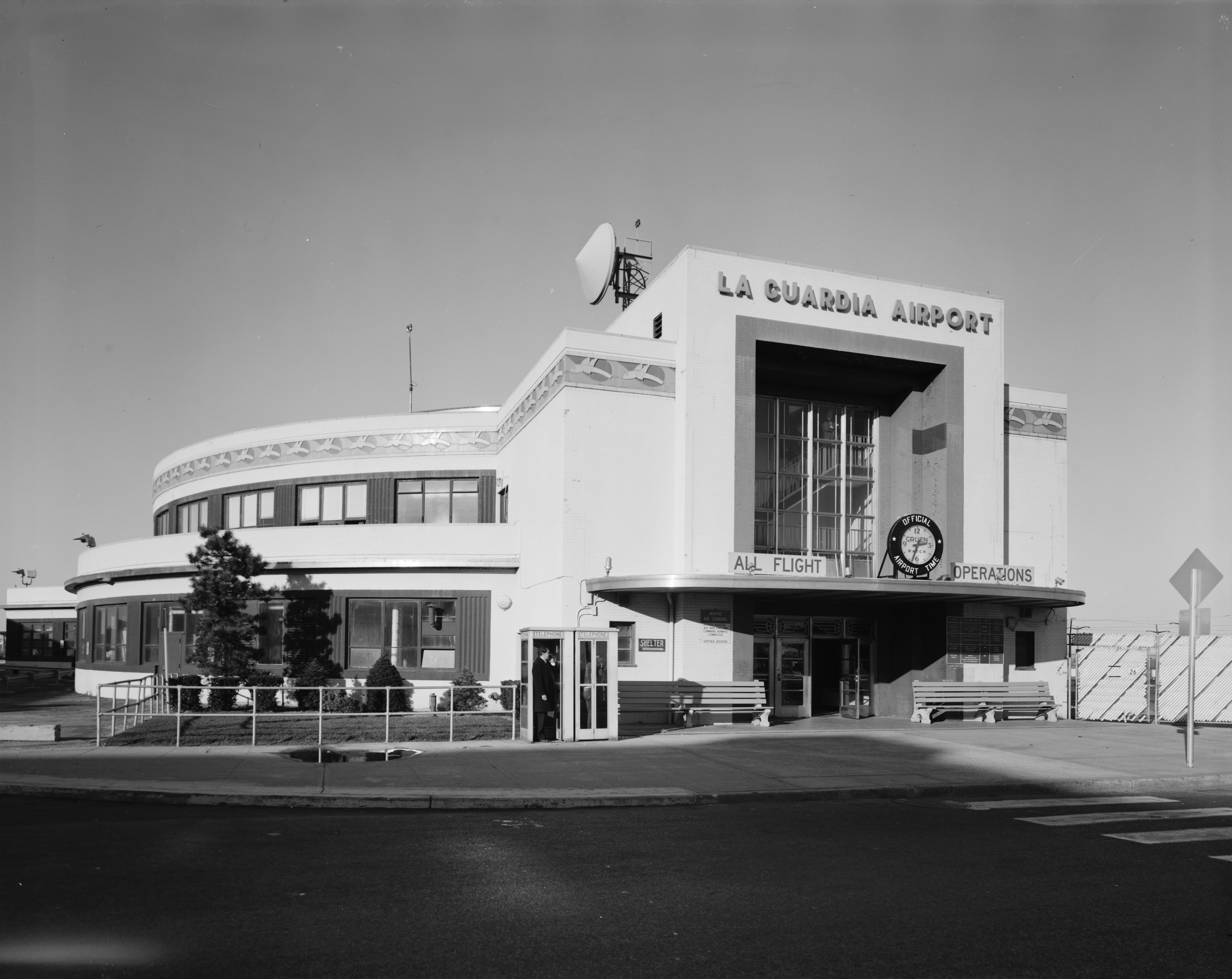
LaGuardia Airport in New York City became SAS' first destination

Each of the national airlines had to select employees to be based in Stockholm. While DNL and SILA had ample crew to choose between, DDL chose to hire American and British airmen. The allocation of crew and aircraft were to follow the 3–2–2 distribution. The thirty-first and last transatlantic round trip flight by SILA was completed on 30 July. The new SAS service would provide two round services per week, both originating at Bromma, where Aerotransport had its technical base. One weekly service would operate via Oslo Airport, Fornebu, another via Copenhagen. Refuelling stops would have to be made at Glasgow Prestwick Airport and Gander International Airport, Newfoundland, before landing at LaGuardia Airport in New York. Travel time was 24 hours.

The first SAS aircraft to operate was a DC-4 belonging to DNL, which landed at Bromma on 5 August. The DC-4s had a theoretic capacity of 44, but SAS chose to install 28 seats to increase comfort. The first flight with the SAS livery was flown on 17 September, and included a large delegation from SAS's management. Prior to this, SAS had established an American subsidiary, SAS Inc, which was able to sell as many tickets as those sold in Scandinavia. A large group of west-bound travelers were Eastern European emigrants, who had their fares paid by American relatives. The cabin load was good, and the frequency increased until daily services were introduced from 16 June 1947.

Operations to South America operated from Stockholm via Copenhagen onwards to Lyon, Lisbon, Dakar, Natal, Rio de Janeiro, Montevideo and Buenos Aires. The first flight departed on 30 September, and for the first few months the service terminated in Montevideo. The route had a low cabin load, was constantly delayed because of the six intermediate stops, and failed to gain patronage owing to its flying only two round services each month.

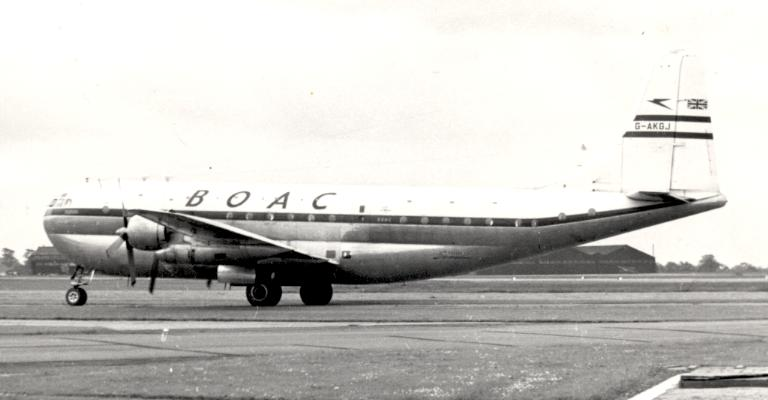
SAS never took delivery of their Boeing 377 Stratocruiser, which were instead delivered to British Overseas Airways Corporation

Per A. Norlin became SAS's first CEO. In the first 17 months until the end of 1947, SAS carried 10,000 passengers and achieved revenue of SEK 37 million. In mid 1946, SAS placed an order for four Stratocruisers from Boeing. In late 1946, Douglas launched the DC-6; reports from the Boeing plant showed delays and concerns that the aircraft would not meet expectations. On 15 November, the SAS board decided to order seven DC-6, to supplement the Stratocruisers. The Stratocruisers ordered from Boeing were not delivered until 1949, two years after order and very delayed.

SAS planned to use Stavanger Airport, Sola as its hub, providing feeder traffic to the capital cities. Stavanger was in part chosen because it had the only suitable runway. Reports from Boeing showed that the maintenance costs would be very high for the aircraft, and SAS decided that it would be cheaper to contract with British Overseas Airways Corporation (BOAC), which had also ordered the Stratocruiser, to perform maintenance. When it became clear that the aircraft would not be delivered until 1950, SAS started negotiations to sell them, and reached an agreement with BOAC to purchase the aircraft for the same cost as SAS had paid.

In 1946, Norwegian ship-owner Ludvig G. Braathen had establish Braathens SAFE, and started charter traffic, mainly to Asia. From 14 January 1949, Braathens SAFE received a five-year concession to operate a route from Oslo to various cities in Asia. This forced OSAS to plan its Asia-routes using only Swedish and Danish crew and planes and not operate from Oslo. This was followed by SAS on 26 October, when they opened a DC-6 route to Bangkok with seven intermediate stops. At first there were two round trips per month, but from 1950 this was increased to two per week.

== European Scandinavian Airlines System ==
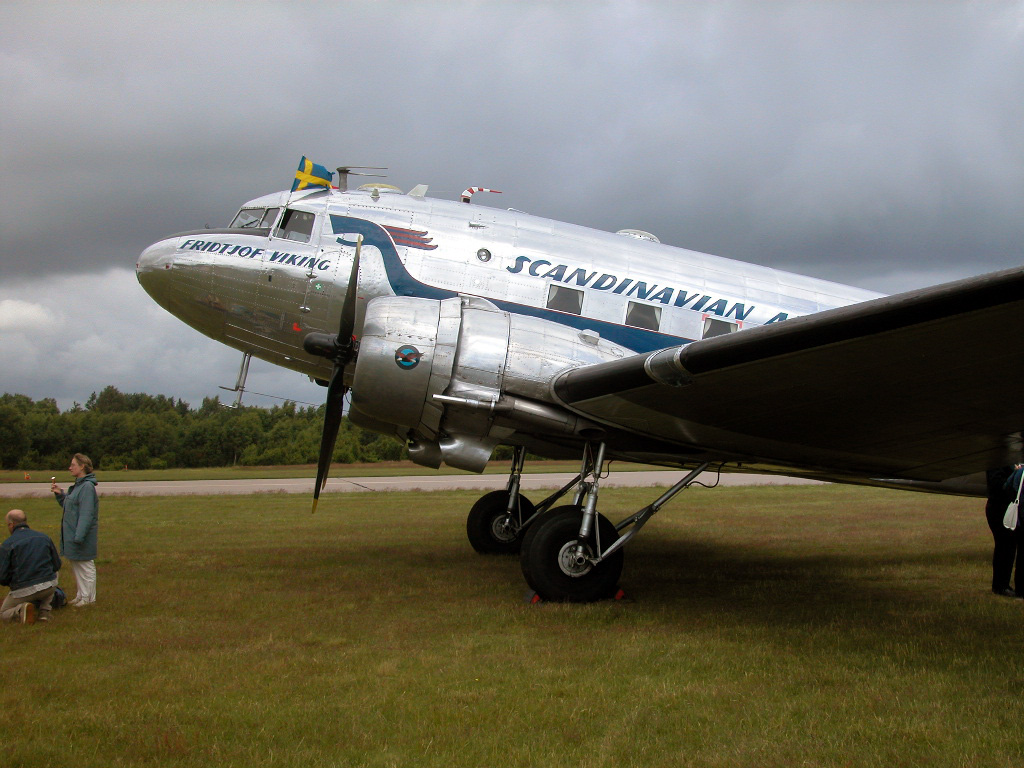
Heritage Douglas DC-3 operating in SAS livery

DDL, DNL and Aerotransport all had their respective national concessions for domestic and European routes. On intra-Scandinavian and internal European routes the companies operated in direct competition with each other. While SAS's New York route was profitable, the European operations were less so, and in 1947 Aerotransport lost SEK 1.1 million, DNL NOK 6 million and DDL DDK 3.3 million. In addition to sales offices in the other Scandinavian countries, each airline had its own office in cities served by each airline. That year, there were informal discussions to expand SAS to operate the European routes as well, but this proved impossible as long as SILA only held intercontinental concessions while Aerotransport held European and domestic concessions.

In August 1946, Torsten Nilsson suggested merging Aerotransport and SILA, but this had been rejected by both companies. A meeting was held on 28 May 1947 with the main owners of SILA, where Nilsson proposed a 50–50 state–private ownership in a merged company. While both parties saw the advantage of merging to rationalize operations, neither party was willing to let the other receive the chair. At the time, Aerotransport had just ordered ten DC-6 and was planning to start intercontinental flights to Africa and Asia. The minister appointed Torsten Nothin to lead a board to make a recommendation, and then negotiate with SILA's owners for a merger. One issue was that the Swedes perceived that the privately owned DDL and DNL would not agree with a nationalization of SILA. The Swedish government chose not to contact the two other social democratic Scandinavian governments about partially nationalizing their own flag carriers.

Following the tentative agreement for a merger in Sweden, negotiations to create a European branch of SAS started on 1 December 1947. It was agreed that the SAS-brand was to be used to brand all international flights as SAS. European SAS (ESAS) was, unlike the transatlantic agreement, only a business agreement, whereby the three companies agreed to pool their flights and operate a single set of facilities abroad. Each company would close its own operations and offices in the other two Scandinavian countries, leaving that to the national airline. In all European cities, only the best office and employees would remain, rationalizing operations and presenting the three airlines' operations under a single brand. ESAS was launched on 18 April 1948, and was led by a main committee and had Viggo J. Rasmussen as director. The head office and operational center for ESAS was located at Copenhagen Airport, in part because of a long-term mechanics strike at Bromma. At the same time, the SAS consortium was internally named Overseas SAS (OSAS).

Agreement for the merger between SILA and Aerotransport was reached, and passed by parliament on 14 May 1948, and realized on 1 July. The new company was named Aerotransport, took over SILA's ownership of SAS and received a share capital of SEK 50 million, of which the Government of Sweden owned 50%. Per A. Norlin was appointed CEO of Aerotransport, replacing Carl Florman. Per M. Backe was then hired as SAS' CEO.

ESAS and OSAS had a fleet consisting of sixteen DC-6, nine DC-4, thirty-nine DC-3, eleven C-47 Cargo, four Vickers VC.1 Viking and three Short Sandringham, plus four Stratocruisers and ten Saab Scandia under order. ESAS had two opposing goals: to operate the partner's aircraft along the 3–2–2 ratio, and operate them most rationally. Because of the diverse composition of the fleet, these goals were often impossible to combine. In 1948, DDL lost DDK 11.8 million, DNL lost NOK 17 million and Aerotransport lost SEK 10.7 million (18 months). OSAS was responsible for SEK 9.3 million between the three. Most of OSAS's deficit was due to the Bromma strike, which had hit operations from Stockholm and Oslo hard. DNL received NOK 35 million in capital from the state through loans.

While ESAS proved profitable for Aerotransport and DDL, it became a burden for DNL. The former two had a much closer overlap between their routes, while DNL had operated without direct competition with the other two on most of its routes. Instead of coordinating resources, ESAS had become another administrative level; there were also concerns from Norway that administrative and operative staff were leaking to the ESAS head office in Copenhagen and the OSAS head office in Stockholm, without any similar build-up of competence in Norway. Because of the way the costs were divided between the pool partners, DNL was also receiving smaller margins that the others.

== Merger ==
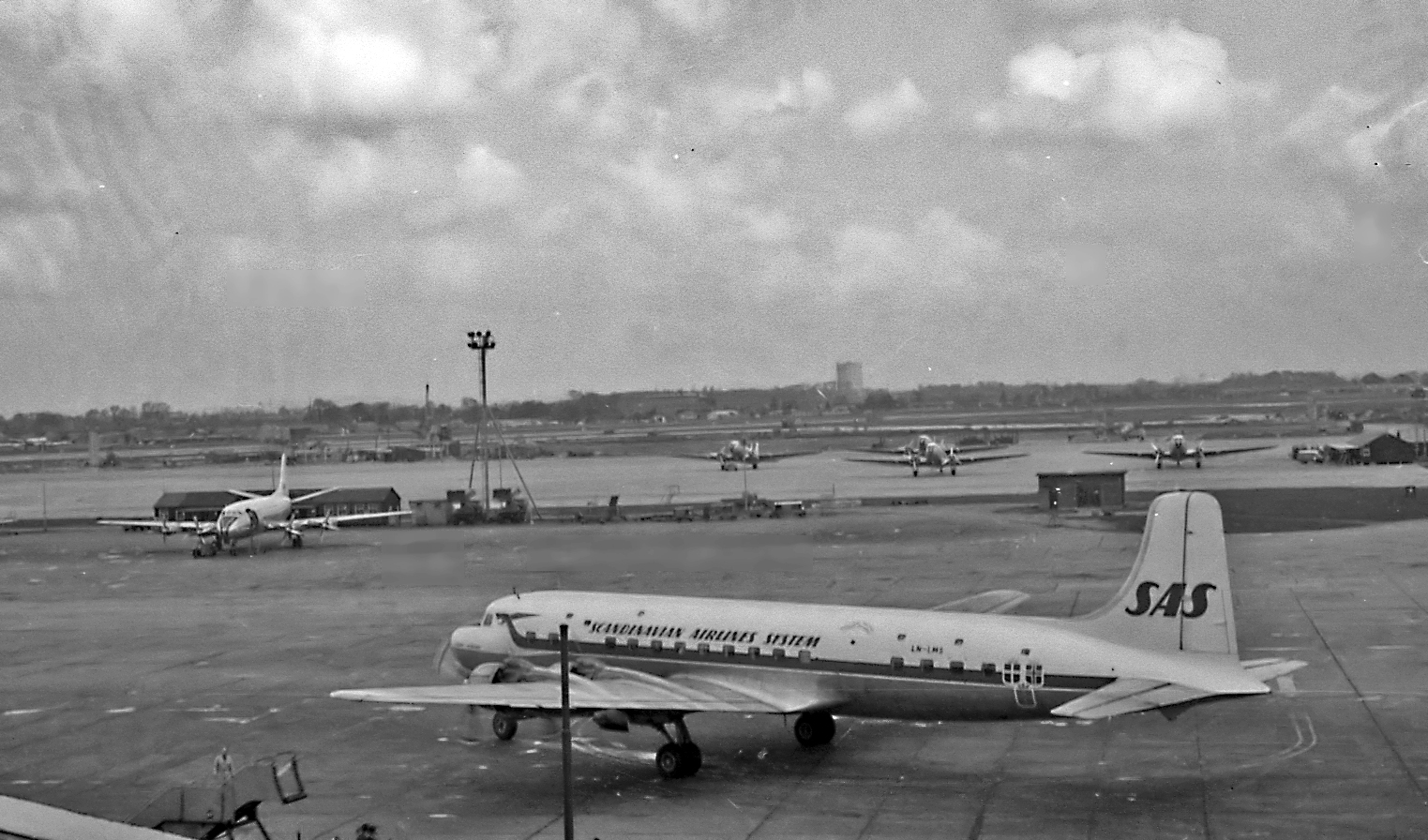
SAS Douglas DC-6 at London Heathrow Airport in 1960

In September 1949, the Norwegian Ministry of Transport and Communications announced that DNL would be forced to leave ESAS at the latest on 1 April 1950. To keep the cooperation going, a committee was established, consisting of Wallenberg, Kampmann and Einar Isdahl from DNL. It recommended a full merger of the OSAS, ESAS and the operative divisions of the three national airlines. SAS would be established as a multi-national consortium, and the three national airlines would remain as holding companies. The consortium would be exempt from taxation, although the liability would be passed on to the holding companies, who would also own the aircraft and all real estate in the respective countries. The aircraft would be leased to SAS, who would also take over all employees.

There were two main areas of disagreement. First was the location of the head office, which the Danish wanted located in Copenhagen and the Swedes wanted in Stockholm. Second was the distribution of technical facilities. While a single, large facility would give the lowest costs, the authorities in each country wanted to keep a large reserve of aircraft mechanics for the military. The committee also stated that a merged SAS would need to have identical concessions from all countries.

In 1949, OSAS gave a profit of SEK 31,000, but all the national airlines had losses, with Aerotransport losing most at SEK 10.7 million. In political circles, there was an increasing understanding that the Swedish model with an equal private and state ownership should be followed by DDL and DNL. At the time, the Danish state owned 17.6% of DDL, and the Norwegian state 20% of DNL. As both companies were in need of increased share capital, processes were started whereby both governments would purchase shares to increase their ownership to 50%. Both the Danish and the Norwegian states bought shares for NOK and DDK 14 million, respectively, while in Norway private investors bought for additional NOK 11 million.

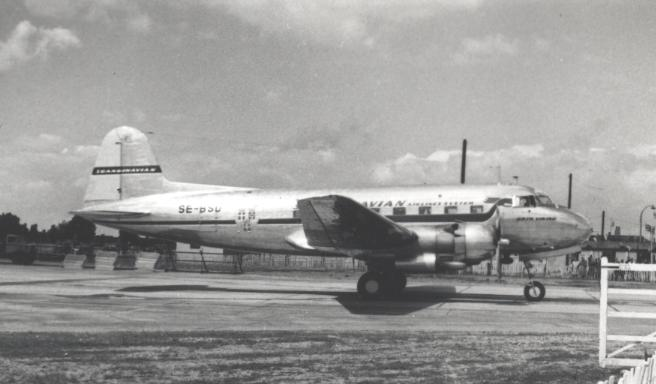
SAS Saab Scandia at London Heathrow Airport in 1953

The final negotiations were made in October 1950; it was agreed to locate the head office in Stockholm, while it was understood that the main hub would be Copenhagen Airport. Norway was left without a key asset, and the negotiators feared that Norwegian politicians would reject the merger if not granted additional benefits. It was therefore agreed that the allocation of maintenance facilities was to follow the 3–2–2 ratio, even if it would incur higher costs. The agreement was given a duration of 25 years. At the time, OSAS had seven DC-6 and one DC-3 used for training. ESAS had about 60 aircraft, including both DC-3, DC-4, DC-6, Sandringham, Vickers Viking, Saab Scandia and Ju 52.

When passed in the Parliament of Denmark, the agreement received 77 against 14 votes in the Folketing, and with only one opposing vote in the Landsting. The opposing votes were cast by members of the Justice Party, who were principally opposed to state the state owning any companies, and the Communist Party, who were opposed to the private ownership. In Norway, there were supporters and opponents in all the parties. The debate took ten hours, and even among those who were in favor were skeptical. The proposal passed with 107 against 26 votes. The proposal was passed unanimously by the Parliament of Sweden.

The final agreement was signed on 8 February 1951 at the same location as the former, in the head office of the Norwegian Shipowners' Association in Oslo. It was made retroactively valid from 1 October 1950, giving OSAS a profit of SEK 4.2 million in the first three quarters of 1950. OSAS had then made 2641 flights across the North Atlantic, 657 across the South Atlantic and 64 to the Far East, transporting 130,000 without accidents. From OSAS, 1,076 were transferred, along with 5,554 people from the national airlines and ESAS. The company had a capital of SEK 157 million (DDK 210 million or NOK 217 million), 59 aircraft and 6630 employees. Norlin was appointed CEO, deputized by Backe and Rasmussen.
