= OSAS =

OSAS or Osas may refer to:

- Osas Ighodaro, a Nigerian actress
- Sleep Apnea - Obstructive Sleep Apnea Syndrome
- Eternal security - "Once Saved, Always Saved" (a common expression, with the relative acronym OSAS) a soteriological doctrine of the Protestant Christian faith.
- Overseas Scandinavian Airlines System, see History of Scandinavian Airlines System (pre-1952)
