= Oslo Airport (disambiguation) =

Oslo Airport may refer to:

- Oslo Airport, Gardermoen, serving Oslo and Eastern Norway for domestic and international flights since 1998
- Oslo Airport, Fornebu, formerly serving Oslo for domestic and international flights from 1939 to 1998
- Gressholmen Airport, formerly serving Oslo for seaplane flights from 1927 to 1939
- Kjeller Airport, formerly serving Oslo for land flights from 1912 to 1939, currently in use for general aviation
- Moss Airport, Rygge, formerly serving Oslo and Eastern Norway mainly for international flights from 2008 to 2016
- Sandefjord Airport, Torp, serving Eastern Norway for international and domestic flights since 1957
- The Oslo Airport localization controversy, a major debate involving the placement of main airports serving Oslo.
