= Kvitbjørn disaster =

1947 aviation accident

Coordinates: 68°25′59″N 15°59′43″E

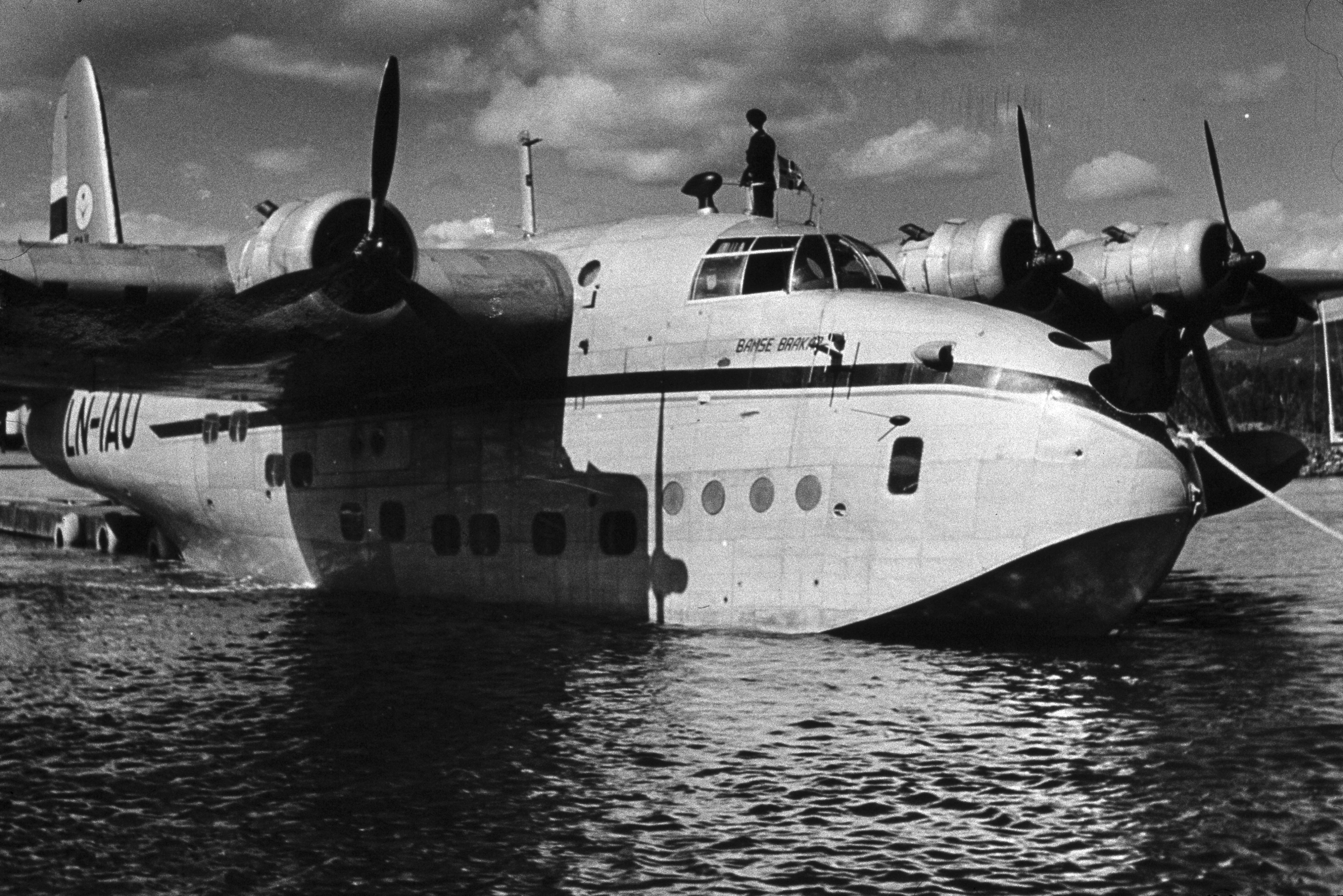
- A Short Sandringham similar to the accident aircraft

Accident
- Date: 28 August 1947
- Summary: Controlled flight into terrain
- Site: Lødingen, Hinnøya, Norway

Aircraft
- Aircraft type: Shorts S.25 Sandringham 6
- Operator: Det Norske Luftfartsselskap (DNL)
- Registration: LN-IAV
- Flight origin: Tromsø
- 1st stopover: Harstad
- 2nd stopover: Bodø
- Destination: Oslo
- Passengers: 28
- Crew: 7
- Fatalities: 35
- Survivors: 0

The Kvitbjørn disaster occurred on 28 August 1947 when, in heavy fog, the Norwegian Air Lines Short Sandringham flying boat Kvitbjørn, registered LN-IAV, hit the mountain Kvammetinden about 1.5 kilometres (0.93 mi) north of the village of Lødingen in Lødingen Municipality in Nordland county, Norway.

The flying boat flew into the side of the mountain at an altitude of 290 meters in route from Harstad to Bodø, the two stopovers between its origin Tromsø Airport and destination Oslo. All thirty-five people on board (twenty-eight passengers and a crew of seven) perished, making the crash the deadliest in Norwegian aviation at that time.
