= 1939 Pan Am Sikorsky S-43 crash =

Aviation incident in Brazil

Seaplane Baby Clipper NC 16933 Crash
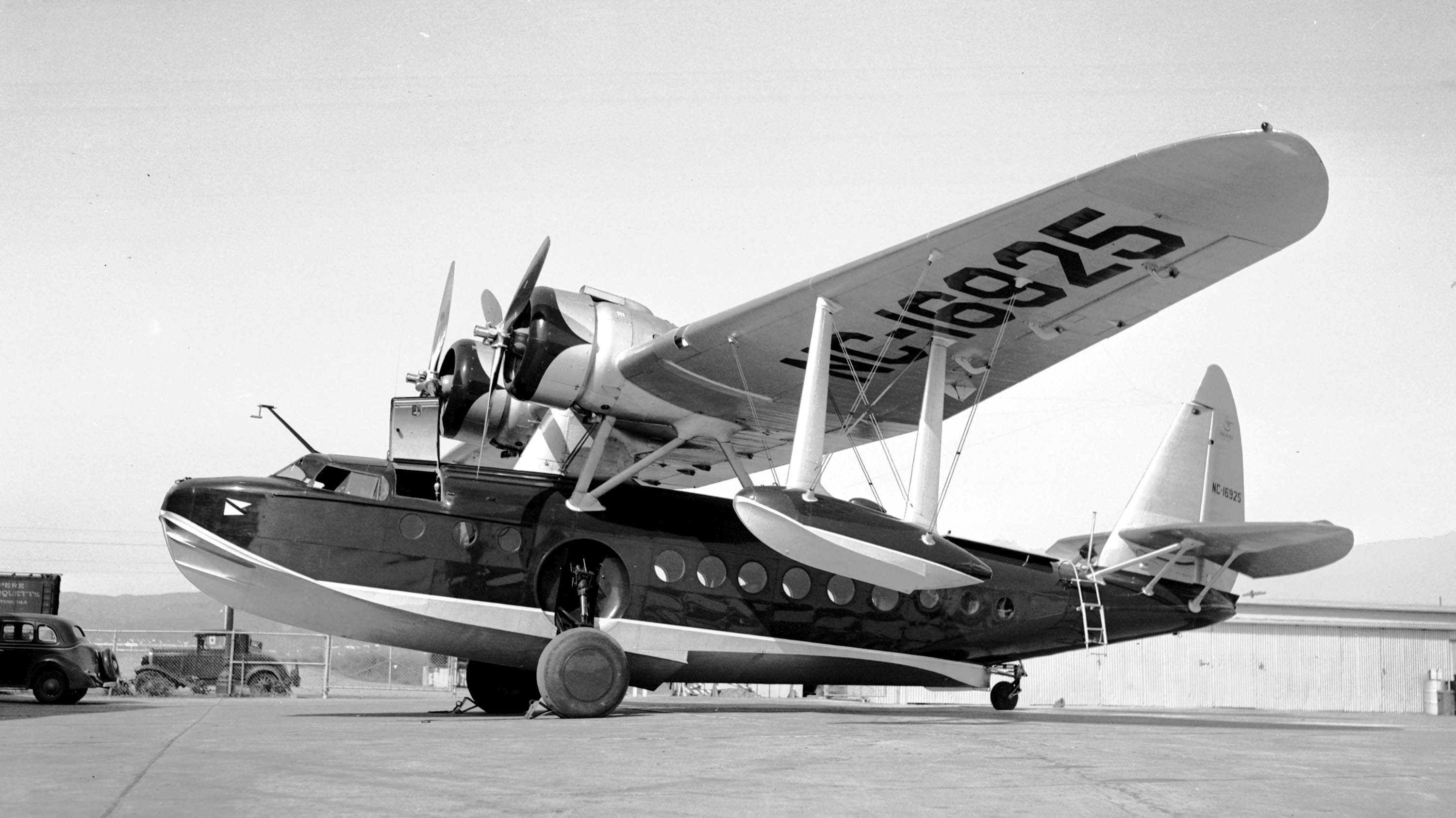
- A Sikorsky S-43

Accident
- Date: August 13, 1939
- Summary: Engine failure resulting in a loss of control
- Site: Guanabara Bay, Rio de Janeiro, Brazil; 22°53′38.59″S 43°9′51.53″W

Aircraft
- Aircraft type: Sikorsky S-43B
- Operator: Pan Am
- Registration: NC16933
- Flight origin: Pan American Field (present-day Miami International Airport), Miami, Florida, U.S.
- Destination: Santos Dumont Airport, Rio de Janeiro, Brazil
- Passengers: 12
- Crew: 4
- Fatalities: 14
- Survivors: 2

The Seaplane Baby Clipper NC 16933 crash took place in Rio de Janeiro on August 13, 1939. The aircraft, owned by Pan Am, was flying Miami–Rio, with stops in the cities of Antilla, Port-au-Prince, San Pedro de Macorís, San Juan, Port of Spain, Georgetown, Paramaribo, Cayenne, Belém, São Luís, Fortaleza, Natal, João Pessoa, Recife, Maceió, Aracaju, Salvador, Caravelas and Vitória. This would be the first accident involving a Pan Am aircraft in Brazil.

== Aircraft ==
The Sikorsky S-43 was a Flying Boat seaplane. Pan Am would order 10 units, which would be used on routes connecting the United States to the Caribbean and Latin America. The aircraft involved in the accident was manufactured at the Sikorsky Aircraft Industrial Plant in Bridgeport, Connecticut. It was assigned the serial number "4324". Construction would be finished on December 20, 1936. After being flight-tested and approved, it would receive tail number NC 16933 from the Civil Aeronautics Authority. These aircraft would be christened Baby Clipper by Pan Am. The Baby Clippers began service at Pan Am on September 10, 1937, and would be retired in 1945.

== Flight history ==
The aircraft involved was a three-year-old Sikorsky S-43B airliner registered NC16933. It had first flown in 1936, and had accumulated a total of 3,650 flight hours during its career.

The aircraft took off from Miami on a scheduled international passenger flight to Rio de Janeiro, with many stopovers across the Caribbean and South America. As it neared its destination, the aircraft circled Rio in preparation for a normal approach. As it was circling, however, the left engine lost power, putting the aircraft into a descending left yaw turn. As the yaw grew sharper, the pitch angle also steepened until the aircraft struck a caisson and crashed into Guanabara Bay, about one kilometer (0.62 mi) from Rio's Santos Dumont Airport. Of the twelve passengers and four crew members, only two passengers survived.
