= Bukken Bruse disaster =

Norwegian aircraft crash in 1948

Coordinates: 63°25′05″N 10°47′33″E

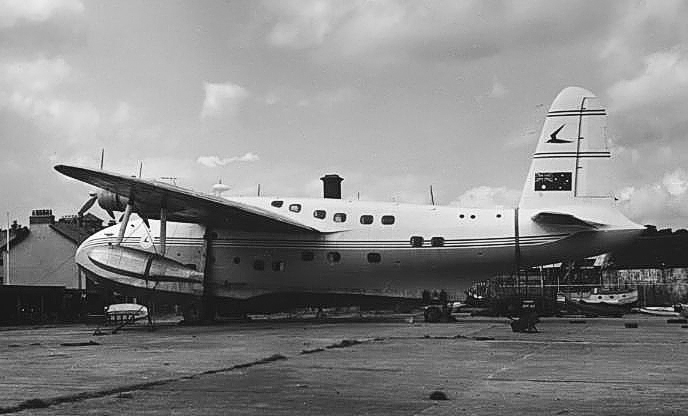
- A Short Sandringham similar to the aircraft involved in the accident

Accident
- Date: 2 October 1948
- Summary: Loss of control while landing
- Site: Hommelvik, Malvik Municipality, Norway

Aircraft
- Aircraft type: Short S.25 Sandringham 5
- Aircraft name: Bukken Bruse
- Operator: Det Norske Luftfartselskap (DNL)
- Registration: LN-IAW
- Flight origin: Oslo-Fornebu Airport
- Destination: Trondheim-Hommelvika
- Passengers: 38
- Crew: 5
- Fatalities: 19
- Survivors: 26

The Bukken Bruse disaster was the crash of a flying boat during its landing on 2 October 1948. The Short Sandringham was on a Norwegian domestic flight from Oslo and was landing in the bay adjacent to Hommelvik near the city of Trondheim. The disaster killed 19 people; among the 26 survivors was the philosopher Bertrand Russell.

== Aircraft ==
The flying boat was a Short Sandringham, registration LN-IAW and named Bukken Bruse after the fairy tale "The Three Billy Goats Gruff". The aircraft, operated by Det Norske Luftfartsselskap (now a part of Scandinavian Airlines System) was en route from Oslo's Fornebu Airport.

== Crash ==
The weather in the area of the landing was poor at the time, and the sea in the bay of Hommelvika was foaming white. When the Sandringham was about to touch down on the water, it was hit by a wind gust; the pilots lost control and the right wing float broke off as it hit the water. The aircraft rolled over to the side and its nose ploughed into the water.

The fuselage rapidly filled with water. Of the 45 people on board, 19 perished. The survivors were all in the smoking compartment at the back of the cabin, near the emergency exit.

=== Bertrand Russell's account ===
The 76-year-old philosopher Bertrand Russell was on the flight on his way to give a lecture to the local student society. He was seated at the rear of the smoking compartment. In an interview with Trondheim newspaper Adresseavisen the day after the crash, he said that he was uncertain of what was happening after the jerk until the aircraft tipped over and water rushed in. In his autobiography he wrote that he had made sure to get a seat in the smoking compartment before the flight, saying that "If I cannot smoke, I should die". Russell was hospitalized in a Trondheim hospital.

== Cause ==
The investigation found that the crash was caused by the pilot's loss of control during his attempt to land the Sandringham in a crosswind and rough seas with limited space available.

== See also ==
- Aviation in Norway
