= Norwegian Air Lines =

Norwegian airline

Det Norske Luftfartselskap
IATA	ICAO	Call sign
SK	DNL	SCANDINAVIAN
- Founded: 16 October 1933
- Commenced operations: 11 June 1935
- Ceased operations: 8 February 1951
- Hubs: Oslo Airport, Gressholmen (1935–39); Oslo Airport, Fornebu (1939–51)
- Secondary hubs: Kristiansand Airport, Kjevik (1946–51); Stavanger Airport, Sola (1946–51)
- Alliance: Scandinavian Airlines System
- Fleet size: 13 (1951)
- Parent company: Norwegian Ministry of Transport and Communications (50%)
- Headquarters: Oslo, Norway
- Key people: Bernt Balchen (CEO)

Det Norske Luftfartselskap A/S (literally "The Norwegian Aviation Company") or DNL, trading internationally as Norwegian Air Lines, was an airline and flag carrier of Norway. Founded in 1927, it operated domestic and international routes from 1935 to 1941 and from 1946 to 1951. It became one of the three founders of Scandinavian Airlines System (SAS) and became one of its three holding companies from 1951, with a 28% stake and listed on the Oslo Stock Exchange. DNL was renamed SAS Norge ASA in 1996 and was merged in 2001 to create the SAS Group.

The company was founded as Det Norske Luftfartselskap Fred. Olsen A/S in 1933, after Fred. Olsen & Co. took over the assets of a failed airline with the same name from 1927. After taking over the incumbent Widerøe the following year, allowing five other shipping companies a partial ownership and changing the company's name to Det Norske Luftfartselskap Fred. Olsen & Bergenske A/S, DNL started domestic seaplane routes based at Oslo Airport, Gressholmen, and later Oslo Airport, Fornebu, using Junkers Ju 52 aircraft. In 1935, DNL was close to starting transatlantic flights in cooperation with Pan Am, but services never commenced despite purchasing a Sikorsky S-43 flying boat. After the outbreak of World War II, DNL ceased operations from 1941 to 1946.

From then, DNL started international flights using Douglas DC-3 and introduced Short Sandringhams on domestic sea routes. Along with Aerotransport of Sweden and Det Danske Luftfartselskab of Denmark, DNL founded Overseas Scandinavian Airlines System to pool transatlantic flights. In 1948, all of DNL's services were re-branded as SAS and pooled through European Scandinavian Airlines System. The company experienced four fatal accidents.

== History ==
=== Establishment ===
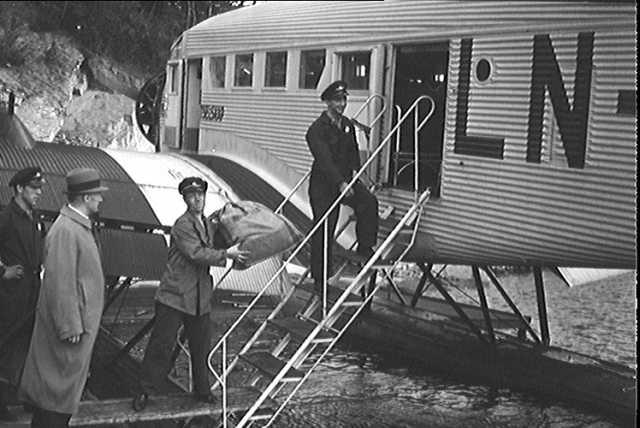
Boarding of a Junkers Ju 52 at Gressholmen Airport in 1936

The first DNL was registered on 4 May 1927, with a share capital of NOK 6,500, with Arnold Ræstad and the main shareholder. On 18 June, the share capital was raised to NOK 50,000, including a 20% stake owned by the Municipality of Oslo and Norway Post. At the time, the only service to Norway was Lufthansa, who operated from Gressholmen Airport in Oslo via Gothenburg and Copenhagen to Warnemünde in Germany. Both DNL and Norske Luftruter applied for ground handling for Lufthansa at Gressholmen. This was granted to Norske Luftruter, but DNL was granted the concession to operate the ferry to the island from Oslo East Station.

In 1930, the government appointed a civil aviation commission, led by Admiral von der Lippe, to consider all aspects of civil aviation in Norway. It concluded in 1932, and recommended that a single, large national airline be established. The same year, the Municipality of Oslo and the Norwegian Ministry of Defence appointed a committee with the goal of building a civilian airport near Oslo. It concluded in June, and recommended that the airport be built at Fornebu. By 1934, construction had started, although the airport would not open until 1 June 1939.

On 1 September 1933, the Oslo-based shipping company Fred. Olsen & Co., owned by the brothers Thomas Fredrik Olsen and Rudolf Olsen, announced their plans to establish a national airline. The foundation of the company was made on 16 October 1933, with Thomas Olsen, Rudolf Olsen, Johan L. Müller, Ganger Rolf and Bonheur—all within the Fred. Olsen sphere—as owners. The airline was established with a share capital of NOK 750,000 and took over the former DNL. The new company was named Det Norske Luftfartselskap Fred. Olsen A/S and hired Hjalmar Riiser-Larsen—since 1921 director of the Civil Aviation Council—as managing director. The Olsen brothers and Müller were all elected to the board. The company's initial plans were to gain the operating rights for the airports which were under construction, including Fornebu; Kristiansand Airport, Kjevik; and Stavanger Airport, Sola. The other was receive a state grant to start a service from Oslo, via Kristiansand, to Amsterdam in cooperation with KLM. Domestically, the airline wanted to operate the route from Oslo to Kristiansand and from Kristiansand to Stavanger, Bergen and Ålesund.

An application was sent the government, at the time Mowinckel's Third Cabinet, with a proposal for a ten-year concessions using land planes. Routes were to start off with a five-month service, and gradually increase to a full-year service from 1940. The company stated that it needed NOK 500,000 annually in support from the state and Norway Post for the service. In 1933, the brothers Viggo Widerøe and Arild Widerøe—who would found Widerøe in 1934—also applied for routes in the same areas, but using sea planes on the route from Oslo via Kristiansand and Stavanger to Haugesund. Also Norske Luftruter applied, but a three-year concession was granted to Widerøe. The government stated that no airports had been built yet, and would not be in the immediate future, so it was better to start with sea plane services.

Riiser-Larsen went on a national lecture tour to gain support for civil aviation from local politicians and businesspeople. He also negotiated agreements to pool flights to Sweden with Aerotransport, to Denmark with Det Danske Luftfartselskab, to Germany with Lufthansa and to the United Kingdom with Imperial Airways. By early 1934, DNL decided that they would instead apply for initial seaplane routes using two Waco Cabin. During the debates in parliament, the minority governing Liberal Party was in favor of Widerøe-operated sea plane routes, while the majority opposition from the Agrarian Party and the Labor Party wanted to increase investments in land airports.

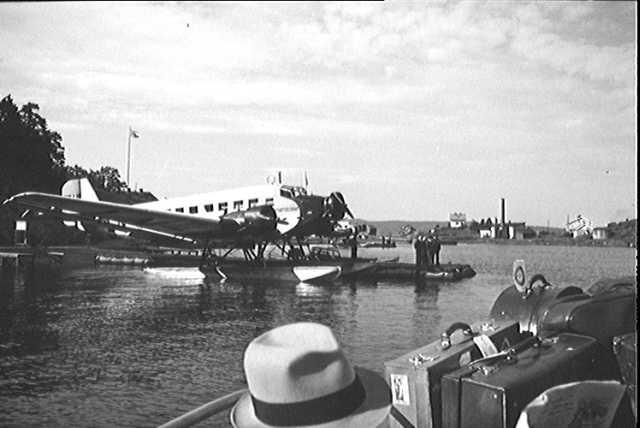
A Junkers Ju 52 docked at Gressholmen Airport in 1936

In 1933, Thomas S. Falck was appointed director of Bergenske Dampskibsselskab (BDS). Fred. Olsen wanted a partner for DNL, in part to strengthen its geographic spread, and meetings were held between Olsen family and Falck to introduce the Bergen-based company as a partner in DNL. On 7 November 1934, Bergenske became a partner in DNL, and the company renamed Det Norske Luftfartselskap Fred. Olsen og Bergenske A/S. Johan Wulfsberg from BDS became a board member of DNL. As a reply to DNL's new concession application to make short-term sea plane routes using a Junkers Ju 52, the government urged DNL to make an alliance or merger with Widerøe. By then, four regional shipping companies—Vesterålske, Nordenfjeldske, Stavangerske and Arendalske—had bought the majority of Widerøe.

Falck took contact with the other four shipping companies, and on 18 December the six shipping companies agreed to merge their interests into DNL. Ownership was split 40% by Fred. Olsen, 38% by Bergenske and 22% by the other four shipping companies. Widerøe was initially planned to be either dissolved or take over the smaller seaplane routes. The state was permitted to appoint a member of the schedule planning committee. The company received a share capital of NOK 1.6 million. DNL bought 51% of Widerøe, and the airline continued without scheduled services, operating air taxi, school and general aviation, plus a limited number of post routes in Northern Norway.

On 16 March 1935, Mowinckel's Third Cabinet was replaced by the Labor Nygaardsvold's Cabinet. They wanted to stimulate the economy through public investments, and decided that construction of airports was to be accelerated. On 5 April, DNL was granted concession for a sea plane route along the coast from Oslo to Tromsø, plus the international route from Oslo via Kristiansand to Amsterdam. DNL received NOK 200,000 in state grants, plus NOK 100,000 from Norway Post, for the first year of operation. DNL decided to purchase a three-engine Junkers W 34. It was registered as LN-DAB on 1 June 1935 and named Ternen. Riiser-Larsen and Bernt Balchen were hired to manage the company, while marketing and sales were done by Fred. Olsen. Terje Rabben was employed to run the DNL operations from the base at Gressholmen.

=== Pre-war operations ===
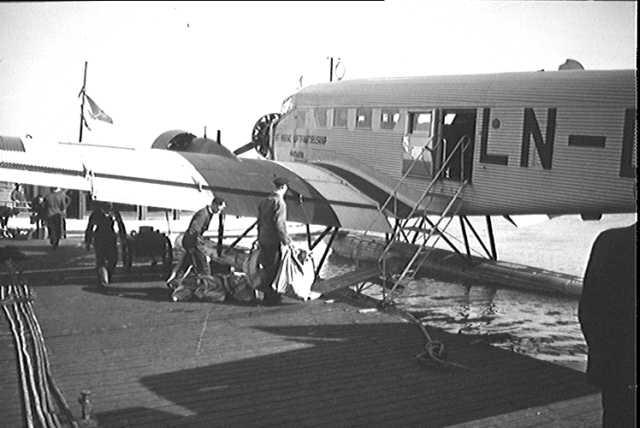
Loading of a Junkers Ju 52 at Gressholmen Airport in 1936

To start the route from Oslo to Bergen immediately, a Ju 52 was wet leased from Lufthansa. It was delivered on 7 June and initially kept the blue Lufthansa livery, including a swastika. The aircraft was registered as LN-DAE, christened Havørn and later received DNL's livery. Operations were scheduled to commence on 7 June, but fog forced a delay until 11 June. After that there were flown 180 trips with a 100% regularity. Training was done by German crew on board Havørn. Travel time from Oslo to Bergen was four and a half hours, with intermediate stops in Moss, Arendal, Kristiansand, Stavanger, and Haugesund. It cost NOK 95 to fly the full journey. During the first season, DNL transported 3,214 passengers and 31.6 tonnes (31.1 long tons; 34.8 short tons) of mail. It also took over Norwegian representation for Aerotransport, DDL, KLM, Sabena, Air France and Aero, and joined the International Air Traffic Association. At the end of the year, Havørn was purchased. On 6 June 1936, DNL registered its second Ju 52, LN-DAF Najaden. After the Havørn Accident eleven days later, the airline purchased another Ju 52, LN-DAH Falken, used from Lufthansa.

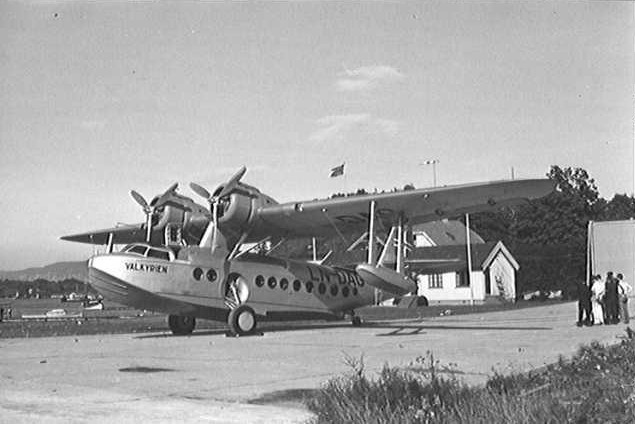
The Sikorsky S-43 Valkyrien at Oslo Airport, Gressholmen in 1936

In 1936, DNL and Balchen—who had a wide range of contacts in the US—started negotiations with Pan American Airways (Pan Am) about cooperation on a transatlantic route between Norway and the United States. DNL argued that Norway's location made it an ideal base for the European flights to North America. Pan Am would operate from New York to Reykjavík, while DNL would operate the service from Reykjavík to Bergen and onwards to various destinations in Europe. The contract was signed in March and DNL bought a Sikorsky S-43 flying boat, registered as LN-DAG and christened Valkyrien. However, after the aircraft was delivered and three weeks before the route was to be inaugurated, Pan Am changed their mind, canceled the agreement and decided that the transatlantic route should instead operate via Newfoundland to Foynes in Ireland, and via the Azores in the winter. Valkyrien was instead used on domestic routes.

During the second season, DNL increased the routes to also include Bergen–Tromsø and Tromsø–Honningsvåg. A night post route was flown from Oslo to Gothenburg. During the five months of operation, the airline flew 339,116 kilometres (210,717 mi) and transported 2,300 passengers. From 1937, the state received the right to appoint two of the company's eight board members. That year also saw DNL start its first international route, when Valkyrien was started the route between Oslo and Stockholm. Part of the reason for the route was that transport to the Soviet Union could not go via Germany, where the only contemporary international flights from Oslo went. However, the Stockholm-service was not profitable, and terminated on 31 July. Stavanger Airport, Sola opened on 30 May, but with only a single land airport, no routes were started by DNL. In cooperation with DDL, Lufthansa and ABA, DNL entered the pool that flew the route from Oslo via Gothenburg to Copenhagen.

On 2 March 1938, the board of DNL decided to sell Valkyrien to Chargeurs Reunis and abandon plans for intercontinental traffic. Instead, negotiations started with Aer Rianta of Ireland, who were cooperating with Pan Am on the transatlantic route; DNL, DDL, Aero and Aerotransport planned to start a route from Foynes via Stavanger, Oslo and Stockholm to Moscow. However, Pan Am decided to move the route to the Azores when it commenced in 1939 and DNL's Shannon-plans were terminated. Following this, the Nordic airlines started negotiating the possibility of cooperating on their own transatlantic route via Iceland and Newfoundland. In 1940, a delegation was sent to the United States, where it negotiated the necessary permissions from the American authorities and purchase rights for aircraft. After the break-out of World War II, the United States had become more interested in a northern transatlantic route, so it could reach the neutral Scandinavian countries.

Oslo Airport, Fornebu opened on 1 June 1939, and later the same month so did Kristiansand Airport, Kjevik. DNL had made arrangements to pool the operations from Oslo via Kristiansand to Amsterdam with KLM. The route was initially operated with a Douglas DC-2, leased from KLM. DNL had discussed cooperating with British Airways and extending the Amsterdam-route to London, but this was not done.

=== World War II ===
After the German invasion of Norway on 9 April 1940, all international routes and operations in Southern Norway were terminated. Two aircraft were requisitioned by the German forces and sent to Germany. A limited service was kept in Northern Norway during the resistance, but also these were terminated after the German forces took control of the whole country. From 26 September, three weekly services were operated from Trondheim to Tromsø, with two of these continuing to Kirkenes, using Najaden. This was terminated on 20 March, after most of DNL's pilots had fled to the United Kingdom to support the allied forces.

The airline suffered from a general mistrust both from the German and Allied authorities. The Germans generally did not trust any shipowners, since these had their fleet organized in Nortraship and used in Allied convoys. The Norwegian authorities in exile were also distrustful of DNL, because the airline had taken initiative to operate a route, essentially helping the German forces. There was also an uncertainty as to whether the national airline of Norway should continue to be private, or if a state-owned airline should be established. To look at the issue, the Norwegian authorities-in-exile established the Norwegian Civil Aviation Board to look at all matters regarding civil aviation. It was this board which was permitted to negotiate traffic rights with other countries, make purchase rights of aircraft and participated in the foundation of the International Air Transport Association and the International Civil Aviation Organization. The Swedish intercontinental airline, Svensk Interkontinental Lufttrafik managed to purchase ten Douglas DC-4 at the end of the war; they had initially planned on selling some to DDL and DNL, but were not permitted to negotiate any agreements with DNL.

=== Reestablishment ===
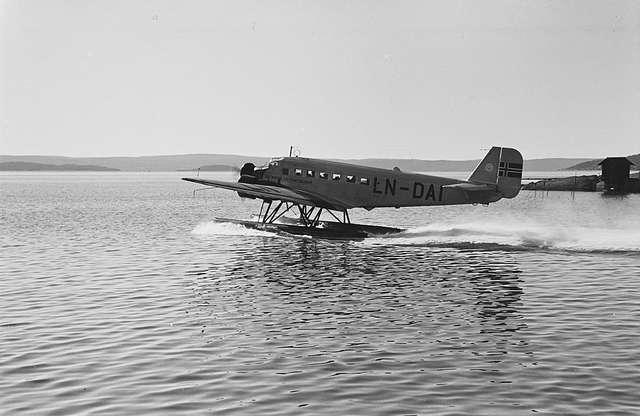
A Junkers Ju 52 taking off at Oslo Airport, Fornebu in 1939

After the liberation of Norway on 8 May 1945, the Norwegian Civil Aviation Board started to initiate operations of civilian airliners. For 1945, the task was given to the Royal Norwegian Air Force, who used surplus aircraft to operate a limited number of routes. At the same time, Thomas Olsen and Thomas Falck started mobilizing among shipowners and other businesspeople to raise capital for DNL, while at the same time trying to ensure the employment of military pilots, navigation officers and other people with aviation competence. Egil Gløersen was sent to the United States to study the operations of United Airlines and Northwest Airlines. On a meeting on 17 July, Norway's nine largest shipping companies agreed to raise NOK 15 to 20 million in share capital, and the company to join IATA.

The task of making a recommendation for a permanent solution for the national airline was given to a new Civil Aviation Board, which had Falck as a board member. They came with their recommendation on 28 November 1945, which favored a single, privately owned Norwegian flag carrier, with a broad ownership, who would receive a concession for the operation of all domestic and international routes. Following the 1945 Norwegian parliamentary election on 8 October, the Labor Party received a majority, with 76 of 150 seats. Also the Norwegian Communist Party did its best election ever, receiving 11 seats. A proposition was made by the Ministry of Defense on 18 January 1946, and sent to parliament. It discussed several options, such as creating a government agency or a state-owned limited company, permitting several airlines to operate the different routes, and looked at the possibility that the shipowners were purchasing DNL shares to hinder competition with their shipping lines. It concluded with a part private, part state-owned company was preferred, and that the state should purchase shares for NOK 5 million. While the Labor Party at the time was in favor of nationalization, the proposition stated that this was a possibility to limit the state's spending of dearly needed capital.

By then, the Civil Aviation Board had procured two DC-4 for NOK 7.7 million, which would be transferred to DNL. From 21 January, an interim board was appointed for DNL, led by Falck. When the proposition reached parliament, it was decided that the share capital in the company should be raised to between NOK 25 and 30 million to insure more owners, since the original NOK 15 million had already been sold. The cabinet was also granted permission to at their discretion purchase shares for an addition NOK 5 million. A 20-year concession was granted to DNL by parliament on 15 February.

In February, DNL procured a four-story building in Oslo City Center, and continued and a hangar at Fornebu. The company started to acquire offices in the various cities it was going to serve; within a few weeks of parliament's decision, DNL had 300 employees, and by June it reached 1,500, with an average age of 27 years. The company had ordered three Douglas DC-3 and two DC-4. On 27 March, public sales of shares started, which raised an additional NOK 3.7 million from 1,900 purchasers. Total share capital was NOK 25.2 million, with the state owning 20%, Fred. Olsen and Bergenske 10% each. In total, 49% of the shares were owned by shipping companies, 19.5% by banks, insurance, trade and industrial companies, and 12% by individuals. At least 75% of the company had to be owned by the state, Norwegian citizens or companies controlled by Norwegians. All the major shipping companies supported DNL with capital, except Wilh. Wilhelmsen, who wanted to focus on shipping, and Ludvig G. Braathen, who founded his own airline, Braathens SAFE, which was intended to be a charter airline, and later became SAS's main Norwegian competitor.

Det Norske Luftfartselskap A/S was founded on 2 July 1946; it took the name, part of the personnel and the agreements and arrangements DNL had. Det Norske Luftfartselskap Fred. Olsen & Bergenske was bought by Fred. Olsen, and became Fred Olsen Air Transport (Fred. Olsen Flyselskap). That company received the rights to seek compensation for any requisitions and other costs incurred by the German invasion.

=== Post-war operations ===
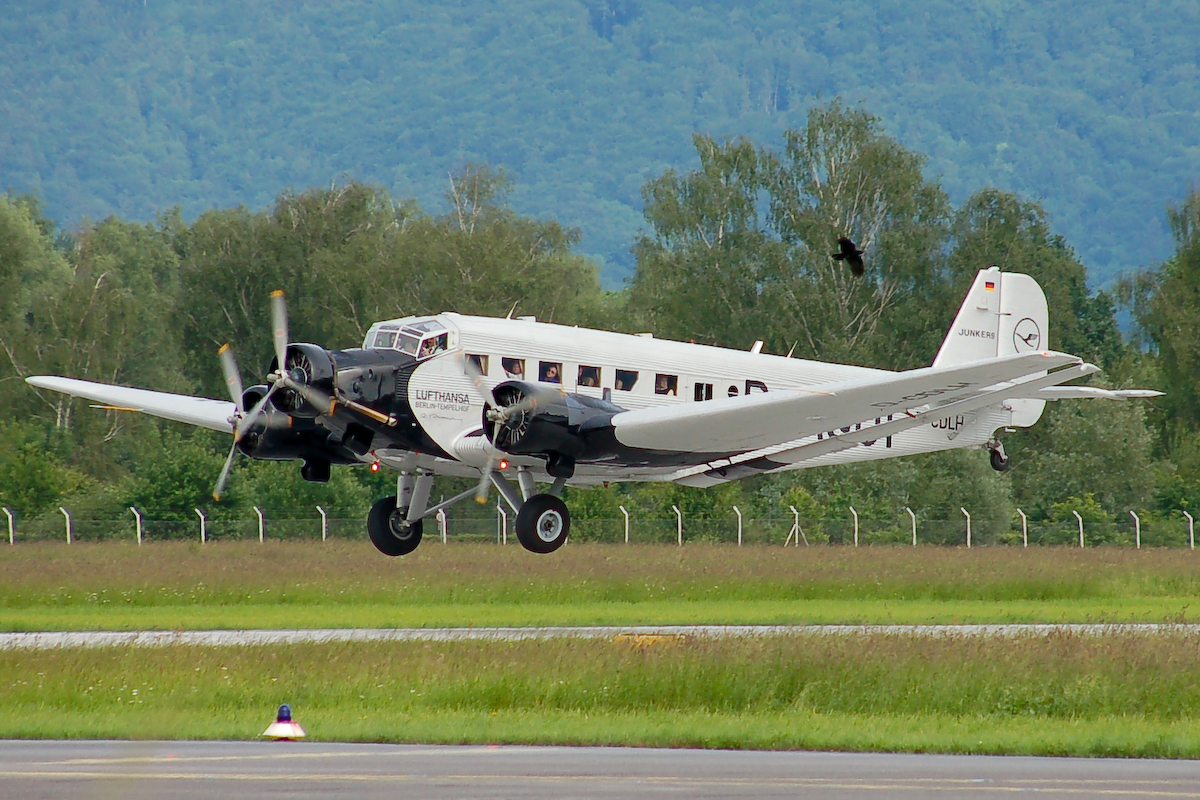
Falken has been preserved and is now the world's oldest airworthy Junkers Ju 52, albeit flying in Lufthansa livery

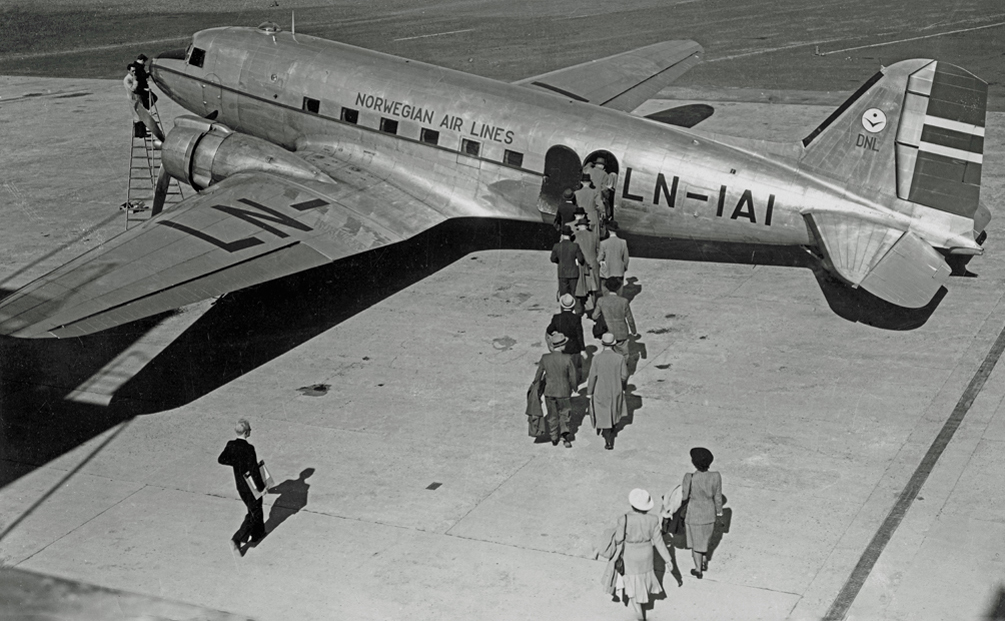
Passengers boarding a Norwegian Air Lines (DNL) Douglas DC-3 at Fornebu airport, Oslo in 1946.

Operations started on 1 April 1946, from Oslo to Copenhagen. Eight days later, the route from Oslo via Stavanger to London opened, and on 15 April from Oslo to Stockholm, and on the same day, some of the Copenhagen routes started stopping in Gothenburg. the route to Copenhagen was extended from Copenhagen to Zürich and Marseille on 29 April. On 22 May, 13 people were killed in an accident at Fornebu. The first domestic route, from Trondheim to Tromsø, opened on 27 May, followed by a route from Tromsø to Kirkenes on 13 October. In October, several new routes opened, including the reopening of the Stockholm route via Örebro and Karlstad in Sweden, to Kristiansand via Amsterdam and Brussels to Paris, from Bergen via Haugesund and Stavanger to Kristiansand, an extension of the Copenhagen route to Prague, and finally from Oslo to Stavanger. In 1946, DNL transported 47,112 passengers.

The initial postwar fleet consisted of six Douglas DC-3, all converted from military C-47. Five Junkers Ju 52 seaplanes were used, based on ten aircraft left by the German forces. Two of these, Najaden and Falken (renamed Veslefrikk and Askeladden, respectively), had been used by DNL before the war. On 16 July, the board decided to purchase three Sandringham Mark VI flying boats from Short Brothers. There were internal protests against the purchase of the Sandringhams, since they were regarded as unsuited for Norway. They incurred high operating costs and all three of the original aircraft crashed within four years. The land DC-3s were used on international routes, while the sea planes were used on domestic routes.

=== Overseas Scandinavian Airlines System ===
Route map of OSAS after the establishment

Negotiations between DNL, DDL and Aerotransport to consolidate their transatlantic operations started on 2 February 1946. Svensk Interkontinental Lufttrafik had started services from Stockholm to New York, but a consortium was discussed whereby the three airlines would pool their operations to create economy of scale. Disagreement existed over which airport should be used as a hub. The Swedish government did not want to participate with less than a 50% share, and preferably as a majority owner. It was stated that this was because they had half the population and the only organization capable of operating intercontinental routes. On 1 August, Overseas Scandinavian Airlines System was established, where DNL received a 2/7 ownership. The consortium received its head office in Stockholm, but would also serve Copenhagen and Oslo with intercontinental flights.

The agreement meant that DNL had to transfer employees to Stockholm and the airline made its two DC-4 aircraft available for SAS. To begin with, Oslo received one of the two weekly services to Gander and New York, but all traffic from Norway had to transfer in Copenhagen for the service to South America.

In 1946, Norwegian ship-owner Ludvig G. Braathen had establish Braathens SAFE, and started charter traffic, mainly to Asia. From 14 January 1949, Braathens SAFE received a five-year concession to operate a route from Oslo to various cities in Asia. This forced OSAS to plan its Asia-routes using only Swedish and Danish crew and planes, and not operate from Oslo. This was followed by SAS on 26 October, when they opened a DC-6 route to Bangkok with seven intermediate stops. At first there were two round trips per month, but from 1950 this was increased to two per week.

=== European Scandinavian Airlines System ===
The SAS cooperation initially only considered intercontinental traffic, and the three national airlines continued to compete on inter-Scandinavian and European traffic. All three were represented with sales offices in each of the other countries, and all three maintained sales offices in all foreign cities they served. Informal discussions to pool international routes started in 1947, after all three companies had suffered losses on these routes. After SILA and Aerotransport merged, negotiations started between the three. The brand name "Scandinavian Airlines System" was to be used on all flights, domestic and international, and the airlines would coordinate their services to avoid parallel flights. Domestic scheduling would remain at the discretion of each national airline. DNL would then close its Swedish and Danish offices, and retain Scandinavian offices in other European cities. The pool agreement, which became known as European Scandinavian Airlines System (EASA), was taken into use on 18 April 1948.

Per M. Backe became CEO of OSAS, and was replaced by Hjalmar Riiser-Larsen. ESAS had two opposing goals: to operate the partner's aircraft along the 3–2–2 ratio, and operate them most rationally. Because of the un-unified fleet composition, these were often not possible to combine. DNL lost NOK 17 million in 1948, in part because it had the least efficient aircraft and received no compensation for its higher operating costs. To remain liquid, DNL received NOK 35 in capital from the state through loans.

While ESAS proved profitable for Aerotransport and DDL, it became a burden for DNL. The former two had a much closer overlap between their routes, while DNL had operated without direct competition with the other two on most of its routes. Instead of coordinating resources, ESAS had become another administrative level; there were also concerns from Norway that administrative and operative staff were leaking to the ESAS head office in Copenhagen and the OSAS head office in Stockholm, without any similar build-up of competence in Norway. Because of the way the costs were divided between the pool partners, DNL was also receiving smaller margins that the others.

== Fleet ==
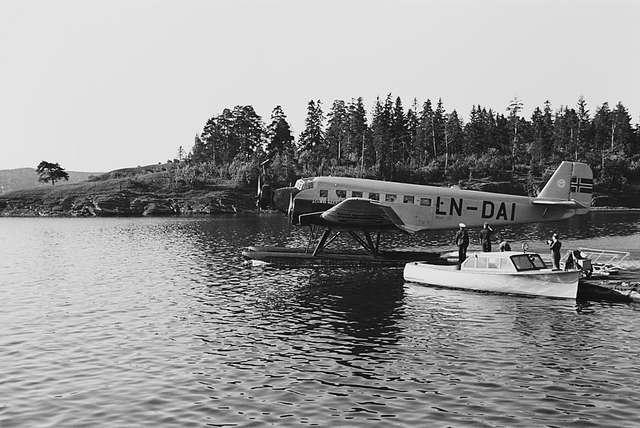
A Junkers Ju 52 docked at Oslo Airport, Fornebu in 1939

Manufacturer	Model	Quantity	Introduced	Retired
Junkers	Ju 52	6	1935	1951
Sikorsky	S-43	1	1936	1938
Douglas	DC-2	6	1939	1940
Douglas	DC-3	6	1946	1951
Short Brothers	Sandringham Mark VI	3	1946	1951

== Accidents and incidents ==
- On 17 June 1936, the Havørn Accident became the first fatal air crash of a civil airliner in Norway. The Junkers Ju 52 Havørn, en route from Bergen to Tromsø, crashed into a mountain wall, hidden behind a cloud, at Lihesten in Sogn, killing all seven on board, including the crew of three.
- On 26 May 1946, a DNL Junkers Ju 52 from Oslo en route to Stockholm crashed into the houses at Halden Terrasse near Oslo Airport, Fornebu after take-off, due to a technical error on the aircraft. Thirteen of fourteen people on board were killed.
- On 28 August 1947, the Kvitbjørn Accident with a Sandringham killed 36 people, after the aircraft crashed into the mountain Klubben.
- On 2 October 1948, the Bukkene Bruse Accident with a Sandringham killed 19 people while landing at Trondheim Airport, Hommelvik.
- On 15 May 1950, Bamse Brakar sank after takeoff from Harstad. No-one was killed, but the Short Sandringham sank after one hour.
