= Swedish Intercontinental Airlines =

Swedish airline, 1943–1948

Svensk Interkontinental Lufttrafik AB, SILA, trading internationally as Swedish Intercontinental Airlines, was an airline formed in 1943 by banker Marcus Wallenberg Jr. An early president of the airline was Per Norlin. In August 1946 with Danish Air Lines and Norwegian Air Lines it became a part of a three-airline consortium (later four, with AB Aerotransport) that would eventually merge on 30 June 1948 with a pooled capitalization of $25 million as Scandinavian Airlines. The airline operated Douglas DC-4 and Boeing B-17 Flying Fortress aircraft.

In 1946, the company was asked by a group of Jewish Americans if it could transport about two thousand wealthy Jewish Poles out of Poland, to then fly to the United States to resettle there. Given a scarcity of aircraft (SILA operated only a twice-weekly schedule between Stockholm and Warsaw), the airline was not able to take action on the request. The airline was also a part of the 1946 introduction of United States airmail service to Copenhagen and Stockholm.
