= Sikorsky S-43 =

American flying boat

S-43 / JRS-1
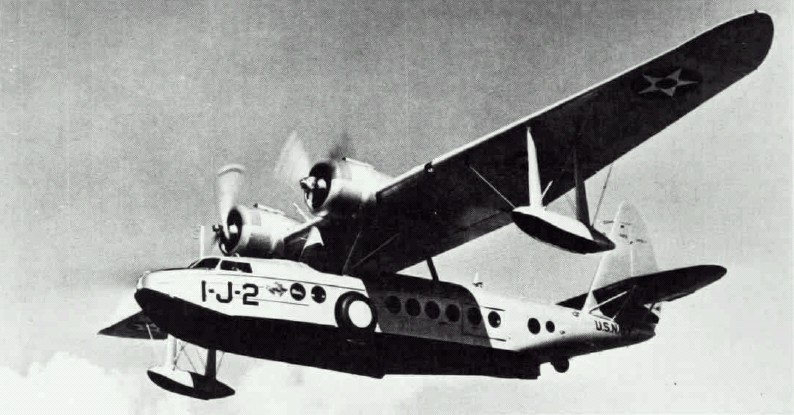

General information
- Type: Flying boat airliner
- National origin: United States
- Manufacturer: Sikorsky Aircraft
- Designer: Igor Sikorsky
- Status: Retired
- Primary users: Pan American Airways Hawaiian Airlines
- Number built: 53

History
- Introduction date: 1934
- First flight: 1935

The Sikorsky S-43 (sometimes referred to as the Baby Clipper) is a 1930s American twin-engine amphibious flying boat monoplane produced by Sikorsky Aircraft.

== Design and development ==
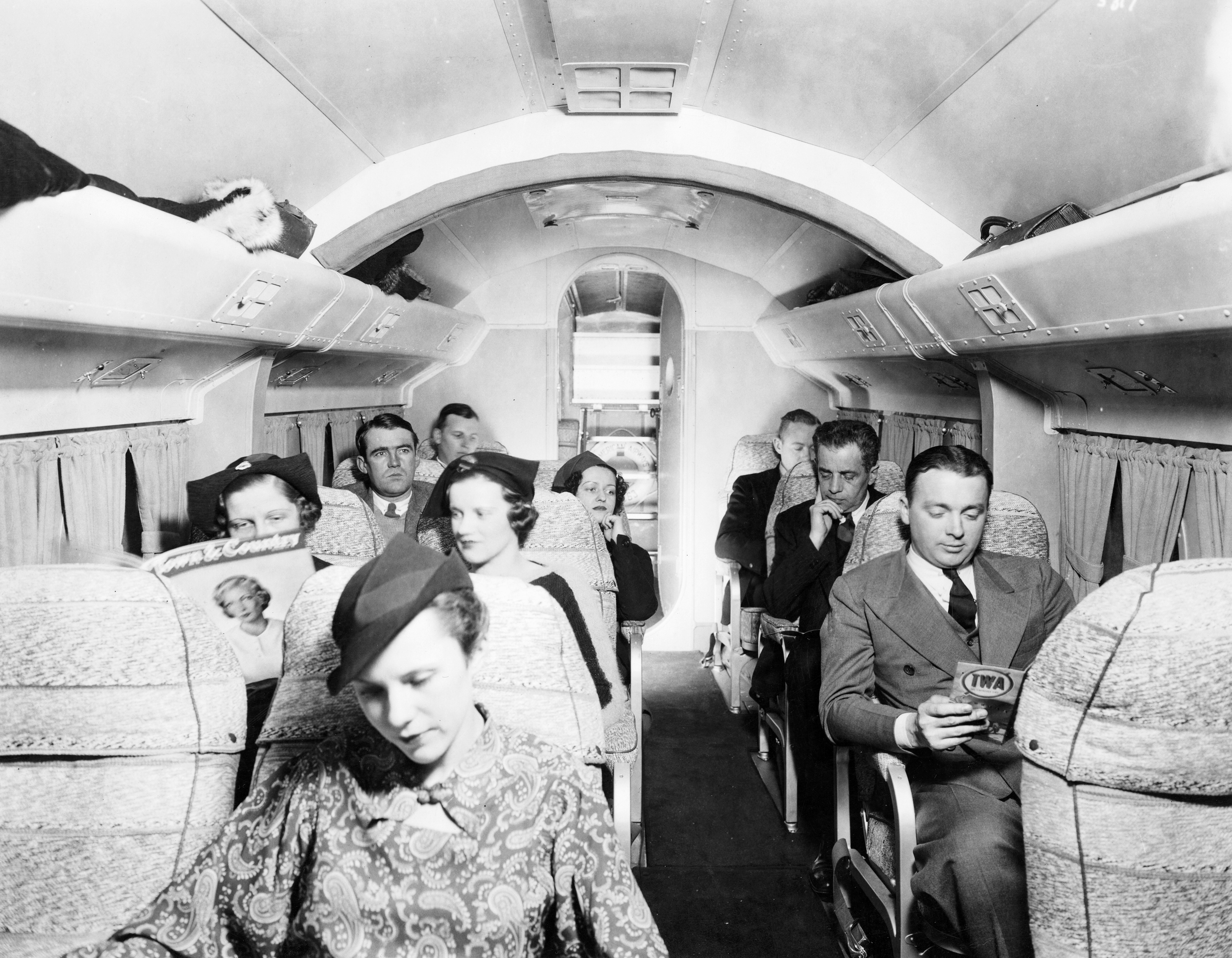
S-43 cabin

The S-43 first flew in 1935, and was a smaller version of the Sikorsky S-42 "Clipper". It accommodated between 18 and 25 passengers, with a separate forward cockpit for the two crew. The S-43 was known as the "Baby Clipper" in airline service.

On April 14, 1936, an S-43 with a 500 kg (1,100 lb) payload, piloted by Boris Sergievsky, set an altitude record for amphibious aircraft when it reached an altitude of 27,950 ft (8,520 m) over Stamford, Connecticut, with designer Igor Sikorsky aboard.

Approximately 53 S-43s were built, including examples of the twin-tailed S-43B.

== Operational history ==
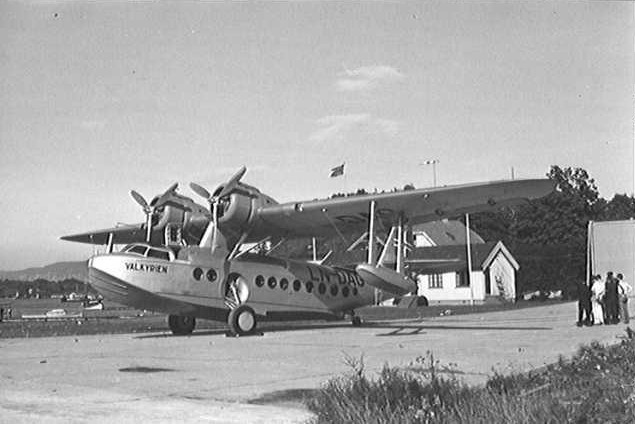
Norwegian S-43 LN-DAG Valkyrien at Gressholmen Airport in 1936.

The S-43 was used primarily by Pan American World Airways for flights to Cuba and within Latin America. Inter-Island Airways of Hawaii (Inter-Island changed its name to Hawaiian Airlines in 1941) was the launch customer for the S-43. Inter-Island operated four S-43's to ferry Pan Am Clipper passengers and local residents from Honolulu throughout the Hawaiian Islands. Inter-Island sold its only twin-tail version to KLM. One aircraft was purchased by Norwegian airline Det Norske Luftfartselskap. Panair do Brasil operated seven aircraft. Five S-43s were used between 1937 and 1945 by the French company Aéromaritime on a colonial airway between Dakar (Senegal) and Pointe-Noire (Congo). Reeve Aleutian Airways owned two S-43s during the 1950s, one operational (N53294 purchased 1948 and trade for G-21 in 1957) and one for spares (fuselage at Alaska Aviation Heritage Museum). Another S-43 was operated in Alaska with an unknown operator, wrecked at Chignik, AK, 1950s.

The U.S. Army Air Corps acquired five aircraft in 1937 under the designation OA-8 for transport of freight and passengers. The U.S. Navy purchased 17 aircraft between 1937 and 1939 as the JRS-1, two of which served with the U.S. Marine Corps. One JRS survived by the end of 1941.

The Chilean Air Force (FACH) (formerly known as Fuerza Aérea Nacional (FAN)) in 1936 bought 2 S-43: No. 1 named "Magallanes" and the No.2 named "Chiloé", because that aircraft was going to use in the Línea Aérea Experimental Puerto Montt-Magallanes (Experimental Air Line from Puerto Montt to Magallanes) flying through the Patagonian fjords.

Two aircraft went to private owners: William Kissam Vanderbilt II and Howard Hughes.

== Accidents and incidents ==
June 2, 1937
The Chilean Air Force S-43 (No. 2) capsized off Ancud, Chile, killing all nine on board.
August 2, 1937
A Pan American-Grace Airways (Panagra) S-43B (NC15065) crashed in the vicinity of Coco Solo in the Panama Canal Zone; all 14 on board died. The plane spiraled into the water at approximately 90 mph and was destroyed by an immediate explosion and fire. The most likely cause of the crash was a faulty gasoline system and/or sudden and severe rain. The pilot indicated he lost altitude twice in the three minutes before the crash.
August 8, 1937
A China National Aviation Corporation (CNAC) S-43W (named Chekiang) ditched at Chilang Point, Bias Bay, China, killing three of four crew; all seven passengers survived. The flying boat was forced to ditch due to bad weather. High waves broke one wing off; the eight survivors clung to the other wing until rescued.
April 25, 1938
Pan Am Flight 105, an S-43B (NC16932) stalled and crashed on landing off Kingston due to engine failure; all 18 passengers and crew survived, but the aircraft was written off.
August 13, 1939
A Pan Am S-43 (NC16933) crashed into Guanabara Bay off Rio de Janeiro due to loss of control following engine failure, killing 14 of 16 on board.
May 17, 1943
Hughes crashed his S-43 into Lake Mead, killing CAA inspector Ceco Cline and Hughes employee Richard Felt. The aircraft was later raised and restored to flying condition.
August 3, 1945
Pan Am Flight 216, an S-43 (NC15066), crashed on landing at Fort de France Hydrobase due to weather and pilot error, killing four of 14 on board.
January 3, 1947
A Panair do Brasil S-43B (PP-PBN) crashed in the Amazon River at São Paulo de Olivenca, killing 11 of 14 on board.

== Surviving aircraft ==
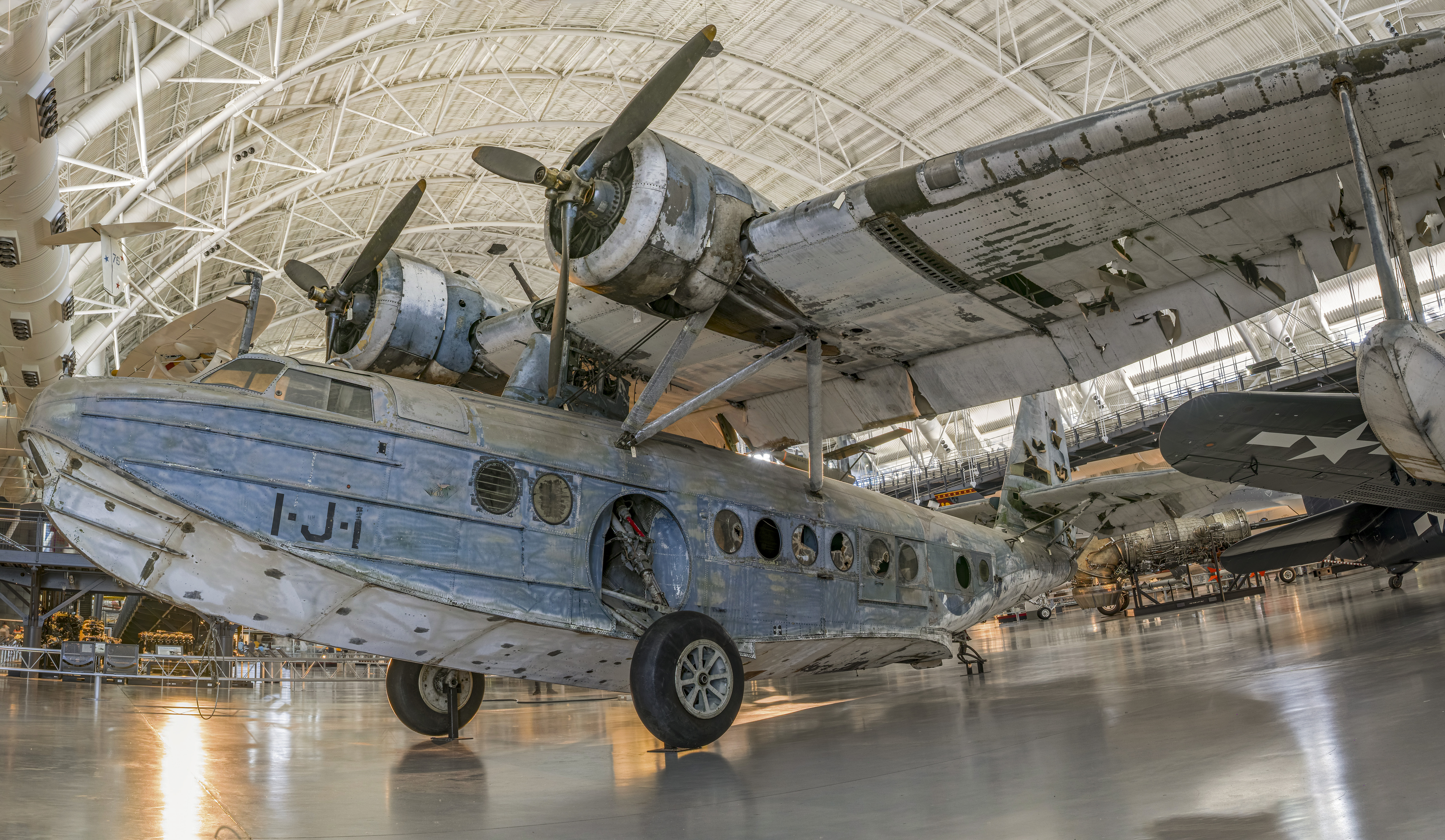
Preserved Sikorsky JRS-1 that survived the Japanese attack on Pearl Harbor at the Steven F. Udvar-Hazy Center

Hughes' S-43 N440 was the last example to fly. It is now owned by Kermit Weeks, and was at the Fantasy of Flight Museum restoration facility, in Polk City, Florida, awaiting reassembly and restoration to flight.

A Sikorsky JRS-1 is displayed at the Smithsonian National Air & Space Museum's Steven F. Udvar-Hazy Center in Virginia, in an unrestored state. This aircraft was on duty at Pearl Harbor on December 7, 1941. It was acquired by the Smithsonian in 1960 and spent 51 years in storage before being placed on display in 2011. As of late 2026 the Smithsonian has begun a multi-year restoration process on the aircraft which is tentatively expected to go back on display around 2028.

Sikorsky S-43 (Baby Clipper) at the Pima Air and Space Museum

A Pan Am S-43 (NC16934) is displayed at the Pima Air & Space Museum. It has been painted in the U. S. Marine Corps markings of VMJ-2 out of deference to its owner, The National Museum of the Marine Corps in Quantico, VA

== Specifications (Sikorsky S-43) ==
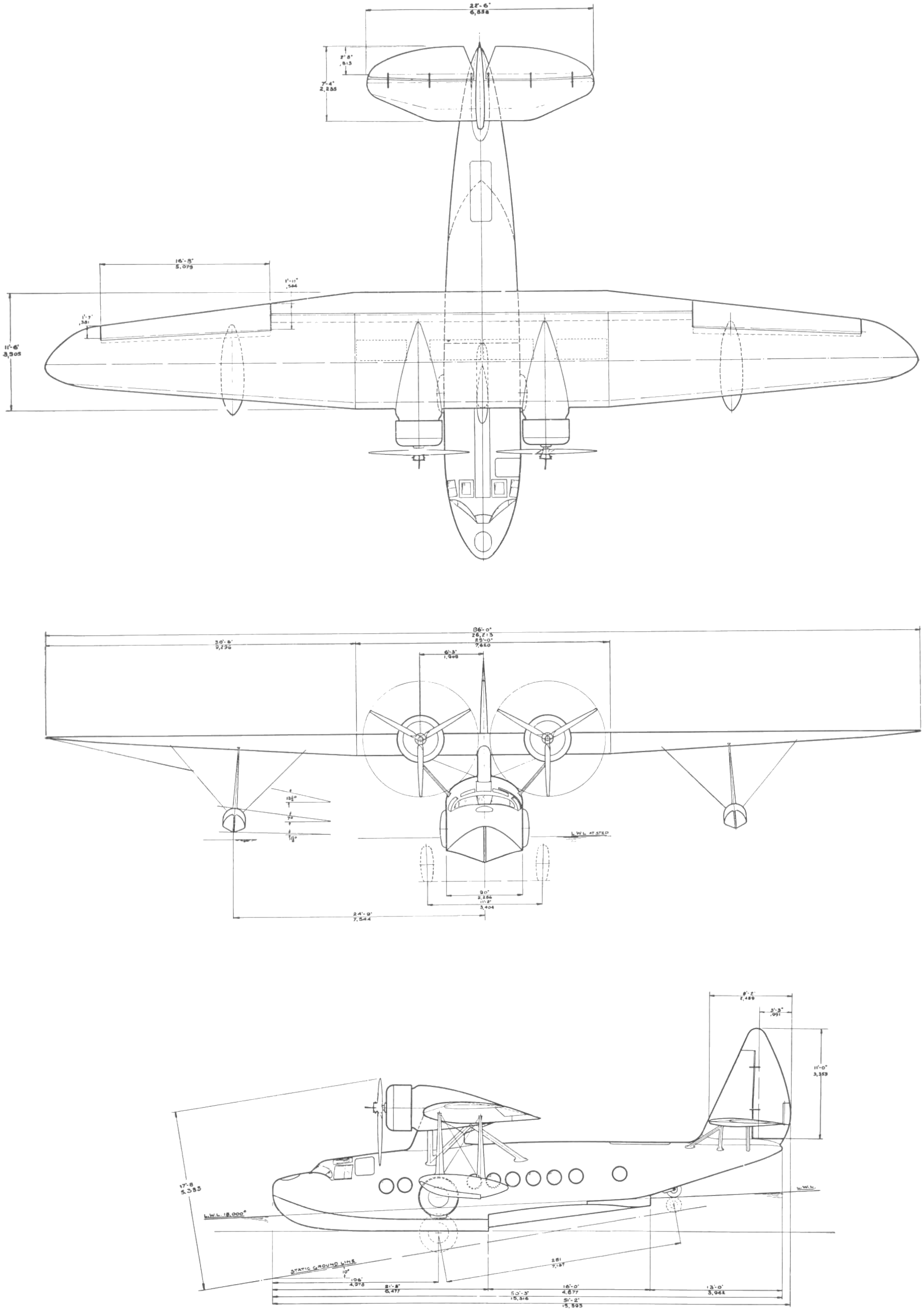
3-view line drawing of the Sikorsky S-43

Data from , American flying boats and amphibious aircraft : an illustrated history

General characteristics

- Crew: Two to Four
- Capacity: 11 passengers
- Length: 51 ft 2 in (15.60 m)
- Wingspan: 86 ft 0 in (26.21 m)
- Height: 17 ft 8 in (5.38 m)
- Wing area: 780.6 sq ft (72.52 m^{2})
- Airfoil: root: NACA 2218; tip: NACA 2212
- Empty weight: 12,750 lb (5,783 kg)
- Gross weight: 19,500 lb (8,845 kg)
- Fuel capacity: 100 US gal (83 imp gal; 380 L) in four wing tanks
- Powerplant: 2 × Pratt & Whitney R-1690-52 Hornet 9-cylinder air-cooled radial piston engines, 750 hp (560 kW) each at 7,000 ft (2,100 m)
- Propellers: 3-bladed Hamilton Standard variable-pitch propellers

Performance

- Maximum speed: 178 mph (286 km/h, 155 kn) at sea level

190 mph (170 kn; 310 km/h) at 7,000 ft (2,100 m)

- Cruise speed: 166 mph (267 km/h, 144 kn) at 7,000 ft (2,100 m)
- Landing speed: 64 mph (56 kn; 103 km/h)
- Range: 775 mi (1,247 km, 673 nmi) at 7,000 ft (2,100 m) at 70% power
- Service ceiling: 19,000 ft (5,800 m)
- Rate of climb: 1,000 ft/min (5.1 m/s)
- Wing loading: 25 lb/sq ft (120 kg/m^{2})
- Power/mass: 13 lb/hp (7.9 kg/kW)

== See also ==
Related development

- Sikorsky S-42

Related lists

- List of flying boats and floatplanes
- List of aircraft of World War II
