= Danish Air Lines =

Flag carrier airline of Denmark (1918–1920)

Danish Air Lines Det Danske Luftfartselskab
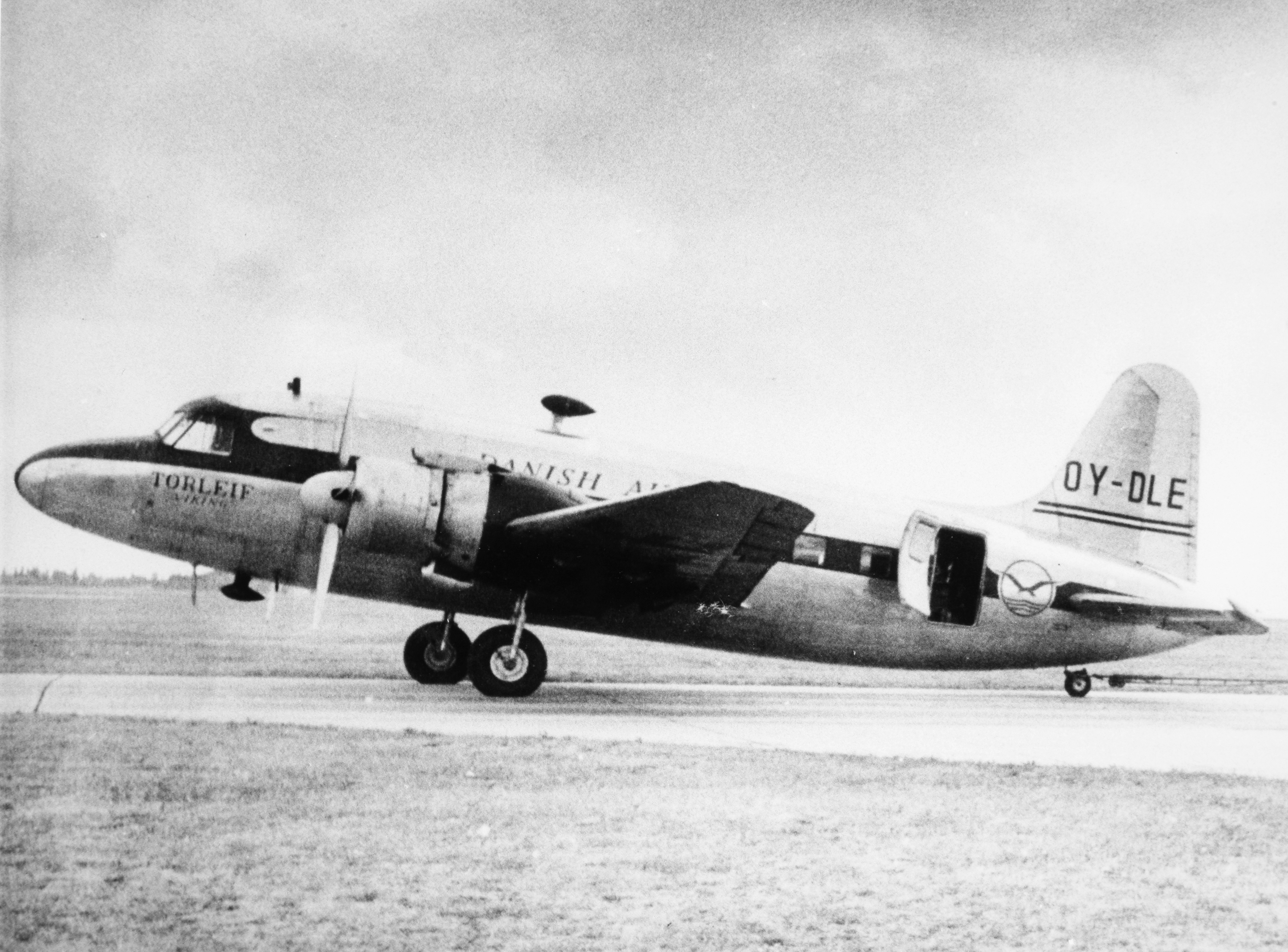
- Vickers Viking 1B
| IATA | ICAO | Call sign |
|---|---|---|
| DD | DDL | — |
- Founded: October 29, 1918
- Commenced operations: August 7, 1920
- Ceased operations: 1951 (merged with DNL and SILA to form SAS)

DDL-Det Danske Luftfartselskab A/S, Danish Air Lines in English language, was Denmark's national airline from 1918 until it merged to create Scandinavian Airlines System (SAS) in 1950. DDL was established on 29 October 1918 and started irregular operations on 31 October 1919. The company was legally registered on 19 March 1920 and started its first scheduled route on the following 7 August.

== History ==
In 1920, the first airplane, a Flugzeugbau Friedrichshafen 49c, was acquired from the Deutsche Luft-Reederei (D.L.R.) in Germany. The airplane, with the previous German navy registration 1364, was almost new, and had been refitted for passenger transport before being delivered from Germany. It received the Danish registration letters T-DABA, and was used for the Copenhagen-Malmö-Warnemünde route in cooperation with the D.L.R. This plane was later returned to Germany, apparently because the transfer was not in accordance with the Versailles treaty.

In 1921 another F.F.49c plane from D.L.R. was acquired as a replacement for the first, with the previous German navy registration 3078. For unknown reasons this airplane used the same Danish registration T-DABA.

In the early 1920s, the airline relied on four chartered Fokker-Grulich F.III aircraft, but also Dornier Komet, Junkers F.13s and the Airco DH.9.

In 1926 the first of a total of four Farman F.121 Jabiru 4-engined commercial airliners, seating nine passengers, were acquired. It was registered as T-DOXB, and was used on the Copenhagen to Amsterdam line. Amsterdam was a hub with connections to London and Paris. The aircraft were withdrawn from use in 1928 and 1929, and broken up by 1931.

In the late 1920s, Fokker F.VII single-engined airliners replaced the somewhat problematic and expensive to operate Farmans.

In 1933, the airline got the first of two 16 passenger Fokker F.XII airliners. They were built under license by Orlogsværftet. Both aircraft were scrapped by 1946.

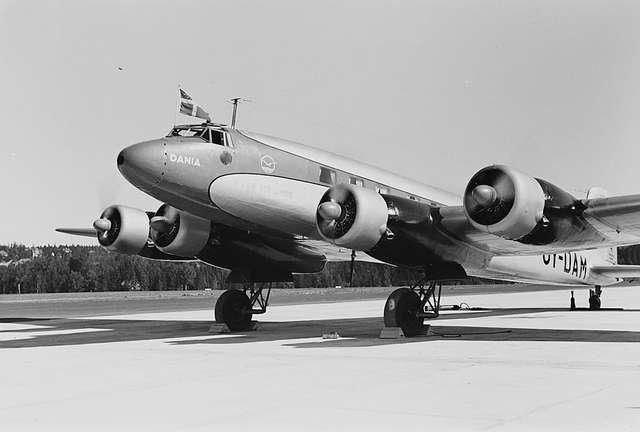
Focke-Wulf Fw 200 Dania at Fornebu Airport in Norway in 1939

In 1938, two Focke-Wulf Fw 200 Condor 26 passenger airliners were acquired. One, Dania, was seized by the British after Denmark was invaded by German forces in 1940, and damaged beyond repair in 1941. Because of the military situation all operations were halted in April 1940. The other, Jutlandia, survived the war and continued in DDL service until damaged beyond repair at Northolt in 1946. In September 1946, the airline started intercontinental traffic in cooperation with Det Norske Luftfartselskap and Svensk Interkontinental Lufttrafik as O.S.A.S.-Overseas Scandinavian Airline System. Inter-European services were brought under E.S.A.S.-European Scandinavian Airline System on 18 April 1948. On October 1, 1950 representatives from the three airlines signed a consortium agreement where they appointed SAS to run all the airline operations. DDL thus changed status from an active airline to a holding company to control Danish interests in SAS.

== Accidents and incidents ==
- On 2 May 1933, Fokker F.VIIa OY-DAC crashed in fog while approaching Hannover, killing the pilot; the aircraft was operating a cargo (mail) flight.
- On 17 December 1945, Fokker F.XII OY-DIG Merkur was written off after crashing at Kastrup Airport.
- On 30 January 1946, Boeing B-17G OY-DFE Trym Viking ran off the runway and struck RAF Dakota KG427 while landing at Kastrup Airport; there were no casualties, but both aircraft were written off.
- On 4 September 1946, Focke-Wulf Fw 200A-05 Condor OY-DEM Jutlandia was written off following a crosswind landing at Northolt Airport.
- On 17 February 1947, Douglas C-47A OY-AEB Rane Viking force-landed on the ice off Malmö due to fuel exhaustion. While approaching Copenhagen the crew encountered fog and poor visibility and diverted to Malmö, but the weather there was also poor. The crew decided to return to Copenhagen but the aircraft ran out of fuel and force-landed on the ice and burned out.
- On 29 December 1947, Vickers Viking 1B OY-DLI Torulf Viking lost control, stalled and crashed in shallow water while on approach to Kastrup Airport; all 24 on board survived, but the aircraft was written off.
- On 12 February 1948, Douglas C-53 OY-DCI Sejr Viking crashed in a field at Ulrichstein, Germany while on approach to Frankfurt following engine failure, killing 12 of 21 on board.
- On 8 February 1949, Vickers Viking 1B OY-DLU Torlak Viking crashed in the sea off Barsebäck, Sweden, killing all 27 on board; the wreckage was found a month later in 23 m (75 ft) of water. The accident remains the second deadliest in Sweden, behind Linjeflyg Flight 277.
