= Gressholmen Airport =

Former airport of Oslo, Norway (1927–1946)

Gressholmen Airport Gressholmen sjøflyhavn
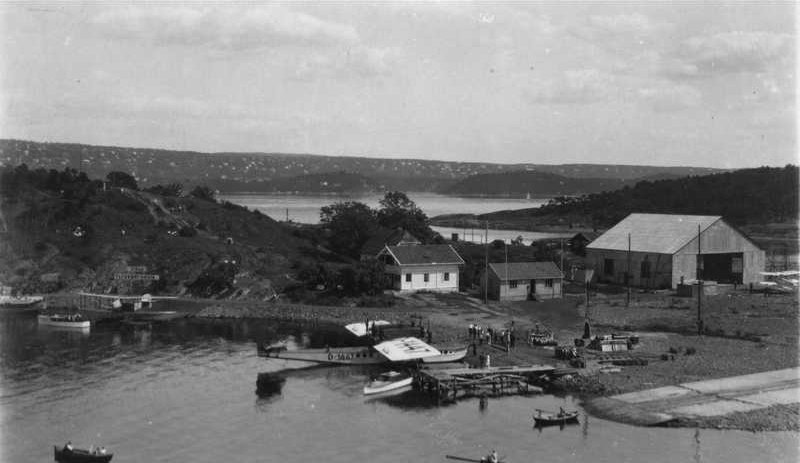
- IATA: none; ICAO: none

Summary
- Airport type: Public water aerodrome
- Owner: Oslo Municipality
- Operator: Norske Luftruter (1927–1934); Fred. Olsen & Co. (1934–1939)
- Serves: Oslo, Norway
- Location: Gressholmen, Oslo
- Opened: 18 July 1927
- Closed: 1946
- Passenger services ceased: 1 June 1939
- Elevation AMSL: 0 m / 0 ft
- Coordinates: 59°53′02″N 010°43′00″E

Map
- Location in Norway
- No longer in operation

Gressholmen Airport was a water aerodrome situated on the island of Gressholmen in Oslo, Norway. It served as the main airport for Oslo from 1927 to 1939, along with Kjeller Airport. The aerodrome consisted of docks, a landing ramp, terminal building and a hangar and used a section of the Oslofjord as its runway. Being located on an island it was necessary to transport passengers by boat to the island. The airport only operated during the summer, typically from May through September.

Oslo's first airport was located on the neighboring island of Lindøya, but the authorities preferred Gressholmen as a location. Although plans surfaced in 1919, funding was not ensured until 1926. Norsk Luftruter received a concession to operate the airport, ground handling and the ferry service. Deutsche Luft Hansa commenced the first service on 18 July 1927, flying from Oslo via Gothenburg and Copenhagen to Szczecin. The following year the terminus was moved to Travemünde outside Lübeck. The airport was also used by Halle & Peterson's Norway Post flights during the early 1930s and by Widerøe in 1934.

Norwegian Air Lines (DNL) started domestic flights and an international service to Amsterdam in 1935. Deutsche Luft Hansa moved its flights to Kjeller from 1938 and from 1 June the following year all civilian traffic was transferred to Fornebu Airport. Gressholmen saw a limited amount of use by the Royal Norwegian Navy Air Service, the Luftwaffe and the Royal Norwegian Air Force until it was closed in 1946. Most of the facilities, including the hangar, remain today and are used for a marina.

== History ==
=== Establishment ===
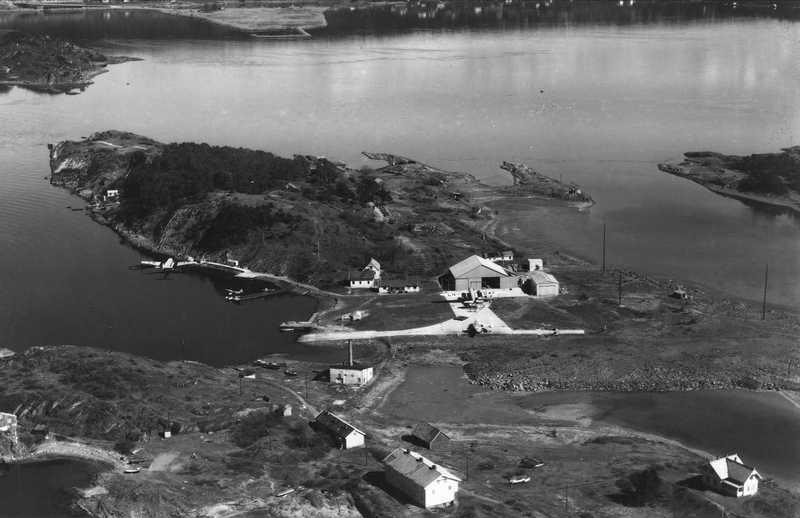
Aerial view of the airport in 1937

Plans for an airport serving Oslo were first presented by Det Norske Luftfartrederi in 1919. The airline proposed that Lindøya, an island located immediately north of Gressholmen, would be a suitable site. The issue was debated in Parliament, as the airline proposed leasing 2 hectares (4.9 acres) of the island from the state for 99 years. Oslo Port Authority opposed, stating that the use of Lindøya would interfere with the ship traffic in the port. Instead, they proposed that Gressholmen would be a more suitable location. A committee was appointed by the Ministry of Defense—which was at the time responsible for aviation policy—to look into the construction of airport. It concluded that airports should be state-owned, and that the state should grant sufficient funding to establish an airport in Oslo. This would allow for the establishment of a service to Copenhagen, and possibly at a later date domestic flights to Trondheim, Bodø and Harstad. The issue was dismissed by Parliament.

The issue was considered by Parliament again in 1923. By then Oslo Municipality had issued a grant of 130,000 Norwegian krone (NOK) under the explicit condition that the state finance the rest of the airport. The total cost of construction was estimated at NOK 275,000. Parliament debated issuing NOK 50,000, but the proposal failed to gather a majority. An air route had by then been established from Hamburg via Malmö to Gothenburg and the airline offered to extend it to Oslo if a suitable airport was built. The issue resurfaced in Parliament in both 1926 and 1927. The main argument from those opposing the airport was that they did not believe that commercial aviation had any potential. NOK 10,000 was granted in 1926, but further funding was not made available.

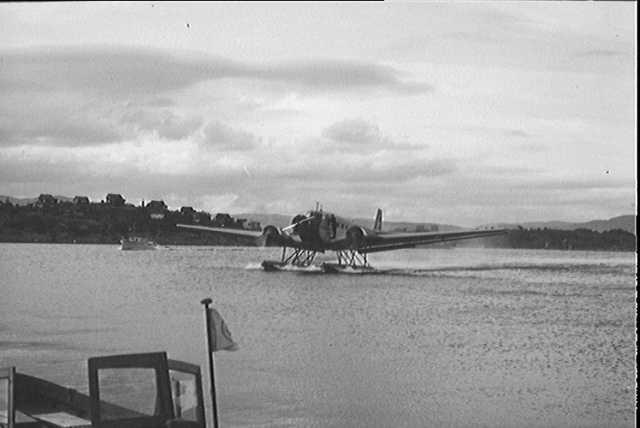
Norwegian Air Lines' Junkers Ju 52 landing at the airport

Construction commenced in 1926 and was completed the following year. This included the construction of a hangar and a slip. Wilhelm Meisterlin established the company Norske Luftruter. It did not have its own aircraft, but instead cooperated with Deutsche Luft Hansa. Norske Luftruter bought a boat, MB Ørn I, and was responsible for ground handling for Deutsche Luft Hansa, ground transport and the operation of the airport. Within a month Norwegian Air Lines was established and it also applied to operate the airport and affiliated service, but this was rejected by the state. Instead, DNL was granted a concession to operate a ferry service from Oslo East Station to Gressholmen.

=== Operation ===
Deutsche Luft Hansa originally used Dornier Do J Wal aircraft. German mechanical crew arrived on 11 July and the first landing took place on 16 July, surrounded by festivities. The first revenue landing took place at 18:30 on 18 July. The route flown was from Szczecin via Copenhagen and Gothenburg to Oslo. In addition to passengers, the service had carried post. Flights lasted until 30 September when the season ended. Deutsche Luft Hansa had then flown 636 passengers and 9,591 kilograms (21,145 lb) of post.

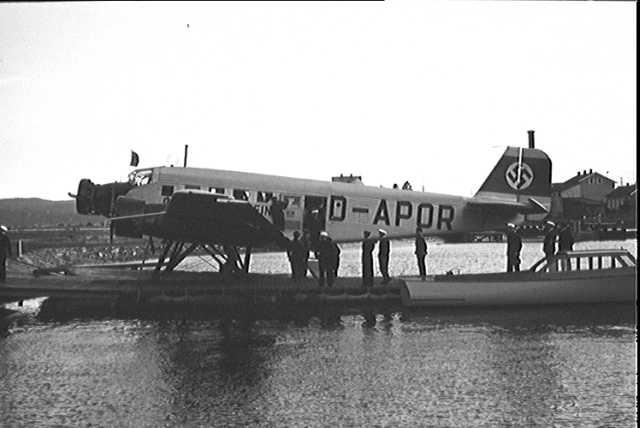
Deutsche Luft Hansa Junkers Ju 52

The 1928 season commenced on 21 May, seeing the route reduced to three weekly services and the southern terminus of the route moved to Travemünde outside Lübeck. This allowed for the introduction of the larger ten-passenger Rohrbach Ro V Rocco aircraft. It made only seven flights, the last on 16 June, before it was taken out of service as the airline deemed it unsuitable. From 20 June the service was flown using a Dornier Do R Superwal, the first service used by the new class of aircraft. The 1939 season lasted from 21 May to 31 August, and was served using Dornier Wals and Superwals. From 1930 a daily service was again introduced. The number of connections from Lübeck increased, featuring Berlin, Prague, Vienna and Paris. By then the annual ridership had increased to 935. Patronage fell in 1931 to 774 and to 582 the following year. Deutsche Luft Hansa widened its season in 1933 to encompass services from 1 May to 30 September, allowing ridership to increase to 1,230. From 1934 the airline introduced Junkers Ju 52 aircraft and recorded 2,387 passengers.

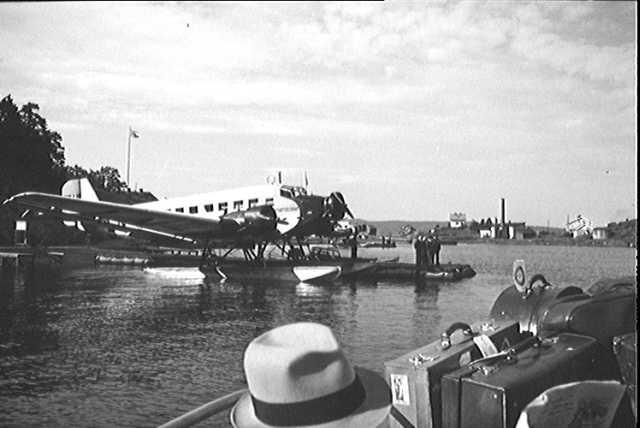
Norwegian Air Lines' Junkers Ju 52 docked at Gressholmen

Norsk Luftruter bought a LFG V 13 in 1928, which they converted to floats and based at Gressholmen. The following June a second similar aircraft was delivered and the company started flying a service from Gressholmen via Lillehammer to Bygdin. Otherwise they were used for various charter and joy rides. The airline sold both aircraft in 1932. The Lindøya-based Holm & Bøe started ferry services to Gressholmen in the early 1930s on contract with the airlines. From the early 1930s Norway Post started leasing designated postal night flights, which were flown by Halle & Peterson. However, by were stopped in 1932 due to lack of funding. From its establishment in 1934, Widerøe conducted their flights out of Oslo to towns along the coast. However, they soon moved their Oslo operations to Ingierstand on the mainland.

A 1930 government-appointed civil aviation commission concluded in 1932 that a single, large national airline be established. To fill this role, the Fred. Olsen & Co.-backed Norwegian Air Lines was established. Norsk Luftruter ceased operations in 1934. Fred. Olsen subsequently took over the ferry service, operation of the airport and ground handling.

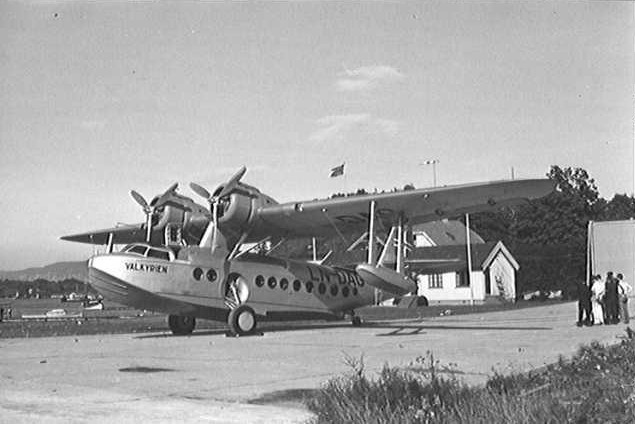
Norwegian Air Lines' Sikorsky S-43 LN-DAG at Gressholmen

DNL was granted a ten-year monopoly on all domestic flights on 5 April 1935. This initially consisted of a sea plane route from Oslo along the coast to Tromsø and an international route from Oslo via Kristiansand to Amsterdam. DNL received NOK 200,000 in state grants, plus NOK 100,000 from Norway Post, for the first year of operation. Services commenced on 7 June with a wet leased Ju 52 from Luft Hansa on the international route. The domestic routes were flown using Junkers W 34. It bought a new ferry, MB Teist. DNL's travel time from Oslo to Bergen was four and a half hours, with intermediate stops in Moss, Arendal, Kristiansand, Stavanger and Haugesund.

DNL struck a deal with Pan American World Airways in 1936 to start transatlantic flights and bought an American amphibious Sikorsky S-43 Valkyrien. The deal with Pan Am fell through, but Valkyrien became a regular aircraft at Gressholmen. The same year DNL subcontracted the operations of the ferries to Holm & Bøe, when they took delivery of their new ferry, MS Oslo IX. It served until the closing of the aerodrome. Deutsche Luft Hansa ceased operations at Gressholmen after the 1937 season. It introduced wheeled Ju 52s and moved its flights to Kjeller Airport.

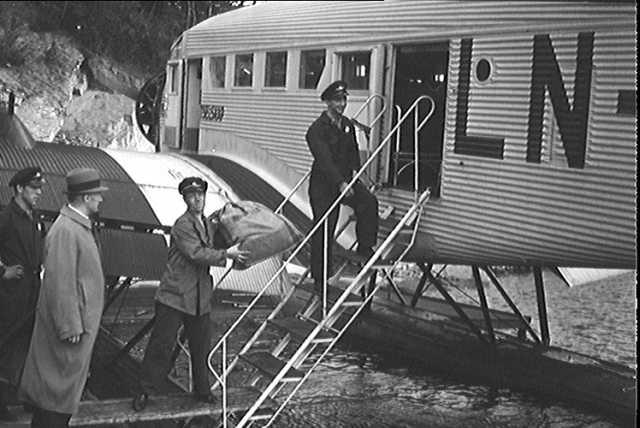
Passenger boarding a Norwegian Air Lines Junkers Ju 52

=== Closing ===
Throughout the late 1920s and 1930s, Oslo had a split airport model. Land planes operated out of Kjeller, while seaplanes operated out of Gressholmen. This was by many regarded as a suboptimal solution, largely because both airports had poor ground transport. The Norwegian Aero Club proposed several new locations in 1930, including Ulven and Ekeberg. Also the 1932 committee appointed by the Ministry of Defense was critical to Gressholmen, in part because the ferrying of passengers would become impractical with increased traffic, and in part because it interfered with the ship traffic in the port. It estimated that land planes would be dominant in the future, and looked into eight possible locations. It concluded that Fornebu, located in the neighbouring municipality of Bærum was the most suitable. It also felt that Ulven and Ekeberg could be suitable sites.

The government appointed several airport committees through the 1930s, and they all concluded with Fornebu as the most suitable location. The proposal was approved by the government in 1934. Oslo Municipality bought the land in September and construction started within days. Fornebu opened on 1 June 1939, causing the closure of Gressholmen as a civilian airport. However, the Royal Norwegian Navy Air Service took it into use.

At the break-out of Operation Weserübung—the start of the German occupation of Norway on 9 April 1940—the Luftwaffe bombed Gressholmen at 08:30. At the time there were two Junkers Ju 52s at the airport, one was for the Royal Norwegian Navy Air Service and the other was intended for civilian use. Throughout the Second World War there was some German activity at the airport. After the end of the war Gressholmen was taken over by the Royal Norwegian Air Force. However, they only remained at the aerodrome until 1946. They retained ownership of the facility until 1953 when it was sold to ferry operator Båtservice, who refurbished the hangar and docks and used it for winter storage of their ferries.

== Facilities ==
The airport was located on Gressholmen, an island situated in the Oslofjord, close to downtown Oslo, only accessible by boat. It consisted of a hangar, a terminal building, a loading ramp and docks. The hangar and terminal buildings remain in use today for storage of pleasure boats and the docks are used as a marina.

== Bibliography ==
- Guhnfeldt, Cato (1990). Fornebu 9. april (in Norwegian). Oslo: Wings. ISBN 82-992194-1-8.
- Lorentzen, Harald (1990). I Oslofergenes øyrike (in Norwegian). Skien: Genius Forlag. ISBN 82-991292-6-5.
- Nerdrum, Johan (1986). Fugl fønix: En beretning om Det Norske Luftfartselskap (in Norwegian). Oslo: Gyldendal Norsk Forlag. ISBN 82-05-16663-3.
- Storberget, Bjørn (1995). Posten får vinger (in Norwegian). Dato Forlag.
- Waage, Gry (1998). Fra Kongelung til Padda (in Norwegian). Oslo: Schibsted. ISBN 82-516-1700-6.
- Wisting, Tor (1989). Oslo lufthavn Fornebu 1939–1989 (in Norwegian). TWK-forlaget. ISBN 82-90884-00-1.
