= KLM (disambiguation) =

KLM is the flag carrier of the Netherlands.

KLM may also refer to:

- klm or kilolumen, the thousandfold unit multiple of the lumen
- Kerr-lens modelocking, a method of modelocking lasers
- KLM Open, former name of the Dutch Open golf tournament
- Koninklijk Legermuseum, another name of the Royal Museum of the Armed Forces and Military History, Brussels, Belgium
- 4 KLM, a village in Sri Ganganagar district, Rajasthan, India
- Karachi–Lahore Motorway, Pakistan

== Computer science ==
- Keystroke-level model, a form of human–computer interaction
- Loadable kernel module, a feature various computer operating systems
- KLM protocol, a way of constructing quantum computers

== Identifier codes ==
- Kolom language, a language of Papua New Guinea, ISO 639 code
- Kalaleh Airport, Kalaleh, Iran, IATA code
- Kilmaurs railway station, East Ayrshire, Scotland, station code
- Kollam KSRTC Bus Station, Kerala, India, depot code

== People ==
- KLM comedy trio, Norwegian comedians Trond Kirkvaag, Knut Lystad, and Lars Mjøen
- KLM Line, lineup of the Russian ice hockey players Vladimir Krutov, Igor Larionov, and Sergei Makarov
- Kurt Laurenz Metzler, sculptor

== See also ==
- Kalem Company, an early American film studio
- KM Malta Airlines, the flag carrier of Malta
