= Kirkvaag =

Kirkvaag is a surname. Notable people with the surname include:

- Rolf Kirkvaag (1920–2003), Norwegian journalist and broadcaster
- Trond Kirkvaag (1946–2007), Norwegian comedian, actor, impressionist, screenwriter, author, director and television host
