= Brødrene Dal =

Norwegian television series

- The brothers, from left: Roms, Gaus and Brumund Dal
- Created by: Lars Mjøen; Knut Lystad; Trond Kirkvaag; Eivind Aaeng; Kalle Fürst
- Starring: Lars Mjøen; Knut Lystad; Trond Kirkvaag and Tom Mathisen
- Country of origin: Norway
- No. of seasons: 4
- No. of episodes: 48 + 1 movie

Production
- Running time: 15–25 minutes (1979–1994); 30 minutes (2005)

Original release
- Network: NRK
- Release: 27 January 1979 – 16 March 2005

Brødrene Dal (lit. 'The Brothers Dal') is a Norwegian television series by Norwegian comedy trio KLM (Kirkvaag, Lystad, Mjøen), that originally aired as four series in 1979, 1982, 1994 and 2005. A fifth adventure, originally performed on stage in 1997, was edited and released as a movie in 2010.

The series bears many similarities to Monty Python's Flying Circus, as the three actors play nearly all the different roles in the series, often multiple roles in each episode. Usually, the series would have a main plot keeping the story and episodes together, but most of the content being semi-related or unrelated sketches. This is especially true for the first series Professor Drøvels Hemmelighet (1979), where the story frequently diverges from the main plot for entire episodes, only to jump back to the plot in the last minute. In the other series, the story is more centered on the actual plot.

The name "Dal" literally means "valley", and is a common Norwegian surname. The names of the characters (Gaus Dal, Roms Dal and Brumund Dal) are based on locations in Norway with the word "dal" in them (Gausdal, Romsdal and Brumunddal) and are not themselves common first names. The names of the brother's parents, Halling and Mari, similarly reference Hallingdal and Maridalen.

== Characters ==
=== Main characters ===
- Gaus Dal (born late 1940s). The oldest of the three brothers, and the brain of the three. Always sports a hat similar to that of Indiana Jones. Played by Lars Mjøen.
- Roms Dal (born late 1940s). The middle brother, and the more humorous and silly of the three. Always sports a brimmed Australian hat. Played by Knut Lystad.
- Brumund Dal (born late 1940s). The youngest brother, and the outside-the-box thinker. Always sports a propeller hat. Played by Trond Kirkvaag.
- The Narrator (Fortelleren) – while originally just a voice-over narrator whose main task it was to sum up the events of the previous episodes and make various absurd predictions about the next episode (as well as absurd comments and interjections during the actual events transpiring), but in Spektralsteinene he began developing into a character in his own right, making on-screen appearances and finally officially met the main characters. From then on, the three brothers would often interact with him, reacting and responding to his narration, often resulting in comical situations breaking the fourth wall. He was played by comedian Tom Mathisen.

=== Secondary characters ===
- Halling Dal (died before 1979), was the father of the three brothers, and leader of the fictional resistance group MILORD during World War II. He encountered his three sons during their time travels in Spektralsteinene, but they used false last names to avoid suspicion. He later promised to name his three sons after they helped him, meaning that the brothers are named after themselves. He was married to Mari Dal, and they both died some time prior to the first series, probably in the early 1970s based on comments made by the brothers when encountering them in Spektralsteinene.
- Snerting, Joste and Mette-Mari Dal are the teenaged nephews and niece of the three brothers, though it's deliberately left unclear who their parents are. They appear only in Karl XIIs Gamasjer. Snerting is played by Mads Buer, Joste by Martin Lotherington and Mette-Mari by Agnes Kittelsen.
- Prof. Kurt Drøvel – scientist and professor who disappeared during an expedition in the 1950s, with several rescue attempts in the following decades all failing. The Dal brothers set out to find him in 1979, eventually discovering his secret: a giant egg, but no signs of the professor. However, it turns out that the Professor was inside the egg, but with the experience having made him cluck like a chicken. He reappeared in cameos during the later series. He was played by Helge Reiss.
- Prof. Ledwin Slatters – scientist and professor who hopes to find a cure for the common cold using substances from an old meteorite. It is whilst helping prof. Slatters dig for a piece of the meteorite that the brothers accidentally find the first spectral stone, triggering the Spectral Stones adventure. He was played by Arne Bang-Hansen.

== Adventures ==
=== Prof. Drøvel's Secret (Professor Drøvels Hemmelighet) ===
Originally aired in 1979 with 13 episodes (15 minutes each, except the first and last episode, 25 minutes) The main plot of this adventure takes place on the fictional unexplored river Overfloden, where the brothers are searching for the long-lost professor Drøvel, who mysteriously disappeared while exploring the river 25 years earlier. However, the episodes frequently diverge from the main plot into unrelated sketches.

=== The Spectral Stones (Spektralsteinene) ===
Originally aired in 1982 with 13 episodes (15 minutes each, except the first and last episode, which are 25 minutes long). In this adventure, the brothers (with the help of a blueprint delivered by an alien spaceship) build a machine that travels through time and space, powered by the mysterious spectral stones, the source of incredible power. At each destination (which includes the Viking Age, the Old West, ancient Egypt, 18th century France, and a desert island) the brothers must find a new spectral stone in order to eventually get back to their own time.

=== The Legend of Atlant-Ice (Legenden om Atlant-Is) ===
Originally aired in 1994, with 12 episodes (20 minutes each). This adventure focus on the brothers' search for the lost sacred Saami city of Atlant-Is (Atlant-Ice), whilst investigating strange activities nearby. This was the first series to feature main characters other than the three brothers and narrator, and was originally planned to be the final series about the brothers.

=== The Mystery of Charles XII's spats (Mysteriet om Karl XIIs gamasjer) ===
Originally aired in 2005 with ten 30 minute episodes. With the 100th anniversary of the union dissolution approaching, the brothers must travel back in time to find King Charles XII's long-lost spats that disappeared some 300 years ago. If they do not recover the spats before the anniversary, Norway will be forced to re-enter a union with Sweden. This is the last series about the brothers, following Kirkvaag's death in 2007.

=== Planned fifth series ===
Following the success of the latest series, production was commissioned in 2006 for a fifth series, but Kirkvaag's illness delayed the project, ultimately bringing it to a halt as he began treatment. When it became clear that he was in no condition to film a full, new series, the project was scrapped in favor of a re-editing of their 1997 stage performance (See below).

=== The Curse of the Viking Sword (Vikingssverdets forbannelse) ===
Originally performed on stage in 1997, this adventure was edited and released as a feature film in 2010. Gaus and Roms are accidentally sent back in time to the Viking Age, while Brumund is left behind in the present, and must help his brothers get back to their own time via video link. After the failure to produce a fifth series, the two remaining members of the trio began working on the project in 2007, and it was released in theaters on 10 September 2010. Trond Kirkvaag's parts were recorded separately before his death from colorectal cancer, whilst the rest of the movie was edited from the 1997 recordings. Editing was completed in 2009, and it was released in 2010.

== Theme music ==
All the series have had different opening themes, but they all had the same trademark closing theme, the overture of The Eye of Wendor by Mandalaband. In the first three series the recording with Mandalaband was used, but for the fourth one a new recording was made by the Norwegian Radio Orchestra (Kringkastingsorkestret).

== Home media and streaming ==
In addition to several reruns since first being aired, the first two series were released on VHS in 1988. The third series were released on VHS in 1995, before all three series were re-released on DVD in 2000, albeit in non-restored forms, using the VHS masters. In 2010, all four series of the show were released on remastered DVDs both individually and as a box set.

No plans have been announced regarding a Blu-ray release. The first two series were shot on 35 mm film, whilst the third and fourth were shot digitally.

The show was made globally available on NRK TV (NRK's free-of-charge VoD service) in the late 2010s, although in Norwegian without subtitles.

== International broadcasts ==
In Sweden, the first 3 seasons were broadcast on SVT1, while Karl XIIs gamasjer was broadcast on SVT Barn.

In Finland, Spektralstenene and Legenden om Atlant-Is were aired on Yle, primarily Yle TV1. Vikingssverdets forbannelse aired occasionally on the Finnish version of Viasat Film Family in 2018.
