= Fosheim =

Fosheim may refer to:

- Fosheim Peninsula, located in western Ellesmere Island, a part of the Qikiqtaaluk Region of the Canadian territory of Nunavut
- Jon Fosheim (1923–2004), chief justice of the South Dakota Supreme Court
- Lage Fosheim (1958–2013), Norwegian record promoter and musician
- Minken Fosheim (1956–2018), Norwegian actress and author
