= Karl & Co =

- Created by: Tore Ryen
- Starring: Nils Vogt; Knut Lystad; Harald Heide-Steen Jr. Grethe Kausland; Minken Fosheim
- Country of origin: Norway
- No. of seasons: 3
- No. of episodes: 63

Production
- Executive producer: Tore Ryen
- Producers: Red Sand and TV 2
- Camera setup: Multi camera
- Running time: 25 mins (approx)

Original release
- Network: TV 2
- Release: 1998 – 2001

Related
- Mot i brøstet (1993–1997); Karl III (2009)

Karl & Co is a Norwegian situation comedy created by Tore Ryen, starring Nils Vogt reprising his role as Karl Reverud from the popular sitcom Mot i brøstet. It aired on TV 2, running for three seasons from 1998 to 2001, a total of 63 episodes.

By 2003, Karl & Co had been run three times. Together with the five runs of Mot i brøstet, the episodes had an accumulated viewership of 376 million.

== Cast ==
=== Main ===
- Nils Vogt as Karl Reverud
- Knut Lystad as Ulf Rasch Ludvigsen
- Harald Heide-Steen Jr. as Daniel Gasman Smestad
- Grethe Kausland as Ruth Frantzen
- Minken Fosheim as Vigdis Reverud

=== Recurring ===
- Turid Balke as Mrs. Smith
- Eldar Vågan as Torstein
- Wenche Foss as Karl and Vigdis' mother

== Plot ==
Following the events of the last episode of Mot i brøstet, Karl moves out of his old house and into a new apartment in downtown Oslo. There he gets acquainted with the chairman Ulf, the janitor Smestad and the cleaning maid Mrs. Frantzen. His sister Vigdis also comes to visit frequently.

== Episodes ==
Season	Episodes	Originally released	
Season	Episodes	First released	Last released
1	15	1998	1998
2	26	1999	2000
3	22	2000	2001

=== Season 1 (1998) ===
No. overall	No. in series	Title	Original release date
1	1	"Går på igjen (Part 1)"	1998
Karl moves into his new apartment and soon makes new friends.
2	2	"Går på igjen (Part 2)"	1998
Karl's mother comes back to Norway after living in the States for many years.
3	3	"Får aldri fred"	1998
Karl's new neighbor wants to take him into the world of erotic literature.
4	4	"Går i vannet"	1998
Karl achieves success with his marketing for a new slimming product and ends up on TV.
5	5	"På nye eventyr"	1998
Karl's mother sends him to an aerobics class.
6	6	"Rider igjen"	1998
Karl has to watch a neighbor's horse in his apartment.
7	7	"Møter veggen"	1998
Karl's mother moves into his apartment.
8	8	"I full forvirring"	1998
Karl is in love with the neighbor's niece, but soon he gets into trouble.
9	9	"Holder dampen oppe"	1998
Ulf suggests that the gang joins a national relay race.
10	10	"På ville veier"	1998
Karl's new sweater makes everyone think he's gay.
11	11	"I syvende himmel (Part 1)"	1998
Karl markets a new domestic appliance on TV Shop.
12	12	"I syvende himmel (Part 2)"	1998
Karl gets big-headed after his appearance on TV Shop.
13	13	"I festhumør"	1998
Smestad starts singing and Karl becomes his manager.
14	14	"Den gode hjelper"	1998
Karl is fed up with all the advertising mails in his mailbox.
15	15	"På farten"	1998
Karl is happy in love, but how long will it last?

=== Season 2 (1999–2000) ===
No. overall	No. in series	Title	Original release date
16	1	"I lykkerus"	1999
Ulf decides to start a cake lottery, while Smestad has found the lady in his life.
17	2	"Lykkerusen går videre"	TBA
Karl has to share his apartment with his sister Vigdis' boyfriend, Torstein.
18	3	"Store planer"	TBA
Vigdis and Torstein want to get married on New Year's Eve.
19	4	"Penger er ikke alt"	TBA
The city treasurer wants to take a look in Karl's books.
20	5	"Det hoper seg opp"	TBA
Karl orders a car vacuum cleaner from a mail-order catalogue, but he's in for a surprise when he receives the package.
21	6	"Høyt henger dem"	TBA
Ulf has to take over as janitor when Smestad calls in sick.
22	7	"Når lykken smiler"	TBA
Ulf's wife Magda has won the lottery, and Ulf asks Karl for advice on how to invest the money.
23	8	"Den søte juletid"	TBA
It's Christmas, and everyone's excited. Especially Ulf.
24	9	"På usikker grunn"	TBA
Karl wants to join an exclusive wine club. The only problem is he doesn't know anything about wine.
25	10	"Skumle symptomer"	TBA
Karl discovers a lump in his chest.
26	11	"Det klør, det klør, tiddelibom"	TBA
Karl's marketing a new washing powder, but suddenly he gets an itch.
27	12	"Valgets kvaler"	TBA
It's time for the election of a chairman of the building. Ulf is confident he's gonna win again, but discovers he's in hard competition.
28	13	"På salg"	TBA
Vigdis buys a chest of drawers for Karl.
29	14	"Prøv lykken"	TBA
Vigdis is looking for a new man and contacts a marriage agency.
30	15	"Et skikkelig mannfolk"	TBA
Karl thinks Ulf is a pushover and tells him to be a man and stand up to Magda.
31	16	"Den eneste rette"	TBA
Ulf thinks Karl is lonely, so he tries to hook him up with some of Magda's friends. One of them happens to be a famous Playboy model.
32	17	"Borte bra, men hjemme best"	TBA
Ulf plans to enter a poetry contest where the first prize is a cruise trip.
33	18	"God bedring"	TBA
While Karl ends up on hospital with stomach pains, the gang uses his apartment for a poker game.
34	19	"Den uheldige vinner"	TBA
Karl finds out Smestad has stolen money.
35	20	"En overraskelse kommer sjelden alene"	TBA
Ulf wants to celebrate Karl's birthday, but Karl wants nothing of it.
36	21	"Kjære venn"	TBA
Karl wants to move into an exclusive apartment complex, but his friends won't let him leave.
37	22	"Deilig er jorden"	TBA
Ulf is convinced the world is about to end and starts an environmental organization.
38	23	"Store ord og fleskefett"	TBA
Karl has to lend his apartment to Vigdis when she gets a job as a cosmetics salesman.
39	24	"Familieidyll"	TBA
Ulf and Magda gets a visit from Magda's sister and brother-in-law.
40	25	"Hele folket i arbeid"	TBA
It's time to start working and cleaning in Karl's block.
41	26	"Det glade budskap"	2000
Karl is asked to market a new shampoo.

=== Season 3 (2000–01) ===
No. overall	No. in series	Title	Original release date
42	1	"En sten til byrden"	2000
Karl has a kidney stone and his friends are concerned.
43	2	"En topp modell"	TBA
Unwittingly Ulf becomes a nude model.
44	3	"Full Pott"	TBA
Mrs. Frantzen comes up with a new football pool system, while Karl and Ulf have a falling out.
45	4	"Et viktig vedtak"	TBA
Karl and Ulf argue about the building of a gazebo and Smestad accidentally runs over a neighbor's dog.
46	5	"Lyse utsikter"	TBA
Karl tries to market Magda's homemade chocolate.
47	6	"Tjukke slekta"	TBA
Vigdis is obsessed about genealogy and finds out that she and Karl are related to the Royal family of Norway.
48	7	"I beste mening"	TBA
A new neighbor has moved into the block and the gang puts on a welcome party for him.
49	8	"Evig Din"	TBA
Mrs. Frantzen has found the love of her life - Smestad.
50	9	"Kjærleik og rosa drømmer (Part 1)"	TBA
Mrs. Frantzen moves in with Smestad and Vigdis finds a new man.
51	10	"Kjærleik og rosa drømmer (Part 2)"	TBA
Ulf is on Who Wants to Be a Millionaire? and Karl tries to help out.
52	11	"Gode råd er dyre"	TBA
Smestad decides to go to Germany to get further education in the janitor work.
53	12	"På solsiden"	TBA
Vigdis starts a tanning place and Karl is eager to make some money off it.
54	13	"Til tjeneste"	TBA
Vigdis has trouble getting customers to her tanning place and Ulf gets a new job.
55	14	"Velvære i bøtter og spann"	TBA
Smestad is back from Germany.
56	15	"Den store dagen nærmer seg"	TBA
The big day for Mrs. Frantzen and Smestad is approaching.
57	16	"Tre menn og en liten sofa"	TBA
Smestad and Ulf have to move in with Karl.
58	17	"Har du en femmer"	TBA
Karl's having success with his new marketing project, and his friends take advantage of that.
59	18	"Evig ung?"	TBA
Ulf starts a newspaper and Vigdis is concerned about her breasts.
60	19	"Stå på krava"	TBA
Smestad goes on strike and Ulf and Karl try to negotiate with him.
61	20	"Smil til fotografen"	TBA
Ulf takes photography lessons and uses his friends as models.
62	21	"Det stunder til (Part 1)"	TBA
Smestad starts having cold feet about his wedding with Mrs. Frantzen.
63	22	"Det stunder til (Part 2)"	2001
After many trials and tribulations, Smestad and Mrs. Frantzen finally get married.

== Tusenårsfesten ==
Tusenårsfesten was a direct-to-video special released in 1999, featuring characters of both Karl&Co and its predecessor, Mot i Brøstet. Originally 56 minutes, it was edited down to a double episode (running 47 minutes in total) for television and DVD. These cuts have made VHS copies and rips attractive as it is the only unedited version available.

The episodes see Karl and the other tenants planning a big party to celebrate the end of the millennia, when circumstances cause a reunion between Karl and Nils, triggering a big party with all their old friends invited.
