= Tore Ryen =

Norwegian revue and television writer (1946–2026)

Tore Jarl Ryen (30 December 1946 – 8 May 2026) was a Norwegian revue and television writer.

== Life and career ==
Tore Jarl Ryen was born on 30 December 1946. He was behind several sitcoms aired on TV 2. Mot i brøstet, Karl & Co and Karl III starred Nils Vogt as "Karl Reverud"; in addition Ryen created Holms and Radio 2. He won a Gullruten award in 2001.

Ryen died on 8 May 2026, at the age of 79. He was the father of Adam Ryen.
