= Eivind Rølles =

- Born: March 15, 1959; Bestum, Oslo
- Origin: Norway
- Died: 18 March 2013 (aged 54)
- Genres: Ska; pop
- Occupations: Musician; songwriter; composer
- Instrument: Guitar

Eivind Rølles (15 March 1959 Bestum in Oslo — 18 March 2013) was a Norwegian musician (guitar) best known for his time with pop duo The Monroes. prior to this, he was a member of the bands Broadway News and PVC.

== Biography ==
Rølles was repertoar and recording manager and marketing director of the Norwegian departments of the multinational record companies BMG and EMI for several years, and otherwise later worked in the firm Impress. In addition, he performed with his band The Fabulous Couldhavebeens who participated in «Kroghshow» with Hanne Krogh already in 1989, and in 2009 had members Hans Aaseth on guitar, Håkon Iversen on bass and vocals, Lenny Kittilsen vocals, Arvid Solvang guitar, Totto Hansen drums, and Arild Bjerkeli vocals, dancing, and percussion.

After a prolonged cancer disease Eivind Rølles, he died at the age of 54.

== Discography ==
=== The Monroes ===
- Sunday People (1983)
- Face Another Day (1985)
- Everything's Forgiven (1987)
- Long Way Home (1993)
- Absolute Monroes (1993)

Singles

- Sunday People/Move in Closer (1983)
- On the Bus/Mrs. M (1984)
- Cheerio/Beating of a Lovers Heart (1985)
- Let's Go/Beating of a Lover's Heart (1985)
- (Stay With Me) Jeanette/How Strong Is Your Love (1986)
- Wish You Were Here/Lady on 5th Avenue (1986)
- I Call It Love/I'll Return to You (1987)
- Let Them Out of There/If Only You Could See Me Now (1987)
- Be Alright/Watching the Fools (1987)
- All Those Years Ago/Watching the Fools (1988)
- Just Another Normal Day (1993)
- Sun Goes Up (1993)
- Tsjeriåu (2005), with Ravi and DJ Løv

=== Broadway News ===
Albums

- Banco (1981)
- Beste Vol. 1 (1983)

Singler

- Morgenda'n er vår/Se på meg (1981)

=== PVC ===
- Emile Berliner (1981)

=== Participations ===
- Diverse: På gang 11 (1983)
- Beate: Like a River/Strand Hotel (1984)
- Diverse: Årets topp hits 1984 (1984)
- Beate: Like a River (1984)
- Lars Kilevold: Another Rainy Monday/Raindance (1985)
- Forente artister: Sammen for livet (1985)
- Valentine: City of Dreams/Nothing to Fear (1985)
- Diverse: Postens sommerkassett (1985)
- Bobbysocks: Waiting for the Morning/Working Heart (1986)
- Bobbysocks: Waiting for the Morning (1986)
- Tom Mathisen & Herodes Falsk: Fusk (1986)
- Anita Skorgan: White Magic (1986)
- Flamingokvintetten: Flickan från Heidelberg (1986)
- Lena Philipsson: Cheerio/Det går väl an (1986)
- Vindél: Perfect Crime (1986)
- Diverse: Momentos de Amor (1986)
- Lena Philipsson: Dansa i neon (1987)
- Diverse: Den originale fotballkassetten '87 (1987)
- Diverse: Love Tracks (1987)
- Karoline Krüger: Fasetter (1988)
- Kikki Danielsson: Let Them Walk in the Sunshine/Waiting for the Morning (1988)
- Lena Philipsson: Hit-låtar med Lena Philipsson 1985–1987 (1988)
- Hanne Krogh: Hanne (1989)
- Ute til lunch: Seier'n er vår (1989)
- Adrian Z: Balcony Dreams/Dancers (1989)
- Anita Skorgan: Basic (1990)
- Adrian Z: All These Songs (1990)
- Diverse: Uhørt! (1990)
- Hanne Krogh: Ta meg til havet (1992)
- Grethe Svensen: The Right to Sing (1992)
- Rypdal & Tekrø: Rypdal & Tekrø (1994)
- Hanne Krogh: 40 beste (1994)
- Guys in Disguise: Guys in Disguise (1994)
- Elisabeth Andreassen: Elisabeth Andreassens bästa 1981–1995 (1995)
- Lena Philipsson: Lena Philipsson (1995)
- Dusty Cowshit: Østenfor Soon, Western for Råde (1996)
- Elisabeth Andreassen: Eternity (1996)
- Wenche Myhre: Vannmann (1997)
- Elisabeth Andreasson: 20 bästa (1997)
- Smurfene: Smurfehits 3 (1997)
- Andersen, Øren, Røe & Rosén: Ri stormen av (1997)
- Lars Kilevold: Kjip Lunch – Kilevolds Greatest Hits (1997)
- Krem: Venner (1998)
- Diverse: Tande-P: Mine favoritter (2000)
- Sven-Bertil Taube: Sven-Bertil Taube sjunger Evert Taube: De beste 1970–2000 (2000)
- Diverse: Perleporten (2000)
- The Shadows: Kon-Tiki – De beste 1960–1980 (2001)
- Odd: Stay (2001)
- Sven-Bertil Taube: Ett samlingsalbum 1959–2001 (2001)
- Sons of Angels: Slumber With the Lions (2001)
- Re-Pita: Re-Play – Re-Pita Mania 2 (2004)
- Ravi & DJ Løv: Den nye arbæidsdagn (2005)
- Diverse: McMusic Hits 2005 (2005)
- Grandiosa: Respekt for grandiosa (2006)
- Diverse: Melodi Grand Prix 2008 (2008)
- Maria Haukaas Storeng: Hold On Be Strong (2008)
- Diverse: Landeplage (2008)
- Diverse: P4 Sommerstemninger (2008)
- Diverse: McMusic 42 (2008)
- Kikki Danielsson: Kikkis bästa (2008)
- Diverse: Lego hits (2008)
- Torstein Sødal: Torstein Sødal (2008)
- Diverse: P4 Julestemning (2009)
- Bobbysocks: Let It Swing – The Best of Bobbysocks (2010)
- CC Cowboys: 40 beste (2011)
- Nora Foss Al-Jabri: Somewhere Beautiful (2012)
- Elisabeth Andreassen: De fineste (2014)
