= Hilde Lyrån =

Norwegian actress, dancer and comedian (born 1963)

- Born: 2 January 1963 (age 63); Grorud Valley, Oslo, Norway
- Occupations: Actress, dancer and comedian

Hilde Lyrån (born 2 January 1963 in the Grorud Valley, Oslo, Norway) is a Norwegian actress, dancer and comedian. She is best known for her roles as Trine in the Norwegian situation comedy Mot i brøstet and Karin in the comedy-drama Seks som oss.

== Select filmography ==
- 2011, 2012– - Hotel Cæsar
- 2007 - Switch
- 2004 - Olsenbanden Jr. på rocker'n
- 2004 - Seks som oss (TV series)
- 2002 - Hilde & Brede show (TV series)
- 2000 - Vazelina Hjulkalender (TV series)
- 1995 - Mot i brøstet (TV series)

== Dubbing roles ==
- 2010 - "Tangled" (2010) -Mother Gothel (Norwegian dub)
