= Minken Fosheim =

Norwegian actress and author (1956–2018)

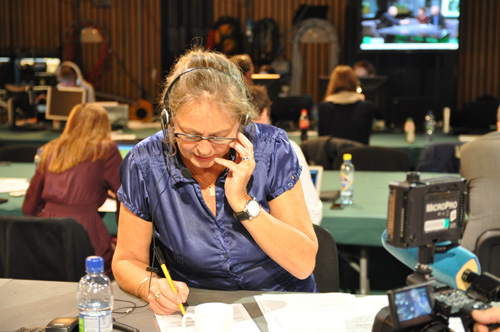
- Fosheim in 2011
- Born: Birte Fosheim; March 20, 1956; Oslo, Norway
- Died: June 7, 2018 (aged 62); Oslo, Norway
- Occupations: Actress, writer
- Spouse: André Wienskol
- Website: http://minkens.no

Birte Fosheim Wienskol (20 March 1956 – 7 June 2018), better known as Minken Fosheim, was a Norwegian actress and author, best known for her children's books about famous composers, and her role as Vigdis Reverud in the 1990s sitcom Karl & Co.

== Biography ==
Fosheim graduated from the Norwegian National Academy of Theatre, after which she appeared in various roles on stage, film, and television. Rather than working under a permanent contract with any particular theater, she worked as a freelancer. In the 1980s and 90s she became a well known face on Norwegian television, frequently appearing in comedy shows playing stereotypically dim character, with her most famous role being Vigdis Reverud in the sitcom Karl & Co from 1998 to 2001. In her later career, she also had success writing historical books for children about composers, like Mozart, Grieg and Vivaldi. She also ran Barne- og ungdomsteateret (The Children and Youth Theatre), an educational institution with 170 children, from her home in Oslo,

Her brother was the musician Lage Fosheim, known from the band The Monroes. She was married to André Wienskol – originally from France – whom she met when she was 21. Together they have two sons. They remained married until her death. Their oldest son, Tobias, also had a small role on the Norwegian TV-series Nr. 13.

=== Death ===
Fosheim was diagnosed with terminal pancreatic cancer in early 2018, and died from the illness on 7 June 2018, aged 62.

== Select filmography ==
- "Fruen fra havet" (TV, 1979)
- Den som henger i en tråd (TV, 1980)
- Little Ida (1981)
- Svarta fåglar (1983)
- Viva Villaveien! (1989)
- A Handful of Time (1990)
- "Karl & Co" (TV, 1998-2001)
- Tsatsiki, morsan och polisen (1999)
- Sofies verden (2000)
