= Braathens SAFE Flight 253 =

1956 aviation accident

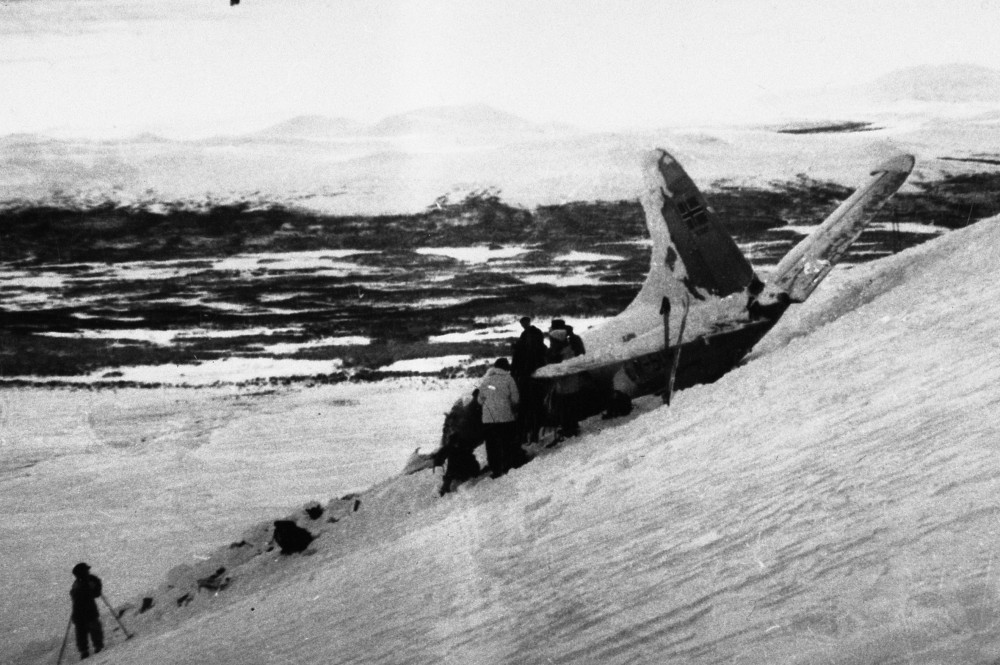
- Crash site of Flight 253

Accident
- Date: 7 November 1956
- Summary: Crashed due to icing conditions
- Site: Hummelfjell; 62.404°N 11.281°E

Aircraft
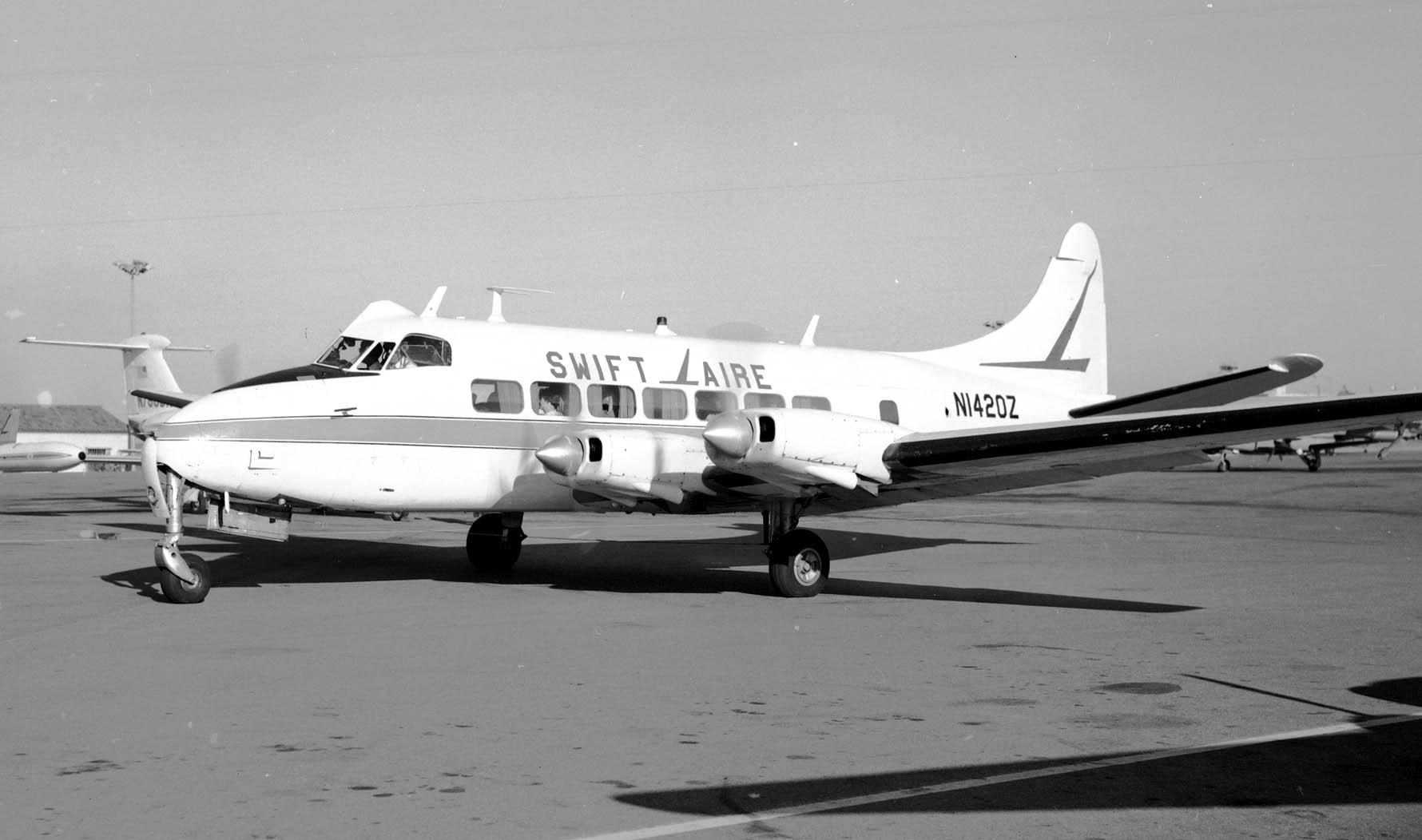
- A DeHavilland Heron similar to the accident aircraft
- Aircraft type: de Havilland DH-114 Heron 2B
- Aircraft name: Lars
- Operator: Braathens SAFE
- Registration: LN-SUR
- Flight origin: Trondheim Airport, Værnes
- Destination: Oslo Airport, Fornebu
- Occupants: 12
- Passengers: 10
- Crew: 2
- Fatalities: 2
- Injuries: 10
- Survivors: 10

Braathens SAFE Flight 253, also known as the Hummelfjell Accident (Norwegian: Hummelfjell-ulykken), occurred on 7 November 1956 at 9:50, when a de Havilland Heron crashed into Hummelfjell mountain in Tolga Municipality, Norway. The Braathens SAFE aircraft was en route from Trondheim Airport, Værnes to Oslo Airport, Fornebu. While passing Røros, the Heron started experiencing a rapid atmospheric icing which soon was too extensive for the ice protection system to handle. Combined with a downdraft, the aircraft lost sufficient lift to stay airborne. The pilots were able to turn the aircraft around, but it nevertheless hit Hummelfjell at an altitude of 1,350 meters (4,430 ft) above mean sea level.

The aircraft's captain was killed on impact, and a passenger died shortly afterwards. Ten people survived the crash, which was the first fatal accident of a Braathens SAFE. Among the survivors was Rolf Kirkvaag, at the time Norway's most popular radio host. The search and rescue operation was severely hindered by a blizzard and poor visibility. Kirkvaag and another person left the plane after a day and met a rescue party. The investigation concluded that neither technical faults with the aircraft nor pilot error played a part in the incident, and that it was not possible to predict the weather conditions which caused the icing.

== Flight ==
The accident aircraft was a de Havilland DH-114 Heron 2B with registration LN-SUR, serial number 14093, and named Lars. It was purchased new by Braathens SAFE, and was registered on 8 February 1956. Herons had been introduced in Braathens SAFE's fleet in 1952 and remained in service until 1960. Lars was insured by Lloyd's.

Flight 253 was a scheduled morning service from Trondheim Airport, Værnes to Oslo Airport, Fornebu, with a nominal flight time of one and a half hours. It carried a crew of two and ten passengers. Among the passengers was Rolf Kirkvaag, a radio host and journalist for the Norwegian Broadcasting Corporation. He was at the time the channel's most popular host, specializing in quiz programs, and has been described as Norway's first national celebrity.

The flight departed Værnes at 8:30. It climbed to a cruising altitude of 2,500 meters (8,000 ft) and passed Tolga Radio Beacon at 09:12. In the area around Røros, the aircraft started to experience icing, which quickly rose to levels that could not be handled by the ice protection system. The aircraft was further subject to a downdraft. The pilots therefore chose to turn around and return to Trondheim. However, the icing was so rapid that the aircraft lost altitude very quickly. The plane was also flying through a blizzard with poor visibility, making navigation difficult.

In addition to adversely affecting aerodynamic lift, the ice covered the windshield and radio antenna, causing radio communication to be cut. The pilots were therefore not able to navigate properly, and were not aware that they were flying over the mountain. The aircraft hit Hummelfjell at 09:50 at an altitude of 1,350 meters (4,430 ft) in Tolga Municipality. The aircraft was traveling 300 kilometers per hour (160 kn; 190 mph) at the impact, striking the ground tail-first. The engines were broken off by the impact, while the aircraft continued to slide along the snow. The aircraft bounced once before settling in a snow dune, which limited the impact forces considerably and presumably saved many passengers' lives.

== Rescue ==
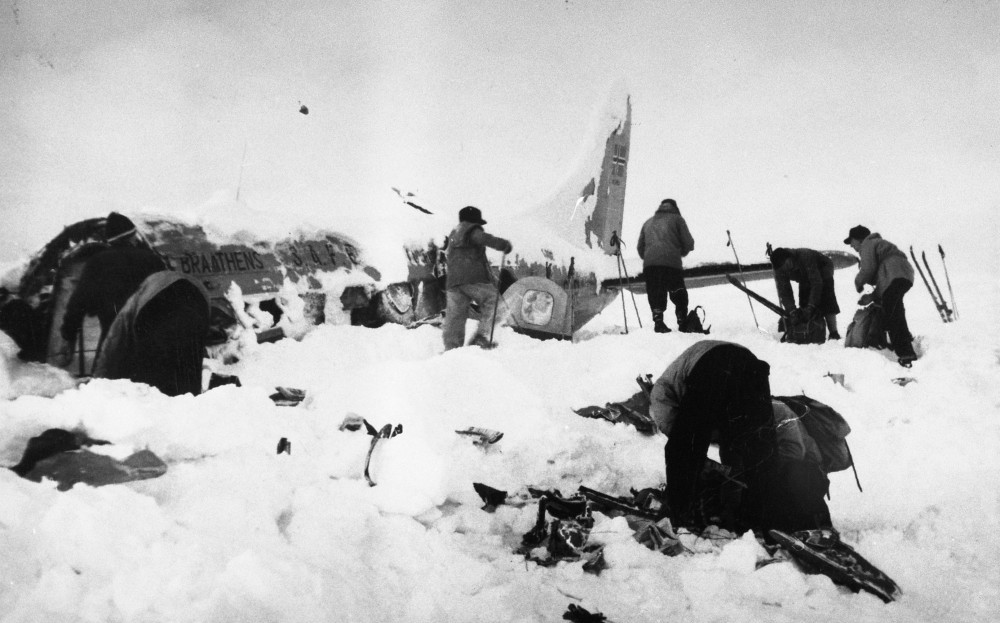
Rescue activities at the crash site

Ten people survived the crash. The captain was killed in the crash, and a passenger died sometime later of heart problems related to the stress of the accident. The accident occurred in an isolated area, in bad weather, and at a very inaccessible site for the search and rescue party. The passengers stayed at the crash site for a day, waiting for rescue. Kirkvaag was aware of the dangers to the injured and frozen passengers if they should fall asleep. He introduced a roll-call every ten minutes, and Kirkvaag improvised a radio program to keep up spirits. The accident and rescue operations generated a large media interest, especially via radio, which was compounded by a celebrity being amongst the passengers.

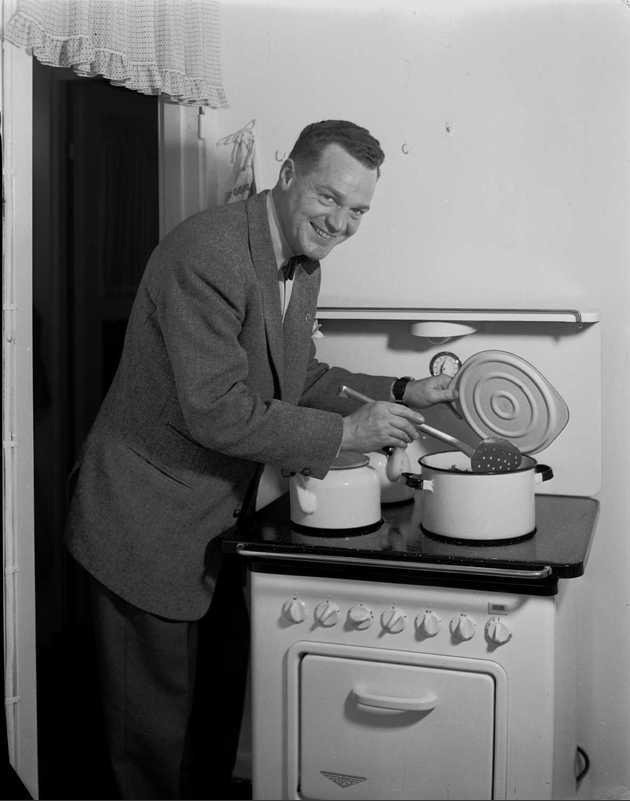
Rolf Kirkvaag in September 1955

The rescue site was covered in snow and fog, making the search and rescue operation very difficult. Visibility was so poor that the searchers would have had to stumble directly upon the aircraft to find it. It was estimated that there was about 20 meters (66 ft) of visibility at the site. Searches with aircraft were carried out, but were futile, as they were not able to see the wreckage from the air. In addition, authorities at first did not know the location of the crash site. Initially, all that was known was that the plane was located somewhere between Trondheim and Oslo, probably in Østerdalen. Later, there came reports from the area around Hummelfjell that people had heard a great crash, and the search was subsequently concentrated in that area.

The search was led by Police Inspector Oppegård. On 8 November, a team of twenty-eight people started search for the aircraft around Hummelfjell, based on reports of a loud sound in the area. They set up a base of operations at a farm at Brend, which was able to feed and house the entire group of military and volunteer personnel. Rescuers had two M29 Weasel tracked vehicles, but these were unusable. A search area of 10 by 20 kilometers (6.2 by 12.4 mi) was then mapped out between Gråhøgda and Grøtvolen. Simultaneously, a group of Home Guard personnel were sent to the other, Atna side of the mountain to search.

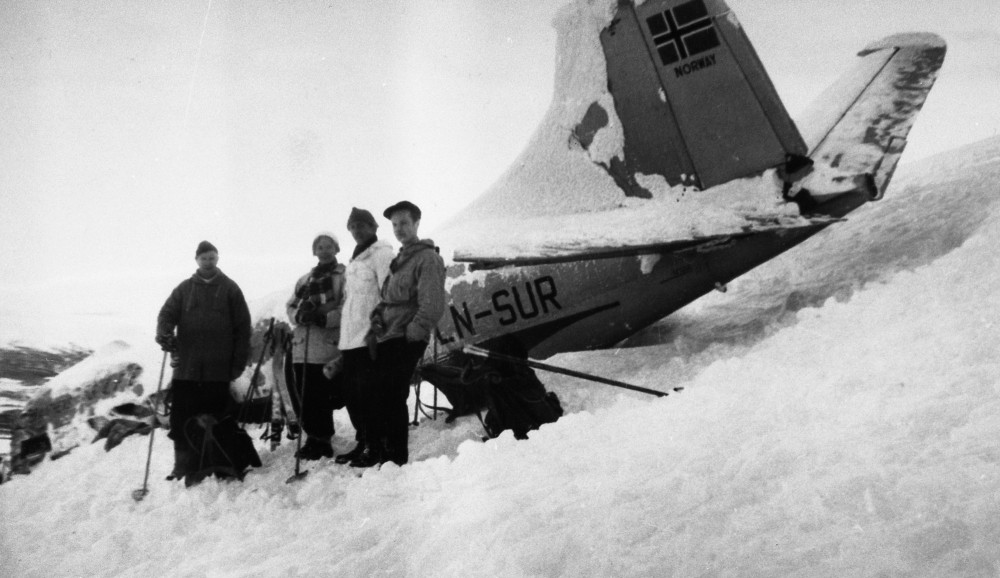
The tail section

After spending about twenty-four hours at the accident site, and without any sign of the blizzard dying down, Kirkvaag— who had two fractures in his leg— and another passenger chose to go for help. Lacking skis, they were forced to walk through the deep snow. Kirkevaag later stated that he had left in a state of panic, not wanting to die at the crash site. The pair soon found a river bed, which they followed in the hopes of finding someone. Visibility remained poor, at about 20 meters (66 ft). However, the duo stumbled upon two skiers from Hodalen, who happened to be tracking them. Kirkvaag later commented that he was so delirious that he thought he was out skiing and that the two wanted to pass, so he stepped aside. The skiers were able to alert rescue coordinators, and an initial rescue crew arrived at the site at 12:30, twenty-seven hours after the accident. It took hours to complete the rescue, and several people were carried out on stretchers made from parts of the aircraft.

== Investigation ==
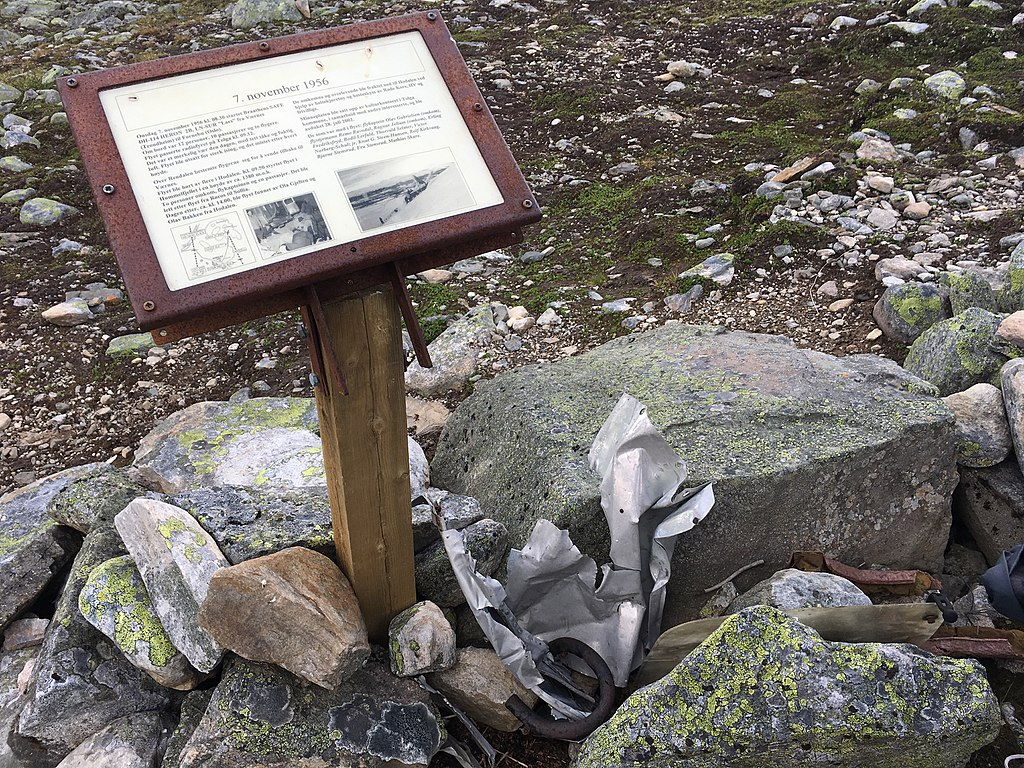
Memorial plate in Norwegian

A commission was appointed to investigate the accident. Representatives from the Royal Norwegian Air Force and de Havilland inspected the wreckage on 11 November, concluding that the aircraft was a write-off. The investigative commission published a preliminary report on 20 November, and a final report was published on 9 May 1957.

The commission rejected the notion that the aircraft did not have a sufficiently potent ice protection system, stating that Herons were equipped with a better system than comparable aircraft. It stated that no contemporary ice protections system would have been capable of de-icing the aircraft given the conditions. Members found no faults with the pilot's actions. They also recommended that airlines equip aircraft with additional first-aid and survival equipment.

The commission found that the aircraft was subject to so much icing that even if it had steered clear of Hummelfjell, it would still have been forced to land within a short time, or it would have inevitably crashed. Icing happened extremely rapidly, and the commission found that the pilots' choice to turn back could not have happened earlier. It stated that the weather data that the pilots received at Værnes did not predict the conditions which led to the icing. However, it found that had the pilots conferred in person with a meteorologist concerning the weather along the whole route, the conditions might have been predicted. The commission recommended that such procedures be developed.

Flight 253 was the third write-off of a Heron and the second fatal accident of that type. The accident was Braathens SAFE's first fatal accident. Along with Flight 239 in 1972, which killed 40 people, they would be the only fatal accidents in the airline's history. A memorial has been erected at the crash site.

Parts from Flight 253 were afterwards used to rebuild two other Herons: LN-NPI, damaged on 26 January 1957, and LN-SUL.

== See also ==
- Prinair Flight 277 – another commercial Heron that also crashed into a mountain

== Bibliography ==
- Hagby, Kay (1998). Fra Nielsen & Winther til Boeing 747 (in Norwegian). Drammen: Hagby.
- Tjomsland, Audun; Wilsberg, Kjell (1996). Braathens SAFE 50 år: Mot alle odds (in Norwegian). Oslo. ISBN 82-990400-1-9.
