= Karl III (TV series) =

- Created by: Tore Ryen
- Starring: Nils Vogt; Bjørn Sundquist; Nina Woxholtt; Håvard Bakke
- Country of origin: Norway
- No. of seasons: 1
- No. of episodes: 12

Production
- Executive producer: Tore Ryen
- Camera setup: Multi-camera
- Running time: 25 minutes

Original release
- Network: TV 2
- Release: 23 February – 1 May 2009

Related
- Mot i brøstet (1993–1997); Karl & Co (1998–2001)

Karl III is a Norwegian sitcom that aired on TV 2 in 2009. It is a sequel to Mot i brøstet and Karl & Co. Upon its release it was heavily criticized by both critics and viewers for departing from the series' original style. It was cancelled after one season.

== Cast ==
Regulars:

- Nils Vogt as Karl Reverud
- Bjørn Sundquist as Roy Butler
- Nina Woxholtt as Agnes Marie Stangfeldt
- Håvard Bakke as Børre Tryvann-Larssen

== Plot ==
The plot revolves around Karl Reverud, now a wealthy man, who has moved to Aker Brygge with his wife Agnes Marie and his butler Roy.

== Production ==
Shooting of Karl III started in 2008, and a total of 12 episodes was ordered for the first season. The first episode premiered on TV 2 on 23 February 2009. Unlike Mot i brøstet and Karl & Co, Karl III was filmed without a live audience. The show was cancelled after its first season due to low ratings and negative reviews from both media and viewers.

== Reception ==
The show was met with universally negative reviews, getting an average of 2 out of six stars. It was also slaughtered by the viewers in polls. Ultimately, along with low ratings, this led to the series' cancellation.
