= Mot i brøstet =

- Created by: Tore Ryen
- Starring: Arve Opsahl; Nils Vogt; Sven Nordin; Siw Anita Andersen (season 4 onwards); Hilde Lyrån (season 5 onwards)
- Theme music composer: Reg Zebastian
- Country of origin: Norway
- No. of seasons: 8
- No. of episodes: 142 (list of episodes)

Production
- Executive producer: Tore Ryen
- Producers: Red Sand and TV 2
- Camera setup: Multi-camera
- Running time: 24–28 minutes

Original release
- Network: TV 2
- Release: 22 January 1993 – 8 December 1997

Related
- Karl & Co (1998–2001); Karl III (2009)

Mot i Brøstet is a Norwegian television sitcom created by Tore Ryen. Originally broadcast on TV 2 from 22 January 1993 to 8 December 1997, it was the first commercially produced comedy series in Norway, and as of 2025 is the longest running Norwegian comedy series ever created. Since its original broadcast the series has been repeated frequently and also released on DVD in 2007 and 2018.

A very popular series with high viewing figures throughout all eight series, while being both controversial and often criticized, it lasted for 141 episodes and spawned two spin-offs, Karl & Co (1998–2001) and Karl III (2009).

== Overview ==
The series follows Karl Reverud (Nils Vogt), economist and accountant, after he is fired from his job and subsequently divorced by his greedy wife. After being helped out by his former colleague, Nils Svendsen (Sven Nordin) and a travelling salesman, Henry Rasmus Pettersen (Arve Opsahl), the three become roommates. The first three series usually focused on single-episode stories, like most sitcoms, usually involving a plot to get rich in a hurry with disastrous results. It also had a large number of celebrity guest appearances, often closely related to the schemes attempted by the main characters. The early series also saw the introduction of many recurring characters, such as Nils' mother Elna (Liv Thorsen), and Karls' girlfriend Målfrid (Siw Anita Andersen).

During the fourth series, Målfrid moved in with Karl – promoting Andersen to main cast, while Nils' girlfriend Trine (Hilde Lyrån) was introduced as a new recurring character; later becoming part of the main cast in series six. Trine was absent for the latter half of series 7 and first episodes of series 8, as the character worked as an au pair in Paris, France for six months (in reality, Lyrån was pregnant). As the seventh series finished airing, it was announced that a thirteen-episode eighth series would be the last. In the final episodes, Karl is finally experiencing some success with his company, Nils and Trine discover they are expecting children, Elna marries Henry (with some reluctance from the groom), and move to Spain, while Målfrid is contemplating moving to Africa, after being offered a job with NORAD.

== Characters ==
- Karl Reverud (Nils Vogt), an economist and accountant who loses his job at the start of the series and later starts his own consulting firm. Known for his short fuse, temper and outbursts, and his many schemes to make money in a hurry.
- Henry Rasmus Pettersen (Arve Opsahl), a retired "jack-of-all-trades" who worked as a travelling salesman before moving in with Karl and Nils. Known for his wit and wisdom, he is usually the sensible among the three.
- Nils Svendsen (Sven Nordin), a former janitor with an adolescent mind and a love for bananas, candy and Coca-Cola. Nils is often the center of trouble, and frequently drives the other two mad.
- Målfrid (Siw Anita Andersen, recurring series 1–3, main cast series 4–8), Karls girlfriend and a nurse by trade, and often the one who has to clean up the mess made by the other three.
- Trine (Hilde Lyrån, recurring series 4–5, main cast series 6–8), Nils' girlfriend who is basically his female counterpart.
- Elna Dorothea Isabella Raklerud Svendsen (Pettersen from S8 E13) (Liv Thorsen, recurring), Nils' overbearing, strict and hypochondriac mother, whose regular visits to the house drive the others mad, especially Karl.

== Production ==
The original idea for the show came from Tore Ryen, who had moved back to Norway in early 1992 after eight years working with Aaron Spelling in California. Ryen was contacted by the newly formed commercial network TV2, who wanted to produce a new sitcom for the evening lineup. Ryen agreed to produce a series of thirteen episodes. According to Ryen, the show was based on several American sitcoms, most notably Three's Company, but with a "very Norwegian tone and humour". While Ryen was the executive producer and director, the first series was primarily written by American television writers Joel Alexander and Willy Greenwald.

The episodes were usually rehearsed and reviewed between Tuesday and Friday, with final run-through Saturday before finally being recorded on Sunday afternoons in front of a live studio audience at Red Sand Studios in Oslo. The first recording session – which produced the first two episodes – took place on 1 December 1992, two months behind schedule. Following the success of the first series, the series was immediately picked up for two further series, bringing the total number of episodes to 39. Eventually, these were produced and filmed near-consecutively over a span of 42 weeks in 1993, the biggest television production in Norway at the time. Following the departure of Alexander and Greenwald after the first series, most of the remaining seven series were written by Tore Ryen, Ellen Waaler and Nils Vogt, with occasional guest writers.

In 1995, Siw Anita Andersen was promoted to main cast during the fourth series in an attempt to attract more female and family viewers. The fifth series saw the introduction of Trine (Hilde Lyrån), who became a main cast member in the sixth series. As the seventh series came to an end in 1996, Nordin told series creator Tore Ryen and his fellow cast that he wanted to depart the show. Concurrently, Opsahl was struggling with increasing health issues, which had already reduced his number of appearances in the preceding series, and eventually an agreement was made to make a shortened eighth series to finish the story. The story went public a few months later in early 1997. The final series was noticeably different from the previous ones in that more pre-recorded location footage was used in order to reduce the number of live tapings needed, lessening the workload for the actors. In addition, the twelve episodes of the eighth series was filmed in only six tapings, with two episodes filmed every Sunday and location footage shot before and after. The final two episodes were taped in September 1997 and aired on 1 and 8 December 1997, four years after the first taping. In later interviews, Nordin revealed that he had decided to quit years before, citing a growing frustration with his character and what he described as "lazy writing and storytelling", but that he hesitated in doing so as the show was at the height of its popularity and created a lot of jobs.

== Reception and criticism ==
While the series was an instant success with especially younger audiences, the response from critics was less enthusiastic. One of the more critical and often repeated reviews was that of Stavanger Aftenblad, who described the series as "vulgar, childish and a terrible influence for young viewers." As the show progressed, reviews became more mixed, but it remained controversial and heavily criticized by especially conservative and older viewers.

Despite a lack of good reviews and little marketing, viewing figures for the series remained high throughout all eight series, with the show being the second most watched fictional series in Norway in both 1994 and 1995.

== Tusenårsfesten and spin-offs ==
Immediately following the final tapings, Ryen and Vogt announced a spin-off that would enable the character Karl to continue on, albeit with an altered premise and cast. Ryen had previously considered a spin-off that would follow Nils and Trine, but the idea was abandoned when Nordin left in 1997, and the idea of a Karl-centric spin-off was chosen instead. Footage for the first episode of the upcoming spin-off was actually filmed the day after the final taping of "Mot i brøstet", using the old sets prior to dismantling for an opening scene that would bridge the two shows. The show premiered in early 1998 to favorable reviews, and continued for 63 episodes until 2001.

In 1999 a straight-to-video movie entitled Tusenårsfesten ('The Millennium Party') was released, bringing together the main characters from both Mot i brøstet and Karl & Co (with the exception of Trine). It explained how Nils and Trine now had four children, triplet boys and a girl, and still lived in Elna's old apartment. Henry and Elna were still in Spain, running their Norwegian restaurant, while Målfrid had gotten engaged to an African doctor in her new job. It had its TV premiere on TV 2 in 2001, and was re-released on DVD in 2007, albeit both of these in a heavily edited form, which has caused the VHS tapes of the original cut to become highly attractive to fans.<note>The VHS version is 56 minutes, while the TV/DVD version is edited to two 24 minute-episodes, cutting a total of 11 minutes from the original version.</note>

In 2009, eight years after "Karl & Co", a second spin-off "Karl III" was announced. Now filmed on larger sets rather than in a studio, and without a studio audience, the series was universally panned by both critics and viewers, eventually being cancelled after just twelve episodes.

== Episodes ==
A total of 142 episodes were made between 1993 and 1997, spanning eight series.

=== Home media ===
During the series' lifetime there were sporadic releases of select episodes on VHS, including two compilation tapes released in 1995 and 1996, and a commemorative compilation tape in 2000. The 1995 and 2000 tapes were later included in the DVD box sets, while the 1996 video (marking the 100th episode of the series) remains out-of-print and is a highly sought out collectible.

Following public demand, the first five series were released on DVD in 2007, with the last three series being released the following year. These have since gone out of print as TV2 later lost the rights to the first three series. As such, the DVD boxes have become collector's items and the episodes have become popular on file sharing sites due to their limited availability. Series four through eight are also available online through TV2s online platform. In August 2018, a complete DVD collection box which contains all episodes on 16 discs, was released due to series 25th years celebration. It was distributed on Norwegian market by Star Media Entertainment and TV2.

During an archive clean-up at TV2, the master tapes for the first three series were seemingly thrown out, a mistake not discovered until later when repeat broadcasts were being prepared. Luckily, it was discovered that series creator Tore Ryen had a complete set of episodes on VHS tapes, which were then restored, making it possible to air repeats once again. In 2018, Nils Vogt revealed that the tapes had been rediscovered – having been mislabelled and stored away elsewhere – and as such the 2018 box set contained higher quality versions of the episodes compared to the 2007–08 versions.
