= Siw Anita Andersen =

Norwegian actress and comedian

Siw Anita Andersen (born 27 April 1966) is a Norwegian actress and comedian, from Oslo. She is probably best known to Norwegian viewers through her role as "Målfrid" in the TV sitcom Mot i brøstet. In addition to this she has also acted in other TV-shows such as "Nissene på låven" (2001), as well as movie roles. She had her big screen debut in 1989 with the movie Showbiz, and later also had a role in The Polar Bear King (1991). Andersen has also done stand-up and variety shows, and in 2002 won the Leif Juster honorary award, named after legendary Norwegian comedian Leif Juster. In 2002 she was also awarded Komiprisen ("The Comedy Prize") as best female comedian. She has had several roles in plays at Oslo Nye Teater.
