= Braathens fleet =

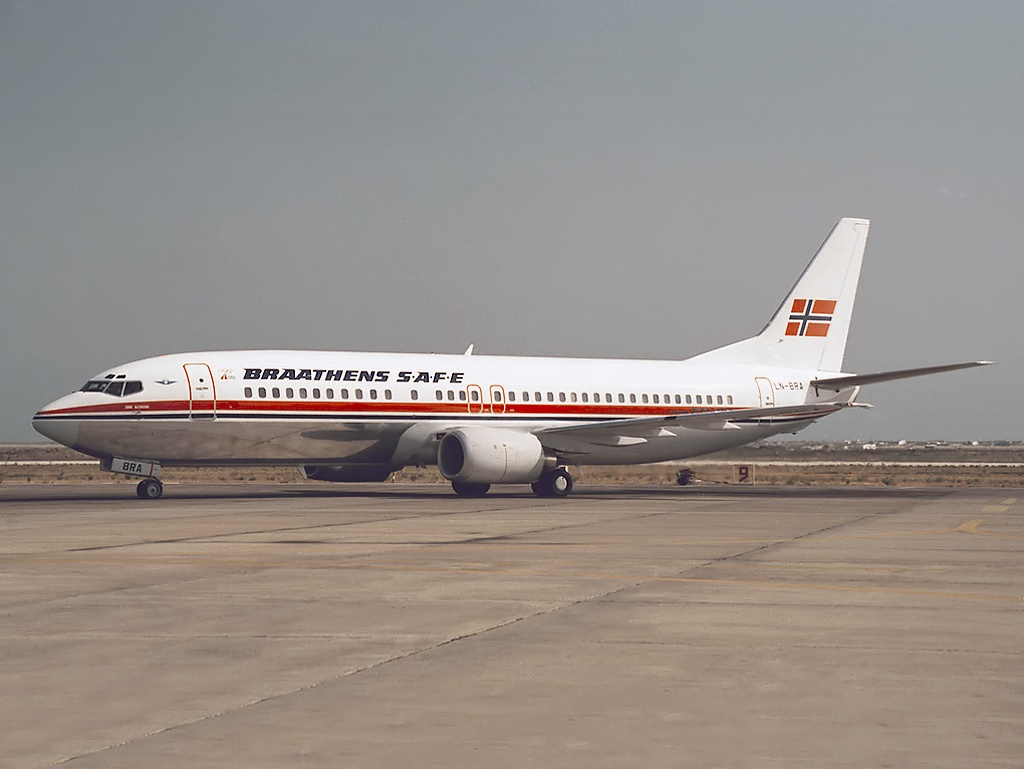
A Boeing 737-400 at Faro Airport in 1989, the year it entered into service with Braathens

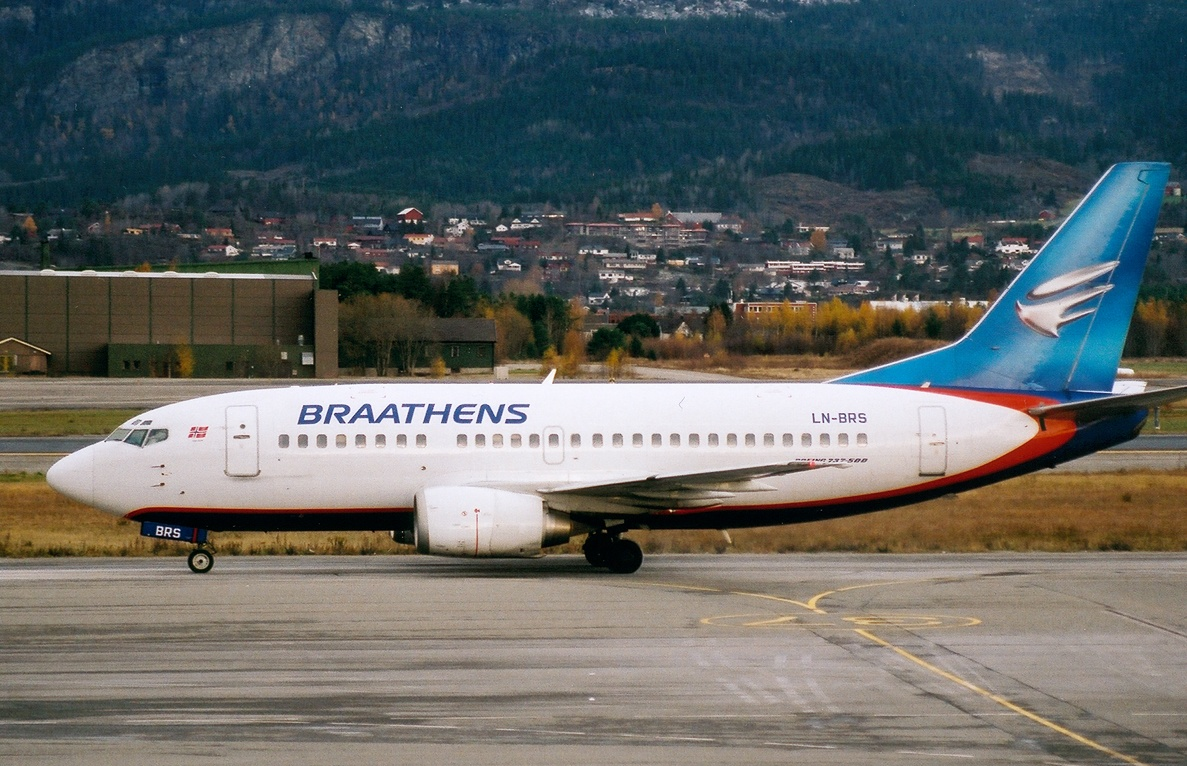
A Boeing 737-500 in the intermediate livery at Trondheim Airport, Værnes in 2002

Braathens, until 1998 known as Braathens SAFE, was a Norwegian scheduled and charter airline which operated between 1946 and 2004. The airline had 118 aircraft of 15 types, consisting of three or more models each from Douglas, Fokker and Boeing, as well as the de Havilland Heron and British Aerospace 146. The Boeing 737-200, with 20, was the most bought type. Braathens operated five variants of the 737, totaling 64 aircraft. Two aircraft were involved in hull-loss accidents.

== History ==
The airline was founded by shipowner Ludvig G. Braathen and initially flew to destinations in Asia. The original fleet consisted of Douglas aircraft; these were first used for long-haul flights, but were gradually shifted for use in medium- and short-haul charter services. The airline started domestic services in 1954, with all its scheduled routes flown domestically until 1987. However, it continued to fly charter services from both Norway and Sweden, mostly to the Mediterranean. For Norwegian routes, Braathens first used a fleet of Herons, which were replaced with the Fokker F27 from 1958. The airline became the launch customer of the Fokker F28 in 1969 and also took delivery of Boeing 737-200 aircraft. The jet aircraft were at first used for charter, but later also for domestic services. All later deliveries would consist of Boeing aircraft, and after 1977 Braathens operated only jets. Between 1986 and 1989 the airline operated only the 737-200. By 1994, they had all been replaced with 737-400 and -500. Braathens entered the Swedish internal market in 1997 by purchasing Transwede and Malmö Aviation. This gave the airline a wider range of aircraft, including the 737-700, Fokker 100 and BAe 146. The losses suffered under a price war with Scandinavian Airlines (SAS) and Color Air in 1998 and 1999 caused the airline to be taken over by the SAS Group in 2001. Braathens and SAS Norway merged to form SAS Braathens in 2004.

== Livery ==
From their establishment, Braathens SAFE's aircraft livery had a thick red and thinner white and blue cheatline, and the Flag of Norway on the vertical stabilizer. With only slight modifications, this general design was continued to and including the 737-400 and -500 aircraft. From 1997, Braathens SAFE took the new brand name of Braathens, and changed its corporate identity and livery, using a stylized grey wing as its logo. This resulted in a new livery with a blue belly, no cheatline and a blue vertical stabilizer with the stylized wing. The livery was introduced on the 737-700 and subsequently older aircraft were repainted. The design was changed again in 1999, when the logo on the vertical stabilizers was replaced with the Flag of Norway. Only some of the Douglas aircraft were named, and those that were, were called "Norse" followed by a description, such as Norse Commander and Norse Skyfarer. The Heron aircraft were given common Norwegian male names: Per, Ola, Pål and Lars. From the three last F27s, Braathens started naming their aircraft for kings of Norway. From the delivery of the F28s and 737s, all aircraft were thus named. Once aircraft were retired, the names were often reused on new aircraft.

== Fleet ==
The following is a list of aircraft operated by Braathens between its inception in 1946 until the merger with SAS in 2004. The list excludes aircraft which were owned, but never operated by, Braathens, and aircraft which were never delivered, even though they were allocated registrations. The former consists of a Cessna 206 Super Skywagon which was owned by Braathens SAFE, but operated by Bjørumfly between 1964 and 1966. The latter consists of a Douglas DC-6 which was never delivered in 1964. The list consists of the total number of aircraft operated by the airline (although the peak number operated may be lower), the year the type was first introduced, the year the last aircraft was taken out of service, and a description of the aircraft's use.

Aircraft type	No.	From	Retired	Notes
Douglas DC-4	6	1947	1966	Used military versions of the Douglas DC-4, the C-54 were bought for charter services to the Far East and South America. The services were grounded in 1952 and the fleet was reduced to no more than two aircraft. One was wet leased to Loftleiðir and operated on transatlantic flights via Iceland. They were occasionally used on domestic flights, and from 1959, also for Mediterranean charters.
Douglas C-47 Skytrain/Dakota	2	1947	1964	Military surplus C-47s, converted for civilian use and equivalent to the Douglas DC-3, were bought for short-haul charter, mostly within Europe. They were occasionally used on Norwegian domestic flights from the 1950s, before being replaced with the F27.
De Havilland Heron	7	1952	1960	The aircraft were bought to allow Braathens SAFE to start internal services, with their small size allowing Braathens to serve regional airports. One aircraft crashed in the 1956 Hummelfjell Accident. The Herons were replaced with the Friendships because increased traffic required larger aircraft.
Fokker F27-100 Friendship	8	1958	1977	Braathens was the second airline to take delivery of the airliner, and allowed the DC-3s and Herons to be retired. The Friendships were put into the main domestic routes, and by 1960, all Norwegian flights were being flown using F27s. They were replaced with F28 aircraft on busier internal routes, although some of the smallest routes continued to be flown with F27s operated by Busy Bee.
Douglas DC-6A	1	1961	1965	A single aircraft was bought to allow higher-pax Mediterranean charter flights. Unlike the B-series, it had a cargo door, which was not needed for charter flights, and the aircraft was sold parallel with Braathens buying five DC-6B in 1965 and 1966.
Douglas DC-6B	7	1962	1973	The aircraft were bought for Braathens' charter services, mostly to the Mediterranean. All were bought used, most of them from Transair. The type was also occasionally used for domestic flights, more regularly from 1967. All but one of the aircraft were phased out from 1969 to 1971 with the delivery of jet aircraft. The last aircraft remained for flights to Svalbard Airport.
Fokker F28-1000 Fellowship	6	1969	1986	After choosing not to order the 737-100, Braathens became the launch customer of the F28, which replaced the F27 on most Norwegian routes. One aircraft crashed in Flight 239 at Asker in 1972. The remaining four aircraft were gradually moved to the Norwegian routes with the fewest passengers. The aircraft were sold along with the 767 to create a unified fleet.
Boeing 737-200	20	1969	1994	Braathens was the second customer of the -200 series and the third customer of the 737. The aircraft were originally ordered for the main charter routes, but they gradually took over most of the domestic work. The last six aircraft were delivered in 1986, after which for three years Braathens only operated the single model. They were phased out between 1990 and 1994.
Boeing 767-200	2	1984	1986	The aircraft were bought for both internal scheduled and international charter use. The aircraft were too large for the domestic scheduled services, but did not have a dense enough seat configuration to make it economic for charter flights. Unprofitable, the aircraft were sold after two years.
Boeing 737-400	7	1989	2004	The aircraft were originally intended to be used for charter flights, but Braathens decided to replace all its aircraft with 737 Classics. The -400 remained primarily a charter aircraft, although it was used in some scheduled services. The aircraft were transferred to SAS Braathens.
Boeing 737-500	17	1990	2004	Boeing developed the -500 with the same capacity as the -200 after requests from airlines including Braathens. The aircraft were delivered between 1990 and 1994, allowing the -200s to be retired. Along with the -400s, Braathens could establish a unified fleet with the same type rating. The -500 served as the main workhorse in scheduled service and were transferred to SAS Braathens.
Fokker 100	5	1997	1999	The aircraft were inherited through the take-over of Transwede. They were used for internal services in Sweden, but sold after Braathens terminated its Swedish operations.
Boeing 737-300	1	1997	1999	The single aircraft was inherited through the take-over of Transwede and used for domestic routes in Sweden. Originally Braathens planned to replace all its Transwede-aircraft with 737-300, but the plans fell short. The aircraft was sold in 1999 after the closure of the services in Sweden.
Boeing 737-700	13	1998	2004	Braathens expanded its fleet with the -700 ahead of the opening of Oslo Airport, Gardermoen, which allowed the airline to increase its routes considerably. The aircraft were transferred to SAS Braathens.
British Aerospace BAe 146-200	10	1998	2001	The aircraft were inherited through the take-over of Transwede and Malmö Aviation, and allowed the airline to operate at the short runways at Stockholm-Bromma Airport and London City Airport. The aircraft were sold in the 2001 spin-off of Malmö Aviation.
