= Knut Lystad =

Norwegian comedian and actor (born 1946)

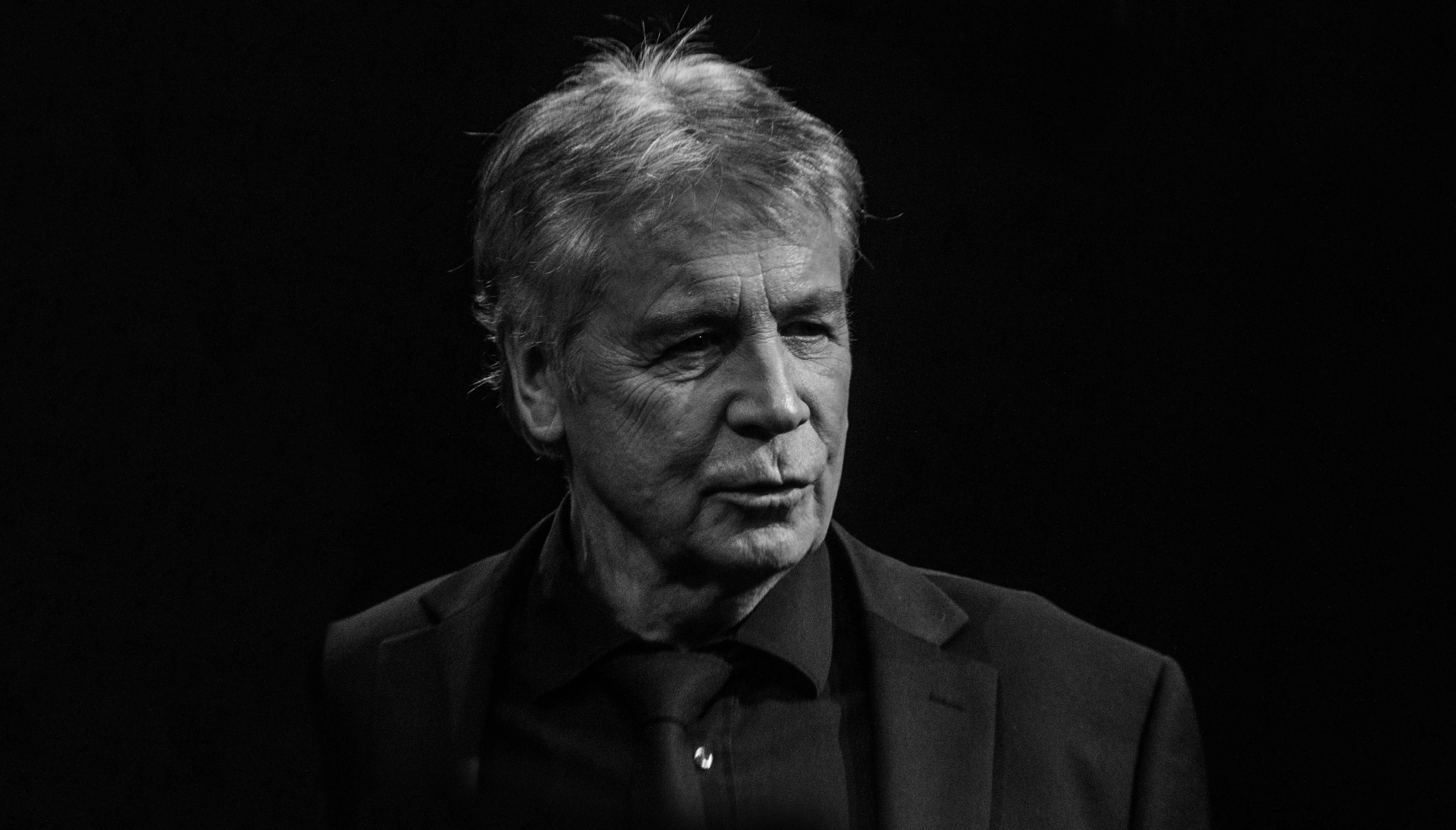
Lystad in 2016

Knut Ove Lystad (born 31 January 1946) is a Norwegian comedian, actor and writer, best known from the comedy trio KLM, alongside Trond Kirkvaag and Lars Mjøen, and from the sitcom Karl & Co.

== Career ==
Lystad and Mjøen first met in 1973, when NRK held a gathering to find new comedians for radio and television. They began working together on radio with Bedre sent enn alvor (Better late than serious), inspired by British comedy groups such as Monty Python and The Goodies and by American comedians such as Bill Cosby and Woody Allen. Their other radio series included Bare et lite øreblikk. In 1976, they joined Kirkvaag, who was already a well-known comedian in Norway, on television for the satirical news program Nynytt (Newnews). The trio became known as KLM, from the initials of their surnames. Lystad and Mjøen continued to make radio shows together until 1991.

Later KLM television shows included Press (1979), Kliin kokos (1981), Fjærsynet (1983), I spøkelyset (1983), Diplomatix (1985), SKAI-TV (1988), KLMs Nachspiel (1992) and KLMs Vorspiel (1995).

In 1985, KLM made the comic vampire film Noe helt annet (Something completely different), about Buffalo Bull, a boy who finds out that he is a vampire but keeps wishing he were something completely different. It was less successful than the trio's television series. KLM made four series of Brødrene Dal, about three explorer brothers (Gaus (Mjøen), Roms (Lystad) and Brumund Dal (Kirkvaag)) and their absurd adventures. The first series was shown in 1979 and the last in 2005, and a 1997 stage show with the brothers was released as a feature film in 2010. KLM received the Leonard Statuette in 2001 and the honorary award at the Komiprisen in 2007.

Apart from Brødrene Dal, KLM was rarely seen on NRK after 1995. In 1998, Lystad was cast as Ulf Rasch Ludvigsen in the TV2 sitcom Karl & Co, a spin-off of Mot i brøstet, which ran until 2001. In 2007 he returned to NRK with the sitcom Luftens helter (Heroes of the Sky), which he wrote from an idea by Kirkvaag, playing Captain Odd Grenland alongside Kirkvaag and Jon Skolmen. Kirkvaag died on 16 November 2007, the day before the last episode was broadcast.

On stage, Lystad co-wrote and acted in the musical Alexander (1986), and played Admiral Boom and the bank chairman in a 2015 production of Mary Poppins.

Lystad has released a number of albums of sketches and music, including three children's albums with Marianne Mørk, two with KLM and eight with Mjøen. With Torstein Ellingsen and Rune Semundseth he wrote Rosinen i pølsa (2005), a book about 333 everyday Norwegian words and expressions, which was republished as Språkquiz in 2008.
