= List of Mot i brøstet episodes =

The following is a list of episodes of the Norwegian situation comedy Mot i brøstet. The series consisted of 141 episodes which were first broadcast between January 22, 1993 and December 8, 1997.

Season	Episodes	Originally released	
Season	Episodes	First released	Last released
1	13	1993	1993
2	10	1994	1994
3	14	1994	1995
4	15	1995	1995
5	26	1995	1996
6	25	1996	1996
7	25	1997	1997
8	13	1997	1997

== Season 1 (1993) ==
No. overall	No. in season	Title	Original release date
1	1	"Forfremmelsen"	22 January 1993
Karl and Nils lose their jobs, and Karl's wife leaves him. Henry arrives and saves the day, and the three bachelors move in together.
2	2	"På ære og samvittighet"	29 January 1993
Karl plots a revenge on his former boss, with a little help from Henry.
3	3	"Kryss på linjen"	5 February 1993
Henry starts giving medical advice by telephone, while Karl meets Målfrid for the first time.
4	4	"Formål ekteskap"	12 February 1993
The guys start a dating agency, which leads to Karl having to dress up as a woman.
5	5	"Uventet besøk"	19 February 1993
Henry gets a visit from his grandchild from America.
6	6	"Opp i røyk"	26 February 1993
Karl tries to quit smoking when his doctor tells him that his blood pressure is too high. Meanwhile, there's a break-in in the house.
7	7	"Hokus pokus"	5 March 1993
Henry learns how to hypnotize, with unforeseen consequences.
8	8	"Mødrevisitten"	12 March 1993
Karl gets a visit from his former mother-in-law, while a sick Nils gets a visit from his mother Elna.
9	9	"Veldedighetskonserten"	19 March 1993
The guys arrange a charity concert to save their neighbor from eviction.
10	10	"Vokt Dem for hunden"	26 March 1993
Nils agrees to take care of the neighbor's dog for the weekend, but doesn't know that Karl is afraid of dogs.
11	11	"Fjols til fjells"	2 April 1993
Karl borrows a cabin from Nils' uncle, but gets some unexpected company.
12	12	"I en sal på hospitalet"	9 April 1993
Henry is admitted to the hospital, and Karl is jealous of Målfrid's patients.
13	13	"Kanalkrigen"	16 April 1993
The guys start their own TV channel.

== Season 2 (1994) ==
No. overall	No. in season	Title	Original release date
14	1	"Forviklinger"	6 September 1993
Henry teaches Nils how to dance, and the gang dresses up for a neighbor's costume party.
15	2	"Kjære velgere"	13 September 1993
Henry and Karl engage in local politics in the neighborhood.
16	3	"Boksedilla"	20 September 1993
Nils trains to be a boxer.
17	4	"Aldri fred å få"	27 September 1993
Karl starts a home office.
18	5	"Kunstens vei er tornefull"	4 October 1993
Henry takes painting lessons, while Nils is offered a role in a TV commercial.
19	6	"Det er ingen spøk"	11 October 1993
Henry writes for the local paper, while Karl works as a used-car salesman.
20	7	"Fingernemme karer"	18 October 1993
Elna has a new boyfriend.
21	8	"Eksotiske forhold"	25 October 1993
Målfrid puts on a lingerie show in the guys' house.
22	9	"På helsa løs"	1 November 1993
Karl decides that the guys should start eating healthy and exercise.
23	10	"Over skyene er himmelen alltid blå (Part 1)"	8 November 1993
Karl's afraid of flying and Nils is asked to be the toastmaster at his aunt's birthday party.

== Season 3 (1994/95) ==
No. overall	No. in season	Title	Original release date
24	1	"Over skyene er himmelen alltid blå (Part 2)"	15 November 1993
Karl and Målfrid travel by plane, while Nils practices to be a toastmaster.
25	2	"Til arbeid og fest"	22 November 1993
Karl starts working as a consultant, and Nils watches a neighbor's dog.
26	3	"I lyst og nød"	29 November 1993
Karl is asked to spice up the local newspaper and Nils is obsessed about phone sex.
27	4	"Bare se, ikke røre"	6 December 1993
Karl loves his new car, but the others don't share his enthusiasm.
28	5	"Vi gratulerer"	13 December 1993
The guys put on a birthday party for Nils.
29	6	"Nå er det jul igjen (Part 1)"	23 December 1993
The guys look forward to celebrating Christmas. Then they find out Elna is coming.
30	7	"Nå er det jul igjen (Part 2)"	24 December 1993
After some minor trouble the gang can finally celebrate Christmas.
31	8	"Og takk for det gamle"	3 January 1994
It's New Year's day, and the guys look back on old memories.
32	9	"Grønn var min barndoms dal"	28 March 1994
Nils thinks Henry is psychic when he guesses the lottery numbers.
33	10	"Klampen i bånn"	4 April 1994
Nils is hired as a delivery boy and Karl has to teach him how to drive.
34	11	"La meg være ung"	11 April 1994
Henry is in love with a younger woman.
35	12	"Knute på tråden"	18 April 1994
Henry has peptic ulcer, and Målfrid suspects Karl has a mistresss.
36	13	"Reklamens makt"	25 April 1994
Karl is hired to help out a firm, while Nils is fooled into buying a book series.
37	14	"Årets navn"	2 May 1994
Karl gets big-headed and makes Henry and Nils his servants.

== Season 4 (1995) ==
No. overall	No. in season	Title	Original release date
38	1	"I juice og dus"	9 May 1994
Karl gets obsessed about vegetables, and Nils is nervous about going to a female doctor.
39	2	"Tull, fjoll og rock 'n roll"	16 May 1994
The guys enter an Elvis look-alike contest.
40	3	"Slit og sleng"	23 May 1994
Karl suffers whiplash injury and seemingly loses his memory.
41	4	"Bare rolig"	29 August 1994
Karl has problems with his blood pressure.
42	5	"Meget mistenkelig"	5 September 1994
Karl and Nils suspect that Henry is a thief.
43	6	"Fullt hus og stormende jubel (Part 1)"	12 September 1994
Målfrid moves in with the guys.
44	7	"Fullt hus og stormende jubel (Part 2)"	19 September 1994
Elna is not happy about Målfrid moving in with Karl.
45	8	"Jo mere vi er sammen"	26 September 1994
Karl and Målfrid start arguing and Nils gets drunk.
46	9	"Den aller siste speider"	3 October 1994
Henry is afraid of going to the dentist, and Karl and Nils go camping.
47	10	"Luft under vingene"	10 October 1994
Nils wants to go parachuting.
48	11	"Skaff deg en hobby"	17 October 1994
Karl tells Nils to get a hobby, and Nils becomes a magician.
49	12	"Bare rot"	24 October 1994
Karl hires a cleaning maid.
50	13	"Med hotpants og kink i nakken"	31 October 1994
Nils has neck pains and Henry has back pains. Karl is concerned about Målfrid's shopping.
51	14	"Lett har det aldri vært"	7 November 1994
Nils solves crossword puzzles and Karl takes the night train.
52	15	"Man er i fare hvor man går (Part 1)"	14 November 1994
Nils tries making a funny home video with Karl, and Henry gets beaten and mugged on the street.

== Season 5 (1995/96) ==
No. overall	No. in season	Title	Original release date
53	1	"Man er i fare hvor man går (Part 2)"	21 November 1994
Henry joins a mysterious gang called "Hevnens engler" (Avenging angels or Angels of Vengeance).
54	2	"Kjendis for en dag"	28 November 1994
Nils goes on a date with a TV star and is bothered by journalists.
55	3	"Romantikk i luften"	2 January 1995
Nils prepares for his first date with Trine.
56	4	"Kjærleik med någo attåt (Part 1)"	9 January 1995
Nils takes Trine home to meet the gang and gets a job at the local supermarket.
57	5	"Kjærleik med någo attåt (Part 2)"	16 January 1995
Nils goes to dinner with Trine and her parents.
58	6	"Ubudne gjester"	23 January 1995
Nils' aunt Olga comes to visit.
59	7	"Sterkt savnet"	30 January 1995
The gang starts cleaning the house.
60	8	"God bedring"	13 February 1995
Henry and Nils get sick.
61	9	"Bill. mrk."	20 February 1995
Henry and Nils search for a secretary for Karl.
62	10	"Ingen høyere?"	27 February 1995
Karl and Målfrid go to a family cabin, while Nils and Henry are trying to sell Henry's old furniture.
63	11	"Overnattingsgjesten"	6 March 1995
An old girlfriend of Målfrid is sleeping over.
64	12	"Utdrikkingslaget"	13 March 1995
Målfrid and Trine put on a bachelorette party for one of Målfrid's colleagues.
65	13	"For en god sak"	20 March 1995
Karl's father comes to visit and starts flirting with Målfrid and Trine.
66	14	"Høyt spill"	27 March 1995
Henry starts playing video games.
67	15	"Knall og fall"	3 April 1995
Henry falls on ice and has to go to the hospital.
68	16	"Sol ute, sol inne"	10 April 1995
Nils and Trine plan on going to a sunny island while Karl and Målfrid go on a skiing trip.
69	17	"Trange tider"	17 April 1995
Målfrid is concerned about her weight and Nils starts taking vitamins.
70	18	"Gode naboer"	28 August 1995
The guys are at war with their neighbor when he refuses to give back their lawnmover.
71	19	"Siste stikk"	4 September 1995
Karl is stung by a wasp and is afraid of getting seriously ill.
72	20	"Sol i hjertet"	11 September 1995
Karl goes to a seminar to learn how to stay positive. At home the gang puts on a birthday party for Elna.
73	21	"Det vil helst gå bra"	18 September 1995
Nils is obsessed about the TV series Baywatch, much to Trine's dismay.
74	22	"En stjerne er født (Part 1)"	25 September 1995
Nils wants to become a ventriloquist.
75	23	"En stjerne er født (Part 2)"	2 October 1995
Nils joins Trine's choir.
76	1	"Radiofantomet"	16 October 1995
Nils participates in a radio contest and shows off his impressive knowledge of pop music.
77	25	"For mye av det gode"	23 October 1995
Henry feels lonely when Nils, Trine, Karl and Målfrid go on double dates, so he decides to join a marriage agency.
78	26	"Du tror det ikke før du får ser det"	30 October 1995
Nils gets a watch dog and Målfrid starts feeling old.
79	27	"Ikke bare flaks"	6 November 1995
Målfrid starts working long shifts at the hospital, while Karl has problems with his new neighbor.

== Season 6 (1996) ==
No. overall	No. in season	Title	Original release date
80	1	"På stedet hvil (Part 1)"	13 November 1995
Nils writes party songs, while Karl has to go to a military refresher course. Trine tells Nils she's pregnant.
81	2	"På stedet hvil (Part 2)"	20 November 1995
Nils is excited about becoming a father, while Karl struggles on his refresher course. Trine's not pregnant after all.
82	3	"I glass og ramme"	27 November 1995
Nils wants to put a picture of Elna on the wall, but Karl won't let him. Karl is shocked when he finds out there's mice in the house.
83	4	"Babyer i alle aldre"	22 January 1996
Nils and Trine are babysitting.
84	5	"Nyttige innkjøp"	29 January 1996
Nils, Trine and Henry watch TV Shop and start a shopping frenzy.
85	6	"Vaffelekspressen"	5 February 1996
Nils and Trine start a take-away business with waffles.
86	7	"Røverkjøp"	12 February 1996
Karl tries to sell his car, while Nils and Trine go to a sale.
87	8	"Legevisitten"	19 February 1996
Karl gets jealous of one of Målfrid's patients at the hospital and decides to go undercover.
88	9	"Loppemarkedet"	26 February 1996
The gang decides to donate to the local flea market, but Karl has trouble getting rid of old memories.
89	10	"Festforestillingen"	4 March 1996
The neighborhood plans to put on a variety show, and Karl agrees to be the show instructor.
90	11	"Festforestillingen (Part 2)"	11 March 1996
Karl is taking his role as show instructor very seriously.
91	12	"Med armen i bind"	18 March 1996
Elna falls and breaks her arm, so she has to stay in the gang's house while recovering.
92	13	"På glattisen"	25 March 1996
Nils has to get a driver's certificate or he will lose his job. Then he finds out his driving instructor has hit on Målfrid and Trine.
93	14	"Fornemt besøk"	15 April 1996
Målfrid's aunt Erna comes to visit, and Nils becomes a waiter.
94	15	"I lovens navn"	22 April 1996
Karl is involved in a money scam and gets anxious. Nils and Trine find some homeless kittens.
95	16	"Et sant mareritt"	29 April 1996
Elna is scared after seeing a moose outside the house and refuses to leave.
96	17	"Dobbeltgjengeren"	6 May 1996
Karl gets big-headed when people start telling him he looks like Michael Douglas.
97	18	"Alarmen går"	13 May 1996
Karl installs an alarm in the house, but no one remembers the code.
98	19	"Bare krøll"	26 August 1996
Målfrid wants to get a new haircut.
99	20	"I gråsonen"	2 September 1996
Karl starts feeling old when he finds out he needs reading glasses.
100	21	"Mot i Brøstet i 100"	9 September 1996
In the 100th episode of the series, the gang goes to the Tivoli in Copenhagen to celebrate Henry's 75th birthday.
101	22	"Full kontroll"	16 September 1996
Karl is fed up with Nils and Henry taking advantage of him.
102	23	"Mine damer og herrer"	23 September 1996
Karl accepts to make a speech for a local association when he finds out that it will be broadcast on TV.
103	24	"Slående argumenter"	30 September 1996
Karl starts taking self-defence classes.

== Season 7 (1997) ==
No. overall	No. in season	Title	Original release date
104	1	"I søteste laget"	7 October 1996
Nils is admitted to the hospital after eating too much candy.
105	2	"Kunsten å slappe av"	14 October 1996
Karl has bought cruise tickets for himself and Målfrid, but later trades them for golf clubs.
106	3	"En skrue løs"	21 October 1996
Elna teaches Nils how to fix his car, while Karl and Målfrid go shopping.
107	4	"I kjempeform"	28 October 1996
Elna is feeling out of shape, so Målfrid takes her to an aerobics class.
108	5	"I kampens hete"	4 November 1996
Nils goes crazy while watching a soccer game on TV, and causes a mad Karl to break the TV.
109	6	"Uheldige bivirkninger"	11 November 1996
Nils is star-struck after meeting a celebrity at the supermarket, and Karl becomes a hypochondriac.
110	7	"Ille plaget"	18 November 1996
Karl is irritated about benefit organizations asking him to donate money, while Henry loses his voice and Nils turns deaf.
111	8	"O'jul med din glede"	23 December 1996
Karl is fed up with Christmas shopping and tries to convince the gang to make the presents themselves.
112	9	"Det er mer mellom himmel og jord"	3 February 1997
Trine and Nils enter a car lottery.
113	10	"Påtrengende slektninger"	10 February 1997
Målfrid's aunt and her family come to visit, much to Karl's annoyance.
114	11	"På sparebluss"	17 February 1997
Karl freaks out over the electric bill and takes drastic measures.
115	12	"I vranglås"	24 February 1997
Henry goes to the cabin with his girlfriend, and Elna's not happy about that.
116	13	"Kjære tante Harriet"	3 March 1997
Karl answers people's questions in the local newspaper, using the pseudonyme "Aunt Harriet"
117	14	"Når enden er god"	10 March 1997
Trine is convinced that Nils has an affair with the new manager of the supermarket.
118	15	"Høye bølger (Part 1)"	17 March 1997
Karl invites the whole gang on a cruise trip, but Trine has to go to France for a half year to work as an au pair.
119	16	"Høye bølger (Part 2)"	17 March 1997
The gang goes on a Caribbean cruise, while Trine goes to France.
120	17	"I all hemmelighet"	31 March 1997
Karl is convinced that he's a victim of industrial espionage, while Henry drinks in secrecy.
121	18	"Rett mann på rett sted"	7 April 1997
Karl is expecting a visit from a business associate while Henry is expecting a social worker. Then a mix-up happens.
122	19	"En sunn sjel i et sunt legeme"	14 April 1997
Karl gets obsessed about a new health product and starts throwing out all the food.
123	20	"Tanken er god"	21 April 1997
Karl freaks out over a bill from the carpenter, while Nils is depressed about not hearing from Trine.
124	21	"Noen som passer for deg"	28 April 1997
Elna has put in a personal ad for Nils in order to find a new girlfriend for him.
125	22	"Under åpen himmel"	5 May 1997
Karl is invited on a mountain trip and practices camping outside the house.
126	23	"Den store eldretreffen"	12 May 1997
Henry is in love and spends lots of money on buying gifts to his girlfriend. But it's not his own money.

== Season 8 (1997) ==
No. overall	No. in season	Title	Original release date
127	1	"I fyr og flamme"	25 August 1997
The gang decides to have a barbecue.
128	2	"Det er tanken som teller"	1 September 1997
Karl and Målfrid celebrate their fifth anniversary.
129	3	"Arbeidskonflikten"	8 September 1997
Nils has worked at the supermarket for many years, but suddenly he's fired.
130	4	"Slagerparaden (Part 1)"	15 September 1997
Nils is the lead singer for the band that's gonna play at the 25th anniversary party for the supermarket.
131	5	"Slagerparaden (Part 2)"	22 September 1997
The band rehearses for the party with Henry on drums, and Nils is joined by a second lead singer.
132	6	"I full strekk"	6 October 1997
Nils breaks a leg while skateboarding and is treated by a sexy nurse.
133	7	"Bare møll"	13 October 1997
The gang is bothered by moth in their house.
134	8	"Med søkke og snøre"	20 October 1997
Karl has to get the kitchen tap fixed, while Nils and Henry go on a fishing trip.
135	9	"Full krise (Part 1)"	27 October 1997
Henry has pneumonia and is taken to the hospital, while Karl is mistaken for someone else and treated like a king.
136	10	"Full krise (Part 2)"	3 November 1997
Trine comes home from France with a changed personality and wardrobe, much to Nils' dismay.
137	11	"Mitt navn er Bond - Nils Bond"	10 November 1997
There's a break-in in the house and Nils decides to investigate it himself.
138	12	"Dakars liten"	17 November 1997
Henry comes home from the hospital and the girls take care of him, but he just wants to be left alone.
139	13	"Ikke noe problem"	24 November 1997
Karl receives bad news about his tax arrears, while Trine has some good news to tell Nils.
140	14	"Og alle levde lykkelig... (Part 1)"	1 December 1997
Nils and Trine are expecting children, but Nils is afraid to tell Elna.
141	15	"Og alle levde lykkelig... (Part 2)"	8 December 1997
Henry and Elna get married and move to Spain, while Målfrid considers moving to Africa.

==Season 1 (1993)==

No. overall	No. in season	Title	Original release date
1	1	"Forfremmelsen"	22 January 1993
Karl and Nils lose their jobs, and Karl's wife leaves him. Henry arrives and saves the day, and the three bachelors move in together.
2	2	"På ære og samvittighet"	29 January 1993
Karl plots a revenge on his former boss, with a little help from Henry.
3	3	"Kryss på linjen"	5 February 1993
Henry starts giving medical advice by telephone, while Karl meets Målfrid for the first time.
4	4	"Formål ekteskap"	12 February 1993
The guys start a dating agency, which leads to Karl having to dress up as a woman.
5	5	"Uventet besøk"	19 February 1993
Henry gets a visit from his grandchild from America.
6	6	"Opp i røyk"	26 February 1993
Karl tries to quit smoking when his doctor tells him that his blood pressure is too high. Meanwhile, there's a break-in in the house.
7	7	"Hokus pokus"	5 March 1993
Henry learns how to hypnotize, with unforeseen consequences.
8	8	"Mødrevisitten"	12 March 1993
Karl gets a visit from his former mother-in-law, while a sick Nils gets a visit from his mother Elna.
9	9	"Veldedighetskonserten"	19 March 1993
The guys arrange a charity concert to save their neighbor from eviction.
10	10	"Vokt Dem for hunden"	26 March 1993
Nils agrees to take care of the neighbor's dog for the weekend, but doesn't know that Karl is afraid of dogs.
11	11	"Fjols til fjells"	2 April 1993
Karl borrows a cabin from Nils' uncle, but gets some unexpected company.
12	12	"I en sal på hospitalet"	9 April 1993
Henry is admitted to the hospital, and Karl is jealous of Målfrid's patients.
13	13	"Kanalkrigen"	16 April 1993
The guys start their own TV channel.

== Season 2 (1994) ==
No. overall	No. in season	Title	Original release date
14	1	"Forviklinger"	6 September 1993
Henry teaches Nils how to dance, and the gang dresses up for a neighbor's costume party.
15	2	"Kjære velgere"	13 September 1993
Henry and Karl engage in local politics in the neighborhood.
16	3	"Boksedilla"	20 September 1993
Nils trains to be a boxer.
17	4	"Aldri fred å få"	27 September 1993
Karl starts a home office.
18	5	"Kunstens vei er tornefull"	4 October 1993
Henry takes painting lessons, while Nils is offered a role in a TV commercial.
19	6	"Det er ingen spøk"	11 October 1993
Henry writes for the local paper, while Karl works as a used-car salesman.
20	7	"Fingernemme karer"	18 October 1993
Elna has a new boyfriend.
21	8	"Eksotiske forhold"	25 October 1993
Målfrid puts on a lingerie show in the guys' house.
22	9	"På helsa løs"	1 November 1993
Karl decides that the guys should start eating healthy and exercise.
23	10	"Over skyene er himmelen alltid blå (Part 1)"	8 November 1993
Karl's afraid of flying and Nils is asked to be the toastmaster at his aunt's birthday party.

== Season 3 (1994/95) ==
No. overall	No. in season	Title	Original release date
24	1	"Over skyene er himmelen alltid blå (Part 2)"	15 November 1993
Karl and Målfrid travel by plane, while Nils practices to be a toastmaster.
25	2	"Til arbeid og fest"	22 November 1993
Karl starts working as a consultant, and Nils watches a neighbor's dog.
26	3	"I lyst og nød"	29 November 1993
Karl is asked to spice up the local newspaper and Nils is obsessed about phone sex.
27	4	"Bare se, ikke røre"	6 December 1993
Karl loves his new car, but the others don't share his enthusiasm.
28	5	"Vi gratulerer"	13 December 1993
The guys put on a birthday party for Nils.
29	6	"Nå er det jul igjen (Part 1)"	23 December 1993
The guys look forward to celebrating Christmas. Then they find out Elna is coming.
30	7	"Nå er det jul igjen (Part 2)"	24 December 1993
After some minor trouble the gang can finally celebrate Christmas.
31	8	"Og takk for det gamle"	3 January 1994
It's New Year's day, and the guys look back on old memories.
32	9	"Grønn var min barndoms dal"	28 March 1994
Nils thinks Henry is psychic when he guesses the lottery numbers.
33	10	"Klampen i bånn"	4 April 1994
Nils is hired as a delivery boy and Karl has to teach him how to drive.
34	11	"La meg være ung"	11 April 1994
Henry is in love with a younger woman.
35	12	"Knute på tråden"	18 April 1994
Henry has peptic ulcer, and Målfrid suspects Karl has a mistresss.
36	13	"Reklamens makt"	25 April 1994
Karl is hired to help out a firm, while Nils is fooled into buying a book series.
37	14	"Årets navn"	2 May 1994
Karl gets big-headed and makes Henry and Nils his servants.

== Season 4 (1995) ==
No. overall	No. in season	Title	Original release date
38	1	"I juice og dus"	9 May 1994
Karl gets obsessed about vegetables, and Nils is nervous about going to a female doctor.
39	2	"Tull, fjoll og rock 'n roll"	16 May 1994
The guys enter an Elvis look-alike contest.
40	3	"Slit og sleng"	23 May 1994
Karl suffers whiplash injury and seemingly loses his memory.
41	4	"Bare rolig"	29 August 1994
Karl has problems with his blood pressure.
42	5	"Meget mistenkelig"	5 September 1994
Karl and Nils suspect that Henry is a thief.
43	6	"Fullt hus og stormende jubel (Part 1)"	12 September 1994
Målfrid moves in with the guys.
44	7	"Fullt hus og stormende jubel (Part 2)"	19 September 1994
Elna is not happy about Målfrid moving in with Karl.
45	8	"Jo mere vi er sammen"	26 September 1994
Karl and Målfrid start arguing and Nils gets drunk.
46	9	"Den aller siste speider"	3 October 1994
Henry is afraid of going to the dentist, and Karl and Nils go camping.
47	10	"Luft under vingene"	10 October 1994
Nils wants to go parachuting.
48	11	"Skaff deg en hobby"	17 October 1994
Karl tells Nils to get a hobby, and Nils becomes a magician.
49	12	"Bare rot"	24 October 1994
Karl hires a cleaning maid.
50	13	"Med hotpants og kink i nakken"	31 October 1994
Nils has neck pains and Henry has back pains. Karl is concerned about Målfrid's shopping.
51	14	"Lett har det aldri vært"	7 November 1994
Nils solves crossword puzzles and Karl takes the night train.
52	15	"Man er i fare hvor man går (Part 1)"	14 November 1994
Nils tries making a funny home video with Karl, and Henry gets beaten and mugged on the street.

== Season 5 (1995/96) ==
No. overall	No. in season	Title	Original release date
53	1	"Man er i fare hvor man går (Part 2)"	21 November 1994
Henry joins a mysterious gang called "Hevnens engler" (Avenging angels or Angels of Vengeance).
54	2	"Kjendis for en dag"	28 November 1994
Nils goes on a date with a TV star and is bothered by journalists.
55	3	"Romantikk i luften"	2 January 1995
Nils prepares for his first date with Trine.
56	4	"Kjærleik med någo attåt (Part 1)"	9 January 1995
Nils takes Trine home to meet the gang and gets a job at the local supermarket.
57	5	"Kjærleik med någo attåt (Part 2)"	16 January 1995
Nils goes to dinner with Trine and her parents.
58	6	"Ubudne gjester"	23 January 1995
Nils' aunt Olga comes to visit.
59	7	"Sterkt savnet"	30 January 1995
The gang starts cleaning the house.
60	8	"God bedring"	13 February 1995
Henry and Nils get sick.
61	9	"Bill. mrk."	20 February 1995
Henry and Nils search for a secretary for Karl.
62	10	"Ingen høyere?"	27 February 1995
Karl and Målfrid go to a family cabin, while Nils and Henry are trying to sell Henry's old furniture.
63	11	"Overnattingsgjesten"	6 March 1995
An old girlfriend of Målfrid is sleeping over.
64	12	"Utdrikkingslaget"	13 March 1995
Målfrid and Trine put on a bachelorette party for one of Målfrid's colleagues.
65	13	"For en god sak"	20 March 1995
Karl's father comes to visit and starts flirting with Målfrid and Trine.
66	14	"Høyt spill"	27 March 1995
Henry starts playing video games.
67	15	"Knall og fall"	3 April 1995
Henry falls on ice and has to go to the hospital.
68	16	"Sol ute, sol inne"	10 April 1995
Nils and Trine plan on going to a sunny island while Karl and Målfrid go on a skiing trip.
69	17	"Trange tider"	17 April 1995
Målfrid is concerned about her weight and Nils starts taking vitamins.
70	18	"Gode naboer"	28 August 1995
The guys are at war with their neighbor when he refuses to give back their lawnmover.
71	19	"Siste stikk"	4 September 1995
Karl is stung by a wasp and is afraid of getting seriously ill.
72	20	"Sol i hjertet"	11 September 1995
Karl goes to a seminar to learn how to stay positive. At home the gang puts on a birthday party for Elna.
73	21	"Det vil helst gå bra"	18 September 1995
Nils is obsessed about the TV series Baywatch, much to Trine's dismay.
74	22	"En stjerne er født (Part 1)"	25 September 1995
Nils wants to become a ventriloquist.
75	23	"En stjerne er født (Part 2)"	2 October 1995
Nils joins Trine's choir.
76	1	"Radiofantomet"	16 October 1995
Nils participates in a radio contest and shows off his impressive knowledge of pop music.
77	25	"For mye av det gode"	23 October 1995
Henry feels lonely when Nils, Trine, Karl and Målfrid go on double dates, so he decides to join a marriage agency.
78	26	"Du tror det ikke før du får ser det"	30 October 1995
Nils gets a watch dog and Målfrid starts feeling old.
79	27	"Ikke bare flaks"	6 November 1995
Målfrid starts working long shifts at the hospital, while Karl has problems with his new neighbor.

== Season 6 (1996) ==
No. overall	No. in season	Title	Original release date
80	1	"På stedet hvil (Part 1)"	13 November 1995
Nils writes party songs, while Karl has to go to a military refresher course. Trine tells Nils she's pregnant.
81	2	"På stedet hvil (Part 2)"	20 November 1995
Nils is excited about becoming a father, while Karl struggles on his refresher course. Trine's not pregnant after all.
82	3	"I glass og ramme"	27 November 1995
Nils wants to put a picture of Elna on the wall, but Karl won't let him. Karl is shocked when he finds out there's mice in the house.
83	4	"Babyer i alle aldre"	22 January 1996
Nils and Trine are babysitting.
84	5	"Nyttige innkjøp"	29 January 1996
Nils, Trine and Henry watch TV Shop and start a shopping frenzy.
85	6	"Vaffelekspressen"	5 February 1996
Nils and Trine start a take-away business with waffles.
86	7	"Røverkjøp"	12 February 1996
Karl tries to sell his car, while Nils and Trine go to a sale.
87	8	"Legevisitten"	19 February 1996
Karl gets jealous of one of Målfrid's patients at the hospital and decides to go undercover.
88	9	"Loppemarkedet"	26 February 1996
The gang decides to donate to the local flea market, but Karl has trouble getting rid of old memories.
89	10	"Festforestillingen"	4 March 1996
The neighborhood plans to put on a variety show, and Karl agrees to be the show instructor.
90	11	"Festforestillingen (Part 2)"	11 March 1996
Karl is taking his role as show instructor very seriously.
91	12	"Med armen i bind"	18 March 1996
Elna falls and breaks her arm, so she has to stay in the gang's house while recovering.
92	13	"På glattisen"	25 March 1996
Nils has to get a driver's certificate or he will lose his job. Then he finds out his driving instructor has hit on Målfrid and Trine.
93	14	"Fornemt besøk"	15 April 1996
Målfrid's aunt Erna comes to visit, and Nils becomes a waiter.
94	15	"I lovens navn"	22 April 1996
Karl is involved in a money scam and gets anxious. Nils and Trine find some homeless kittens.
95	16	"Et sant mareritt"	29 April 1996
Elna is scared after seeing a moose outside the house and refuses to leave.
96	17	"Dobbeltgjengeren"	6 May 1996
Karl gets big-headed when people start telling him he looks like Michael Douglas.
97	18	"Alarmen går"	13 May 1996
Karl installs an alarm in the house, but no one remembers the code.
98	19	"Bare krøll"	26 August 1996
Målfrid wants to get a new haircut.
99	20	"I gråsonen"	2 September 1996
Karl starts feeling old when he finds out he needs reading glasses.
100	21	"Mot i Brøstet i 100"	9 September 1996
In the 100th episode of the series, the gang goes to the Tivoli in Copenhagen to celebrate Henry's 75th birthday.
101	22	"Full kontroll"	16 September 1996
Karl is fed up with Nils and Henry taking advantage of him.
102	23	"Mine damer og herrer"	23 September 1996
Karl accepts to make a speech for a local association when he finds out that it will be broadcast on TV.
103	24	"Slående argumenter"	30 September 1996
Karl starts taking self-defence classes.

== Season 7 (1997) ==
No. overall	No. in season	Title	Original release date
104	1	"I søteste laget"	7 October 1996
Nils is admitted to the hospital after eating too much candy.
105	2	"Kunsten å slappe av"	14 October 1996
Karl has bought cruise tickets for himself and Målfrid, but later trades them for golf clubs.
106	3	"En skrue løs"	21 October 1996
Elna teaches Nils how to fix his car, while Karl and Målfrid go shopping.
107	4	"I kjempeform"	28 October 1996
Elna is feeling out of shape, so Målfrid takes her to an aerobics class.
108	5	"I kampens hete"	4 November 1996
Nils goes crazy while watching a soccer game on TV, and causes a mad Karl to break the TV.
109	6	"Uheldige bivirkninger"	11 November 1996
Nils is star-struck after meeting a celebrity at the supermarket, and Karl becomes a hypochondriac.
110	7	"Ille plaget"	18 November 1996
Karl is irritated about benefit organizations asking him to donate money, while Henry loses his voice and Nils turns deaf.
111	8	"O'jul med din glede"	23 December 1996
Karl is fed up with Christmas shopping and tries to convince the gang to make the presents themselves.
112	9	"Det er mer mellom himmel og jord"	3 February 1997
Trine and Nils enter a car lottery.
113	10	"Påtrengende slektninger"	10 February 1997
Målfrid's aunt and her family come to visit, much to Karl's annoyance.
114	11	"På sparebluss"	17 February 1997
Karl freaks out over the electric bill and takes drastic measures.
115	12	"I vranglås"	24 February 1997
Henry goes to the cabin with his girlfriend, and Elna's not happy about that.
116	13	"Kjære tante Harriet"	3 March 1997
Karl answers people's questions in the local newspaper, using the pseudonyme "Aunt Harriet"
117	14	"Når enden er god"	10 March 1997
Trine is convinced that Nils has an affair with the new manager of the supermarket.
118	15	"Høye bølger (Part 1)"	17 March 1997
Karl invites the whole gang on a cruise trip, but Trine has to go to France for a half year to work as an au pair.
119	16	"Høye bølger (Part 2)"	17 March 1997
The gang goes on a Caribbean cruise, while Trine goes to France.
120	17	"I all hemmelighet"	31 March 1997
Karl is convinced that he's a victim of industrial espionage, while Henry drinks in secrecy.
121	18	"Rett mann på rett sted"	7 April 1997
Karl is expecting a visit from a business associate while Henry is expecting a social worker. Then a mix-up happens.
122	19	"En sunn sjel i et sunt legeme"	14 April 1997
Karl gets obsessed about a new health product and starts throwing out all the food.
123	20	"Tanken er god"	21 April 1997
Karl freaks out over a bill from the carpenter, while Nils is depressed about not hearing from Trine.
124	21	"Noen som passer for deg"	28 April 1997
Elna has put in a personal ad for Nils in order to find a new girlfriend for him.
125	22	"Under åpen himmel"	5 May 1997
Karl is invited on a mountain trip and practices camping outside the house.
126	23	"Den store eldretreffen"	12 May 1997
Henry is in love and spends lots of money on buying gifts to his girlfriend. But it's not his own money.

== Season 8 (1997) ==
No. overall	No. in season	Title	Original release date
127	1	"I fyr og flamme"	25 August 1997
The gang decides to have a barbecue.
128	2	"Det er tanken som teller"	1 September 1997
Karl and Målfrid celebrate their fifth anniversary.
129	3	"Arbeidskonflikten"	8 September 1997
Nils has worked at the supermarket for many years, but suddenly he's fired.
130	4	"Slagerparaden (Part 1)"	15 September 1997
Nils is the lead singer for the band that's gonna play at the 25th anniversary party for the supermarket.
131	5	"Slagerparaden (Part 2)"	22 September 1997
The band rehearses for the party with Henry on drums, and Nils is joined by a second lead singer.
132	6	"I full strekk"	6 October 1997
Nils breaks a leg while skateboarding and is treated by a sexy nurse.
133	7	"Bare møll"	13 October 1997
The gang is bothered by moth in their house.
134	8	"Med søkke og snøre"	20 October 1997
Karl has to get the kitchen tap fixed, while Nils and Henry go on a fishing trip.
135	9	"Full krise (Part 1)"	27 October 1997
Henry has pneumonia and is taken to the hospital, while Karl is mistaken for someone else and treated like a king.
136	10	"Full krise (Part 2)"	3 November 1997
Trine comes home from France with a changed personality and wardrobe, much to Nils' dismay.
137	11	"Mitt navn er Bond - Nils Bond"	10 November 1997
There's a break-in in the house and Nils decides to investigate it himself.
138	12	"Dakars liten"	17 November 1997
Henry comes home from the hospital and the girls take care of him, but he just wants to be left alone.
139	13	"Ikke noe problem"	24 November 1997
Karl receives bad news about his tax arrears, while Trine has some good news to tell Nils.
140	14	"Og alle levde lykkelig... (Part 1)"	1 December 1997
Nils and Trine are expecting children, but Nils is afraid to tell Elna.
141	15	"Og alle levde lykkelig... (Part 2)"	8 December 1997
Henry and Elna get married and move to Spain, while Målfrid considers moving to Africa.
