= The Monroes (Norwegian band) =

Norwegian musical duo

- Origin: Oslo, Norway
- Genres: Ska, pop
- Years active: 1982–1993, 2004–2005
- Label: EMI
- Past members: Lage Fosheim; Eivind Rølles

The Monroes were a Norwegian pop/ska duo, consisting of singer Lage Fosheim and guitarist Eivind Rølles. They recorded four successful studio albums between 1983 and 1993, before disbanding. Initially strongly influenced by English ska band Madness, their debut single "Sunday People" reached number one on the Norwegian charts in 1983. Their music rapidly evolved into a more laidback, melodious pop style, and they reached number one again with "Cheerio" in 1985, also charting in the U.S. Their 1985 album "Face Another Day" is regularly featured on critics' lists of Norway's best pop/rock albums ever.

The Monroes were noted for their strong melodies, polished musical arrangements, and Lage Fosheim's clear vocals and distinctly British-sounding accent.

Both members died of cancer in 2013.

== History ==
The Monroes were formed in 1982 by Rølles and Fosheim after having disbanded their band "Broadway News", a popular act on the club scene in Oslo in the late 70s. Fosheim and Rølles then decided to remain a duo to retain creative control. Their eponymous 1983 debut album "Sunday People" was heavily influenced by English ska act Madness, as clearly demonstrated by their debut single, "Sunday People". The album sold over 130.000 copies, earning them a platinum disc, and "Sunday People" went to number one on the VG-Lista topp 20 singles chart.

Their 1985 follow-up "Face Another Day" eschewed the ska beats for a more laid-back pop sound, and sold over 250.000 copies in Norway alone, earning them double platinum and another number one single, "Cheerio". They also gained international success and made the top 10 on the U.S. pop singles chart.

Their third studio album, "Everything's Forgiven" was released in 1987 to general acclaim and sold well, despite not matching huge success of its predecessors. Their fourth, and final album "The Long Way Home" was released in 1993 and the duo disbanded shortly thereafter. In the next ten years they held sporadic reunion concerts, but did not record any new material.

In 2004, the pop-rap duo Ravi & DJ Løv released the song "Tsjeriåu" (the name is a sort of Norwegian, phonetic representation of the English word "cheerio"), featuring the chorus from "Cheerio" with Lage Fosheim on re-recorded vocals. This brought something of a renaissance for the Monroes, who reunited for a tour of Norway and also played the festival circuit for the next year and a half. They disbanded again in 2006, still not having produced any new material.

In 2008, Rølles was diagnosed with cancer, but continued to work behind the scenes in the music industry. In 2012, Fosheim was also diagnosed with cancer. Both died during 2013, Rølles on 18 March (aged 54), and Fosheim on 19 October (aged 55).

== Members ==
- Lage Fosheim – vocals (1982–1993, 2004–2005)
- Eivind Rølles – guitars (1982–1993, 2004–2005)

== Discography ==
The Monroes discography
- Studio albums: 4
- Compilation albums: 1
- Singles: 8

=== Studio albums ===
Title	Album details	Peak chart positions	Sales
Title	Album details	NOR	Sales
Sunday People	Released: 1983; Label: Bahama Records (#BH1201); Formats; LP, CS, CD	1	NOR: 130,000
Face Another Day	Released: 1985; Label: Parlophone (#2404121); Formats; LP, CS, CD	1	NOR: 250,000
Everything's Forgiven	Released: 1987; Label: EMI (#748565); Formats; LP, CS, CD	5	
Long Way Home	Released: 1993; Label: EMI/BMG (#MON9301); Formats; CS, CD	5	
"—" denotes items that did not chart or were not released in that territory.

=== Compilation albums ===
Title	Album details	Peak chart positions
Title	Album details	NOR
Absolute Monroes	Released: 1993; Label: EVA Records (#EVA102); Formats: CS, CD	11
"—" denotes items that did not chart or were not released in that territory.

=== Singles ===
Year	Title	Peak chart positions		Album
Year	Title	NOR	SWE	Album
1983	"Sunday People"	1	—	Sunday People
1984	"On the Bus"	3	—	Non-album single
1985	"Let's Go"	—	—	Face Another Day
1985	"Cheerio"	1	11	Face Another Day
1986	"(Stay with Me) Jeanette"	—	—	Face Another Day
1987	"I Call It Love"	3	—	Everything's Forgiven
1993	"Just Another Normal Day"	2	—	Long Way Home
2005	"Tsjeriåu" (with Ravi & DJ Løv)	1	—	Non-album single
"—" denotes items that did not chart or were not released in that territory.

Awards
Preceded by Olav Stedje	Recipient of the Pop Spellemannprisen; 1983	Succeeded by Lava
