= 4 KLM =

- Village
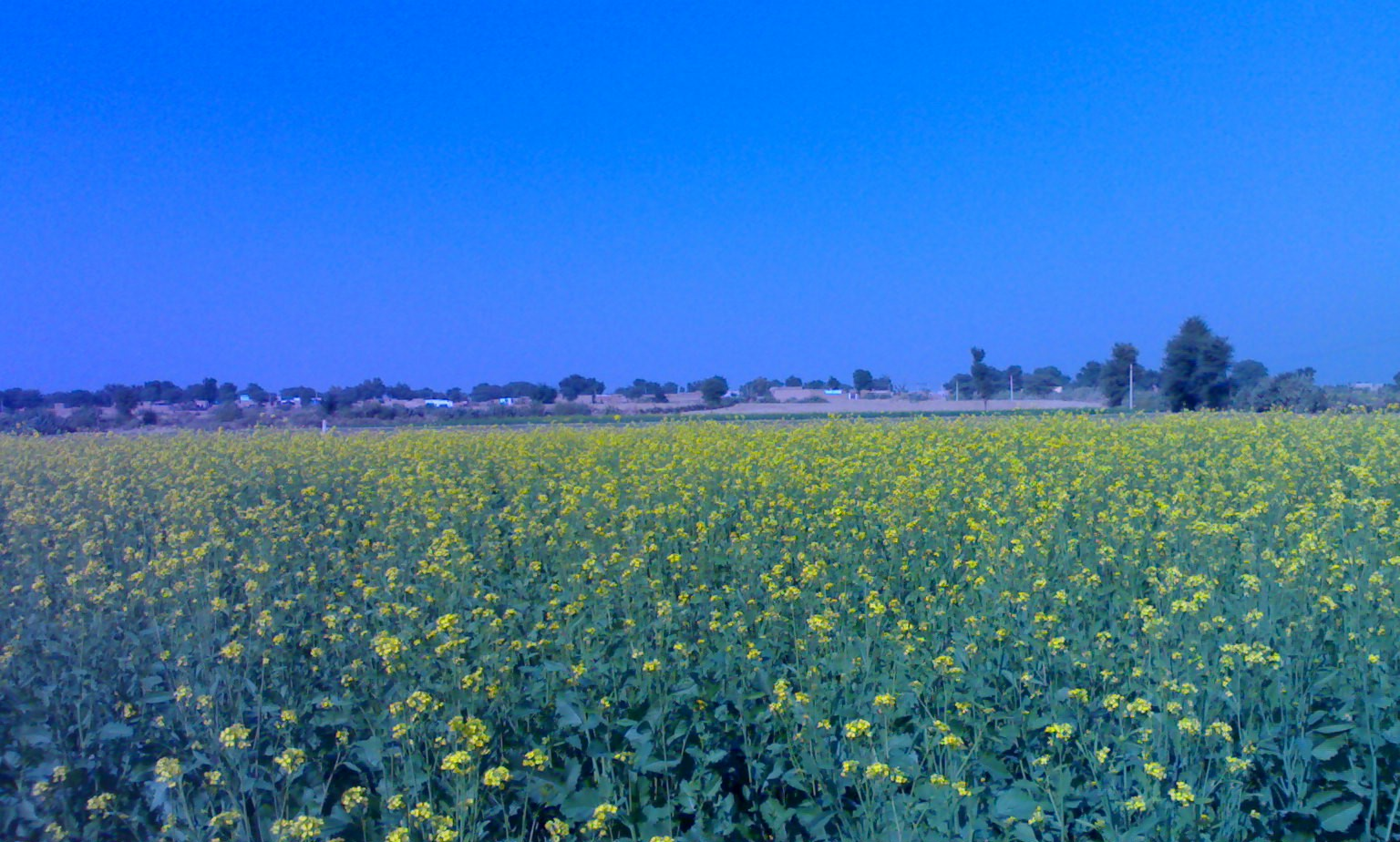
- Mustard fields in 4 KLM Village

- Location in Rajasthan, India 4 KLM (India)
- Coordinates: 28.794291°N 72.834022°E
- Country: India
- State: Rajasthan
- District: Sri Ganganagar district

Government
  - Panch: Balvinder Kaur, Santosh
- Elevation: 139 m (456 ft)

Population (2011)
  - Total: 1,037

Languages
  - Official: Hindi
- Time zone: UTC+5:30 (IST)
- Telephone code: 01506
- ISO 3166 code: RJ-IN
- Vehicle registration: RJ-13

4 KLM is a small village in Rawla Mandi tehsil of Sri Ganganagar district, Rajasthan, India. It is 186 km from district headquarters. It borders on the Bikaner district to the south. Kumhars of Hathusar village are original residents of this village. The major occupations include farming, labour and mining.
