= Rolf Kirkvaag =

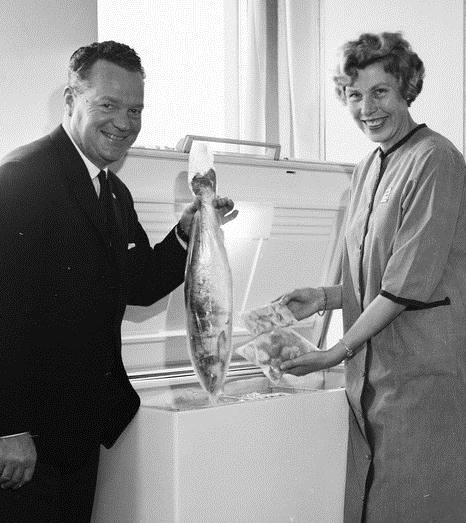
- Rolf Kirkvaag, on the left
- Born: 20 October 1920
- Died: 24 January 2003 (aged 82)
- Occupations: journalist, radio- and TV-personality
- Children: Trond Kirkvaag (son)

Rolf Kirkvaag (20 September 1920 – 24 January 2003) was a Norwegian journalist, and a radio and TV personality. He worked for NRK, the Norwegian state broadcasting network, between 1947 and 1959, and 1969 and 1990. From 1972 to 1985 he was entertainment director.

Already a popular public persona, his fame grew enormously after an incident in 1956. Kirkvaag was among the passengers on a Braathens SAFE plane that crashed by Hommelfjell, in what is known as the Hummelfjell Accident. Two people were dead and ten still alive after the crash. Kirkvaag – with a broken bone in his foot – and another passenger had to walk 18 km (11 mi) for help. The incident made Kirkvaag a national hero, and he has since been referred to as Norway's first celebrity.

Among the shows he hosted were the children's show Titten Tei and the radio quiz show 20 spørsmål (20 Questions). He was also a commentator for numerous sporting events, like the 1952 Winter Olympics. Rolf Kirkvaag's son, Trond Kirkvaag, was a well-known television comedian. Trond, who died in 2007, wrote a controversial biography of his father shortly before his own death. Here he described Rolf's darker side, and alleged that he had been an emotionally distant and occasionally violent father.
