= Nils Vogt (comedian) =

Norwegian actor (born 1948)

- Born: Nils Henning Vogt; April 29, 1948 (age 77)
- Occupations: Actor and comedian
- Spouse: Marianne Arnesen
- Children: Øyvind Vogt

Nils Henning Vogt (born April 29, 1948) is a Norwegian actor who is best known for some of his comedy roles, particularly as the temperamental small business owner Karl Reverud in the sit-coms Mot i brøstet (which he also directed) from 1993 to 1997, Karl & Co from 1998 to 2001 and Karl III in 2009. Vogt has also played in several theatrical roles, including musical comedy. Vogt started acting Arnfinn Lycke in the TV 2 soap opera Hotel Cæsar in January 2011.

== References and external links ==
- Store norske leksikon, entry on Nils Vogt. (Online)
- Nils Vogt at IMDb
