= Lage Fosheim =

- Born: 5 February 1958; Bestum, Oslo, Norway
- Origin: Norway
- Died: 19 October 2013 (aged 55)
- Genres: Ska; pop
- Occupations: Singer; songwriter; composer
- Instrument: Vocals

Lage Fosheim (5 February 1958 – 19 October 2013) was a Norwegian record promoter and musician, best known for his time in the popular pop duo the Monroes. He was the brother of the actress Minken Fosheim.

== Biography ==
The Monroes were one of the biggest Norwegian pop successes in the 1980s. "Sunday People" and "Cheerio" were number one at VG-lista for a long period of time and they are still heard on the radio, 30 years after the album was released. In 1983 The Monroes received an award for the best pop album and were named the musicians of the year during the Spellemannprisen. After retiring as a pop musician, Fosheim worked from 1995 to 2008 as promo director at Universal Music (former PolyGram). Later he worked as artist and concert coordinator, including as manager for the artist Jahn Teigen.

Fosheim was born in Bestum, Oslo. Prior to the Monroes, he was a member of the band Broadway News. He died in Nice, France.

== Discography ==
=== The Monroes ===
- Sunday People (1983)
- Face Another Day (1985)
- Everything's Forgiven (1987)
- Long Way Home (1993)
- Absolute Monroes (1993)
- Sunday People/Move in Closer (1983)
- On the Bus/Mrs. M (1984)
- Cheerio/Beating of a Lovers Heart (1985)
- Let's Go/Beating of a Lover's Heart (1985)
- (Stay with Me) Jeanette/How Strong Is Your Love (1986)
- Wish You Were Here/Lady on 5th Avenue (1986)
- I Call It Love/I'll Return to You (1987)
- Let Them Out of There/If Only You Could See Me Now (1987)
- Be Alright/Watching the Fools (1987)
- All Those Years Ago/Watching the Fools (1988)
- Just Another Normal Day (1993)
- Sun Goes Up (1993)
- Tsjeriåu (2005), med Ravi and DJ Løv
- Broadway News (1980)
- Falske fjes (1980)
- Banco (1981)
- Beste Vol. 1 (1983)
- Du og jeg inatt/Elsker deg endel (1981)
- Morgenda'n er vår/Se på meg (1981)

=== Tre Små Griser ===
- Pappa jag vill ha en italienare (1991)

=== Collaborations ===
- Diverse: Blodige strenger (1981)
- Diverse: På gang 4 (1981)
- Diverse: På gang 11 (1983)
- Beate: Like a River/Strand Hotel (1984)
- Diverse: Årets topp hits 1984 (1984)
- Beate: Like a River (1984)
- Lars Kilevold: Another Rainy Monday/Raindance (1985)
- Forente Artister: Sammen for livet (1985)
- Valentine: City of Dreams/Nothing to Fear (1985)
- Diverse: Postens sommerkassett (1985)
- Tom Mathisen & Herodes Falsk: Fusk (1986)
- Lena Philipsson: Cheerio/Det går väl an (1986)
- Flamingokvintetten: Flickan från Heidelberg (1986)
- Lena Philipsson: Dansa i neon (1987)
- Lena Philipsson: Hit-låtar med Lena Philipsson 1985–1987 (1988)
- Jahn Teigen: I skyggen av en drøm/Har du lyst på litt mer (1989)
- Jahn Teigen: Jahn Teigen (1989)
- Ketil Bjørnstad: Rift – en rockopera av Ketil Bjørnstad (1991)
- Minken Fosheim: Eventyret om Mozart (1995)
- Jahn Teigen: Hele historien 1967–1994 (1995)
- Minken Fosheim: Eventyret om Beethoven (1996)
- Dusty Cowshit: Østenfor Soon, Western for Råde (1996)
- Svein Tindberg og Rosemarie Köhn: Historien om de 10 bud (1996)
- Wenche Myhre: Vannmann (1997)
- Smurfene: Smurfehits 3 (1997)
- Lars Kilevold: Kjip Lunch – Kilevolds Greatest Hits (1997)
- Minken Fosheim: Eventyret om Grieg (1997)
- Krem: Venner (1998)
- Minken Fosheim: Eventyret om Tsjaikovskij (1999)
- Minken Fosheim: Eventyret om Vivaldi (2000)
- Diverse: Tande-P: Mine favoritter (2000)
- Minken Fosheim: Eventyret om Ole Bull (2003)
- Re-Pita: Re-Play – Re-Pita Mania 2 (2004)
- Minken Fosheim: Eventyret om Bach (2005)
- Ravi & DJ Løv: Den nye arbæidsdagn (2005)
- Diverse: McMusic Hits 2005 (2005)
- Diverse: Landeplage (2008)
- Diverse: P4 Sommerstemninger (2008)
- Diverse: Lego hits (2008)
- Diverse: P4 Julestemning (2009)
- Jahn Teigen: Jahn Teigen fra Tønsberg (2011)

== Honors ==
- 1983: This Year's Spellemann together with Eivind Rølles
- 1983: Spellemannprisen Pop Category together with Eivind Rølles
