= Lars Mjøen =

Norwegian artist (born 1945)

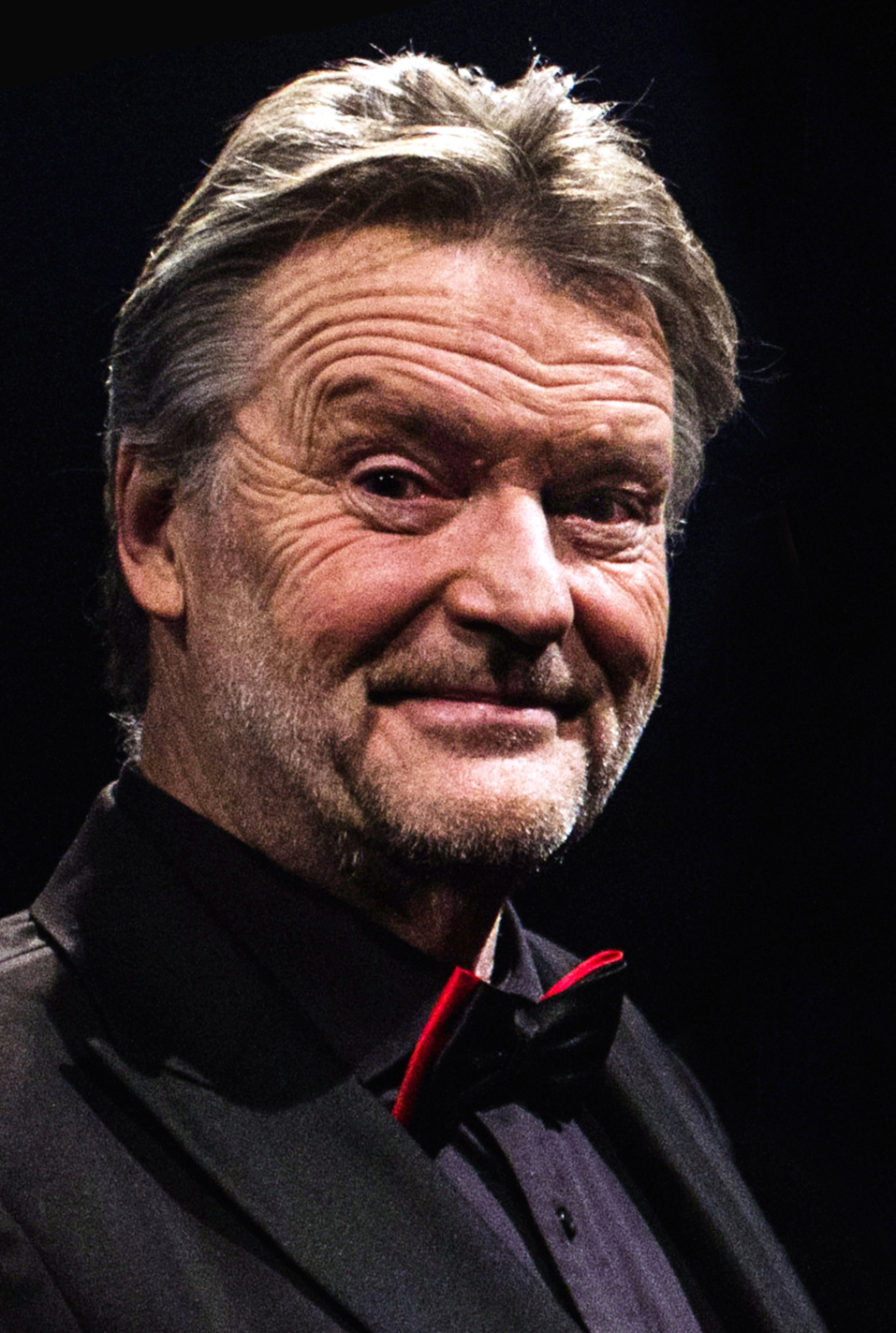
Lars Mjøen

Lars Lennart Heiberg Mjøen (born 13 November 1945) is a Norwegian comedian, actor, singer, screenwriter, director, editor and author. He is best known as a member of the comedy trio KLM, alongside Trond Kirkvaag and Knut Lystad.

== Career ==
Mjøen and Lystad began their entertainment careers with the NRK radio show “Bedre sent enn alvor” (Better late than seriously) in 1975, a program heavily influenced by Monty Python. In 1976, they moved on to television where they joined Kirkvaag who was already a well-known comedian in Norway for the satirical news program Nynytt. In a 2015 interview, Mjøen and Lystad said that due to their radio background they would often have long debates about the exact wording of their dialogue, which sometimes frustrated Kirkvaag who came from a television background and was more concerned with funny visuals than "perfect" dialogue.

KLM shows later included “Klin Kokos” (Sticky Coconuts, 1981), “MRK Fjærsynet” (MRK TeeVee, 1983), “I spøkelyset” (In the Joke Light, 1984), “Skai TV - imitert fjernsyn” (Skai ^{Ⓡ} TV — An Imitated Television (Channel), 1988), “KLMs Nachspiel” (KLM's After Play, 1992) and “KLMs Vorspiel” (KLM's Prelude, 1995).

With the exception of the Monty Python-esque “Klin Kokos”, all these shows mainly spoofed Norwegian television and current events. Typically, Lystad and Kirkvaag played the comedic roles, while Mjøen was more often cast as a host or a straight man. In 1985, KLM made their first and only feature film, “Noe helt annet” (Something completely different), scoffing Buffalo Bull (Trond Kirkvaag already derided this public figure in 1973 in the “Buffalo Bløffs internasjonale vegg-til-vegg-show”, The Buffalo Bluff Wall-to-Wall International Tour, together with Jon Skolmen, and Kirkvaag as ‘Buffalo Bløff’), a young man who must come to terms about being a vampire.

He recorded the LP “Singing in the Brain” with Lystad, and wrote the first and fourth series of “Brødrene Dal” into book form. Unlike Lystad and Kirkvaag, who have appeared separately on many other television programs, Mjøen has rarely appeared on television outside the KLM shows.

== Family ==
Mjøen was born on 13 November 1945, and is the son of actors Jon Lennart Mjøen and Else Heiberg. He is the cousin of author Gerd Brantenberg.

== See also ==
- Trond Kirkvaag
- Knut Lystad
