= Red Sand =

Desert in Saudi Arabia

Coordinates: 24.364919°N 46.366450°E

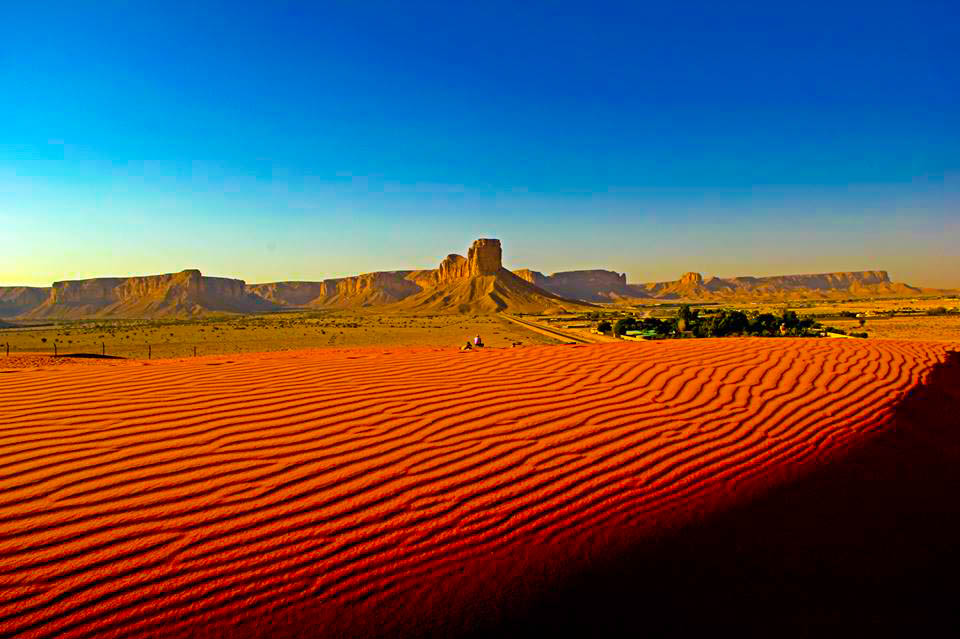
View of Red Sand

Red Sand (aka Red Sand Dunes) is an area of red desert sand dunes near Riyadh, Saudi Arabia.

The area is a popular destination among Saudis, expatriates, and Filipino workers. Organized tours and other activities are available.

== See also ==
- Geography of Saudi Arabia
- Thumamah National Park
