= Trond Kirkvaag =

Norwegian artist (1946–2007)

- Born: Trond Georg Kirkvaag; 21 June 1946; Oslo, Norway
- Died: 16 November 2007 (aged 61); Oslo, Norway
- Occupations: Comedian, actor

Trond Georg Kirkvaag (21 June 1946 – 16 November 2007) was a Norwegian comedian, actor, impressionist, screenwriter, author, director and television host. During his 39 years at the Norwegian TV network, NRK, he produced numerous comedy television series. After his death he was widely hailed by his colleagues as possibly the greatest Norwegian TV comedian in history. He was the son of NRK journalist and television host Rolf Kirkvaag.

== Life ==
Trond Kirkvaag appeared on television for the first time in 1968 in an NRK 1 program titled “Smil til det skjulte kamera” (Smile to the hidden camera), which was originally broadcast on 7 October 1967. This was the first step into a long-standing professional relationship with NRK, and Kirkvaag became a firm fixture in the national TV and radio corporation's identity.

Trond Kirkvaag was best known for his work with Knut Lystad and Lars Mjøen as part of the comedy trio KLM, which was inspired by such diverse influences as the absurd humour of Monty Python; the nonsensical, wordy Blackadder; Not the Nine O'Clock News; the childlike mime-esque Mr. Bean, made famous by Rowan Atkinson; and even the slapstick of the silent movie era and the quick-fire wise-cracking of the Marx Brothers.

Kirkvaag and his fellow comedians won the Gullrute (Golden Pane) television award in 2004. The award is given by fellow members of the acting profession, and is an indication of how well-respected he was among his colleagues.

KLM won another Gullrute in 2007; however, only Lystad and Mjøen were able to receive the award, as Kirkvaag was too ill to attend. Lystad paid an emotional tribute to his long-time friend during his acceptance speech.

== Career ==
He began working at NRK in 1968. One of his first successes was “Buffalo Bløffs internasjonale vegg-til-vegg-show” (The Buffalo Bluff Wall-to-Wall International Tour) in 1973, made with partner Jon Skolmen. It won the Chaplin Award in Montreux.

In 1976, he and Skolmen won the Golden Rose of Montreux, the Chaplin Award and the Press Award in Montreux for “The Nor-way to Broadcasting”, a humorous program about the history of broadcasting in Norway. He began his collaboration with Lystad and Mjøen in 1976 with the satirical news program, Nynytt (Newnews).

In 1979, KLM wrote and starred in the first of four series about Brødrene Dal (The Dal Brothers), which continued to be produced until 2005. KLM also created a live show, Brødrene Dal - Vikingsverdets forbannelse (The Brothers Dal - Curse of the Viking Sword) in 1997 and released an LP album featuring songs from the show. A fifth series of “Brødrene Dal” was planned, but abandoned after Kirkvaag's death.

Other programs included MRK Fjærsynet (MRK TeeVee) - an ironic play on NRK's title, with the acronym being an abbreviation of “Morsk Rikskringkasting” (Hard and Fast National Broadcasting Corporation). Fjærsyn is a colloquial pronunciation of “fjernsyn” (TV), Skai TV - imitert fjernsyn” (Skai ^{Ⓡ} TV An Imitated Television (Channel); 1988), KLMs Nachspiel (KLM's After Play; 1992) and “KLMs Vorspiel” (KLM's Prelude), the Montreux live contributions, “Diplomatix” (1985), and The Rise and Fall of an Olympic Village (1994), as well as the film Noe Helt Annet (Something Completely Different).

In 1996, Kirkvaag created the program Trotto Libre on NRK 1's Alltid Moro (Always Fun), with fellow comedian Otto Jespersen. After the collaboration with Jespersen ended, he starred in a skit series “Showtalk”, with short satirical sketches on a NRK talk show.

== Death ==
On 16 November 2007, Trond Kirkvaag died aged 61 of colorectal cancer. He was cremated on 30 November.

His final TV appearance was on “Luftens Helter”, which he co-wrote with Knut Lystad. The final episode was aired the day after his death.

== Bibliography ==
Kirkvaag wrote two books: the crime novel “Kongen” (The King), and the autobiography “Kom ikke nærmere. Jeg og far” (Come no closer. Me and Dad), in which he described what it was like growing up in the 1950s in Majorstuen (a part of the Frogner borough in Oslo), in the shadow of his father, the most famous Norwegian TV entertainer of his time, then nicknamed Sjonkel Rolf by the children who watched his shows.

In Come no closer, Kirkvaag describes his father as being a kind of Dr. Jekyll and Mr. Hyde, both at home and at work, prone to severely punishing his children when they broke his rules, sometimes beating them, although their sister was always spared from such harsh treatment. Kirkvaag wrote that he and his brother were so frightened they used to call him "the stranger".

Kirkvaag's uncle, Tor Kirkvaag (born 1929; Rolf Kirkvaag Sr's younger brother) denied these and other allegations. Trond Kirkvaag's younger brother Rolf Jr. (born 1948) was as adamant as his uncle; he firmly denied the things his brother wrote; however, he admitted that same day that he and his elder brother had been mistreated by their father. Trond claimed that he tried to reconcile his differences with his father before he died in 2003, without success.

== See also ==
- Knut Lystad
- Lars Mjøen, both members of the KLM trio
