= Aerocon Boa Type S =

Boa Type S

Overview
- Manufacturer: Aerocon California Inc.
- Production: 1978–1979

Body and chassis
- Class: Sports car
- Body style: 2-door coupe
- Layout: M/R
- Platform: Custom aluminum monocoque

Powertrain
- Transmission: 4-speed manual

Dimensions
- Wheelbase: 101 in (2,565 mm)
- Length: 178.5 in (4,534 mm)
- Width: 66 in (1,676 mm)
- Height: 47.5 in (1,206 mm)
- Curb weight: 1,800 lb (816 kg)

The Boa Type S is a sports car built by Aerocon California Inc. in the United States from 1978 to 1979. The car features a lightweight aluminum chassis and was sold without an engine. Fifteen examples were built before production ended.

== David Saunders ==
David A. Saunders was both designer and builder of the Boa Type S. Saunders was born in the United Kingdom (UK) and apprenticed at de Havilland, where he worked on a variety of their aircraft, including the de Havilland Comet.

In 1955 Saunders emigrated to Canada, where he was hired by Avro Canada and worked on the Avro Arrow project. He left Avro in 1958, before the Arrow's cancellation, and in 1959 joined the Royal Canadian Air Force (RCAF). Saunders left the RCAF in 1962 and established the Cheetah Light Aircraft Company (Clairco) to manufacture an all-wood four passenger aircraft called the Cheetah, superseded in 1964 by the all-metal Super Cheetah. In 1965 he established aeronautical design and manufacturing company Canadian Aerocon in Montréal.

In 1968 Saunders was made president of the newly formed Saunders Aircraft Company, also in Montréal. This company re-engineered the de Havilland Heron for extra passenger space and short takeoff and landings by extending the fuselage, revising the wings, and replacing the Heron's piston engines with a pair of Pratt & Whitney PT-6A turboprops to create the Saunders ST-27 and, later, the ST-28. In a deal with the Manitoba Development Corporation (MDC) that brought new funding to the company, Saunders Aircraft moved to an airfield at Gimli, Manitoba that had been recently vacated by the Canadian military. Saunders himself was unhappy with the deal with the Manitoba government and the move to Gimli, and by April 1971 had left the company.

After this Saunders immigrated to the US. He incorporated Aerocon California on 25 October 1974. The company offered aeronautical design consultancy services.

== History ==
The Boa Type S was built at Aerocon's facility in Ventura, California.

Development of the car occurred over a three-and-a-half-year period, and progressed through four prototypes.

The emblem for the Boa Type S was a stylized letter "S" with the upper arc ending in a snake's head with its jaws open and tongue extended.

The Boa Type S was to retail for $17,000 without engine, and $18,500 with engine. All cars were sold fully assembled but without engines to save Aerocon from having to certify the car's emissions compliance. A 12-month/12,000-mile factory warranty came with each car.

Aerocon had secured an order for twenty cars from a distributor, and were making plans to move into a new 20,000 square feet (1,900 m^{2}) production facility. Saunders hoped to ramp production up to between four hundred and six hundred cars per year, and was considering opening multiple production sites to meet future demand.

Production ran for two years; 1978 and 1979. Fifteen cars were built.

== Features ==
Reflecting the designer's aircraft engineering background, the Boa Type S is built with a riveted aluminum monocoque chassis. The structure is composed of front and rear torsion boxes and a center section made up of the sills, backbone tunnel, and floor. A steel roll cage is attached to the chassis. The bodywork is of fiberglass and is unstressed.

The car's front suspension is essentially the same as that of the Triumph Spitfire, using Alford & Alder components. The steering column is also sourced from the Triumph. The rear suspension is based on trailing arms fabricated by Aerocon, with Girling coil springs over telescopic shock absorbers.

The braking system is a combination of Spitfire front discs and VW rear drums. Adapter plates on the front hubs match the front bolt pattern to the rear.

On the interior, the seats are Stylex Huntmaster items, and instrumentation is from Stewart-Warner.

Other parts come from a variety of sources. The windscreen and windshield wipers are from the Ford Pinto, the door latches from Chevrolet, and the bumper hydraulic dampers from the Honda Civic.

The car's roof has a removable panel above each seat, making it a T-top. In the roof's flying buttresses behind the B-pillar are bubbled, louvered inserts rather than glass. One reference also reports that the windshield frame and entire roof structure can be unbolted and removed.

The engine recommended by the factory is a version of the four cylinder boxer engine used in the Volkswagen Type 4, the Porsche 914, the Volkswagen T3 Transporter, and the Porsche 912E. This air-cooled engine has a flat (vertical axis) fan and a single cam-in-block driving two valves per cylinder through pushrods and rocker arms. Promotional material from Aerocon highlights the later, US specification, 1.8 L (110 cu in) model fitted with Bosch L-Jetronic fuel injection.

The engine compartment is said to have been large enough to mount a flat six cylinder Porsche engine.

Estimates of the car's performance included a 0–60 mph (0–97 km/h) time of 8.5 seconds, and fuel economy of 30 mpg_{‑US} (7.8 L/100 km) Contemporary reviews found the car's quality of fit and finish acceptable or better. Reactions to the car's styling were mixed.

== Technical data ==
Aerocon Boa Type S:
	Detail:
Engine:	Mid-mounted four cylinder boxer engine
Displacement:	1,795 cc (109.5 cu in)
Bore × Stroke:	93 mm × 66 mm (3.66 in × 2.60 in)
Maximum power:	72 hp (53.7 kW) at 5000 rpm
Maximum torque:	99 ft⋅lb (134.2 N⋅m) at 3500 rpm
Compression ratio:	7.3:1
Valvetrain:	Single cam-in-block, pushrods, 2 overhead valves per cylinder
Induction:	Naturally aspirated, Bosch electronic fuel injection
Cooling:	Air cooled
Transmission:	4-speed manual transaxle
Steering:	Rack and pinion, 3.5 turns lock-to-lock
Brakes f/r:	Disc/drum
Suspension front:	Upper and lower A-arms, coil springs over telescopic shock absorbers, anti-roll bar
Suspension rear:	Trailing arms, coil springs, telescopic shock absorbers, anti-roll bar
Body/Chassis:	Aluminum monocoque chassis with fiberglass body
Track f/r:	53.25 / 54 in (1,353 / 1,372 mm)
Weight distribution % f/r:	47/53
Wheelbase:	101 in (2,565 mm)
Fuel capacity:	16 US gal (60.6 L; 13.3 imp gal)
Wheels:	14×5.5 inches
Tires f/r:	DR 70×14
Length; Width; Height:	178.5 in (4,534 mm); 66 in (1,676 mm); 47.5 in (1,206 mm)
Weight:	1,800 lb (816.5 kg)
