= ACES Colombia =

Colombian airline, 1972–2003

Coordinates: 43°26′34″N 6°04′09″W

ACES (Aerolíneas Centrales de Colombia)
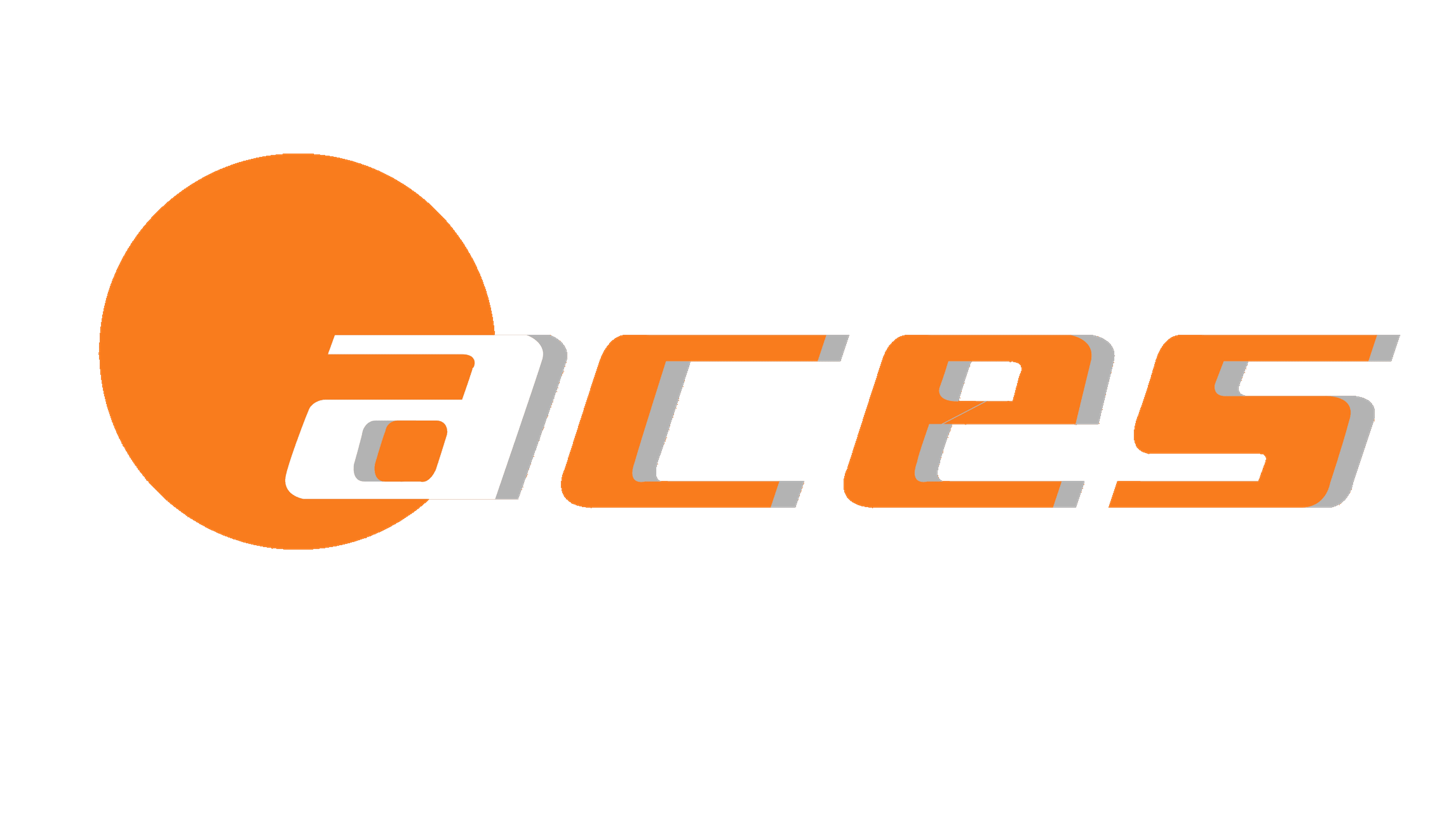

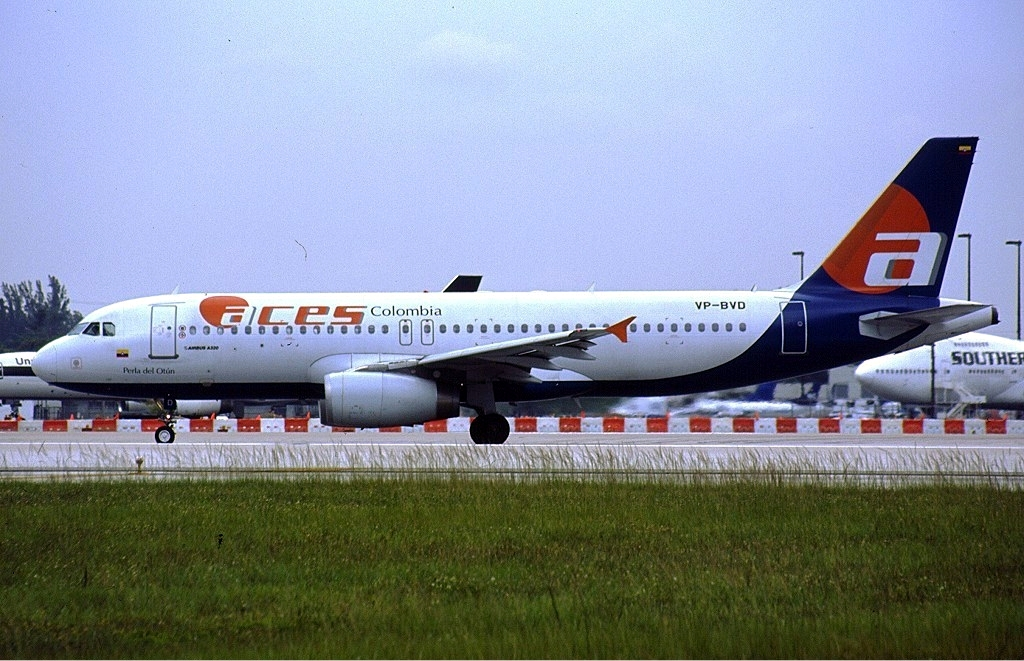
- Airbus A320
IATA	ICAO	Call sign
VX	AES	ACES
- Founded: August 30, 1971
- Commenced operations: February 22, 1972
- Ceased operations: August 20, 2003
- Hubs: Medellín-JMC; Medellín-Olaya Herrera
- Secondary hubs: Bogotá; Pereira
- Frequent-flyer program: Premium Pass
- Alliance: Alianza Summa
- Fleet size: 16
- Destinations: 43
- Headquarters: Torre del Café, Medellín, Colombia
- Founder: Luis H. Coulson
- Website: aces.com.co

ACES (Spanish acronym: Aerolíneas Centrales de Colombia) was an airline with its headquarters in the Torre del Café in Medellín, Colombia and founded on August 30, 1971, by a group of 13 Colombian entrepreneurs, amongst them, most notably Orlando Botero Escobar and German Peñaloza Arias from Manizales and Luis H. Coulson, Jorge Coulson R., Alberto Jaramillo and Hernán Zuluaga from Medellín.

== History ==
Mr. Botero and Mr. Peñaloza, who were considered pioneers in the early days of Colombian commercial aviation, had tried several times to establish a commuter service between Manizales and Bogotá. They managed to operate a small commuter airline by the name TARCA (acronym of Taxi Aéreo de Caldas), which was forced to shut down due to financial difficulties. With the support and capital of the new partners from Medellín, they embarked on the successful enterprise that would be ACES. The airline began service on February 22, 1972, with Saunders ST-27 aircraft for the routes Medellín-Bogotá and Manizales-Bogotá, and soon became a major player in the Colombian market. By 1976, the airline had expanded its network to smaller regional destinations, for which it purchased DHC-6 Twin Otter aircraft.

In 1981, ACES acquired its first Boeing 727-100 jet. In 1986, an expansion began with the acquisition of more 727-100 and the arrival of Fairchild FH-227 aircraft built under license by Fairchild in the United States and with slight modifications. The 727s had a capacity of 129 passengers and the Fairchilds of 44. At this time the first international charter flights also began to Havana, Varadero, Nassau, Freeport, Montego Bay, Puerto Plata, Punta Cana, St. Kitts, St. Maarten, Porlamar and Cancún.

In 1991, ACES completely replaced its Fairchild F-27 fleet with ATR 42 turbo-prop aircraft for its short-haul regional routes, and its Boeing 727-100 with the Boeing 727-200 Advanced variant. In 1992, ACES expanded its service internationally, operating flights from Medellín and Bogotá to Miami. Soon after, Juan Emilio Posada was appointed CEO and would serve until the airline's demise in 2003. In late 1997, ACES modernized its fleet acquiring brand-new Airbus A320-200 aircraft that replaced its Boeing 727s. It expanded its routes to Fort Lauderdale, Quito, Caracas, Cancún (served by charters), Santo Domingo, Punta Cana and San Juan, Puerto Rico; as well as additional domestic flights within Colombia.

ACES created a corporate culture of service and punctuality that would earn it the recognition and loyalty of its customers, resulting in consistent increases in its market share and revenues in the domestic market, which was dominated for decades by Avianca. It was named the "Best airline in Colombia" by several industry and consumer publications.

On May 20, 2002, ACES merged with major competitor Avianca and SAM to form the Alianza Summa, a strategic alliance aimed at joining forces to counteract the adverse circumstances that faced the airline industry in Colombia and the world after the September 11 attacks. ACES' operations were halted on August 20, 2003, after the board decided to liquidate the airline. By November 2003, Alianza Summa was dissolved and Avianca took over ACES' routes.

== Fleet ==
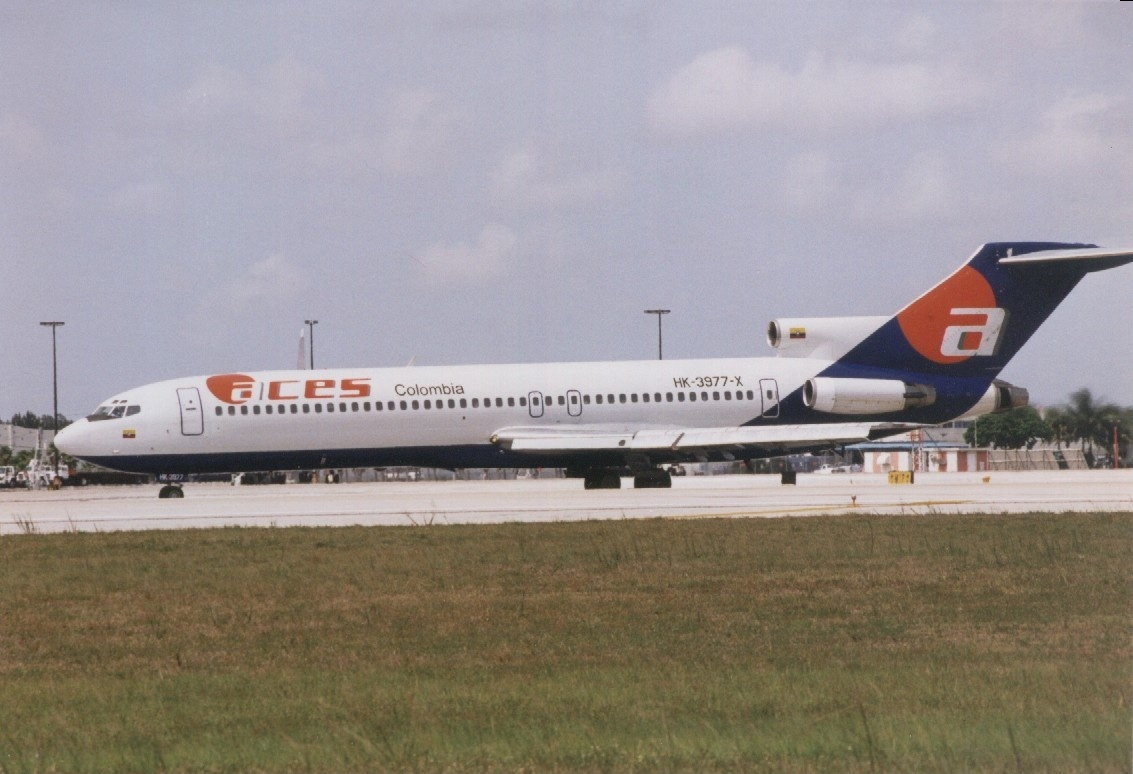
A Boeing 727-200 at Miami International Airport in 1998

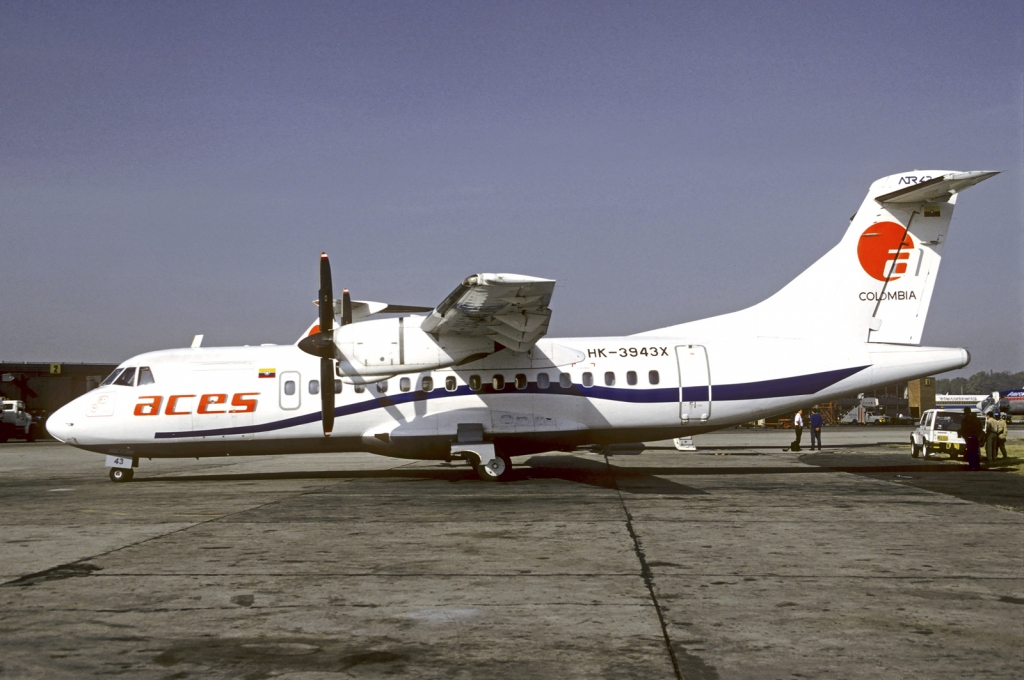
An ATR 42-320 parked at El Dorado International Airport in 1995

ACES had in the past operated a variety of aircraft, including:

ACES fleet
Aircraft	Total	Introduced	Retired	Notes
Airbus A320-200	8	1997	2003	
ATR 42-320	9	1991	2003	
ATR 42-500	6	2000	2003	
Boeing 727-100	12	1981	2000	
Boeing 727-200	6	1992	2002	
Cessna 185	1	Unknown	Unknown	
De Havilland DH.114 Heron	1	1974	1978	
De Havilland Canada DHC-6 Twin Otter	20	1976	2002	
Fairchild F-27	3	1987	1992	
Fairchild FH-227B	1	1977	1981	
Fokker F28 Fellowship	1	1984	1984	Leased from Aerolíneas Argentinas
Saunders ST-27	3	1972	1976	

== Accidents and incidents ==
- On December 18, 1981, a DHC-6 Twin Otter (registered HK-2216) crashed in the municipality of San Antero, during the approach to the Coveñas Airport. In this incident 13 people perished, including the crew composed of Captain Guillermo Alberto García and co-pilot Andrés Rafael Londoño.
- On November 29, 1982, a DHC-6 Twin Otter (registered HK-2536) crashed in the foothills of the Eastern Cordillera against Cerro Pan de Azúcar in the township of San Juanito, Meta. The flight came on a regular flight from San José del Guaviare and was heading to Bogotá under the command of Captain Marino Jiménez and co-pilot Edison Santacoloma, who along with 20 passengers lost their lives.
- On August 1, 1988, a DHC-6 Twin Otter (registered HK-2445) was hijacked and demanded the pilot to land at an abandoned airstrip in Colombia. The passengers were reportedly robbed and the hijackers escaped, which six of them were later captured.
- On November 30, 1996, a DHC-6 Twin Otter, operating flight 148, (registered HK-2602) crashed into Cerro El Barcino a few minutes after takeoff from Olaya Herrera Airport. The flight was operating the route between Medellín, Bahía Solano and Quibdó. 14 people died in the impact and subsequent fire, including the crew commanded by Captain Juan Carlos Bermúdez López; one passenger survived with serious injuries.
- On October 11, 2000, an ATR 42-500 (registered VP-BOF) and a Boeing 727-200 (registered HK-3998X) collided on the El Dorado International Airport apron during the towing process. The ATR 42-500 was declared a total loss after the incident. There were no injuries or fatalities in this event.

== See also ==
- List of defunct airlines of Colombia
