= SAM Colombia =

Colombian airline 1945–2010

Sociedad Aeronáutica de Medellin Consolidada S.A.
IATA	ICAO	Call sign
MM	SAM	SAM
- Founded: October 6, 1945
- Ceased operations: October 4, 2010
- Hubs: El Dorado International Airport
- Secondary hubs: Terminal Puente Aéreo; José María Córdova International Airport
- Frequent-flyer program: AviancaPlus
- Alliance: Alianza Summa (2002-2003)
- Fleet size: 15
- Destinations: 20 (See Avianca)
- Parent company: Avianca
- Headquarters: Bogotá, Colombia
- Key people: Fabio Villegas Ramírez (CEO)
- Founders: Luis H. Coulson, Gilberto Escobar, Julián Restrepo, Joaquín Londoño, and Gustavo Correa
- Website: www.avianca.com

SAM (Spanish acronym: Sociedad Aeronáutica de Medellín) was a Colombian airline. With its main hub at El Dorado International Airport in Bogotá, SAM operated domestic and international routes and was a subsidiary of Avianca. In 2004, its headquarters were in the Avianca headquarters in Bogotá.

== History ==
=== Early operations ===
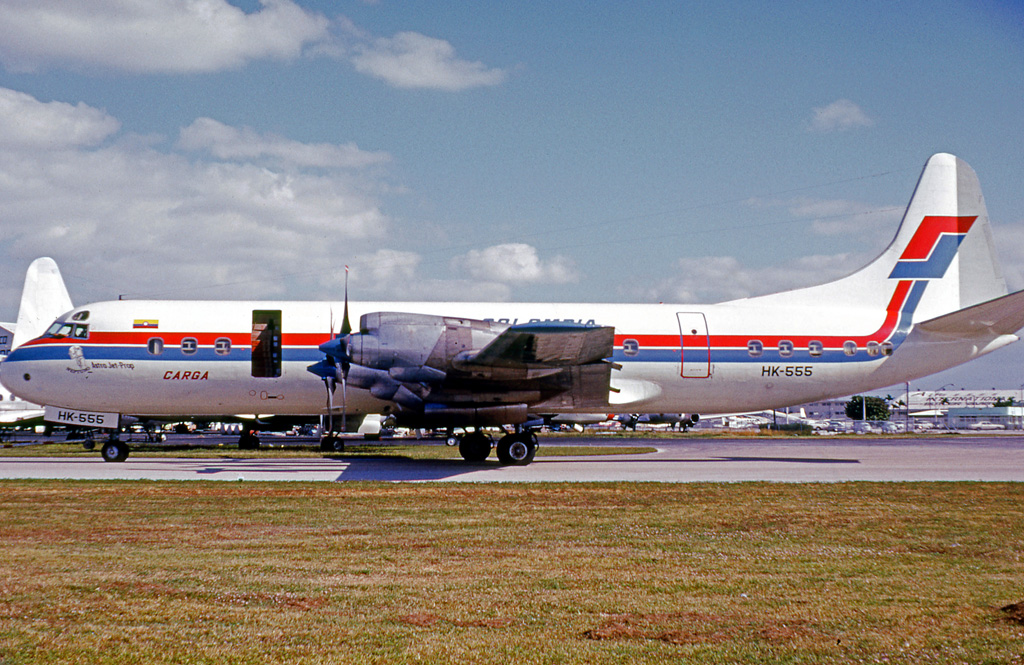
A former SAM Lockheed L-188A Electra operating a freight service at Miami International Airport in 1973

In the 1940s, a group of entrepreneurs promoted the idea of providing the city of Medellín with an air transportation system that would connect with the rest of the country and the world. In October 1945, at the 3rd Notary Public's Office, a deed incorporating Sociedad Aeronáutica de Medellín S.A. was recorded. The airline was in the minds of its first partners and promoters, who from the beginning of 1946 began to bring their dream to fruition.

The company had originally intended to acquire small aircraft, but the concept changed and grew. The airline would acquire long-range aircraft to secure the cargo market to and from Miami. The airline's first Douglas C-47 arrived in October 1946 and departed from Las Playas Airport in Medellín heading to Miami in the midst of much celebration.

SAM transported mail from Medellín to Bogotá, Barrancabermeja, Bucaramanga, Cartagena, and later began regular flights to Panama and Miami with the Curtiss C-46. However, Avianca, which was the owner of several airports in the country, suspended SAM's operations due to a ten-month delay in the payment of a debt. In 1954, after the merger of Avianca and LANSA, SAM restarted operations and created a subsidiary called RAS - Rutas Aéreas SAM. The company was advised by the Dutch airline KLM in its division in the Antilles.

=== Later years ===
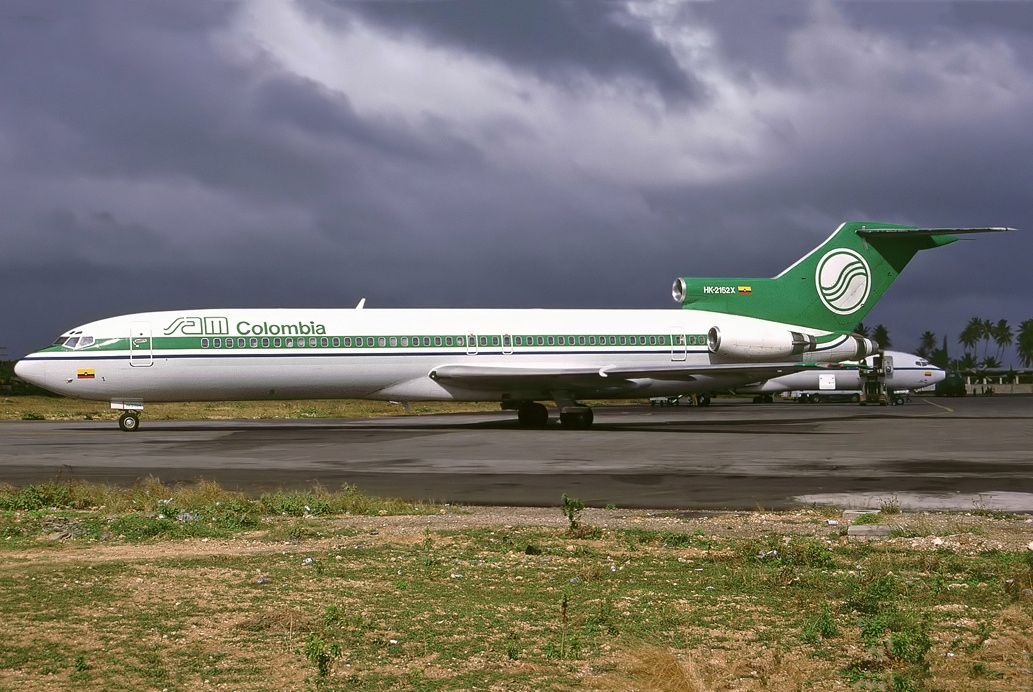
A former SAM Boeing 727-200 taxiing at Gustavo Rojas Pinilla International Airport in 1994

In the second year of activities, SAM's wings grew and began to embrace the world of the nearest Colombian cities with flights to Bogotá, Bucaramanga, Planeta Rica and Barranquilla. The airline grew quickly. Industrial and commercial activity increased to the point that in 1950s the fleet comprised 18 cargo aircraft and the destinations were now far afield. SAM's aircraft flew to and from the Caribbean and South America.

Having proved its efficiency in air transportation and establishing the routes that put an end to the isolation of Medellín and Colombia, in 1958 SAM decided to begin carrying passengers. Passenger air service began with a DC-3 and a C-46, and one of the early milestones was San Andres, where it was the first airline to provide service to the island. Two years later, the first DC-4 was added to the fleet with a capacity of 65 passengers, but it was in 1970 that SAM became notable for inaugurating the Jet-Prop era in Colombia. The Santo Domingo Group had provided broader capital to enable accelerated modernization and expanded market share.

With the introduction of the Lockheed L-188 into service, the expansion into Central America was made possible and passenger services began to Nicaragua, El Salvador, Guatemala and Costa Rica with regular freight schedules that were operated to Miami. Later in 1977, SAM introduced the Boeing 720B which were transferred from Avianca, with which the Lockheed Electras were returned to Eastern Air Lines.

Around 1990, SAM requested to resume cargo flights to the United States and the company made a request to Challenger Air Cargo to lease one of its Boeing 757s, at the same time that Avianca suspended cargo services to Miami, and sold its 747 freighters. The request was cancelled and SAM leased a Boeing 707-320C to carry out the flights to Miami.

Starting in 1992, the company modernized its fleet with the Boeing 727-200, subsequently the Avro RJ100, and the De Havilland Canada Twin Otter as well. With these modern aircraft, SAM connected the most important cities of the country, as well as several regional and international destinations. However, there were problems with the RJ100 engines, which were paralyzed on the ground and the company had to use aircraft from Avianca to cover its flights, and the aircraft were returned to the manufacturer British Aerospace in March 2000, and purchased 3 Cessna 208 Caravans. Avianca's Fokker 50 and McDonnell Douglas MD-83 were also assigned.

On May 20, 2002, SAM along with Avianca and ACES, joined and formed the Alianza Summa to offer a more efficient service to compete in a new struggling marketplace. However, in the following year, ACES was dissolved and Avianca was purchased by the Synergy Group and change its image, for which the colors of SAM disappeared. However, SAM operated 15 exclusive Fokker 100s in the Avianca livery with a sign that read "Operated by Sam" on the fuselage.

On December 10, 2004, Avianca concluded a major reorganization process, undertaken after filing for Chapter 11 bankruptcy protection, by obtaining confirmation of its reorganization plan, which was financially backed by the Brazilian consortium, Synergy Group and the National Federation of Coffee Growers of Colombia, allowing the airline to obtain funds for US$63 million, in the 13 months following withdrawal from bankruptcy.

SAM closed its operations on October 4, 2010, when its final flight took off from Bogotá bound for Medellín. With this flight, SAM was permanently merged into Avianca.

== Fleet ==
=== Final fleet ===
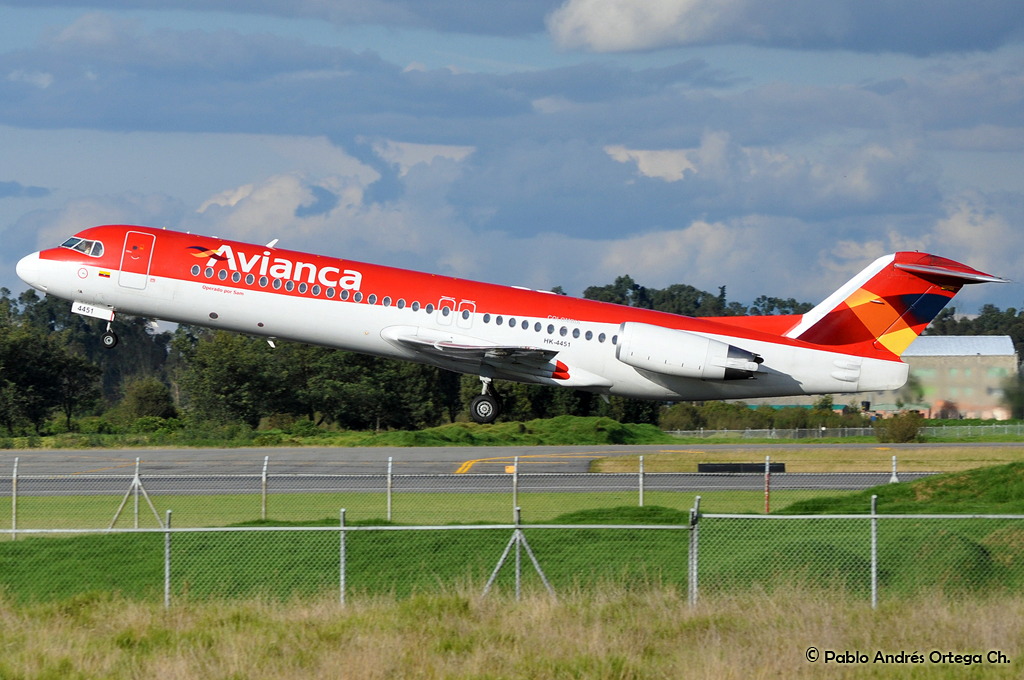
An Avianca Fokker 100, operated by SAM, taking off at El Dorado International Airport in 2009

As of May 2010, the SAM fleet consisted of the following aircraft:

SAM Colombia fleet
Aircraft	In service	Passengers			Notes
Aircraft	In service	J	Y	Total	Notes
Fokker 100	15	8	89	97	Operated in Avianca livery since 2006.
Total	15				

=== Former fleet ===
SAM had in the past operated a variety of aircraft, including:

SAM Colombia former fleet
Aircraft	Total	Introduced	Retired	Notes
Avro RJ100	9	1994	2000	Transferred to Malmö Aviation
Beechcraft 65	3	1971	Unknown	
Bell 206	1	1998	1998	
Boeing 707-320C	1	1982	1983	Leased from Avianca
Boeing 707-320C	1	1991	1991	Leased from Florida West Airlines
Boeing 720B	3	1977	1982	Leased from Avianca
Boeing 727-100	14	1981	1995	
Boeing 727-200	6	1992	1999	
Cessna 208B Grand Caravan	3	1999	2001	
Curtiss C-46 Commando	10	1950	1966	
De Havilland Canada DHC-6 Twin Otter	3	1998	2001	
Douglas C-47 Skytrain	16	1946	1959	
Douglas C-54 Skymaster	12	1955	1970	
Douglas DC-4	1	1968	1970	
Douglas DC-6B	2	1960	1961	Leased from KLM
Fokker 50	5	2001	2007	Leased from Avianca
Lockheed L-188A Electra	8	1969	1977	Leased from Eastern Air Lines
McDonnell Douglas MD-83	3	1999	2007	

== Accidents and incidents ==
- On March 1, 1950, a Douglas C-47 (registered HK-507) took off from Olaya Herrera Airport to conduct a test flight following repairs that were carried out on engine No. 1. Upon returning to the airport, the pilot was cleared to land. Shortly afterwards, the airplane entered an area of heavy strong winds. The aircraft impacted the ground, killing the co-pilot and one of the two mechanics.
- On June 13, 1951, a Douglas C-47 (registered HK-504) made an emergency return to Olaya Herrera Airport and crashed after striking a chimney of a factory in the Belén suburb of Medellín. Both crew members on board were killed, including a person on the ground.
- On September 10, 1952, a Curtiss C-46 (registered HK-513) was on a flight from San Andrés (island) to Cartagena, the crew encountered poor weather conditions and lost their route. The aircraft hit a mountain located in Guna Yala, Panama. All 46 occupants were killed.
- On September 16, 1958, a Curtiss C-46 (registered HK-514) crashed shortly after takeoff from Olaya Herrera Airport while in initial climb. The aircraft suffered an engine failure, the crew attempted an emergency landing in a wasteland where it crash landed. Both crew members were uninjured while the aircraft was damaged beyond repair.
- On December 8, 1959, a Curtiss C-46 (registered HK-515) en route from San Andrés to Cartagena, disappeared. About 8 days later, the right main gear wheel assembly was found near Moron Island. All 42 passengers and 3 crew were presumed killed.
- On March 19, 1960, SAM Flight 901, a Curtiss C-46 (registered HK-516), departed San Andres Island for a flight to Medellín when engine no.1 started to have problems. The crew radioed Medellín that they were returning to Planeta Rica, but the plane crashed 11 km Northwest. 25 of the 46 occupants on board were killed and the aircraft was written off.
- On February 5, 1969, a Douglas C-54 (registered HK-1065) was hijacked by an armed passenger. The aircraft was en route from Barranquilla to Cartagena, Medellín and Cali. The hijacked demanded the pilots to be flown to Cuba. None of the 47 occupants on board were injured.
- On March 11, 1969, a Douglas C-54 (registered HK-757) was hijacked during a domestic flight from Medellín to Barranquilla. A hijacker entered the cockpit and demanded to be flown to Cuba.
- On May 30, 1973, SAM Colombia Flight 601, a Lockheed L-188 Electra (registered HK-1274), flying from Cali to Medellín with a stopover in Pereira, was diverted from its route making stops in Aruba, Guayaquil, Lima, Mendoza, Asunción, and Buenos Aires, had been hijacked by two Paraguayan former football players for economic reasons.
- On May 19, 1993, SAM Colombia Flight 501, a Boeing 727-100 (registered HK-2422X), en route from Panama City to Medellín, hit Mt. Paramo de Frontino at 12,300 ft. while on approach to José María Córdova International Airport. The aircraft descended into mountainous terrain before actually reaching the Abejorral non-directional beacon. The (VHF/DME) had been sabotaged by terrorists and was not in service. All 132 passengers (including a group of Panamanian dentists and doctors on their way to a convention) were killed.
- On August 4, 1993, a Boeing 727-100 (registered HK-2421X) was damaged beyond repairs after its no. 3 engine caught on fire during maintenance work.

== In other areas ==
SAM was the main sponsor of the Atlético Nacional football team between 1988 and 1994, the airline's logo was used on the front of their jersey during competitions of those years, including the 1989 Copa Libertadores.

== See also ==
- Avianca
- List of defunct airlines of Colombia
