= Flight 601 =

Flight 601 may refer to:

- Eastern Airlines Flight 601, crashed on 19 July 1951
- Thai Airways International Flight 601, crashed 30 June 1967
- Aeroflot Flight 601, crashed on 24 December 1983
- Sita Air Flight 601, crashed on 28 September 2012
- SAM Colombia Flight 601 hijacked on 30 May 1973
