= Peterborough Regional Airport =

Airport near Peterborough, Ontario, Canada

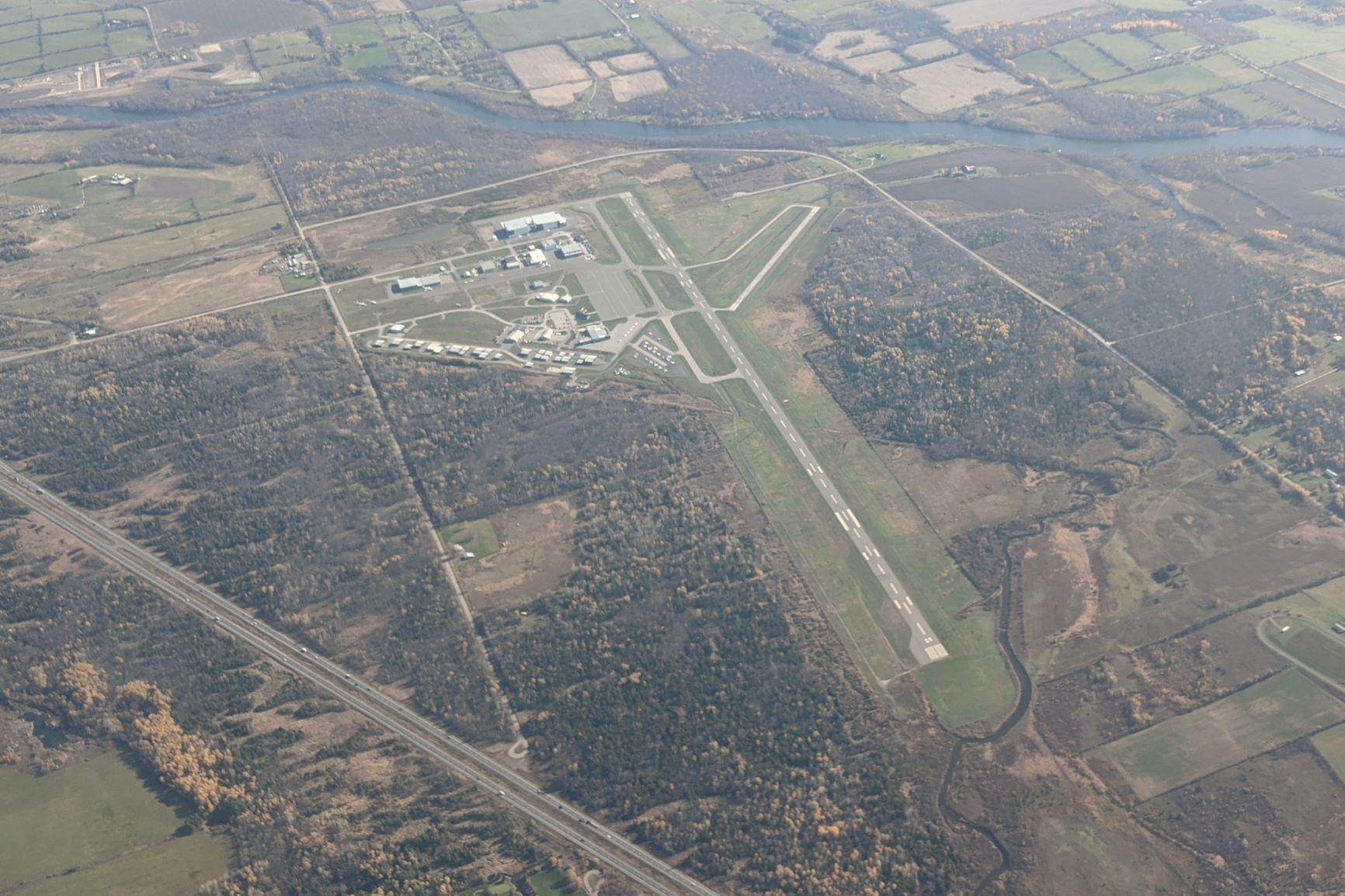
- IATA: YPQ; ICAO: CYPQ; WMO: 71436

Summary
- Airport type: Public
- Operator: City of Peterborough
- Serves: Peterborough, Ontario
- Location: Peterborough County
- Time zone: EST (UTC−05:00)
  - Summer (DST): EDT (UTC−04:00)
- Elevation AMSL: 628 ft (191 m)
- Coordinates: 44°13′50″N 078°21′47″W
- Website: Peterborough Regional Airport

Map
- Location in Ontario

Runways
| Direction | Length | | Surface |
| Direction | ft | m | Surface |
|---|---|---|---|
| 09/27 | 7,005 | 2,135 | Asphalt |
| 13/31 | 2,000 | 610 | Asphalt |

Statistics (2018)
- Aircraft movements: 45,800
- Source: Canada Flight Supplement; Environment Canada; Movements from Statistics Canada

Peterborough Regional Airport (IATA: YPQ, ICAO: CYPQ) is located 3 nautical miles (5.6 km; 3.5 mi) south-southwest of the city of Peterborough, Ontario, Canada in Cavan Monaghan Township. It includes a main 7,005 by 100 ft (2,135 by 30 m) asphalt runway oriented east-west, and a smaller 2,000 by 49 ft (610 by 15 m) asphalt (paved 2014) runway oriented northwest-southeast. A new terminal building was built in 2011. Aircraft completions company Flying Colours Corp. is the largest tenant at the airport.

The airport is classified as an airport of entry by Nav Canada and is staffed by the Canada Border Services Agency (CBSA) on a call-out basis from the Oshawa Executive Airport. CBSA officers at this airport can handle general aviation aircraft only, with no more than 15 passengers.

Work has been completed to expand an existing 5,000 ft (1,500 m) asphalt runway to 7,005 ft (2,135 m), making the runway capable of handling larger aircraft such as the Airbus A320 and the Boeing 737.

Seneca Polytechnic relocated its School of Aviation Technology to Peterborough Regional Airport in January 2014, after their former airport Buttonville was scheduled to close. Seneca had 170 students in classes at its new facility in 2014. The $8.6 million contract was awarded to Mortlock Construction Inc. Mortlock significantly expanded an existing building that the city owned at the airport to about 46,000 square feet from 21,000 square feet, and completed the interior of the structure to the college's specifications with offices, rooms for flight simulators, classrooms, a student lounge, washrooms and a kitchen. Seneca's School of Aviation and Flight Technology has 19 aircraft at the airport.

== Tenants ==
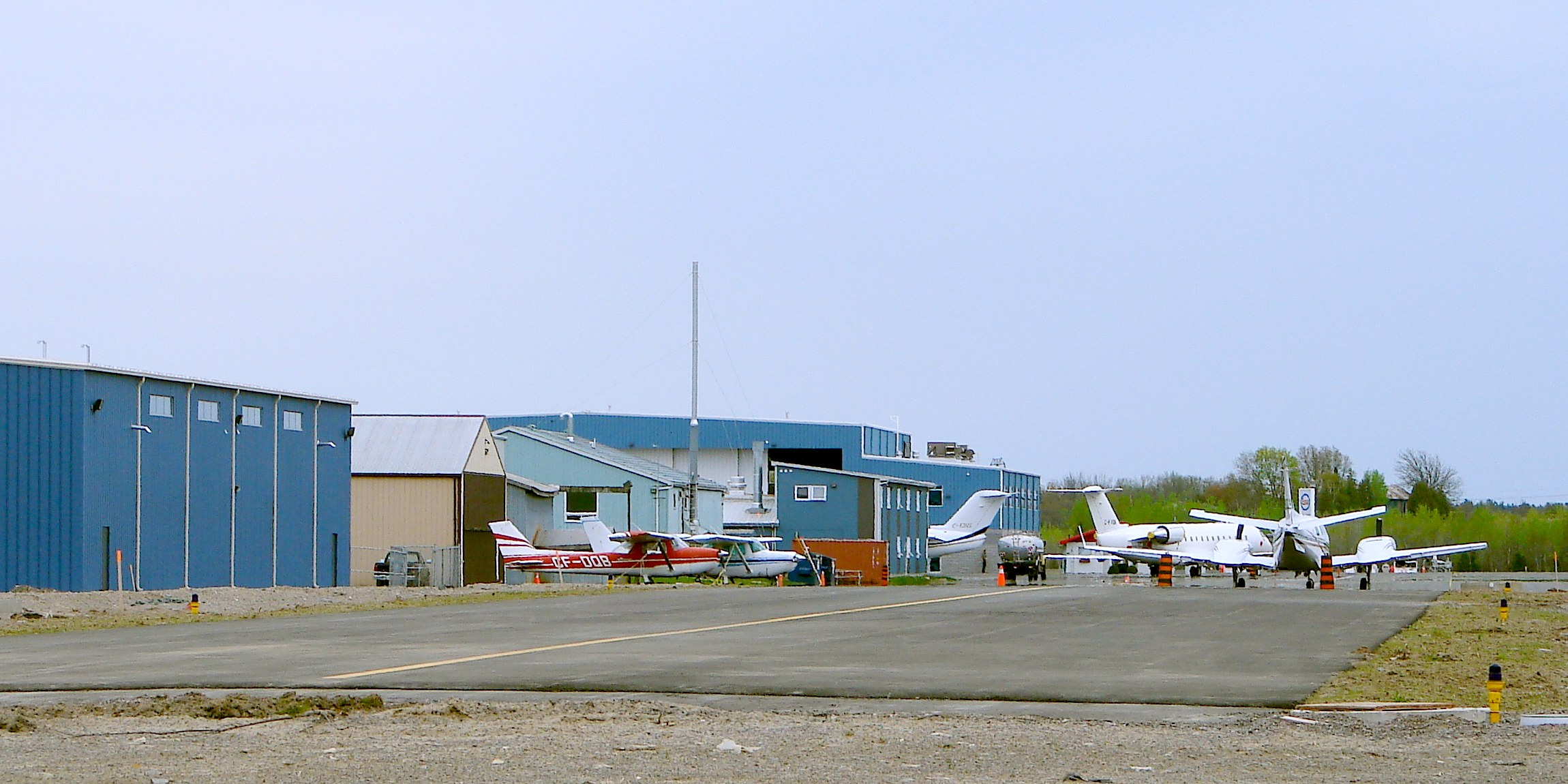
Apron at Peterborough Regional Airport

=== Current ===
- The Loomex Group, airport operators
- Airtech Canada Aviation Services - aircraft engineering, manufacturing, and modification company; customer interior for medevac clients
- Flying Colours Corporation - aircraft care and design (Owned by Flexjet)
- Flexjet - Fractional Ownership of Private Jets
- International Aircraft Support & Turbine Engine Sales - parts supplier for the Beechcraft King Air, 1900 Airliner and Pratt & Whitney Gas Turbine engines.
- Turbine Engine Sales - Pratt & Whitney parts supplier
- Kadex Aero Supply - Wholesale Aircraft Parts and Services
- President Air Charter - business charter
- Rapid Aircraft Repair Incorporated
- The Loomex Group- Airport operation and management, property management, emergency management training, emergency exercise design, public relations, communication and marketing
- Complete Aviation Services Limited FBO
- Vector Air Limited - executive class air charter service
- W.M. Aeroservice - general aviation maintenance, aircraft repair, private and commercial pilot training
- Seneca Polytechnic, School of Aviation - provides the only aviation technology-based bachelor's degree in Canada

=== Former ===
- Otonabee Airways (Air Atonabee Limited 1980), 1975–1984
- Gardens & Fields Restaurant - family dining
- Toronto Avionics - Avionics shop. Closed in 2024

== Transportation ==
The airport is reached by car from Highway 115 via Airport Road. Parking is available on-site, although there are few spaces available.
