= SAM Colombia Flight 501 =

1993 aviation accident

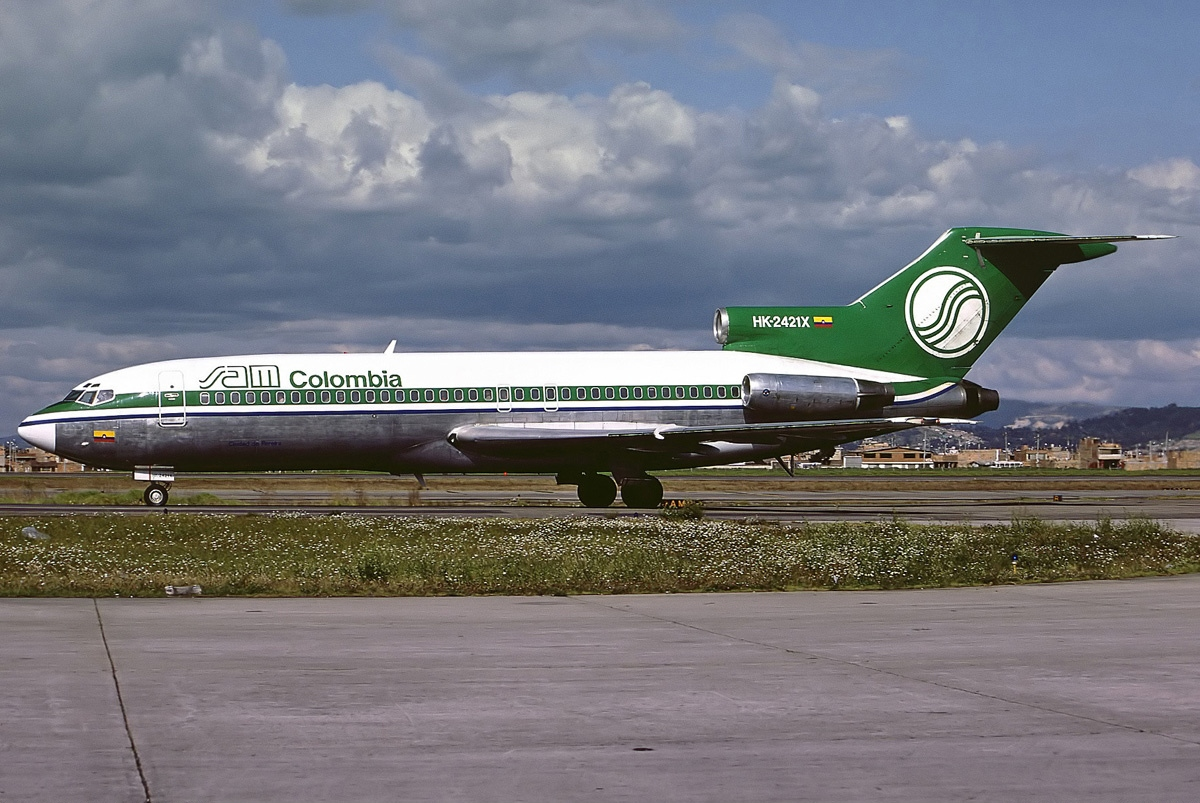
- A SAM Colombia Boeing 727, similar to the one involved

Accident
- Date: 19 May 1993
- Summary: Controlled flight into terrain caused by pilot error in inclement weather
- Site: Mt. Paramo Frontino, Urrao, Antioquia Department, Colombia; 06°27′05″N 076°07′00″W

Aircraft
- Aircraft type: Boeing 727-46
- Operator: SAM Colombia
- IATA flight No.: MM501
- ICAO flight No.: SAM501
- Call sign: SAM 501
- Registration: HK-2422X
- Flight origin: Tocumen International Airport, Panama City, Panama
- Stopover: José María Córdova International Airport, Medellín, Colombia
- Destination: El Dorado International Airport, Bogotá, Colombia
- Occupants: 132
- Passengers: 125
- Crew: 7
- Fatalities: 132
- Survivors: 0

SAM Colombia Flight 501 was a Boeing 727-46 that crashed on 19 May 1993, killing all 132 on board. The aircraft collided with a mountain while on approach to Medellín, Colombia.

== Aircraft and crew ==
The aircraft involved was a Boeing 727-46, registered as HK-2422X (factory no. 18876, serial no. 217), which was built in 1965 and had its maiden flight on December 30 of that year. The aircraft was powered by three Pratt & Whitney JT8D-7A turbofan engines. The aircraft was delivered to Japan Airlines on January 7, 1966, and was registered as JA8309. On November 16, 1972, the airliner was leased to Korean Air, where it was re-registered as HL7309. On November 9, 1980, Korean Air sold the aircraft to SAM Colombia, where it was re-registered as HK-2422X.

The captain was 31-year-old Mauricio Oswaldo Vacca Mejía, qualified in May 1992 as a Boeing 727 commander, he had clocked a total of 3,943 flying hours. His first officer, 29-year-old Julio César Andrade Granados, had a total of 1,651 flying hours, and worked as a flight engineer prior to qualifying as a co-pilot in February 1993. 45-year-old Flight Engineer Jaime Eduardo Martínez Basallo had a total of 553 hours with SAM Colombia since he was employed in mid-1992.

== Accident ==
At 14:18, Flight 501 took off from Panama City, Panama, bound for Bogotá, Colombia, with a stopover in Medellín. The aircraft climbed to flight level 160 (about 16,000 feet (4,900 m)). On board were 7 crew members and 125 passengers, including several Panamanian dentists on their way to a convention.

Thunderstorm activity in the area made automatic direction finder (ADF) navigation more difficult, and the Medellín VOR/DME was unusable, having been attacked by terrorists. The crew reported over the Abejorral NDB beacon at FL160, as they were approaching Medellín. The flight was then cleared to descend to FL120 (about 12,000 feet (3,700 m)), after which communication was lost. After multiple failed attempts to contact the flight, Medellín ATC declared an emergency.

Because the radio beacon was unserviceable, the crew made navigational errors. The 727 had actually not yet reached the beacon and descended into mountainous terrain. The flight then struck the 3,749-metre-high (12,300 ft) Mount Paramo Frontino.
