= City Express =

Canadian airline

City Express Cité Express
IATA	ICAO	Call sign
OU	OUL	CITY EXPRESS
- Founded: December 29, 1971
- Commenced operations: May 1984
- Ceased operations: February 1991
- Hubs: Billy Bishop Toronto City Airport
- Destinations: 10
- Headquarters: Toronto, Ontario (1984-1991)
- Key people: Victor Pappalardo , Founder and President

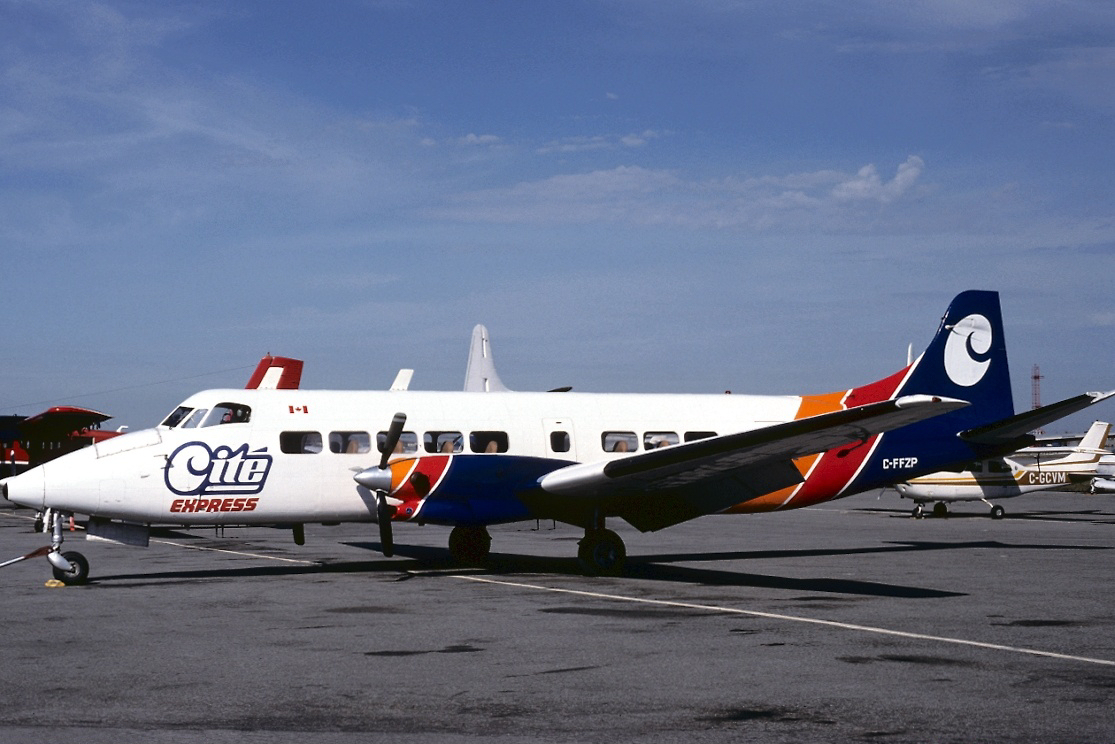
City Express Saunders ST-27

City Express (French: Cité Express), also known as Air Atonabee Ltd., was an airline based in Ontario, Canada, from 1971 to 1991, which operated passenger services in eastern Canada and the northeastern United States.

== History ==
City Express was founded by Joseph Csumrik in 1971 as Otonabee Airways based at Peterborough Airport in Peterborough, Ontario. It began scheduled service in 1975. In 1980 the company was renamed to Air Atonabee Ltd.

In 1984, Air Atonabee was acquired by Victor Pappalardo and reorganized into City Express. The airline relocated its base to Toronto Island Airport (now Billy Bishop Toronto City Airport) (YTZ) where it began STOL service.

City Express ceased operations in February 1991.

== Destinations ==
Destinations included:

- Montreal - Montréal-Pierre Elliott Trudeau International Airport / Montreal-Mirabel International Airport
- Ottawa - Ottawa Macdonald–Cartier International Airport
- Quebec City - Québec City Jean Lesage International Airport
- New York/Newark - Newark Liberty International Airport
- Detroit - Detroit Metropolitan Airport
- London, Ontario - London International Airport
- Sept-Îles, Quebec
- Wabush/Labrador City, NL

== Fleet ==
- 4 De Havilland Canada Dash 8
- 4 de Havilland Canada Dash 7
- 9 Saunders ST-27

== See also ==
- List of defunct airlines of Canada
