= Saunders Aircraft Company =

Canadian aircraft manufacturer

- Founded: 1968
- Founder: David Saunders
- Headquarters: Gimli, Manitoba, Canada
- Products: Aircraft
- Number of employees: 10

The Saunders Aircraft Company was a Canadian aircraft manufacturer, originally based in Montreal before moving to Gimli, Manitoba.

== History ==
Saunders Aircraft Company was founded in 1968 by David Saunders in Montreal, Quebec, as a privately financed enterprise. The company ran short of funds and production space at the same time as the Canadian government closed its airbase in Gimli, Manitoba. The provincial government of Manitoba, in an effort to encourage industry in the province, promised Saunders funding if they would move to Gimli; the company agreed. By 1970, the government had given the company $37 million. The company produced thirteen of its Saunders ST-27 aircraft, which were converted de Havilland Herons. The company then began work on the ST-28, intended to be a commuter/taxi aircraft, also based on the Heron. The first ST-28 flew in December 1975. Shortly thereafter, the government of Manitoba withdrew funding. At its peak, the company employed 500; by 1976, the company was reduced to around 10 employees as a result of the loss of funding.
