= Planeta Rica =

- Municipality and town
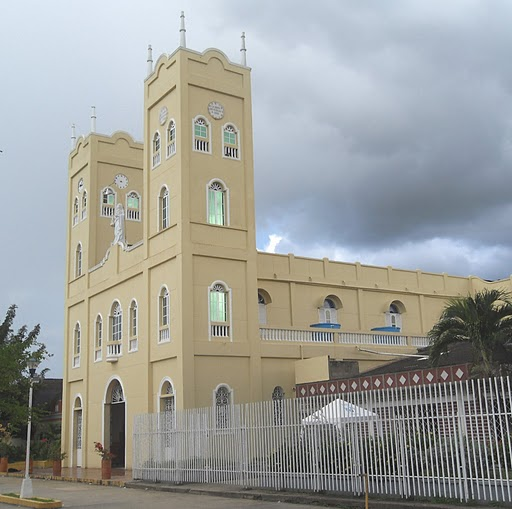

- Flag Coat of arms

- Location of the municipality and town of Planeta Rica in the Córdoba Department of Colombia
- Coordinates: 8°24′32″N 75°34′55″W
- Country: Colombia
- Department: Córdoba Department

Area
  - Municipality and town: 1,141 km^{2} (441 sq mi)
  - Urban: 4.48 km^{2} (1.73 sq mi)

Population (2020 est.)
  - Municipality and town: 64,776
  - Density: 56.77/km^{2} (147.0/sq mi)
  - Urban: 41,267
  - Urban density: 9,210/km^{2} (23,900/sq mi)
- Time zone: UTC-5 (Colombia Standard Time)

Planeta Rica is a town and municipality located in the Córdoba Department, northern Colombia.

According to 2020 estimates, the population of Planeta Rica was 64,776, with a population density of 57 persons per square kilometer.

== Climate ==
Climate data for Planeta Rica, elevation 90 m (300 ft), (1981–2010)
Month	Jan	Feb	Mar	Apr	May	Jun	Jul	Aug	Sep	Oct	Nov	Dec	Year
Mean daily maximum °C (°F)	33.7 (92.7)	34.7 (94.5)	34.6 (94.3)	33.5 (92.3)	32.3 (90.1)	32.0 (89.6)	32.1 (89.8)	32.0 (89.6)	31.9 (89.4)	31.7 (89.1)	31.8 (89.2)	32.4 (90.3)	32.7 (90.9)
Daily mean °C (°F)	27.8 (82.0)	28.0 (82.4)	28.3 (82.9)	28.2 (82.8)	27.7 (81.9)	27.7 (81.9)	27.6 (81.7)	27.5 (81.5)	27.3 (81.1)	27.2 (81.0)	27.2 (81.0)	27.5 (81.5)	27.6 (81.7)
Mean daily minimum °C (°F)	22.7 (72.9)	23.0 (73.4)	23.2 (73.8)	23.6 (74.5)	23.6 (74.5)	23.3 (73.9)	23.0 (73.4)	22.9 (73.2)	23.0 (73.4)	23.0 (73.4)	23.0 (73.4)	22.9 (73.2)	23.1 (73.6)
Average precipitation mm (inches)	13.3 (0.52)	17.5 (0.69)	49.0 (1.93)	132.5 (5.22)	208.9 (8.22)	213.8 (8.42)	205.2 (8.08)	241.4 (9.50)	192.6 (7.58)	165.4 (6.51)	100.2 (3.94)	45.4 (1.79)	1,531.8 (60.31)
Average precipitation days	3	3	5	10	14	14	15	17	15	13	9	5	118
Average relative humidity (%)	78	77	76	78	82	82	82	83	83	83	83	82	81
Mean monthly sunshine hours	195.3	172.2	155.0	129.0	130.2	147.0	170.5	173.6	138.0	148.8	153.0	176.7	1,889.3
Mean daily sunshine hours	6.3	6.1	5.0	4.3	4.2	4.9	5.5	5.6	4.6	4.8	5.1	5.7	5.2
Source: Instituto de Hidrologia Meteorologia y Estudios Ambientales

Climate data for Planeta Rica (Centro Alegre), elevation 170 m (560 ft), (1981–2010)
Month	Jan	Feb	Mar	Apr	May	Jun	Jul	Aug	Sep	Oct	Nov	Dec	Year
Mean daily maximum °C (°F)	33.8 (92.8)	34.0 (93.2)	34.2 (93.6)	33.7 (92.7)	32.8 (91.0)	33.0 (91.4)	32.7 (90.9)	32.6 (90.7)	32.7 (90.9)	32.5 (90.5)	32.5 (90.5)	32.7 (90.9)	33.1 (91.6)
Daily mean °C (°F)	28.1 (82.6)	28.2 (82.8)	28.3 (82.9)	28.1 (82.6)	27.7 (81.9)	27.8 (82.0)	27.6 (81.7)	27.6 (81.7)	27.5 (81.5)	27.3 (81.1)	27.6 (81.7)	27.8 (82.0)	27.8 (82.0)
Mean daily minimum °C (°F)	22.5 (72.5)	22.9 (73.2)	22.7 (72.9)	22.8 (73.0)	22.6 (72.7)	22.6 (72.7)	22.4 (72.3)	22.4 (72.3)	22.3 (72.1)	22.3 (72.1)	22.7 (72.9)	22.6 (72.7)	22.6 (72.7)
Average precipitation mm (inches)	58.2 (2.29)	139.0 (5.47)	113.4 (4.46)	104.1 (4.10)	140.9 (5.55)	137.1 (5.40)	131.5 (5.18)	160.9 (6.33)	156.4 (6.16)	141.2 (5.56)	225.8 (8.89)	202.5 (7.97)	1,711 (67.36)
Average precipitation days	3	4	5	10	15	14	16	16	14	14	10	4	124
Average relative humidity (%)	80	79	78	80	83	83	83	84	84	84	84	83	82
Source: Instituto de Hidrologia Meteorologia y Estudios Ambientales
