= Saunders ST-27 =

Canadian regional aircraft, 1969

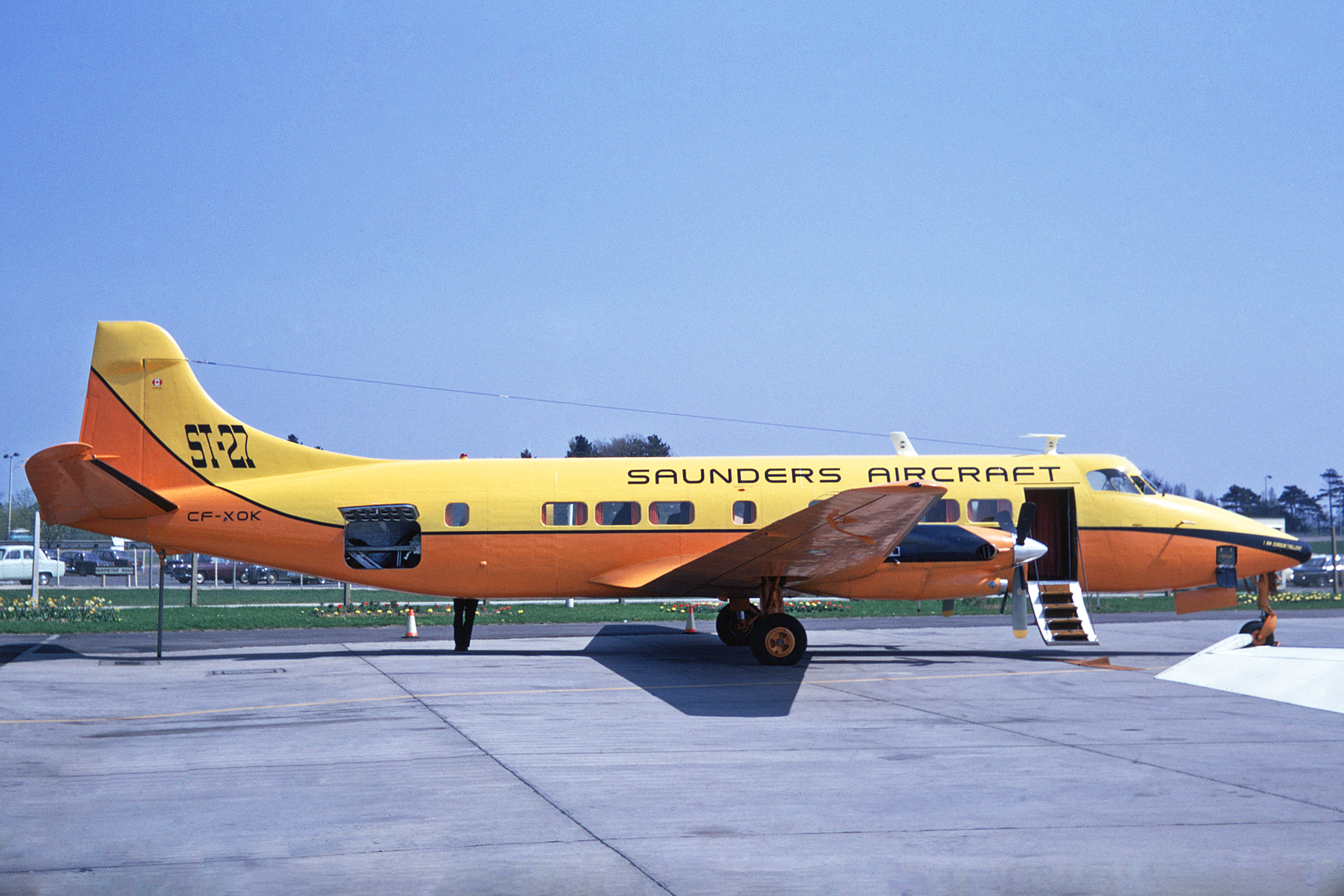
- Saunders ST-27 at London Gatwick Airport (May 1970)

General information
- Type: Airliner
- Manufacturer: Saunders Aircraft Company
- Designer: David Saunders
- Primary users: Air Atonobee Aerolineas Centrales de Colombia
- Number built: 12

History
- Manufactured: 1969–1976
- First flight: 28 May 1969
- Retired: 1980s
- Developed from: de Havilland Heron

The Saunders ST-27 was a regional aircraft built in the 1970s by the Canadian Saunders Aircraft Company based at Gimli, Manitoba. The aircraft was designed as a conversion of the earlier de Havilland Heron. The conversion program was extensive and featured two Pratt & Whitney Canada PT6 turboprops and a stretched fuselage. Despite its promise as a regional airliner, the project collapsed when Manitoba government funding was withdrawn in 1976.

== Design and development ==
Using 13 surplus de Havilland Herons airframes, Saunders designed the conversion and utilized some engineering input from Aviation Traders (Engineering). The remanufactured design was based on a stretched fuselage to accommodate 23 passengers, a lengthened nose to fit radar, reshaped vertical tail (also increased in size) and two Pratt and Whitney PT6A turboprops replacing the original four Gipsy Queen piston engines, along with other minor changes. All of the aircraft's systems, including the brakes, were pneumatic with the exception of the windshield wipers, which were hydraulic.

The prototype made its first flight on 28 May 1969.

== Operational history ==
Originally based in Montreal, Quebec, the Saunders operation moved to Gimli, Manitoba in 1971 after substantial start-up funding was obtained from the Manitoba provincial government. The government eventually invested $52 million (Canadian) until 1976 when the funding was cancelled. Only 12 ST-27s were built. Although the improved performance of the turboprops was appreciated by prospective customers, the lack of a US certification limited potential sales. Two Saunders ST-27s were dry-leased to "Sky-West" in order to provide scheduled air service to Yorkton, Dauphin and Brandon (from Saskatoon and Winnipeg) as an economic development project. Other ST-27s served as regional airliners in Ontario and elsewhere but few air carriers were exploiting this route system at the time. The notable exception was Air Otonabee (from 1980: Air Atonabee) operating scheduled passenger service from the Island Airport (Toronto), using ST-27 aircraft beginning in 1974; by 1984, it was carrying 25,000 passengers annually.

=== Saunders ST-28 ===
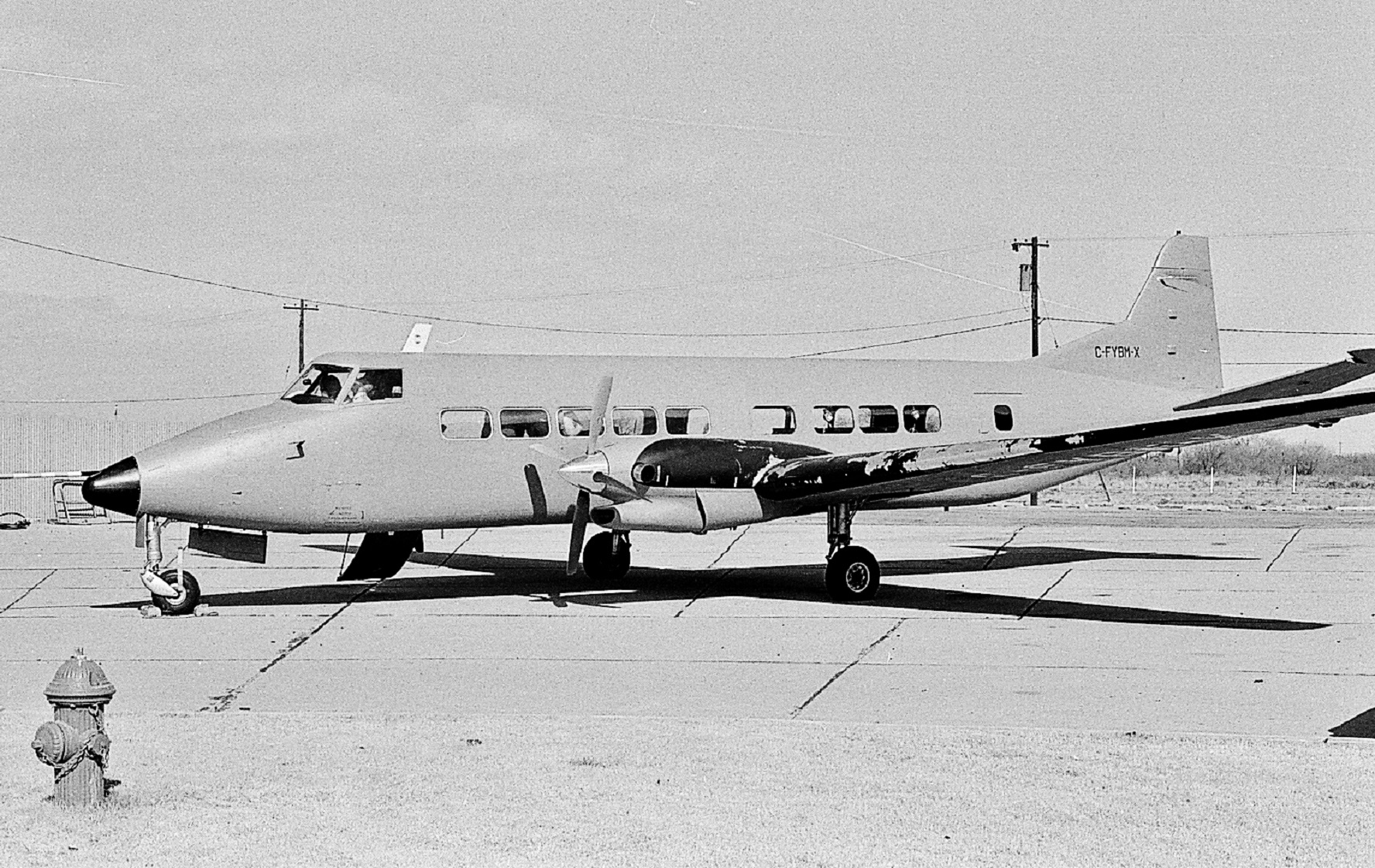
Saunders ST-28 prototype at Marana, 1975

With only meager sales success due to the certification issue and with old Herons becoming more expensive, the company decided to manufacture a new version based on the original ST-27, compliant with US Federal Aviation Regulation Part 23 (FAR 23). The first ST-28 was manufactured at the Gimli, Manitoba factory using new jigs and tooling supplied by Hawker Siddeley Aviation. Although superficially similar to the earlier ST-27, the new aircraft benefited from the experiences of flying the earlier airliner in regular service. Larger cabin windows, an increased rudder size, four-bladed propellers and a host of other enhancements were incorporated in the ST-28, including a 1,000 lb (450 kg) increase in maximum takeoff weight (MTOW) and extra fuel capacity. The first flight of the prototype, C-FYBM-X took place on 18 July 1974.

While testing was taking place towards an American certification, the Saunders company had plans for series production but no firm orders and a tremendous drain on available funding. The precarious financial situation eventually led to a review by the Manitoba government and the withdrawal of funding in 1976. The company was forced to wind down operations and sold all assets and rights to Air Otonabee, one of the primary operators of the earlier ST-27. By the early 1980s, the sturdy airliners began to fade from service with the last ST-27 being retired during this period.

== Aftermath ==
C-GCML (cn 009) was converted from DH Heron c/no. 14095 in 1974 and is now on display at the Canadian Bushplane Heritage Centre, Sault Ste Marie, Ontario, Canada. The ST-28 prototype owned by the Western Canada Aviation Museum and originally stored at the Gimli Airport, was cut up for scrap in 2014.

== Operators ==
Canada

- Air Atonabee (Otonabee Airways) - City Express
- On Air Limited, Thunder Bay Ont. Airtport, YQT
- Bearskin Lake Air Service
- Northward Airlines
- Voyageur Airways

Colombia

- Aerolinas Centrales de Colombia - ACES Colombia

== Specifications for Saunders ST-27 ==
Data from Jane's All The World's Aircraft 1971–72

General characteristics

- Crew: 2
- Capacity: 24 passengers
- Length: 58 ft 10 in (17.93 m)
- Wingspan: 71 ft 6 in (21.79 m)
- Height: 15 ft 7 in (4.75 m)
- Wing area: 499 sq ft (46.4 m^{2})
- Aspect ratio: 10.3:1
- Empty weight: 7,600 lb (3,447 kg)
- Max takeoff weight: 13,500 lb (6,123 kg)
- Fuel capacity: 320 imp gal (380 US gal; 1,500 L)
- Powerplant: 2 × Pratt & Whitney Canada PT6A-27 turboprops, 715 shp (533 kW) each (eshp)
- Propellers: 3-bladed Hartzell fully-feathering and reversing constant-speed propellers, 7 ft 6 in (2.29 m) diameter

Performance

- Cruise speed: 230 mph (370 km/h, 200 kn) at 7,000 ft (2,100 m) (max cruise); 210 mph (340 km/h; 180 kn) at 7,000 ft (2,100 m) (econ cruise)
- Stall speed: 70 mph (110 km/h, 61 kn) (flaps down)
- Never exceed speed: 292 mph (470 km/h, 254 kn)
- Range: 852 mi (1,371 km, 740 nmi)
- Service ceiling: 25,000 ft (7,600 m)
- Rate of climb: 1,600 ft/min (8.1 m/s)
- Takeoff run to 50 ft (15 m): 2,350 ft (720 m)
- Landing run from 50 ft (15 m): 1,150 ft (350 m)
