= SAM Colombia Flight 601 =

1973 hijacking of a Colombian airliner

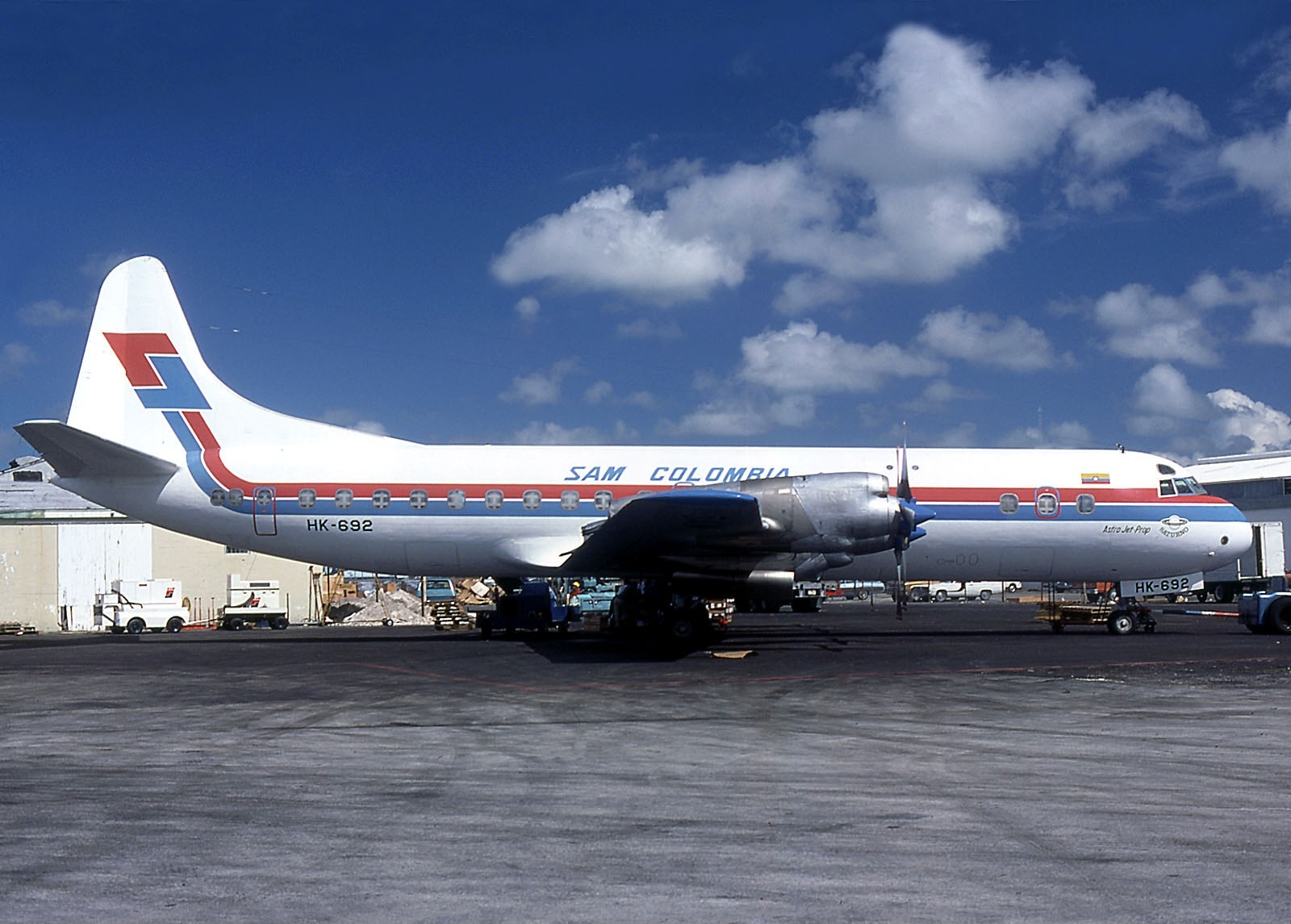
- A SAM Lockheed L-188 similar to the one involved

Hijacking
- Date: 30 May 1973
- Summary: Hijacking for profit

Aircraft
- Aircraft type: Lockheed L-188 Electra
- Aircraft name: Venus
- Operator: SAM Colombia
- Registration: HK-1274
- Flight origin: Alfonso Bonilla Aragón International Airport, Cali, Colombia
- Last stopover: Silvio Pettirossi International Airport, Asunción, Paraguay
- Destination: Enrique Olaya Herrera Airport, Medellín, Colombia
- Occupants: 88
- Passengers: 84
- Crew: 4
- Fatalities: 0

The SAM Colombia Flight 601 was a Lockheed L-188 Electra, which was hijacked when it was scheduled to fly from Alfonso Bonilla Aragón International Airport of Cali to Enrique Olaya Herrera Airport in Medellín, with a stop at Matecaña International Airport in Pereira, Colombia on May 30, 1973. It was one of the longest hijackings in the history of commercial aviation. 84 passengers were on board with at least four crew members.

== Hijacking ==
The hijacking began after the plane stopped in Pereira, perpetrated by two former football players from Paraguay who initially claimed affiliation with the National Liberation Army (ELN). Armed and presenting varying demands, they initially sought to negotiate with the Colombian government for the release of all passengers and crew in exchange for a substantial ransom and the release of certain ELN members, expressing a desire to flee to Cuba. However, the government doubted their ELN membership, refusing direct negotiations with the hijackers. Consequently, the hijackers negotiated with the airline instead. After forcing the plane to land at Queen Beatrix International Airport in Aruba, where they released some passengers but failed to secure money, they directed the pilot to head to Jorge Chávez International Airport in Lima, Peru. A technical issue forced a return to Aruba, during which some passengers escaped due to the hijackers' oversight. Eventually, they reached Lima, where they negotiated for fuel and new pilots. The hijackers then decided to make stops in several South American cities: Guayaquil, Mendoza, Buenos Aires, Resistencia, and finally Asunción, Paraguay, where the hijacking ended after more than 60 hours.

The hijackers, Eusebio Borja and Francisco "Toro" Solano López, confessed to the crew that their sole motivation was financial. As the hijacking progressed, they sought notoriety and aimed to set a record for its duration. Borja disembarked at Resistencia International Airport and evaded capture; he has not been seen since. Solano López was apprehended at Silvio Pettirossi International Airport by Paraguayan police and subsequently extradited to Colombia. Both men had lived in Colombia attempting to secure playing contracts with local football clubs but were unsuccessful.

== Popular culture ==
In 2024, Netflix released a drama series named The Hijacking of Flight 601. a Colombian production inspired by the events. The series is based on a book by the Italian writer Massimo Di Ricco named Los condenados del aire.
