= De Havilland Heron =

Small propeller-driven 1950 British airliner

DH.114 Heron
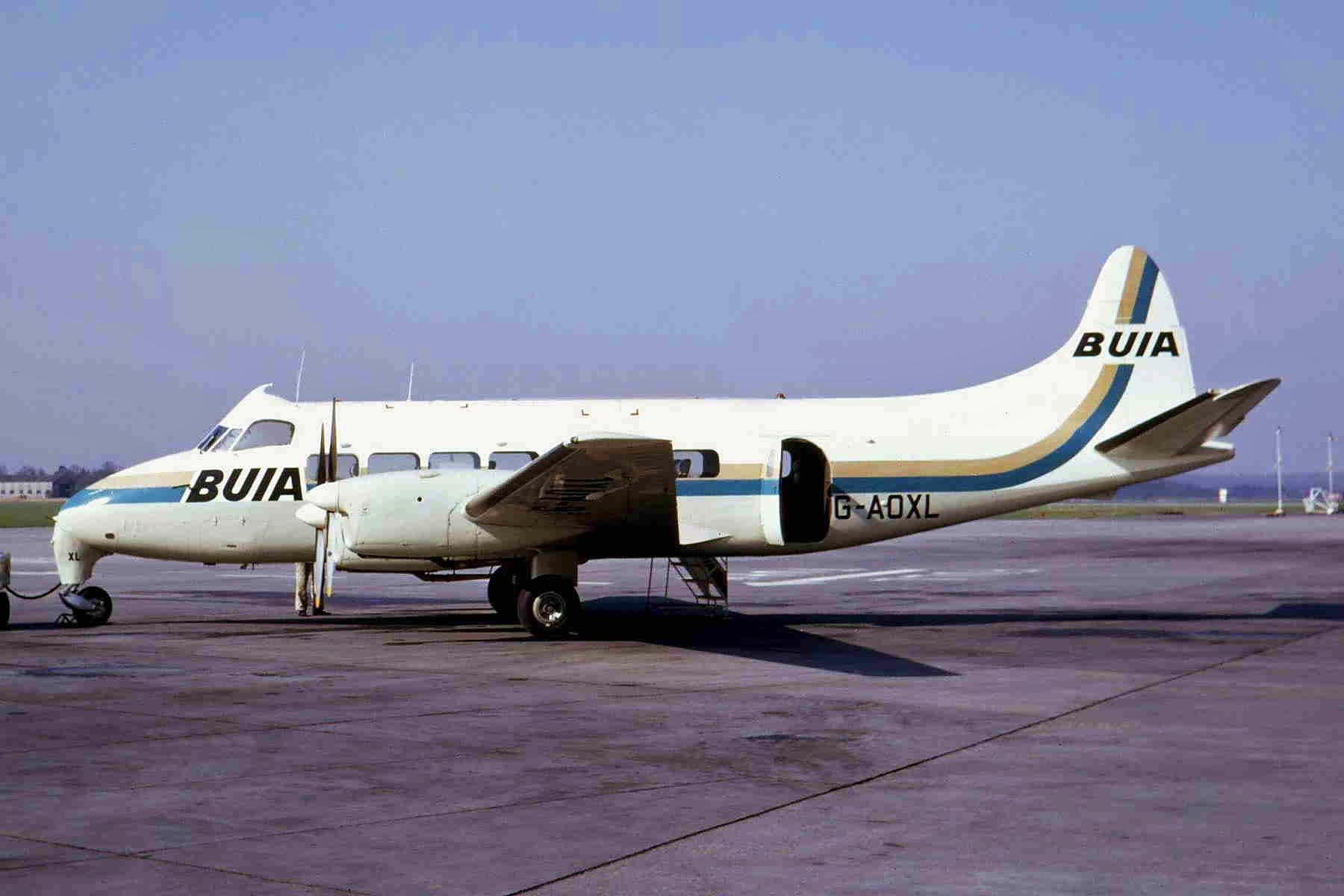
- De Havilland DH.114 Heron 1 of British United Island Airways at London Gatwick Airport in April 1969

General information
- Type: Airliner
- National origin: United Kingdom
- Manufacturer: de Havilland
- Status: Retired
- Primary users: Garuda Indonesian Airways See Operators
- Number built: 149

History
- Introduction date: 1950
- First flight: 10 May 1950
- Developed from: de Havilland Dove
- Variant: Saunders ST-27

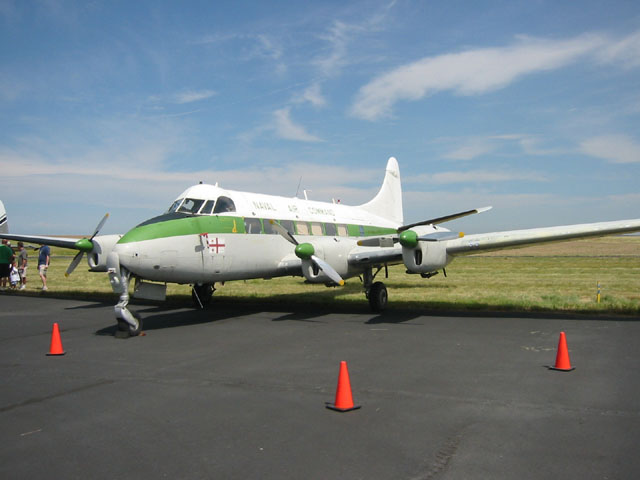
DH.114 Heron 2 restored in the United States

The de Havilland DH.114 Heron is a small propeller-driven British airliner that first flew on 10 May 1950. It was a development of the twin-engine de Havilland Dove, with a stretched fuselage and two more engines. It was designed as a rugged, conventional low-wing monoplane with tricycle undercarriage that could be used on regional and commuter routes. A total of 149 were built; it was also exported to about 30 countries. Herons later formed the basis for various conversions, such as the Riley Turbo Skyliner and the Saunders ST-27 and ST-28.

== Design and development ==
In the closing stages of the Second World War, the aircraft manufacturer de Havilland began development of a new small twin-engined passenger aircraft, the DH 104 Dove, intended as a replacement for the earlier Dragon Rapide and which soon proved to be successful. As a further development, the company basically enlarged the Dove; the fuselage was lengthened to make room for more passengers or freight, and the wingspan was increased to make room for two more engines. The Heron was of all-metal construction, and was laid out as a conventional design; the resulting aircraft could use many of the parts originally designed for the Dove, thus simplifying logistics for airlines using both types.

The emphasis was on rugged simplicity to produce an economical aircraft for short- to medium-stage routes in isolated and remote areas which did not possess modern airports. The Heron was designed with a fixed undercarriage and Gipsy Queen 30 engines, which lacked potentially unreliable reduction gearboxes and superchargers.

The Heron prototype registered to the de Havilland Aircraft Company, Hatfield, UK, as G-ALZL undertook its first flight with Geoffrey Pike at the controls on 10 May 1950. The aircraft was unpainted at the time, and after 100 hours of testing was introduced to the public on 8 September 1950 at the Farnborough Airshow, still in its polished metal state. By November, the prototype had received its formal British Certificate of Airworthiness and had flown to Khartoum and Nairobi for tropical trials.

The prototype was then painted and fitted out as a company demonstrator, and was tried by British European Airways in 1951 on its Scottish routes. Following the successful completion of the prototype trials as a regional airliner, series production of the Heron began. The first deliveries were to NAC, the New Zealand National Airways Corporation (later part of Air New Zealand).

Basic price for a new Heron in 1960 was around £60,000, minus radio.

== Operational service ==
The first Heron, Series 1A suffered deficiencies, as NAC soon discovered. First, the aircraft was generally underpowered. Its quite heavy engines (weighing about 490 pounds (220 kg) each), had an output of only 250 hp (190 kW) each. By comparison, later modifications or rebuilt aircraft had as much as 50% more power (in the case of the Saunders ST-27). Unlike the Dove, the Heron came with a fixed undercarriage and no nosewheel steering, which simplified maintenance, but reduced top speed. Secondly, the lightweight aluminium alloy wingspars were prone to constant cracking due to the heavy loading on the wing caused by the overweight engines and rough landings on unpaved runways. NAC resolved this by replacing the aluminium spars with heavier steel spars, reducing the performance of the Heron Series 1A (re-classified 1B) to uneconomic levels for the services required of them in New Zealand. NAC disposed of them in 1957.

After 51 Series 1 aircraft had been built, production switched to the Series 2, featuring retractable landing gear, which reduced drag and fuel consumption, and increased the top speed marginally. The 2A was the equivalent of the 1A, the basic passenger aircraft while the 1B and its successor the 2B had higher maximum takeoff weight, the 2C featured fully feathering propellers, the Heron 2D had an even higher maximum takeoff weight, while the Heron 2E was a VIP version.

In service, the Heron was generally well received by flight crews and passengers who appreciated the additional safety factor of the four engines. At a time when smaller airliners were still rare in isolated and remote regions, the DH.114 could provide reliable and comfortable service with seating for 17 passengers, in individual seats on either side of the aisle.

With its larger fuselage, passengers could stand up whilst moving down the aisle and large windows were also provided. Baggage was stored in an aft compartment with an additional smaller area in the nose. A few peculiarities appeared; passengers who filled the aft rows first would find that the Heron gently "sat down" on its rear skid. Pilots and ground crews soon added a tail brace to prevent the aircraft from sitting awkwardly on its tail.

Performance throughout the Heron range was relatively "leisurely", and after production at de Havilland's Chester factory ceased in 1963, several companies, most notably Riley Aircraft Corporation, offered various Heron modification kits, mainly related to replacing the engines, which greatly enhanced takeoff and top speed capabilities. Riley Aircraft replaced the Gipsy Queens with horizontally opposed Lycoming IO-540 engines.

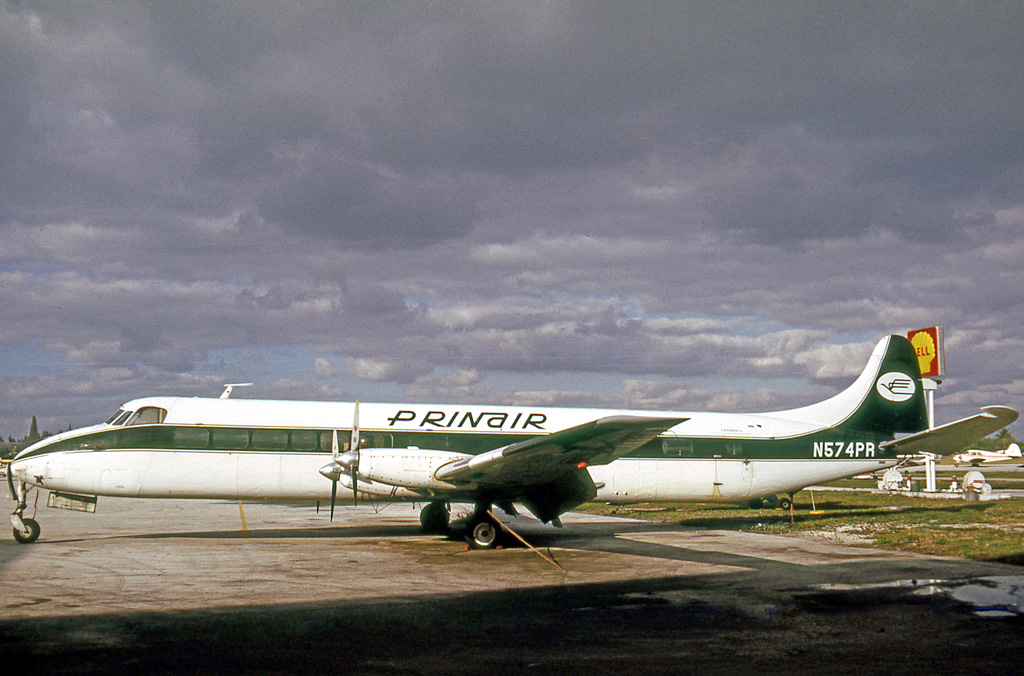
Prinair Heron with greatly lengthened fuselage (17 feet or 5.2 metres) and fitted with Continental 520 engines

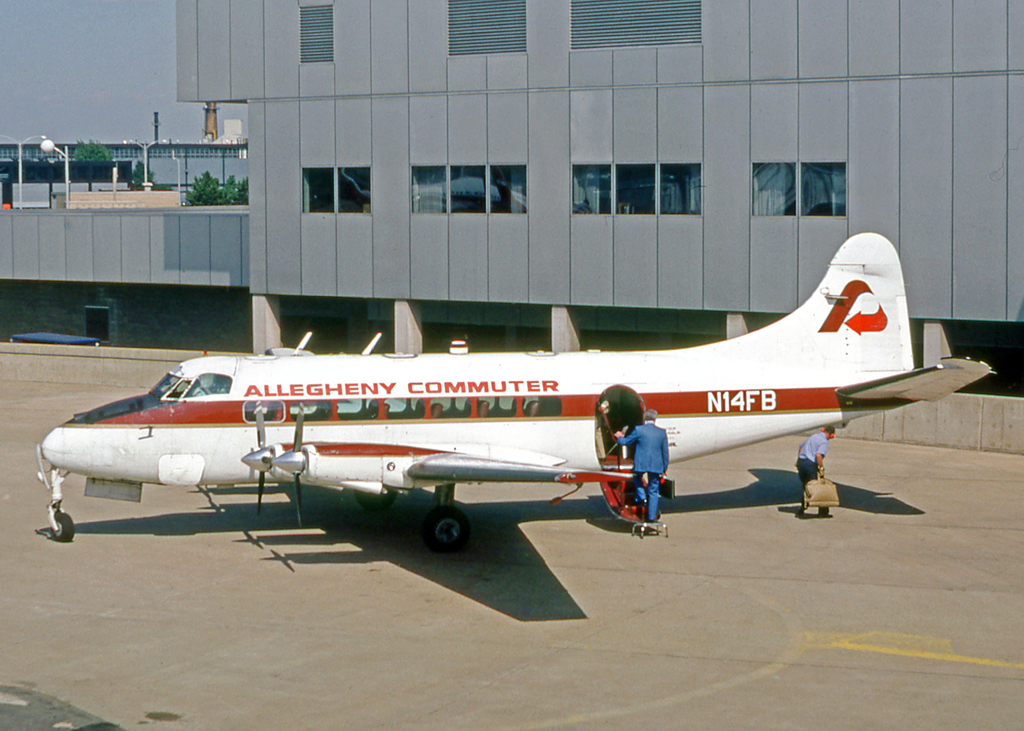
DH Riley Heron fitted with Lycoming engines at Cleveland Airport Ohio in 1982. It was operated by Fischer Brothers as Allegheny Commuter service for Allegheny Airlines.

One U.S. airline that carried out Riley-type conversions at their Opa Locka Airport, Florida, engineering facility was Prinair, of Puerto Rico, which replaced the Gipsy Queens with Continental IO-520 engines. Prinair also considerably stretched Heron 2 N574PR to allow extra passengers to be carried.

Connellan Airways also converted its Herons, using Riley kits. When available aircraft reached the end of their service lives, the engine conversions gave the elderly airliner a new lease of life as a number of examples were converted in the 1970s and 1980s including N415SA, a Riley Heron still flying in Sweden as of 20 May 2012 and a Riley Turbo Skyliner, tail number N600PR currently registered in the United States (this example appeared in the 1986 movie Club Paradise).

The most radical modification of the basic Heron airframe was the Saunders ST-27/-28, that changed the configuration as well as the "look" of the whole aircraft with two powerful turboprop engines replacing the lethargic four-engine arrangement, a stretched fuselage, the shape of the windows changed and the wingtips squared instead of rounded.

== Variants ==
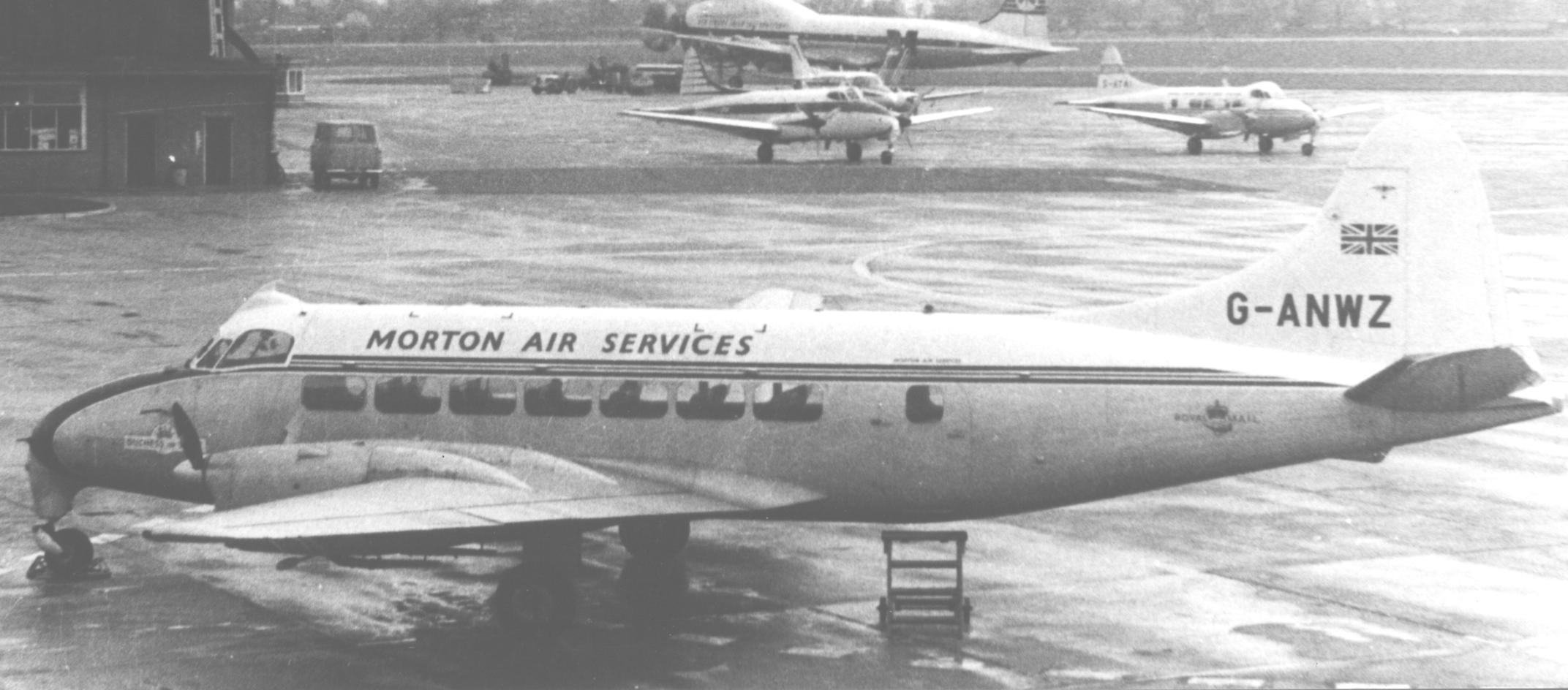
DH.114 Heron 1B of Morton Air Services in 1965. Note fixed undercarriage of this version

- Heron 1: Four-engined light transport aircraft. Fitted with fixed landing gear.
  - Heron 1B: This model had an increased takeoff weight of 13,000 pounds (5,900 kg).
- Heron 2: Four-engined light transport aircraft. Fitted with retractable landing gear.
  - Heron 2A: This designation was given to a single Heron 2, which was sold to a civil customer in the US.
  - Heron 2B: This model had the same increased takeoff weight as the Heron 1B.
  - Heron 2C: Redesignation of the Heron 2Bs, which could be fitted with optional fully feathering propellers.
  - Heron 2D: Four-engined light transport aircraft. This model had an increased takeoff weight of 13,500 pounds (6,120 kg).
  - Heron 2E: VIP transport aircraft. One custom-built aircraft.
- Heron C.Mk 3: VIP transport version for the Queen's Flight, Royal Air Force (RAF). Two built.
- Heron C.Mk 4: VIP transport aircraft for Queen's Flight, RAF. One built.
- Sea Heron C.Mk 20: Transport and communications aircraft for the Royal Navy. Three ex-civil Heron 2s and two Heron 2Bs were acquired by the Royal Navy in 1961.
- Riley Turbo Skyliner: Re-engined aircraft. A number of Herons were fitted with 290 hp (216 kW) Lycoming IO-540 flat-six piston engines. The modifications were carried out by the Riley Turbostream Corporation of the USA.

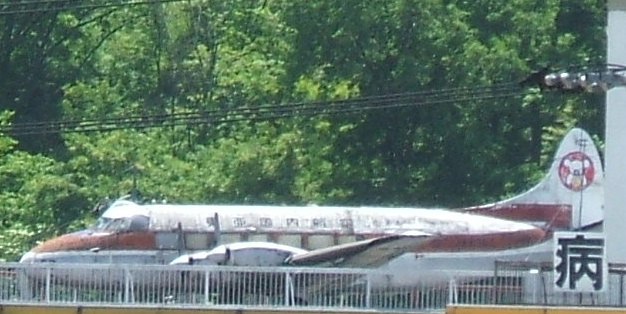
Japanese custom model DH.114 Tawron

- Saunders ST-27: The fuselage was lengthened by 8 ft 6 in (2.59 m), to accommodate up to 23 passengers. It was powered by two 750 shp (560 kW) Pratt & Whitney Canada PT6A-34 turboprop engines. Twelve Herons were modified by the Saunders Aircraft Corporation of Gimli, Manitoba, Canada.
  - Saunders ST-27A and Saunders ST-27B: The original designations of the ST-28.
  - Saunders ST-28: Improved version of the ST-27. One prototype built.
- Shin Meiwa Tawron: Conversion by Shin Meiwa of Japan for Toa AirWays (TAW) with 260 hp (194 kW) Continental IO-470 engines replacing the originals. Its name means "TAW"+He"ron".

A De Havilland Heron, registration G-AOXL, is preserved on stilts outside Airport House (which incorporated the Croydon Aerodrome control tower) on Purley Way, Croydon, Greater London

== Operators ==
=== Military operators ===
- Belgium
- Biafra
- (Sri Lanka) Ceylon
- Germany
- Ghana
- Iraq
- Jordan
- (State of Katanga) Katanga
- Kenya
- Kuwait
- Morocco
- Malaysia
- South Africa
- United Kingdom

=== Civil operators ===
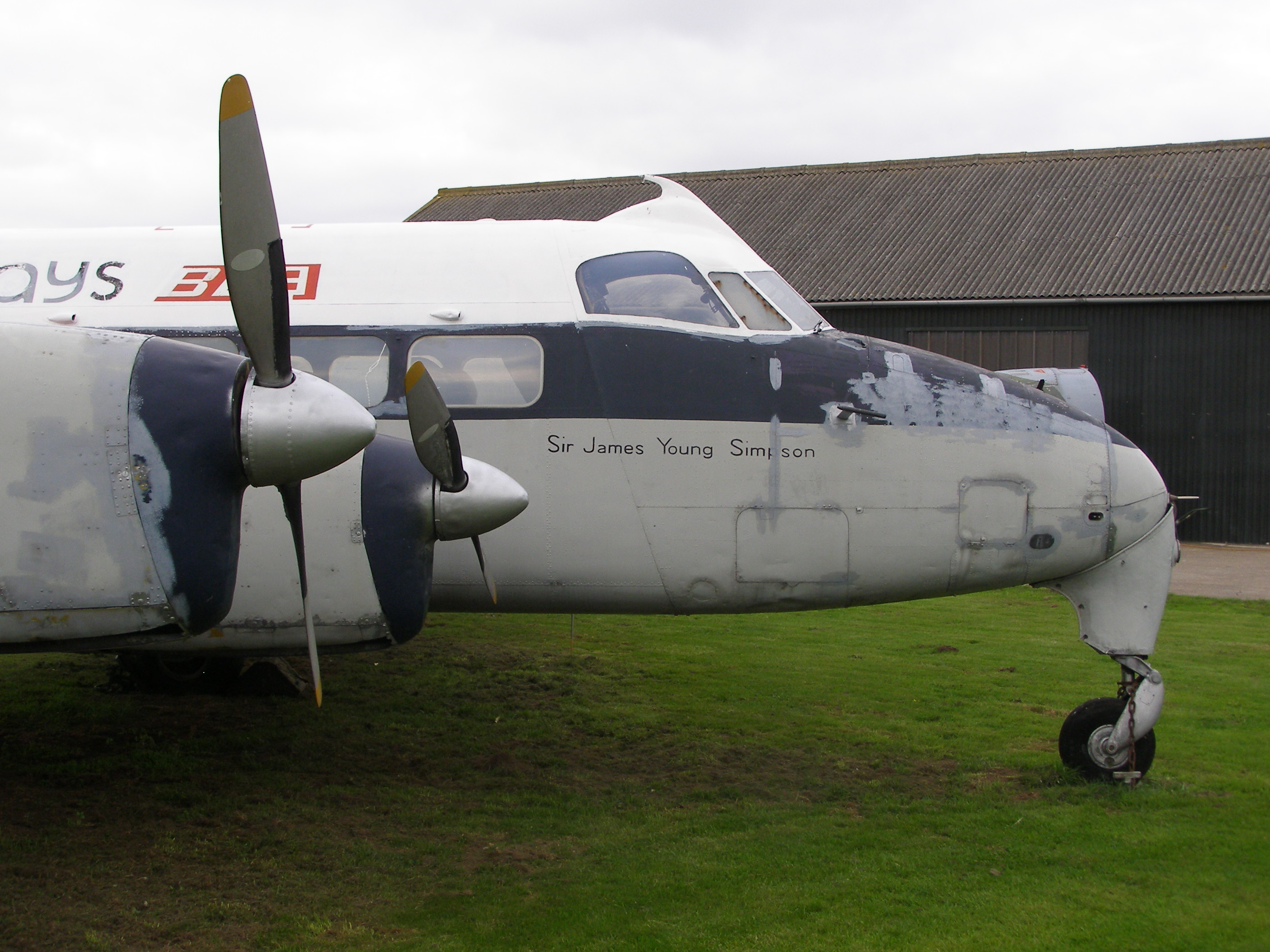
Heron 1B at the Newark Air Museum

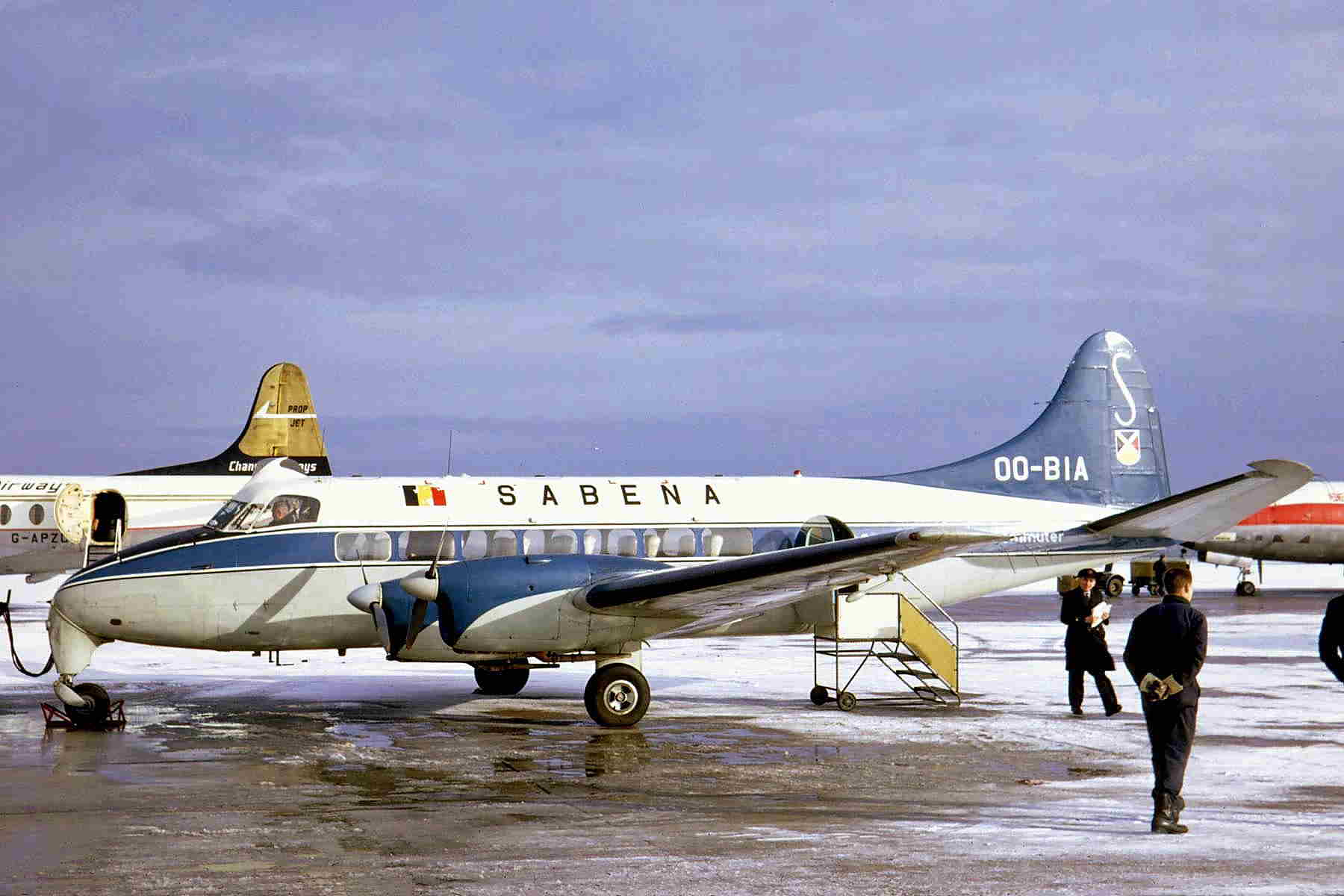
Heron 1 of Sabena

- Australia
- Bahrain
- Gulf Aviation
- Belgium
- Brazil
- Canada
- Ivory Coast
- Colombia
- Denmark
- Fiji
- France
- Germany
- Honduras
- India
- Indonesia
- Israel
- Italy
- Jamaica
- Japan
- Netherlands
- New Zealand
- Nigeria
- Norway
- Oman
- Portugal
- Puerto Rico
- Rhodesia
- São Tomé and Príncipe
- Saint Lucia
- Sierra Leone
- Thailand
- Turkey
- United Kingdom
- United States
- Uruguay

== Accidents and incidents ==
- On 18 April 1955, Union Aéromaritime de Transport F-BGOI, crashed into Kupe Mountain, Cameroon. 12 out of 14 passengers and crew died in the crash.
- On 7 November 1956, Braathens SAFE LN-SUR, crash-landed in heavy snow on the mountain Hummelfjell in Tolga Municipality, Norway. The pilot and one passenger were killed, whilst the remaining crew and passengers survived. The Hummelfjell accident was Braathens SAFE's first fatal accident. The probable cause was unusually heavy icing.
- On 28 September 1957, British European Airways G-AOFY, on an air ambulance flight, crashed on approach to Glenegedale Airport, Islay, in bad weather. The three occupants, two crew and one nurse, were killed. The pilot did not appreciate that the aircraft had rapidly lost height whilst he was making a visual half circuit to land.
- On 15 November 1957, Aviaco EC-ANZ crashed into a mountain close to the airport at Son Bonet Aerodrome in bad weather after the pilot made a navigation error at the end of a flight from Barcelona Airport. All six people on board were killed.
- On 19 February 1958, Gulf Aviation G-APJS, on a ferry flight from Bahrain to England via Athens International Airport, crashed into a mountain near Rome after a navigational error, killing all three people on board.
- On 14 April 1958, Aviaco EC-ANJ, crashed into the sea off the coast of Barcelona Spain after it was forced to make a sudden avoidance manoeuvre to prevent a mid-air collision. All 16 passengers and crew were killed in the crash.
- On 10 December 1958, a DH.114 1B registered as PK-GHP was written off at Jakarta.
- On 14 October 1960, Itavia Flight 115 crashed on Mount Capanne, Italy killing all 11 on board. Bad weather may have played a role in the accident.
- On 17 August 1963, Fujita Airlines JA6159 crashed just after takeoff into Mount Hachijō-Fuji, Hachijōjima, Japan; the accident killed all 19 passengers and crew in the worst disaster suffered by the de Havilland Heron.
- On 27 January 1968, Air Comoros F-OCED flight hit the runway at Moroni, Comoros and overran the runway then crashed into the sea. 15 passengers and crew died but one person survived the accident.
- On 5 March 1969, Prinair Flight 277 from Charlotte-Amalie, United States Virgin Islands to San Juan, Puerto Rico crashed into a mountain in the Fajardo, Puerto Rico area, killing all 19 on board.
- On 26 May 1970, Aero Servicios HR-ASN stalled in turbulent conditions on approach to Toncontín International Airport, killing all six people on board.
- On 24 June 1972, Prinair Flight 191 crashed near Ponce, Puerto Rico while trying to land, killing five people out of 20 passengers and crew. The cause was pilot error.
- On 23 October 1975, VH-CLS performing Connair Flight CK1263 crashed in a cane field at Holloways Beach after a missed approach to Cairns Airport, Queensland, Australia during a storm. The three crew and eight passengers were all killed.
- On 24 July 1979 PrinAir crashed on takeoff from Saint Croix-Alexander Hamilton Airport (STX) killing 8 of the 21 onboard including both pilots. The crash was attributed to the aircraft being 1060 pounds over max takeoff weight and significantly out of the rear CG limit. It was reported that the ground crew did not provide proper information to the crew for weight and balance purposes. It was also reported the aircraft was observed with the front nose bouncing up and down off the ground as the aircraft taxied for takeoff.
- On 27 December 1986, DQ-FEF operated by the Fijian airline Sunflower Airlines crashed short of runway 21 of Nadi International Airport after its right flaps jammed in flight. 11 of the 14 people on board were killed.

== Specifications (Heron 2D) ==
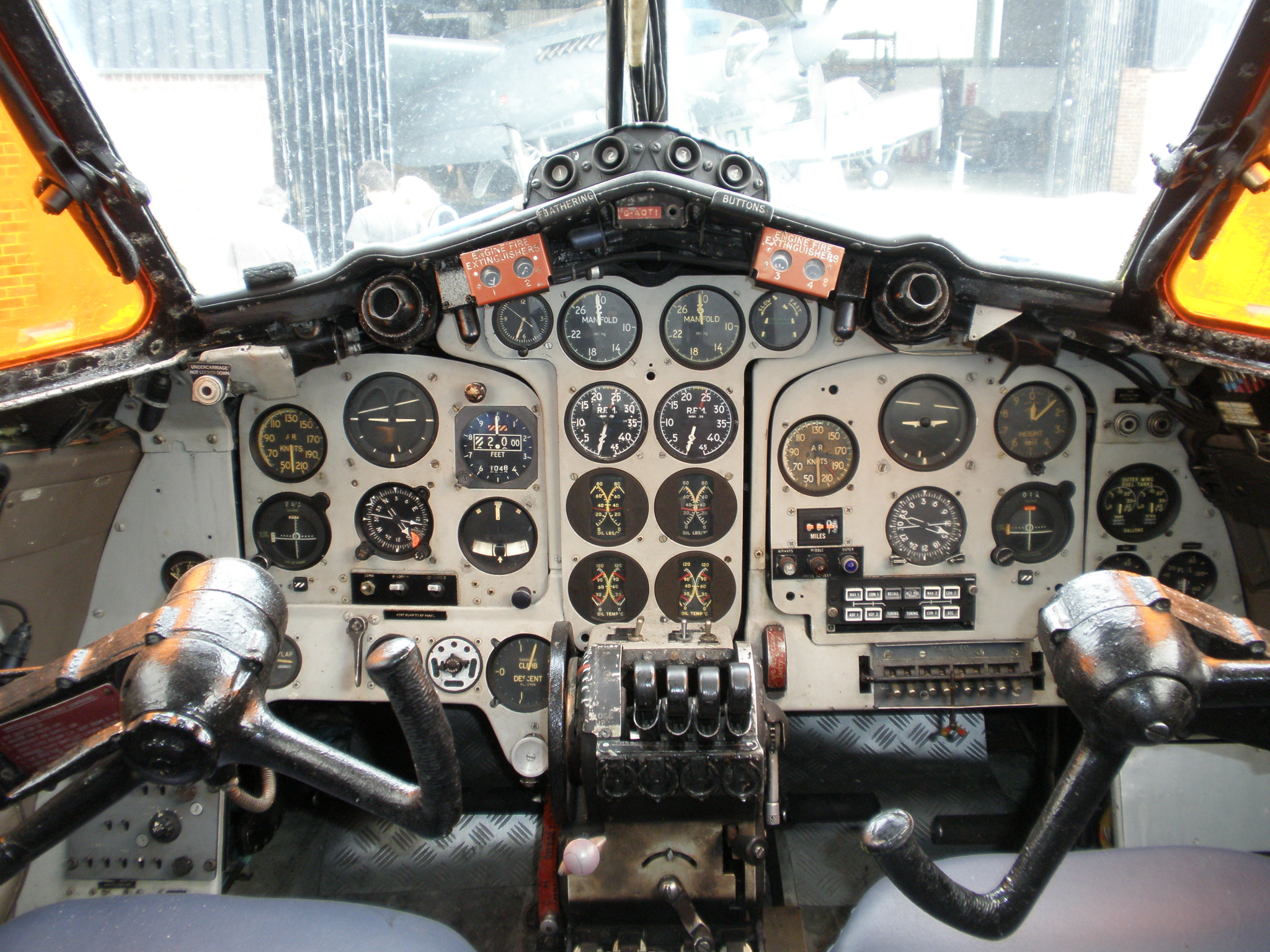
De Havilland Heron instrument panel

Data from De Havilland Aircraft since 1909

General characteristics

- Crew: Two
- Capacity: 14 passengers
- Length: 48 ft 6 in (14.78 m)
- Wingspan: 71 ft 6 in (21.79 m)
- Height: 15 ft 7 in (4.75 m)
- Wing area: 499 sq ft (46.4 m^{2})
- Empty weight: 8,150 lb (3,697 kg)
- Max takeoff weight: 13,500 lb (6,123 kg)
- Fuel capacity: 412 imp gal (495 US gal; 1,870 L)
- Powerplant: 4 × de Havilland Gipsy Queen 30 Mk.2 6-cylinder inverted inline air-cooled piston engine, 250 hp (190 kW) each
- Propellers: 2-bladed D.H. 2/1000/2 constant-speed propellers, 7 ft 0 in (2.13 m) diameter

Performance

- Cruise speed: 183 mph (295 km/h, 159 kn)
- Range: 915 mi (1,473 km, 795 nmi)
- Service ceiling: 18,500 ft (5,600 m)
- Rate of climb: 1,140 ft/min (5.8 m/s)
- Takeoff distance to 50 ft (15 m): 2,425 ft (739 m)
- Landing distance from 50 ft (15 m): 2,065 ft (629 m)

== See also ==
Related development

- de Havilland Dove

Aircraft of comparable role, configuration, and era

- Beechcraft Model 34
- Cessna 620
- Potez 840
- PZL MD-12
