= Braathens ASA =

Airline of Norway (1946–2004)

Braathens
IATA	ICAO	Call sign
BU	BRA	BRAATHENS
- Founded: 26 March 1946
- Commenced operations: 30 January 1947
- Ceased operations: 1 May 2004 (rebranded as SAS Braathens)
- Hubs: Oslo–Fornebu (1949–1998); Oslo–Gardermoen (1947–1949; 1998–2004); Stockholm–Arlanda (1997–1999)
- Frequent-flyer program: Wings
- Alliance: KLM–Northwest (1997–2001)
- Fleet size: 26 (2004)
- Destinations: 19 (2004)
- Parent company: Branganza (1946–1994); SAS Group (2001–2004)
- Headquarters: Diamanten, Fornebu, Bærum, Norway
- Key people: Bjørn G. Braathen (CEO, 1976–1989); Erik G. Braathen (CEO, 1989–1999); Arne A. Jensen (CEO, 1999–2001)
- Founder: Ludvig G. Braathen (CEO, 1946–1976)
- Website: www.braathens.no

Braathens ASA, until 1997 Braathens South American & Far East Airtransport A/S and trading as Braathens SAFE, was a Norwegian airline which operated from 1946 until it merged with Scandinavian Airlines (SAS) in 2004 to become SAS Braathens. For most of its history, Braathens was the largest domestic airline in Norway, but did not operate an international network for many years. Its main hubs were Oslo Airport, Fornebu and later Oslo Airport, Gardermoen, and briefly Stockholm-Arlanda Airport. The airline operated 118 aircraft of 15 models, mostly Boeing 737 variants. Braathens served 53 airports and 50 cities with scheduled services through its history.

The airline was founded in 1946 by Ludvig G. Braathen and originally used a fleet of Douglas DC-4 aircraft on routes to the Far East and South Africa. From 1954 the airline was forced to operate all its scheduled flights domestically, where it used de Havilland Herons. Braathens SAFE retained an international charter service using the DC-3 and DC-6. As new domestic airports were built, Braathens SAFE and SAS were awarded each their share of monopoly route concessions. The Fokker F-27 was introduced in 1958, but was phased out with the delivery of the Fokker F-28 and Boeing 737-200 jets from 1969. The last F-27 was phased out in 1975. After a two-year use of Boeing 767 aircraft, Braathens operated an all-Boeing 737 fleet from 1986.

Increased domestic competition on routes started from 1987, along with Braathens SAFE again starting international routes. By 1994 the fleet had been replaced with Boeing 737-400 and -500 and domestic deregulation of the airline market was introduced. Braathens followed up by listing itself on the Oslo Stock Exchange, joining an alliance with Dutch airline KLM and expanding its operations to Sweden through purchasing Transwede and Malmö Aviation. The 1998 opening of Gardermoen resulted in an intense price war with SAS and Color Air, from which Braathens never recovered financially. Braathens was controlled by Braganza until 2001, when it was sold to the SAS Group. Braathens merged with SAS Norway on 1 May 2004.

== History ==
=== Far East ===
Braathens South American & Far East Airtransport A/S was founded on 26 March 1946 by Ludvig G. Braathen through his shipping company Ludvig G. Braathens Rederi and its holding company Braganza. Braathens had made good money during World War II with the participation in the Norwegian Shipping and Trade Mission. His initial intentions were to fly crew and supplies to his and others ships throughout the world—primarily in the Far East. Braathen traveled to the United States, where he bought several used 44-passenger Douglas C-54 (DC-4) aircraft from the United States Air Force. Twenty pilots were recruited and sent to Fort Worth for certification. The first plane, LN-HAV Norse Explorer, landed at Oslo Airport, Gardermoen on 26 December 1946.

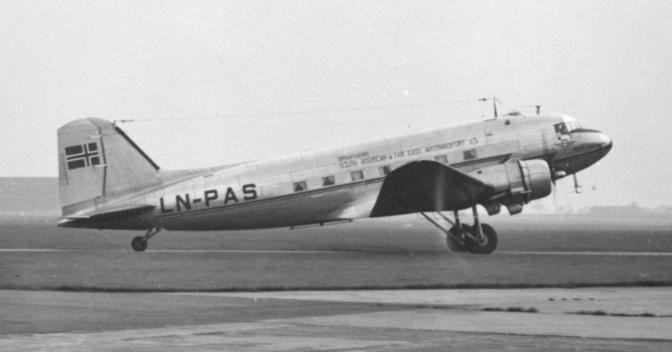
Braathens Douglas DC-3 in 1952 wearing the airline's full name

The first service run from Oslo to Cairo via Copenhagen and Paris on 30 January 1947. Various charter services were provided, such as evacuating French and British personnel prior to the creation of Israel. The first Braathens SAFE flight was to the Far East started on 24 February from Oslo, with landings at Amsterdam, Marseille, Cairo, Basra, Karachi, Calcutta and Bangkok before Hong Kong, where Norske Skyfarer landed on 8 March. Total flight time was 46 hours. The only other services to the Far East from Europe were operated by KLM and British Overseas Airways Corporation. The regular services could be done with a round trip time of nine to ten days, including overnighting in Cairo, Karachi and Bangkok, and with technical revision of the plane in Hong Kong. In 1947, Braathens SAFE flew twenty-five trips to Hong Kong, five to New York City and one to Johannesburg. Douglas DC-3 aircraft were introduced the same year for shorter charters. The following year, Braathens SAFE started the first trial flights to South America. By 1948 the airline had weekly trips to the Far East.

The partially state-owned Norwegian Air Lines (DNL) was granted a monopoly on all domestic and international flights during the late 1940s. They started the Scandinavian Airlines System (SAS) cooperation and stated that they would start a route to the Far East. Braathens SAFE's charters were by 1948 so regular that a concession would be needed. SAS demanded preferential treatment, but Braathens SAFE threatened to flag out and the government gave them a concession that lasted until 1954, on condition they establish a technical base at Stavanger Airport, Sola. The airline chose at the same time to move its main base from Gardermoen to Oslo Airport, Fornebu.

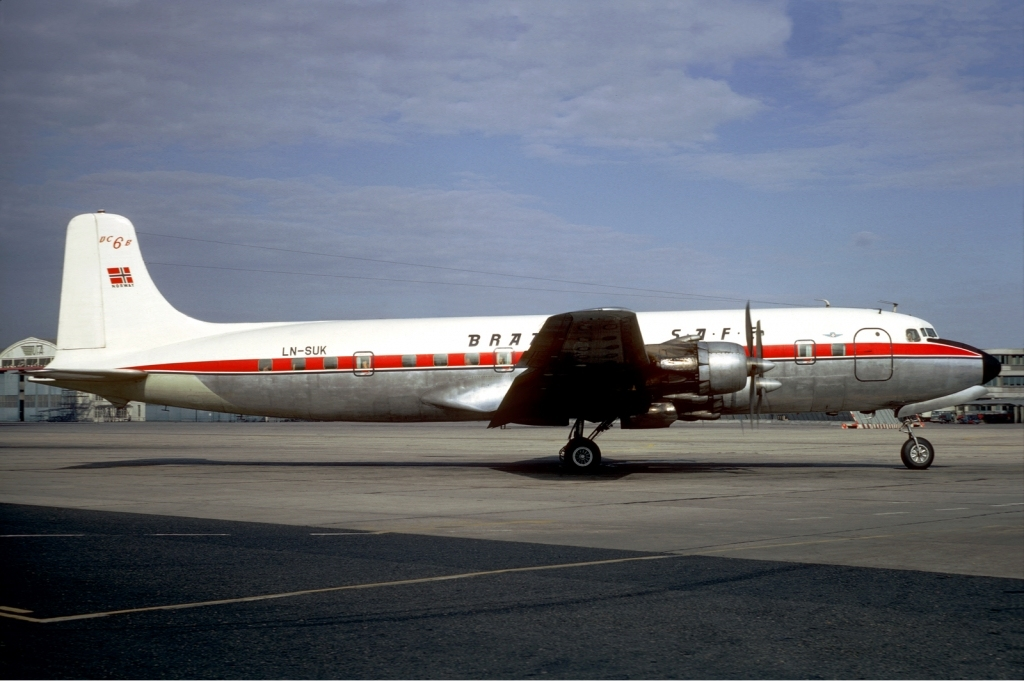
Douglas DC-6 in 1971

The SAS cooperation resulted in a full merger from 1951, after a merger proposal from Braathens SAFE had been rejected. Braathens SAFE made proposals to expand its routes to New York and Tokyo, but both were rejected by the government. The SAS merger bound the government to issue the Far East concession to SAS, and Braathens lost their international service rights then. Braathens SAFE started cooperating with Icelandic Loftleidir, who held the rights to fly to North America via Iceland. This involved Braathens leasing personnel and aircraft to Loftleidir and profit sharing on the route, in an agreement which lasted until 1961.

=== Domestic operations with Herons and Friendships ===
Charter flights to Europe using Douglas DC-6 aircraft started in 1950. The airline applied for and was granted permission to fly from Oslo via Tønsberg Airport, Jarlsberg to Stavanger. Braathens acquired de Havilland Heron aircraft to operate the route. Permission to fly from Oslo to Trondheim Airport, Lade was granted in 1953, a route also served by SAS. Termination of Far East routes led to a 90% drop in revenue and the airline made several unsuccessful applications for new routes. They were successful in obtaining permission include stopovers on Oslo–Stavanger services at Kristiansand Airport, Kjevik and Farsund Airport, Lista. From 1956 stopovers took place at Hamar Airport, Stafsberg and Notodden Airport, Tuven, but these only lasted until 1959. By then it had added Røros Airport to its destinations. Following the bankruptcy of West Norway Airlines in 1957 and the opening of Ålesund Airport, Vigra the following year, concessions were reshuffled, and Braathens was granted a monopoly on services to Ålesund and between Trondheim and Bergen, while it and SAS would compete on services between Oslo and Stavanger, Kristiansand and Trondheim.

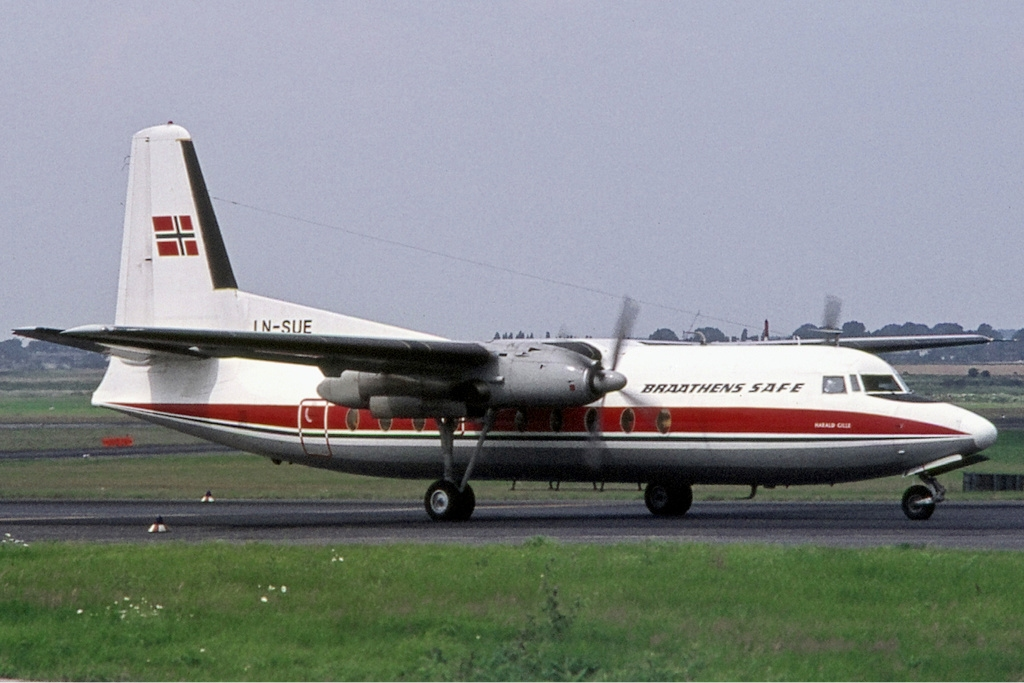
Fokker F-27 Friendship in 1974

Braathens SAFE was the second airline to take delivery of the Fokker F-27 Friendship. The Friendships, which replaced the DC-3 and Herons were turboprops with pressurized cabins. The first aircraft was delivered in 1958 and the model was put into service on the main routes. Service to Hamar, Farsund and Tønsberg stopped because their runways were too short. Braathens started charter flights to Longyearbyen in 1959, landing on an improvised snow runway. Scheduled service between Oslo via Sandefjord Airport, Torp to Aalborg Airport in Denmark was introduced in 1960. In 1967 Braathens SAFE was granted permission to continue their service between Bergen, Ålesund and Trondheim northwards to Bodø Airport and Tromsø Airport.

Saga Tours started selling Mediterranean charter trips in 1959 and Braathens SAFE operated the flights. At first the DC-4 was used, but from 1961 the airline used the 96-seat Douglas DC-6, reaching seven aircraft in 1967. Braathens bought strategic stakes in both Saga Tours and Sweden's Atlas Resor to secure their share of the charter market. Multilateral agreements allowed any Scandinavian airline to fly charter services from any of the three Scandinavian countries to Spain; while this allowed Braathens SAFE to enter the Swedish and Danish charter market, it increased competition on their home turf.

=== Entering the Jet Age ===
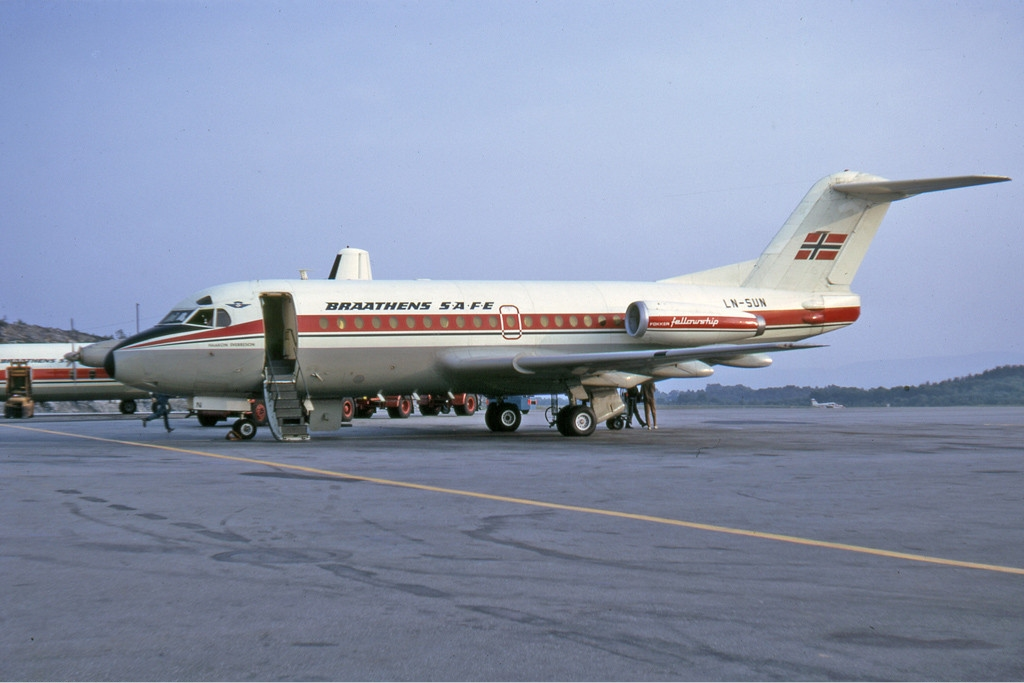
Fokker F-28-1000 Fellowship in 1972

Braathens SAFE ordered three Boeing 737-200 jets in 1965, which were intended to rationalize charter operations. The shorter -100 model was rejected in favor of becoming the launch customer of the Fokker F-28 Fellowship, which was planned as the new domestic workhorse. The move would see all the F-27 replaced with F-28. Both jet aircraft were delivered in 1969. This period also saw the gradual retirement of the DC-4 and DC-6.

Kristiansund Airport, Kvernberget opened in 1970 and Molde Airport, Årø in 1972, with Braathens SAFE granted permission to operate the routes. The airline also received permission to operate from Bergen via either Ålesund, Molde or Kristiansund to Bodø and Tromsø. Between 1975 and 1977, the last three F-27 were sold to sister airline Busy Bee, which took over some of the smallest services. "Green Routes" were introduced from 1976, which offered discounts on certain flights with strict conditions. Founder Ludvig G. Braathen died on 27 December 1976, while still acting as chief executive officer (CEO). He was replaced by his son Bjørn G. Braathen. During the 1970s, Braathens SAFE took delivery of eleven 737s, including one with a cargo door, and three with extended range which allowed for non-stop flights to the Canary Islands. Discounted "summer tickets" were introduced from the early 1980s which increased load factor.

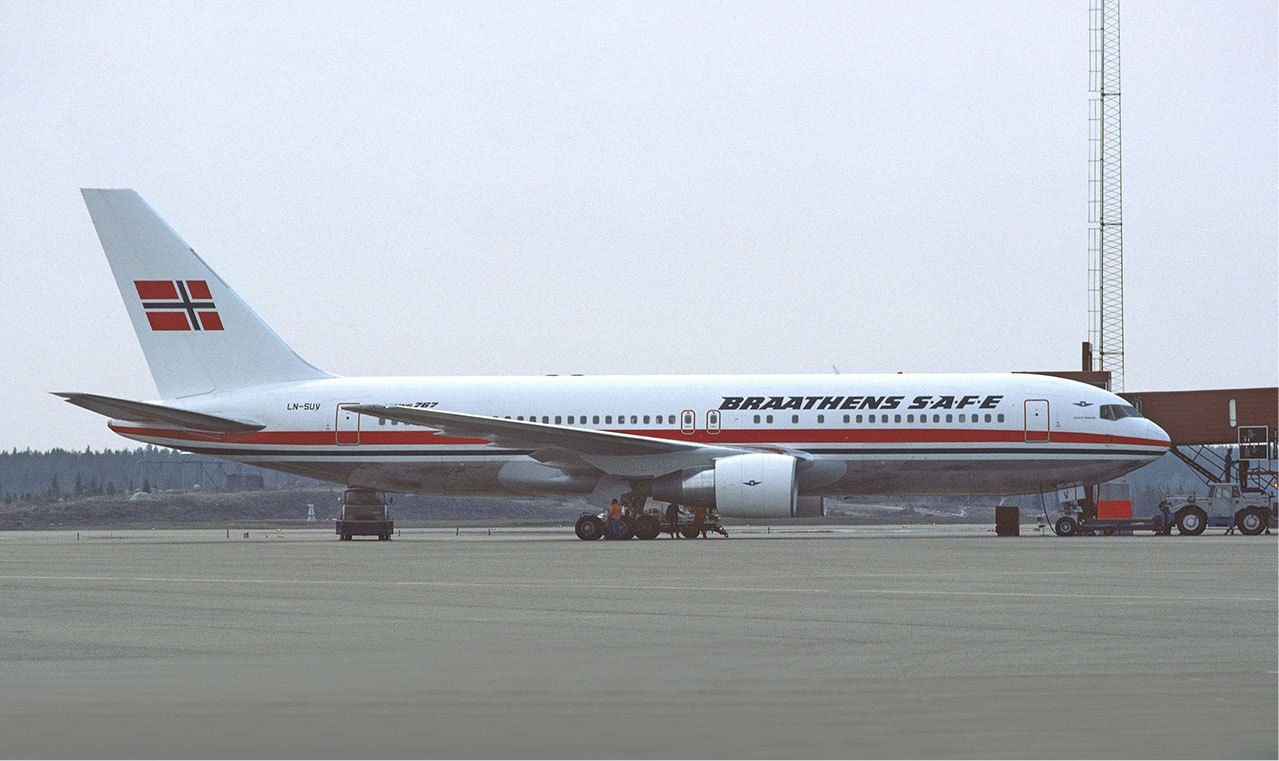
One of two Boeing 767-200 aircraft at Stockholm-Arlanda Airport

Braathens SAFE bought 15 percent of DNL in 1982 and applied for concessions for helicopter services from Stavanger to offshore oil platforms. This resulted in the incumbent, Helikopter Service, applying for all of Braathens SAFE's western Norway routes. Neither application was successful. Busy Bee was contracted in 1984 to connect Farsund, Haugesund Airport, Karmøy, Bergen and Stavanger, as well as operate from Sandefjord Airport, Torp.

In an attempt to remain competitive in the charter market from Oslo, Gothenburg and Stockholm, the airline ordered two Boeing 767-200 in 1980. They were configured with 242 seats, fewer than for most charter airlines, which typically had 273. The aircraft were delivered in 1984. Launched as "First Business Class" to charter travelers, the business model was unsuccessful as new customer groups had little willingness to pay. The company was faced with not being able to charter out the plane because of the lower number of seats, but could not put in the extra seats because the aircraft were also used for scheduled flights. As a result, the two aircraft were sold in 1986, and the airline's Swedish charter operations closed in 1988.

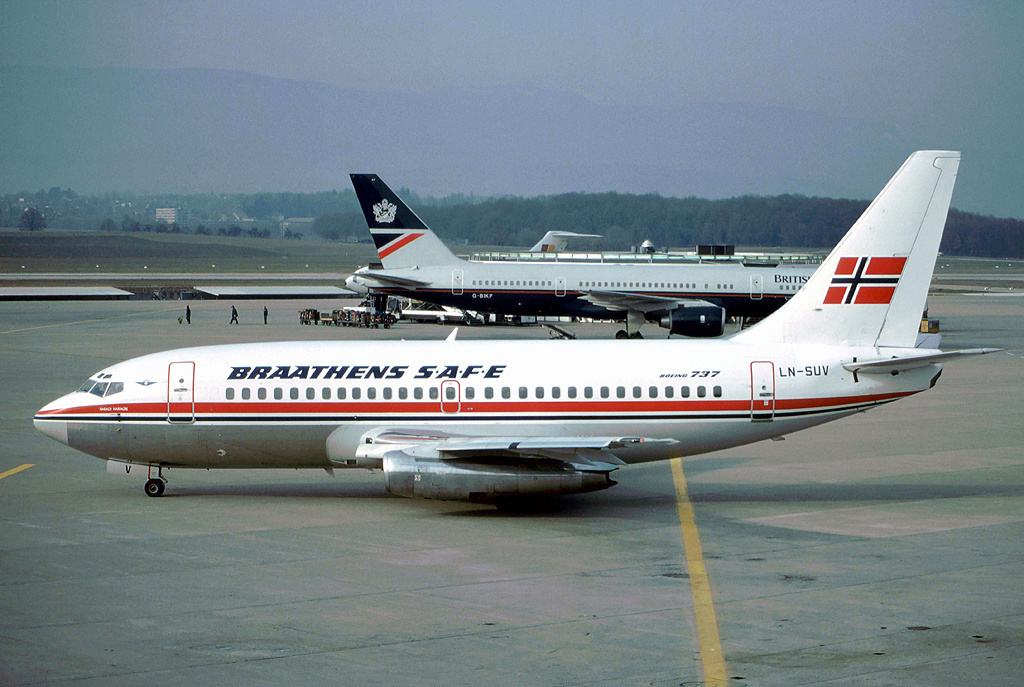
Boeing 737-200 in 1987

The four remaining F-28s were also sold in 1986, giving Braathens SAFE a unified 737-200 fleet, reducing operating costs. Six more 737-200 were delivered in 1986. On 1 June 1989, Erik G. Braathen, son of Bjørn G., took over as CEO at the age of 34. With the launch of the Boeing 737 Classic range, Braathens took delivery of the 156-seat 737-400 and the 124-seat 737-500, both featuring glass cockpits. The larger model was mostly used for charter services, while the smaller was mostly used in the domestic market. The first -400 was delivered in 1989 and the first -500 the following year. By 1994 all -200 had been retired.

=== Deregulation ===
The first stages towards deregulation started in 1987 with Braathens SAFE being permitted to compete with SAS on the Oslo–Bergen and Western Norway–Trondheim–Bodø–Tromsø route, plus once daily Oslo–Trondheim–Bodø, as well as Tromsø–Longyearbyen, in an attempt to increase domestic competition. From 1988, Braathens SAFE was granted a series of international route concessions. The first, to Billund, Denmark, started in 1989, and the second, to Newcastle, started the following year. A route to Malmö, Sweden, started in 1991 and on a week's notice in 1992, Braathens SAFE started flying to London Gatwick, after the bankruptcies of Norway Airlines and Dan-Air. Busy Bee went bankrupt in 1993 and their regional services were instead subcontracted to Norwegian Air Shuttle.

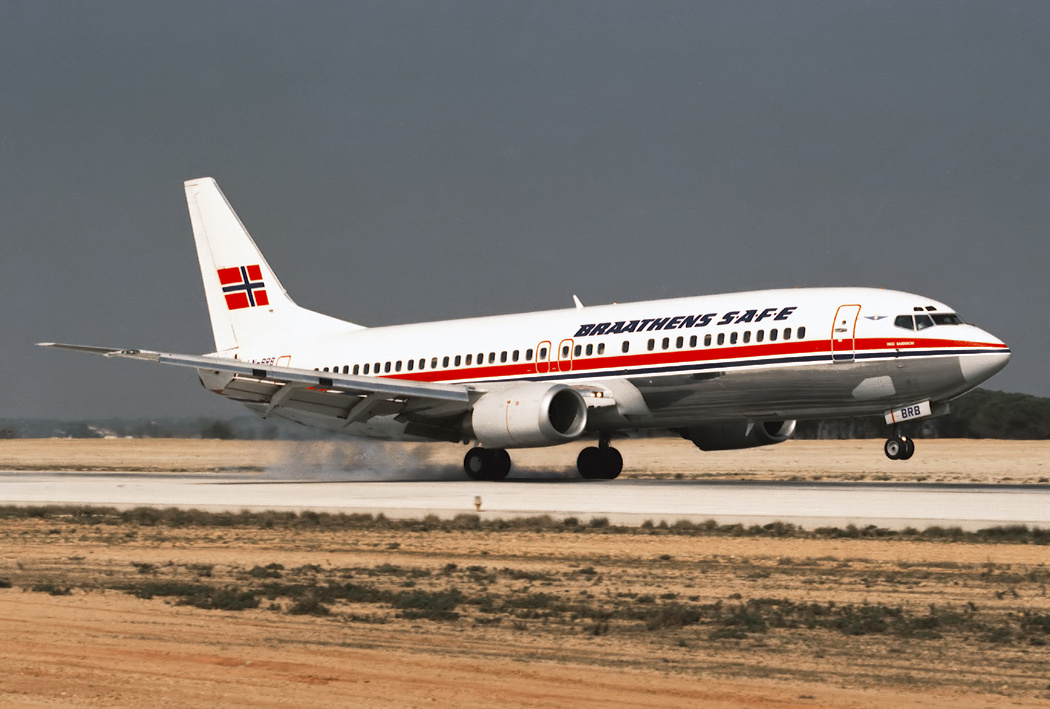
Boeing 737-400 in 1990

Braathens Helikopter was established by Braganza in 1989 after negotiating agreements with Norsk Hydro, Phillips Petroleum and Statoil to provide helicopter transport for their crews to their offshore oil installations Ekofisk, Oseberg, Gullfaks, Veslefrikk. This was the first time the incumbent Helikopter Service had received competition on their offshore helicopter services. Four 19-seet Aérospatiale Super Puma helicopters were ordered. Services started on 1 September 1990. In 1992 the helicopter airline signed an agreement to fly for BP to Ula and Gyda. Braathens Helikopter and Helikopter Service announced on 1 October 1993 that the two companies would merge from 1 January 1994.

The deregulation process, which would eliminate the need for concessions for routes, was driven by Norway's application for membership of the European Union. Since the airline's conception, Braathens SAFE had been a staunch opponent to the concession system and an avid proponent of free competition in the airline industry. With a deregulation around the corner, the airline changed stance and warned against the consequences of a free market. In contrast, SAS embraced the new system. Braathens SAFE's main concern was that their high debt incurred after the purchase of the new aircraft would make them illiquid in a price war. The airline started negotiating airline alliance with larger haulers, but turned both those and a merger proposal with SAS down. The Norwegian airline market was deregulated on 1 April 1994, as the third country in Europe.

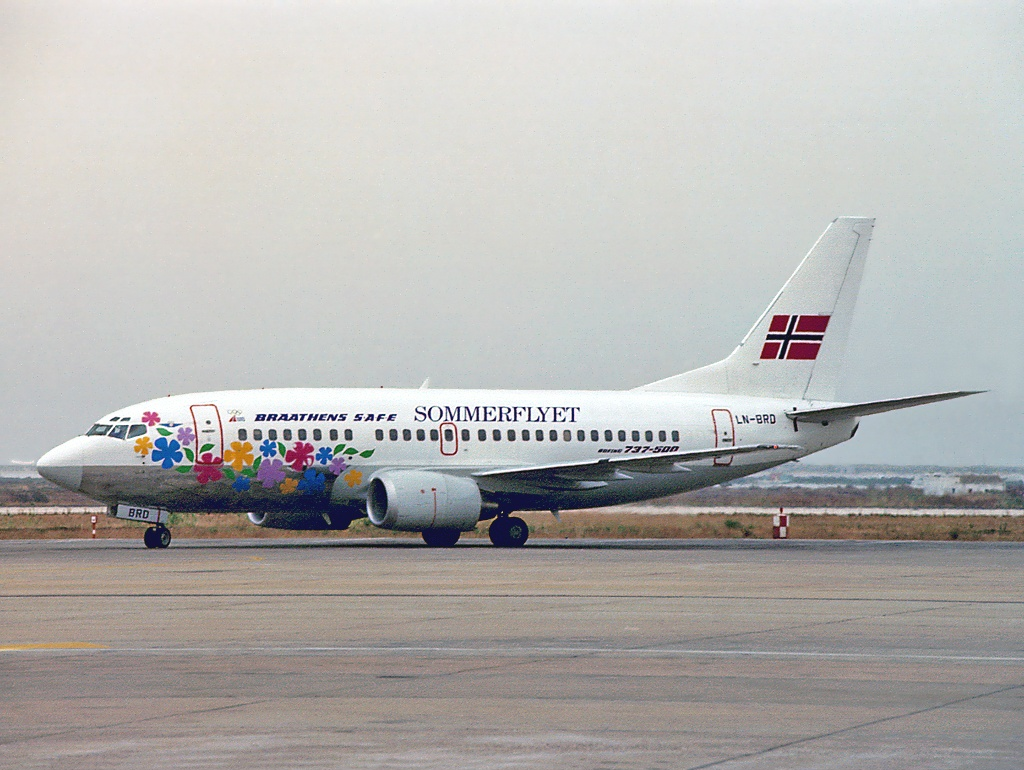
A Boeing 737-500 in a special summer livery

Both Braathens SAFE and SAS had been cross-subsidizing their routes as part of the concession agreements, and Braathens SAFE was losing money on the Haugesund–Bergen route and flights to Røros. A three-year wage agreement was reached with the trade unions to keep costs down, and the company raised additional capital in an initial public offering and subsequent listing on the Oslo Stock Exchange on 10 January 1994. After the listing, Braganza retained 69% of the company. On 1 April, service frequencies increased on the Oslo–Bergen route and the airline introduced direct flights from Oslo to Tromsø and Harstad/Narvik Airport, Evenes, later supplemented with direct services to Bodø. The following two years, Braathens SAFE also introduced scheduled international flights to Rome, as well as summer routes to Jersey and Nice. However, Braathens SAFE terminated their routes from Bergen to Bodø, Harstad/Narvik and Tromsø, making the passengers switch planes in Trondheim. Braathens signed agreements with many of Norway's large companies in 1995 in exchange for large discounts.

=== SAFE goes Back ===
The airline bought Transwede Airways in 1996, the second-largest domestic airline in Sweden. The goal was to integrate the networks, starting on 18 June with a new service between the two capital cities, one of SAS' most profitable. Braathens announced in 1997 the order of six 134-seat Boeing 737-700, while Transwede started replacing its Fokker 100s with 737s. Transwede changed its name to Braathens Sverige later that year.

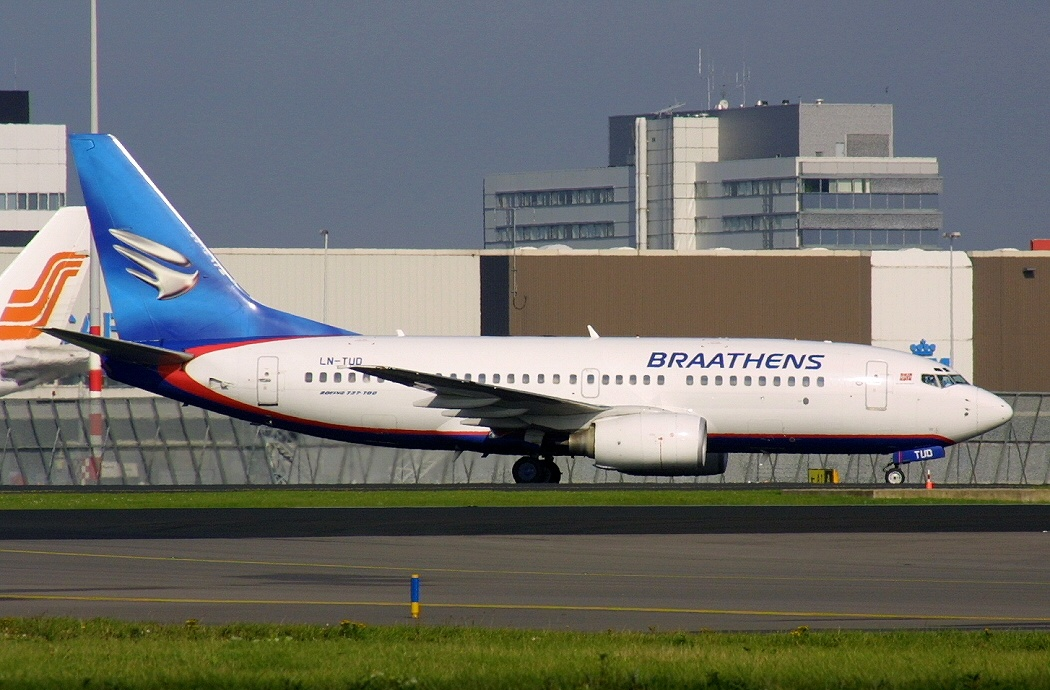
In 1997, Braathens changed its name and introduced a new livery, here seen on a Boeing 737-700

From 1998 Braathens SAFE started a strategic partnership with Dutch airline KLM, with KLM purchasing thirty percent of Braathens SAFE and Braathens SAFE taking over most of KLM's routes between Norway and Amsterdam. London services were moved to London Stansted Airport. The KLM agreement came as a response to SAS founding the Star Alliance along with among others Lufthansa.

On 23 March 1998, Braathens SAFE changed its name and corporate identity to Braathens. It introduced a new livery with a blue bottom, and replaced the Norwegian flag on the tail with an abstract, silver wing, that became the company's new logo. At the same time, a two-class configuration was introduced—Best and Back—with the latter being offered to discounted ticket-holders. SAS did not follow the same policy, and offered its discounted customers to travel in the same class as Braathens', including complimentary service. Braathens bought Malmö Aviation on 17 August 1998, which operated eleven British Aerospace 146 jets between Stockholm-Bromma Airport, Göteborg Landvetter Airport, Malmö Airport and London City Airport.

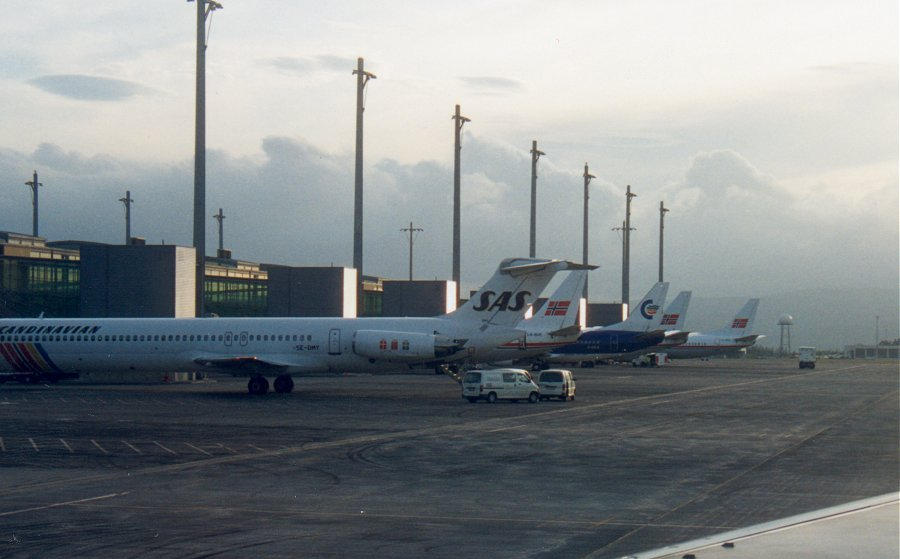
Scandinavian Airlines, Braathens and Color Air aircraft at Oslo Airport, Gardermoen during the price war in 1999

Color Air was established as a domestic low-cost airline by Olav Nils Sunde in January 1998. That year also saw the closing of Fornebu and the opening of Gardermoen as the new main airport, with the move taking place on 8 October. Color Air started flights from Gardermoen on 1 August. As Gardermoen did not have the landing slot limitations as the single-runway Fornebu, the three airline set off in a craze to establish new routes. In total, the three companies increased their daily round trip from 138 to 200, and the daily seat capacity from 18,000 to 26,000. Braathens introduced a new route to Haugesund, but saw competition from SAS to Kristiansand and from two airlines to Ålesund.

By the end of 1998, it became clear that Braathens had increased capacity with 20 percent, but only achieved a 5.2 percent ridership increase after the opening of Gardermoen. Similar numbers were applicable for SAS. In particular, the routes from Oslo to Ålesund and Kristiansand had a very low seat utilization; to Ålesund there were 1.2 million flown seats annually between the three airlines, but only 345,000 passengers. Color Air terminated all flights and ceased operations on 27 September 1999. Immediately following the bankruptcy, the two airlines increased their prices. In November, Braathens started to remove routes, and announced they would increase prices by 20 percent. They also reintroduced the Flag of Norway on the tail. Both Braathens and SAS lost more than 1 billion Norwegian krone (NOK) in 1999, totaling the cost of the price war between the three airlines to exceed NOK 3 billion.

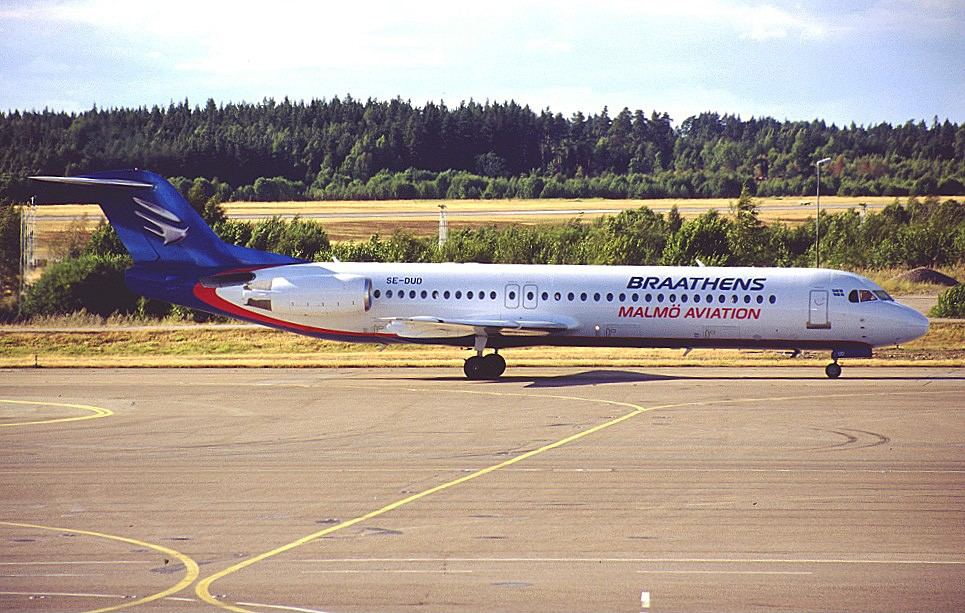
Ex-Transwede Fokker 100 in 1999

=== Fall and merger with SAS ===
Arne A. Jensen took over as CEO on 23 July 1999. In February 1999, Braathens merged the Swedish division with Malmö Aviation, to create Braathens Malmö Aviation. At the same time, the airline removed the 'Best' and 'Back' scheme on domestic Swedish flights. In November, Braathens terminated all services in Sweden that were inherited from Transwede. The following two years saw a large increase in ticket prices and a decrease of flights. Several domestic and international routes were cut in 2001, but introduced new international services to leisure destinations.

The SAS Group and Braathens announced on 21 May 2001 that KLM and Braganza had agreed to sell their 69 percent stake in Braathens for NOK 800 million to SAS— putting Braathens' value at NOK 1.1 billion. Because the two would hold a near-monopoly on domestic services, the merger was investigated by the Norwegian Competition Authority. They initially disapproved of the merger, With bankruptcy imminent and no other purchasers interested, the authority gave the green light on 23 October. As a condition, the authority decided to regulate a ban on frequent flyer programs, and stated that it would ban cross-subsidization aimed at underbidding or operating at a loss to force new entrants out of the market.

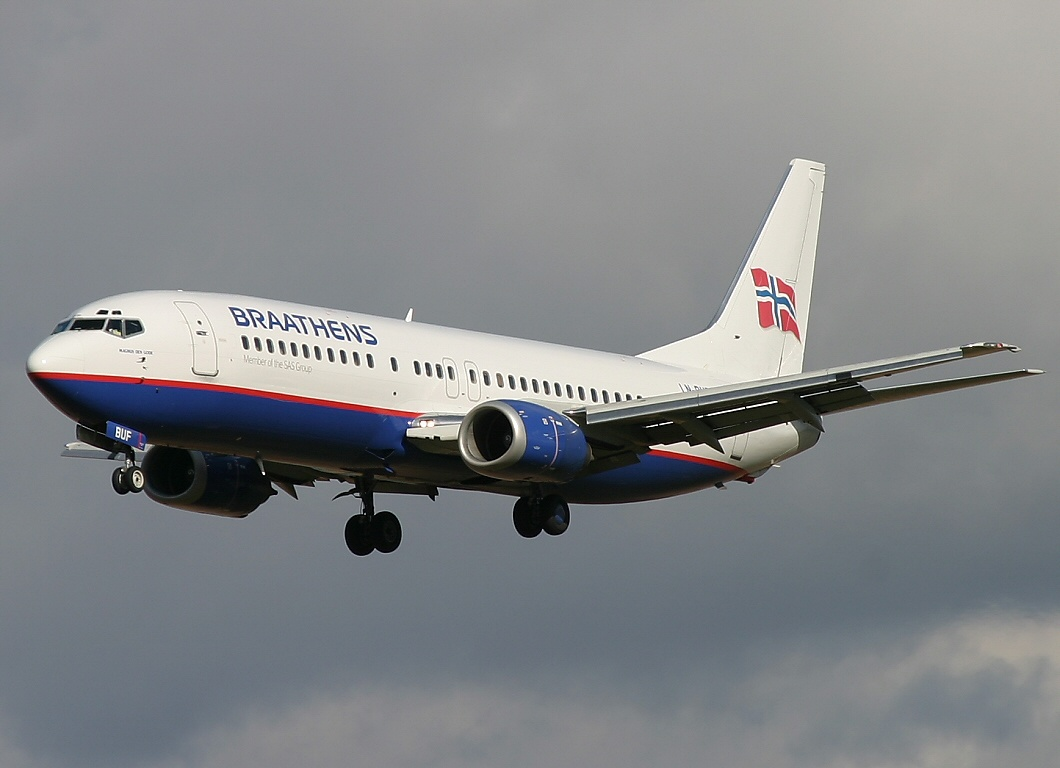
A Braathens Boeing 737-400 in the airline's final livery

SAS and Braathens split all the routes between them on 2 April 2002. Braathens withdrew from the Oslo to Trondheim, Bergen and Stavanger routes, but took over most flights to Northern Norway. On 24 April 2002, SAS announced that all handling services operated by Braathens would be taken over by SAS Ground Services. All SAS employees would be prioritized in the rationalization process, and 800 Braathens employees were laid off. Three hundred Braathens' employees were offered jobs with SAS Ground Services, but these lost their seniority. No employees in SAS lost their jobs. The issue ended in the courts, with the Supreme Court reinstating seniority in 2006. SAS announced on 10 March 2004 that SAS and Braathens would in May be merged into a single company, SAS Braathens. The company took over the operating licence of Braathens, including the IATA and ICAO code, and callsign. From 1 June 2007, SAS Braathens was rebranded to Scandinavian Airlines, making it identical to the branding in Sweden and Denmark, although it remains a separate limited company named SAS Norge AS.

== Fleet ==
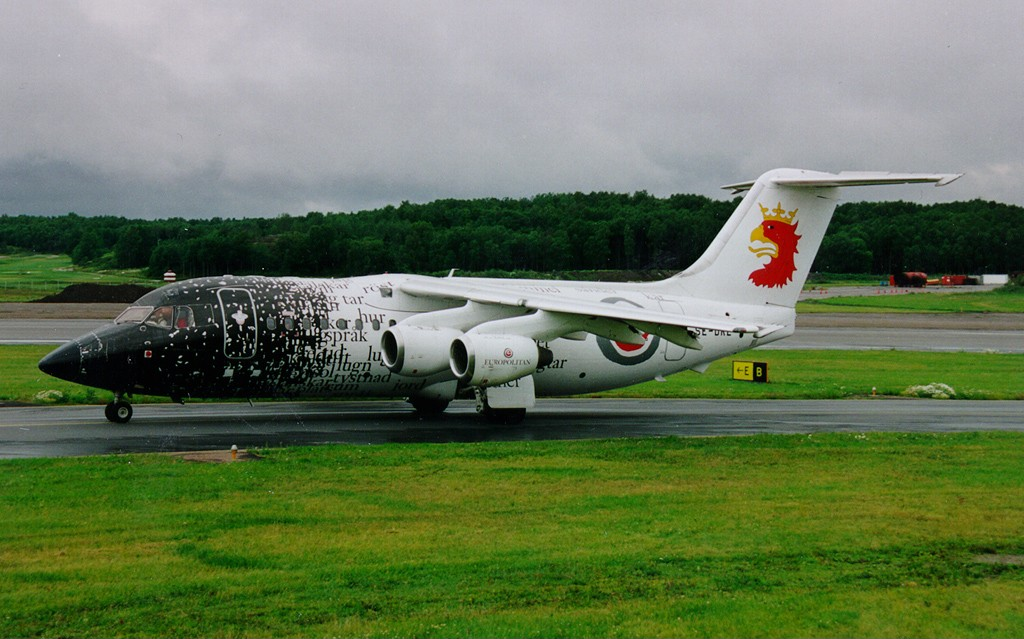
BAe 146-200 in advertisement livery in 2000

The airline operated 118 aircraft of 15 different models. The airline has operated at least three models each from Douglas, Fokker and Boeing, in addition to the de Havilland Heron and British Aerospace 146. The airline's most-operated aircraft is the Boeing 737-200, of which it had 20. Braathens has operated five variants of the 737, totaling 64 aircraft.

From the establishment, Braathens SAFE's aircraft livery had a thick red and thinner white and blue cheatline, with the Flag of Norway on the vertical stabilizer. With only slight modifications, this general design was continued to and including the 737-400 and -500 aircraft. A new livery with a stylized grey wing as logo on the vertical stabilizer and a blue belly was introduced in 1998 with the delivery of the 737-700. The logo was replaced with the Flag of Norway in 1999. Only some of the early Douglas aircraft were named, and those that were started with "Norse". The Heron were given common Norwegian male names. The three last F-27 and newer aircraft were all named for kings of Norway.

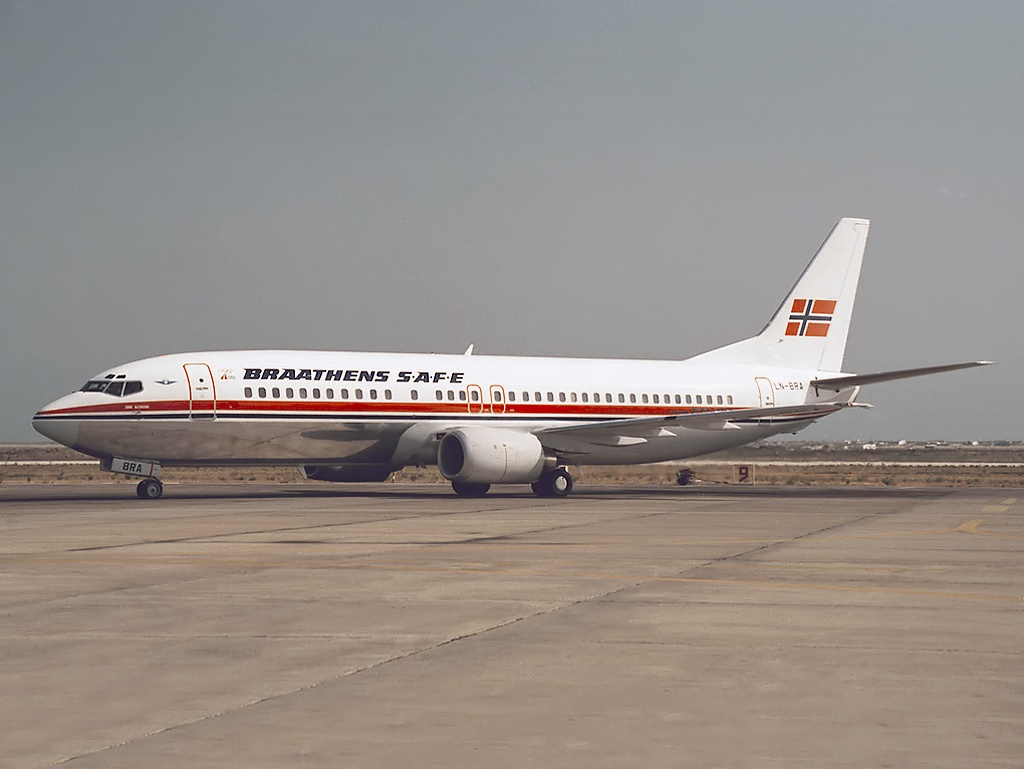
Boeing 737-400 in 1989

List of Braathens aircraft
Manufacturer	Model	Quantity	Introduced	Retired
Douglas	C-54 Skymaster	6	1947	1966
Douglas	C-47 Dakota	2	1947	1964
de Havilland	DH.114 Heron	7	1952	1960
Fokker	F-27 Friendship	8	1958	1977
Douglas	DC-6A/C	1	1961	1965
Douglas	DC-6B	7	1962	1973
Fokker	F-28 Fellowship	6	1969	1986
Boeing	737-200	20	1969	1994
Boeing	767-200	2	1984	1986
Boeing	737-400	7	1989	2004
Boeing	737-500	17	1990	2004
Fokker	100	5	1997	1999
Boeing	737-300	1	1997	1999
Boeing	737-700	13	1998	2004
British Aerospace	146–200	10	1998	2001

== Destinations ==
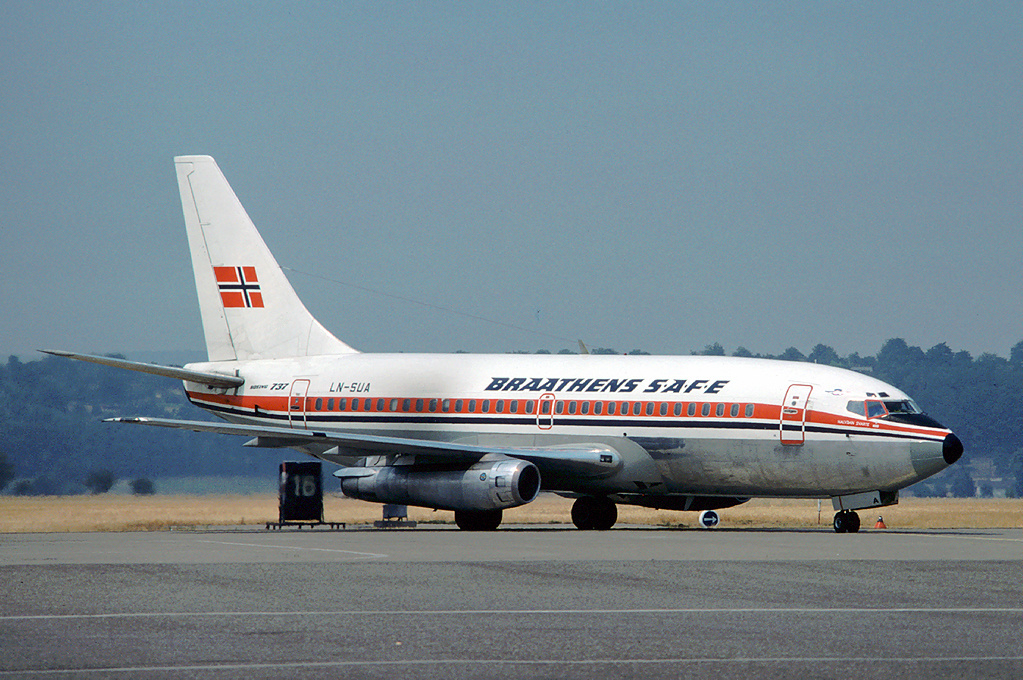
Braathens SAFE Boeing 737-200 in 1976

During its operations, the airline has served 53 airports serving 50 cities. Of these, 25 airports serving 23 cities were in Norway and 6 destinations and cities in Sweden. Braathens had provided international services to 24 airports serving 22 cities in 17 countries. Seven of these cities are in Asia, the rest in Europe. In addition, Braathens has served numerous destinations as both regular and ad-hoc charter. Braathens SAFE's main base was Oslo Airport, Gardermoen from 1946 to 1949, and then moved its main base to Oslo Airport, Fornebu. From the closing of Fornebu in 1998, it moved back to Gardermoen and established it as a hub. From 1997 to 1999, Stockholm Arlanda Airport acted as a hub for Sweden. The main technical base was at Stavanger Airport, Sola.

Prior to 1987 the Norwegian aviation market was split between Braathens SAFE and SAS. The two only competed head-on on the routes from Oslo to Stavanger and Trondheim. Braathens held a monopoly on the routes from Oslo to Kristiansand, Ålesund, Molde and Kristiansund, as well as the West Coast route between Bergen, Ålesund, Molde, Kristiansund and Trondheim, as well as from Western Norway to Northern Norway.

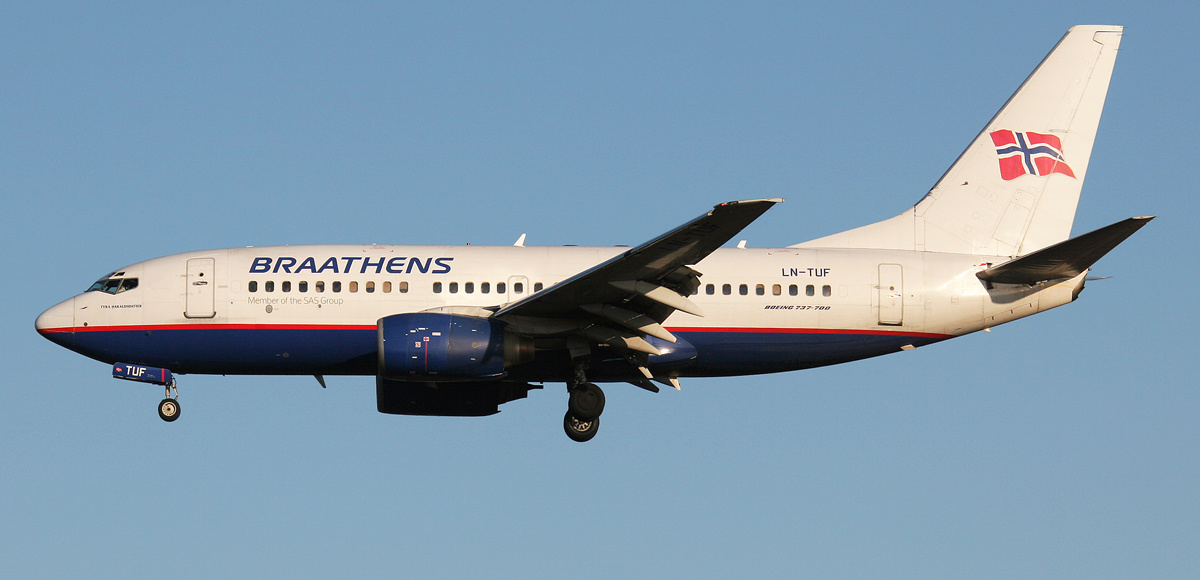
Boeing 737-700

With the opening of Gardermoen in 1998, Braathens had expanded its network to direct services from Oslo to Kristiansand, Stavanger, Haugesund, Bergen, Ålesund, Molde, Kristiansund, Trondheim, Bodø, Harstad/Narvik and Tromsø, in addition to a network of direct routes connected many of these airports with each other. In Sweden, Braahtens operated flights from Stockholm to Luleå, Umeå, Sundsvall, Jönköping and Halmstad. From Oslo, international services were provided to Malmö, Stockholm, Billund, Newcastle, London, Jersey, Nice and Rome, and from 2000 to Barcelona, Alicante and Málaga. Service were flown from several Norwegian cities to Amsterdam.

== Service ==
Prior to 1998, Braathens had a one-class service; the service included a complimentary in-flight meal and discounted tickets were available with restrictions. Starting 23 March 1998, the airline changed its corporate identity to 'Braathens' and introduced a two-class system onboard its planes. Passengers paying full price were seated in the 'Best' category at the front of the plane, making up about 70 percent of the capacity. Best customers received complimentary coffee and meals with non-disposable cutlery, free newspapers and a better seat pitch. Behind the curtain was the 'Back' category, which had no in-flight meals or newspapers and a smaller pitch. However, a meal with coffee and soft drink could be purchased for NOK 45. Back tickets were sold with a discount, but had to be bought at least seven days before travel, and the traveller had to be away over a weekend. There were also some discounted Best tickets, but these never cost as little as the Back tickets.

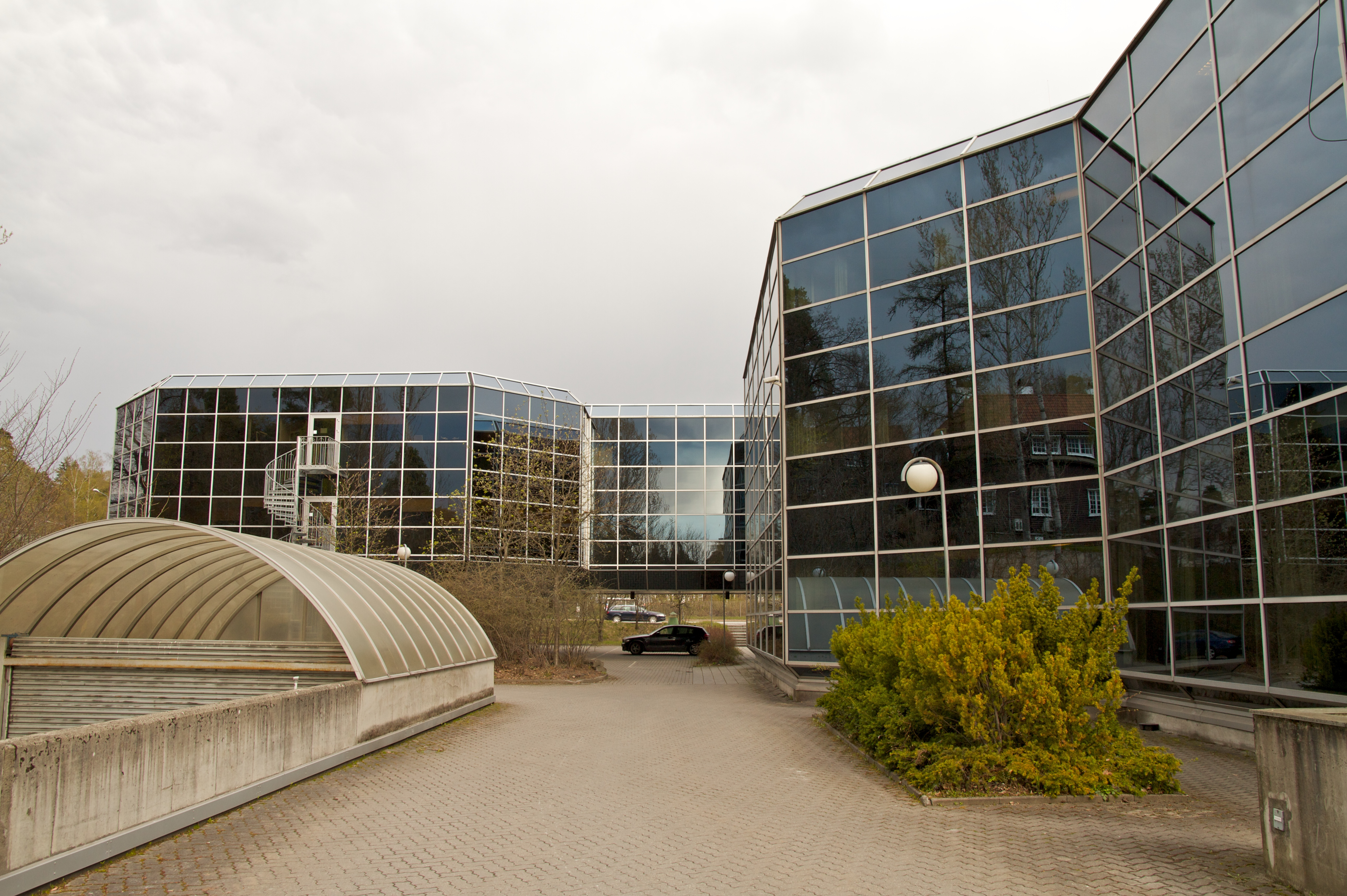
Braathens' head office - Diamanten- opened in 1985

The 'Best' and 'Back' service was highly criticized by analysts and customers. Braathens SAFE had a strong image as the people's airline, in contrast to SAS' business image. Braathens also drew goodwill from being Norwegian-owned and that it displayed the Flag of Norway on the tailplane. Prior to the rebranding, no airline in Norway had ever operated a two-class service on domestic flights. Professor of Sociology Per Morten Schiefloe commented that the segregation offended passengers: Customers who previously had been paying full price, became more aware of the savings on using 'Back' tickets, while people who wanted to travel with discounted tickets felt they received better service and were not treated as second-rate customers with SAS. The effect was that Braathens lost customers at both ends. The rebranding itself not only cost money to initiate, but also increased operating expenses, because cabin crew needed to move the curtain depending on the number of passengers on each class. Planes were sometimes delayed for hours, particularly in the beginning of the service, due to the increased work load on the handling and cabin crew.

Braathens launched its frequent-flyer program as Bracard in 1985, and rebranded it as Wings in 1999. The membership had three tiers: gold, silver and blue. Until 1997, Braathens had agreements with Finnair and British Airways, where Bracard members received miles on the partners flights. After the partnership with KLM was introduced, Wings-members received miles with KLM, Northwest Airlines, Continental Airlines and Alitalia.

== Accidents and incidents ==
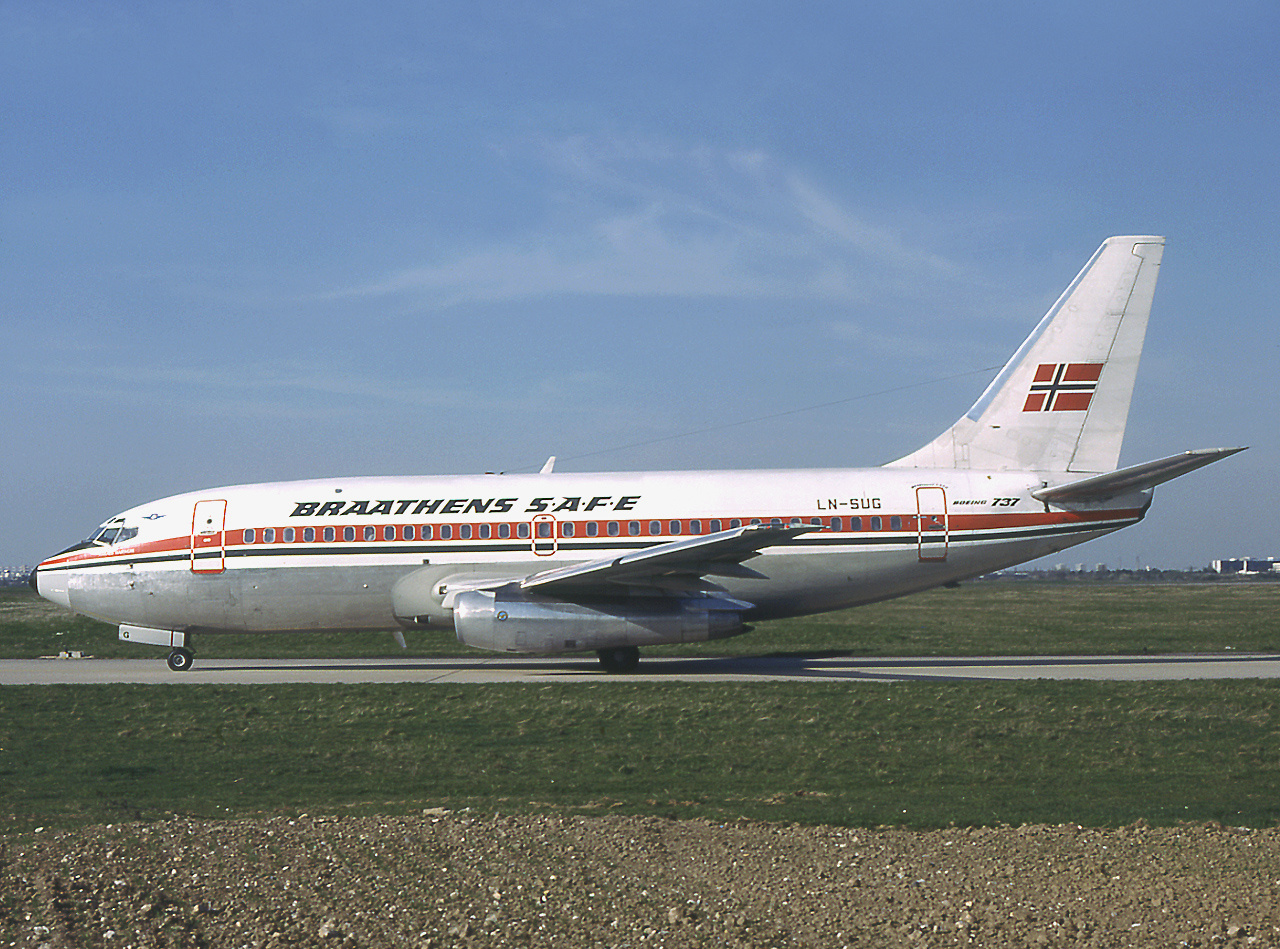
LN-SUG was hijacked in 1985

- On 7 November 1956, the Heron LN-SUR Lars crashed at Hummelfjell after the aircraft had experienced icing problems. The Hummelfjell Accident killed the pilot and one passenger, but the remaining ten people on board survived. Among them was the famous television actor Rolf Kirkvaag, who, despite injury, succeeded at walking to civilization to inform about the accident.
- On 23 December 1972 at 16:30, the company's most fatal accident occurred. F-28 LN-SUY Sverre Sigurdson on Flight 239 from Ålesund to Oslo crashed at Asker, killing 40 of the 45 people on board, including the crew of three. The cause of the accident was never discovered, although a possibility could have been faults with the instrument landing system.
- On 21 June 1985, the 737-200 LN-SUG Harald Gille Flight 139, with 121 passengers en route from Trondheim to Oslo, was hijacked by the 24-year-old Stein Arvid Huseby. He had threatened a flight attendant with an air gun. He demanded to talk to Prime Minister Kåre Willoch and Minister of Justice Mona Røkke and a press conference to make a political statement. Those demands were not met, and he surrendered after 4.5 hours after he demanded and had a few beers. This was the first hijacking in Norway.
