= Norwegian Institute for Strategic Studies =

Norwegian research institute

The Norwegian Institute for Strategic Studies (Norwegian: Norsk institutt for strategiske studier, NORISS) is a strategic studies research institute based in Oslo, Norway.

It was established as an independent institution on 1 January 2006. Structurally, it was organized as a "stiftelse" (foundation) from the start, but was transformed into an "aksjeselskap" (stock company) in 2009. The institute was supported by various organizations, most importantly the trade union Norwegian Union of Municipal and General Employees. In addition to this, the idea was to seek project-based economic support. In January 2010, it became clear that the financial strategy had failed, and the board of directors filed for bankruptcy. According to board member Leif Sande, there had been a dire lack of external demand for research.

Director of NORISS was Jon Bingen. It had a small staff of researchers, in addition to a group of external senior advisors who worked for the institute sporadically. Senior advisors include Hallvard Bakke, Johan J. Jakobsen and Erik Reinert. Chairman of the board when NORISS filed for bankruptcy was Tormod Hermansen, and deputy chair was Gerd Kristiansen.

Not long after the bankruptcy filing, talks of reviving the institute ensued. According to Klassekampen, among those who pondered taking over were Petter Jansen, possibly Sverre Diesen as well as foreign interests. Tormod Hermansen stated that Jon Bingen would no longer be director because of limited financial capabilities.
