= SAS Norge =

SAS Norge may refer to:

- Norwegian Air Lines changed its name to SAS Norge in 1996
- SAS Braathens was briefly known as SAS Norge
- Scandinavian Airlines previously had a division known as SAS Norge
