= Trondheim Airport, Lade =

Trondheim Airport, Lade Lade flyplass
- IATA: none; ICAO: none

Summary
- Airport type: Public
- Serves: Trondheim
- Location: Lade, Trondheim, Norway
- Coordinates: 63°26′35″N 010°26′52″E

Map
- Location in Norway

Runways
Direction	Length		Surface
Direction	m	ft	Surface
	1,140	3,740	Concrete

Lade Airport (Norwegian: Lade flyplass, German: Lade flugplatz) was an air station and later civilian airport located at Lade in Trondheim Municipality, Norway which was in use from 1940 to 1965. It had a 1,140-meter (3,740 ft) concrete runway.

The facility was built by the Luftwaffe during World War II to provide air defense for Trondheim and as a temporary airport until Værnes Air Station was completed. After the end of the war in 1945 the airport was taken over by civilian authorities. Trøndelag Flyveselskap operated from Lade from 1946 to 1950. The airline folded and was replaced by Trønderfly, which lasted for one year. Widerøe then started operating at the airport and continued to do so until its closing, although they never operated scheduled services out of the airport. Aviation clubs at the airport were Trondheim Flyklubb and NTH Flyklubb.

At first Trondheim was mostly served by water aerodromes and from 1952 Trondheim Airport, Værnes became Trondheim's main airport. Braathens SAFE operated scheduled flights to Oslo from 1952 to 1956, when they moved to Værnes. Lade Airport remained in use until 1965, when it was abandoned to allow for the area to be redeveloped for industry, shopping, and a sports venue.

== History ==
=== World War II ===
The site at Lade was traditionally farming land. During the late 19th century it was proposed used as a site for the Norwegian College of Agriculture, but was instead located at Ås Municipality in Akershus county. Thus the area remained an agricultural area at the break-out of World War II in 1940. A Norwegian Simmonds Spartan school aircraft landed at the fields. Scheduled services to Trondheim started in 1937, when Norwegian Air Lines (DNL) started seaplane services out of the port at Ilsvika and the lake of Jonsvannet.

During the German invasion of Norway on 9 April 1940, German pilot Feldwebel Nowak conducted an emergency landing with his Junkers Ju 52 on the fields at Lade. He secured the area and later that day seven more aircraft landed in the fields. Trondheim was a strategically important city as it hosted both a shipyard and a submarine pen, Dora 1, in addition to its strategic location for German aircraft to operate northwards as the Norwegian Campaign continued in Northern Norway.

Værnes Air Station was in such a condition that it was unsuitable for the large German aircraft, such as the Junkers Ju 87 Stuka. Thus the Luftwaffe chose to use both the fields at Lade and the ice on Jonsvannet while Værnes was being upgraded. In April 1940 the Wehrmacht demanded that 500 men be made available immediately to build the airport, and 2000 men within short time. If the local authorities were not able to follow up, the German military threatened to lock down the city and shoot anyone attempting to leave. At Lade there was built a wooden runway, a partially wooden and partially concrete taxiway and some hangars. Later the runway was later rebuilt to concrete. The taxiways were often first built in wood and the later rebuilt to concrete.

Aircraft stationed at Lade consisted for the most part of transporters and Stukas. In addition to serving as a stop-over for flights northwards, Lade was important for the defense of Trondheim and the submarine bases. This was organized as part of Jagdgruppe Drontheim of Jagdgeschwader 5 (JG5). The airport was bombed by the Royal Air Force's Beaufighters by the 248 and 235 Squadron in April 1942. As of 1943 Lade stationed the staff of IV/JG5 with their twelve Messerschmitt Bf 109G-2 aircraft and a detachment of 10/JG5 of five Bf 109G-6s. In an American attack of Dora on 24 July 1943, the winds caused the artificial smoke to cover Lade, but not Dora, allowing the Americans to see their target, but not allow the Germans to scramble their aircraft in defense. In 1944 and 1945 Lade was the base of staff for JG5 and IV/Zerstörergeschwader 26, as well as Messerschmitt Bf 110G from the latter. Transportgeschwader 5 had Ju 52s stationed at Lade during 1944.

=== Civilian operations ===
With the German capitulation on 8 May 1945, the airport at first taken by Allied troops, who disarmed any German military equipment. The airport was subsequently taken over by Norwegian authorities. DNL resumed scheduled flights from Trondheim on 27 May 1946, serving Ilsvika with Ju 52 seaplanes with a stop-over on their Northern Norway route from Oslo Airport, Fornebu. Hjalmar Riiser-Larsen took in a letter to the editor in Adresseavisen in 1947 initiative to establishing a land airport in Trøndelag. The Bukken Bruse Accident in which nineteen people were killed in a crash during landing at the water aerodrome at Hommelvik. However, DNL, and its successor Scandinavian Airlines System never chose to operate out of Lade. Instead they moved their flights to Trondheim Airport, Værnes from 1952.

Trøndelag Flygeselskap A/S was established by Anders Estenstad, Kjell Lefstad, Ola Lefstad and Thor Gjedebo in 1946, receiving an initial share capital of 50,000 Norwegian krone (NOK). The airline bought three aircraft, two three-seat Austers and a four-seat Republic Seabee. It has based in two of the German-built hangars. The company was engaged in air ambulance services, taxi flights, tourist flights and a pilot school.

The aviation activity caught on amongst the city population, resulting in two aviation clubs being established. Trondheim Flyklubb was founded in December 1947, while NTH Flyklubb was reanimated. Affiliated with the Norwegian Institute of Technology, it had been established in 1934. The Civil Aviation Administration demanded in 1948 that the aviation clubs upgrade the airport, specifically by removing the wooden sections of taxiway and runway. This was carried out as a volunteer service during the fall, which allowed the airport to be rated for commercial services. The two clubs organized an annual air show, both to generate income and to raise the interest for aviation.

Trøndelag Flygeselskap remained in business until 1950. A new airline, A/S Trønderfly, was established on 11 July 1950 and bought a single aircraft, serving the uncovered market in the surge of the first company's failure. Trønderfly bought only a single aircraft, which it chose not to insure. The company folded after it crashed the following year. Widerøe thus established itself with a Seabee at Lade in 1951. In addition to the taxi, scenic and ambulance flights, Widerøe also conducted aerial photography, at first using a Fairchild Cornell. From 1956 Widerøe operated a Lockheed Model 12 Electra Junior out of Lade and remained at the airport until it closed.

Braathens SAFE conducted its first landing at the airport on 9 May 1952, using a de Havilland Heron aircraft. Regular services to Oslo Airport, Fornebu commenced on 18 August 1953. The airline marketed itself with having a much more central airport than SAS, allowing for shorter travel times than those traveling via Værnes. The lack of a hard landing surface caused seasonal disruptions in operations and in rainy periods Braathens SAFE had to reroute its services to Værnes. As the aircraft also had to use visual flight rules, during foggy weather it was also forced to land at Værnes. During the period that Braathens operated at Lade, it had the responsibility for local air traffic control. Passengers were checked in at the reception of Hotel Astoria in the city center and then bused to the airport. At first there were three weekly round services, increasing to a daily except Saturday service from May 1954. The route had 3900 in 1953. Braathens moved their Lade services to Værnes in 1956, as Lade was not able to accommodate their new, larger Fokker F-27 Friendship aircraft.

Lade Airport was originally located in Strinda Municipality, a municipality which surrounded the original centre of the city of Trondheim. The city expanded its borders in 1952, annexing the Lade and the airport. This resulted in Lade being one of very few suitable locations for industry within the city limits. Thus a political debate started to decide if Lade was to be used for industry instead of an airport. The issue was intensified in 1956 when Nidar moved its plant to Strindheim, which at the time was still in Strinda. Trondheim's concern was that they would lose tax income it industrial companies moved to Strinda or other neighboring municipalities.

Part of the runway was demolished in 1964 and converted to football fields, Lade Anlegget. This resulted in the runway being shortened to 700 meters (2,300 ft) for 1965, which became the last year the airport was in operation. The runway and taxiways were thereafter demolished to make way for industry and shopping. Most of the hangars were demolished, although the main hangar remained. The aviation clubs moved to Værnes, which saw a reduction of activity. Longer distances, increased parking and hangar rental fees, the need for radio communication certificates all put their toil on recruitment and retaining members. The aviation club later moved its activities to Jonsvannet. With the closing of the airport, several locals took initiative to establish another airport closer to Trondheim. Heimdal was proposed as a site which would be closer than Værnes, but nothing has ever come of the plans.

== Facilities ==
Lade Airport was located at Lade, in the area north of the Meråker Line. The main hangar was located next to Leangen Station. The airport had a concrete runway which measured 1,150 by 40 meters (3,770 by 130 ft). In addition there were a series of taxiways, partially wooden and partially concrete, which connected to aircraft shelters and hangars. The airport never had any instrument landing system and all aircraft movements required visual flight rules. Widerøe set up a "commando center" in their hangar and installed VHF radios to communicate with aircraft.

During World War II the airport was equipped with anti-aircraft warfare measures including flak guns, barrage balloons and a smoke machine. The flak guns were manned by personnel from the Kriegsmarine and had 10.5 and 8.8 centimeters (4.1 and 3.5 in) caliber. There were also a series of machine gun positions with 7.92-millimeter (0.312 in) guns.
