= Diamanten =

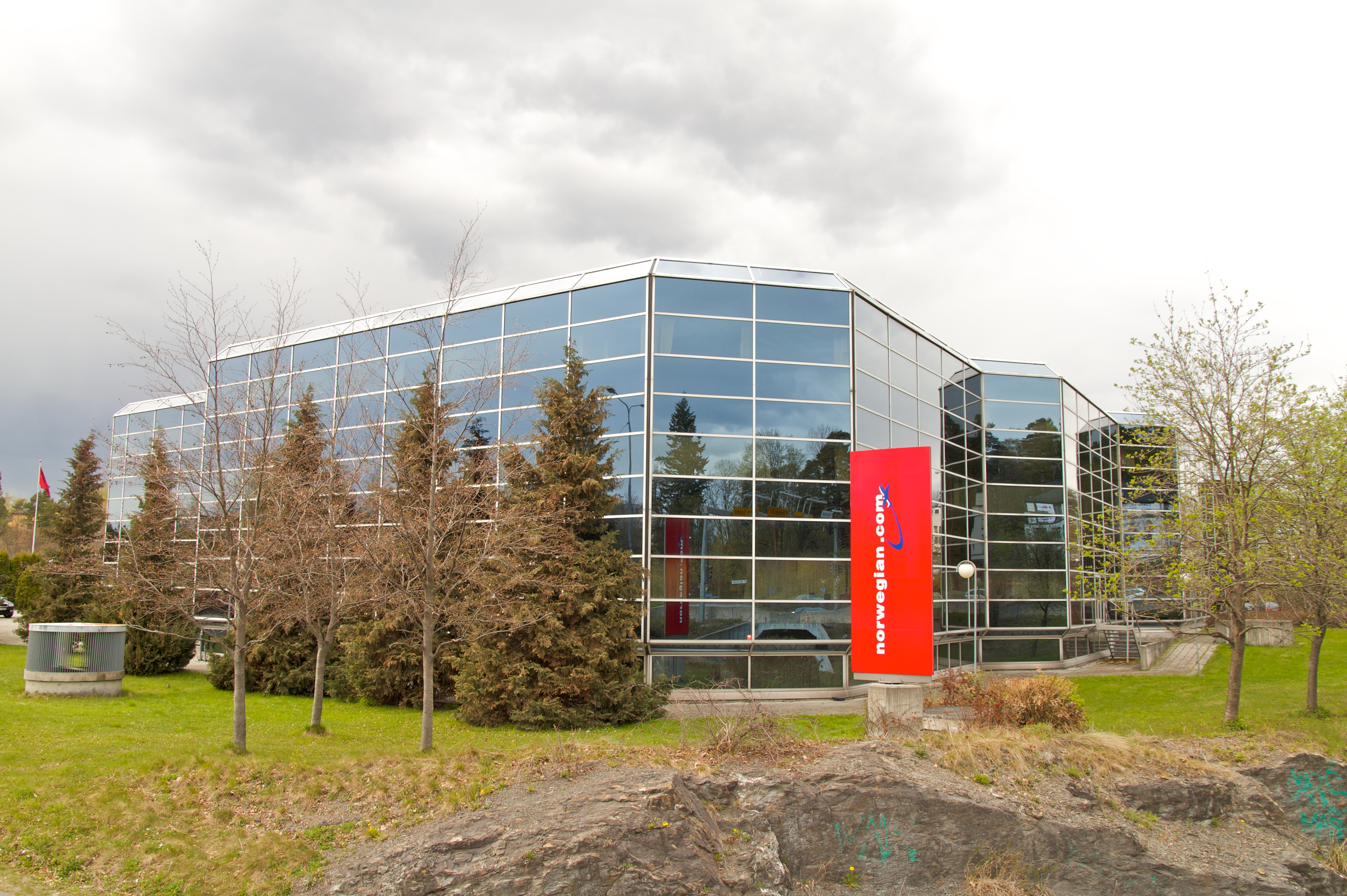
- "Diamanten" May 6th, 2010
- Interactive map of the Diamanten area

General information
- Type: Office
- Architectural style: Postmodernism
- Location: Fornebu, Norway, Oksenøyveien 3
- Coordinates: 59.905795°N 10.628112°E
- Inaugurated: 16 December 1985
- Client: Norwegian Air Shuttle
- Owner: HBK Invest

Technical details
- Floor area: 12,700 m^{2} (137,000 sq ft)

Diamanten ("The Diamond") or Oksenøyveien 3 is an office building located at Fornebu in Bærum, Norway. It was built in 1985 as the head office of the airline Braathens SAFE, and later became the head office of SAS Braathens before the merger with Scandinavian Airlines. As of April 1, 2010, it has been the head office of Norwegian Air Shuttle.

== Facilities ==
The building is 12,900 square metres (139,000 sq ft), of which office space accounts for 10,200 square metres (110,000 sq ft). It runs over three stories and has 177 parking spaces. It has a glass façade and is built in a postmodernist style, with the various annexes shaped like diamonds.

== History ==
When Braathens SAFE was informed they had to leave their rented offices at Ruseløkkveien 26, the company decided to build a new head office near Oslo Airport, Fornebu. Diamanten was taken into use on 16 December 1985 and was officially opened in January 1986 by Minister of Transport and Communications Johan J. Jacobsen. The building was expanded in 1997. After Scandinavian Airlines System and Braathens merged to create SAS Braathens, Diamanten became the new company's headquarters. From 2007, when SAS Braathens was merged into SAS, it became SAS' head office in Norway. SAS rented the building for NOK 1,300 per square meter per month, giving a rental cost of NOK 17.4 million in 2009. After SAS decided to reduce its Norwegian administration from 300 to 100 people, it chose to move out of Diamanten from February 2010.

On 24 February 2010, Norwegian Property announced that they had sold the building to Hbk Invest, which is 84% owned by Bjørn Kjos, the former CEO of Norwegian Air Shuttle. The building cost NOK 175 million, giving a yield of 8%. At the same time, Norwegian Air Shuttle announced that they would move their head office from various offices at Fornebu to Diamanten. The rental agreement has a duration of ten years, with an option to extend for another five years and the right to purchase the building for the price paid by HKB Invest.
