= Fornebu =

Coordinates: 59°53′N 10°37′E

- Village
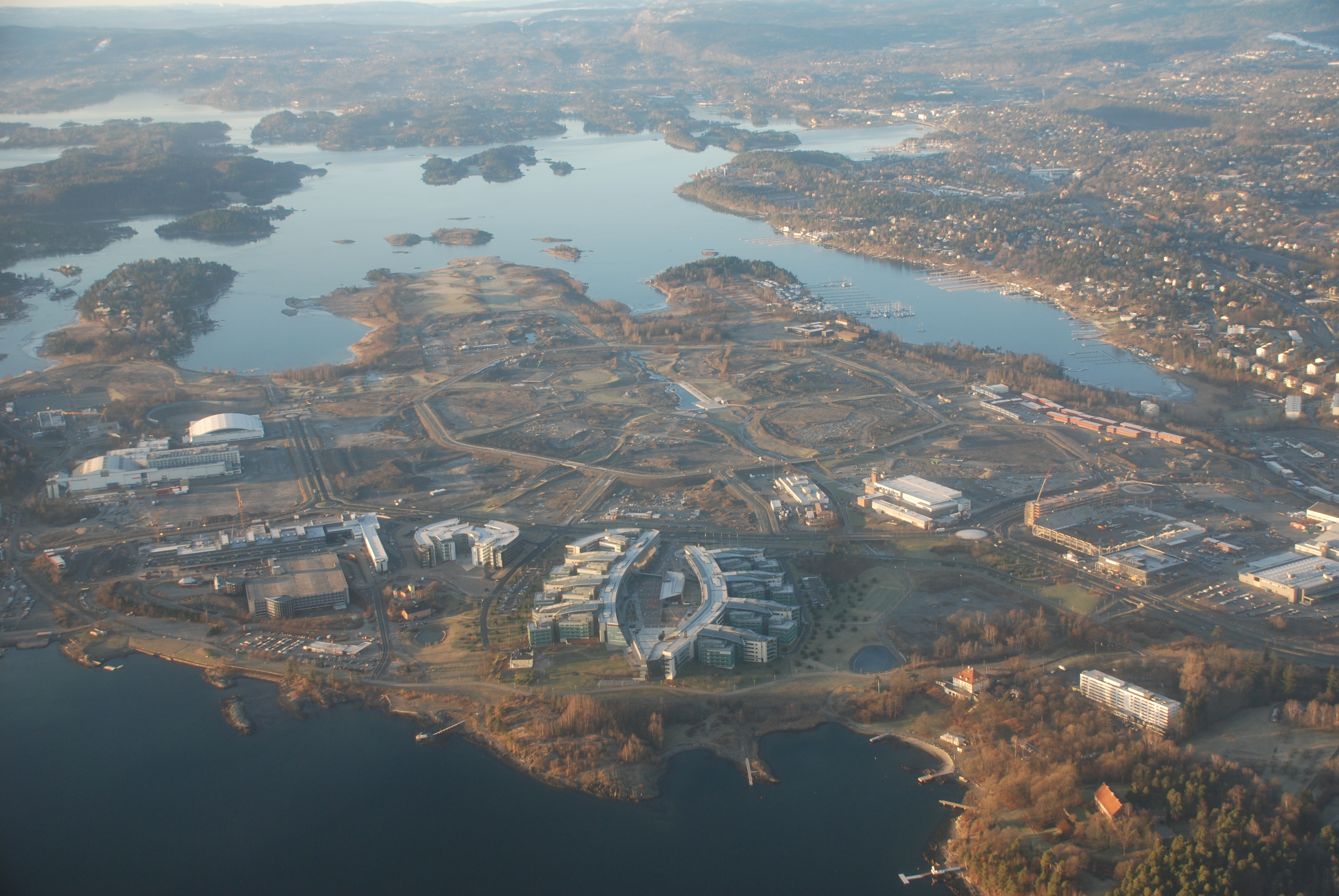
- Fornebu in 2007
- Interactive map of Fornebu
- Country: Norway
- Region: Østlandet
- County: Akershus
- Municipality: Bærum
- Time zone: UTC+01:00 (CET)
  - Summer (DST): UTC+02:00 (CEST)

Fornebu (local form Fornebo) is a peninsular area in the suburban municipality of Bærum in Norway, bordering western parts of Oslo.

Oslo Airport, Fornebu (FBU) served as the main airport for Oslo and the country since before World War II and until the evening of October 7, 1998, when it was closed down. Overnight, a grand moving operation was performed, so that the following morning, the new main airport, located inland at Gardermoen (OSL), opened for operations as the main airport, as opposed to previously having been a minor airport.

As of 2001, the Fornebu area is being developed as a centre for information technology and telecom industry, as well as there being some housing project developments nearby. The new headquarters of Norway's telecom giant Telenor are located in the area.

The peninsula is connected to Langodden and Snarøya, which are more established areas of private residences.

== Etymology ==
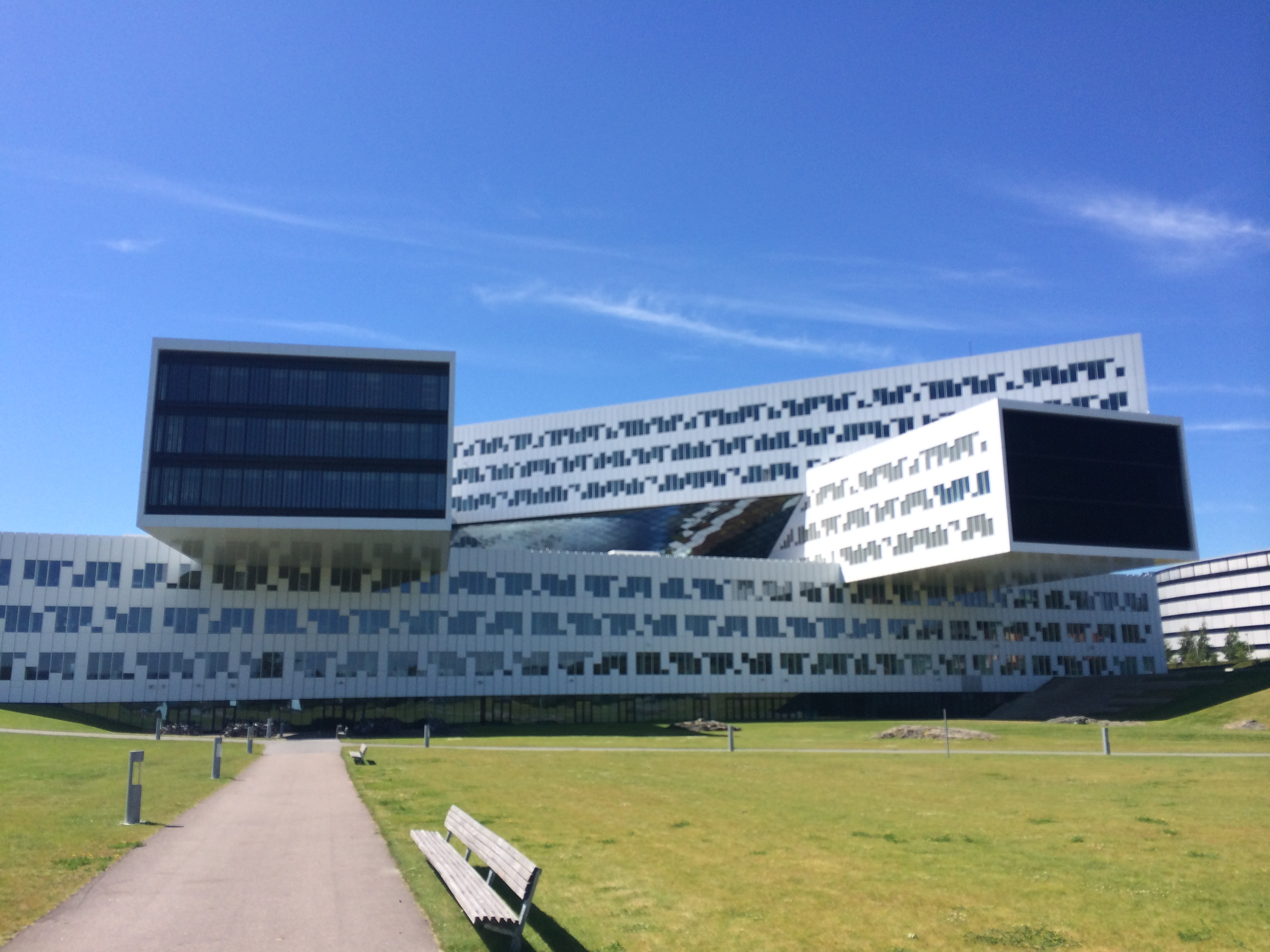
Equinor headquarters building in Fornebu (2012)

The name (Norse Fornabú(ð)) originally belonged to an old farm on the peninsula. The first element is the genitive form of an old male name Forni, the last element is bú n 'farm' (or maybe búð f 'shed, simple house').

== Economy ==
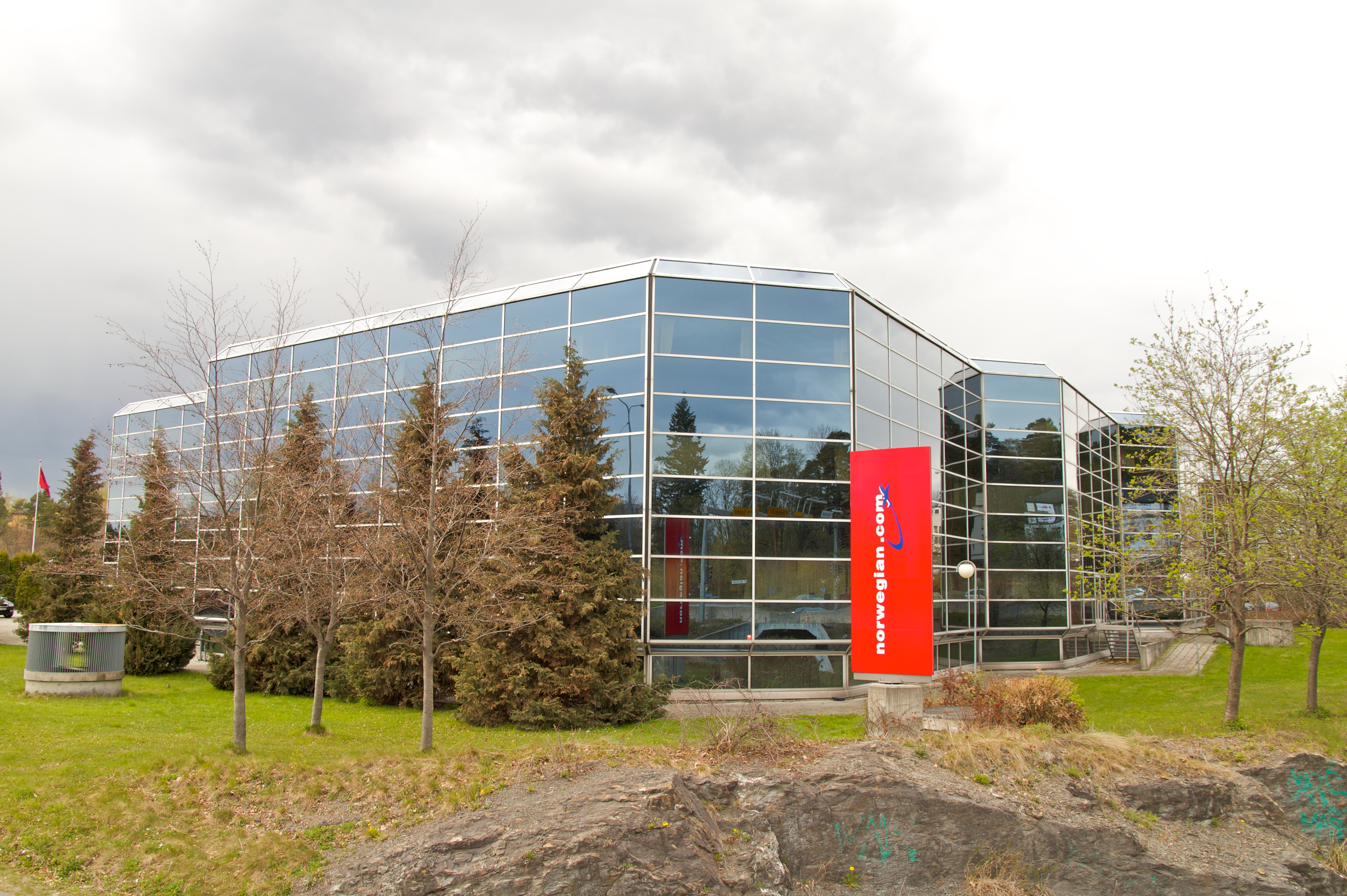
Diamanten, the head office of Norwegian Air Shuttle

Scandinavian Airlines System's Norway offices are in Fornebu. Norwegian Air Shuttle, Telenor, Aker Kværner, Canal Digital, Equinor, Norgesgruppen and EVRY are also based at Fornebu.

Partnair, a charter airline, was headquartered at Fornebu Airport up to 1989. When the airline Busy Bee of Norway existed, its head office was on the grounds of Fornebu Airport. Braathens and SAS Braathens had their head office facilities in a building on the grounds of Fornebu Airport. In 2010 Norwegian Air Shuttle bought the former Braathens head office.

== Climate ==
Climate data for Fornebu 1961-1990, extremes 1947-2015
Month	Jan	Feb	Mar	Apr	May	Jun	Jul	Aug	Sep	Oct	Nov	Dec	Year
Record high °C (°F)	12.7 (54.9)	15.3 (59.5)	18.2 (64.8)	24.4 (75.9)	28.6 (83.5)	35.2 (95.4)	32.6 (90.7)	34.0 (93.2)	28.0 (82.4)	22.0 (71.6)	15.5 (59.9)	13.7 (56.7)	35.2 (95.4)
Mean daily maximum °C (°F)	−1.5 (29.3)	−0.7 (30.7)	3.9 (39.0)	9.7 (49.5)	16.5 (61.7)	21.1 (70.0)	22.2 (72.0)	20.9 (69.6)	16.0 (60.8)	10.1 (50.2)	3.7 (38.7)	−0.2 (31.6)	10.1 (50.3)
Mean daily minimum °C (°F)	−7.7 (18.1)	−7.9 (17.8)	−4.0 (24.8)	0.6 (33.1)	6.7 (44.1)	11.3 (52.3)	12.7 (54.9)	11.7 (53.1)	7.9 (46.2)	3.8 (38.8)	−1.9 (28.6)	−6.1 (21.0)	2.3 (36.1)
Record low °C (°F)	−26.0 (−14.8)	−29.7 (−21.5)	−22.1 (−7.8)	−11.0 (12.2)	−3.1 (26.4)	2.2 (36.0)	5.4 (41.7)	3.6 (38.5)	−2.4 (27.7)	−8.0 (17.6)	−16.0 (3.2)	−22.4 (−8.3)	−29.7 (−21.5)
Average precipitation mm (inches)	42 (1.7)	32 (1.3)	41 (1.6)	38 (1.5)	54 (2.1)	65 (2.6)	78 (3.1)	84 (3.3)	85 (3.3)	81 (3.2)	68 (2.7)	46 (1.8)	714 (28.2)
Average precipitation days	8.9	6.5	7.6	7.3	8.7	10.0	10.1	11.2	10.9	10.8	10.1	7.8	109.9
Source: Eklima http://sharki.oslo.dnmi.no/pls/portal/BATCH_ORDER.PORTLET_UTIL.Download_BLob?p_BatchId=853527&p_IntervalId=1644678

== See also ==
- Oksenøen
