= Petter Jansen =

Norwegian businessperson

Petter Jansen (born 30 August 1955) is a Norwegian businessperson and CEO of Norwegian Property. He is educated in the Norwegian military and the Swedish military as well as from Östersund Business School (1986–88) and an executive program at London Business School. After a career in the military, he became director of Oslo Airport, Fornebu between 1993 and 1996 when he was employed in Den norske Bank and later became CEO of Postbanken. In 2004 he was employed as CEO SAS Braathens until June 2006 after internal struggle and he was hired by Norwegian Properties. He is also chairman of Tromsø 2018 that is creating the Tromsø bid for the 2018 Winter Olympics.
