= SAS Braathens =

Airline of Norway (2004–2007)

| IATA | ICAO | Call sign |
|---|---|---|
| BU | CNO | SCANOR |
- Founded: 1 May 2004
- Ceased operations: 1 June 2007 (merged into Scandinavian Airlines)
- Hubs: Oslo Airport, Gardermoen
- Frequent-flyer program: EuroBonus
- Alliance: Star Alliance (affiliate; 2004–2007)
- Fleet size: 56
- Destinations: 40
- Parent company: SAS Group
- Headquarters: Diamanten, Fornebu, Bærum, Norway
- Key people: Petter Jansen (CEO, 2004–2006); Ola H. Strand (CEO, 2006–2007)
- Website: www.sasbraathens.no

SAS Braathens was the name of Norway's largest airline, created by a merger between Scandinavian Airlines' Norwegian division and Braathens in 2004. On 1 June 2007, the airline was integrated into mainline SAS, and changed its name to SAS Scandinavian Airlines Norge. The airline operated from its hub at Oslo Airport, Gardermoen, and was also the largest national branch of Scandinavian Airlines. SAS Braathens had its head office in Diamanten on the grounds of the now-closed Fornebu Airport in Fornebu, Bærum, Norway.

SAS Braathens was a wholly owned subsidiary of the Scandinavian Airlines System (SAS) Group and was established in the spring of 2004, based on SAS Norway and Braathens. SAS Braathens operated routes in Norway, and also between Norway and the rest of Europe. The airline was the largest in Norway, and had 440 departures daily. SAS Braathens carried around 9 million passengers in 2006. Profit for the first half of 2005 came to NOK 206 million.

SAS Braathens had a route network covering 40 destinations from Longyearbyen in the north to Las Palmas in the south. The route network was operated by a total of 57 aircraft: 51 Boeing 737s and 6 Fokker 50s. Through its parent Scandinavian Airlines, SAS Braathens was a member of the global Star Alliance network. Since it was established in April 2004, SAS Braathens has created or announced a total of 18 new international routes. Around 3,750 employees work for the airline, which is based in Fornebu, close to Oslo.

== History ==
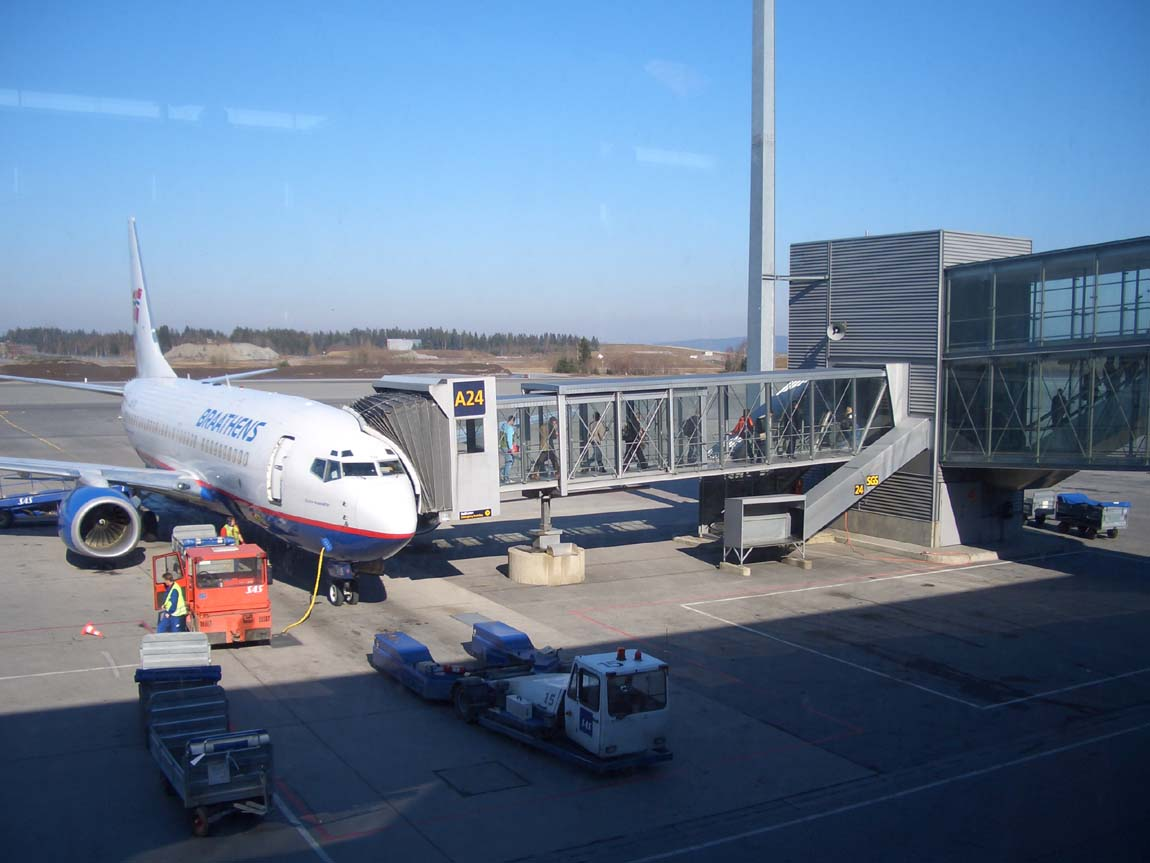
Deplaning passengers at Oslo Airport

=== Scandinavian Airlines ===
Scandinavian Airlines was founded on 1 August 1946 when the flag carriers of Denmark, Sweden and Norway formed a partnership to handle intercontinental traffic to Scandinavia. Operations started on 17 September 1946. Det Norske Luftfartselskab (DNL) is the former Norwegian flag carrier which was founded in 1927. The companies embarked on coordination of European operations in 1948 and finally merged to form the current SAS Consortium in 1951. Upon foundation the airline was divided between SAS Danmark (28.6%), SAS Norge (28.6%) and SAS Sweden (42.8%), all owned 50% by private investors and 50% by their respective governments. SAS gradually acquired control of the domestic markets in all three countries by acquiring full or partial control of several local airlines. The ownership structure of SAS was changed in June 2001, with a holding company being created in which the holdings of the governments changed to Sweden (21.4%), Norway (14.3%) and Denmark (14.3%) and the remaining 50% publicly held and traded on the stock market.

=== Braathens ===
Braathens was founded on March 26, 1946. For many years, Braathens was known as Braathens S.A.F.E, the latter part being an acronym standing for South American and Far East, for the destinations Braathens originally served. The company was founded by Norwegian ship owner Ludvig G. Braathen, with the intention of serving his ships in other parts of the world. In 2001 Braathens formed an alliance with KLM and Northwest Airlines. Alitalia was supposed to also join that alliance, but later decided not to. Braathens also dropped the SAFE from their name, and the company was known as Braathens until 2004. In 2001, after tough economic times, Braathens was bought by the Scandinavian Airlines System (SAS), although they were able to keep operating under their name until SAS Braathens became operative 1 April 2005.

=== SAS Braathens ===
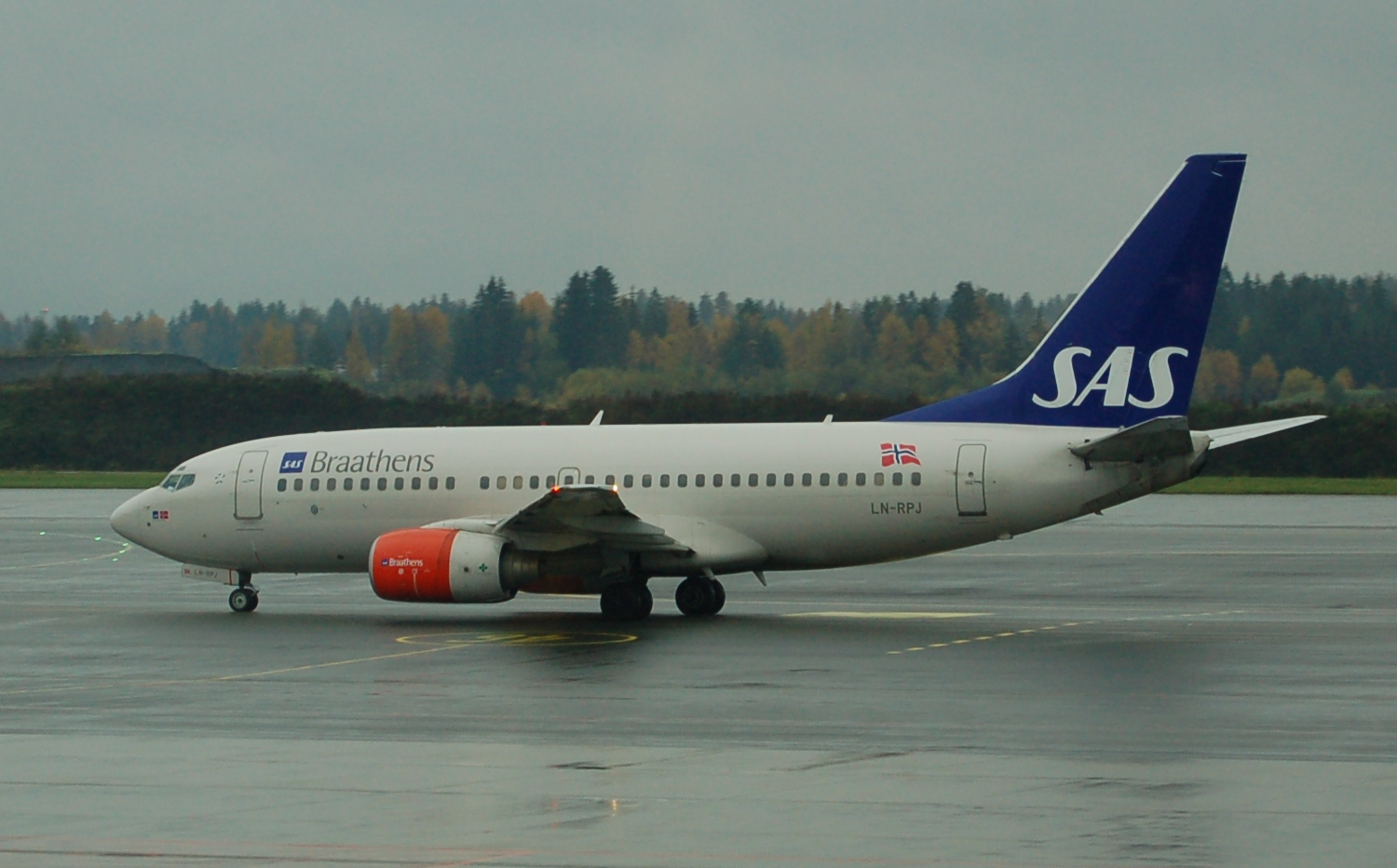
Boeing 737-700

The first months of 2006 were marked by conflict, and ill pilots caused several flights to be cancelled. Negotiations between cabin personnel and management failed on 6 April, leading to a strike grounding most of the flights, though a deal between management and the unions ended the strike on April 8.

By 2007 the airline was one of Norway's most prominent companies, but the lack of reliability caused by the number of cancelled and delayed flights has put the airline at the bottom of 140 Norwegian companies ranked by consumer confidence. The April 2006 strike benefitted SAS Braathens' main competitor, Norwegian Air Shuttle.

SAS Braathens CEO Petter Jansen was forced to leave office in June 2006 after disputes with the SAS management in Stockholm, causing much controversy and debate in Norway, since Jansen was leading the only national branch of Scandinavian Airlines that made a profit.

However, in 2007 the airline was rebranded as Scandinavian Airlines itself.

== Flight codes ==
All SAS Braathens flights were operated with the IATA code BU, but all of the SAS Braathens flights were sold and screened at airports as SK flights.

== Destinations ==
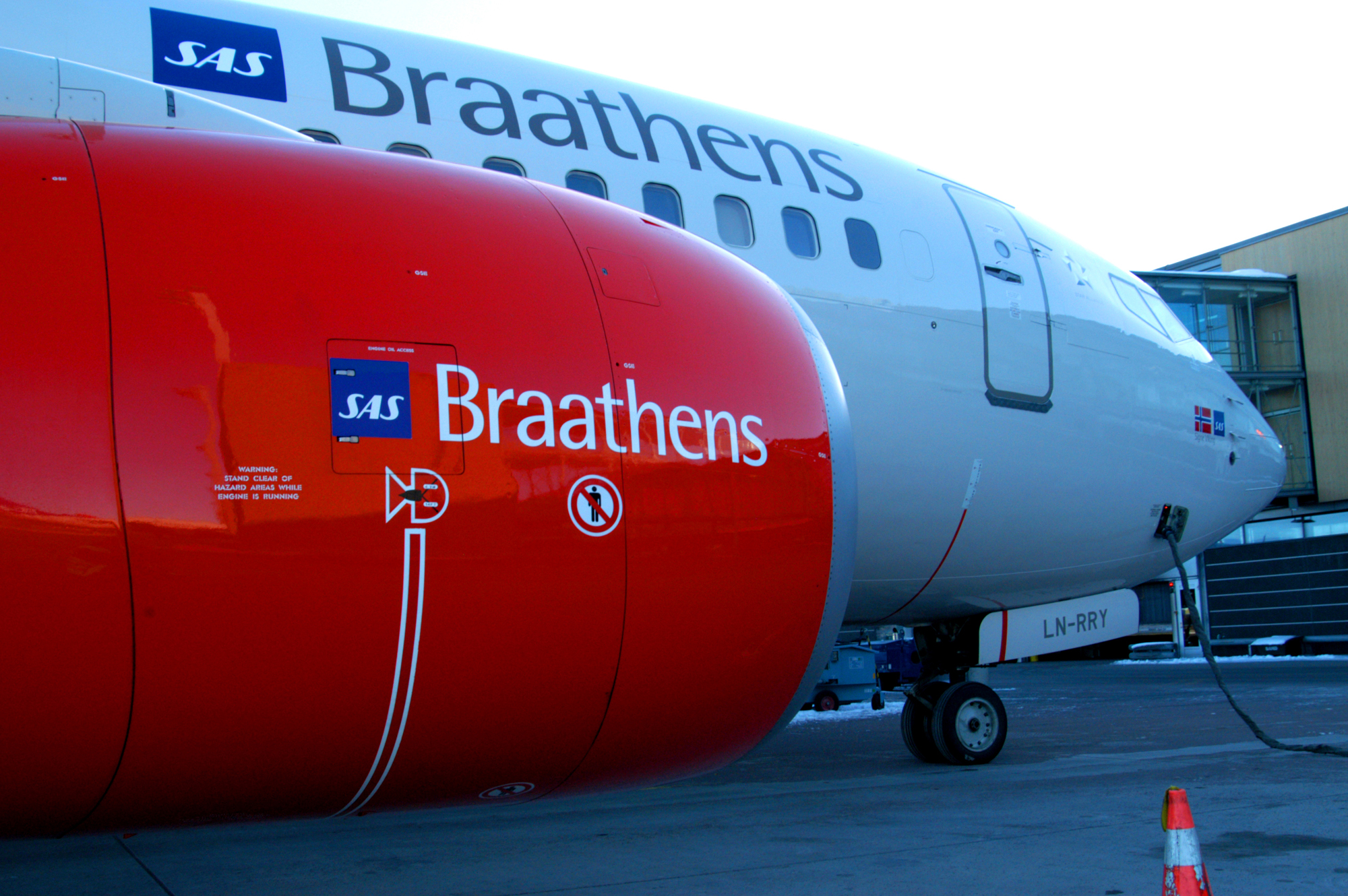
Detail of the engine of the SAS Braathens aircraft LN-RRY "Signe Viking"

As of June 1, 2007, SAS Braathens served 46 destinations, 17 domestic and 29 European destinations.

== Fleet ==
The SAS Braathens fleet included the following aircraft as of June 2012:

| Image | Aircraft | Number | Orders | Passengers | Type | Notes |
|---|---|---|---|---|---|---|
| | Boeing 737-400 | 4 | 0 | 150 | Short to medium range | |
| | Boeing 737-500 | 13 | 0 | 120 | Scandinavian | Leased from SAS Scandinavian Airlines |
| | Boeing 737-600 | 13 | 0 | 112-116 | Scandinavian | Leased from SAS Scandinavian Airlines |
| | Boeing 737-700 | 17 | 2 | 131-141 | Short to medium range | |
| — | Boeing 737-800 | 9 | 0 | 150-176 | Medium range/High density | 1 in Star Alliance scheme 3 leased from SAS Scandinavian Airlines |
Retired Fleet
| | Fokker 50 | 6 | 0 | 50 | Norwegian domestic | |

== Cabin ==
SAS Braathens operated three classes on the European business destinations and two classes on leisure destinations. In April 2007 SAS Braathens upgraded its Economy Extra and Business class. In Economy class they introduced the new buy on board concept "Cloudshop".

=== Domestic ===
One class
Breakfast was served free, after 9am sandwiches and drinks are available for purchase from the "CloudShop".

=== Intra-Scandinavia ===
Passengers booked with a Business class ticket travelled in Economy Extra on Intra-Scandinavian flights.
Economy Class
breakfast, sandwiches and drinks were available for purchase from the "CloudShop".
Economy Extra
fast-track at the Security at some European airports, a three-course cold meal or cold breakfast

=== Europe ===
Economy Class
Breakfast, sandwiches and drinks were available for purchase from the "CloudShop".
Economy Extra
fast-track at security at some European airport, a three-course cold meal or cold breakfast.
Business
fast-track at security at some European airport and access to lounges. Free center seat. Complimentary magazines and destination newspapers in the cabin. Cocktails and cold snacks are served before meal, a three-course hot meal or hot breakfast, on flights shorter than 1h 40 min a cold meal is served. After the meal dessert, coffee/tea were served separate. Before landing a give-away was handed out (e.g. Valrhona chocolate).

== Euro Bonus ==
SAS Braathens used the SAS EuroBonus frequent flyer program. They also had a membership club (shared with SAS) for Scandinavians living abroad called Fly Home Club.

== Head office ==
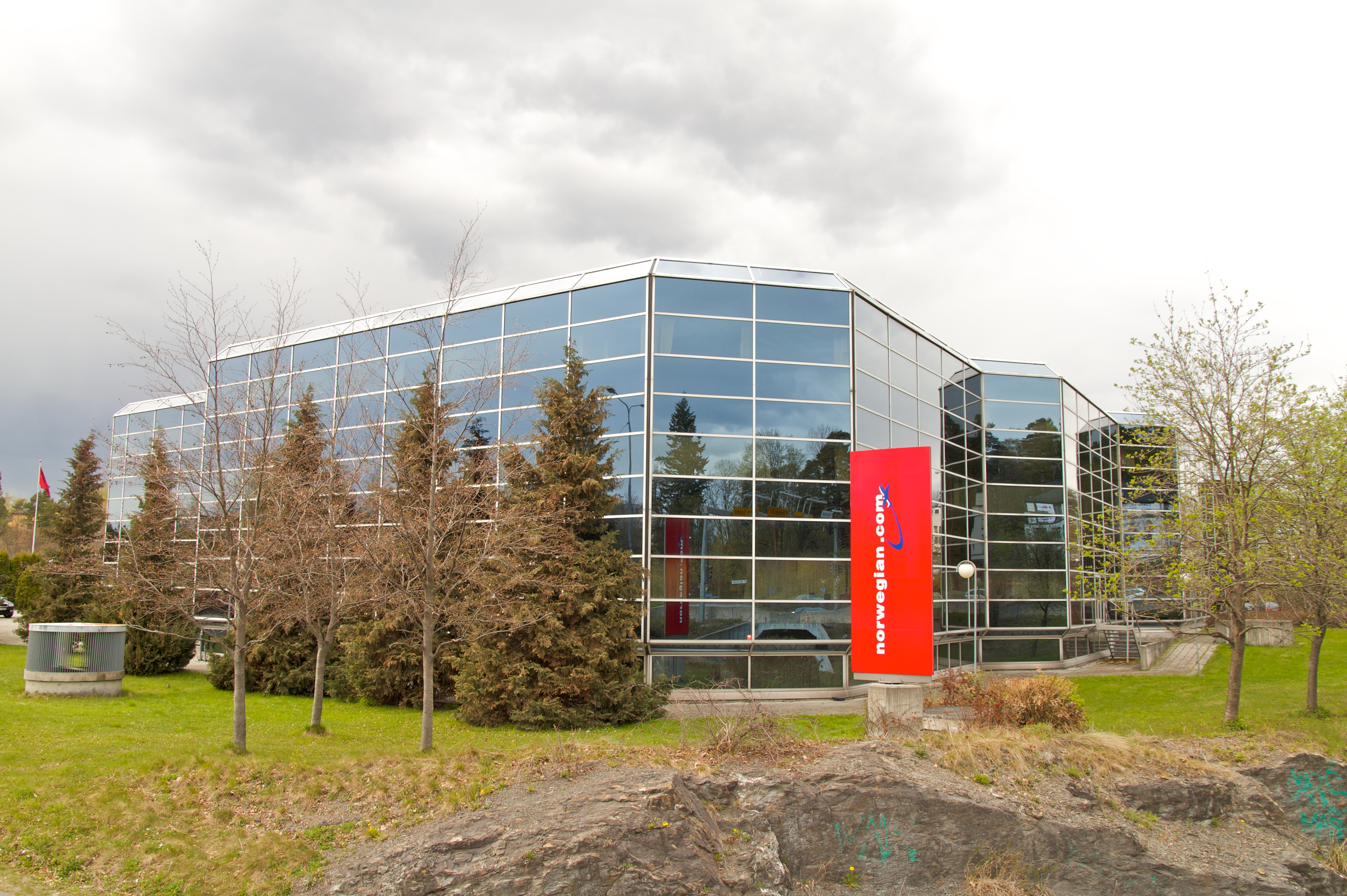
Diamanten, the head office of Norwegian Air Shuttle, formerly the SAS Braathens head office

SAS Braathens had its head office in Diamanten on the grounds of Fornebu Airport in Fornebu, Bærum, Norway. In 2010, the main competitor of SAS Braathens, Norwegian Air Shuttle, bought the former Braathens head office at Fornebu Airport.
