= Wings Alliance =

Failed proposal of an airline alliance

Wings Alliance was the working name of a proposed airline alliance to be anchored by the American carriers Northwest Airlines and Continental Airlines of USA with the European flag carriers KLM of the Netherlands and Italy's Alitalia. Although these airlines cooperated with one another through code-sharing and frequent flyer program coordination, no formal association was ever announced. It was rendered superfluous in September 2004 when most of its participants joined the SkyTeam alliance.

Northwest and KLM had begun cooperating in 1989, but the formation of the Star Alliance in 1997 led by United Airlines and Lufthansa represented a new direction for airline marketing. Passengers could book seamless itineraries across the coordinated schedules of member carriers, accrue and redeem frequent flyer miles in their preferred program, and enjoy reciprocal lounge access and other elite flyer privileges. In September 1998, American Airlines, British Airways, Qantas, Canadian Airlines International and Cathay Pacific announced the creation of a rival alliance, oneworld.

Non-aligned airlines maneuvered to form their own partnerships. Swissair and Sabena built a network around the Qualiflyer program and Air France and Delta Air Lines announced a partnership that would grow into the SkyTeam alliance. Northwest and KLM, which had begun cooperating with Continental in 1998, did not immediately reorganize their tripartite relationship into a third, competing alliance; however, industry analysts widely expected the move would come in 1999. Indeed, in the spring of that year, leaders of the labor unions representing the airlines' pilots met to coordinate negotiations. KLM had merged its cargo operations with those of Alitalia, and with Northwest extended its partnership to Alitalia effective November 1, 1999. In December, Continental received regulatory approval to partner with Alitalia, bringing membership of the nascent alliance to four.

Other airlines which had expressed interest in joining included Malaysia Airlines, Air China, Air Europa and Garuda Indonesia.

Numerous disputes would prevent Wings from ever taking flight, however. As part of their partnership, Northwest had taken a stake in Continental, raising the hackles of antitrust regulators in the United States Department of Justice. Across the Atlantic KLM came to blows with Alitalia over access to the new Malpensa International Airport serving Milan. KLM had contributed some $95 million to the construction of the replacement for overcrowded Linate Airport, but the Italian government used the project to shore up Alitalia at foreign carriers' expense, by barring them from flying into the much more convenient Linate. Alitalia left to join SkyTeam, while KLM dallied with a potential merger with British Airways, a oneworld carrier. Finally, the European Commission began its own antitrust investigation into the relationship between KLM and Northwest.

The EC investigation closed its investigation in late July 2002, but momentum for forming a true alliance had been lost. The members of would-be Wings focused on bilateral agreements with smaller carriers instead. In 2003 KLM began negotiations to merge with SkyTeam carrier Air France, which was concluded in early 2004, while Continental Airlines and Northwest began negotiating their own entry. KLM, Northwest, and Continental formally joined SkyTeam in September 2004, rendering the Wings alliance officially defunct.

== Possible member airlines ==
Airline	Notes	Eventual Alliance joined
Air China	Expressed interest in joining	Star Alliance
Air Europa	Expressed interest in joining	SkyTeam
Alitalia		SkyTeam
Continental Airlines		SkyTeam (moved to Star Alliance shortly before its merger with United)
Garuda Indonesia	Expressed interest in joining	SkyTeam
KLM		SkyTeam
Malaysia Airlines	Expressed interest in joining	oneworld
Northwest Airlines		SkyTeam

== See also ==
- oneworld
- SkyTeam
- Star Alliance
- Qualiflyer
- Vanilla Alliance
