= Tolga-Os Municipality =

Former municipality in Hedmark, Norway

Tolga-Os Municipality Tolga-Os kommune
- Former municipality
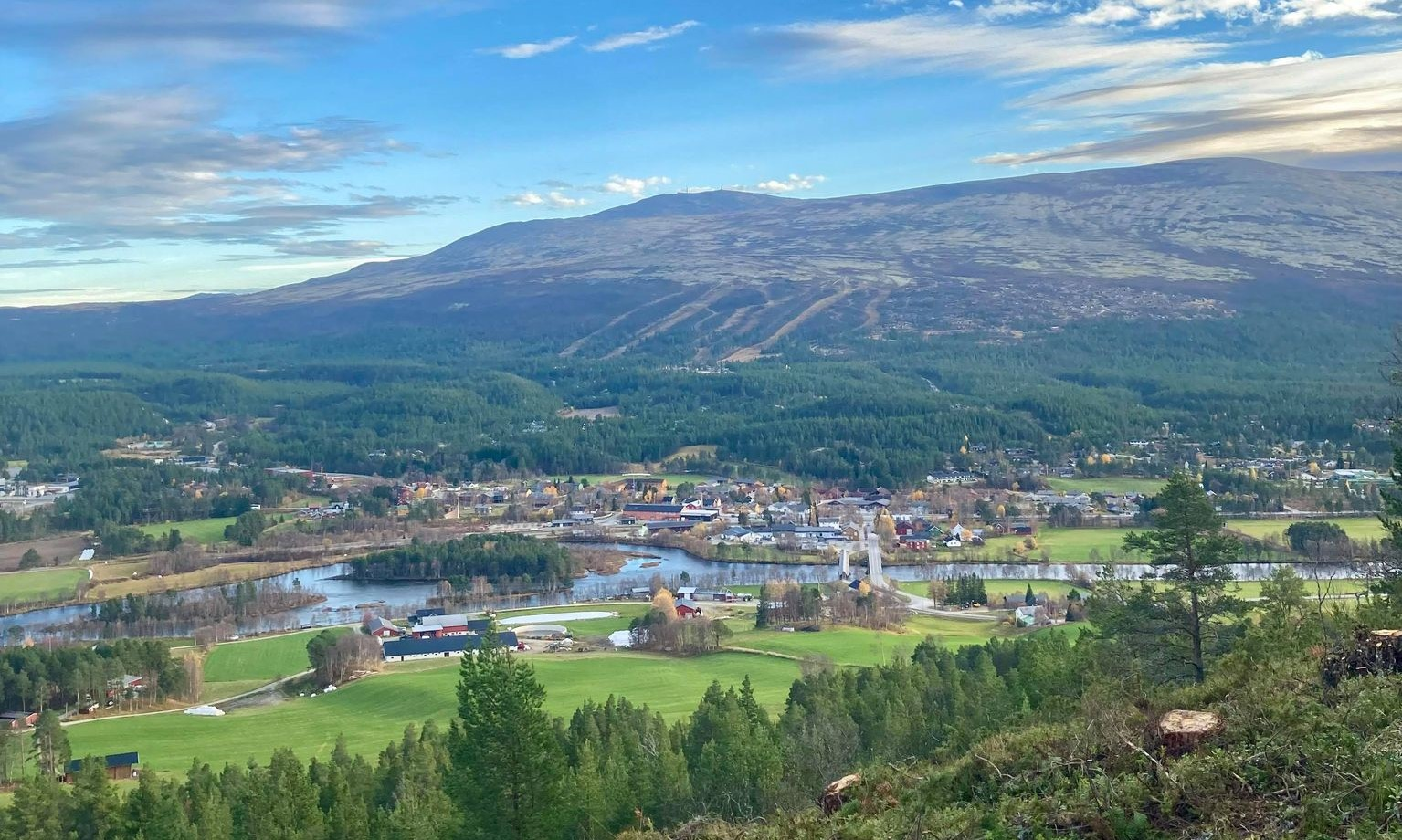
- View of the village of Os

- Hedmark within Norway

- Tolga-Os within Hedmark
- Coordinates: 62.4358°N 11.1120°E
- Country: Norway
- County: Hedmark
- District: Østerdalen
- Established: 1 Jan 1966
  - Preceded by: Tolga Municipality and Os Municipality
- Disestablished: 1 Jan 1976
  - Succeeded by: Tolga Municipality and Os Municipality
- Administrative centre: Tolga

Government
  - Mayor (1972-1975): Lars Solbu (Sp)

Area (upon dissolution)
  - Total: 2,163.09 km^{2} (835.17 sq mi)
  - Land: 2,106 km^{2} (813 sq mi)
  - Water: 57.09 km^{2} (22.04 sq mi) 2.6%
  - Rank: #27 in Norway
- Highest elevation: 1,604.79 m (5,265.1 ft)

Population (1975)
  - Total: 3,757
  - Rank: #254 in Norway
  - Density: 1.7/km^{2} (4.4/sq mi)
  - Change (10 years): ▼ −5%
- Demonym: Tolging or Osing

Official language
  - Norwegian form: Neutral
- Time zone: UTC+01:00 (CET)
  - Summer (DST): UTC+02:00 (CEST)
- ISO 3166 code: NO-0435

Tolga-Os is a former municipality in the old Hedmark county, Norway. The 2,163-square-kilometre (835 sq mi) municipality existed from 1966 until its dissolution in 1976. The area is now part of Tolga Municipality and Os Municipality in the traditional district of Østerdalen. The administrative centre was the village of Tolga. Other villages in the municipality included Dalsbygda, Hodalen, Narbuvoll, Os i Østerdalen, Tufsingdalen, Vingelen, and Øversjødalen.

Prior to its dissolution in 1976, the 2,163-square-kilometre (835 sq mi) municipality was the 27th largest by area out of the 460 municipalities in Norway. Tolga-Os Municipality was the 254th most populous municipality in Norway with a population of about 3,757. The municipality's population density was 1.7 inhabitants per square kilometre (4.4/sq mi) and its population had decreased by 5% over the previous 10-year period.

== General information ==
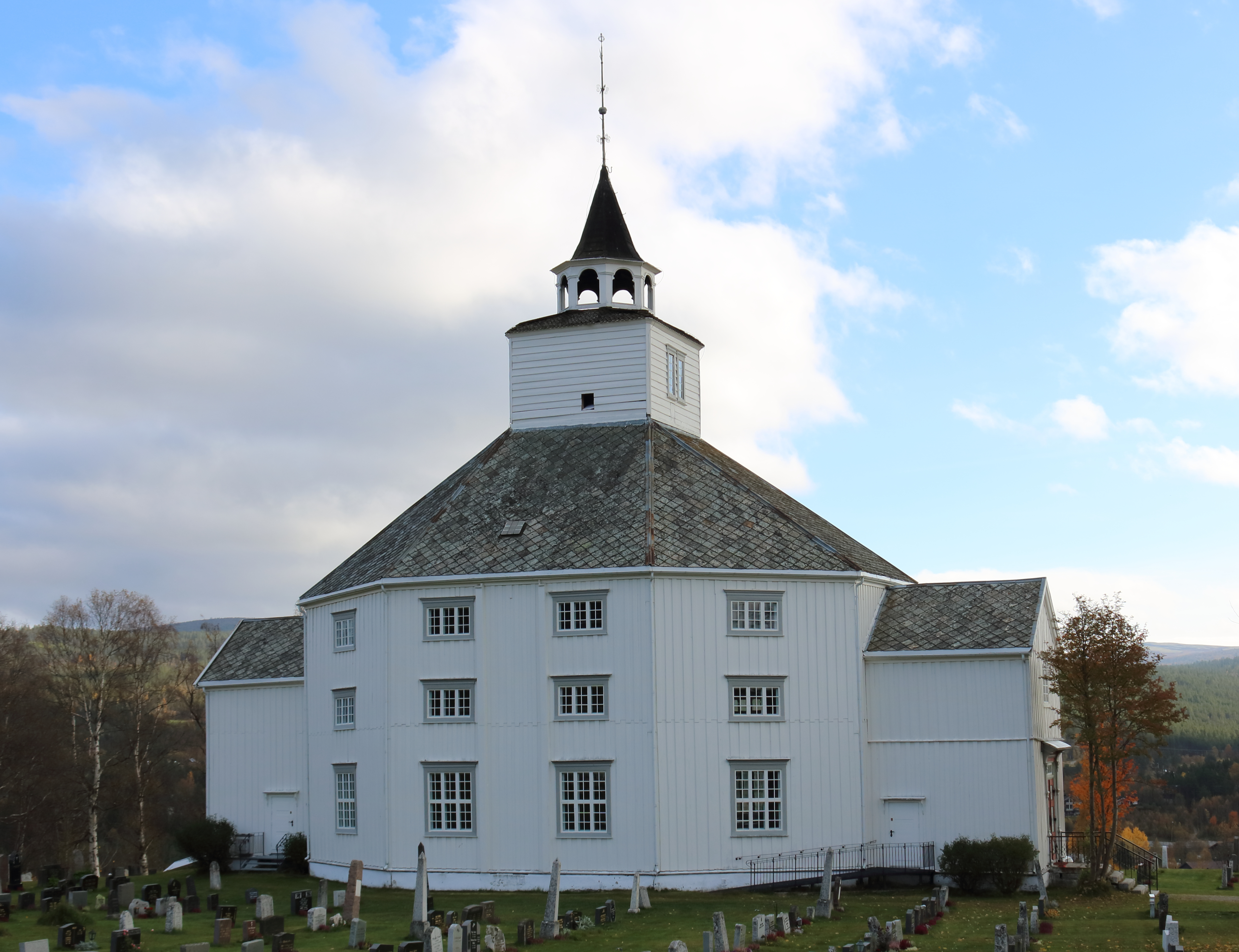
View of Tolga Church, the main church for the municipality

Historically, Tolga Municipality had always included the two parishes of Tolga and Os until 1926 when Os was separated to become the new Os Municipality. During the 1960s, there were many municipal mergers across Norway due to the work of the Schei Committee. On 1 January 1966, Tolga Municipality (population: 1,944) and Os Municipality (population: 2,015) were merged to form the new Tolga-Os Municipality. Soon after the merger, there was discontent in the new municipality. On 10 April 1975, the government allowed the merger to be dissolved, so on 1 January 1976 Tolga (population: 1,865) and Os (population: 1,859) became separate municipalities once again using the pre-1966 borders.

=== Name ===
The municipal name was created during the 1960s (and in use until 1976) for the newly merged municipality that was made up of the old Tolga Municipality and Os Municipality. The name was simply a hyphenated combination of the two old names. The first name comes from the old Tolga farm since the first Tolga Church was built there (in 1688). This name comes from the small river which flows through the area (now known as the river Tolja). The name of the river may come from the word toll (Old Norse: þǫll which means "young pine tree". The second name comes from the old Os farm (Old Norse: Óss) since the first Os Church was built there in 1703. The name is identical with the word óss which means "mouth of a river" (here it is referring to the Vangrøfta river running out into the Glomma river).

=== Churches ===
The Church of Norway had one parish (sokn) within Tolga-Os Municipality. At the time of the municipal dissolution, it was part of the Tolga prestegjeld and the Nord-Østerdal prosti (deanery) in the Diocese of Hamar.

Churches in Tolga-Os
Parish (sokn)	Church name	Location of the church	Year built
Os	Os Church	Os i Østerdalen	1862
Os	Dalsbygda Chapel	Dalsbygda	1960
Os	Narbuvoll Chapel	Narbuvoll	1862
Os	Tufsingdalen Chapel	Tufsingdalen	1920
Tolga	Tolga Church	Tolga	1840
Tolga	Hodalen Church	Hodalen	1934
Tolga	Holøydalen Church	Øversjødalen	1908
Vingelen	Vingelen Church	Vingelen	1880

== Geography ==
The municipality was located in the northeastern part of Hedmark county, along the border with Sør-Trøndelag county. Engerdal Municipality was to the southeast, Rendalen Municipality was to the southwest, Tynset Municipality was to the west, Midtre Gauldal Municipality was to the northwest (in Sør-Trøndelag), Holtålen Municipality was to the north (in Sør-Trøndelag), and Røros Municipality was to the east (in Sør-Trøndelag). The highest point in the municipality was the 1,604.79-metre (5,265.1 ft) tall mountain Elgspiggen, located on the southern border with Rendalen Municipality.

== Government ==
While it existed, Tolga-Os Municipality was responsible for primary education (through 10th grade), outpatient health services, senior citizen services, welfare and other social services, zoning, economic development, and municipal roads and utilities. The municipality was governed by a municipal council of directly elected representatives. The mayor was indirectly elected by a vote of the municipal council. The municipality was under the jurisdiction of the Eidsivating Court of Appeal.

=== Municipal council ===
The municipal council (Kommunestyre) of Tolga-Os was made up of 25 representatives that were elected to four year terms. The tables below show the historical composition of the council by political party.

Tolga-Os kommunestyre 1971–1975
Party name (in Norwegian)	Number of representatives
Labour Party (Arbeiderpartiet)	9
Christian Democratic Party (Kristelig Folkeparti)	1
Centre Party (Senterpartiet)	13
Liberal Party (Venstre)	2
Total number of members:	25
Note: On 1 January 1976, Tolga-Os Municipality was divided into Tolga Municipality and Os Municipality.

Tolga-Os kommunestyre 1967–1971
Party name (in Norwegian)	Number of representatives
Labour Party (Arbeiderpartiet)	9
Centre Party (Senterpartiet)	14
Liberal Party (Venstre)	2
Total number of members:	25

Tolga-Os kommunestyre 1966–1967
Party name (in Norwegian)	Number of representatives
Labour Party (Arbeiderpartiet)	13
Centre Party (Senterpartiet)	18
Liberal Party (Venstre)	3
Total number of members:	34
Note: This first council for Tolga-Os Municipality was established in 1966 and it was made up of the existing councils from the old Tolga Municipality and Os Municipality that took office in 1964.

=== Mayors ===
The mayor (Norwegian: ordfører) of Tolga-Os was the political leader of the municipality and the chairperson of the municipal council. The following people held this position:

- 1966–1967: Olav Hummelvold
- 1967–1971: Anders Johnsgård (Sp)
- 1971–1975: Lars Solbu (Sp)

== See also ==
- List of former municipalities of Norway
