= Siksjøen =

Lake in Innlandet, Norway

- Interactive map of the lake
- Location: Os Municipality, Innlandet
- Coordinates: 62.32513°N 11.63649°E
- Primary inflows: Holleva river
- Primary outflows: Tufsinga river
- Basin countries: Norway
- Max. length: 6 kilometres (3.7 mi)
- Max. width: 600 metres (2,000 ft)
- Surface area: 2.69 km^{2} (1.04 sq mi)
- Shore length^{1}: 13.72 kilometres (8.53 mi)
- Surface elevation: 708 metres (2,323 ft)
- References: NVE
- ^{1} Shore length is not a well-defined measure.

Siksjøen is a lake in Os Municipality in Innlandet county, Norway. The 2.69-square-kilometre (1.04 sq mi) lake is located in the Tufsingdalen valley in the southeastern part of the municipality, about 25 kilometres (16 mi) southeast of the village of Os. The lake is very long and narrow, measuring 6 kilometres (3.7 mi) long, but only about 600 metres (0.4 mi) wide at its widest.

== See also ==
- List of lakes in Norway
