= Narbuvoll =

Village in Os Municipality, Norway

- Village
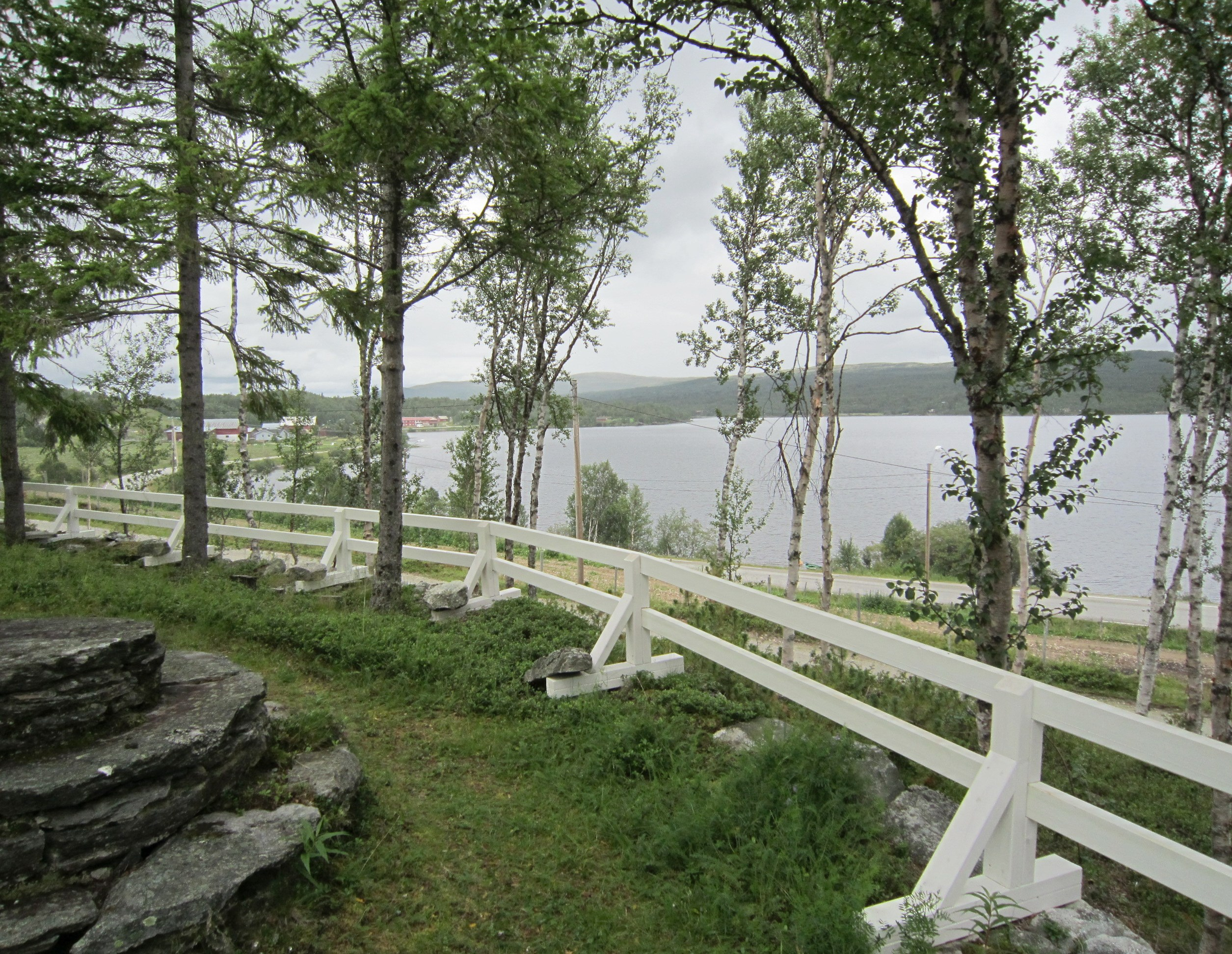
- View of the village area
- Interactive map of Narbuvoll
- Location within Innlandet Location within Norway
- Coordinates: 62.3544°N 11.46751°E
- Country: Norway
- Region: Eastern Norway
- County: Innlandet
- District: Østerdalen
- Municipality: Os Municipality
- Elevation: 738 m (2,421 ft)
- Time zone: UTC+01:00 (CET)
  - Summer (DST): UTC+02:00 (CEST)
- Post Code: 2550 Os i Østerdalen

Narbuvoll is a village in Os Municipality in Innlandet county, Norway. The village is located on the shores of the lake Narsjøen, about 25 kilometres (16 mi) southeast of the village of Os i Østerdalen. The large mountain Håmmålsfjellet lies between the villages of Narbuvoll and Os i Østerdalen. The Tufsingdalen valley lies to the southeast of Narbuvoll.

Narbuvoll Church is located in the village.

== History ==
During the 1600s, the area was used for forestry, with a lot of the trees being cut down to be used at the smelter in Tolga, so by the early 1700s, the area was cleared with few forests remaining. Today's village area was first settled in 1732 when two married couples moved to the area to start a farm. They were from Vingelen in Tolga. Historically, the people of Vingelen had farming and fishing rights to the areas around the lake Narsjøen, but no one lived there year-round. At its peak, there were 10 farms operating in the village, but that has since declined.
