= Os Municipality (Innlandet) =

Municipality in Innlandet, Norway

Os Municipality Os kommune
- Municipality
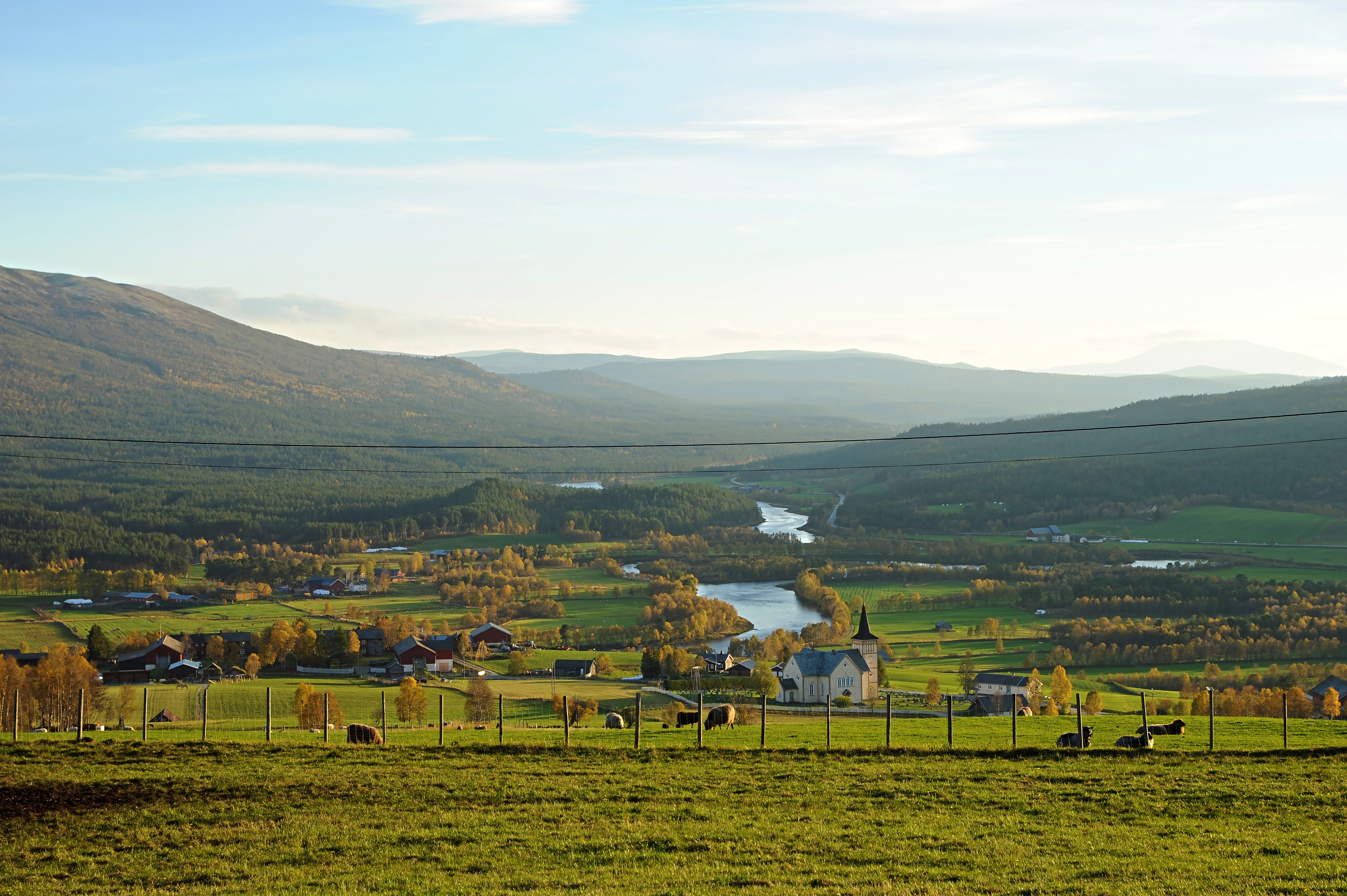
- View of Os i Østerdalen

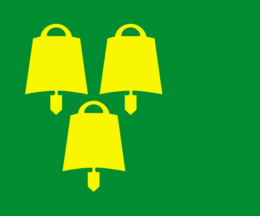
- Flag Coat of arms

- Innlandet within Norway

- Os within Innlandet
- Coordinates: 62°28′34″N 11°14′35″E
- Country: Norway
- County: Innlandet
- District: Østerdalen
- Established: 1 July 1926
  - Preceded by: Tolga Municipality
- Disestablished: 1 Jan 1966
  - Succeeded by: Tolga-Os Municipality
- Re-established: 1 Jan 1976
  - Preceded by: Tolga-Os Municipality
- Administrative centre: Os i Østerdalen

Government
  - Mayor (2023): Ivar Midtdal (Sp)

Area
  - Total: 1,040.40 km^{2} (401.70 sq mi)
  - Land: 1,006.74 km^{2} (388.70 sq mi)
  - Water: 33.66 km^{2} (13.00 sq mi) 3.2%
  - Rank: #110 in Norway
- Highest elevation: 1,592.91 m (5,226.1 ft)

Population (2025)
  - Total: 1,895
  - Rank: #289 in Norway
  - Density: 1.8/km^{2} (4.7/sq mi)
  - Change (10 years): ▼ −6.1%
- Demonym: Osing

Official language
  - Norwegian form: Neutral
- Time zone: UTC+01:00 (CET)
  - Summer (DST): UTC+02:00 (CEST)
- ISO 3166 code: NO-3430
- Website: Official website

Os is a municipality in Innlandet county, Norway. It is located in the traditional district of Østerdalen. The administrative centre of the municipality is the village of Os i Østerdalen. Other villages in the municipality include Dalsbygda, Narbuvoll, and Tufsingdalen.

The 1,040-square-kilometre (400 sq mi) municipality is the 110th largest by area out of the 357 municipalities in Norway. Os Municipality is the 289th most populous municipality in Norway with a population of 1,895. The municipality's population density is 1.8 inhabitants per square kilometre (4.7/sq mi) and its population has decreased by 6.1% over the previous 10-year period.

== General information ==
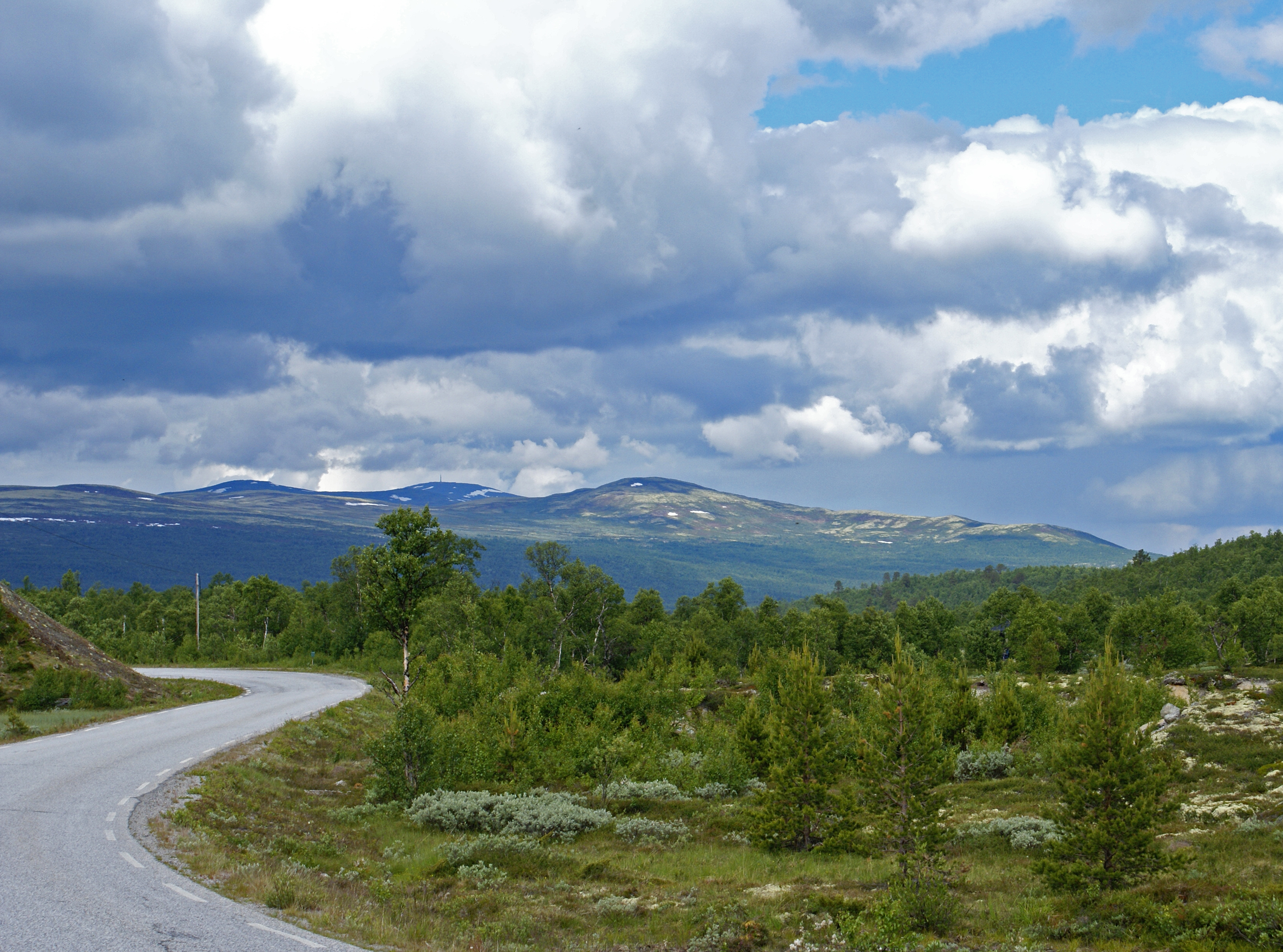
View of the Os area

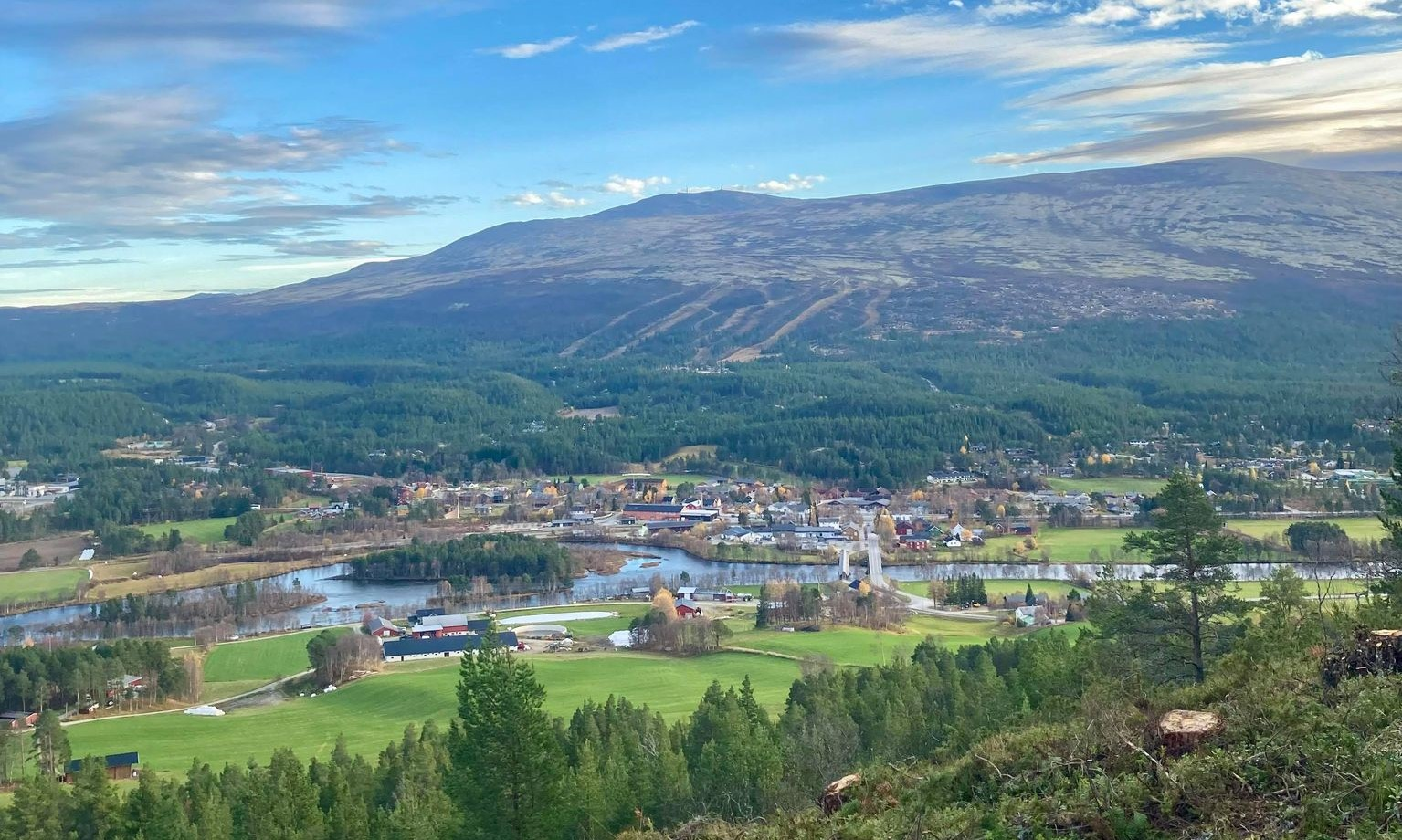
View of the village of Os i Østerdalen

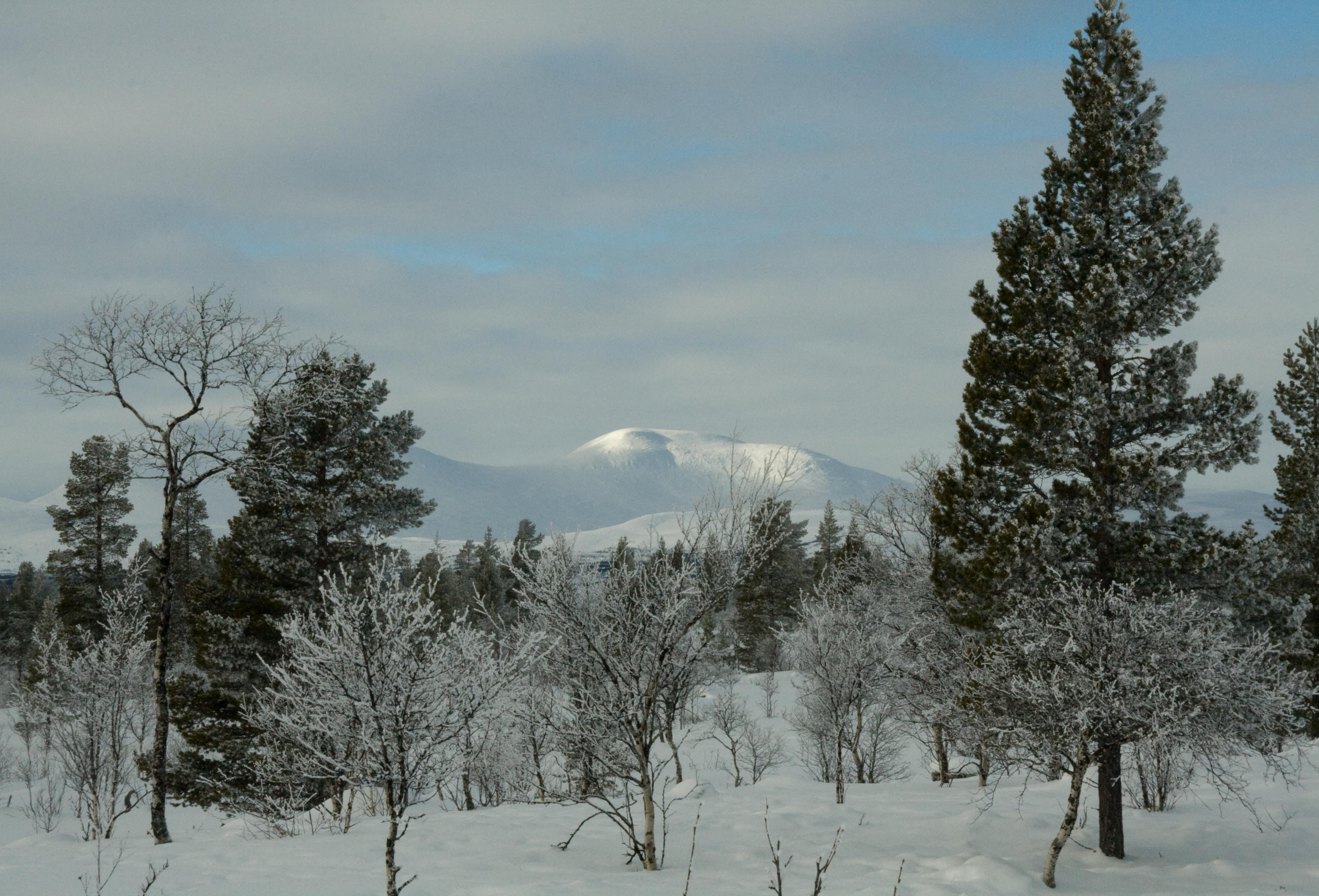
View of Tufsingdalen in the winter

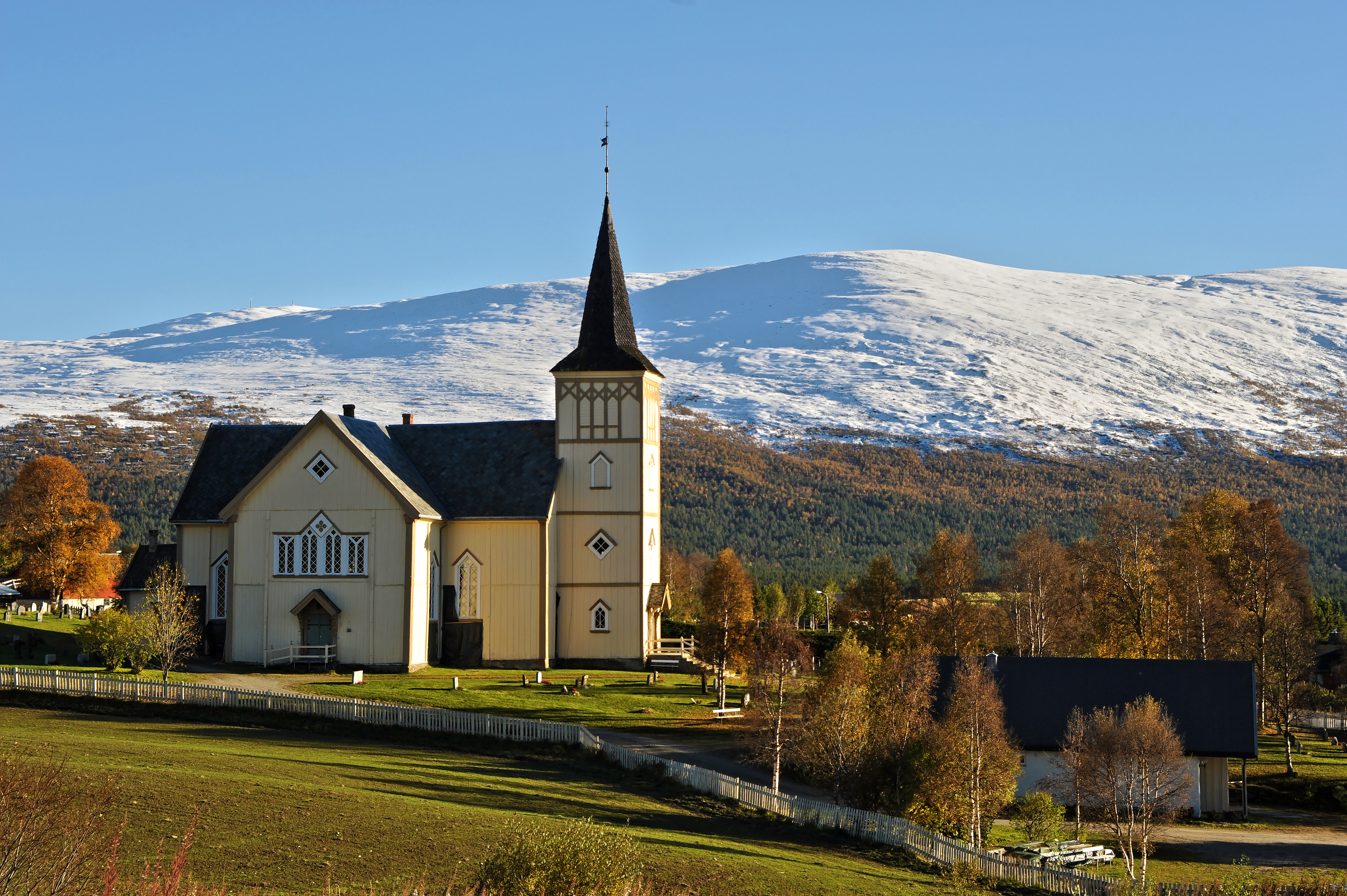
Os Church and Mount Hummelfjellet

The parish of Os was historically part of Tolga Municipality. On 1 July 1926, the parish of Os (population: 1,936) was separated from Tolga Municipality to become a separate municipality. In 1927, a small area of Tolga Municipality (population: 18) was transferred to Os Municipality. During the 1960s, there were many municipal mergers across Norway due to the work of the Schei Committee. On 1 January 1966, Os Municipality (population: 2,015) was merged with Tolga Municipality (population: 1,944) to form the new Tolga-Os Municipality. This arrangement was not well-liked by the local residents so after a few years, the municipalities began to ask to undo the merger. On 1 January 1976, the merger was reversed and Os Municipality (population: 1,859) and Tolga Municipality (population: 1,865) were re-established using their old boundaries.

Historically, the municipality was part of Hedmark county. On 1 January 2020, the municipality became a part of the newly-formed Innlandet county (after Hedmark and Oppland counties were merged).

=== Name ===
The municipality (originally the parish) is named after the old Os farm (Old Norse: Óss) since the first Os Church was built there in 1703. The name is identical with the word óss which means "mouth of a river" (here it is referring to the Vangrøfta river running out into the Glomma river).

=== Coat of arms ===
The coat of arms was granted on 9 July 1993. The official blazon is "Vert, three bells Or" (Norwegian: I grønt tre gull bjeller, 2-1). This means the arms have a green field (background) and the charge is three cowbells (two over one). The charge has a tincture of Or which means it is commonly colored yellow, but if it is made out of metal, then gold is used. The design symbolizes both traditional and modern business life in the mountain municipality of Os. At the same time, the design is intended to signal hope for the future. The three bells are an image of unity and cooperation between the three main parts of the municipality. The arms were designed by Kjell Akeren. The municipal flag has the same design as the coat of arms, although the bells are slightly off centre, closer to the flagpole.

=== Churches ===
The Church of Norway has three parishes (sokn) within Os Municipality. It is part of the Nord-Østerdal prosti (deanery) in the Diocese of Hamar.

Churches in Os
Parish (sokn)	Church name	Location of the church	Year built
Dalsbygda	Dalsbygda Church	Dalsbygda	1960
Narbuvoll	Narbuvoll Church	Narbuvoll	1862
Narbuvoll	Tufsingdalen Church	Tufsingdalen	1920
Os	Os Church	Os i Østerdalen	1862

== Government ==
Os Municipality is responsible for primary education (through 10th grade), outpatient health services, senior citizen services, welfare and other social services, zoning, economic development, and municipal roads and utilities. The municipality is governed by a municipal council of directly elected representatives. The mayor is indirectly elected by a vote of the municipal council. The municipality is under the jurisdiction of the Hedmarken og Østerdal District Court and the Eidsivating Court of Appeal.

=== Municipal council ===
The municipal council (Kommunestyre) of Os Municipality is made up of 15 representatives that are elected to four year terms. The tables below show the current and historical composition of the council by political party.

Os kommunestyre 2023–2027
Party name (in Norwegian)	Number of representatives
Labour Party (Arbeiderpartiet)	6
Christian Democratic Party (Kristelig Folkeparti)	1
Centre Party (Senterpartiet)	7
Socialist Left Party (Sosialistisk Venstreparti)	1
Total number of members:	15

Os kommunestyre 2019–2023
Party name (in Norwegian)	Number of representatives
Labour Party (Arbeiderpartiet)	4
Christian Democratic Party (Kristelig Folkeparti)	1
Centre Party (Senterpartiet)	8
Socialist Left Party (Sosialistisk Venstreparti)	2
Total number of members:	15

Os kommunestyre 2015–2019
Party name (in Norwegian)	Number of representatives
Labour Party (Arbeiderpartiet)	5
Christian Democratic Party (Kristelig Folkeparti)	1
Centre Party (Senterpartiet)	9
Socialist Left Party (Sosialistisk Venstreparti)	2
Total number of members:	17

Os kommunestyre 2011–2015
Party name (in Norwegian)	Number of representatives
Labour Party (Arbeiderpartiet)	6
Centre Party (Senterpartiet)	13
Socialist Left Party (Sosialistisk Venstreparti)	2
Total number of members:	21

Os kommunestyre 2007–2011
Party name (in Norwegian)	Number of representatives
Labour Party (Arbeiderpartiet)	8
Centre Party (Senterpartiet)	10
Socialist Left Party (Sosialistisk Venstreparti)	3
Total number of members:	21

Os kommunestyre 2003–2007
Party name (in Norwegian)	Number of representatives
Labour Party (Arbeiderpartiet)	8
Christian Democratic Party (Kristelig Folkeparti)	1
Centre Party (Senterpartiet)	9
Socialist Left Party (Sosialistisk Venstreparti)	3
Total number of members:	21

Os kommunestyre 1999–2003
Party name (in Norwegian)	Number of representatives
Labour Party (Arbeiderpartiet)	7
Christian Democratic Party (Kristelig Folkeparti)	1
Centre Party (Senterpartiet)	11
Socialist Left Party (Sosialistisk Venstreparti)	2
Total number of members:	21

Os kommunestyre 1995–1999
Party name (in Norwegian)	Number of representatives
Labour Party (Arbeiderpartiet)	8
Christian Democratic Party (Kristelig Folkeparti)	1
Centre Party (Senterpartiet)	10
Socialist Left Party (Sosialistisk Venstreparti)	2
Total number of members:	21

Os kommunestyre 1991–1995
Party name (in Norwegian)	Number of representatives
Labour Party (Arbeiderpartiet)	8
Christian Democratic Party (Kristelig Folkeparti)	1
Centre Party (Senterpartiet)	9
Socialist Left Party (Sosialistisk Venstreparti)	3
Total number of members:	21

Os kommunestyre 1987–1991
Party name (in Norwegian)	Number of representatives
Labour Party (Arbeiderpartiet)	8
Christian Democratic Party (Kristelig Folkeparti)	1
Centre Party (Senterpartiet)	6
Socialist Left Party (Sosialistisk Venstreparti)	2
Total number of members:	17

Os kommunestyre 1983–1987
Party name (in Norwegian)	Number of representatives
Labour Party (Arbeiderpartiet)	10
Christian Democratic Party (Kristelig Folkeparti)	1
Centre Party (Senterpartiet)	6
Total number of members:	17

Os kommunestyre 1979–1983
Party name (in Norwegian)	Number of representatives
Labour Party (Arbeiderpartiet)	10
Conservative Party (Høyre)	1
Christian Democratic Party (Kristelig Folkeparti)	1
Centre Party (Senterpartiet)	5
Total number of members:	17

Os kommunestyre 1976–1979
Party name (in Norwegian)	Number of representatives
Labour Party (Arbeiderpartiet)	8
Christian Democratic Party (Kristelig Folkeparti)	1
Centre Party (Senterpartiet)	8
Total number of members:	17

Os kommunestyre 1963–1965*
Party name (in Norwegian)	Number of representatives
Labour Party (Arbeiderpartiet)	8
Centre Party (Senterpartiet)	8
Liberal Party (Venstre)	1
Total number of members:	17
Note: On 1 Jan 1966, Os Municipality became part of Tolga-Os Municipality. On 1 Jan 1976, this merger was undone and Os became a separate municipality once again.

Os herredsstyre 1959–1963
Party name (in Norwegian)	Number of representatives
Labour Party (Arbeiderpartiet)	8
Centre Party (Senterpartiet)	8
Liberal Party (Venstre)	1
Total number of members:	17

Os herredsstyre 1955–1959
Party name (in Norwegian)	Number of representatives
Labour Party (Arbeiderpartiet)	8
Farmers' Party (Bondepartiet)	9
Total number of members:	17

Os herredsstyre 1951–1955
Party name (in Norwegian)	Number of representatives
Labour Party (Arbeiderpartiet)	7
Farmers' Party (Bondepartiet)	7
Liberal Party (Venstre)	2
Total number of members:	16

Os herredsstyre 1947–1951
Party name (in Norwegian)	Number of representatives
Labour Party (Arbeiderpartiet)	5
Communist Party (Kommunistiske Parti)	1
Joint List(s) of Non-Socialist Parties (Borgerlige Felleslister)	10
Total number of members:	16

Os herredsstyre 1945–1947
Party name (in Norwegian)	Number of representatives
Labour Party (Arbeiderpartiet)	6
Joint List(s) of Non-Socialist Parties (Borgerlige Felleslister)	10
Total number of members:	16

Os herredsstyre 1937–1941*
Party name (in Norwegian)	Number of representatives
Labour Party (Arbeiderpartiet)	6
Joint List(s) of Non-Socialist Parties (Borgerlige Felleslister)	10
Total number of members:	16
Note: Due to the German occupation of Norway during World War II, no elections were held for new municipal councils until after the war ended in 1945.

=== Mayors ===
The mayor (Norwegian: ordfører) of Os Municipality is the political leader of the municipality and the chairperson of the municipal council. Here is a list of people who have held this position:

- 1926–1931: Hans Narjord (V)
- 1932–1934: Sigvart Odden (Bp)
- 1935–1937: Hans Narjord (V)
- 1938–1940: Sigvart Odden (Bp)
- 1941–1945: Jørgen Øian (NS)
- 1945–1955: Olav Hummelvold (Bp)
- 1956–1959: John Holm (Bp)
- 1960–1965: Olav Hummelvold (Bp)
- (1966–1975: Part of Tolga-Os Municipality)
- 1976–1985: Tore Christoffersen (Ap)
- 1986–1993: Inge Kroken (Ap)
- 1995–2007: Arnfinn Nergård (Sp)
- 2007–2011: Arne Grue (Ap)
- 2011–2015: Arnfinn Nergård (Sp)
- 2015–2023: Runa Finborud (Sp)
- 2023–present: Ivar Midtdal (Sp)

== Geography ==
Lakes in the region include Flensjøen, Femunden, and Siksjøen. The large river Glomma runs through the northern part of the municipality. The highest point in the municipality is the 1,592.91-metre (5,226.1 ft) tall mountain Nordre Sålekinna, on the border with Tolga Municipality. Other mountains in the municipality include Forollhogna and Håmmålsfjellet.

The municipality is located to the northeastern part of the county, along the border with Trøndelag county. Røros Municipality is to the east (in Trøndelag), Midtre Gauldal Municipality and Holtålen Municipality are to the north (also in Trøndelag), and Tolga Municipality is to the west, and Engerdal Municipality is to the south.

== Notable people ==
- Arnfinn Nergård (born 1952), a Norwegian politician who was mayor of Os Municipality and also county mayor of Hedmark county

=== Sport ===
- Annar Ryen (1909 in Os – 1985), a cross-country skier
- Viggo Sundmoen (born 1954 in Os), a former footballer with 150 club caps
- Randi Langøigjelten (born 1957), a retired middle-distance runner
- Therese Johaug (born 1988 in Os), a cross-country skier and three-time Olympic medallist
- Jon Aukrust Osmoen (born 1992 in Os), an orienteering competitor
