= Narbuvoll Church =

Church in Innlandet, Norway

- Narbuvoll kirke
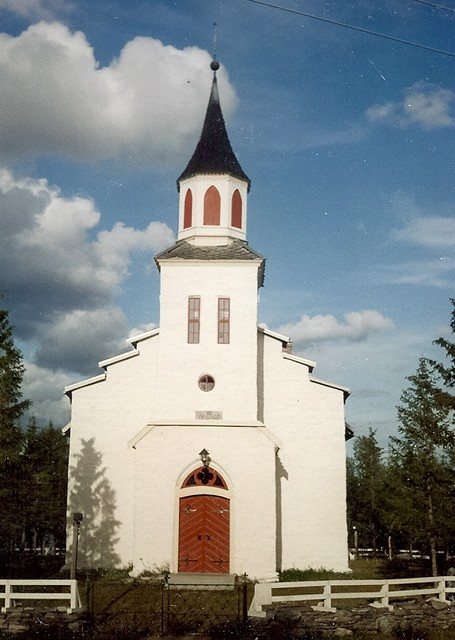
- View of the church
- Narbuvoll Church
- 62°21′03″N 11°28′03″E
- Location: Os Municipality, Innlandet
- Country: Norway
- Denomination: Church of Norway
- Churchmanship: Evangelical Lutheran

History
- Status: Parish church
- Founded: 1862
- Consecrated: 2 November 1862

Architecture
- Functional status: Active
- Architect: Christian Heinrich Grosch
- Architectural type: Long church
- Completed: 1862 (164 years ago)

Specifications
- Capacity: 150
- Materials: Stone

Administration
- Diocese: Hamar bispedømme
- Deanery: Nord-Østerdal prosti
- Parish: Narbuvoll
- Norwegian Cultural Heritage Site
- Type: Church
- Status: Listed
- ID: 85093

Narbuvoll Church (Norwegian: Narbuvoll kirke) is a parish church of the Church of Norway in Os Municipality in Innlandet county, Norway. It is located in the village of Narbuvoll. It is one of the churches for the Narbuvoll parish which is part of the Nord-Østerdal prosti (deanery) in the Diocese of Hamar. The white, stone church was built in a long church design in 1862 using plans drawn up by the architect Christian Heinrich Grosch. The church seats about 150 people. It is the only stone church in all of the Nord-Østerdal prosti.

== History ==
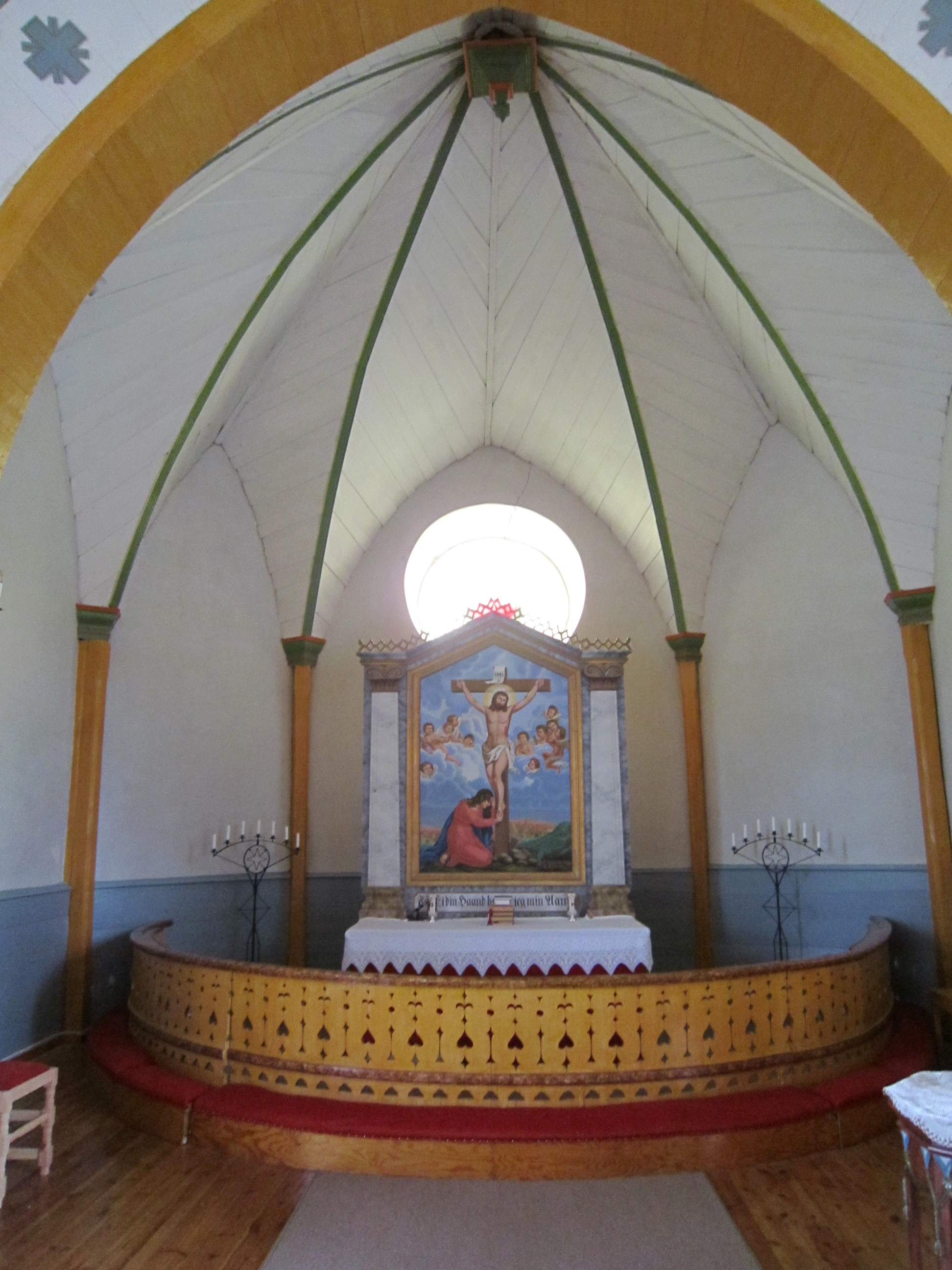
View of the choir inside the church

The people living in the southern part of the valley in Os had long desired a church near them. In the 1860s, plans were made to build a church in Narbuvoll. A local man named Ingebret Mikkelsen Narbuvoll donated land for a church. Christian Heinrich Grosch designed a stone church for the site and Knut Skancke was hired as the lead builder. The new church was consecrated on 2 November 1862 (two days after the nearby Os Church was consecrated). Originally, the church seated about 200 people. In the 1960s, the second floor seating gallery was removed which lowered the capacity to about 150 people.

== See also ==
- List of churches in Hamar
