= Jon Aukrust Osmoen =

Norwegian orienteer (born 1992)

Personal information
- Born: 1992 (age 33–34) Os, Hedmark, Norway

Sport
- Sport: Orienteering
- Club: Nydalens SK
Medal record
Men's orienteering
Representing Norway
Junior World Championships
Bronze medal – third place	2012 Košice	Relay

Jon Aukrust Osmoen (born 1992) is a Norwegian orienteering competitor. He was born in Os Municipality in Hedmark county. He won a bronze medal in the relay at the 2012 Junior World Orienteering Championships in Košice with the Norwegian team. He competed at the 2018 World Orienteering Championships in Latvia, where he qualified for the sprint final but placed 30th.
