= Siri Austeng =

Norwegian politician (1944–2017)

Siri Austeng (27 April 1944 – 8 July 2017) was a Norwegian politician for the Labour Party.

She served as a deputy representative to the Norwegian Parliament from Hedmark during the term 1985–1989.

Following the 1995 elections, Austeng became the new county mayor (fylkesordfører) of Hedmark. She stepped down before the 2007 election.

She died on 8 July 2017 at the age of 73.

Preceded by ?	County mayor of Hedmark; 1995–2007	Succeeded by Arnfinn Nergård
