= Arnfinn Nergård =

Norwegian politician (born 1952)

Arnfinn Nergård (born 4 April 1952) is a Norwegian politician for the Centre Party.

He served as a deputy representative to the Parliament of Norway from Hedmark during the terms 2005–2009, 2009–2013 and 2013–2017. In total he met during 48 days of parliamentary session.

Following the 2007 elections, Nergård became the new county mayor (fylkesordfører) of Hedmark. Before this, he was the mayor of Os Municipality. After the 2011 elections Nergård returned to Os as mayor. He lasted one term, until 2015.

In 2018, following the downfall of county mayor Dag Rønning, Nergård was selected by the county council for a second tenure as county mayor.

Political offices
Preceded by Siri Austeng	County mayor of Hedmark; 2007–2011	Succeeded by Dag Rønning
Preceded by Dag Rønning	County mayor of Hedmark; 2018–2020	Position abolished Hedmark became part of Innlandet
