= Dalsbygda Church =

Church in Innlandet, Norway

- Dalsbygda kirke
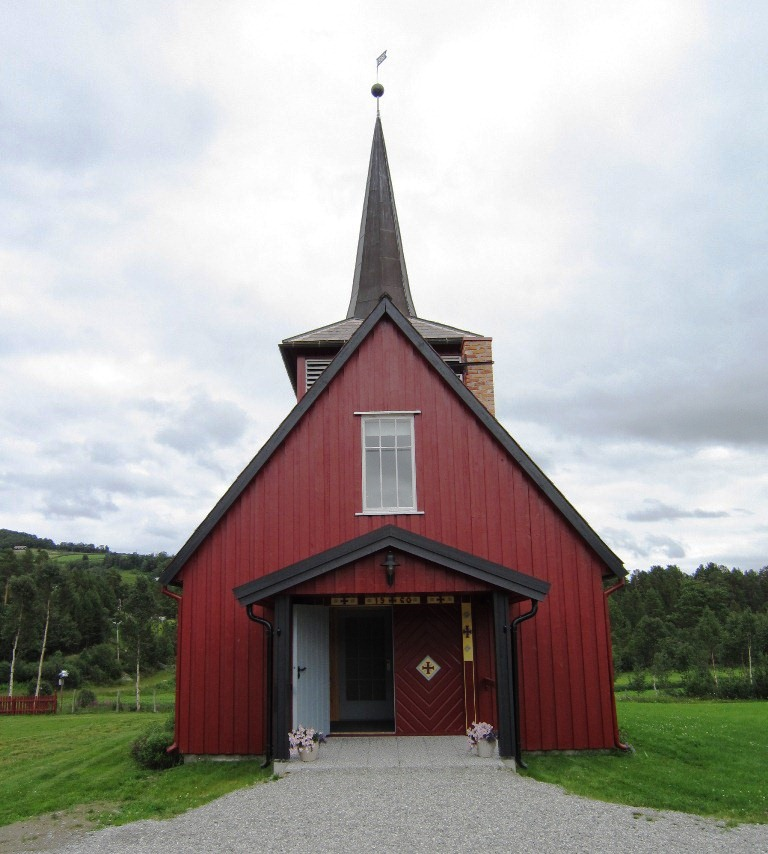
- View of the church
- Dalsbygda Church
- 62°31′34″N 11°06′31″E
- Location: Os Municipality, Innlandet
- Country: Norway
- Denomination: Church of Norway
- Churchmanship: Evangelical Lutheran

History
- Former name: Dalsbygda kapell
- Status: Parish church
- Founded: 1960
- Consecrated: 30 October 1960

Architecture
- Functional status: Active
- Architect: Jens Ormhaug
- Architectural type: Long church
- Completed: 1960 (66 years ago)

Specifications
- Capacity: 250
- Materials: Wood

Administration
- Diocese: Hamar bispedømme
- Deanery: Nord-Østerdal prosti
- Parish: Dalsbygda

Dalsbygda Church (Norwegian: Dalsbygda kirke) is a parish church of the Church of Norway in Os Municipality in Innlandet county, Norway. It is located in the village of Dalsbygda. It is the church for the Dalsbygda parish which is part of the Nord-Østerdal prosti (deanery) in the Diocese of Hamar. The red, wooden church was built in a long church design in 1960 using plans drawn up by the architect Jens Ormhaug. The church seats about 250 people.

== History ==
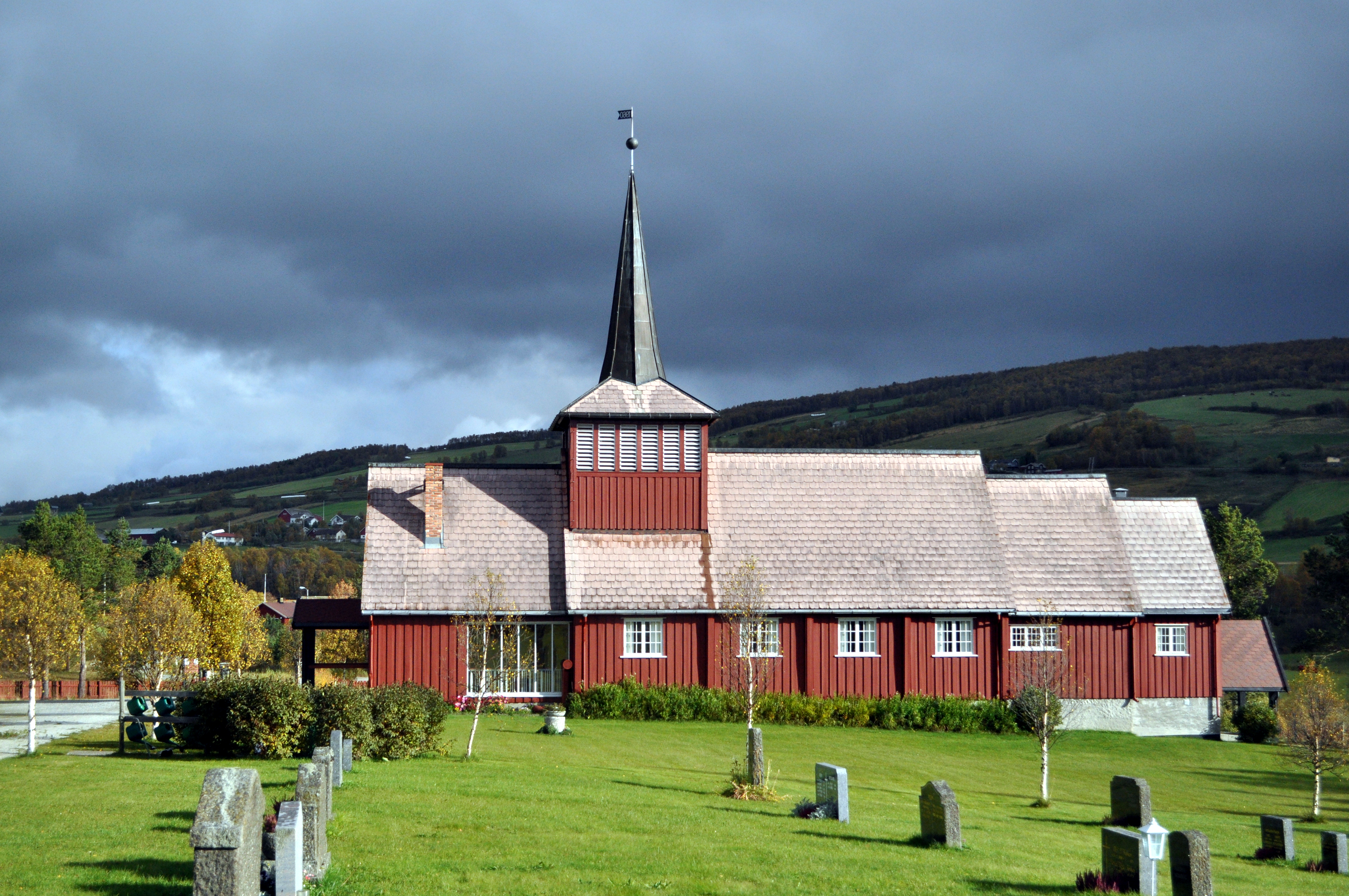
View of the church

In 1908, the cemetery at the nearby Os Church needed more room, but had no room to expand. A site in the village of Dalsbygda was chosen. The cemetery was fenced, a chapel erected, and a bell installed at the new site and it was all consecrated on 17 October 1910. In 1951, the Tolga prestegjeld (which included Tolga Municipality and Os Municipality) hired a full time priest to work in Os. The new priest began to hold services in Dalsbygda at the small chapel and discussions ensued about whether or not to build a church there. Drawings for a new wooden long church were prepared by Jens Ormhaug, and the construction manager was Melkor Henningsmo. The new church was built in 1960. It was consecrated on 30 October 1960 by the Bishop Kristian Vilhelm Koren Schjelderup Jr. For the first 10 years, there were no church bells in the church; the bells at the neighboring burial chapel were used instead. In 1970, a large new bell tower was built above the nave of the church. The new tower was consecrated on 25 October 1970. In 1978, a new sacristy was added onto the church. On 2 November 1981, the church was upgraded to the status of parish church (prior to that time, it had been a annex chapel under the nearby Os Church).

== See also ==
- List of churches in Hamar
