= Dalsbygda =

Village in Os Municipality, Norway

- Village
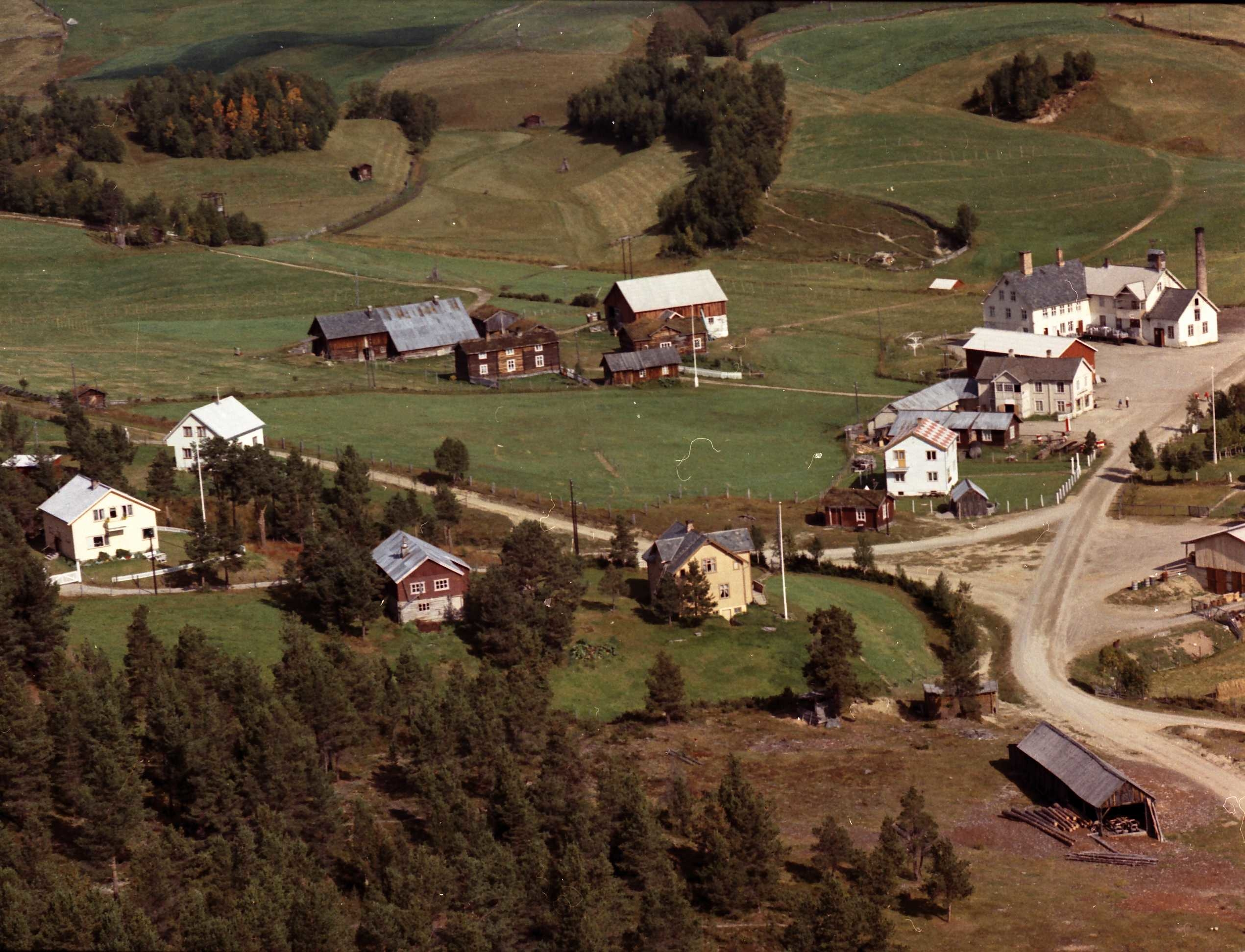
- View of the village
- Interactive map of Dalsbygda
- Location within Innlandet Location within Norway
- Coordinates: 62.5278°N 11.10869°E
- Country: Norway
- Region: Eastern Norway
- County: Innlandet
- District: Østerdalen
- Municipality: Os Municipality
- Elevation: 641 m (2,103 ft)
- Time zone: UTC+01:00 (CET)
  - Summer (DST): UTC+02:00 (CEST)
- Post Code: 2552 Dalsbygda

Dalsbygda is a village in Os Municipality in Innlandet county, Norway. The village is located about 7.5 kilometres (4.7 mi) northwest of the village of Os i Østerdalen in the northwestern part of the municipality. There are about 600 people who live in the village and surrounding area. The area is characterized by agriculture, particularly with dairy production.

The Forollhogna National Park lies about 10 kilometres (6.2 mi) to the north and west of the village. Dalsbygda Church is located in the village.

== Notable people ==
- Annar Ryen
- Therese Johaug
- Arnljot Nyaas
