= Tufsingdalen Church =

Church in Innlandet, Norway

- Tufsingdalen kirke
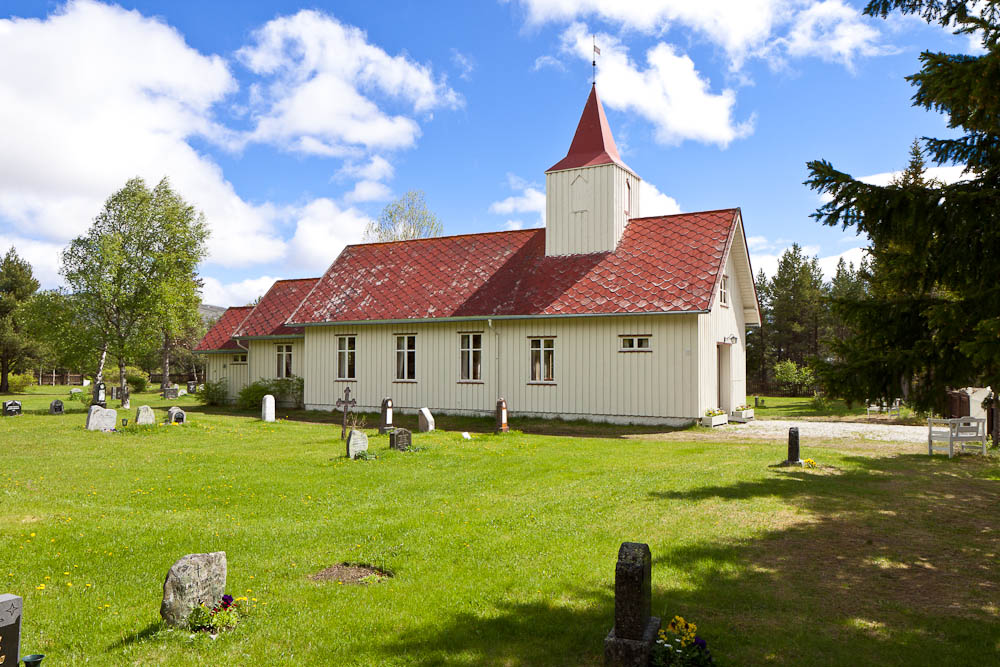
- View of the church
- Tufsingdalen Church
- 62°18′12″N 11°43′12″E
- Location: Os Municipality, Innlandet
- Country: Norway
- Denomination: Church of Norway
- Churchmanship: Evangelical Lutheran

History
- Status: Parish church
- Founded: 1920
- Consecrated: 1920

Architecture
- Functional status: Active
- Architect: Peder Sæther
- Architectural type: Long church
- Completed: 1920 (106 years ago)

Specifications
- Capacity: 120
- Materials: Wood

Administration
- Diocese: Hamar bispedømme
- Deanery: Nord-Østerdal prosti
- Parish: Narbuvoll
- Norwegian Cultural Heritage Site
- Type: Church
- Status: Not protected
- ID: 85093

Tufsingdalen Church (Norwegian: Tufsingdalen kirke) is a parish church of the Church of Norway in Os Municipality in Innlandet county, Norway. It is located in the village of Tufsingdal. It is one of the churches for the Narbuvoll parish which is part of the Nord-Østerdal prosti (deanery) in the Diocese of Hamar. The white, wooden church was built in a long church design in 1920 using plans drawn up by the architect Peder Sæther. The church seats about 120 people.

== History ==
A burial ground was consecrated on this site in October 1914. Then a burial chapel was constructed on the site in 1918. In 1920, the small chapel was enlarged by adding a choir and sacristy. The architect Peder Sæther designed the building. The newly enlarged building was consecrated in 1920. In 1923, a second floor seating gallery was added. Originally, the church was considered an annex chapel, but in the 1970s, the chapel was renovated and upgraded to the status of parish church. Historically, the church was painted brown, but now it is white.

== Media gallery ==
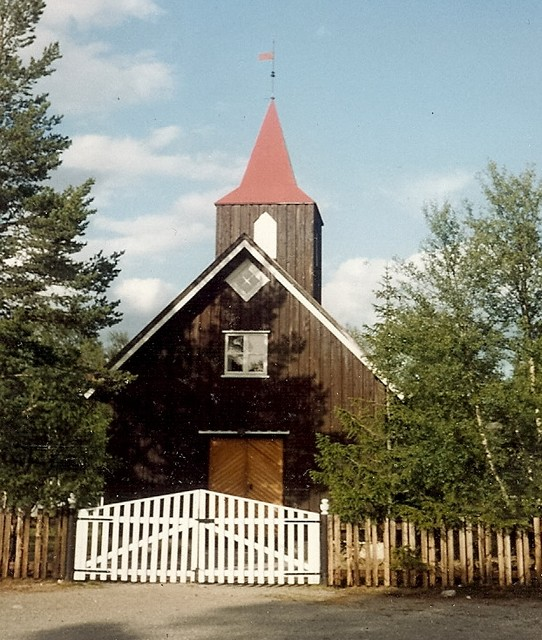
View of the front exterior

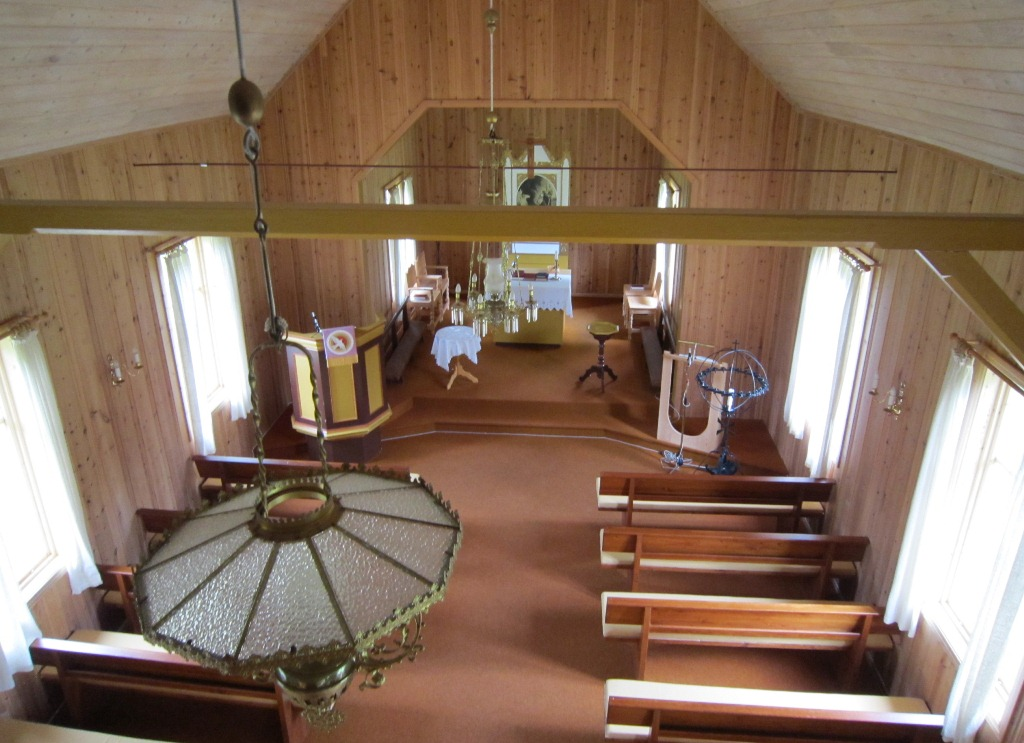
View of the interior

== See also ==
- List of churches in Hamar
