= Håmmålsfjellet =

Mountain in Innlandet, Norway

- Gråhøgda
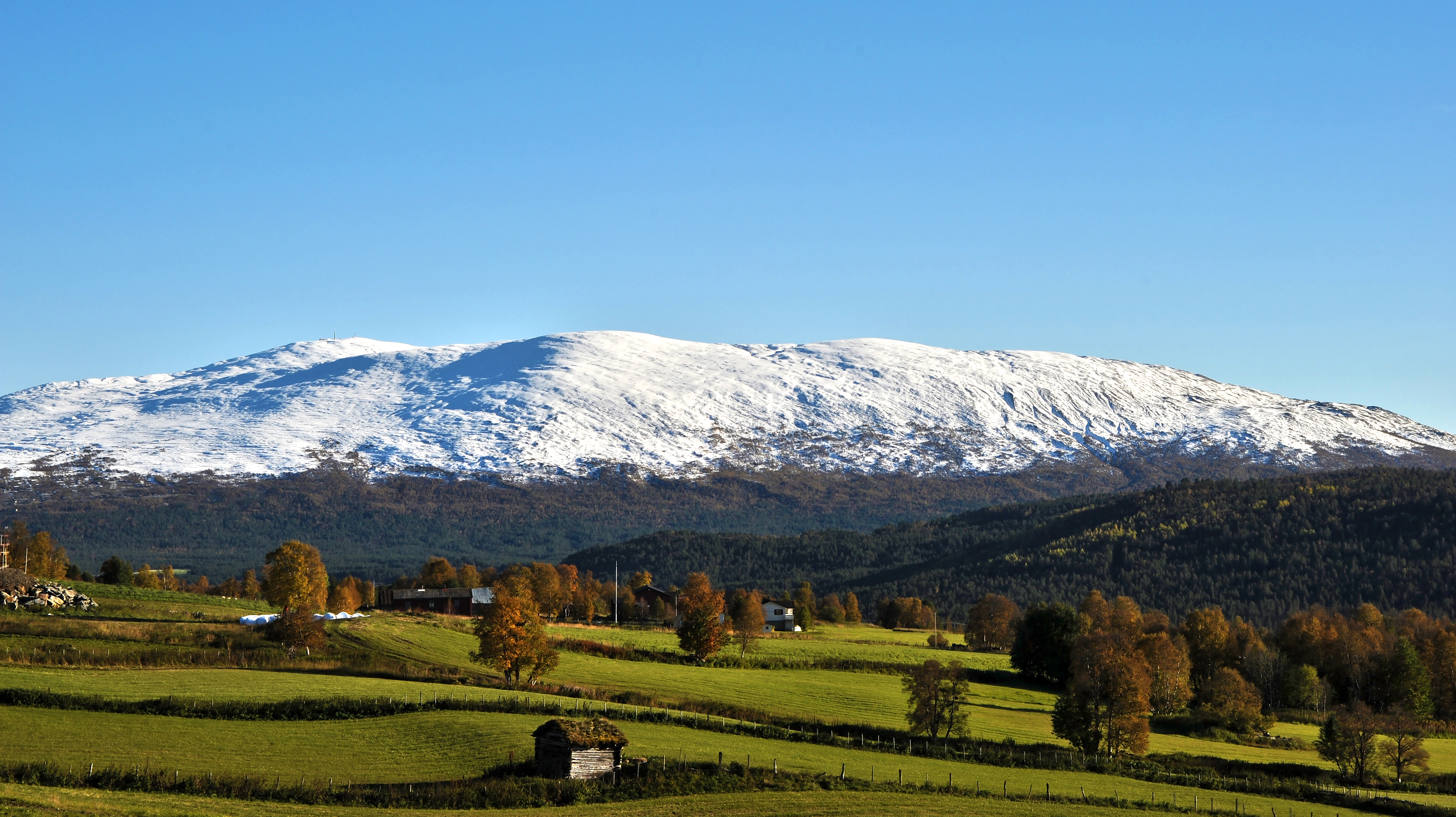
- Hummelfjell as seen from northwest

Highest point
- Elevation: 1,543 m (5,062 ft)
- Prominence: 628 m (2,060 ft)
- Parent peak: Nordre Sålekinna
- Isolation: 24.2 km (15.0 mi)
- Listing: No. 495 in Norway
- Coordinates: 62°25′48″N 11°16′29″E

Geography
- Interactive map of the mountain
- Location: Innlandet, Norway

Håmmålsfjellet (historically spelled Hummelfjell) is a mountain in Innlandet county, Norway. It is located on the border of Tolga Municipality and Os Municipality. Its tallest peak is Gråhøgda, which has an elevation of 1,543 meters (5,062 ft) above mean sea level and a topographical prominence of 628 meters (2,060 ft). It is the 495th-tallest peak in Norway. There is a road to the peak from the village of Os, about 7 kilometres (4.3 mi) to the north.

This mountain was the site of the crash of Braathens SAFE Flight 253 on 7 November 1956, resulting in the killing of 41 of the 45 occupants of the aircraft.

== See also ==
- List of mountains of Norway
