= Olav Hummelvold =

Norwegian politician

Olav Hummelvoll (5 November 1903 – 12 August 1999) was a Norwegian politician for the Centre Party.

He served as a deputy representative to the Parliament of Norway from Hedmark during the term 1958–1961. In total he met during 19 days of parliamentary session.
