= Tufsingdalen =

Village in Os Municipality, Norway

Tufsingdalen Tufsingdal
- Village
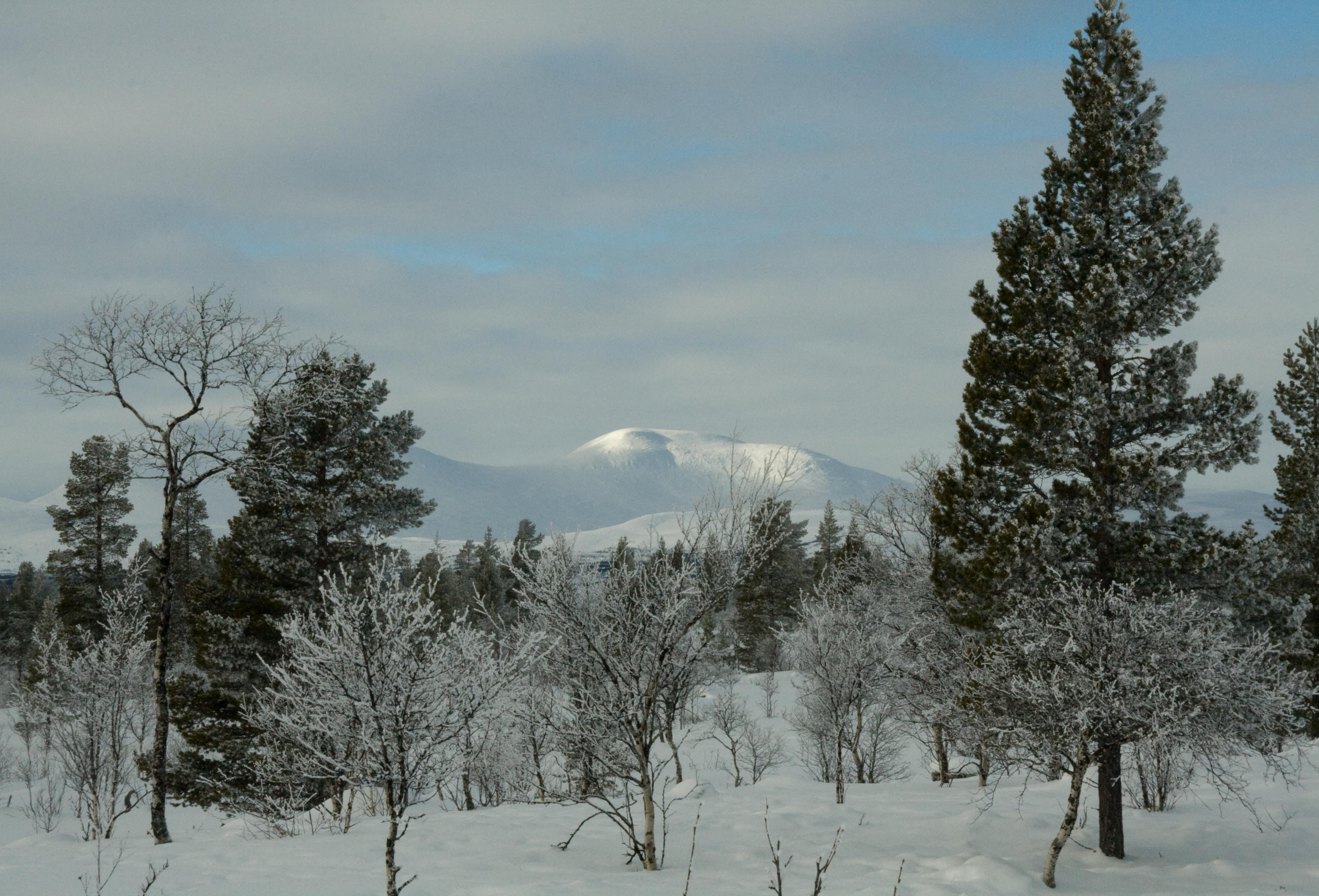
- View of the surrounding landscape
- Interactive map of Tufsingdalen
- Location within Innlandet Location within Norway
- Coordinates: 62.30322°N 11.71986°E
- Country: Norway
- Region: Eastern Norway
- County: Innlandet
- District: Østerdalen
- Municipality: Os Municipality
- Elevation: 670 m (2,200 ft)
- Time zone: UTC+01:00 (CET)
  - Summer (DST): UTC+02:00 (CEST)
- Post Code: 2555 Tufsingdalen

Tufsingdalen or Tufsingdal is a village area and valley in Os Municipality in Innlandet county, Norway. The village area is located along the river Tufsinga which flows through the Tufsingdalen valley. It lies in the southeastern part of the municipality, about 40 kilometres (25 mi) southeast of the village of Os i Østerdalen and about 10 kilometres (6.2 mi) north of the large lake Femunden.

There are about 170 residents in the valley. Tufsingdalen Church is located in the valley.

== History ==
Before 1713, there were no permanent residents in Tufsingdalen. However, it was known for the rich population of whitefish in the river, and there were certainly fishing and haying along the river before this time.

In 1712, ore explorers from Røros Kobberverk found silver in the rock on the west side of Tufsingdalen, and a trial operation was started the following year. The mine was operated until 1716, because the deposit turned out to be smaller than expected. Of the 28 people who worked at the mine, two of them chose to remain in the valley as farmers.

In 1739, Femundshytta was built in Tufsingdalen as a smelting hut for the copper that was mined in and around Røros. There were at most 11 farms and families attached to it. The smelting hut was closed down in 1822. In July 2010, the area was included on the UNESCO World Heritage List as part of the entry Røros Mining Town and the Circumference.
