= Os Church (Innlandet) =

Church in Innlandet, Norway

- Os kirke
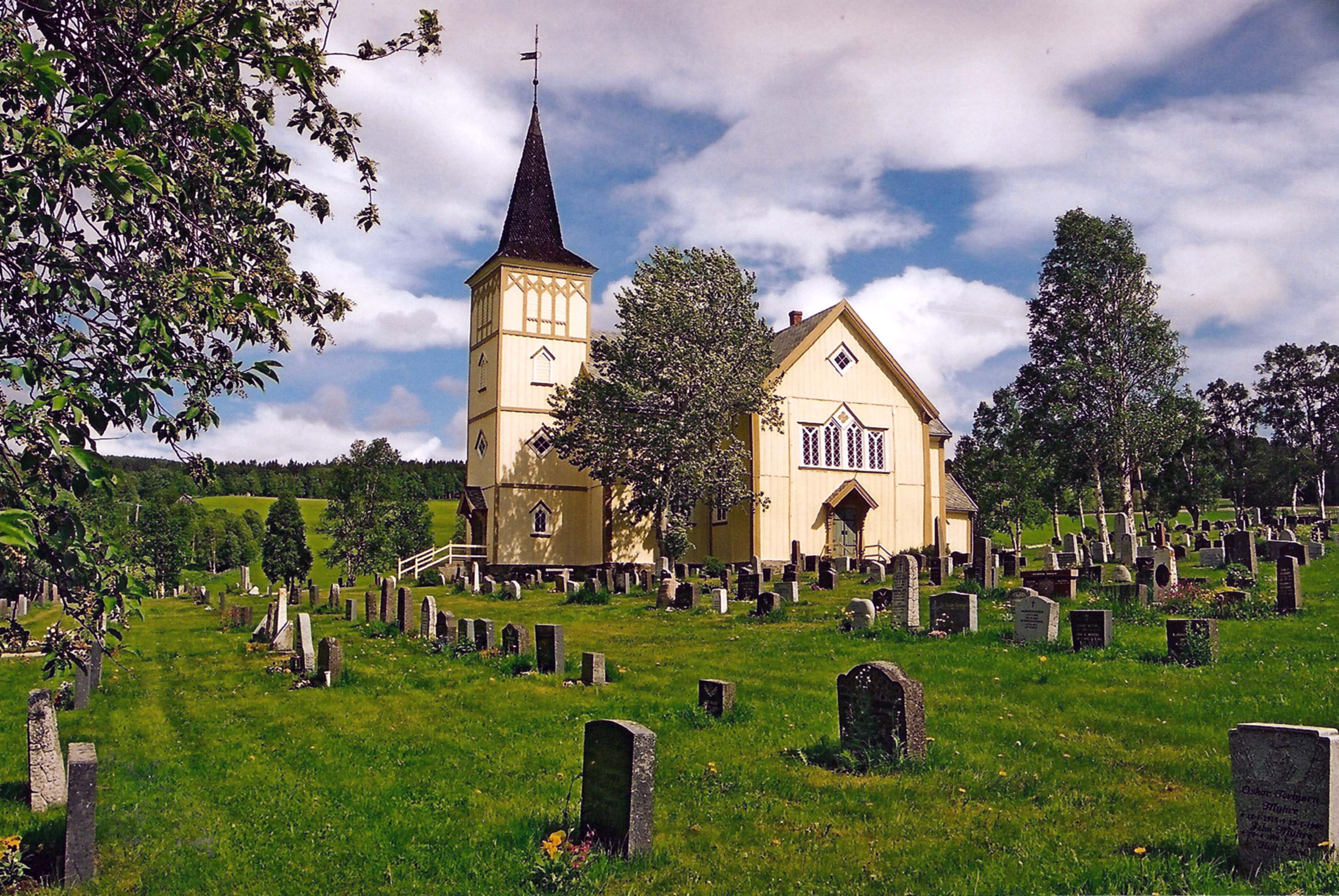
- View of the church
- Os Church
- 62°30′06″N 11°11′32″E
- Location: Os Municipality, Innlandet
- Country: Norway
- Denomination: Church of Norway
- Churchmanship: Evangelical Lutheran

History
- Status: Parish church
- Founded: 16th century
- Consecrated: 30 September 1862

Architecture
- Functional status: Active
- Architect: P.H. Holtermann
- Architectural type: Cruciform
- Completed: 1862 (164 years ago)

Specifications
- Capacity: 350
- Materials: Wood

Administration
- Diocese: Hamar bispedømme
- Deanery: Nord-Østerdal prosti
- Parish: Os
- Norwegian Cultural Heritage Site
- Type: Church
- Status: Listed
- ID: 85244

Os Church (Norwegian: Os kirke) is a parish church of the Church of Norway in Os Municipality in Innlandet county, Norway. It is located in the village of Os i Østerdalen. It is the church for the Os parish which is part of the Nord-Østerdal prosti (deanery) in the Diocese of Hamar. The yellow, wooden church was built in a cruciform design in 1862 using plans drawn up by the architect Peter Høier Holtermann. The church seats about 350 people.

== History ==
The earliest existing historical records of the church date back to the 1570s, but the church was not new that year. The first church in Os was a small, wooden church that may have been built during the 16th century. Historically, the Os area was part of the In 1638, the church received a new altarpiece. In 1703, the old church was torn down and a new, wooden cruciform church was built on the same site. The new church was consecrated on 2 February 1704 by Rev. Hannibal Knutsen Hammer. Apparently, the sacristy of the new church was made from part of the old church. By the 1860s, the old church was too small for the parish, so plans were made to replace it. The last service in the old church was held on Sunday, 16 March 1862, and the next day the furniture and loose parts such as windows, doors, and the like, were sold at auction. The church was then torn down and work on a new church began soon after. The new building was designed by Peter Høier Holtermann and the lead builder was Jon Eriksen Berg. It was a wooden cruciform building and it was consecrated on 30 September 1862. In 1940, the church had a large fire and after World War II, plans were made to repair the church. A major reconstruction project took place during 1952-1954. The church got a new roof in 1980-1982. From 2010-2012, the church underwent a major renovation again.

== Media gallery ==
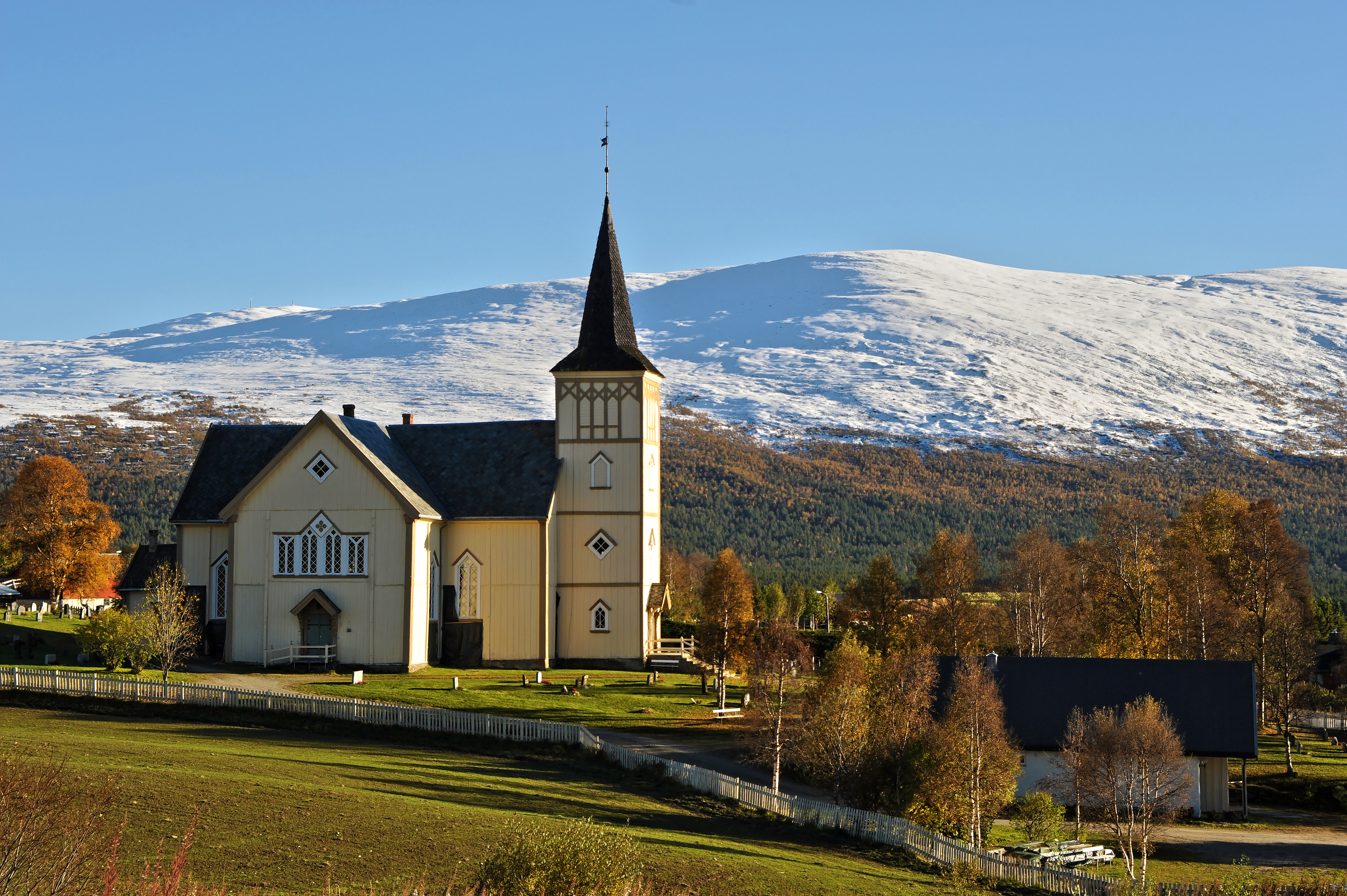

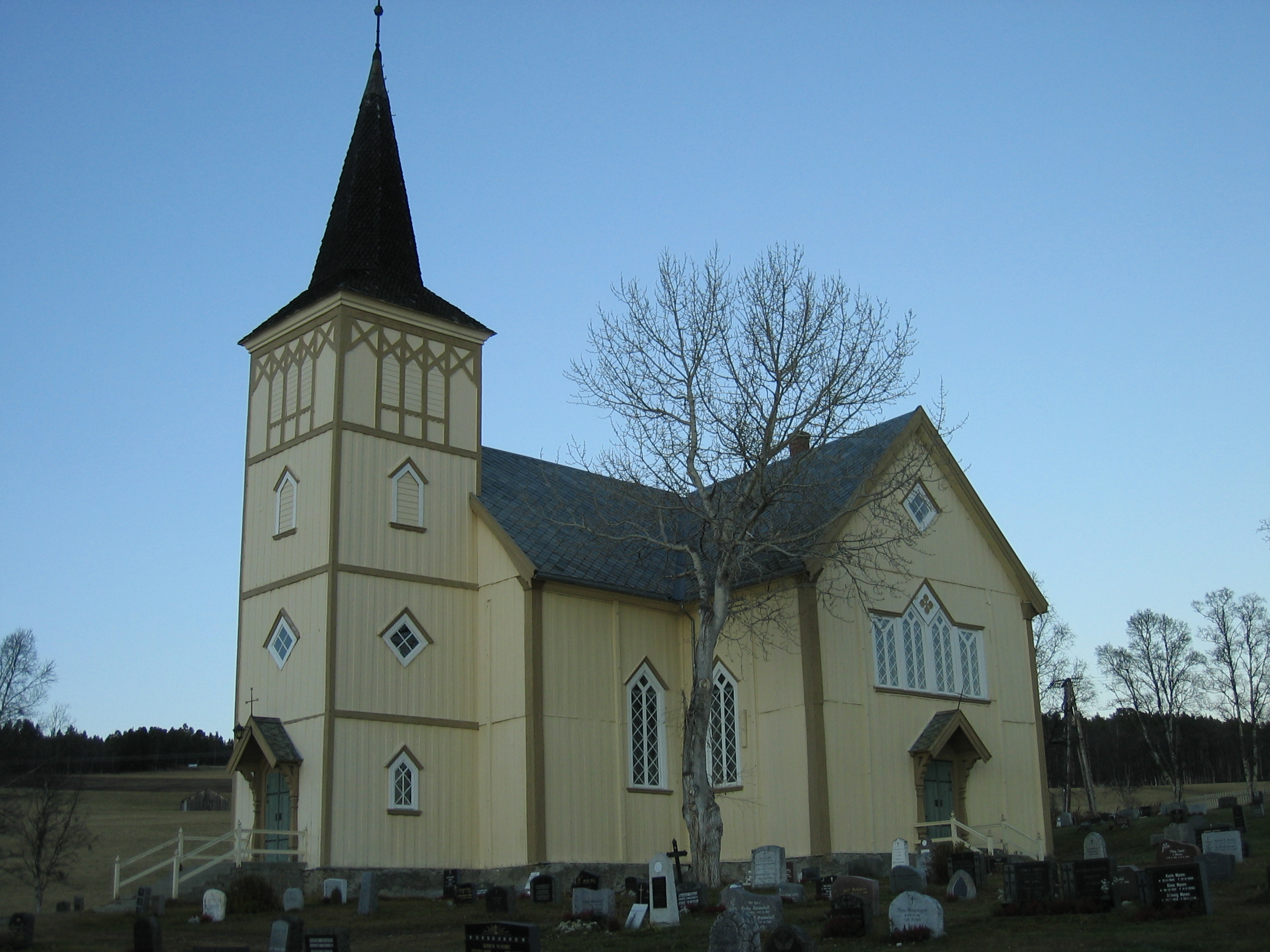

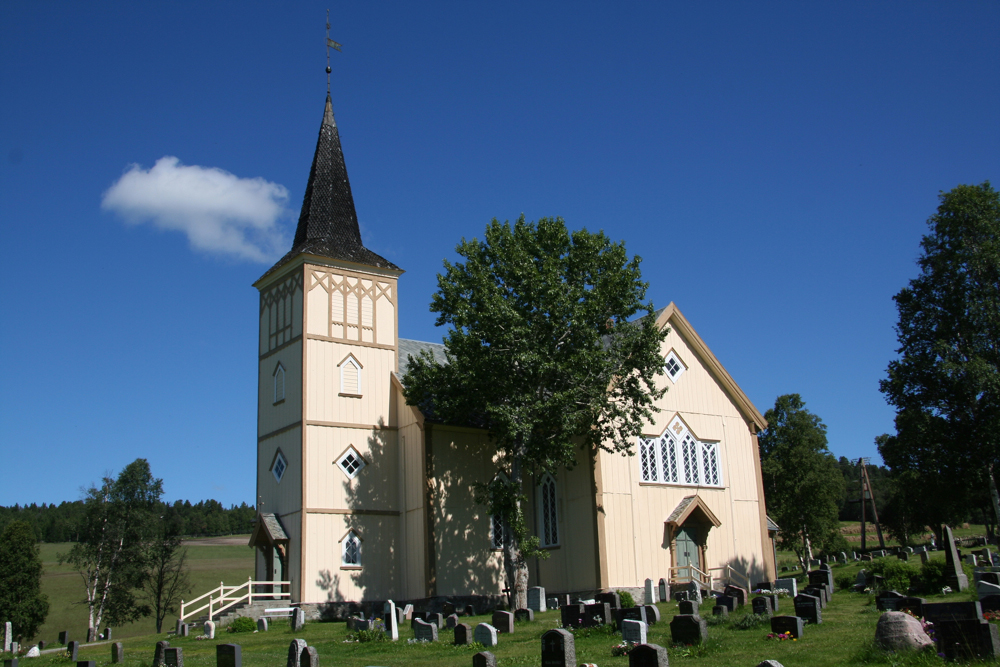

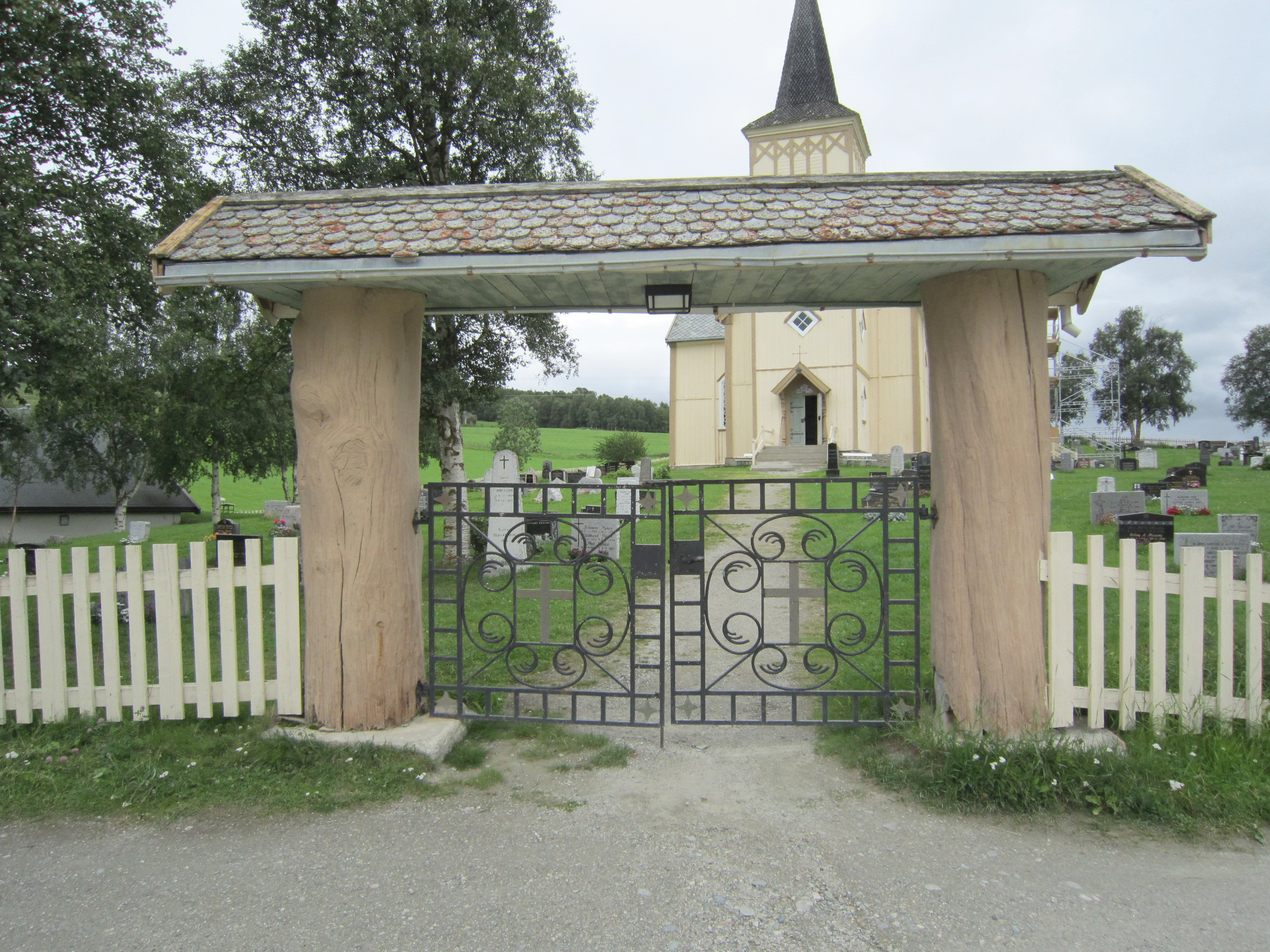

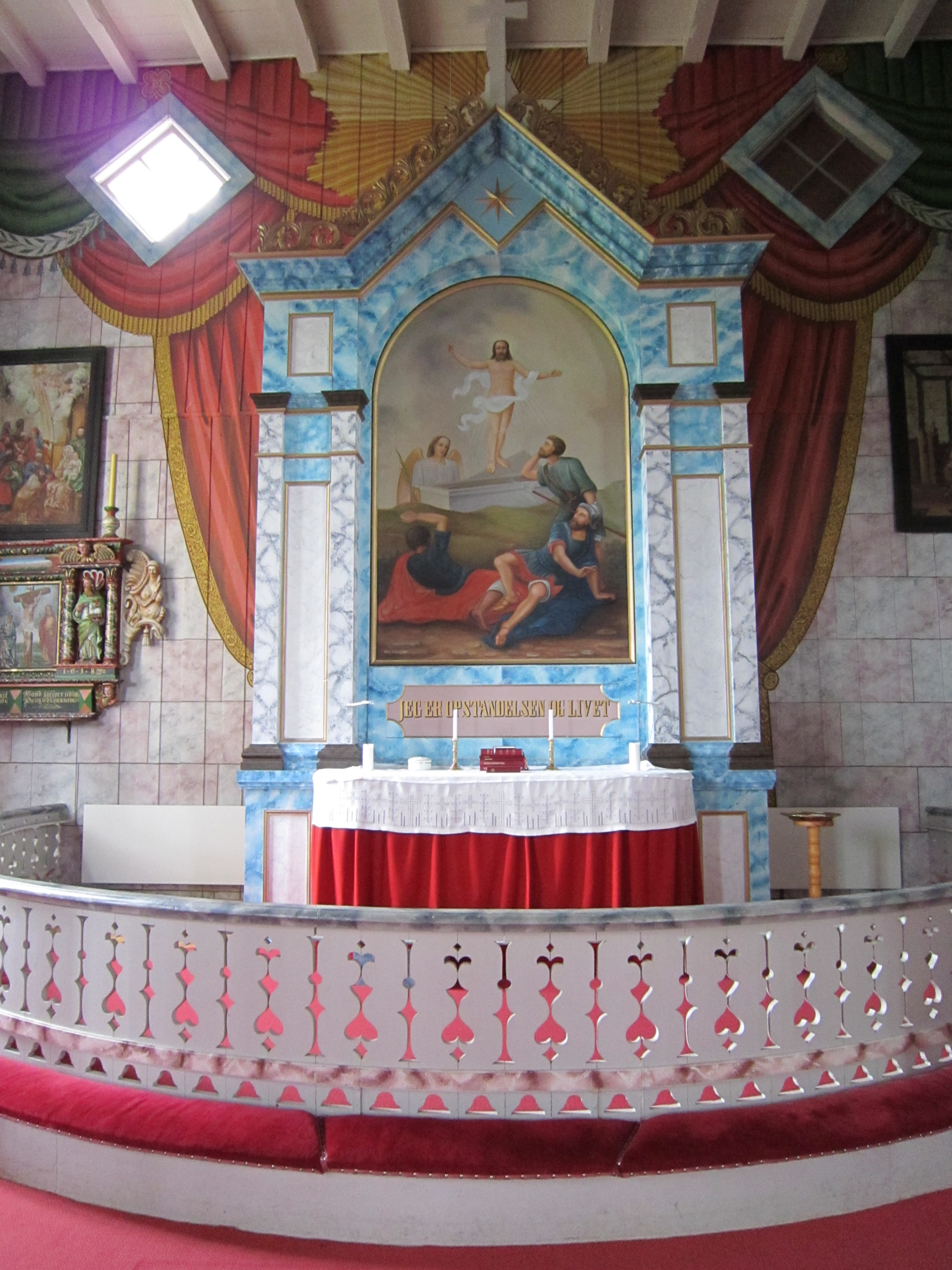

== See also ==
- List of churches in Hamar
