= Os i Østerdalen =

Village in Os Municipality, Norway

Os Os i Østerdalen
- Village
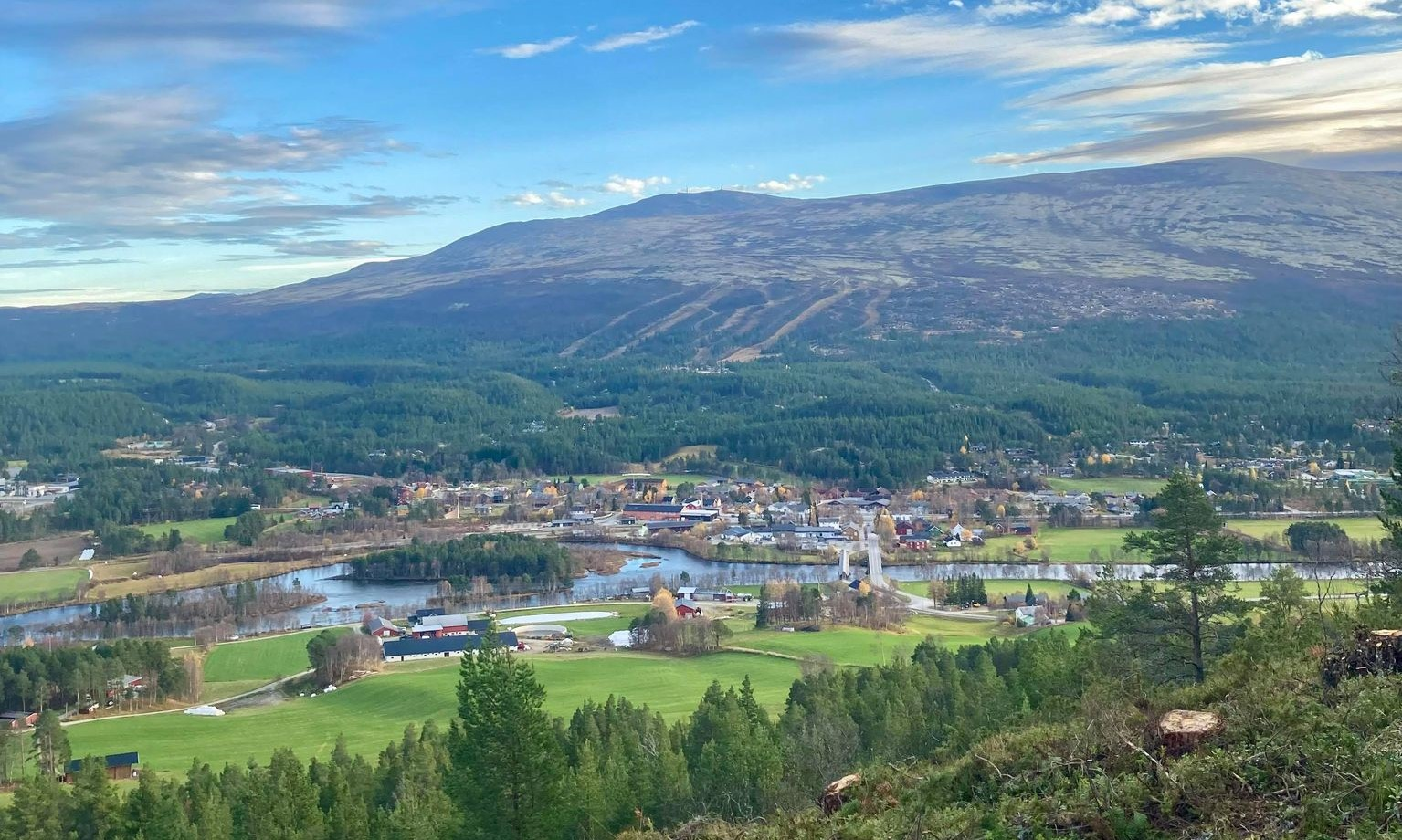
- View of the village area
- Interactive map of Os
- Location within Innlandet Location within Norway
- Coordinates: 62.49649°N 11.22331°E
- Country: Norway
- Region: Eastern Norway
- County: Innlandet
- District: Østerdalen
- Municipality: Os Municipality

Area
  - Total: 1.03 km^{2} (0.40 sq mi)
- Elevation: 600 m (2,000 ft)

Population (2024)
  - Total: 687
  - Density: 667/km^{2} (1,730/sq mi)
- Time zone: UTC+01:00 (CET)
  - Summer (DST): UTC+02:00 (CEST)
- Post Code: 2550 Os

Os or Os i Østerdalen is the administrative centre of Os Municipality in Innlandet county, Norway. The village is located along the upper part of the river Glåma, about 15 kilometres (9.3 mi) northeast of the village of Tolga and about 12 kilometres (7.5 mi) southwest of the town of Røros. The Os Church is located in the village.

The 1.03-square-kilometre (250-acre) village has a population (2024) of 687 and a population density of 667 inhabitants per square kilometre (1,730/sq mi). This village is the only urban area in the municipality according to Statistics Norway.

The village lies in the Glåma river valley and the mountain Håmmålsfjellet lies about 4 kilometres (2.5 mi) south of the village. The village of Dalsbygda lies about 8 kilometres (5.0 mi) to the northwest of this village and the village of Narbuvoll lies about 20 kilometres (12 mi) to the southeast of this village.

The village lies along the County Road 30 and the Rørosbanen railway line, with a stop at Os Station.
