= History of Braathens (1994–2004) =

History of Braathens from domestic market deregulation to dissolution

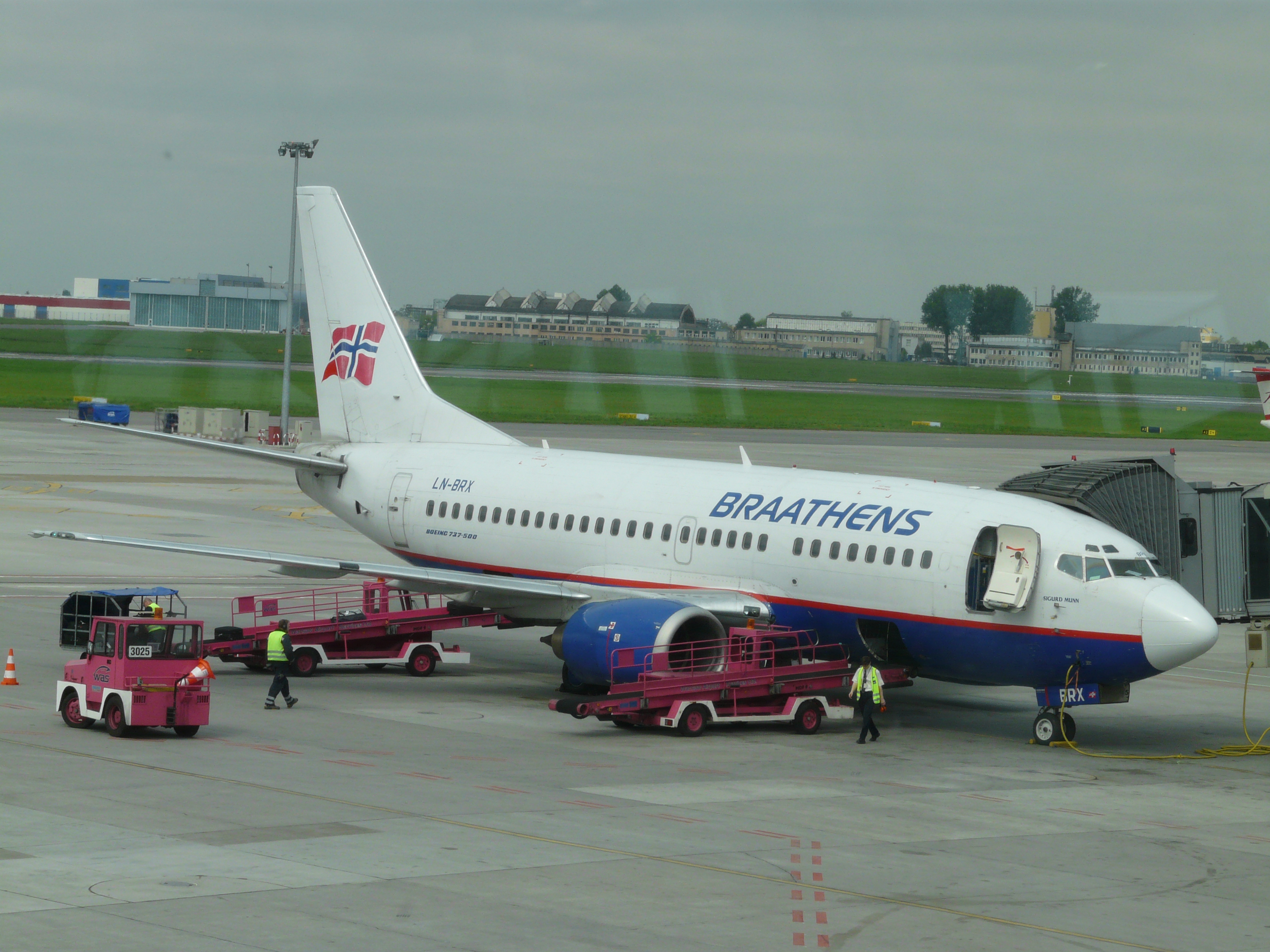
A Boeing 737-500 in the final Braathens livery before the company merged with Scandinavian Airlines System to become SAS Braathens

Braathens SAFE's domestic market was deregulated on 1 April 1994. Since then, any airline within the European Economic Area is free to operate any domestic or international route. Braathens rejected a proposal from the main competitor Scandinavian Airlines System (SAS) for a merger; instead the helicopter division was sold and the company listed on the Oslo Stock Exchange. New routes were opened from Oslo Airport, Fornebu to Bodø, Harstad/Narvik and Tromsø, but the routes from Bergen to these cities were terminated. International routes to Rome, Nice and Jersey were introduced. In 1996, Braathens SAFE bought Sweden's second-largest airline, Transwede, and started flying on the Oslo–Stockholm route. The following year, Transwede, with its five domestic routes, was merged into Braathens SAFE. The same year, KLM bought 30% of Braathens SAFE and the airlines started a partnership.

In 1998, the airline changed its name to Braathens and introduced two-class cabins. Full-fare passengers traveled in the "Best"-class, while discounted travelers traveled in the "Back"-class. It also bought the Swedish airline Malmö Aviation. Oslo Airport, Gardermoen replaced Fornebu as the airline's main hub, and a price war started against SAS and the new low-cost airline Color Air. The availability of slots increased the frequency of flights for all three airlines to an unsustainable level. After a year, Color Air was bankrupt, but Braathens had suffered large losses, and terminated many routes, including all services in Sweden. In 2001, the airline was bought by SAS, and the following year the two coordinated their services so as not to compete. On 1 May 2004, they merged to create SAS Braathens, that re-branded to Scandinavian Airlines in 2007.

== Deregulation ==
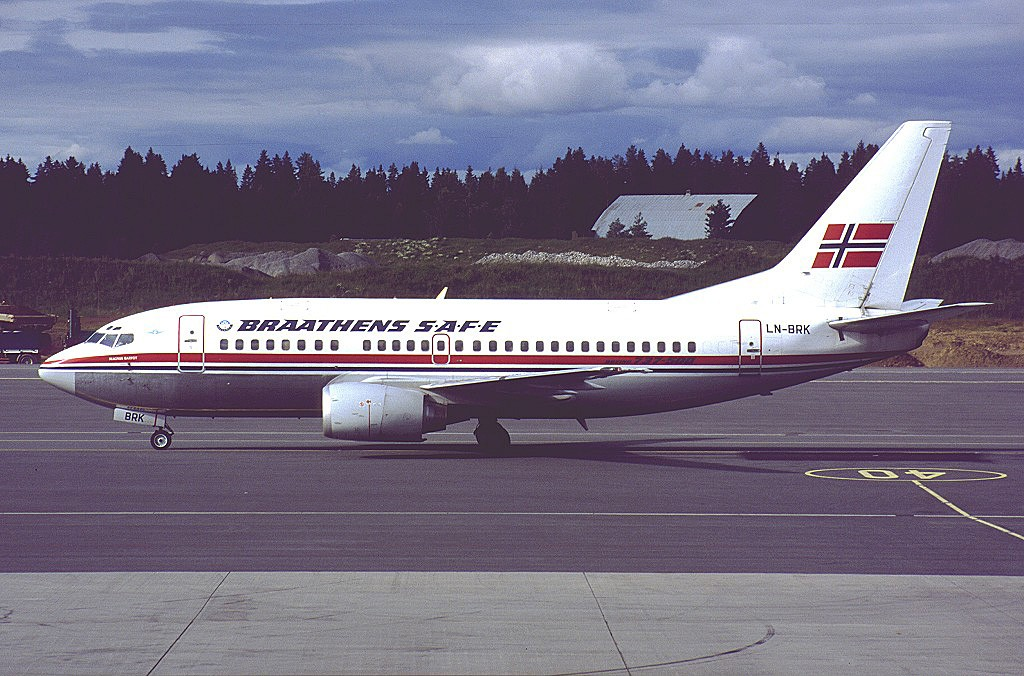
A Braathens SAFE Boeing 737-500

The deregulation process, which would eliminate the need for concessions for routes, was driven by Norway's application for membership of the EU. This was supported by the Labor Party and the right-winged Conservative Party and Progress Party. The plans from the EU indicated that international routes within EU should be deregulated from 1 January 1993, with Norway and Sweden joining from 1 July. Full, domestic liberalization should be performed by 1 April 1997. SAS and Braathens SAFE proposed a solution where only Norwegian airlines could compete until 1997, which was thought to efficiently hinder other airlines, rather than these two, until then. SAS announced its support for competition on 4 February 1993, while Braathens SAFE stated that it no longer was in favor of competition, despite having arguing for this for the whole of the company's history. The company stated that stability was needed and that competition would result in marginalized routes, that were being cross-subsidized, being closed. SAS stated that with competition, prices would fall 20–30%, and that SAS wanted to operate with a loss to force Braathens SAFE close services.

During the discussion about deregulation, Braathens SAFE considered several possibilities to strengthen itself. In particular, it had discussions with the large European airlines Lufthansa, British Airways and KLM about an alliance, but these were rejected by Braathens SAFE, stating that the agreements were all about getting traffic to the partner's hub. Minister of Transport, Kjell Opseth and director of SAS in Norway, Jan Reinås, both proposed a merger between Braathens SAFE and SAS, to ensure that the company had a 100% market share on the primary routes before the merger. This would, according to them, secure that no foreign company could compete with the merged company. The proposal was rejected by Braathens SAFE's management. Still, negotiations started between the companies in 1992, although they were quickly abandoned. The press reported the price of Braathens SAFE to be NOK 1.2 billion, but that this had been rejected as too expensive by SAS.

Prior to a government report being presented on 30 March 1993, SAS had launched 1 November 1993 as their preferred date of free competition, while Braathens SAFE had launched 1 April 1997 as their preferred date. Braaathens SAFE was worried that the high debt the company had due to the purchase of new aircraft would make them illiquid in a price war. Bjørn G. Braathen stated that the company had bought the new aircraft based on the belief that deregulation would occur in 1997, giving the airline time to pay more of the debt. On 2 June 1993, with 76 against 18 votes, parliament voted to deregulate the domestic airline market from 1 April 1994. It was supported by the Labor, Conservative and Progress Party. With this, Norway became the third country in Europe to fully deregulate, after Sweden and the United Kingdom.

Both Braathens SAFE and SAS had been cross-subsidizing their routes. Through the regulations, the airlines had agreed to fly to unprofitable airports, in exchange for making higher profits on other routes. With free competition, this would not be followed, and the authorities announced the introduction of public service obligations on routes that were not profitable. To finance these, a NOK 10 fee would be charged on all primary routes. The cost of collecting this fee was so high that SAS and Braathens SAFE announced it was cheaper to continue to fly to the unprofitable airports. Braathens SAFE stated that their routes Haugesund–Bergen and Oslo–Røros–Trondheim were not profitable.

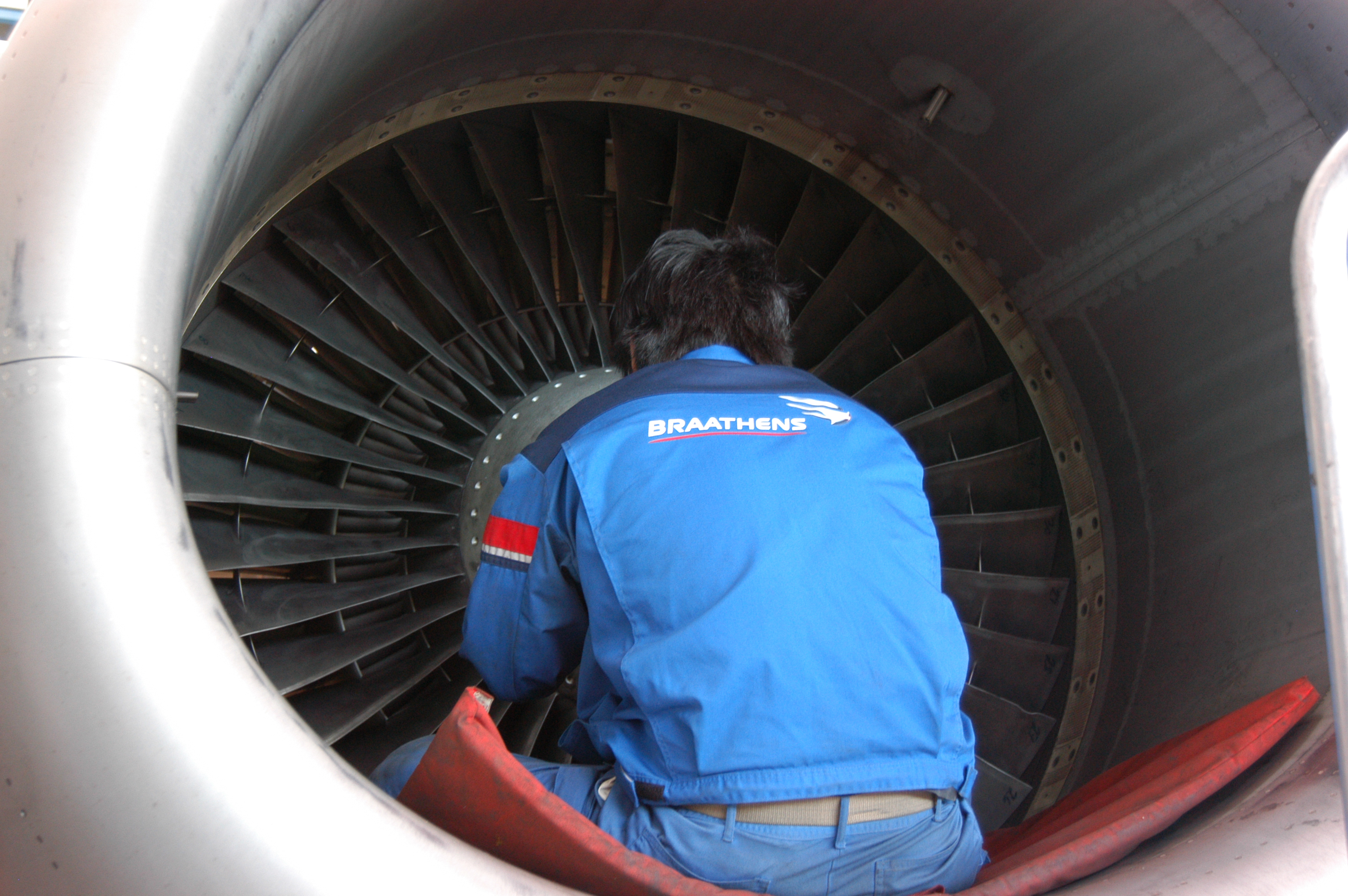
A Braathens employee working on a CFM International CFM56 turbofan engine

To meet the free market situation, the company's management introduced measures to keep costs low. On 19 August 1993, ten of eleven trade unions agreed to a three-year wage contract, which contained bonuses for all employees based on the company's profit. The cabin crew's union had a two-day strike, before reaching an agreement. At the same time, the company needed NOK 400 million in share capital. Braathens Rederi sold the sister company Braathens Helikopter to Helkopter Service for NOK 225 million on 30 September 1993, and the money was used to buy Braathens SAFE stock. The company raised further capital in an initial public offering, and the company was listed on the Oslo Stock Exchange on 10 January 1994. After the listing, Braathens Rederi retained 69% of the company.

On 1 April, Braathens SAFE increased the number of services. The daily number of flights from Oslo to Bergen increased to nine, and the airline introduced four new services to Northern Norway from Oslo: two each to Tromsø and Harstad/Narvik. Later, the frequency to Tromsø increased to four, and from 28 June there were also two daily round trips to Bodø. SAS increased its services on the routes from Oslo to Stavanger and Trondheim, and from Bergen to Stavanger. The liberalization did not result in a price war, and prices remained constant. The following two years, Braathens SAFE also introduced scheduled international flights to Rome, as well as summer routes to Jersey and Nice. However, Braathens SAFE terminated their routes from Bergen to Bodø, Harstad/Narvik and Tromsø, making the passengers switch planes in Trondheim.

In 1995, Braathens signed agreements with many of the large companies in Norway as a prioritized airline. Several of the contracts had been secured by the airline offering discounts to the companies in exchange for not allowing their customers to collect frequent flyer points. SAS had not allowed this scheme, and had lost companies such as Statoil, Aker and the Government of Norway.

== Expansion into Sweden ==
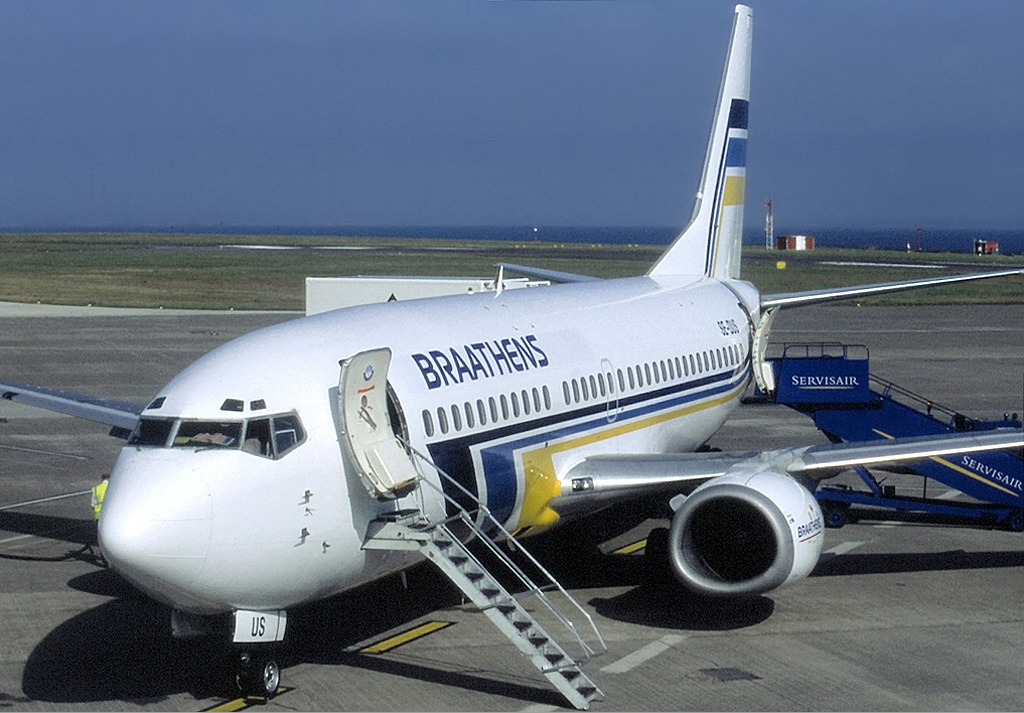
Braathens Boeing 737-300 in hybrid Transwede livery—this was the only -300 operated by Braathens

In 1996, Braathens SAFE started negotiations to purchase the Swedish airline Transwede Airways from its owners, Transpool. After SAS had bought Linjeflyg, Transwede had become the second-largest domestic airline in Sweden, operating five Fokker 100s. In 1995, Braathens SAFE had a revenue of NOK 4 billion, with a profit of NOK 242 million. The same year, Transwede had lost NOK 200 million with a revenue of NOK 1.2 billion. The company had been split in two, a charter and a scheduled company, and Braathens SAFE started negotiating to purchase the scheduled company. Transwede's scheduled services were at the time form Stockholm Arlanda Airport to Halmstad, Jönköping, Luleå, Sundsvall and Umeå, plus a service from Luleå to Sundsvall. It had a 13% market share, transporting 800,000 people in 1995, and had been through a major restructuring the year before, where the fleet had been reduced from seven to five aircraft.

On 18 June, Braathens SAFE announced that starting on 27 October, the company put one aircraft into service on the route from Oslo to Stockholm. SAS had at the time fifteen round trips on the route, and Braathens planned to introduce seven. The route was considered one of the most profitable for SAS. The purchase of Transwede was confirmed on 25 June; Braathens SAFE bought 50% of the company's scheduled division, Transwede Airways, with an option to purchase the rest in 1997. The companies planned to integrate their networks, to allow connection between Braathens SAFE's and Transwede flights at Stockholm. Services to Stockholm started on 6 November; after three months, the airline had captured 14% of the Oslo–Stockholm market. In 1996, Braathens SAFE had a 51% domestic market share in Norway, transporting 9.5 million passengers.

On 3 February 1997, the airline announced it had ordered six 134-seat Boeing 737-700 aircraft for NOK 1.5 billion. These aircraft would be delivered in 1998, prior to the opening of the new airport at Gardermoen. In addition, the airline had an option for additional ten planes to be delivered after 2000. In 1997, Transwede started replacing its Fokker 100s with Boeing 737s. In May 1997, Braathens SAFE was criticized by the Norwegian Airline Pilots Association because it was using retired Braathens SAFE pilots to fly Transwede aircraft, due to Transwede not having certified pilots for their new Boeing 737-300. Braathens SAFE stated that this was within the rules of the Swedish Civil Aviation Administration and the Joint Aviation Authorities.

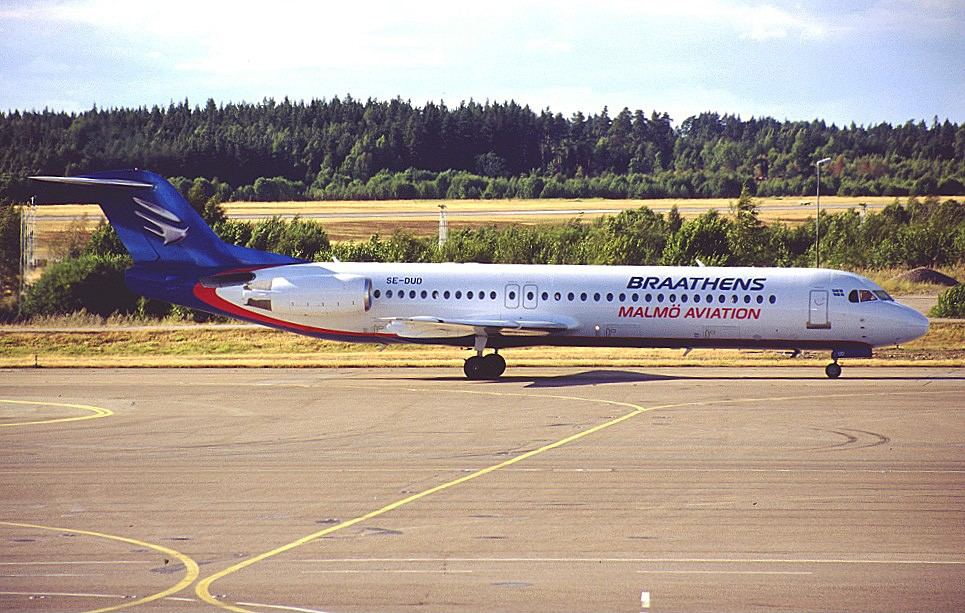
Fokker 100 in combined Braathens and Malmö Aviation livery

In 1997, SAS announced that it was going to reduce its commission to travel agents from 9 to 5%. Braathens followed, reducing from 8 to 5% from 1 January 1998. However, to try to attract more business passengers, the airline retained the 8% commission on their international routes. At the same time, the Government of Norway abandoned its old regime of negotiating prices with the airlines for state-employed civil servants' flights. Instead, they introduced an annual tender for the routes. It was awarded to SAS, who also won all subsequent tenders. For Braathens SAFE, this meant that state-employed civil servants only flew on routes where SAS did not fly. The contract was worth NOK 500 million for SAS.

On 1 April 1997, the European airline market was fully deregulated. At this time, British Airways announced increased activity to Scandinavia, based in part on a cooperation with Braathens SAFE concerning their frequently flyer program; holders of Bracard were allowed to collect frequent flyer points on British Airways' flights. On 3 April, Braathens SAFE, Transwede and Finnair signed an agreement involving codesharing on Finnair's flights from Stockholm and Oslo to Helsinki, Bracard members would be granted points on Finnair flights, and Braathens SAFE took over Finnair's handling services in Oslo.

On 18 December, Braathens SAFE bought the remaining half of Transwede, paying 2 Swedish krona for the who company. However, due to an agreement about converting debt into share capital, the company was sold for SEK 13 million. With the take-over, the company changed its name to Braathens Sverige AB. At the same time, management announced that they planned to replace all the company's Fokker 100s with 737-300s.

== Partnership and new identity ==
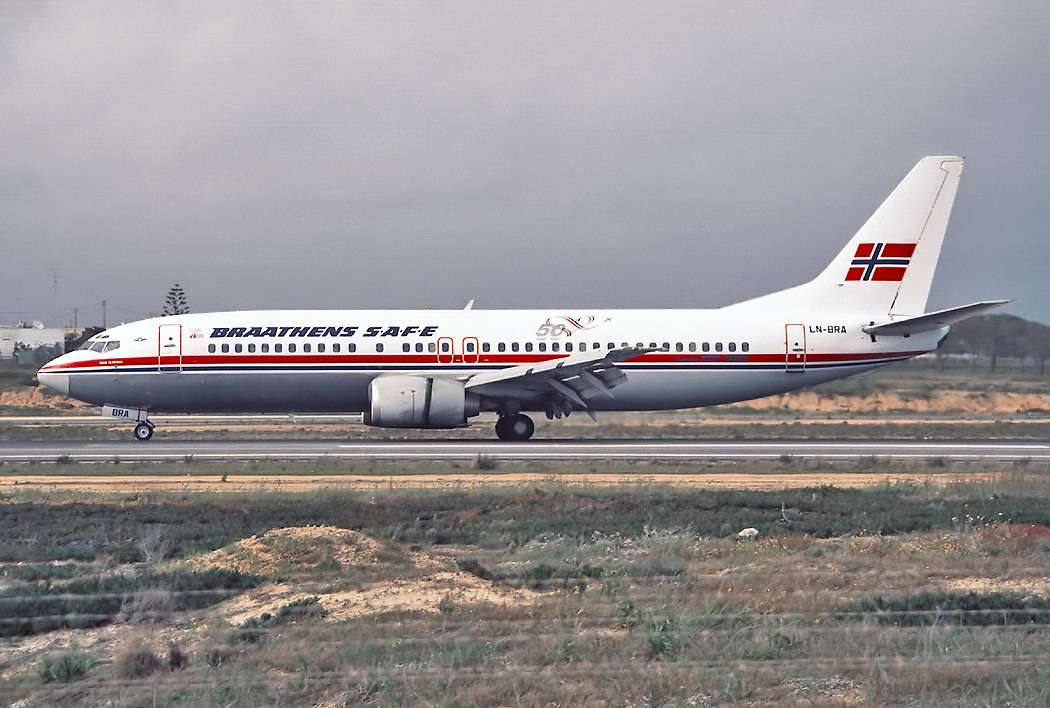
A Braathens SAFE Boeing 737-400 with special 50-year anniversary markings

On 18 August 1997, Braathens SAFE announced a strategic partnership with the Dutch airline KLM. The partnership replaced the agreement with British Airways, and became active in 1998. Analysts stated that the partnership came as a reaction to SAS' alliance with Lufthansa, the Star Alliance, that had been created the previous year. Braathens SAFE had also been in negotiations with British Airways. The agreement involved KLM purchasing a 30% stake in Braathens SAFE from Ludvig G. Braathens Rederi for NOK 800 million. In addition, Braathens SAFE started flying from several Norwegian cities to KLM's main hub at Schiphol Airport in Amsterdam. In addition, the partnership involved a coordination of scheduling, prices, frequent flyer programs, corporate customer agreements, maintenance and procurement. The partnership also involved cooperation with the American airline Northwest Airlines. In 1997, Braathens SAFE and Transwede had a revenue of NOK 5.4 billion and made a profit of NOK 206 million, down 88 million from 1996.

Starting in March, Braathens SAFE took over KLM's routes from Stavanger to Amsterdam, and started a new route from Trondheim to Amsterdam. From 26 March 1998, Braathens SAFE moved its flights to London from Gatwick to London Stansted Airport. At the same time, it announced that the number of daily services from Oslo to London would increase from one to three, following the opening of Gardermoen. In addition, KLM-partner AirUK would become an agent for Braathens SAFE, and the company hoped that 40% of the sales on the route would be sold in the United Kingdom. The agreement also involved a codesharing agreement with AirUK, including some onwards flights from London, notably the route to Dublin. At the same time, Braathens SAFE announced that the airline would start selling more discounted tickets on the London-flights, to compete with Ryanair's new route from Stanstad to Sandefjord Airport, Torp.

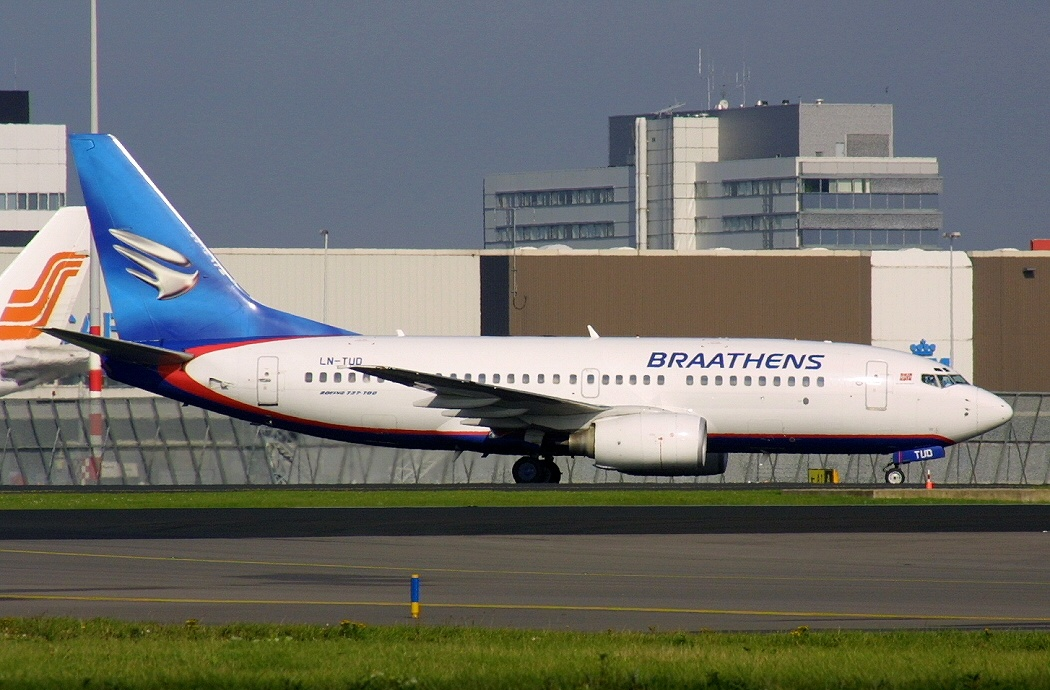
In 1997, Braathens changed its name and introduced a new livery, here seen on a Boeing 737-700

On 23 March 1998, Braathens SAFE changed its name and corporate identity to Braathens. It introduced a new livery with a blue bottom, and replaced the Norwegian flag on the tail with an abstract, silver wing, that became the company's new logo. The re-branding was an attempt to create an international identity, and tone down the Norwegian national symbols that had been on the airplanes since 1946. At the same time, a two-class configuration was introduced: the 'Best' section, accounting for 70% of the planes capacity, received higher seat pitch, complimentary in-flight drinks, meals and newspapers, priority boarding and refundable tickets. The 'Back' section was for discount ticket holders, who received a no-frills service with a smaller seat pitch, and were located at the back of the aircraft behind a curtain. Best tickets became NOK 300 more expensive, while it became easier to purchase discounted tickets. The scheme was, according to Erik G. Braathen, an attempt to differentiate between the full-fare customers, with whom Braathens was competing with SAS, and the low-fare customers, who Braathens was competing with Ryanair and the to-be established Color Air. The scheme as first introduced on the first 737-700 that was delivered.

The Norwegian Confederation of Trade Unions encouraged its 800,000 members to not fly with Braathens due to the introduction of a segregated classes. SAS did not follow the same policy, and offered its discounted customers to travel in the same class as Braathens', including complimentary service. After introduction, the concept increased the work load on handing employees, who needed to check the passengers' tickets to ensure they sat in the right class. There were also complaints from Best-passengers who felt that they were receiving worse service after the scheme was introduced.

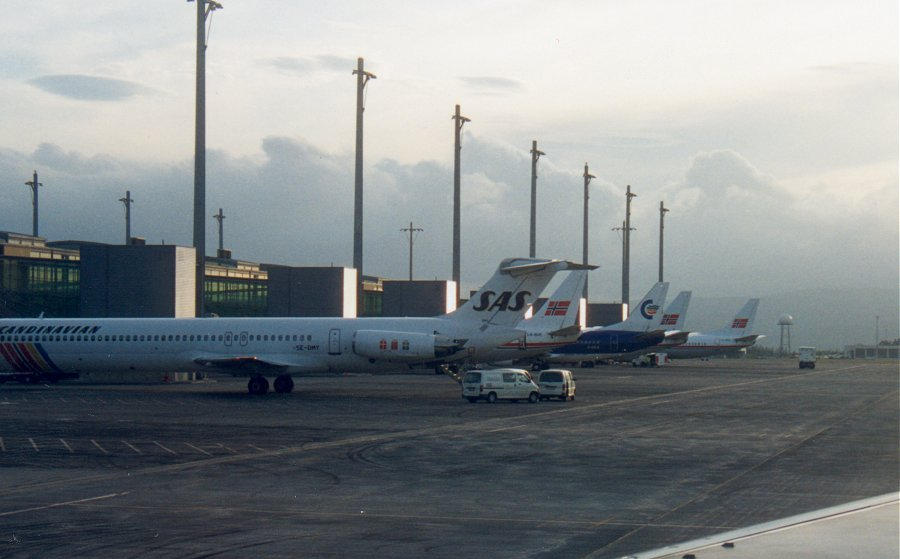
The domestic concourse at Oslo Airport, Gardermoen, with planes from Braathens, Scandinavian Airlines and Color Air

On 17 August 1998, Braathens bought Malmö Aviation, that flew from Stockholm-Bromma Airport to Göteborg Landvetter Airport and Malmö Airport. In addition, it served all three airports from London City Airport. The airline had eleven British Aerospace 146 jets. In 1997, it had 772,000 passengers, 450 employees, a revenue of SEK 900 million and a profit of SEK 40 million. The airline cost SEK 600 million and the deal gave Braathens and Malmö Aviation a 25% domestic market share in Sweden.

== Price war ==
In January 1998, Olav Nils Sunde, owner of the cruiseferry company Color Line, announced that he would start a domestic low-cost airline. They company aimed for a 15–20% domestic market share and was named Color Air. The company launched tickets down to NOK 500 each way, and sold cheap tickets without demanding that the traveler be away during a weekend.

From 1 April, a new NOK 65 tax was introduced on all domestic flights. Braathens and SAS decided to divide the cross-subsidize the taxes between their routes, something Color Air was not able to do. This was because the tax was only valid for routes within Southern Norway; Braathens and SAS could therefore tacitly collude to increase the prices to Northern Norway, and thereby subsidize their routes in Southern Norway. Color Air on the other hand would be forced to put the full tax on all its departures. While the government had no way to hinder the incumbents from doing this, Gudmund Restad, Minister of Finance from the Center Party, encouraged the airlines to not "cheat", and follow the intentions of the law, even if he admitted that there was nothing the government could do to hinder the airlines from cross-subsidizing.

Color Air started with flights from Gardermoen on 1 August, two months before the airport opened. Gardermoen was taken into use on 8 October by SAS and Braathens. Both immediately increased the number of flights. Braathens established a route to Haugesund, while SAS started routes to Ålesund and Kristiansand. The number of daily trips from Oslo for SAS increased from 59 to over 80. In total, the three companies increased their daily round trip from 138 to 200, and the daily seat capacity from 18,000 to 26,000. Ålesund had the largest increase, from seven daily round trips with only Braathens, to seventeen offered by all three companies.

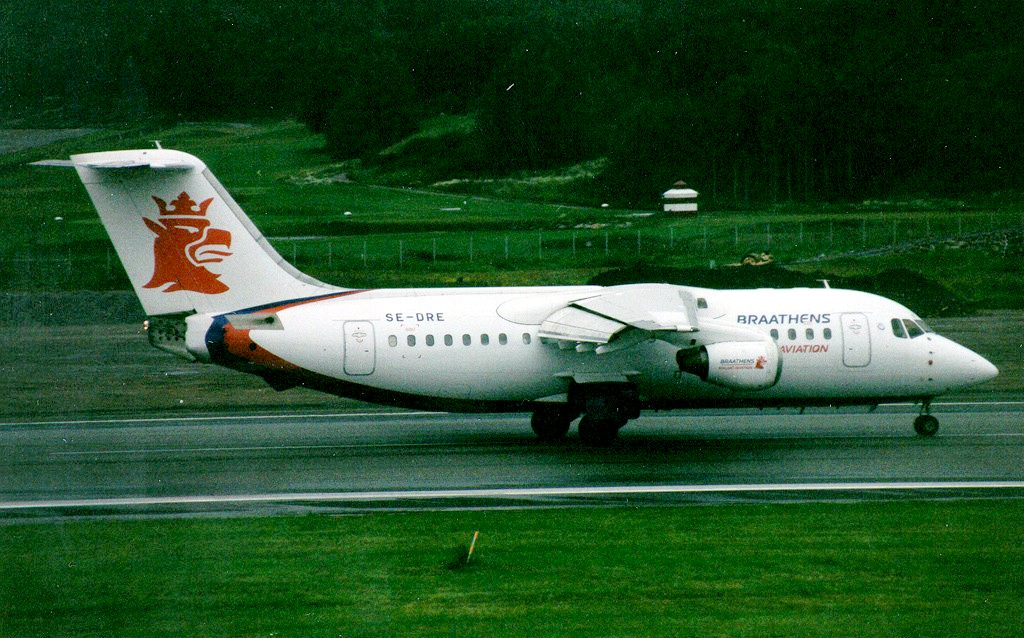
Braathens bought Malmö Aviation in 1998

In late 1998 and early 1999, KLM and Braathens introduced direct flights from Sandefjord and Kristiansand to Amsterdam. Braathens also started flights from Sandefjord to Stavanger and Bergen. On 1 May 1999, Northwest Airlines started flights to its hub at Minneapolis-Saint Paul International Airport in the United States. This service was terminated in October. The Northwest service had a connection to Stockholm as well as a new route from Oslo to Gothenburg, operated by Braathens. After Northwest announced the withdrawal of their service, the Gothenburg service was also terminated.

In November 1998, Color Air introduced a new cheapest ticket for NOK 345. After the winter settled, the ice front between Color Air and Braathens grew colder following Braathens' denying Color Air to use their deicing equipment at Ålesund, resulting in the plane being stuck at the airport. By the end of 1998, it became clear that Braathens had increased capacity with 20%, but only achieved a 5.2% ridership increase after the opening of Gardermoen. Similar numbers were applicable for SAS. The business market, in particular the large corporations with divisions in several cities, were demanding high frequencies on the routes. Color Air could get by with fewer departures, because they mainly targeted the leisure segment. In particular, the routes from Oslo to Ålesund and Kristiansand had a very low seat utilization; to Ålesund there were 1.2 million flown seats annually, but only 345,000 passengers, giving a 29% cabin load.

In September 1999, SAS announced that if Braathens took the first step to reduce capacity between Bergen and Oslo, they would follow immediately to reduce the overcapacity in the combined 37 daily departures. However, Braathens was not willing to reduce. On 15 September, Color Air announced that they would start flying five round trips from Oslo to Stavanger on 1 October, following the delivery of their fourth aircraft. At the same time, the airline would reduce the number of round trips to Ålesund from four to two. In January 1999, Braathens applied to register twenty of its Norwegian aircraft in Sweden, following their discovery that foreign-registered aircraft, such as Color Air's and SAS', did not have to pay value added tax on good sold on board. This was rejected by the Norwegian Armed Forces, who based their need of transport of military personnel during wartime on requisition of civilian, Norwegian-registered aircraft. The same month, Geir Olsen, head of Braathens in Sweden, withdrew from his position, due to disagreements about the corporate strategy.

On 27 September 1999, Color Air terminated all flights and ceased operations. On the day of the termination, the stock price of Braathens increased by 16%. Immediately following the bankruptcy, the two airlines increased their prices. Subsequently, Braathens increased their ticket price by 15%, but stated that this had nothing to do with the elimination of competition, since the price increase was not on any Oslo routes. In November, Braathens started to remove routes, and announced they would increase prices by 20%. They also reintroduced the Flag of Norway on the tail, which since the rebranding had been replaced by a silver, abstract wing. Both Braathens and SAS lost more than NOK 1 billion in 1999, totaling the cost of the price war between the three airlines to exceed NOK 3 billion.

== Crisis ==
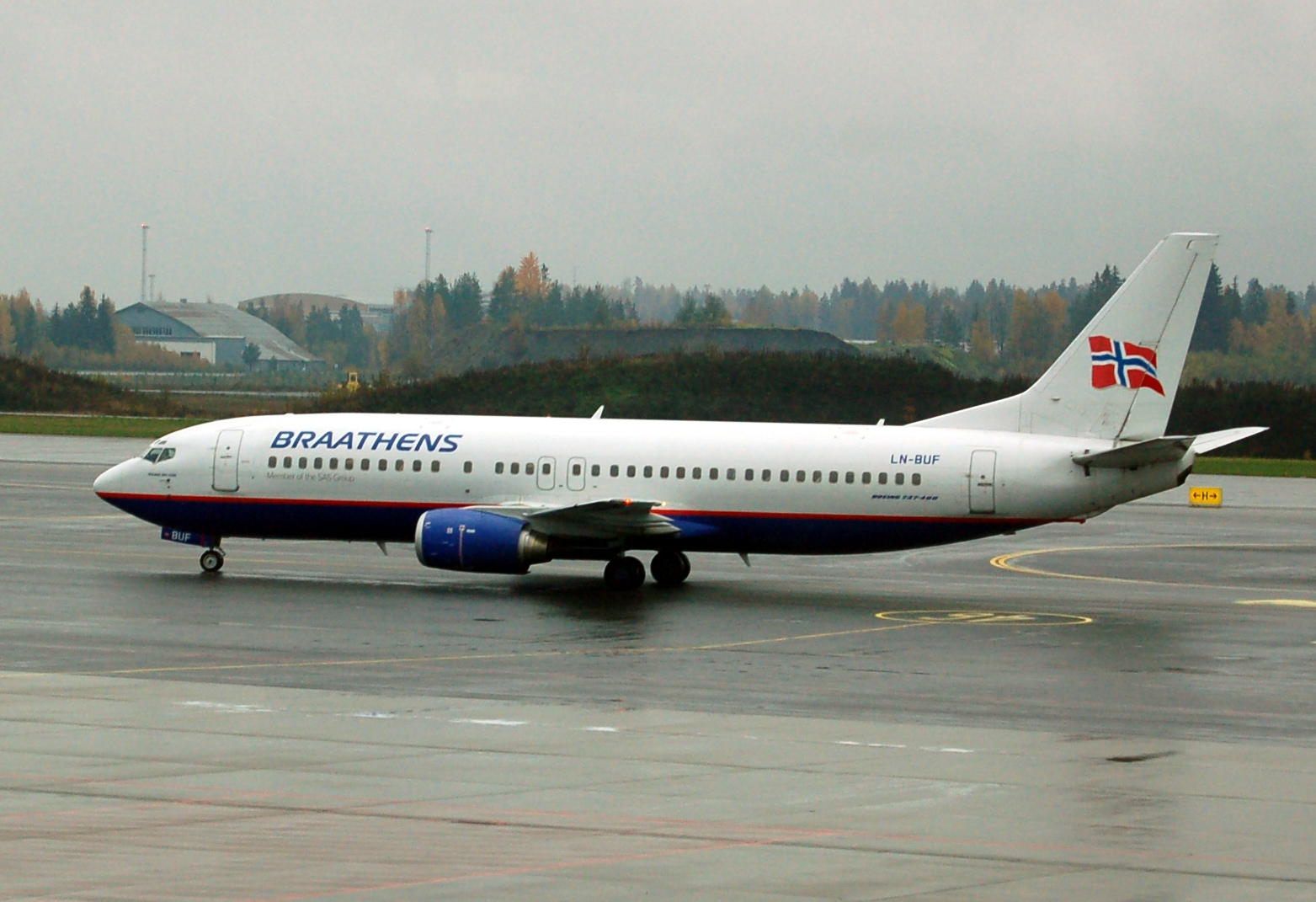
A Braathens Boeing 737-400 at Oslo Airport, Gardermoen. This was the last livery used by Braathens, modified with the re-introduction of the Norwegian flag on the tailplane.

On 23 July 1999, Braathens replaced its CEO with Arne A. Jensen. He introduced the program Improve 800, that was to improve the bottom line with NOK 800 million. In February 1999, Braathens merged the Swedish division with Malmö Aviation, to create Braathens Malmö Aviation. At the same time, the airline removed the 'Best' and 'Back' scheme on domestic Swedish flights. In November, Braathens terminated all services in Sweden that were inherited from Transwede. The Fokker 100 aircraft and Boeing 737-300 aircraft were sold, and the service from Oslo to Stockholm taken over by the company's Norwegian department. Malmö Aviation retained on flights from Stockholm-Bromma to Gothenburg and Malmö, as well as to London City. In addition, a Stockholm to Halmstad Airport service was started. In 1999, Braathens lost SEK 300 million in Sweden, bringing the total loss of Braathens Swedish operations since 1996 to SEK 600 million. At the same time, Braathens terminated its services from Sandefjord to Stavanger and Bergen, and the route from Oslo to Haugesund. From 25 June 2000, the company also terminated its Oslo to Stockholm route. Instead, the planes were put into service to Málaga and Alicante.

During 1999, domestic air ticket prices increased 9.2%, and another 17% the following year. By 2001, the domestic capacity was below the level before Gardermoen opened. Braathens and SAS started cooperating to set the full-price tickets on routes to eleven cities. This meant that the prices were identical on all the routes where both airlines flew, although they were not allowed to make such cooperation with discounted tickets. During the crisis, Braathens had sold several aircraft and started leasing them back to gain liquidity. The company announced in 2000 that they were considering purchasing a smaller type of aircraft, that would replace the 737s on some routes, and that would allow Braathens to start operating the Norwegian Air Shuttle services themselves.

The 'Best' and 'Back' service was highly criticized by analysts and customers. Braathens SAFE had a strong image, and unlike SAS, that was branded as 'The Businessman's Airline', Braathens SAFE was seen as the people's airline. It also drew goodwill from being Norwegian-owned, and that it displayed the Flag of Norway on the tailplane. Prior to the rebranding, no airline in Norway had ever operated a two-class service on domestic flights—including SAS. Professor of Sociology Per Morten Schiefloe commented that the introduction of segregation of passengers offended passengers. Customers who previously had been paying full price, became more aware of the savings on using 'Back' tickets. At the same time, people who wanted to travel with discounted tickets felt that they got better service and were not treated as second-rate customers with SAS. This caused Braathens to lose customers at both ends. The rebranding itself not only cost money to initiate, but also increased operating expenses, because cabin crew needed to move the curtain depending on the number of passengers on each class. Planes were sometimes delayed for hours, particularly in the beginning of the service, due to the increased work load on the handling and cabin crew.

On 25 November 2000, Braathens terminated the route to Murmansk. On 2 January 2001, they also terminated the routes from Molde to Kristiansand and from Kristiansand to Trondheim, the routes to Røros from Trondheim and Oslo, and the services from Oslo to Newcastle. The routes from Bergen to Haugesund were reduced from five to three round trips, and the Bergen–Molde–Trondheim route was reduced from four to three. The capacity on the routes from Oslo to Molde and Kristiansund were increased. A second round trip was introduced from Stavanger to Newcastle, flown by Norwegian Air Shuttle. From 15 February, the airline introduced four weekly services from Oslo to Barcelona, and from 1 March, three weekly round trips to directly from Longyearbyen to Oslo. A direct service was introduced from Bergen to Alicante from 7 April.

== Take-over ==
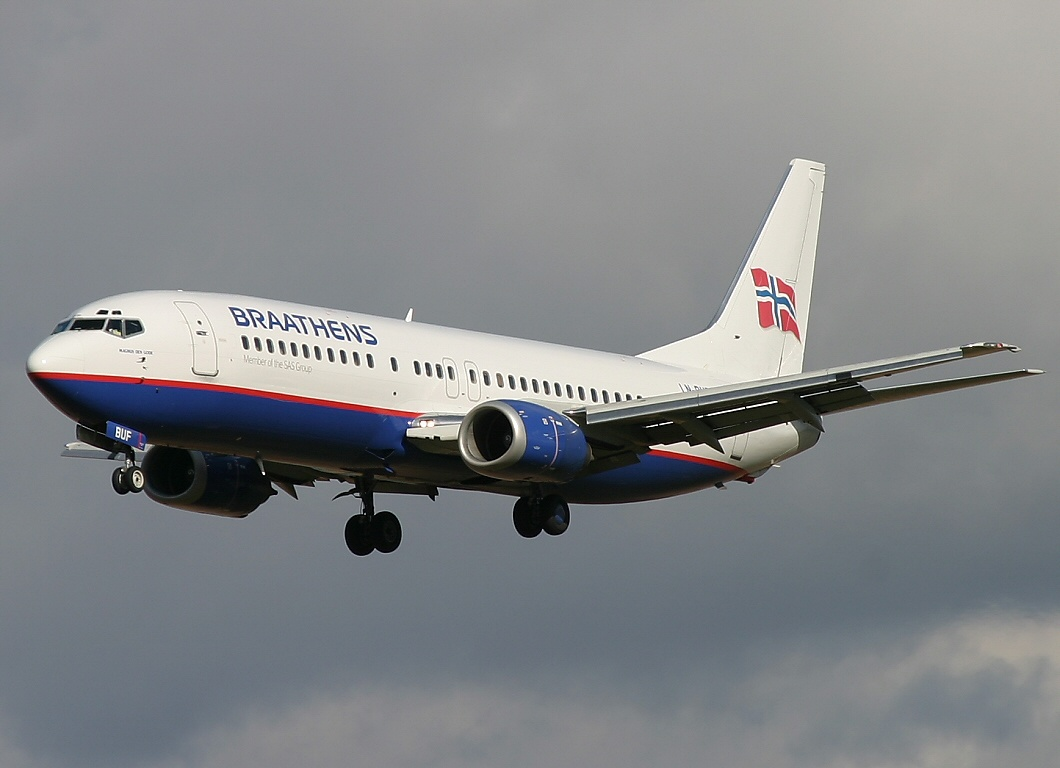
Boeing 737-400 in 2004; the Braathens livery is still in use, but with the subtext "Member of the SAS Group"

On 21 May 2001, SAS and Braathens announced that KLM and Braathens Rederi had agreed to sell their 69% stake in Braathens for NOK 800 million to SAS—valuating Braathens to NOK 1.1 billion. Braathens had contacted British Airways, but they had stated that they did not wish to purchase Braathens. The deal with SAS was initiated by Braathens; they stated that this would allow the two companies to cooperate to eliminate the overcapacity in the domestic market. Because both airlines operated a fleet of Boeing 737 aircraft, about NOK 150 million could be saved in maintenance. The agreement also involved that Malmö Aviation would have to be sold before the take-over. If not, the Braathens family would purchase the airline for NOK 1. At the same time, the family-owned companies guaranteed for about NOK 1 billion in the Swedish subsidiary.

The Norwegian Competition Authority announced that since the new company would have all domestic scheduled services between primary airports, it was unlikely that the take-over would receive permission from them. However, it was stated that one solution could be that the companies discontinue their frequent flyer programs. On 20 August, the Competition Authority declared that SAS was not allowed to purchase Braathens; the ruling was appealed by SAS and Braathens. Analysts stated that Braathens could be bankrupt by the time the appeal was processed. The Competition Authority stated that their denial of the take-over was that the reduction of capacity would remove the airline's incentive to provide discounted tickets, because they would not have to use them to capture travelers with lower willingness to pay from the competitor, and that they would not need low-paying customers to fill up the vacant seats. Instead, the authority wanted the politicians to reduce the taxes on flights. While Braathens also was opposed to the tax, they felt that removing it then was too late to save the company.

CEO Arne A. Jensen stated to the press that he felt that the cause of the problems were made in 1993, when the airline failed to make the correct choices in relation to the deregulation. He stated that he felt that part of the cause was that KLM and the Braathens family had cancelled a planned private placement. He further stated that a monopoly was the best for society, the passengers and the employees. He also stated that if the appeal failed, he had a "Plan B", involving a much smaller airline that would compete with SAS on the main routes. From October, the airline terminated its service to Milan and reduced capacity on some domestic routes; this removed the need for two aircraft. In addition, the airline increased all ticket prices with 5%, due to higher insurance costs.

On 23 October 2001, the Competition Authority granted permission for SAS to purchase Braathens. The rationale was that there were no other realistic purchasers for the airline, and that a bankruptcy was imminent without the take-over. As a condition, the authority decided to regulate a ban on frequent flyer programs, and stated that it would ban cross-subsidization aimed at underbidding or operating at a loss to force new entrants out of the market.

== Coordinated operation ==
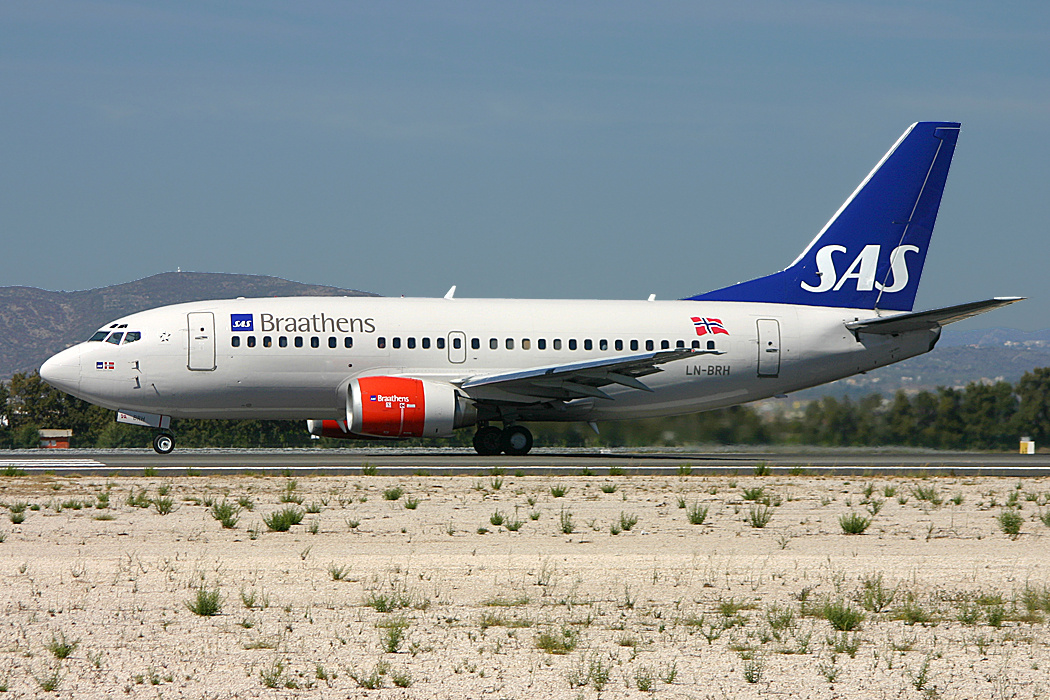
A SAS Braathens Boeing 737-500

By then, SAS had taken sixteen aircraft out of service, reduced production with 12% and fired 1,000 employees. The airline stated that they wished to renegotiate the agreement with the Braathens family and KLM to reduce the price. Because there had arisen a situation with high over-capacity of aircraft, the value of planes had fallen. In addition, SAS demanded that Braathens reduce its fleet from 33 to 23 aircraft if the deal was to go through, threatening to terminate the purchase if the airline did not abide.

On 2 April 2002, SAS and Braathens split all the routes between them. SAS started flying on the main-haul routes from Oslo to Trondheim, Bergen and Stavanger, with only a few flights to Stavanger flown by Braathens to get planes to the technical base there. From Oslo and Trondheim to Northern Norway, all routes were taken over by Braathens, with exception of a few flights made by SAS to Tromsø and Bodø. SAS also withdrew their flights from Oslo to Kristiansand and Ålesund, and Braathens increased their frequency on the route. Braathens retained the routes it had flown where SAS had not formerly flown. Braathens also kept the international flights to Barcelona, Nice, Málaga and Alicante. This reduced the overcapacity in the market, and allowed the SAS Group to save between NOK 600 and 900 million.

For a short period, members of both Wings and SAS' EuroBonus could collect points from the other airlines. But from 1 July, the awarding of frequent flyer miles on domestic flights was no longer permitted. From 1 April 2003, the West Coast routes, which had been on contract with Norwegian Air Shuttle, were taken over by SAS Commuter.

On 24 April 2002, SAS announced that all handling services operated by Braathens would be taken over by SAS Ground Services. All SAS employees would be prioritized in the rationalization process, and 800 Braathens employees were laid off. Three hundred Braathens' employees were offered jobs with SAS Ground Services, but these lost their seniority. No employees in SAS lost their jobs. The case ended in the courts, where 369 former Braathens employees sued SAS to receive the same seniority as they had in Braathens. On 15 October 2003, Asker and Bærum District Court decided that only 42 of the employees, those working in Kristiansund and Molde, had right to keep their seniority. The case was appealed, and on 18 March 2005, Borgarting Court of Appeal, with four against three votes, decided in favor of SAS, denying the employees their claim. The matter was not settled until 31 January 2006, when the Supreme Court of Norway ruled in favor of the employees.

By 2004, Braathens had managed to cut costs sufficiently to make a profit. At the same time, SAS was having problems making a profit. SAS announced on 10 March 2004 that SAS and Braathens would be merged into a single company, SAS Braathens, in May. At the same time, the airline would create separate national airlines for Sweden and Denmark. SAS Braathens would operate 50 aircraft, all variations of the 737. The company took over the operating licence of Braathens, including the IATA and ICAO code, and callsign. Because all the operations streamlined and coordinated, there would be no further downstaffing due to the merger. From 1 June 2007, SAS Braathens was rebranded to Scandinavian Airlines, making it identical to the branding in Sweden and Denmark, although it remain a separate limited company named SAS Norge AS.
