= Color Air =

Norwegian low-cost airline

IATA	ICAO	Call sign
CL	CLA	PENNANT
- Founded: 1998
- Commenced operations: 1 August 1998
- Ceased operations: 1999
- Hubs: Oslo Airport, Gardermoen
- Fleet size: 3
- Destinations: 5
- Parent company: Color Group
- Headquarters: Oslo
- Key people: Olav Nils Sunde (founder); Ove Johan Solem (CEO)

Color Air AS was the first Norwegian low-cost airline. It operated from Oslo Airport, Gardermoen in 1998 and 1999 with a fleet of three Boeing 737-300 aircraft. Color Air was a brand extension of Color Line, which shared a common owner in the Olav Nils Sunde-controlled Color Group. The airline operated five daily round trips from Oslo to Trondheim and Bergen, four to Ålesund and one to London, in addition to a weekly trip to Alicante. Color Air pioneered the low-cost business model in Norway, with a denser seating, no frills and lack of a frequent flyer program. Tickets were sold only via the Internet, by telephone or in supermarkets; when bought from travel agents, there was a 200 kr surcharge.

The airline was established in response to the opening of Gardermoen, which would allow any airline sufficient landing slots to compete with the incumbents Braathens and Scandinavian Airlines (SAS). Color Air commenced operations on 1 August 1998, with the two other airlines moving from Oslo Airport, Fornebu on 8 October. Following the airline's establishment, a price war broke out between it and the two incumbents. All three increased capacity and dropped prices, giving a 40% increase in seats on the dominant domestic routes and seat loads of between 30 and 50 percent. After thirteen months and NOK 400 million in losses, Color Air gave up and filed for bankruptcy. The price war cost the three airlines more than NOK 3 billion, and ultimately forced the other two to merge.

== Service ==
All flights were based at Oslo Airport, Gardermoen. For the summer routes of 1999, Color Air operated four daily round trips to Ålesund Airport, Vigra, and five daily round trips to Bergen Airport, Flesland and Trondheim Airport, Værnes. In addition, there was a single daily round trip to London Stansted Airport, and a weekly round trip to Alicante Airport. From each domestic destination, flights were made to correspond with the Color Line cruiseferries departing from Oslo to Kiel, Germany, and Hirtshals, Denmark.

Color Air had only one seating class, offered no on-board beverages and had no frequent flyer program or lounges. Color Air had an agreement for tickets to be sold at the Rimi supermarkets, as well as by phone and Internet. If bought at a travel agency, there was a NOK 200 surcharge. This was because Color Air was not linked to the Amadeus booking system, owing to the costs associated with membership.

== Fleet ==
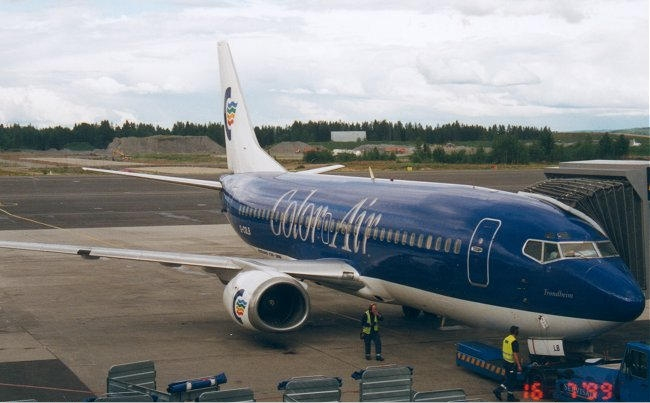
Color Air Boeing 737-300 at Oslo Airport, Gardermoen in 1999

The airline had three Boeing 737-300 aircraft, built in 1994. Originally fitted with 136 seats each, they were later reduced to 124, and then increased to 142. The aircraft were owned by International Lease Finance Corporation and General Electric Capital, and cost NOK 2.25 million per month to lease, plus additional costs per hour. They were British-registered and operated by Air Foyle HeavyLift, while maintenance was performed by British Midland. Both companies are based in the United Kingdom. Ground handling was carried out by SAS Ground Services in Trondheim, Bergen and Ålesund, and by Servisair in Oslo.

== Destinations ==
City	Country	IATA	ICAO	Airport
Ålesund	Norway	AES	ENAL	Ålesund Airport, Vigra
Alicante	Spain	ALC	LEAL	Alicante Airport
Bergen	Norway	BGO	ENBR	Bergen Airport, Flesland
London	United Kingdom	STN	EGSS	London Stansted Airport
Oslo	Norway	OSL	ENGM	Oslo Airport, Gardermoen
Trondheim	Norway	TRD	ENVA	Trondheim Airport, Værnes

== History ==
=== Background ===
With Norway joining the European Economic Area, the Norwegian airline market was deregulated from 1 April 1994. While airlines formerly needed a concession from the Ministry of Transport to fly a particular route, they could now compete freely on any domestic or international routes. Previously the two major airlines Scandinavian Airlines System (SAS) and Braathens SAFE each had their own routes, but from 1994 both established themselves on several of the main-haul routes.

With increased traffic, there soon became a capacity problem at Oslo Airport, Fornebu, the main hub for both SAS and Braathens. During the peak times during the morning and afternoon rush, there were no excess slots for new airlines. To compensate, the Norwegian Airport Administration was building a new main airport for Eastern Norway, to be located at Gardermoen. A larger terminal and two runways would give ample room for expansion, and entry of new airlines. The new airport opened on 8 October 1998.

=== Establishment ===
In January 1998, Olav Nils Sunde announced that he would establish a low-cost airline following the opening of the new airport. The company would be led by CEO Morten Andersen, who previously had been CEO of Norway Airlines, and the lawyer Stein Øxseth. Sunde would own 92% of the company through his shipping company Larvik Scandi Line, while Andersen and Øxseth would own 4% each. The company would be a brand extension of Sunde's shipping company Color Line. The company aimed at a 15–20% market share, with 1.4 million passengers annually. It was the first low-cost airline in Norway. The company launched tickets down to NOK 500 each way, and sold cheap tickets without demanding that the traveler be away during a weekend. Color Air made an agreement with the British airline Air Foyle HeavyLift to operate a fleet of Boeing 737-300 aircraft.

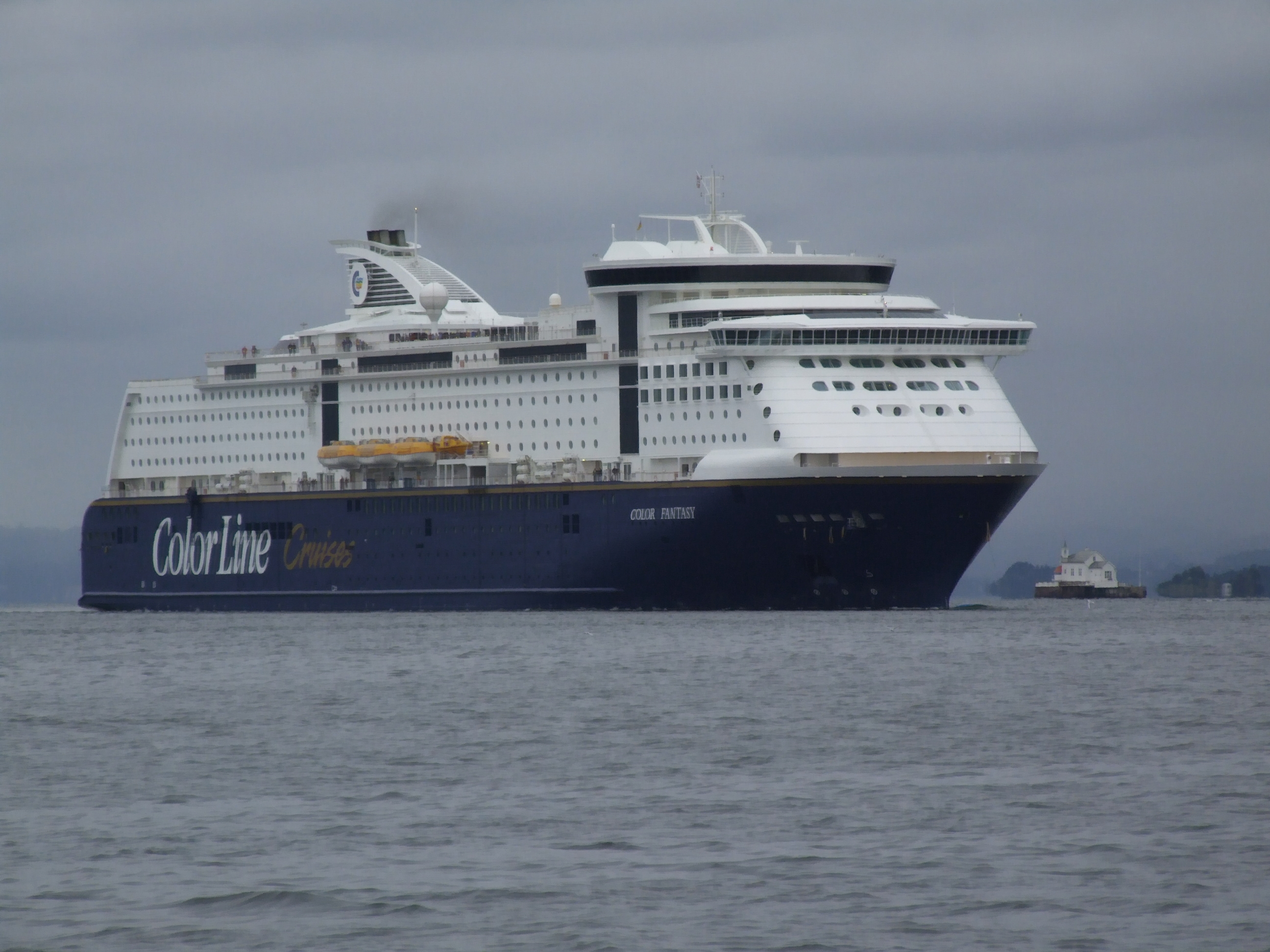
Color Air was a sister company of Color Line

Following the announcement to establish Color Air, Braathens SAFE chose to rebrand itself. They launched a new livery, and changed their name to just Braathens. Starting with the company's first Boeing 737-700 delivered on 23 March, Braathens introduced the business class, Braathens Best, that would take up 70% of the cabin, and the economy class Braathens Back, that would be at the back of the cabin. From 1 April, a new NOK 65 tax was introduced on all domestic flights. Braathens and SAS decided to divide the cross-subsidize the taxes between their routes, something Color Air was not able to do. This was because the tax was only valid for routes within Southern Norway; Braathens and SAS could therefore tacitly collude to increase the prices to Northern Norway, and thereby subsidize their routes in Southern Norway. Color Air, on the other hand, would be forced to put the full tax on all its departures. While the government had no way to hinder the incumbents from doing this, Gudmund Restad, Minister of Finance from the Centre Party, encouraged the airlines to not "cheat", and follow the intentions of the law, even if he admitted that there was nothing the government could do to hinder the airlines from cross-subsidizing.

The contract to lease two Boeing 737-300 aircraft from 1994 was made with International Lease Finance Corporation in May. Maintenance was outsourced to a British company, after Braathens, which also operated 737 Classic aircraft, had denied Color Air the use of its simulators and technical workshops. For the start-up, Color Air hired 18 pilots, 40 flight attendants and 40 ground employees, in addition to the administration. The company was criticized for only hiring women flight attendants. Braathens operated with an internal pension age of 58 years for its pilots, while SAS had a 60-year age limit. Due to EEA rules, the judicial age limit was 65 years, so Color Air was able to hire retired SAS and Braathens pilots. These could be paid only NOK 500,000 in annual wage, since they received a full pension from their old employers on top of it. The Norwegian Airline Pilots Association stated that this was morally reprehensible, but Color Air was supported by the Norwegian Civil Aviation Authority, medical experts, and SAS, who all claimed that there were no medical reasons to not let people in their 60s operate aircraft.

=== Start of operation ===
The first aircraft was delivered on 1 August 1998. While the new airport at Gardermoen would not officially open until 8 October, when also SAS and Braathens would move to the airport, Color Air started flights from Gardermoen to Ålesund Airport, Vigra on 6 August. Flights to Trondheim Airport, Værnes commenced on 8 August, while the Bergen Airport, Flesland-route started 15 August. After a week, very few passengers were traveling with Color Air, with two at the least and twenty-four at the most per departure. Color Air was losing NOK 650,000 per week of operation.

The pricing scheme was based on tickets for NOK 399, 499, 599 and 699, plus NOK 71 in taxes. At least ten tickets were available at the lowest price per departure, and the first to order were granted the cheapest tickets. Tickets had no restrictions on cancellation, and were not subject to restrictions on return dates.

With the opening of Gardermoen, both Braathens and SAS increased the number of flights. Braathens established a route to Haugesund, while SAS started routes to Ålesund and Kristiansand. The number of daily trips from Oslo for SAS increased from 59 to over 80. In total, the three companies increased their daily round trip from 138 to 200, and the daily seat capacity from 18,000 to 26,000. Ålesund had the largest increase, from seven daily round trips only with Braathens, to seventeen offered by all three companies. On the route to Trondheim, the number of departures had increased from 27 to 39, with Braathens operating 19, SAS 16 and Color Air 5. The increase in seats was profitable for the state; the new seat tax—which was also applicable to unsold seats—received an annual revenue increase of NOK 110 million.

The first plane planned to leave Gardermoen was an SAS aircraft. However, since it was 20 minutes delayed, a Color Air aircraft was instead the first to take off, at 06:52 on 8 August 1998. By the end of October, the airline had between 40 and 50% cabin load, and the company stated that it needed "slightly more than 50%" to make a profit. It also announced that it would receive three more aircraft to supplement the two it had in service. Instead of starting a route to Stavanger, the company instead chose to open a route to London Stansted Airport starting 1 December. The airline stated that it did not have sufficient aircraft do make more than two round trips to Stavanger, and that this would be too little to be a credible operator on the route.

=== Price war ===
In November, Color Air changed the conditions tied to purchase of tickets. Reduced price tickets were only available seven days or more before departure, and only full-price tickets could be refunded. At the same time, the maximum price increased to NOK 870, though all ticket prices were changed to include all taxes, after requirements from the authorities. A new, cheapest ticket was introduced at NOK 345, including taxes. After the winter settled, the front between Color Air and Braathens grew colder following Braathens' denying Color Air to use their deicing equipment at Ålesund, resulting in the plane being stuck at the airport.

In November, Color Air transported 102,544 passengers. From mid-December, the company had a time-limited offer of tickets for NOK 200.

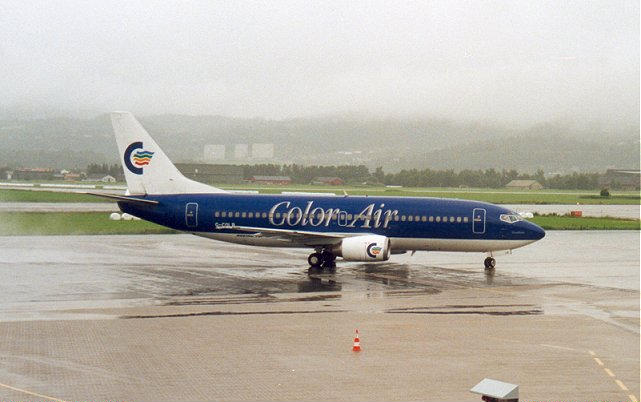
Color Air Boeing 737-300 at Trondheim Airport, Værnes

In September, the ownership of Color Air was rearranged. Sunde reallocated his ownership and created Color Group, that would wholly own both Color Line, Scandi Line, Larvik Line and Color Air. Sunde retained a 77% ownership in the corporation through Larvik Scandi Line. The group was subsequently listed on the Oslo Stock Exchange. In the general meeting held in December, two of the largest owners of Color Line, Vital Forsikring and the Government Pension Fund of Norway, both were opposed to the merger, as they felt the purchased companies were overvalued. Color Air was at the time valuated at NOK 157 million. After a long process between the minority shareholders and Color Group, the valuation was adjusted to NOK 108 million. In May, Olav Nils Sunde bought the entire Color Group, and delisted it from the stock exchange following the conflict with the other shareholders.

By the end of 1998, it became clear that Braathens had increased capacity by 20%, but only achieved a 5.2% ridership increase after the opening of Gardermoen. Similar numbers were applicable for SAS. The business market, in particular the large corporations with divisions in several large cities, were demanding high frequencies on the routes. Color Air could get by with fewer departures because they mainly targeted the leisure segment. In particular, the routes from Oslo to Ålesund and Kristiansand had a very low seat utilization; to Ålesund there were 1.2 million seats annually, but only 345,000 passengers, giving a 29% cabin load. Accumulated cabin load for Color Air was 32%, with 116,176 passengers. In the course of the last quarter of 1998, Color Air lost NOK 91 million, or NOK 1 million each day. For the whole year, Color Air had an average ticket price of NOK 453, giving a revenue of NOK 57 million. NOK 45 million was used on taxes, giving NOK 12 million to cover operating costs of NOK 209 million. The company lost NOK 197 million in 1998.

In February 1999, Braathens announced that they would re-register all their planes in Sweden to avoid having to pay value added tax on catering and fuel. Color Air and SAS, who had their planes registered abroad, had gotten away without paying the taxes, since it only applied to Norway-registered planes. Following this announcement, the Ministry of Finance changed the rules so also foreign-owned planes had to pay the tax. The change in rules cost Color Air NOK 10 million per plane per year. From 1 July 1999, the seat tax was removed, but replaced by an equivalent tax for each passenger. This made it cheaper to fly an empty plane, but more expensive to fly a full one. Color Air had reduced the number of seats in each plane to avoid the seat tax, but increased them again after the tax was removed.

In the first quarter of 1999, Color Air transported 100,472 passengers. This gave a cabin load of 35%, of which the Trondheim route had 40% and the Ålesund route 32%. This gave the airline a deficit of NOK 92 million. SAS lost NOK 22 million, while Braathens had lost NOK 300 million. In comparison, both Braathens and SAS Norway made a NOK 320 million profit in the first quarter of 1998.

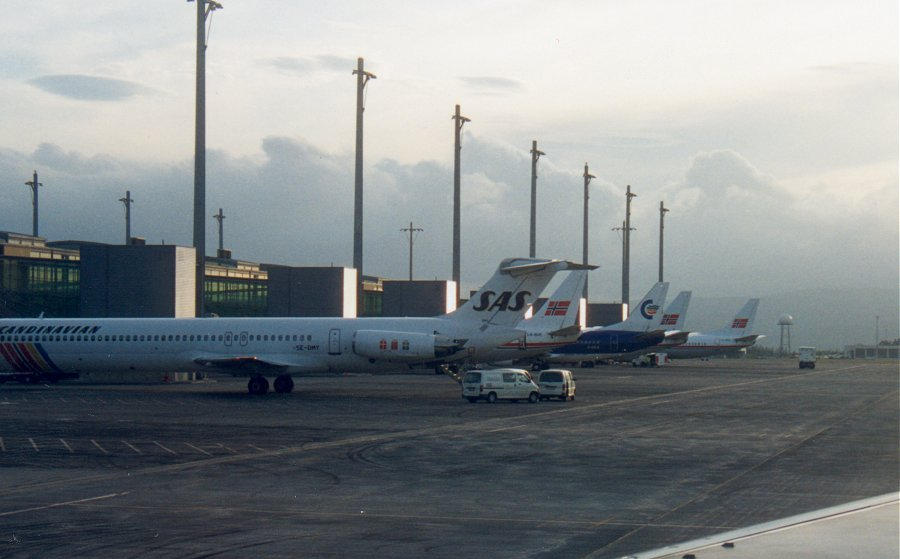
Color Air with its two competitors, Braathens and Scandinavian Airlines, at Oslo Airport, Gardermoen

On 1 April, Color Air won a two-year contract with Norway Post for all air mail from Oslo to Trondheim and Ålesund. On 10 April, Color Air started a weekly round trip each Saturday to Alicante Airport in Spain. On 12 April, Ove Johan Solem took over as CEO of Color Air. In May, the company increased the cabin load from 38 to 48%, with ridership increasing from 33,978 to 44,081. These numbers also included a change in the number of seats per plane. The following month, 46,777 people traveled with the airline. By the end of July, Color Air had lost NOK 350 million. However, in July, Color Air had a cabin load exceeding 50%, the level Sunde had stated was necessary to make a profit.

In September, SAS announced that if Braathens took the first step to reduce capacity between Bergen and Oslo, they would follow immediately to reduce the overcapacity in the combined 37 daily departures. However, Braathens was not willing to reduce. On 15 September, Color Air announced that they would start flying five round trips from Oslo to Stavanger Airport, Sola on 1 October, following the delivery of their fourth aircraft. At the same time, the airline would reduce the number of round trips to Ålesund from four to two. The load factor in August was 43%, and management stated that 50% load would not be sufficient to make money. In particular, the company stated that while aircraft were full during the weekends, the company was not succeeding at garnering the necessary business ridership to fill up the planes during the weekdays. To become more attractive, the company changed its fares to two classes: Business Full Flex and Saver No Flex. The company also stated that to attract more business travelers, it was looking for an international partner to conduct codesharing on international routes, and perhaps also introduce a frequent flyer program alone or in cooperation with the partner.

=== Bankruptcy ===
On 27 September 1999, Color Air terminated all flights and ceased operations. Sunde stated that he regretted having started the airline, and said that he had overestimated the synergies between his ferry company and the airline, but also underestimated the price elasticity for business travel. In particular, the frequent flyer programs that SAS and Braathens had made it difficult to convince corporate travelers to switch to Color Air. Sunde believed that the company would continue to lose money in 2000. 220 employees lost their jobs, while Color Group estimated it lost NOK 400 million on the airline. There were discussions concerning cooperation with, or a take-over by, British Airways, but these discussions did not lead to an agreement. In total, Color Air flew 430,000 passengers, effectively subsidizing each passenger with almost NOK 1000. The company was not declared bankrupt, as Sunde wanted to insure his good reputation by paying everyone he owed money. While this was about NOK 10 million in airport fees and smaller sums to other parties, the largest creditors were the two aircraft leasing companies, to whom NOK 270 million was owed for the rest of the rental period. The 20,000 people who had tickets with Color Air were all rebooked onto Braathens flights. After NOK 170 million in debt was registered by the company, and assets were only worth NOK 17 million, Color Air was declared bankrupt on 10 November 1999.

On the day of the termination, the stock price of Braathens increased by 16%, while SAS's increased 3%. Immediately following the bankruptcy, the two airlines increased their prices. Subsequently, Braathens increased their ticket price by 15%, but stated that this had nothing to do with the elimination of competition, since the price increase was not on any Oslo routes. In November, Braathens started to remove routes, and announced they would increase prices by 20%. They also reintroduced the Flag of Norway on the tailplane that since the rebranding had been replaced by a silver, abstract wing. Both Braathens and SAS lost more than NOK 1 billion in 1999, and the total cost of the price war between the three airlines exceeded NOK 3 billion.
