= Color Group =

Norwegian shipping and holding company

Color Group AS
- Founded: 1990
- Headquarters: Oslo, Norway
- Key people: Morten Garman, Chairman; Olav Nils Sunde, President
- Services: Passenger transportation Freight transportation Hotels
- Parent: O. N. Sunde
- Subsidiaries: Color Line; Color Hotel Skagen
- Website: www.colorline.no

Color Group AS is a Norwegian shipping and holding company, established in 1990 as a result of the merger between Jahre Line and Norway Line. The same year, Color Line took over Fred. Olsen Lines cruise-ferry operations and then expanded its business further.

In October 1996, the company acquired Larvik Line, while Scandi Line joined the group in September 1998. The Color Hotel Skagen was also acquired in September 1998. The company ventured into the airline industry with the establishment of Color Air, but had to withdraw within a year due to total loss of about NOK 400 million. It was for a period listed on the Oslo Stock Exchange, but is currently a subsidiary of O. N. Sunde.
