= O. N. Sunde =

Norwegian holding company

O. N. Sunde AS
- Company type: Private
- Industry: Holding company
- Founded: 1988
- Founder: Olav Nils Sunde
- Headquarters: Oslo, Norway
- Area served: Norway
- Revenue: NOK 6,627 million (2020)
- Operating income: NOK -440 million (2020)
- Net income: NOK -863 million (2020)
- Number of employees: 4,500 (2020)
- Website: www.onsunde.no/en/

O. N. Sunde is a Norwegian holding company owned by Olav Nils Sunde and family. Through its subsidiaries the group operates in many industries, including shipping, real estate, sports and clothing retail, automotive, and insulation. Important operating subsidiaries include Color Group, Sunpor Kunststoff, Voice Norge, ONS Shipholding and O.N. Sunde Eiendom. Corporate head offices are located in Oslo.

Among the brands managed by the group is the cruiseferry company Color Line, the retail brands Voice, Match, Boys of Europe, VIC, Jean Paul and the insulation brand Sunpor.
