= Voice Norge =

Norwegian clothing retail company

Voice Norge AS
- Company type: Private
- Industry: Clothing retail
- Founded: 1987; 39 years ago
- Headquarters: Bjølsen, Oslo, Norway
- Area served: Norway
- Key people: Sverre Helno (CEO); Olav Nils Sunde (chair)
- Parent: O. N. Sunde
- Website: www.voice.no

Voice Norge is a Norwegian clothing retail company.

It was established in 1987. In 2003 it was bought by Olav Nils Sunde, who delisted the company from the stock market. Chairperson before the takeover was Bjørn Rune Gjelsten.

A subsidiary of the holding company O. N. Sunde, the company has managed the retail stores Match, Decades and VIC. In October 2009, it was announced that Voice of Europe with its 77 stores nationwide became disestablished.
