= Norwegian Airline Pilots Association =

- Norsk Flygerforbund
- Founded: 1977; 49 years ago
- Headquarters: Drammensveien 43, N-0271 OSLO
- Location: Norway
- Members: 850
- Key people: Helge O. Anonsen, leader
- Affiliations: IFALPA
- Website: flyger.no

The Norwegian Airline Pilots Association (Norwegian: Norsk Flygerforbund, NF) is a trade union of civil airline pilots in Norway.

It was established as a merger in 1977. It has about 850 members, and has its headquarters in Drammensveien at Skillebekk, Oslo. It is a member body of the International Federation of Air Line Pilots' Associations, IFALPA.

Civil airlines pilots in Norway have also been members of the Confederation of Vocational Unions due to dissatisfaction with the Norwegian Airline Pilots Association. However, in 2016, the union affiliated to the Norwegian Confederation of Trade Unions. The following year, it absorbed the Norwegian Cockpit Union.
