= List of Airbus A300 operators =

A list of orders, deliveries, and current and previous operators of the Airbus A300 as of June 2025.

Airline	Country	B1	B2	B4	600	Still in operation	Notes
Aerocóndor Colombia	(Colombia)			1			First South American operator
Aerostan	(Kyrgyzstan)			2		1	
AeroUnion	(Mexico)			7	3		
Afriqiyah Airways	(Libya)				2		
Air Afrique	(Ivory Coast)			4	4		Ceased operations in 2002
Air Algérie	(Algeria)	1		2			A300B1 leased from Trans European Airways; A300B4 leased from Lufthansa
Air Atlanta Icelandic	(Iceland)				9		
Air France	(France)		11	14			Launch customer of the A300
Air Hong Kong	(Hong Kong)			1	13		
Air India	(India)			5			
Air Inter	(France)		16	6			Merged into Air France in 1997
Air Jamaica	(Jamaica)			8			
Air Maldives	(Maldives)			2			
Air Stork	(Moldova)			1			
Alitalia	(Italy)		2	12			
AMS Airlines	(Georgia (country))			5		1	
American Airlines	(United States)				35		
Apollo Airlines	(Greece)			3			Ceased operations in 1996
ASL Airlines Ireland	(Republic of Ireland)			17	8	6	
CEIBA Intercontinental	(Equatorial Guinea)			1			Operated by MNG Airlines
China Airlines	(Taiwan)			6	14		
China Eastern Airlines	(China)				13		
China Northern Airlines	(China)				8		Merged into China Southern Airlines in 2004
CityBird	(Belgium)				2		Ceased operations in 2001
Continental Airlines	(United States)			23			
Conair of Scandinavia	(Denmark)			3			Merged with Scanair to form Premiair in 1994
Cruzeiro do Sul	(Brazil)			2			
Eastern Air Lines	(United States)		2	32			Ceased operations in 1991; First U.S. operator
Easy Charter	(Georgia (country))			1	1	1	
Egyptair	(Egypt)			10	12		
Egyptair Cargo	(Egypt)			2	2		
Emirates	(United Arab Emirates)			1	6		A300B4 leased from Pakistan International Airlines
Etihad Airways	(United Arab Emirates)				3		Leased from Air Atlanta Icelandic
European Air Transport	(Belgium)			19	1		Merged into European Air Transport Leipzig in 2010
European Air Transport Leipzig	(Germany)				24	24	
FedEx Express	(United States)				71	65	Largest A300 operator
Finnair	(Finland)			2			
Galaxy Airlines	(Japan)				2		Ceased operations in 2008
Garuda Indonesia	(Indonesia)			9	13		
Georgian Star International	(Georgia (country))			3			Ceased operations in 2015
Geo Fly Airways	(Georgia (country))			1			
Global Air Transport	(Libya)			1			Leased from Air Stork
Global Jet UAE	(United Arab Emirates)				2		
GrandAir	(Philippines)			5			
Hapag-Lloyd Flug	(Germany)			9	1		A300-600 leased from Lufthansa
Iberia	(Spain)			9			
Indian Airlines	(India)		10	4			
Iran Air	(Iran)		8	6	4	5	
Iran Airtour	(Iran)			2	5	4	
Iraqi Airways	(Iraq)				1		
Japan Air System	(Japan)		9	8	22		Merged with Japan Airlines in 2006
Korean Air	(South Korea)			10	30		
Kuwait Airways	(Kuwait)			2	8		
Laker Airways	(United Kingdom)			3			Ceased operations in 1982
LaTur	(Mexico)				2		Ceased operations in 1991
Lufthansa	(Germany)		6	5	15		
Mahan Air	(Iran)		3	5	15		
Malaysia Airlines	(Malaysia)			6	1		A300-600 leased from Air Atlanta Icelandic
Maximus Air	(United Arab Emirates)				5		
Meraj Airlines	(Iran)				2	2	
Merpati Nusantara Airlines	(Indonesia)				1		Leased from Kuwait Airways
Middle East Airlines	(Lebanon)			1	1		
Midex Airlines	(United Arab Emirates)			6			
MNG Airlines	(Turkey)			13	8	5	
Moalem Aviation	(Kyrgyzstan)			3		3	
Monarch Airlines	(United Kingdom)				4		
MyCargo Airlines	(Turkey)				1		Operated by ACT Airlines
Olympic Airlines	(Greece)				6		
Onur Air	(Turkey)		2	4	8		
Pakistan International Airlines	(Pakistan)			13			
Pan Am	(United States)			13			Ceased operations in 1991
Pan Am (1996-1998)	(United States)			8			Merged with Carnival Air Lines in 1998
Philippine Airlines	(Philippines)			13			
Qantas	(Australia)			4			acquired with Australian Airlines in 1993
Qatar Airways	(Qatar)				16		
Qeshm Air	(Iran)			1	5	2	A300B4 leased from Onur Air
Saudi Arabian Airlines	(Saudi Arabia)		2	13	22		Several aircraft leased from various airlines
Scanair	(Denmark)			3			Sold to Conair of Scandinavia
Scandinavian Airlines	(Denmark) (Norway) (Sweden)		3	1			
Sempati Air	(Indonesia)			4			
Sigma Airlines	(Kazakhstan)			1			
Silk Road Cargo Business	(Uzbekistan)				1		
Singapore Airlines	(Singapore)			8			
Solinair	(Slovenia)			1	2	2	
South African Airways	(South Africa)		4	5			
Sudan Airways	(Sudan)			5	6		
TACA International Airlines	(El Salvador)			5			Operated by JHM Airlines Cargo
TAESA Lineas Aéreas	(Mexico)			2			
Thai Airways International	(Thailand)			14	21		
The Cargo Airlines	(Georgia (country))			3			
TMA Cargo	(Lebanon)			1			Ceased operations in 2014
TNT Airways	(Belgium)			4			
Tradewinds Airlines	(United States)			11			Rebranded as Sky Lease Cargo in 2009
Trans Australia Airlines	(Australia)			6			Merged into Qantas in 1993
Trans European Airways	(Belgium)	1		1			Sole commercial operator of the A300B1
Transcarga International Airways	(Venezuela)			4			
Tristar Air	(Egypt)			1			
Tunisair	(Tunisia)			3	4		
Unique Air	(United Arab Emirates)				2		
Uni-Top Airlines	(China)				7		Ceased operations in 2019
UPS Airlines	(United States)				53	52	
Uzbekistan Airways	(Uzbekistan)				2		Leased from Korean Air
Varig	(Brazil)			2			
VASP	(Brazil)		3				Ceased operations in 2005
Viasa	(Venezuela)			4			
Vietnam Airlines	(Vietnam)			2	1		

Data of planes that are still in operation through August 2024.

== See also ==
- List of Airbus A310 operators
- List of Airbus A330 operators
