= History of Maersk Air =

Maersk Air was a Danish airline that operated between 1969 and 2005. Owned by the eponymous A. P. Møller–Mærsk Group, it operated a mix of scheduled and chartered passenger and cargo services. Headquartered at Dragør, its main operating bases were Copenhagen Airport, Billund Airport and Esbjerg Airport. The airline had offshore helicopter operations from 1975 to 1999 and had three airline subsidiaries: Maersk Air UK, Maersk Commuter and Star Air.

The airline was founded on the foundations on the purchase of Falck Air on 21 February 1969. Fokker F27s were bought and domestic services from Copenhagen to Odense and Stauning. From 1971 to 1995 Maersk participated in Danair, which held a monopoly on all domestic services. Maersk Air was heavily involved in the inclusive tours market during the 1970s, operating the Boeing 720 and 737-200. From 1981 Maersk started international flights, first out of Billund and from the 1990s out of Copenhagen.

Maersk Air gradually invested in new aircraft, including the Fokker 50, Boeing 737 Classic and later the 737-700. During the 1990s the number of international services increased, often codesharing with foreign airlines. With the Danish airlines deregulated in 1995, Maersk first sought to compete with Scandinavian Airlines. They then created a cartel. After being exposed, the airline fell into a decline after 2001, posting large deficits from which it never recovered. The airline was bought by the FL Group and merged with Sterling Airlines in 2005.

== Establishment ==
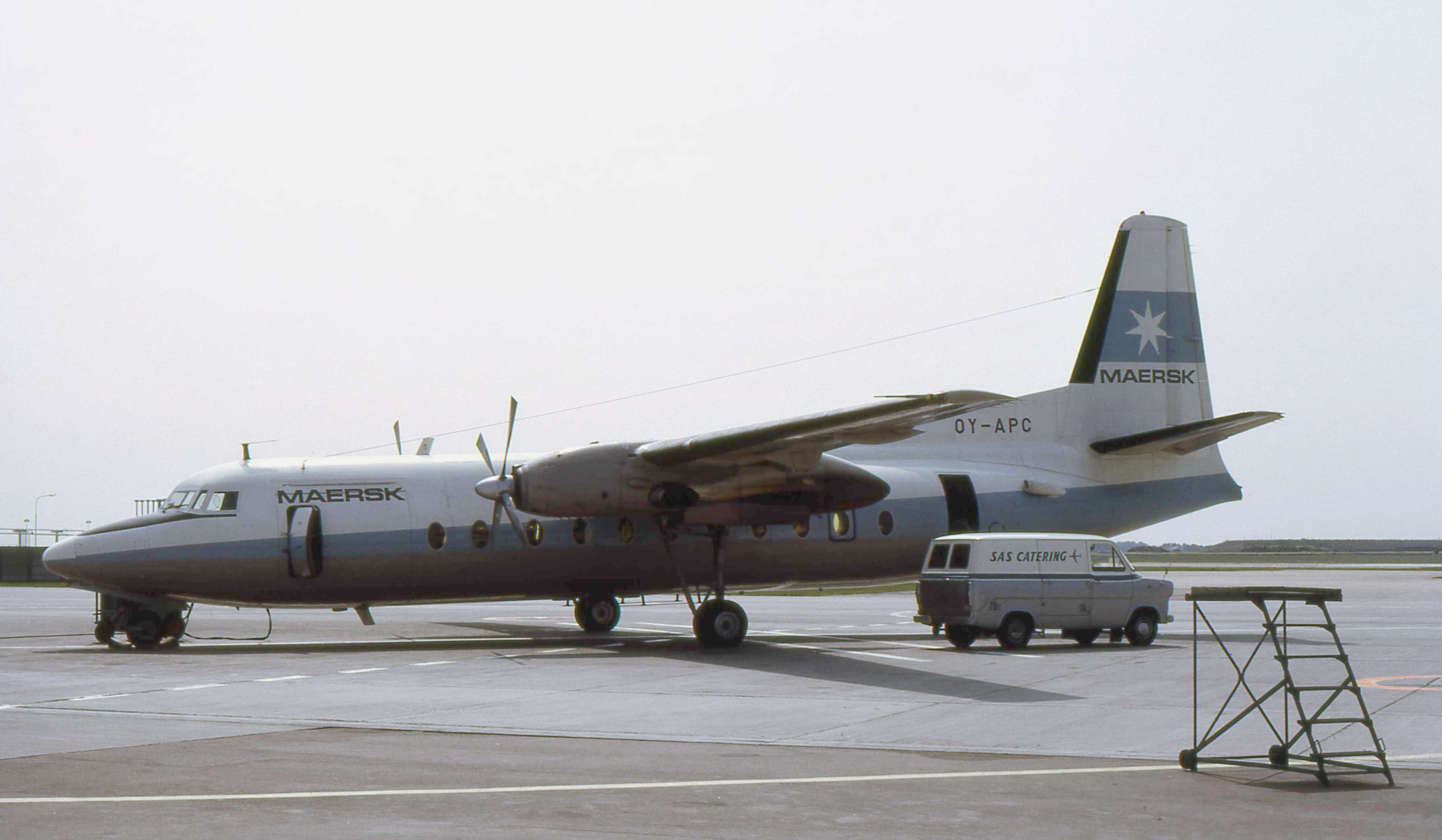
Fokker F27 Friendship at Pisa Airport in 1972

The A. P. Moller-Maersk Group's first invested in aviation in 1937, when it bought a stake in Danish Air Lines, Denmark's contemporary flag carrier. Work on starting their own airline started to take shape in 1967, when the executive management decided to purchase a corporate jet. They opted for a Hawker Siddeley HS 125-3B. Named Jette Mersk, it was used both to fly executives and to fly critical spare parts and mechanics around the globe to service mechanical error on board ships.

At the time there were few business opportunities for Danish airlines. The charter market was dominated by Spies Rejser and Tjæreborgs Rejser, each with their own airlines—Conair and Sterling, respectively. Scandinavian Airlines System (SAS) was the flag carrier and held the sole right to conduct international scheduled services. Freight charters could only be carried out by other airlines if the entire load had a single shipper and recipient. Bjarne Hansen, who was administratively responsible for the corporate jet, made several propositions for the Maersk Group to establish an airline. After several iterations, the plans were approved by CEO Arnold Mærsk Mc-Kinney Møller in 1969. The airline therefore aimed at ad-hoc charter with aircraft in the 50-seat market, and perhaps securing the rights to fly regional scheduled flights to smaller domestic airports.

To secure a running organization, Maersk bought Falck Air on 21 February 1969. There was internal disagreement about the airline's future strategy amongst its owner, the Falck Group. They therefore sold it as a discounted rate to Maersk. At the time Falck Air operated a fleet of two de Havilland Herons and two Hawker Siddeley HS 748 aircraft and a hangar at Copenhagen Airport, Kastrup. The airline had ordered three Fokker F27 Friendships, the first which was delivered on 9 December. The second was delivered on 17 December, but was written off ten days later when it crashed after failing to become airborne after a touch and go at Rønne Airport.

As part of the establishment, Maersk entered the travel agency industry. Originally named Maersk Air Rejsebureau, it was later anglicized to Maersk Travel. It gradually built up a nationwide network of travel agency outlets, in Ålborg, Århus, Copenhagen, Esbjerg, Herning, Horsens, Odense and Skive. Maersk Air also bought a share of Copenhagen Airport's ground handling company, Copenhagen Air Services, in 1972, which they owned along with SAS, Conair and Sterling.

== Initial operations ==
Maersk Air I/S was officially incorporated on 1 January 1970. The same day it took over the assets in Falk Air along with its air operator's certificate, concessions and the operational responsibility for the HS-125. Maersk Air I/S was organized as a partnership (interessentskab), which was again owned by two subsidiaries within the Maersk Group. This allowed the company to report less detailed accounts, and hindered competitors from gaining as good a picture of the company's financial and accounting situation. Norwegian-American Finn Rassmussen Ryssdal was hired as the airline's first director. He held the position for two years until he was replaced by another Norwegian, Johan Paus, former CEO of Scanair.

Operations to Odense Airport commenced on 26 December. Maersk received permission to operate a scheduled flight from Copenhagen to Stauning Airport from 1 November 1969. This service had previously been provided by Cimber Air. The initial scheduled operations consisted of five daily trip pairs from Copenhagen to Odense Airport, and two daily pairs to Stauning Airport.

The distribution of domestic routes was a contentious political issue. SAS held a privilege to commence any route they wished, but lacked regional airliners to serve the smaller airports. Norway and Sweden had seen extensive construction of regional and smaller primary airports earlier than in Denmark. In Norway the independent operator Braathens SAFE was allowed to operate a majority of the domestic services and in Sweden Linjeflyg had been established to fly the larger portion of domestic hauls. This had been met by skepticism in Denmark, where this was seen as a breach of the agreements establishing the SAS consortium. It also made some Danish politicians call for the establishment of a Danish domestic carrier.

Danish authorities therefore asked the three scheduled carries, SAS, Maersk and Cimber, to negotiate to see if they could reach an agreement. Consensus was reached in November 1971, whereby the company Danair was established. SAS held a 51-percent share of the company, while Maersk received 34 percent and Cimber 15 percent. Initially it was to organize domestic flights and in the long run the owners intended it to develop into a separate operator, although the latter never took place. Danair bought services from the three airlines, who retained flights to their respective destinations. Then Danair would set prices and sell tickets on the flights and the profits were paid out in relation to the ownership shares. The airlines were paid a fixed price, irrespective of their actual operating costs. Maersk fared better than SAS, as their regional airliners were more economical than SAS' Douglas DC-9 jetliners.

Flights to Vágar Airport on the Faroe Islands commenced in 1971. The airport had been served by Faroe Airways from the airport's opening in 1964 to 1968 and then in an intermediate period by SAS. Maersk took over the service as part of the Danair agreement and initially served it using F-27s. Thisted Airport opened in 1971 and Maersk was allocated as the operator. The Thisted and Stauning services were transferred to Cimber Air in 1976, although Maersk continued to operate some services. By 1973 there were 38,000 annual passengers at Thisted, but only 6,000 at Stauning. Maersk Air therefore decided in 1975 to terminate the Stauning services. This was met by opposition by four local members of Parliament. These took up the issue politically and were able to succeed at retaining the route. This resulted in the Thisted and Stauning routes were combined, giving the route Copenhagen–Stauning–Thisted–Copenhagen.

== Jetliners ==
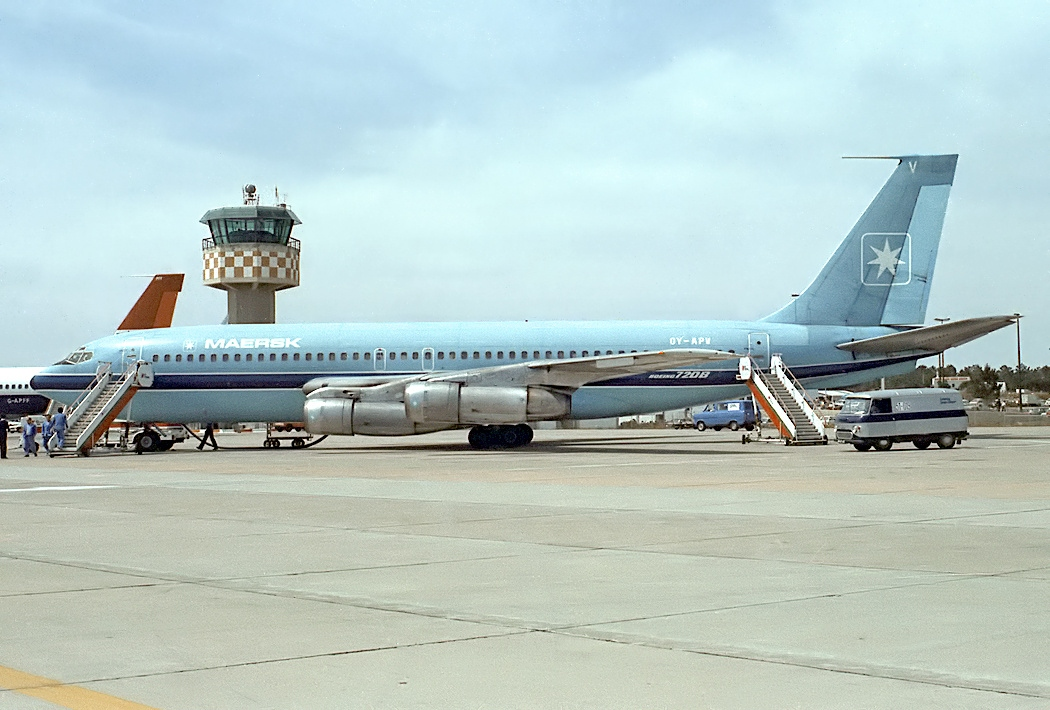
Boeing 720 at Faro Airport 1980

Given the nature of the mother company, Maersk Air looked at the possibilities to operate in the cargo segment. The F27s were bought with cargo doors, allowing them to be converted to freighters in half an hour. The airline aimed at buying a Boeing 747, but restrictions on freight caused these plans to be abandoned. However, they did purchase Oriental Air Transport Services, a cargo handling company based at Kastrup.

Maersk instead chose to target the inclusive tours charter market. The first customer was Karavane Rejser, who chartered a flight to Corsica. To gain better access to the market, Maersk bought two travel agents in December 1971, Raffels Rejser and Bangs Rejser. Thereafter the airline bought five used Boeing 720Bs in 1973. This was followed up with purchasing the tour operator Unisol in 1974. The three agencies were merged to form a new agency under the brand Unisol and 120,000 annual trips. Unisol—Denmark's third largest inclusive tours travel agency—was placed under the industrial department in Maersk, while the airline reported directly to the executive administration. This caused a lack of coordination between the companies and Maersk never made money from the inclusive tours operations.

Maersk Oil secured a monopoly in 1962 on exploration and extraction of any offshore petroleum in the Danish economic zone. By the 1970s they were operating oil platforms and needed helicopter transport to these. Maersk Air was contracted to perform this deed, for which it bought two Bell 212 helicopters. The airline stationed these at Esbjerg Airport and they commenced operations on 1 July 1975.

Maersk Air took delivery of its first two Boeing 737-200 Advanced in 1976. In January 1975 a Fokker F-27 was written off in a non-fatal crash during landing. At this time Maersk Air was considering introducing jetliners on the Faroe routes, but the 1,100-meter (3,600 ft) runway was a limiting factor By devising a plan whereby the flight would have a slow approach speed and received heavy-duty breaks, it was possible to introduce the Boeing 737-200 Advanced on the route. The first such service took place on 10 February 1977.

During the second half of the 1970s Maersk focused on wet leasing their larger 720-aircraft on the intercontinental market. Contracts included flying pilgrims from Morocco to Mecca and Scandinavians to North America. After having lost 100 million Danish krone (DKK) by 1979, Unisol was sold to Tjæreborg in 1980. A participating cause was Unisol's inability to profile itself in a market dominated by two high-profile, yet diametrical, owners.

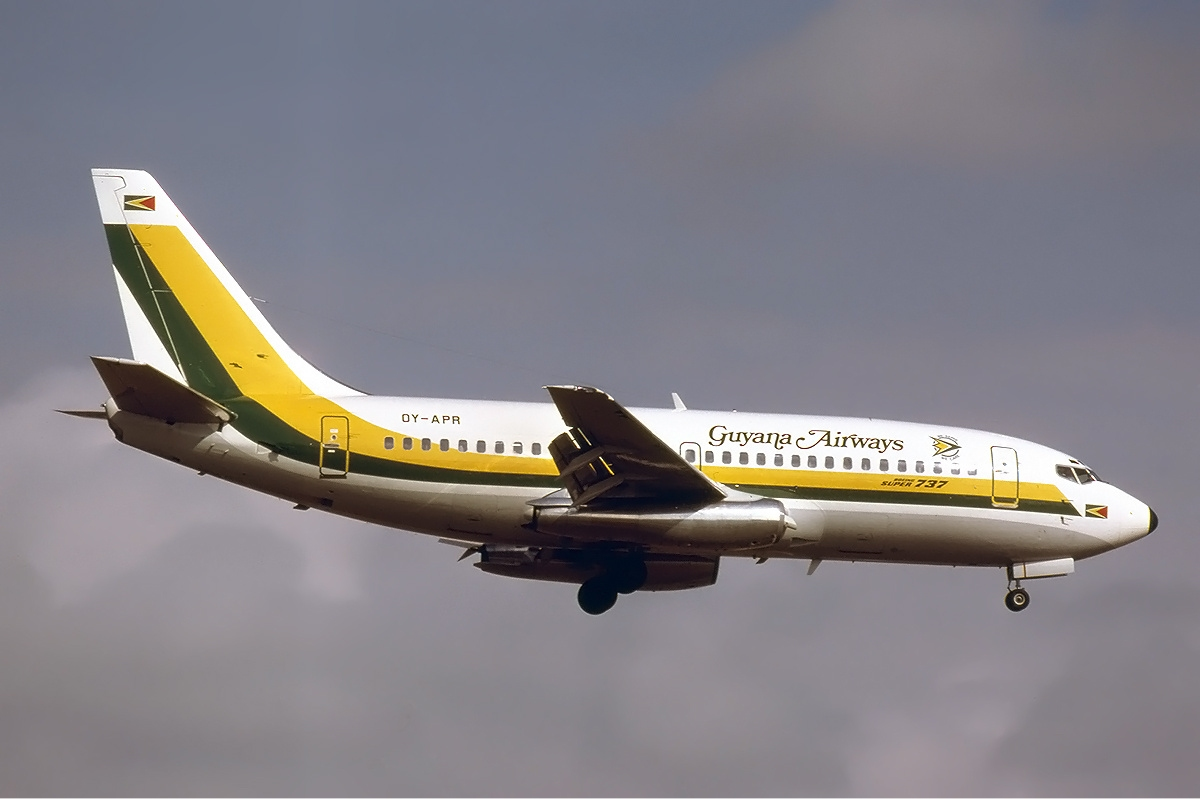
737-200 leased to Guyana Airways in 1980

Fourteen 737-200s had been delivered by 1981. Some were leased to other carries, including Guyana Airways, Malaysia Airlines and Tunisair. Others were used charter services, mostly to Danish inclusive tour operators. From 1983 three aircraft were entirely dedicated to this task. This was a highly competitive market, where Maersk had to compete with Conair, Sterling and Scanair, amongst others. The 737-200s proved too large for domestic services. The F27s had been sold and the airline therefore determined that it needed to procure new turboprops. A decision was made to buy the de Havilland Dash 7, but in the meantime the airline leased three HS 748s from 1980 to 1981. The first Dash 7 entered revenue service on 13 May 1981.

During the late 1970s Maersk Air was failing to make a profit. The revenue of DKK 535 million in 1979 fell to DKK 454 million in 1981, hitting a record loss of DKK 29 million in 1981. The company encountered problems with liquidity in 1981, when it was not able to pay its employees wages. The parent company were not willing to lend the airline any more. There was an understanding in the group's executive management that if the airline failed to get through the crisis it would be allowed for file for bankruptcy.

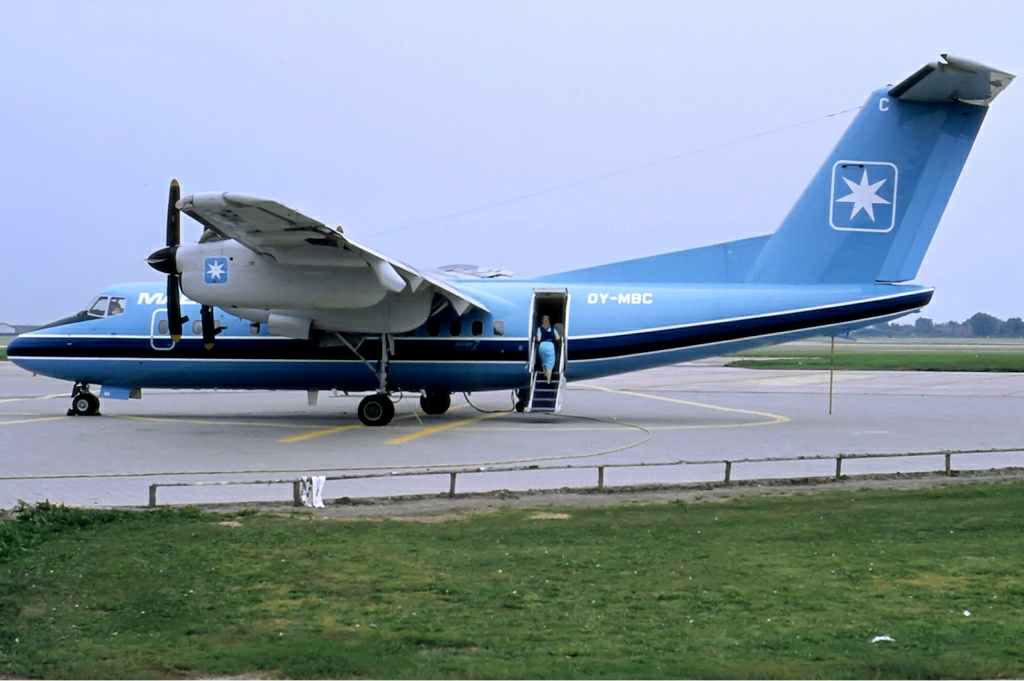
de Havilland Canada Dash 7 in 1982

Bjørn Hansen was hired as CEO in 1981, carrying out a restructuring of the company. The number of bases for charter aircraft was reduced, cutting personnel costs. Eleven of the airline's twenty-four aircraft were sold. A key part of this plan was not allowing the aircraft to remain idle during the daytime, thereby maximizing revenue. The number of employees were reduced from 720 to 480. By 1985 the revenue had risen to DKK 898 million in 1985, allowing the airline to make a profit of DKK 112 million in 1985.

Starting in 1981 Maersk Air started flying a Bell 212 under contract with the Cabinet of the Faroe Islands. By then the helicopter fleet had reached five Bell 212s. From 1983 the petroleum activity increased and two larger Eurocopter AS332 Super Pumas. On 2 January 1984 a Bell 212 crashed in the North Sea, killing the crew of two and a passenger.

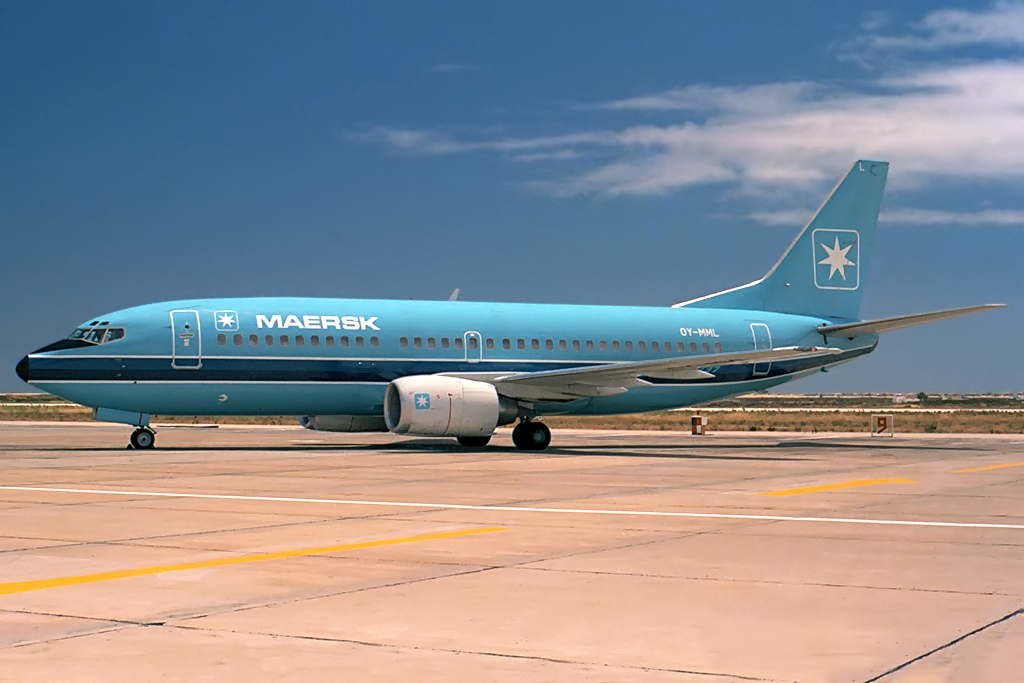
737-300 at Faro Airport 1986

Danair was reorganized from 27 September 1982. SAS's routes to Aalborg, Aarhus and Rønne were taken into the Danair pool. Maersk on its side increased the number of departures on its services. The goal was to improve profitability. And although the scheme did rise passenger numbers, it failed to improve Maersk Air's financial performance in the domestic market. Stauning was dropped from Maersk and Danair's scheduled from 1 January 1983.

The Faroe route was the airline's most lucrative, with profits 29 million in 1987. The Cabinet of the Faroe Islands wanted a share of this and in 1988 they, in cooperation with Cimber Air, established Atlantic Airways. Maersk protested and stated that as a Danair partner, Cimber could not operate a competing route. But with Cimber only purchasing 25 percent of the new airline, the clause did not come into effect. Atlantic Airways captured roughly half the market on the route. A large portion of this was new ridership, so Maersk's annual patronage on the route only fell from 100,000 to 80,000. However, the competition made it impossible for either airline to make a profit on the route. The Cimber Air case ended in arbitration and on 27 October 1994 the Maritime and Commercial Court found that Cimber Air had acted disloyally and sentenced them to pay Maersk Air a compensation of DKK 35.5 million.

Maersk took delivery of its first Boeing 737-300 in 1985. Half of Maersk Air's accumulative profits came from the sale of used aircraft. Inspired form the importance of crucial timing of purchase and sale of ships, Maersk Air made several advantages deals. One of the involved selling 737-200s for a higher price than they had paid for them. Maersk was an early customer of the Fokker 50, taking delivery of the first unit in 1988. As part of the purchase agreement, they would receive DKK one million per sold aircraft in the Nordic Counties. This turned out well as SAS and Braathens SAFE bought a combined twenty units.

== International ==
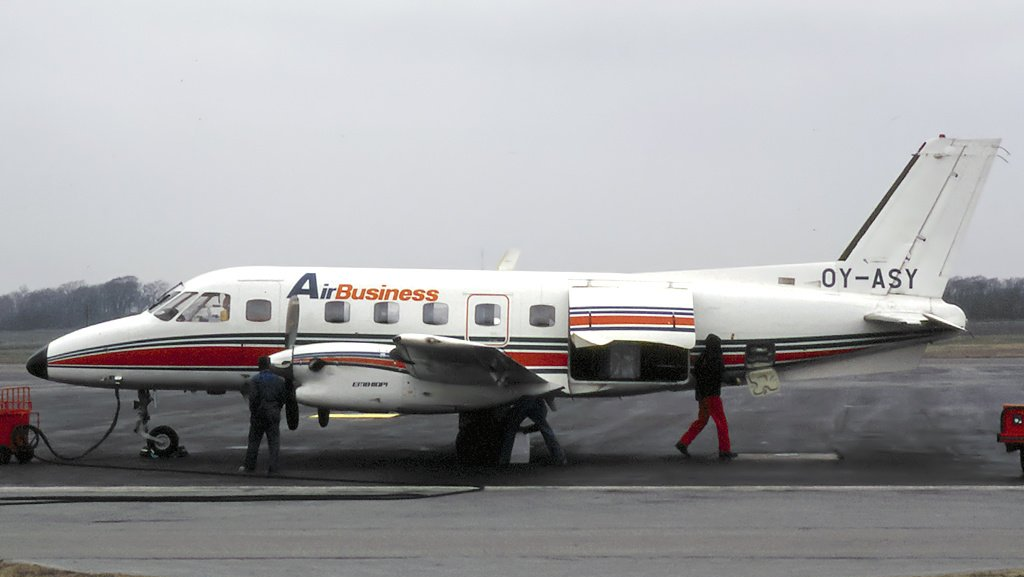
Embraer EMB 110 Bandeirante of Air Business at Esbjerg Airport in 1982

Maersk decided to look for possibilities to fly international routes. The first Danish non-SAS international concession was in 1981 granted to Air Business, who operated an Embraer Bandeirante from Esbjerg via Thistedt to Stavanger Airport, Sola in Norway from 1983. Maersk Air bought Air Business the following year, keeping it as a subsidiary. Soon the a change to the concession was granted allowing the flight to operate from Aalborg Airport instead of Thistedt, allowing for a greater catchment of passengers. The subsidiary airline took the name Maersk Commuter in 1988.

Changes in European Community rules in 1984 allowed any carrier to operate intra-European routes, granted that they connected two regional airports. Maersk laid its eyes on Billund Airport, which was centrally located in Jutland and was classified as a regional airport. It was already a popular base for charter flights. London was a favored destinations, but all the four primary airports (Heathrow, Gatwick, Stansted and Luton) were all categorized as primary airports. To exploit the new regulations, Maersk identified London Southend Airport, which was classified as a secondary airport.

Maersk inaugurated the route on 29 November 1984 with two round trips. The services were carried out using Dash 7s. Due to the distance from the city Maersk could not market it as "London" unless they provided an onward connection. This was done by bundling the tickets with a first-class ride onwards by train, staffed with Maersk cabin crew. The route carried about 12,000 passengers annually and failed to make a profit.

After having started routes from both Århus and Billund, Maersk initiated negotiations with both airlines regarding future services. Århus did not offer any services or help in marketing the airline. Billund on the other hand offered free landing fees the first year. The next service out of Billund was to Cologne Bonn Airport in Germany, in cooperation with Lufthansa. It was flown with the Fokker 50.

During the late 1980s Maersk Air started an expansion of its travel agencies. It bought Expert Rejser in 1987 and established international agencies in London, Hong Kong and Singapore. In the following years it bought several smaller agencies and in 1990 entered a cooperation with DSB Rejsebureau. A common agency was established in Esbjerg and negotiations regarding a fusion were initiated. But both parent companies wanted to be the "locomotive" in the new company, and the deal fell through.

As the European Union was working on deregulation of the airline industry, Maersk Air considered it necessary to continue to modernize its fleet to remain compete in the event it would at a later date have to compete with SAS. It needed a smaller aircraft than the 737-300 to replace it aging 737-200s and thereby asked Boeing to deliver a shortened version. With this request coming from Maersk and other 737 customers, Boeing launched the 737-500. Maersk took delivery of its first -500 on 6 April 1990.

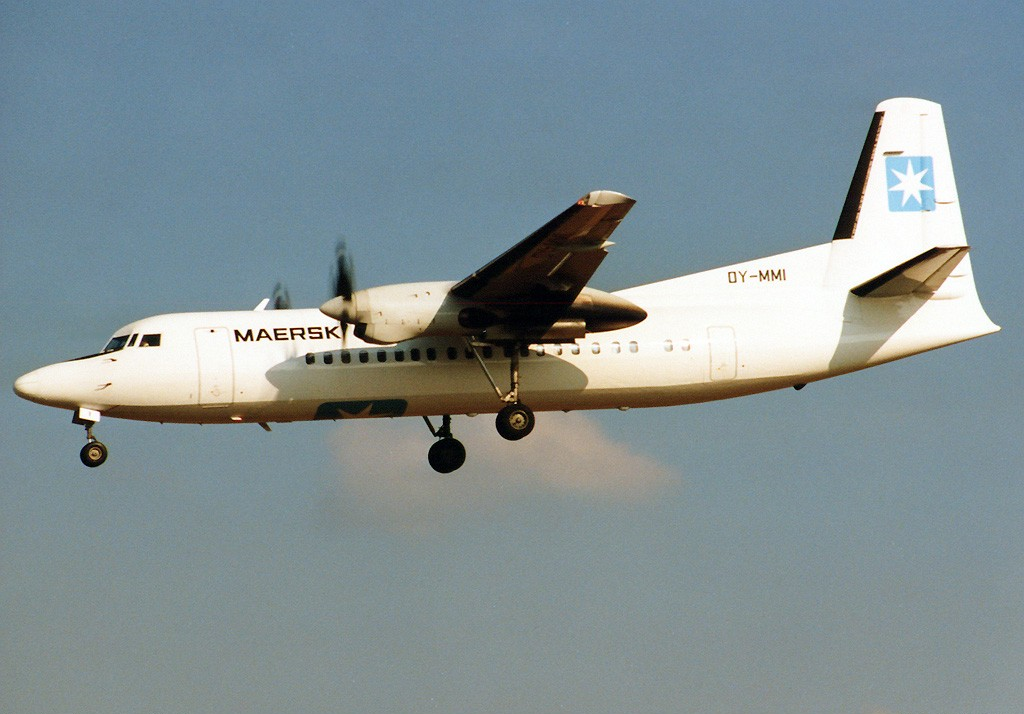
Fokker 50 at Brussels Airport in 1996

From 1990 Maersk was free to compete on any intra-European international route. It focused on routes out of Billund, providing services to Amsterdam Airport Schiphol, Brussels Airport, London Gatwick Airport, Stockholm Arlanda Airport and Stavanger. In addition it flew from Copenhagen to London. All the new services were flown using the 737-500. The shift from Southend to Gatwick allowed patronage to rise to 100,00 per year and the airline to make a profit on the London route.

Airline traffic fell in 1991 after the break-out of the Gulf War and Maersk Air failed to reach its targets for the international services. By 1991 revenue had risen to DKK 1,293 million, but the profit had fallen year by year until the company ran into a loss of DKK 25 million that year. However, the tides turned and the airline was again making profits in 1992.

== New airlines ==
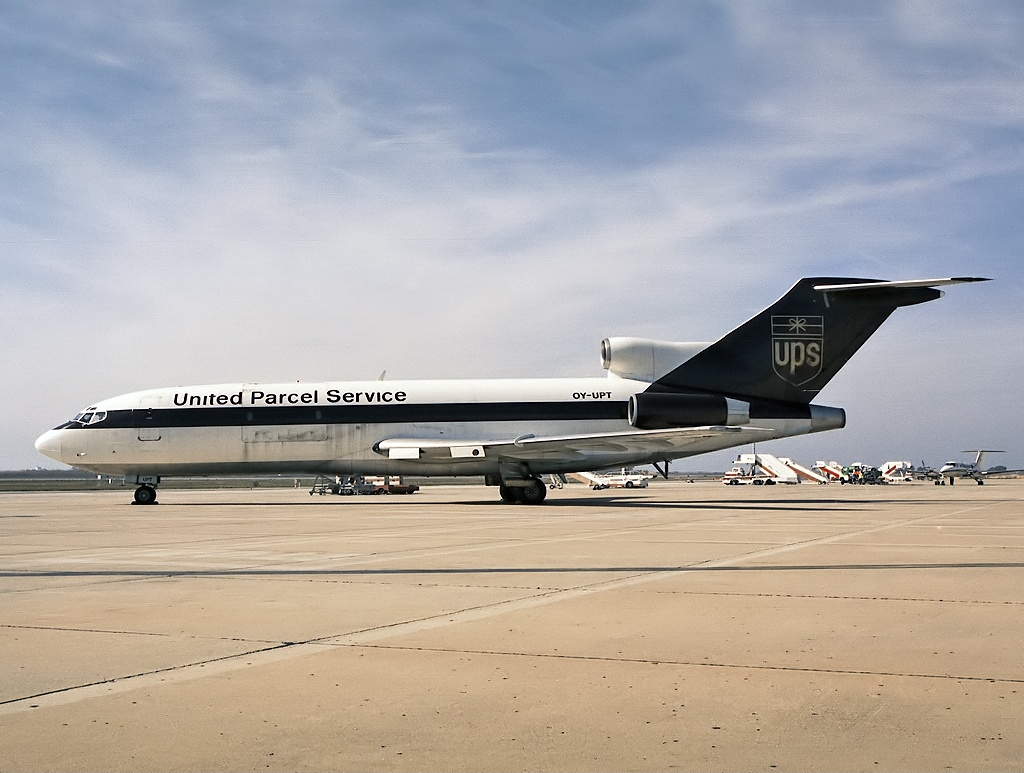
Boeing 727-200 of Star Air at Faro Airport

Maersk established a cargo division, Maersk Air Cargo, in 1982. Due to regulations, it only acted as a ground handling agent for overseas airlines, the largest being Cathay Pacific. When the cargo market was deregulate din 1987, Star Air was established as a separate cargo company directly under the Maersk Group. Incorporated on 1 September 1987, it bought an existing hangar on the south sector of Copenhagen Airport. Three Fokker F-27-600s were leased and converted to combi-freighters. These could be converted from freighter to passenger configuration in half an hour. Star Air originally had a mix of operations. One part was corporate charters, one was wet leasing to other airlines, one was charter and domestic operations for Maersk Air, and finally it conducted European hauls for freight companies, including FedEx, TNT and United Parcel Service (UPS). A Star Air F-27 crashed during landing at Cologne Bonn Airport on 26 May 1988, killing the crew of two.

Although initially profitable, Star Air recorded a loss of DKK 10 million in 1991. To cut costs the operations were transferred to a new legal entity, Star Air I/S, which was then placed under Maersk Air. At the time UPS was looking for a European partner to haul intra-European flights out of Cologne Bonn Airport, using a fleet of Boeing 727s. Star Air missed this contract narrowly to Sterling, an existing 727 operator. However, in 1993 Sterling fell into financial distress and was not able to meet its contractual obligations. UPS turned to Maersk, signing a deal on 22 October 1993. UPS Airlines transferred two of its 727-200s to Maersk and within ten days operations had commenced. This were based at Cologne Bonn Airport and involved flights to Milan, Rome, Zaragoza and Porto.

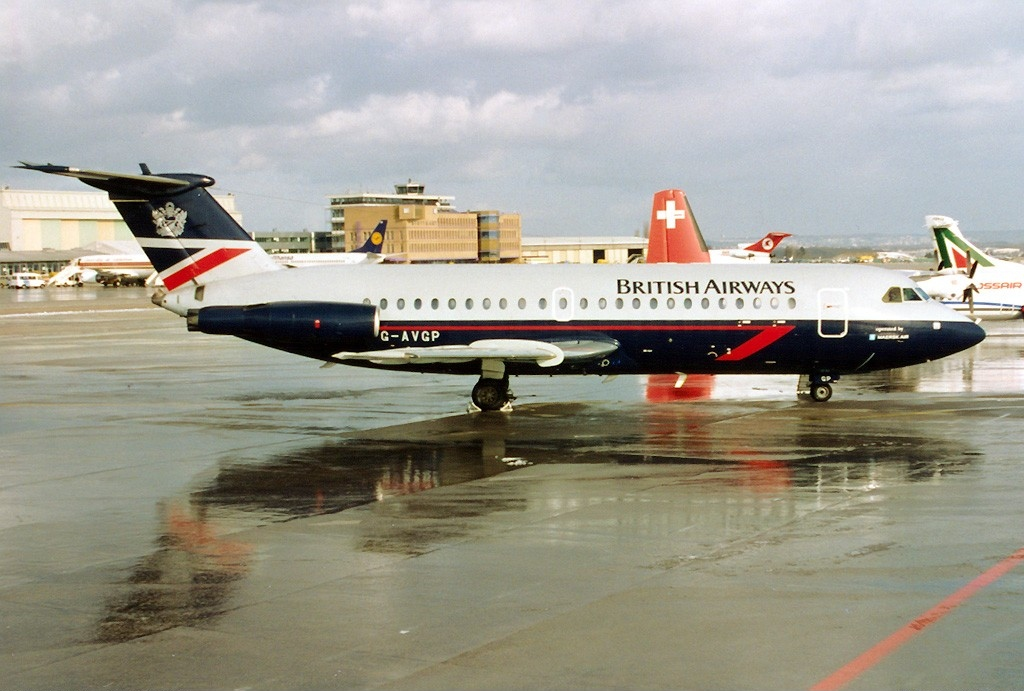
Maersk Air UK BAC 1-11-400 at Stuttgart Airport in 1994 in British Airways livery

With the deregulation approaching, Maersk looked at other markets in which it could operate. Maersk determined that the British market was lucrative. Through its joint venture with British Airways, the Plimsoll Line, it bought Birmingham Executive Airways. The Plimsoll Line had previously bought Plymouth-based Brymon Airways and also owned Plymouth City Airport. The rules at the time hindered Maersk from owning more than fifty percent of the company. Birmingham Executive Airways was of particular interest for Maersk as they held concessions from Birmingham Airport to Copenhagen, Göteborg Landvetter Airport and Milan. This would allow Maersk to establish itself with additional international routes.

To expand its operations, Birmingham Executive Airways changed its name to Birmingham European Airways and replaced its older Jetstream 31 and Grumman Gulfstream I turboprops with four British Aircraft Corporation One-Eleven. By 1991 its revenue had tripled to £56.7 million, although its deficits plummeted eightfold to £11.8 million. The two companies were merged in 1992 and renamed Brymon European Airways. However, the two parts of the airline has vastly different scopes, fleets and strategies and few synergies could be taken advantage of. Maersk and British Airways therefore decided to split up the company. The company was demerged in 1993, with British Airways taking over the former Brymon operations and Maersk taking over the former Birmingham operations. The latter was renamed Maersk Air UK.

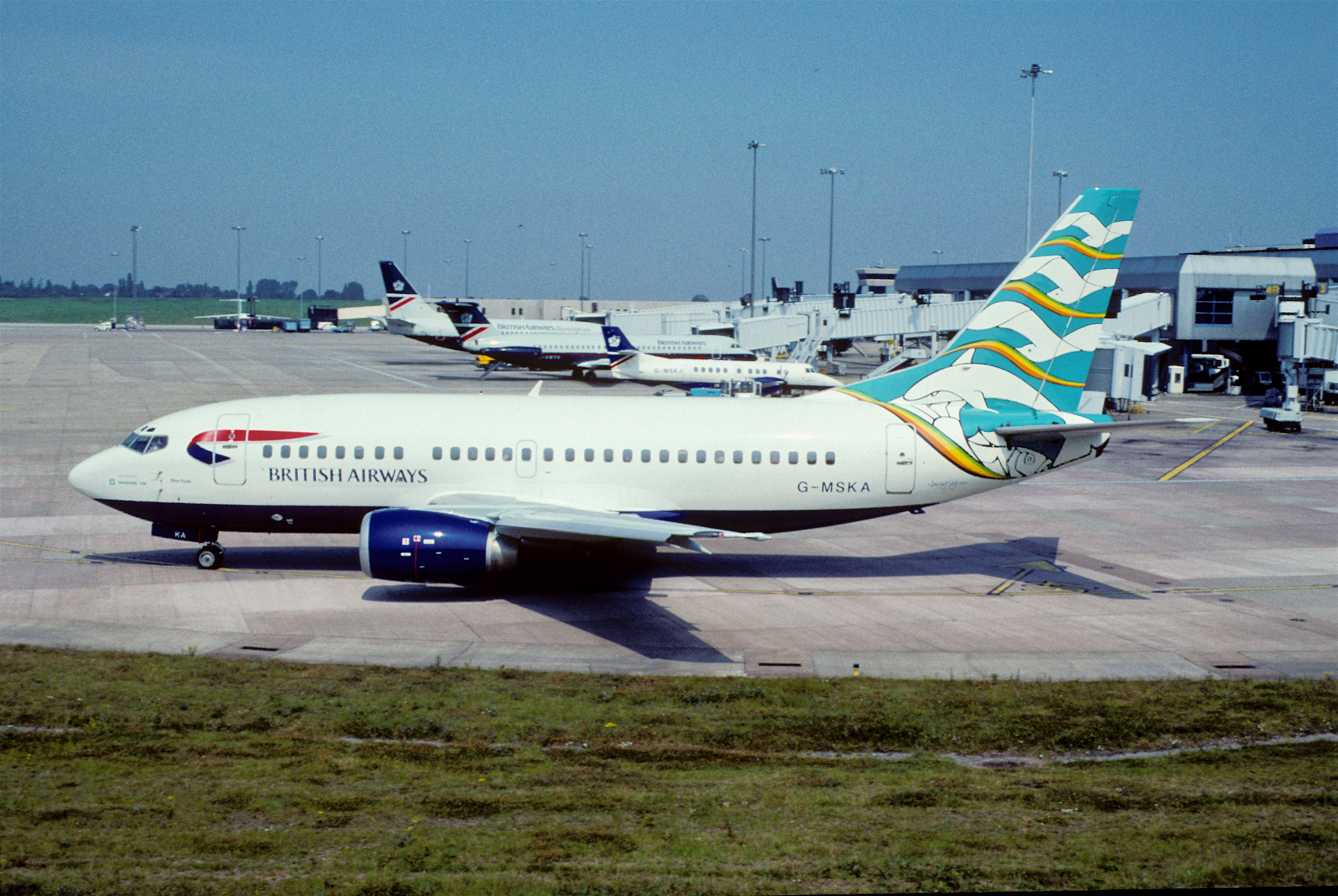
Boeing 737-500 at Birmingham Airport

Maersk signed a franchise agreement in which Maersk Air UK would fly with British Airways livery and flight codes, but at their own expense and their own aircraft and crew. International services were provided out of Birmingham to Amsterdam, Copenhagen, Cork, Dublin, Milan and Stuttgart with the One-Elevens. Domestic services were flown with turboprops to Glasgow, Newcastle-upon-Tyne and Belfast. Patronage rose from 300,000 to 451,000 from 1992 to 1996. The 737-500s were delivered from 1996.

The airline carried out a major overhaul of its fleet in 1996. The four One-Elevens were sold and replaced with newer Boeing 737-500s. Meanwhile, a Jetstream 41 was transferred from British Airways, replacing the smaller Jetstream 31s. The services to Dublin, Cork and Glasgow were terminated and instead a route was started to Lyon.

Maersk Air UK saw its ridership increase with 22 percent in 1997, ending at 550,000 passengers. In November the airline ordered three 50-seat Bombardier CRJ200s with an option for a further twelve of any combination of the CRJ200 and the larger 70-seat CRJ700. The first CRJs were delivered in 1998 and by August 1999 there were six such aircraft in the fleet. The One-Eleves were retired in 1998 and the Jetstream 41 was pulled from service the following year.

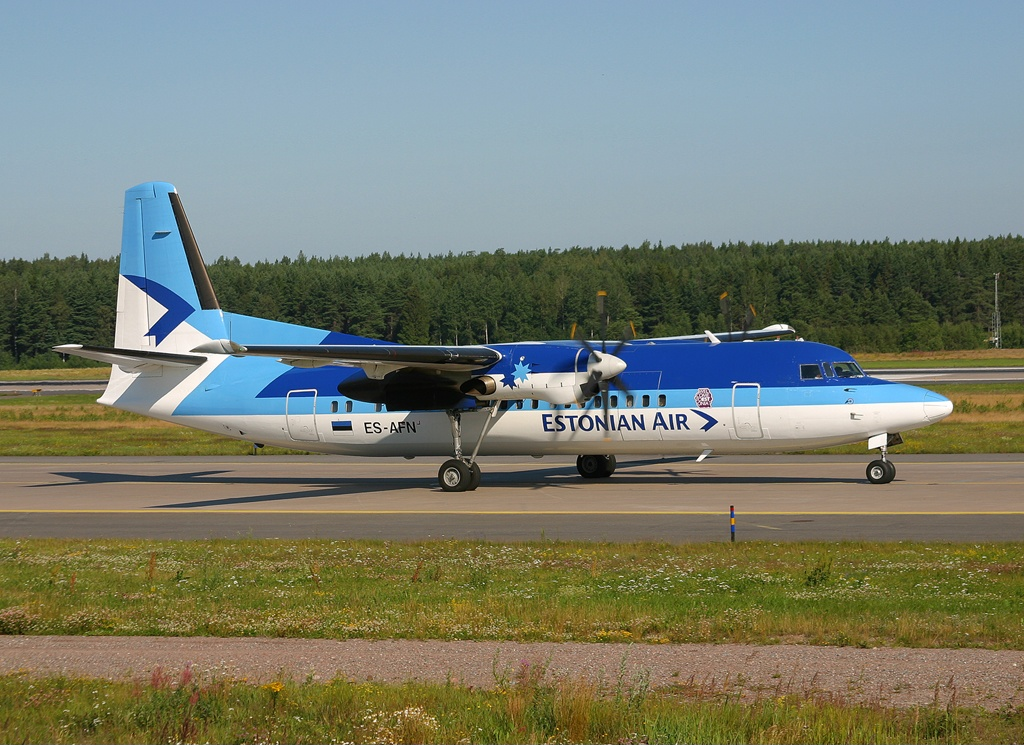
A Fokker 50 of Estonian Air in 2002 at Stockholm Arlanda Airport

Both Maersk Air and SAS bid for a stake in Estonian Air when it was privatized in 1996. Despite issuing a lower bid, Maersk won, claiming a 49-percent stake along with a 17-percent state issued to Baltic Cresco Investment Group. Combined these cost about DKK 100 million. Estonian Air underwent a modernization through the acquisition of Western aircraft. Two of Maersk Air's Fokker 50s were leased to Estonian Air, who also took delivery of two 737-500s. A third -500 was leased from Maersk from September 1998.

== Danish deregulation ==
Maersk Air commenced services from Billund to Frankfurt in 1993, and a year later it started flights from Copenhagen to Kristiansand. To meet the upcoming deregulation, Maersk carried out a major fleet rearrangement in 1993. The airline sold its Fokker 50s and leased them back. Meanwhile, it procured six Boeing 737-500s, which were delivered in 1996. It also ordered twelve new Boeing 737-700s, which were delivered from March 1998.

By the early 1990s the cooperation between the three Danair airlines had dissipated. One issue was that SAS launched its frequent flyer program EuroBonus in 1992. This was extended to also cover Cimber's domestic services, but Maersk chose to not participate. The Danair partnership was therefore abolished and from then each of the airlines flew each their respective routes without cooperation. Danair was dissolved on 1 October 1995, when the domestic airline industry in Denmark was deregulated.

With the demise of Daniar, Maersk Air focused on improving its international connections. Its primary strategy was to establish routes from Billund to European destinations with codeshare agreements with major European airlines. This would allow Maersk Air's customers access to continue onwards with these airlines. Such agreements were struck with Air France, British Airways, Finnair, KLM, Lufthansa, Sabena and Swissair. Gradually the services were upgraded from Fokker 50 to 737-500s. In 1995 Maersk opened flights from Billund to Paris-Charles de Gaulle Airport and the following year to Amsterdam and Stockholm.

Maersk Air I/S was reorganized in 1996. The partnership model was abandoned and instead the airline became a limited company (aktieselskab) directly under the mother company. Star Air on its side became a subsidiary of Maersk Air. Maersk Travel was merged with DFDS Travel in 1997, to create Maersk DFDS Travel. This proved a difficult process and Maersk pulled out of the new company in 1999.

In 1994 Maersk Air bought out the other owners of Copenhagen Air Services. Within three years it was making a DKK 46-million profit from a DKK 401-million revenue. In 1998 Maersk merged the company with the ground handling company owned by the Swedish Civil Aviation Administration, creating Novia. It operated ground handling services at the airports in Copenhagen, Stockholm-Arlanda and Gothenburg Landvetter.

Maersk's success in Jutland was noticed by SAS, who in October 1996 opened its first service out of Billund, to Frankfurt. This was the first route in which the two airlines competed head to head. In response, Maersk Air commenced services the following year out of SAS' stronghold at Copenhagen Airport to Milan, Geneva and Stockholm. The latter was part of the "golden triangle"—consisting of the three highly profitable routes between the Scandinavian capitals. This was met by reduced prices by SAS on the route, to keep its goal of an eighty-percent market share.

Maersk also established a feeder service from Aalborg to Billund, to provide connecting flights to international destinations. In 1997 services from Billund to Bergen, Milan, Nice and Zürich. Flemming Knudsen took the position as CEO on 12 January 1998. On 3 March the first 737-700 was delivered, with Maersk Air being the European launch customer. Ole Dietz replaced Knudsen on 1 March 1999.

With its eight daily round trips, Maersk Air only captured ten percent of the market on the Copenhagen–Stockholm route, losing money on it. Maersk therefore started negotiations with British Airways and KLM to see if they could become part of an airline alliance. They were in close negotiations with what would become Oneworld, but pulled out in the last minute. There were two main concerns: the first was that Maersk would have to become a franchise partner of British Airways, and that they had already started negotiating with SAS.

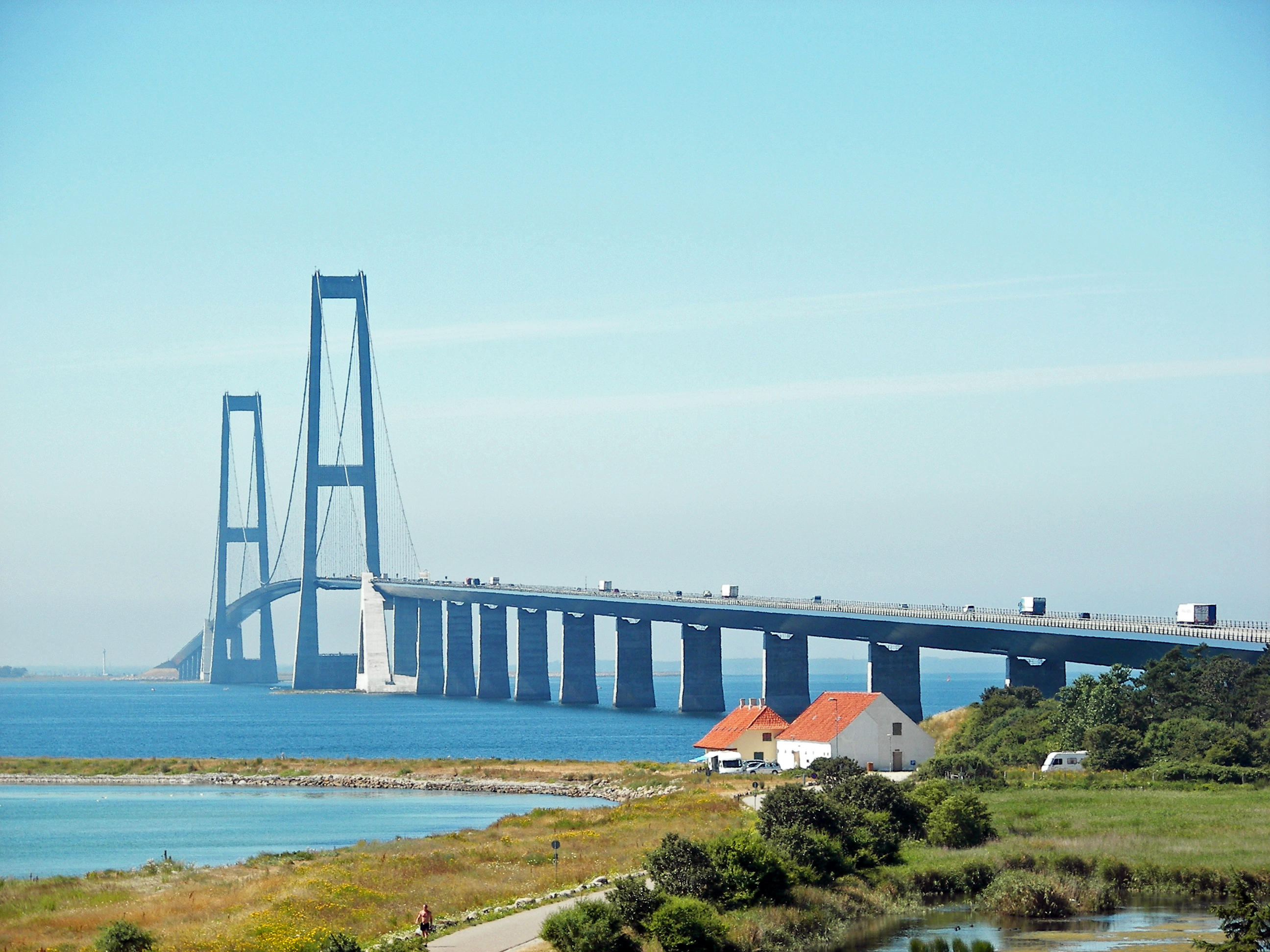
The Great Belt Fixed Link had a marked negative impact on ridership on domestic routes in Denmark after it opened in 1998

With the 14 June 1998 opening of the Great Belt Fixed Link, car, coach and rail transport became faster between Jutland and Funen on the one hand, and Zealand on the other. Without the need to take the Great Belt ferries, travel time was cut by an hour. For instance the travel time by train from Aarhus to Copenhagen fell from four to three hours, making domestic flights considerably less competitive. This had its effect on patronage, with significant drop in domestic traffic.

The same year the government introduced a tax of DKK 150 on all domestic flights, which further contributed to the fall in domestic ridership. The shortest route, from Odense to Copenhagen, was the most severely affected. Maersk Air anticipated a significant drop and reduced services from a 737-500 to a Fokker 50. Passenger numbers dropped to a third and the service was terminated on 13 June 1998.

== Cartel case ==
For Maersk the lack of a frequent-flyer program was becoming a major hindrance on routes where it competed with SAS. With EuroBonus, SAS was able to get business travelers to buy more expensive tickets or wait longer at airports so they could earn personal miles, at the expense of their employer, who was paying the ticket. Maersk introduced a bonus program which gave free trips to the business, rather than the traveler, but this was not successful at attracting travelers.

After the Oneworld negotiations failed, Maersk Air turned to SAS in an attempt to initiate a cooperation. Negotiations commenced in early 1997, and the deal was announced on 8 October 1998, taking effect 28 March 1999. Maersk would adopt EuroBonus and codeshare all domestic flights, all international flights out of Copenhagen and the routes from Billund to London and Nice. Maersk also commenced services from Copenhagen to Athens and Venice.

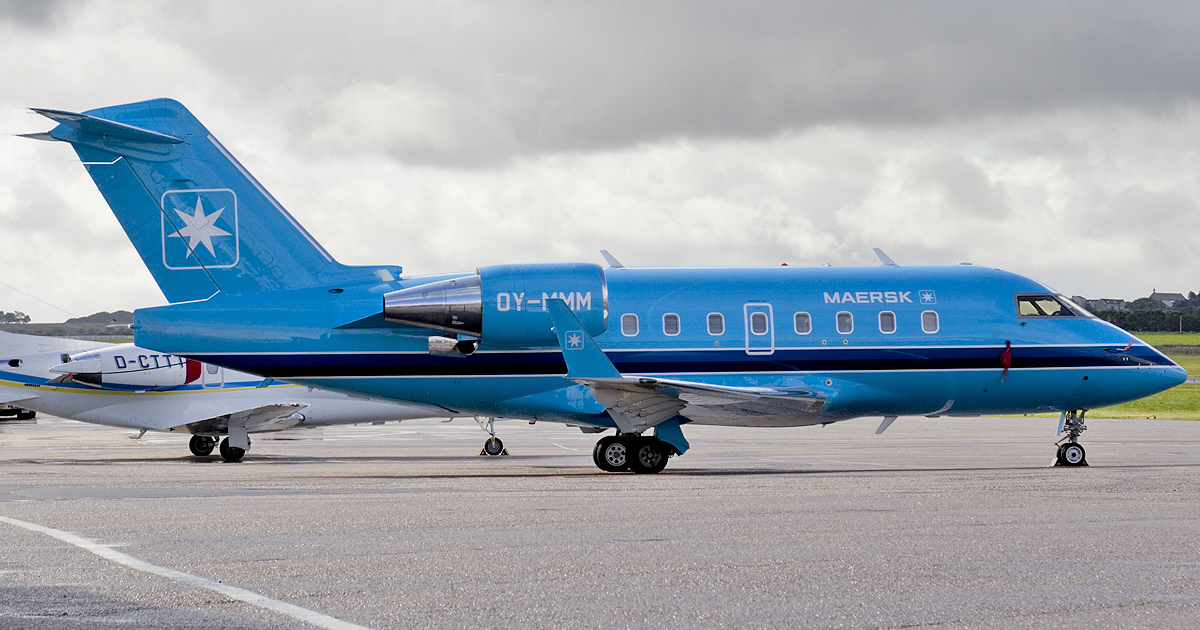
With the Maersk Group's 2005 sale of Maersk Air, Star Air took over the operations of the Bombardier Challenger 600 corporate jet

In addition to the publicly stated clauses, the agreement also contained a series of illegal collusions. Maersk and SAS split up the market between them, so they no longer would fly on competing routes. This involved that Maersk Air would withdraw from its Copenhagen services to Stockholm and Geneva. Maersk Air also agreed to—gradually so to not awake suspicion—withdraw from its various codeshare agreements with other airlines than SAS.

One reason for SAS' move was that Norway's Braathens had recently bought Transwede and that negotiations had commenced with the aim of a merger or close cooperation with Maersk. Such a cooperation could seriously threaten SAS in the domestic and intra-Scandinavian market, and by holding Maersk close at bay SAS hoped to avoid such an alliance.

Maersk Air announced in November 1998 that it would close the two routes it was losing money on, the Copenhagen services to Vojens and Stockholm. On the former the route had lost sixty percent of its patronage with the opening of the Great Belt Fixed Link. Meanwhile, SAS pulled out of the Billund–Frankfurt route. Niels Sundberg, CEO of Sun-Air, wrote an official complaint to the EU Commission, arguing that the deal struck between SAS and Maersk had a closer cooperation than the competition regulations allowed.

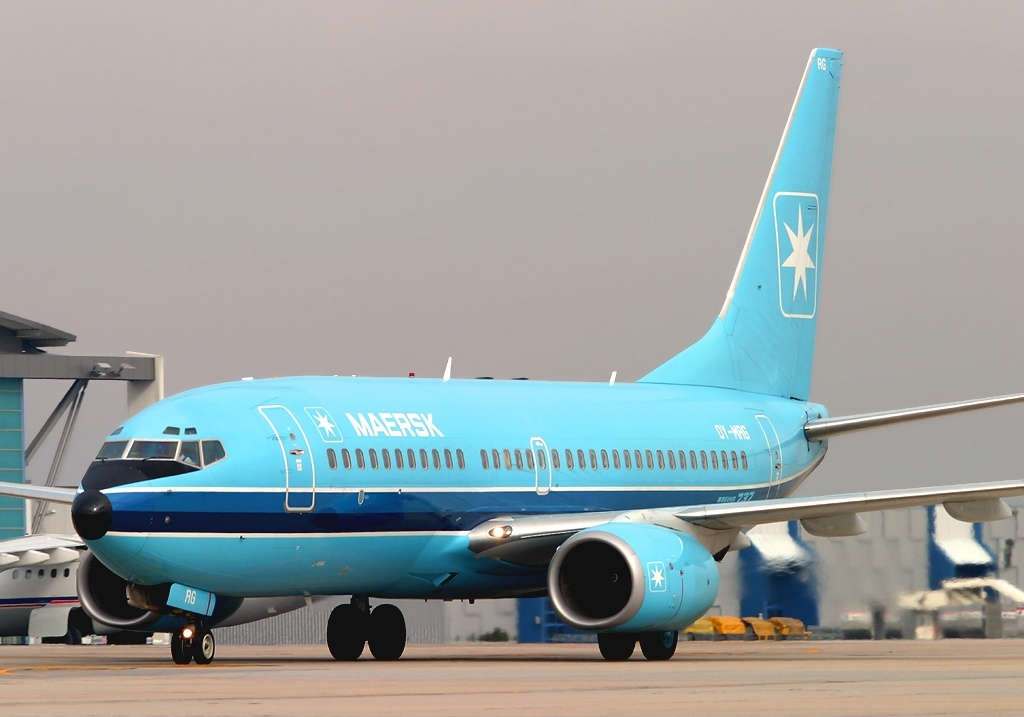
737-700 at Stuttgart Airport 2004

The case was followed up by the EU Commission and the Danish authorities. Eventually the European Commissioner for Competition, Mario Monti, approved a dawn raid on SAS and Maersk, which took place on 15 June 2000. Maersk Air chose to cooperate with the Commission and surrendered a series of private papers not found in the raid, in a hope that this would lower a potential fine. These summarized the negotiations and documented how the airlines had discussed abolishing all competing services. The commission issued a statement of objections in January 2001. It concluded among other things that SAS would make an additional €20-million profit per year if Maersk pulled out of the Copenhagen–Stockholm route.

Maersk Air was sentenced to a fine of €17.5 million, while SAS was fined €43.75 million. Maersk Air was granted a twenty-five-percent discount for cooperation, while SAS received a ten-percent discount. As a consequence, Dietz resigned as CEO and Hansen, who had been appointed chairman, also withdrew. Flemming Ipsen was hired as a new CEO, while Troels Dilling was hired as chairman. Ipsen came from A. P. Møller–Mærsk's corporate judicial division, and had no experience from the aviation industry.

== Decline ==
Maersk was struck by a series of labor disputes in 1998 and 1999. The company experienced high turnover amongst cabin crew, due to lower wages and longer working hours that at SAS. The airline was therefore forced to hire English-speaking crews. However, these were limited to one per flight. The airline had a revenue of DKK 3.5 billion and made a profit of DKK 124 million in 2000. That year the airline opened a route from Billund to Dublin.

With the deregulation of the handling market from 1999, competitors with lower costs took over a substantial portion of the market. Novia failed to retain its profits and lost DKK 80 million from 1999 to 2001. The CAA sold its stake in 2001 to Aviapartner, with Maersk weaving its right of first refusal. The cooperation between the two owners was poor. Maersk Air tried to either sell their stake to Aviapartner or by the other half, but in the end the two companies were not even able to speak together. Novia continued to lose money and had to receive DKK 65 million in new share capital in 2001. Maersk Air eventually let the company be file for bankruptcy. The cargo handling was sold to SAS in 2003, while the remaining assets were sold for DKK 1.

At the turn of the century Maersk Air fell into financial distress. The airline was struck hard by the 2001 airline recession, making a loss that year of DKK 341 million. Ridership increased in 2002, largely through the increased sale of discounted tickets. The services to Istanbul, Dublin, Zürich and Milan were closed in 2002, as were the Copenhagen-bound flights from Rønne and Billund. However, Munich and Barcelona were added to the schedules.

Maersk Air therefore turned to divest its non-core activities. The hangar that was used by Cargo Center Copenhagen was sold for DKK 80 million. Estonian Air had grown to a fleet of four 737-500 and was making a profit with eleven international destinations. However, Maersk saw little strategic value in the airline and the 49-percent stake was therefore sold to SAS in late 2003 for DKK 146 million.

With the increased losses, the Maersk Group invested a further DKK 300 million in a share capital expansion in June 2003. Meanwhile, the airline carried out cuts, laying off 40 pilots and 120 cabin crew. This was not sufficient, and in November a further DKK 400 was placed in the company by the owners. To avoid the situation from deteriorating, Maersk Air was tightly integrated into the owner corporation and had to make detailed monthly reports. In late 2003 Maersk Aircraft A/S was established to own the fleet, spurring speculation in the media that Maersk was planning of liquidating the company. The year gave a net loss of DKK 841 million.

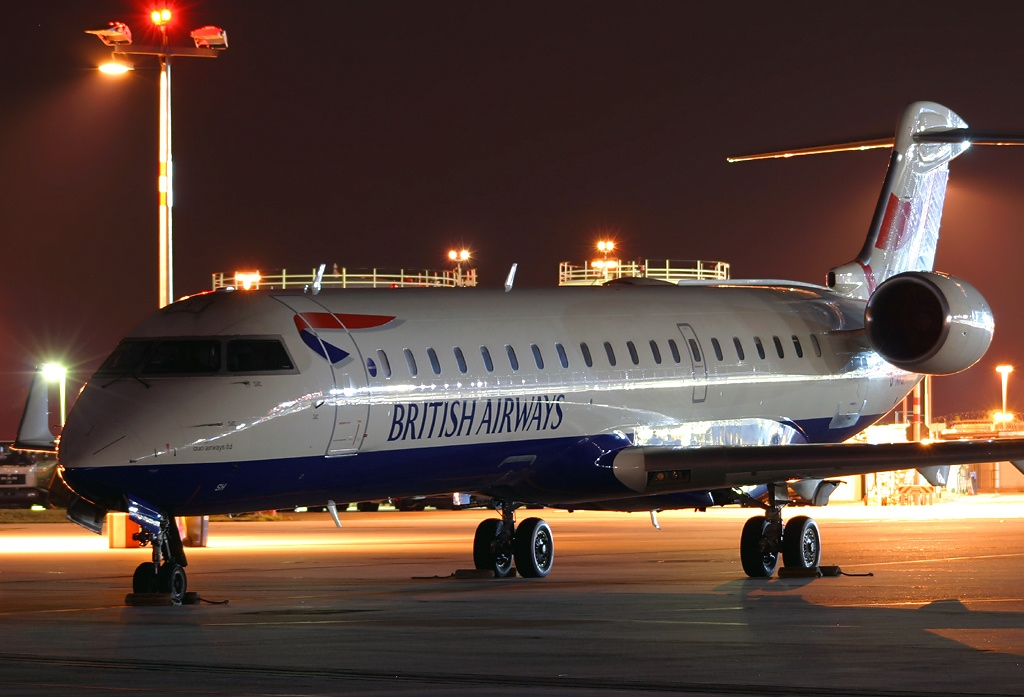
CRJ700 of Duo Airways in 2003

By 2001 the number of employees in Maersk Air UK had risen to 490 and the first CRJ700 had been delivered. Meanwhile, British Airways was building up operations at Birmingham Airport through two other franchise agreements, with Brymond Airways and British Regional Airlines. The franchise agreement with Maersk, set to expire on 24 March 2001, was extended that month through the summer season. This spurred speculation that Maersk would abandon the franchising agreement. However, in August a five-year extension was signed.

Maersk Air UK lost an accumulative DKK 325 million from 2000 through 2002. By early 2003 the Maersk Group had given up on operating an airline in the UK and put Maersk Air UK up for sale. However, there were no interested buyers and it was speculated that British Airways would have to step in and take over the franchise. The company was therefore sold in a management buyout in 2003, with the airline becoming Duo Airways. At the time the airline had eight aircraft and 350 employees. Up till this point Maersk Air had lost DKK 250 million on its UK operations. The new company folded in 2004, and Maersk Air was forced to bring home five CRJs from Birmingham. Maersk lost a further DKK 65 million with the sale of these aircraft.

== Fly as you like ==
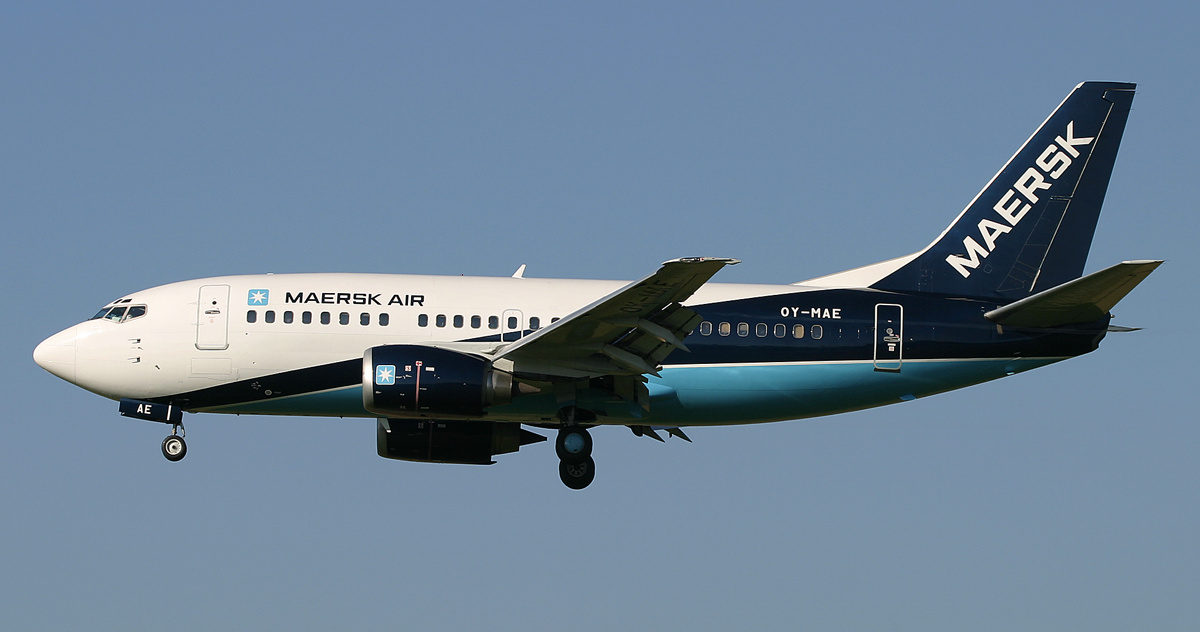
Boeing 737-500 in 2004

In the years following the cartel case, almost the entire executive management of the airline was replaced. A large portion of the new management was without experience from the aviation industry. On 1 November 2003 Ipsen was replaced as CEO by Finn Øelund, who came from the same position in Air Greenland. He devised a new strategy, in which the airline would better utilize tis fleet by placing flights closer to each other and flying throughout the day. He also proposed competing head on with SAS, as he believed that Maersk Air with the new strategy could operate with lower costs than the consortium.

The plans materialized in 2004 with the establishment of routes from Billund to Milan, Oslo and Kristiansand. The airline entered a codesharing agreement with Kenya Airways, allowing passengers to fly from Billund via Amsterdam to Nairobi and onwards to 26 African destinations. A new reservation system was introduced allowing passengers to pick their seat upon booking and opt for additional seat pitch. The aircraft received a new seating plan, whereby four different classes were introduced, named "small", "medium", "large" and "x-large", with pitches ranging from 70 to 90 centimeters (28 to 35 in) and from six to four abreast. Each aircraft would increase its annual flight time from 2,200 to 3,600 hours, allowing for more routes to be flown with the same fleet. Combined, this allowed for a significant drop in the airline's unit costs.

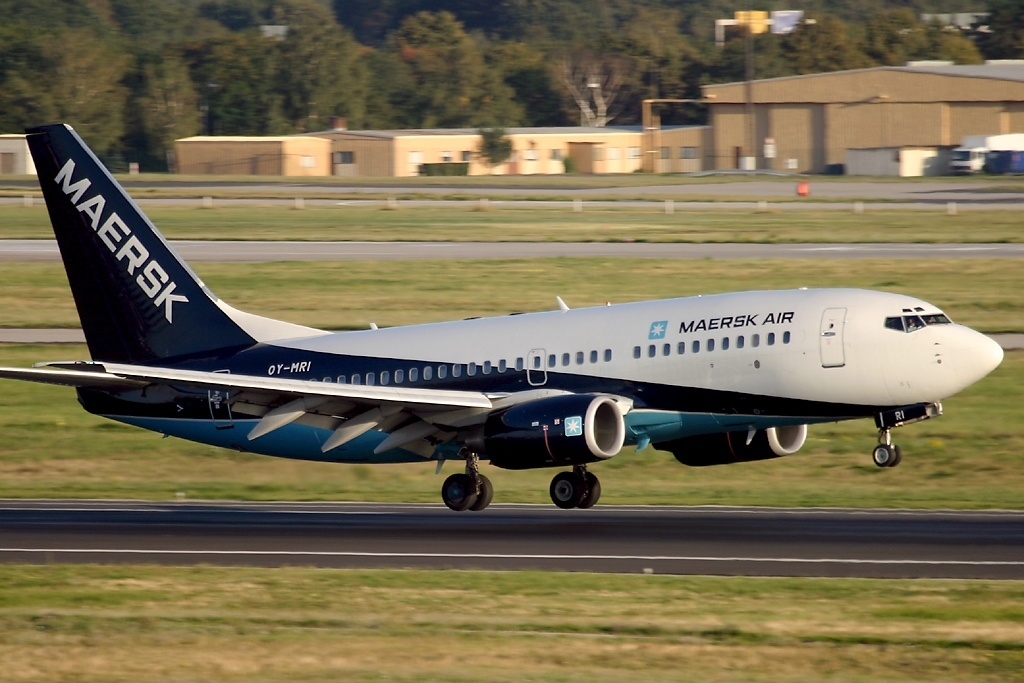
Maersk 737-700 in the "fly as you like" livery

A name change to Maersk Air Express was considered, but dropped to ensure continuity. But the change in strategy was reflected through a change to the airline's visual profile. Aircraft received a new white and dark blue livery, replacing the old light-blue Maersk colors. The airline adopted the slogan "fly as you like" and focused its route production on typical holiday destinations and cheap fares. The airline focused on having a uniform fleet of 737-500 and -700s. It therefore sold its CRJs to Cimber, who took over the routes from Billund to Aalborg, Brusseels, Milan, Munich, Oslo and Stockholm.

The four-class system was complicated for passengers and by late 2004 it was reduced to three. However, sales increased by 34 percent, reaching 2.7 million that year. The airline continued to lose money and in December 2004 a further DKK 400 million in share capital was provided by the owner. A deal was also struck with Star Tour to wet lease six of the aircraft for inclusive tour charters. The year ended with a deficit of DKK 499 million. Contributing causes were rising fuel costs, selling more discounted tickets than planned and a weak dollar, which influenced the books as the Maersk Group adjusted its fleet book values to the annual dollar rate.

== Merger with Sterling ==
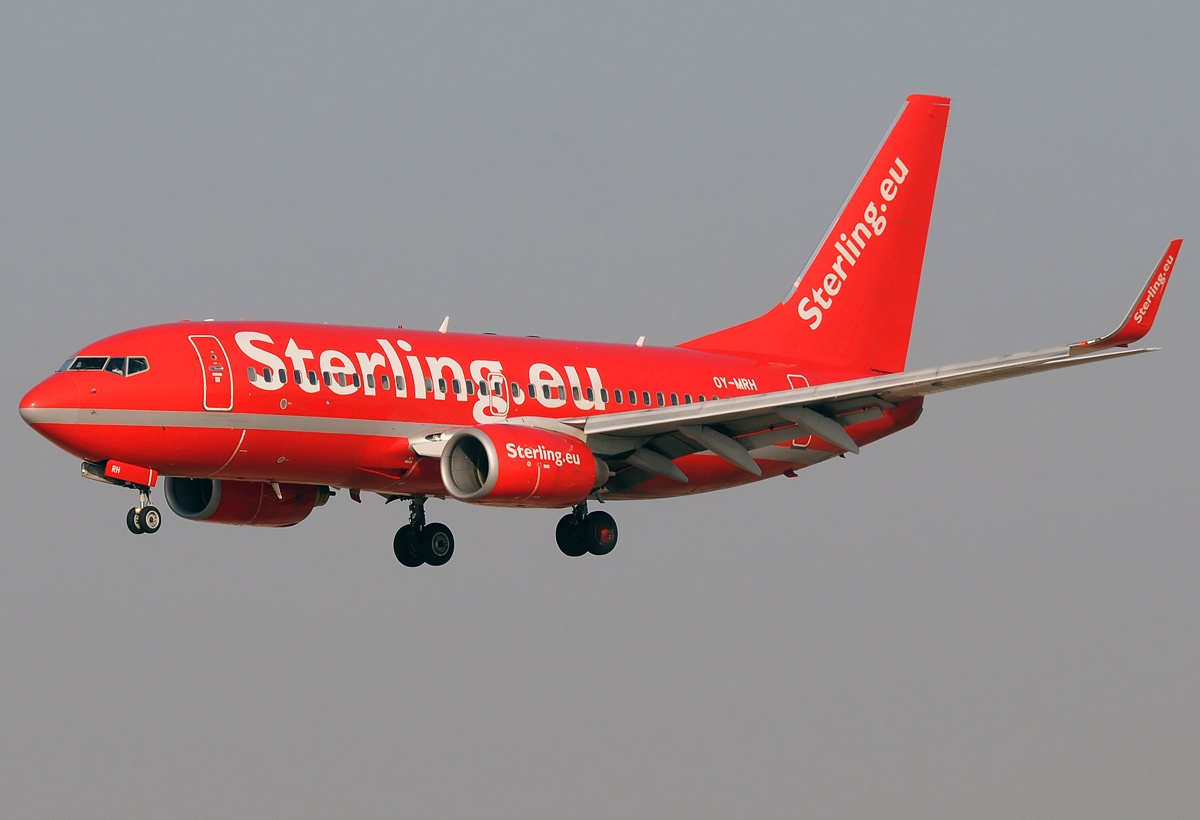
Ex-Maersk 737-700 with Sterling Airlines

Since 2002 Maersk had seen competition in the scheduled market from Sterling, which had reorganized itself as a low-cost carrier targeting the Mediterranean leisure market. In 2005 Fred. Olsen & Co. sold the airline to FL Group, an Icelandic holding group which also owned among others Icelandair. The Maersk Group announced on 30 June 2005 that it would sell Maersk Air to Sterling. Star Air and the corporate jet were kept out of the deal. Ownership of the 737 was also not included, and instead there were leased to Sterling. The sales price of Maersk Air was never made public.

The new airline, which took the Sterling name, had a fleet of 30 737s and 1,900 employees upon its merger in September 2005. One hundred and eighty of these were laid off. It was at the time the fourth-largest low-cost carrier in Europe. The leasing agreements proved unfavorable and Maersk Aircraft needed an additional DKK 300 million in share capital in 2005. Maersk Air pilots were met with lower wages and reduced seniority, having to accept the wage level of Sterling. Five of Maersk's routes were terminated and the flight slots reallocated to other Scandinavian markets. The new company sold Maersk Air Cargo to SAS on 1 October 2005.

Despite a steady growth in the number of routes, revenue and passengers, Sterling Airlines failed to make a profit. The airline was taken over by partial owner Pálmi Haraldsson. He had to issue new share capital of DKK 444 million in 2008. However, the 2008–11 Icelandic financial crisis created liquidity problems and attempts were made to sell the airline. These failed and on 29 October 2008 Sterling filed for bankruptcy. The main competitors, SAS, Norwegian Air Shuttle and Transavia Denmark, all rushed to establish services on the terminated routes. By the time parts of the estate had been bought by Cimber on 3 December, most of the lucrative slots and routes had been captured.

== Bibliography ==
- Ellemose, Søren (2009). Luftens helte (in Danish). Aarhus: Jyllands-Posten Forlag. ISBN 978-87-7692-197-2.
