= Janni Spies =

Danish businesswoman

- Born: Janni Isager Brodersen; 19 September 1962 (age 63); Herlev, Denmark
- Other names: Janni Spies-Kjær, Janni Kjær
- Known for: Spies Rejser
- Spouses: Simon Spies (1983–1984, his death); Christian Kjær (1988–2008, divorced)
- Children: 2

Janni Spies (née Brodersen, born 19 September 1962) is a Danish businesswoman, multimillionaire, and former owner of the Scandinavian travelling empire Spies Rejser including the charter airline Conair of Scandinavia, companies she inherited from her first husband Simon Spies. Formerly one of Denmark's five richest and the 10th wealthiest woman in Europe, Spies today is chairwoman for Simon Spies Fonden (The Simon Spies Foundation).

== Biography ==
Spies was born Janni Isager Brodersen on 19 September 1962 to Yvonne Brodersen (1929–2007) and Werner Heinrich Isager (1922–2011) in the Copenhagen suburb Herlev. Her mother was a seamstress and homemaker, and her father was a telephone technician. When in tenth grade, Janni at age 16 dropped out of school and started working as a messenger girl at the travelling agency Spies Rejser. She caught the attention of the company owner, Simon Spies, and the then 20-year-old Janni married the 61-year-old Simon Spies on 11 May 1983 in Holmen Church in central Copenhagen. To their wedding 3.000 guests were invited. Simon Spies died less than a year later on 16 April 1984, and bequeathed the majority of his estate to his wife, making her one of Europe's richest women.

Spies became chairwoman of the board upon her husband's death, and in 1989 acquired the travelling agency Tjæreborg Rejser. Spies sold the entire company in 1996 to what is now Sunclass Airlines.

She has later been accused of having destroyed her inheritance by bringing her brother, a former toolmaker, Leif Brodersen on the board together with a friend of his, the former trade union economist Steffen Møller. Her board now counseled her to purchase three Airbus A300 in 1987 and in 1991 another six brand new and very expensive Airbus A320. As the Airbus A300 were very difficult to sell, the passengers became fewer due to the Gulf War the entire Spies company ended up in severe financial difficulties. According to the General Manager at the time, Knud Heinesen, had this never happened if Janni had listened to him instead, and merged or cooperated with Copenhagen-based Sterling Airways instead. Also her second husband, the lawyer and politician Christian Kjær agreed. And as he took over as chairman of the board, (with Janni as vice chairwoman only) Leif Brodersen left the Spies company. But the financial problems didn't end there, and in 1993 had several banks to add new capital to the bankruptcy threatened travelling agency. And in 1996 was Spies Rejser sold to the British travel company Airtours while Conair merged with Scanair into Premiair, changing the name to Thomas Cook Airlines Scandinavia, which today is Sunclass Airlines A/S.

Spies is chairwoman for Simon Spies Fonden (The Simon Spies Foundation) that supports science, business, arts, and sport, and typically donates some 2-3 million DKK every year.

In 2007, Spies was made a Dame of the Order of the Dannebrog.

== Private life ==
From 1985 to 1987, Spies dated and was engaged to Swedish actor and director Gunnar Hellström (1928–2001). She dated estate agent Jan Fog for a short while, before marrying Christian Kjær in 1988. The marriage produced two children but ended in divorce in 2008, followed by bitter court cases.
