= VKG =

VKG may refer to:

- Viru Keemia Grupp, a chemical company
- Vampire Knight, an anime
- NSW Police, The New South Wales Police Force radio call sign known as VKG
- Thomas Cook Airlines Scandinavia, ICAO
- SunClass Airlines, ICAO
- Rạch Giá Airport, IATA
