= List of Airbus A310 operators =

A list of orders, deliveries, and current and previous operators of the Airbus A310 as of September 2024

Airline	Orders	Deliveries	In operation
Government, Executive, and Private			20
Aeroflot	5	5	
Aerolineas Argentinas		5	
Aerocancun	2	2	
Air Afrique	4	4	
Air Algérie	2	2	
Air Atlanta Icelandic		2	
Air Bagan		2	
Air Djibouti		1	
Air France	11	11	
Air India	8	8	
Air Kazakhstan	8	8	
Air Liberté		3	
Air Maldives		3	
Air Malta		2	
Air Niugini	2	2	
Air Paradise International		1	
Air Plus Comet		9	
Air Transat			
Alyemda		1	
Ariana Afghan Airlines		3	3
Armenian Airlines		1	
Aryan Cargo Express		2	
Austrian Airlines	4	4	
AVA Airlines		1	1
Aviajet		1	
Balair	4	4	
Biman Bangladesh Airlines		6	
British Caledonian	2	2	
CAAC	5	5	
Canada 3000		4	
Canadian Airlines		12	
China Eastern Airlines		5	
China Northwest Airlines		3	
Condor Airlines	5	5	
Corsair		1	
Cyprus Airways	4	4	
Cyprus Turkish Airlines	4	4	
Czech Airlines	2	2	
Deccan 360		3	
Delta Air Lines	9	9	
Diamond Sakha Airlines		3	
Ecuatoriana	2	2	
Emirates	8	8	
Etihad Cargo		1	
FedEx Express		12	
Flynas		1	
Hapag Lloyd Flug	7	7	
Heliopolis Airlines		1	
Hi Fly		2	
ILFC	7	7	
Interflug	3	3	
Islandsflug		3	
Iran Air		9	1
Iran Airtour		4	4
Jes Air		3	
Jordan Aviation	1	1	
Kenya Airways	2	2	
KLM	10	10	
Kuwait Airways	11	11	
Libyan Airlines		3	
Lloyd Aereo Boliviano		4	
Lufthansa	20	20	
Mahan Air		15	
Malaysia Airlines		1	
Martinair	2	2	
MIAT Mongolian Airlines		1	
Middle East Airlines	10	10	
Midwest Airlines		2	
Nepal Airlines		1	
Nigeria Airways	4	4	
Nigerian Global Aviation	1	1	
Novespace		1	
OASIS Airlines	2	2	
Oman Air		6	
Pakistan International Airlines	6	12	
Pan Am	18	18	
Passaredo		2	
P.C. Air		1	
Qatar Airways		3	
Region Air		4	
Royal Aviation		4	
Royal Jordanian	7	7	
Sabena	3	3	
SAETA		2	
Saga Airlines		2	
Sakha Avia		3	
Saudia Cargo		1	
Services Air		3	
Shaheen Air International		1	
Shiv Air		1	
Southern Aircraft Consultancy		3	
SilkAir		2	
Singapore Airlines	23	23	
Somali Airlines	1	1	
Sudan Airways	1	1	
Swissair	9	9	
S7 Airlines		9	
Taban Air		1	
TAP Portugal	5	5	
TAROM	3	3	
Tehran Airline		1	
Thai Airways Company	2	2	
Thai Airways	2	2	
Toos Airline	2	2	
Transaero		1	
Transavia		1	
Trans European Airways	1	1	
Trans Mediterranean Airways	1	1	
Turkish Cargo	14	14	
ULS Airlines Cargo		3	3
Uzbekistan Airways	1	1	
Vietnam Airlines		2	
Wardair	12	12	
Yazd Airways		2	
Yemenia	2	2	
Totals	252	310	36
