= Simon Spies =

Danish businessman (1921–1984)

- Born: Simon Ove Christian Ogilvie Spies; 1 September 1921; Helsingør, Denmark
- Died: 16 April 1984 (aged 62); Rungsted, Denmark
- Resting place: Hørsholm Cemetery
- Occupation: Businessman
- Known for: Founder of Spies Rejser and Conair of Scandinavia
- Spouse(s): Janni Brodersen (m. 1983–1984; his death)

Simon Ove Christian Ogilvie Spies (1 September 1921 – 16 April 1984) was a Danish tycoon, best known for founding the charter airline Spies Rejser, and its airway company Conair of Scandinavia, and for his flamboyant lifestyle and womanising, including the procurement of sexual services from young women, the morgenbolledamer.

== Biography ==
Simon Ove Christian Ogilvie Spies was born in 1921 and grew up in Helsingør, Denmark. An early business, a bicycle taxi service, failed; a move to Austria, then occupied by Germany, saw him briefly joining the Nazi Party, a decision that cast a shadow over the rest of his life. After working as a tour guide, Spies opened Spies Rejser in 1956, which become a huge success. In the beginning they arranged cheap bus/boattrips to Mallorca, but later in 1965, Spies bought the bankrupt Conair airline and offered cheap package holiday flights to the Danish people.

Simon Spies was known for his provocative views and flamboyant lifestyle. He was famous for employing at his private residence so-called morgenbolledamer, or morning fuck ladies / morning bun ladies, using the pun that "bolle" means both "fuck" and "bun". In 2022, the documentary series Spies og morgenbolledamerne (Spies and the Morning Bun Ladies) by Danish public broadcaster DR detailed the treatment of the morgenbolledamer by Spies, based on the testimonies of former employees and his close friends. It alleged that Spies paid for sexual services from the girls, most of whom were between the ages of 15 and 18, and that if they refused to have sex with him, or if they grew too old, then they were replaced. It also stated that he carried out physical violence against them, paying tens of thousands of kroner to them in exchange for being allowed to beat them or break their arms. This documentary has since come under heavy fire by journalists and commentators as it was revealed in investigation that the producers paid participants and provided one alcoholic participant with vodka to perform. Several claims, including one pertaining to Spies supposedly wanting to break the bones of young girls in return for payment, remain undocumented.

On 11 May 1983, he married 20-year-old Janni Brodersen, who inherited his companies when he died less than a year later on 16 April 1984. In 2013, a movie about his career, Spies & Glistrup by Christoffer Boe, was released; it was described by Glistrup's daughter Anne-Marie Glistrup as "the movie is pure fiction".

== See also ==
- Mogens Glistrup, friend of Spies and a Danish politician, founder of the Progress Party
- Jurij Moskvitin, friend and author of a biography about Spies
