= Aerostan =

Kyrgyz cargo airline

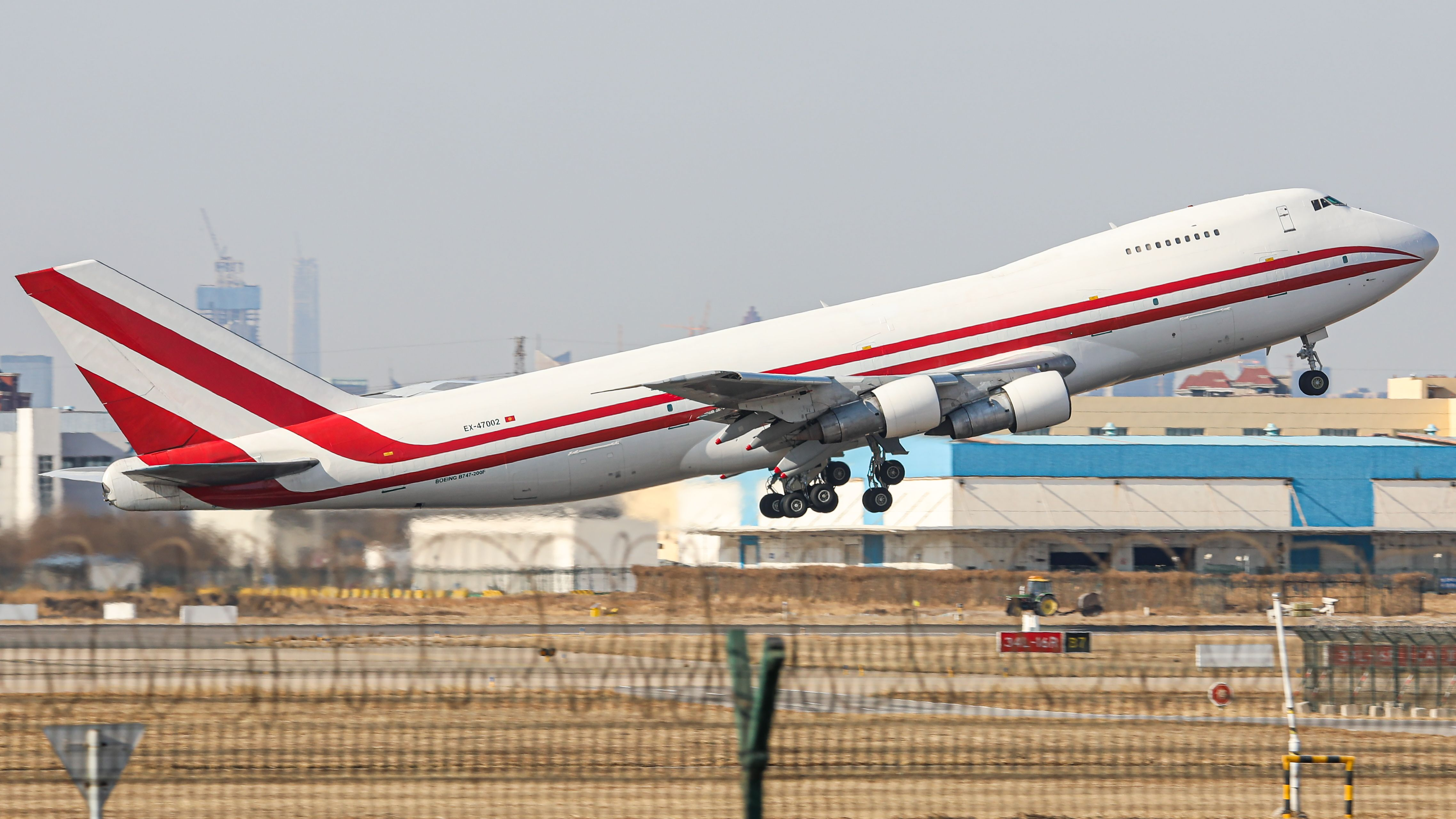
- An Aerostan Boeing 747-200F
IATA	ICAO	Call sign
KW	BSC	BIG SHOT
- Founded: 2004 (first iteration), 2020 (second iteration)
- Ceased operations: 2012 (first iteration)
- Hubs: Manas International Airport
- Fleet size: 2
- Headquarters: Bishkek, Kyrgyzstan
- Website: aerostan.aero

Aerostan is a cargo airline based in Manas International Airport, Kyrgyzstan, which flew from 2004 to 2012 and again from 2020 on. The airline focuses on chartered cargo flights.

== History ==
Aerostan founded in 2004, but had its license suspended in 2012. In the second half of 2020, Aerostan bought one Airbus A300B4-200F and two Boeing 747-200F, and converted a Boeing 727-200Adv into freighter. After acquiring the new planes, it resumed operation.

== Fleet ==
=== Current fleet ===
As of July 2026, Aerostan operates the following aircraft:

Aircraft	In service	Orders	Notes
Boeing 747-200F	3	—	
Total	3	—	

=== Former fleet ===
As of August 2025, Aerostan operated 2 Airbus A300B4-200F and 3 Boeing 747-200F.
