= Midwest Airlines (Egypt) =

Egyptian Airline

IATA	ICAO	Call sign
MY	MWA	MIDWEST
- Founded: 1998
- Ceased operations: 2012
- Hubs: Cairo International Airport
- Secondary hubs: Sharm el Sheikh; Hurghada
- Fleet size: 3
- Destinations: WRO WAW MXP FRU ALA FCO BLQ
- Headquarters: Cairo, Egypt
- Key people: Magdeldin Refaat (General Manager); Ismael Abd El-Azim (Operations Director); Jose Miguel CODINA (Commander 737); Javier CRESPO (Commander 737); Marco FOSSATI (First Officer 737); Boris GAMONEDA (First Officer 737)
- Website: www.mwestairlines.com

Midwest Airlines was an airline based in Cairo, Egypt, operating chartered passenger flights within Egypt and to Europe and Central Asia. It has since ceased all operations.

== History ==
Midwest Airlines was founded in 1998 with an initial fleet of two Airbus A310-300s. Of those, one was sold in 2004, while the other one is stored.

From its beginning, the airline offered charter services from Egyptian holiday resorts to Europe and the Middle East on behalf of local and international tour operators. Due to circumstances attributable to the then owners, the airline stopped operations in 2006. The sale of the company was formalized in May 2009, followed by more acquisitions of shares, and a restructuring and reorganization of the company was effectively started in September 2009. Concerted efforts during 2009 brought Midwest back into the air operations scene. A Boeing 737-600 SU-MWC was dry leased, which enabled the airline to renew its AOC.

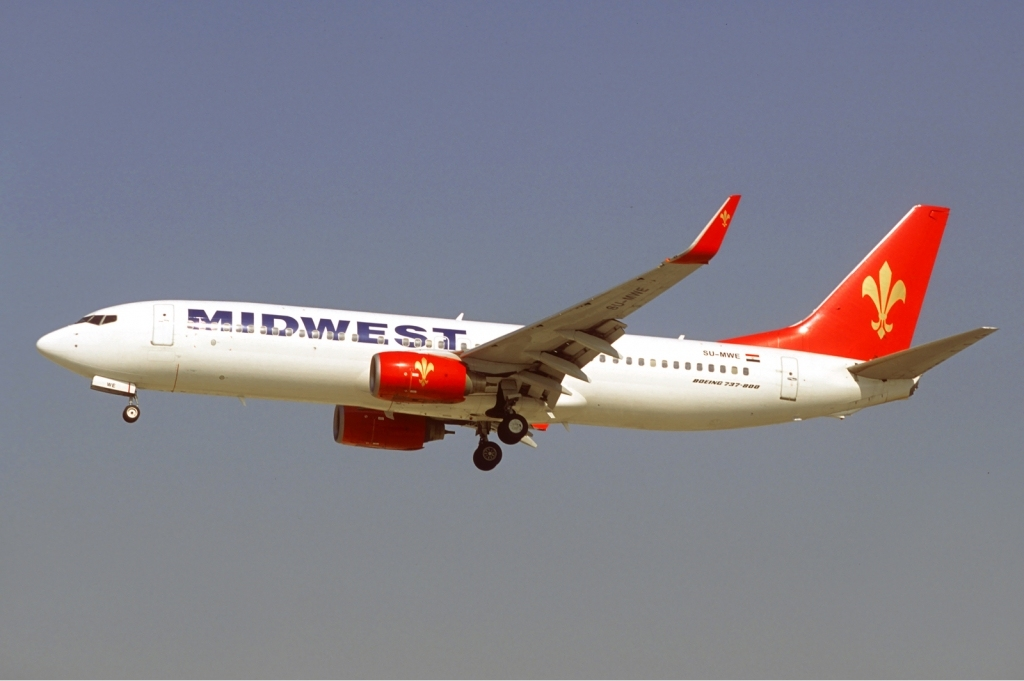
Midwest Airlines (Egypt)

== Fleet ==
The Midwest Airlines fleet consisted of the following aircraft :

Midwest Airlines Fleet
Aircraft	In Fleet	Passengers	Operated
Airbus A310-304	2	18C 190Y	August 1999-2006
Boeing 737-600	1	130Y	2010
Boeing 737-800	3	189Y	August 2010-July 2013
