= Sunclass Airlines =

Charter airline of Denmark

Sunclass Airlines A/S

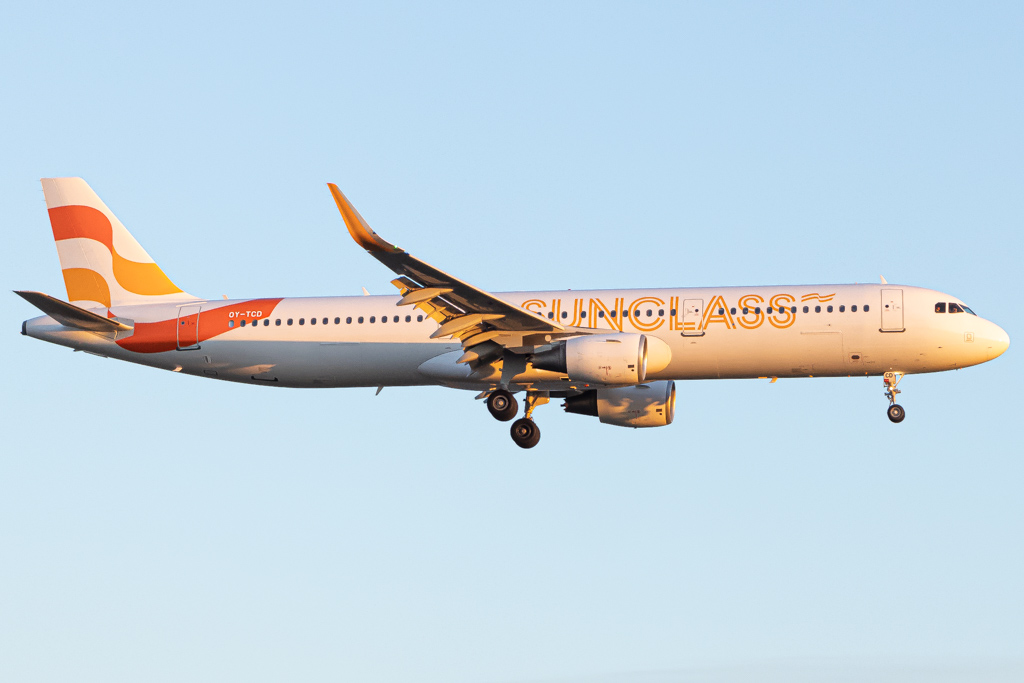
- Airbus A321-200
IATA	ICAO	Call sign
DK	VKG	VIKING
- Founded: 1 January 1994; 32 years ago (as Premiair)
- Commenced operations: 1 January 1994; 32 years ago (as Premiair); 1 May 2002; 24 years ago (as MyTravel Airways S/A); 8 May 2008; 18 years ago (as Thomas Cook Airlines Scandinavia); 1 November 2019; 6 years ago (as Sunclass Airlines)
- Operating bases: Billund; Copenhagen; Gothenburg; Helsinki; Malmö; Oslo; Stockholm–Arlanda
- Fleet size: 12
- Parent company: Nordic Leisure Travel Group: Altor Funds (39.74%); Strawberry Group (39.73%); TDR Capital (19.87%); Staff (0.66%)
- Headquarters: Copenhagen, Denmark
- Key people: Valdemar Warburg (CEO)
- Employees: 1,020
- Website: www.sunclassairlines.dk

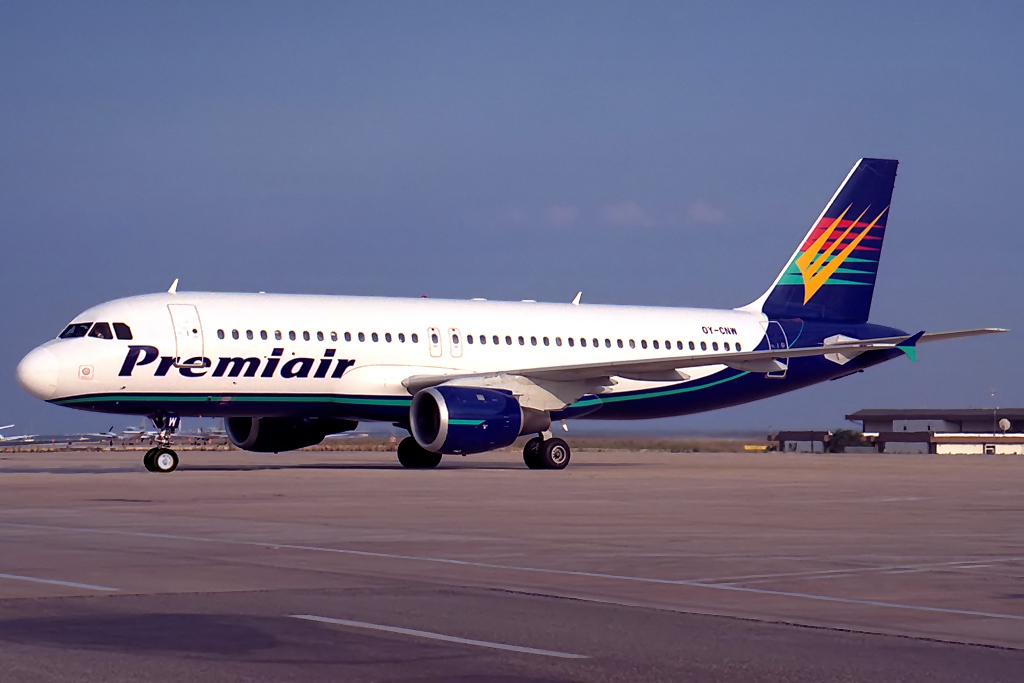
Premiair Airbus A320

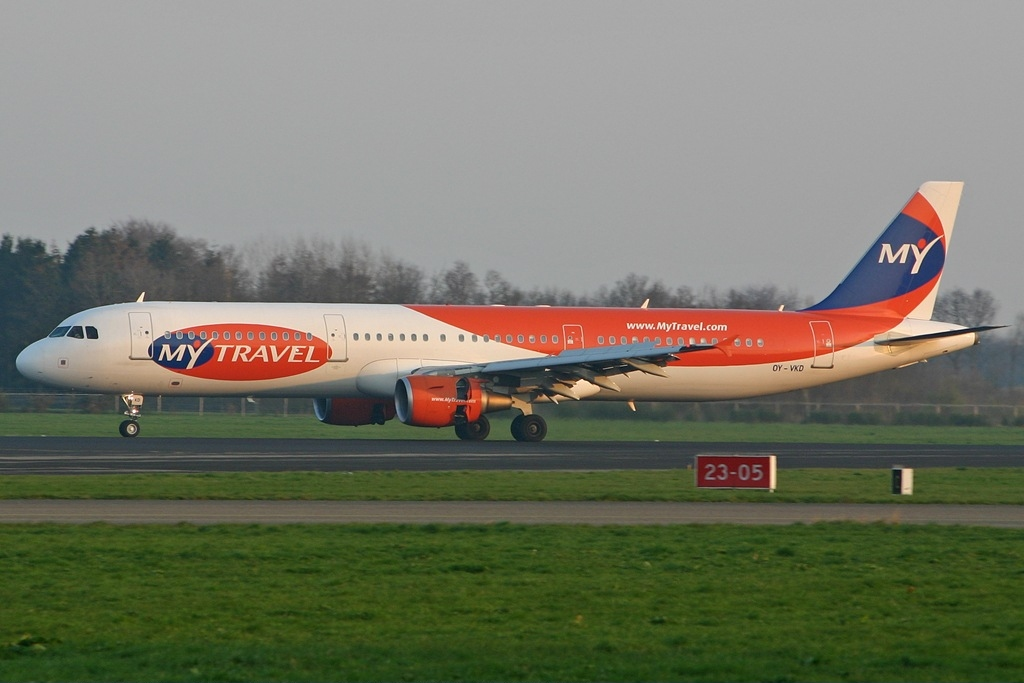
Airbus A321 of MyTravel at Groningen (Eelde), Netherlands

Sunclass Airlines A/S is a Danish charter airline that operates services from Norway, Sweden, Denmark and Finland. The air carrier is affiliated with Ving Group, a Nordic tour operator. It was, together with Ving Group, part of Thomas Cook Group until 23 December 2019 when Norwegian investor Petter Stordalen and Strawberry Group renamed it Sunclass Airlines.

== History ==
=== Background ===
The airline's roots trace back to two airlines: Conair of Scandinavia, owned by Danish Spies Group, and the Swedish Scanair, of the Swedish SLG - Scandinavian Leisure Group. These two charter airlines were put together in September 1993 and the merged company was officially established on 1 January 1994 as Premiair A/S. In 1994, SLG (still one of the owners) was acquired by the British conglomerate Airtours. On 1 May 2002, the airline adopted the brand MyTravel Airways (MyTravel Airways Scandinavia) in parallel with the change of the British partner.

In May 2008, after MyTravel Group had been bought by Thomas Cook Group, the airline was renamed Thomas Cook Airlines Scandinavia.

On 23 September 2019, Thomas Cook Group plc went into administration and ceased trading with immediate effect after failing to secure £200 million in emergency funding. This caused the airline to initially suspend operations, which were resumed some weeks later. It continued to operate flights to leisure destinations, mainly in the Mediterranean area and to the Canary Islands, as well as some long-haul service from several airports in the Nordic countries until November 2019.

=== New investors and new name ===
On 30 October 2019, it was announced that a new investment consortium consisting of Norwegian businessman Petter Stordalen (Strawberry Group) and two private firms (Altor Equity Partners and TDR Capital) had acquired Ving Group (also known as Thomas Cook Northern Europe) from AlixPartners which handled the acquisitions of Thomas Cook Airlines Scandinavia, Ving, Tjäreborg and Spies and was also one of the liquidators of Thomas Cook Group. Following the acquisition, the air carrier was renamed Sunclass Airlines on 23 December and acquired a new air operator's certificate (AOC).

While the Thomas Cook Airlines Scandinavia name would continue to be visible to passengers in tickets, airport plates, and aircraft liveries for an unspecified period during the rebranding process, the airline retained Thomas Cook's original "sunny heart" logo. In December 2020, just over a year since its new name, Sunclass unveiled a totally different graphic image, discarding definitively the Thomas Cook Group logo and trademark. In November 2021, Sunclass Airlines announced an Airbus A330neo, very suitable for its long-haul operations, would be delivered in the following year. Sunclass is also eyeing potential routes within the Airbus A330-900's range like Delhi, Newark, Toronto, Chicago, Hong Kong, and Johannesburg.

On 16 June 2026, Norwegian announced its intention to buy the airline's parent company, Nordic Leisure Travel Group.

== Corporate affairs ==
=== Financials ===
The airline's Financial Year data starting 1 October and ending 31 September are shown below:

Year	Turnover (kr.th.)	Net profit (kr.th.)	Number of employees{	Number of passengers (m)	Passenger load factor (%)	Number of aircraft	References
2019–20	1,493	−540	875	0.728	91	11	
2020–21	601	−252	506	0.188	62	10	
2021–22	2,734	−14	654	1.612	90	10	
2022–23	3,908	−124	810	1.908	92	11	
2023–24	4,020	4	905	2.036	91	12	
2024–25	4,069	123	868	2.068	91	12	

== Destinations ==
As of 2026, Sunclass Airlines serves charter flights to 52 countries including to Europe, Southeast Asia and Africa.

== Fleet ==
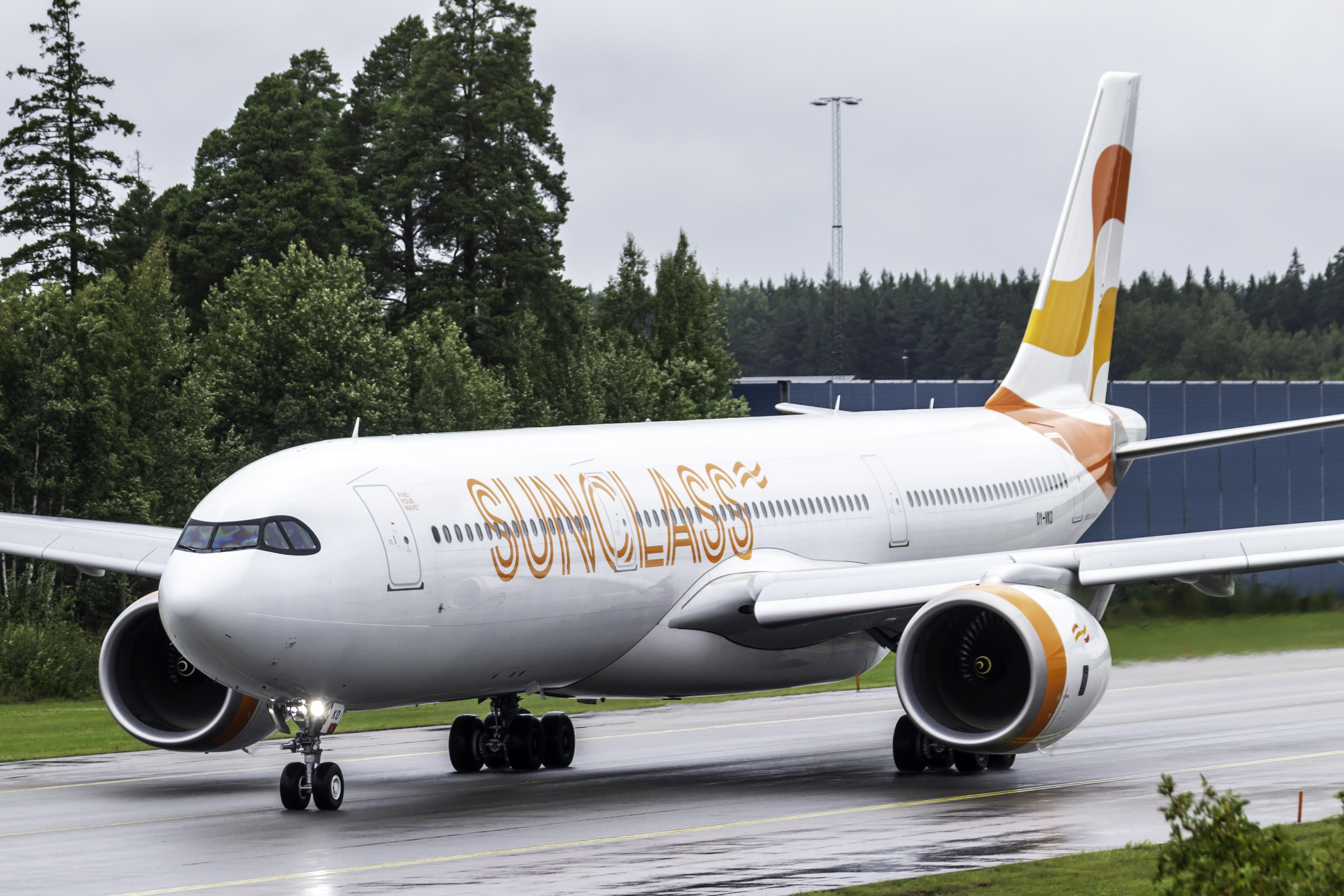
Sunclass Airlines Airbus A330-900 OY-VKO.

=== Current fleet ===
As of July 2026, Sunclass Airlines operates the following aircraft:

Sunclass Airlines fleet
Aircraft	In service	Orders	Passengers	Notes
Airbus A321	6	—	212	To be replaced by Airbus A321neo.
Airbus A321neo	3	6	218	Replacing Airbus A321-200.
Airbus A330-900neo	3	1	373	Winter configuration.
Airbus A330-900neo	3	1	385	Summer configuration.
Total	12	9		

=== Former fleet ===
As of August 2025, Sunclass Airlines operated 6 Airbus A321, 3 Airbus A321neo, 1 Airbus A330-300 and 3 Airbus A330-900neo

Sunclass Airlines and its predecessors had previously operated the following aircraft:

Aircraft	Total	Introduced	Retired	Notes
Airbus A300B4	3	1994	2001	
Airbus A320-200	20	1994	2015	
Airbus A330-200	3	1999	2024	
Boeing 757-200	1	2002	2003	
McDonnell Douglas DC-10-10	4	1995	2001	
McDonnell Douglas DC-10-30	1	1997	1998	

== See also ==
- List of airlines of Denmark
