= Conair of Scandinavia =

Danish charter airline

Conair

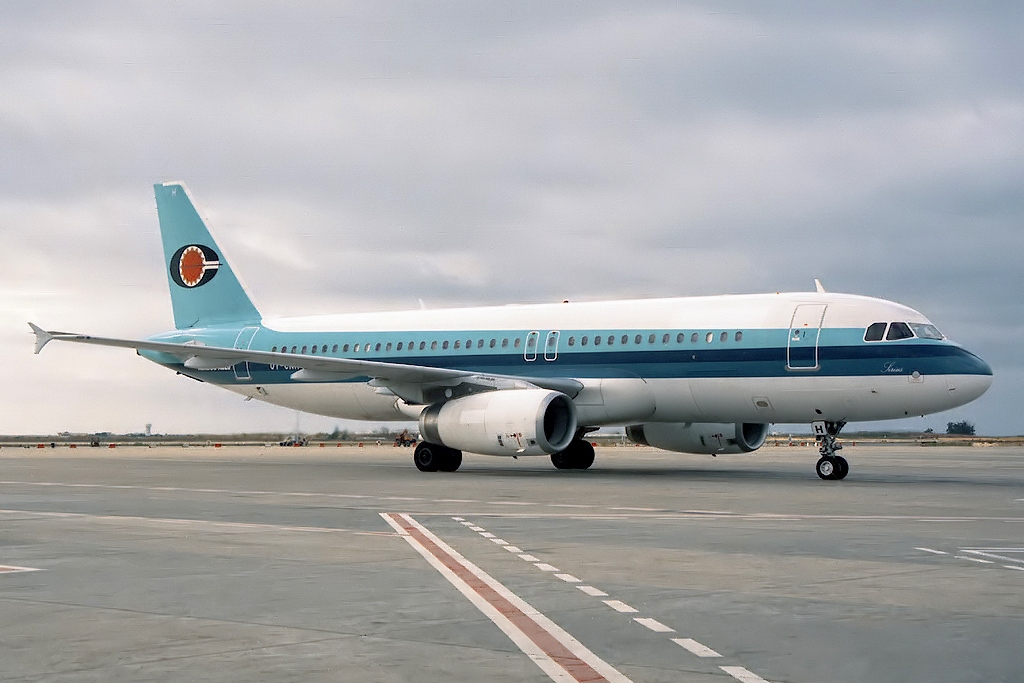
- Airbus A320-200
IATA	ICAO	Call sign
OY	OYC	CONAIR
- Founded: 1965
- Ceased operations: 1 January 1994 (merged with Scanair to form Premiair)
- Operating bases: Billund Airport; Copenhagen Airport; Stockholm Arlanda Airport
- Fleet size: 8
- Headquarters: Copenhagen, Denmark
- Founder: Simon Spies

Conair A/S was a Danish charter airline based at Copenhagen Airport. It merged with Scanair to form Premiair.

== History ==
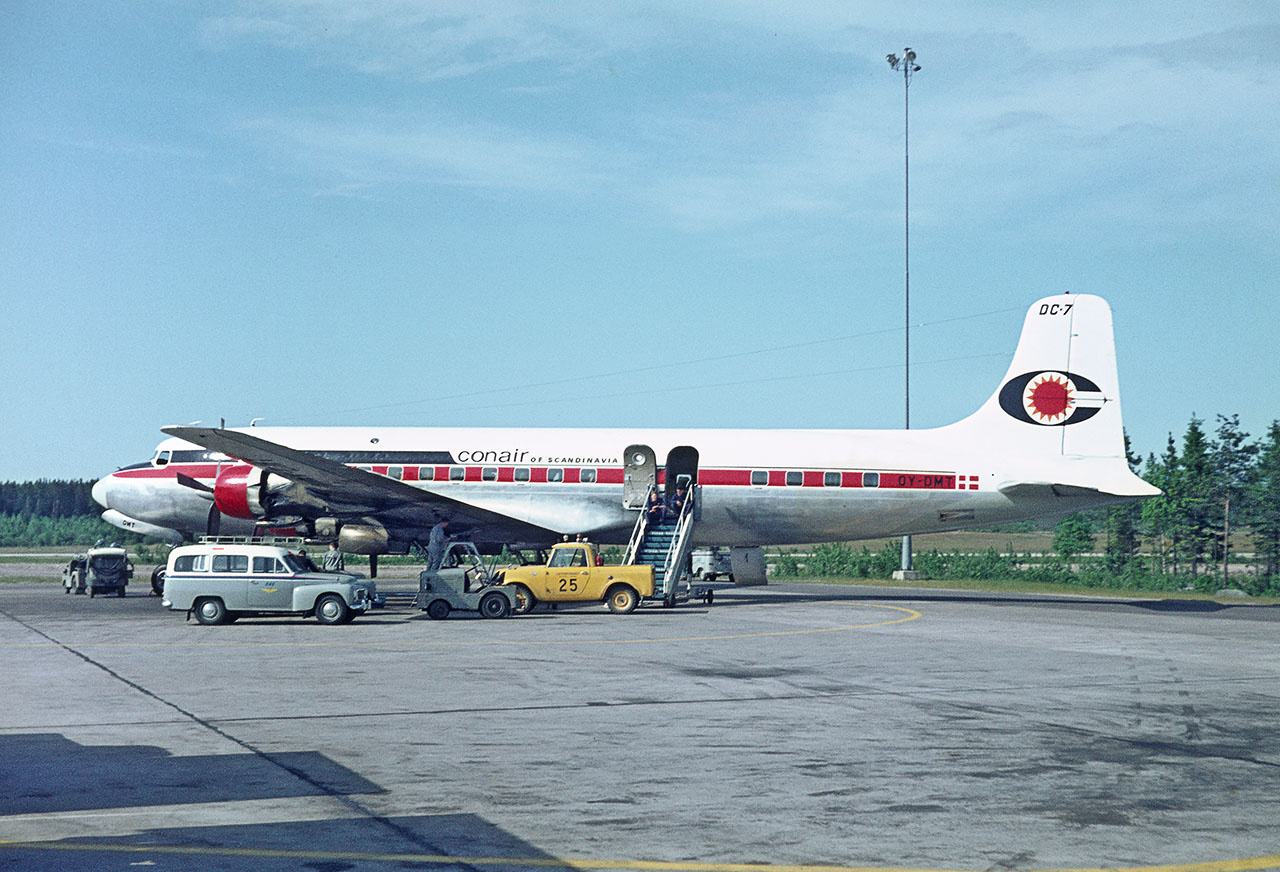
Douglas DC-7 in 1965

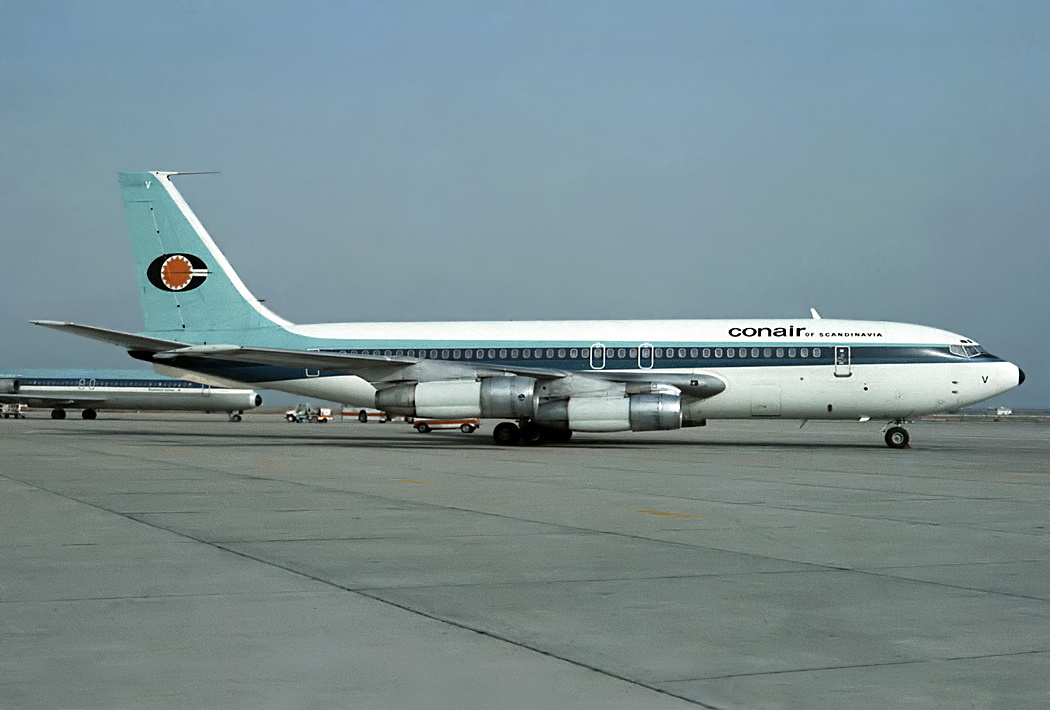
Boeing 720B in 1986

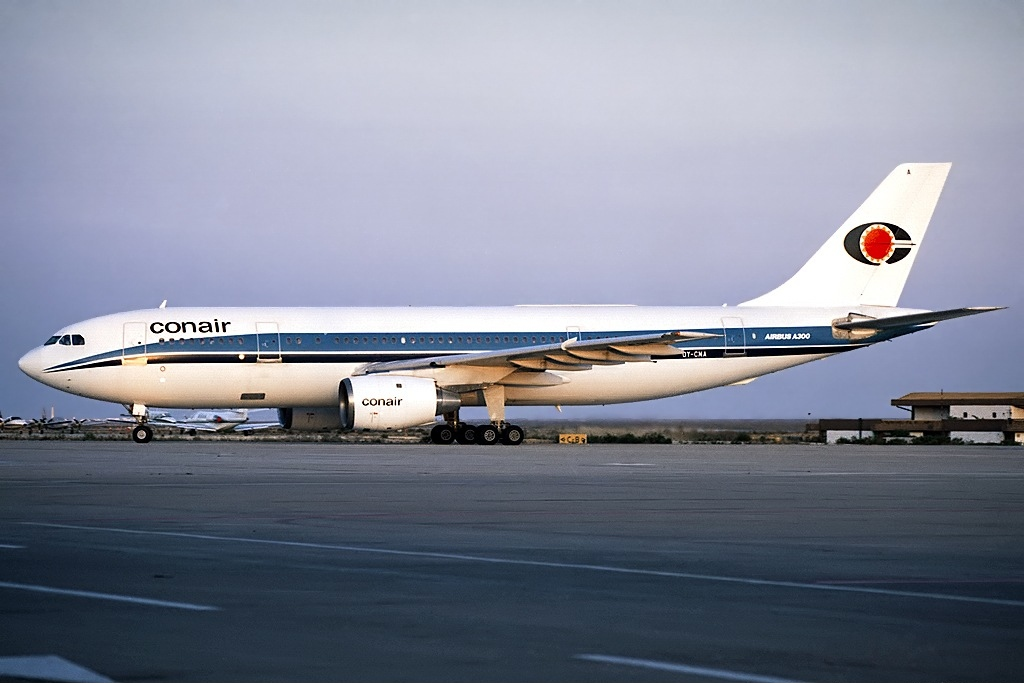
Airbus A300

Conair was founded by the Scandinavian charter pioneer Simon Spies in late 1964. The fleet was from scratch old Douglas DC-7s, which were taken over from fellow airline Flying Enterprise. Flight operations were started on 1 April of the following year. In 1970 Conair entered the jet age and bought second-hand Boeing 720Bs from Eastern Air Lines. In autumn of 1987, two Boeings had their nose gear cracked during otherwise normal landings in Salzburg, Austria and Rome, Italy. The fleet was already set to be renewed with second-hand Airbus A300B4s, but after the two incidents the B720 replacement became a very urgent issue. Both Airbus A300B4s and Airbus A310-200s entered the fleet within a few weeks and sent to scrapyards all the Boeings.

After the death of Simon Spies, his new wife and former secretary Janni Spies found herself at the head of the whole Spies conglomerate (in which the traveling agency Spies rejser was included) and she employed her brother, a former carpenter, as general manager. They soon ordered six Airbus A320s from the manufacturer at the same time of the Gulf War. In the aftermath of the conflict, a sudden drop of passenger worldwide was a factor (which among other things) led to the bankruptcy of several important airlines. Conair and the Spies travel agency were saved (almost as a Danish national treasure due to the huge popularity of the former "charter king", the deceased Simon Spies) by banks, and Janni Spies and the staff were dismissed and replaced. However, the market had contracted and negotiations began between two of the largest Scandinavian airlines of the charter sector. On 1 January 1994, Conair officially merged with the Swedish airline Scanair, forming a new charter carrier, Premiair. This became Thomas Cook Airlines Scandinavia in Spring 2008.

== Operations ==
Conair primarily flew tourists from the Spies traveling agency, but also served several other travel agencies. The vast majority of flights had their destinations in the Mediterranean area but also at Canary Islands, Gambia, London, Rome and Paris. Beside their main base at Copenhagen, flights also departed from Billund Airport and Stockholm Arlanda Airport.

== See also ==
- List of defunct airlines of Denmark
