= Air Maldives =

Airline of the Maldives (1974–2000)

IATA	ICAO	Call sign
L6	AMI	AIR MALDIVES
- Founded: 1 October 1974; 51 years ago
- Ceased operations: 1 March 2000; 26 years ago
- Hubs: Male' International Airport
- Fleet size: 9
- Destinations: 14
- Headquarters: Malé, Maldives
- Key people: Anbaree Abdul Sattar (Chairman); Fauzi Bin Ayob (MD)

Air Maldives was the first flag carrier of the Maldives. It was established on 1 October 1974 during the presidency of Ibrahim Nasir. After operating for about 26 years, the airline declared bankruptcy and stopped all operations in 2000.

== History ==
=== 1970s ===
Air Maldives entered into service with two Convair 440 aircraft purchased from Caribbean United Airlines, dubbed "Flying Fish I" (8Q-AM101) and "Flying Fish II" (8Q-AM102). The first Air Maldives aircraft landed at Hulhulé Airport on 9 October 1974.

The airline operated scheduled daily flights between Male' and Colombo six times a week, with maintenance work being carried out on the seventh day. A domestic service was also commenced, with a fortnightly flight between Male' and Gan. Meanwhile, the airline appointed travel agents in Colombo to sell tickets and Air Ceylon to undertake airport handling, thus allowing it to minimise its own ground staffing requirements.

In 1976, a Singapore-based company called Tri-9 Corporation obtained 49% shareholding in the airline, and took over the management and operation of the airline on 1 June. The airline also stopped its flights to Gan following the withdrawal of the Royal Air Force from their airbase on the island.

When Tri-9 took over, the two aircraft owned by the airline were in very poor shape and were ferried to Seletar, Singapore for overhauling. One of the aircraft (8Q-AM101, Flying Fish I) was found to be beyond economic repair and was stored at Seletar, where it remained until it was broken up. It was replaced in October 1976 by another Convair 440 aircraft (reg. N90907) which was owned by Tri-9. Meanwhile, Flying Fish II (8Q-AM102) underwent a major overhaul and entered service again in November 1976.

In May 1977, the airline ceased all operations after the Maldivian Government grounded its aircraft and froze its assets. As for the fate of the two aircraft in operation at the time, N90907 was returned to Singapore while 8Q-AM102 (Flying Fish II) was stored at Hulhulé Airport until it was sold in January 1979.

=== 1980s ===
During the beginning of the 1980s the airline was confined to the domestic field. It operated regular flights with a Short Skyvan between Malé and Gan, in Addu Atoll.

The Skyvan was replaced by two Dornier 228 planes in the late 1980s when two further domestic airports were opened in Hanimaadhoo (Haa Dhaalu Atoll) and Kadhdhoo (Laamu Atoll).

=== 1990s ===
During its last phase, in the 1990s, Air Maldives, boosted by a new flow of investment, went international again. Air Maldives became a joint venture airline between the Maldivian government, which owned 51 percent, and Naluri Berhad (the majority shareholder of Malaysia Airlines), which held the remaining 49 percent.

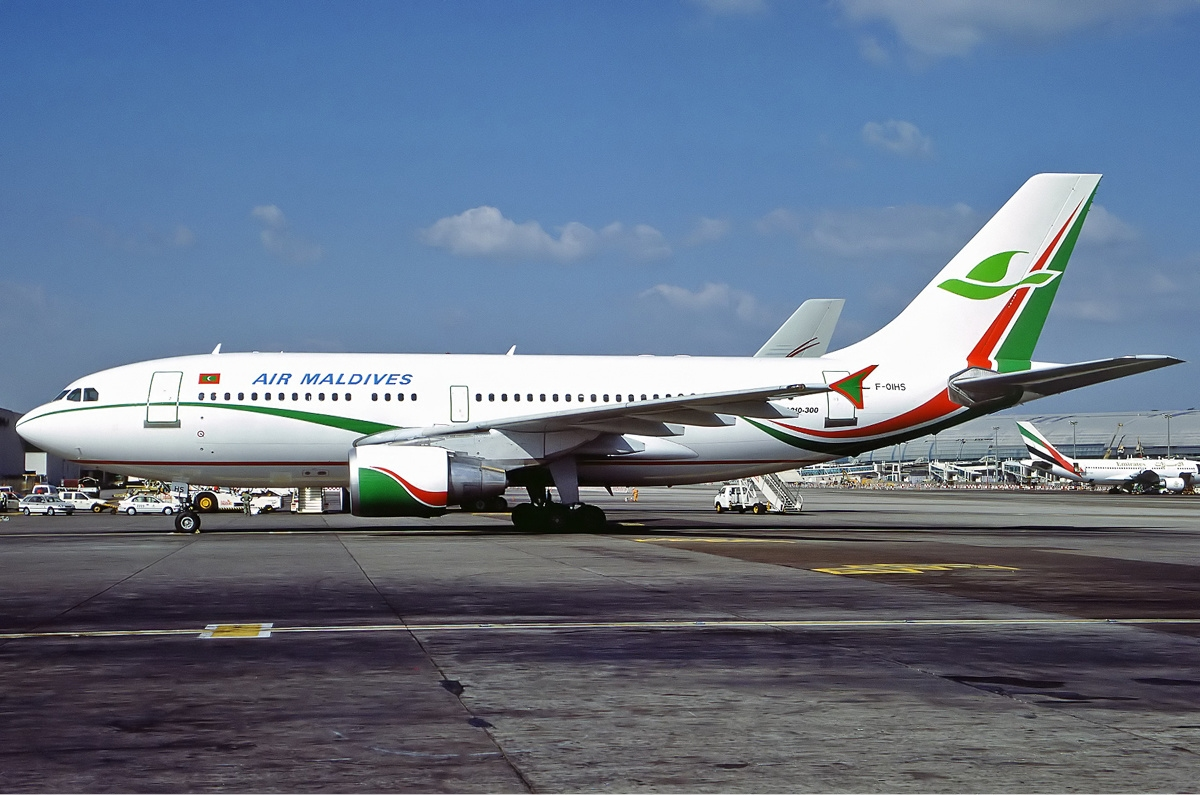
Air Maldives Airbus A310

The airline's operations were extended and on 10 November 1994 began operating scheduled flights to Dubai, Colombo, Trivandrum and Kuala Lumpur. Flights to Bangkok and London (via Dubai) were introduced later on.

== Bankruptcy ==
In 2000, Air Maldives was dissolved due to bankruptcy with losses estimated at between US$69.2 million. The circumstances of the demise of the Maldive national flag carrier were at best obscure and they were never fully publicised. Apparently, officers in high government posts are meant to be protected by this silence.

Maldivian people were disappointed and puzzled at the secrecy and the strange and sudden circumstances of the disappearance of their national airline. Explanations were asked in a quite loud and straightforward manner for a country that does not have free press. But all the blame of the bankruptcy was conveniently heaped on Malaysian entrepreneur Tajudin Ramli, former Malaysia Airlines chief executive officer, and public outcry in the Maldives soon died down.

== Fleet ==
- 2 x Airbus A300 (leased and returned)
- 3 x Airbus A310 (leased and returned)
- 1 x de Havilland Canada Dash 8 (Still in service with Maldivian (airline) as 8Q-AMD)
- 2 x Dornier 228 (Both scrapped in 2008)
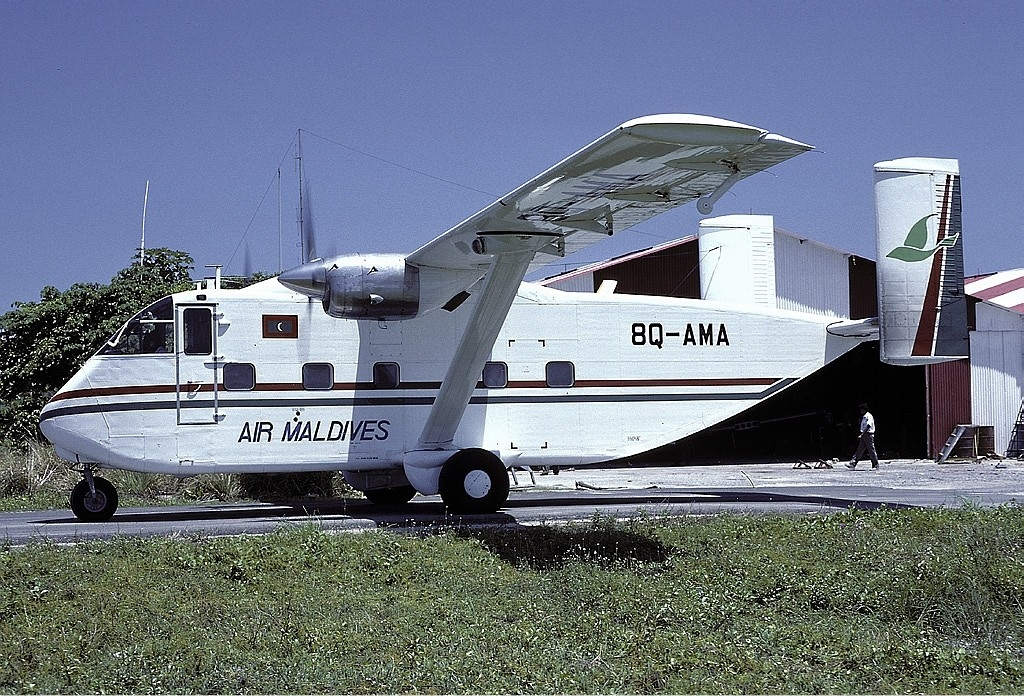
  Short SC-7 Skyvan
- 1 x Short SC-7 Skyvan (Sold in 1991)
- 2 x Convair 440 (1 sold, 1 scrapped)

== Livery ==
Over 26 years of operation, Air Maldives aircraft went through four different liveries.

== Destinations ==
- France - Paris
- Germany - Frankfurt
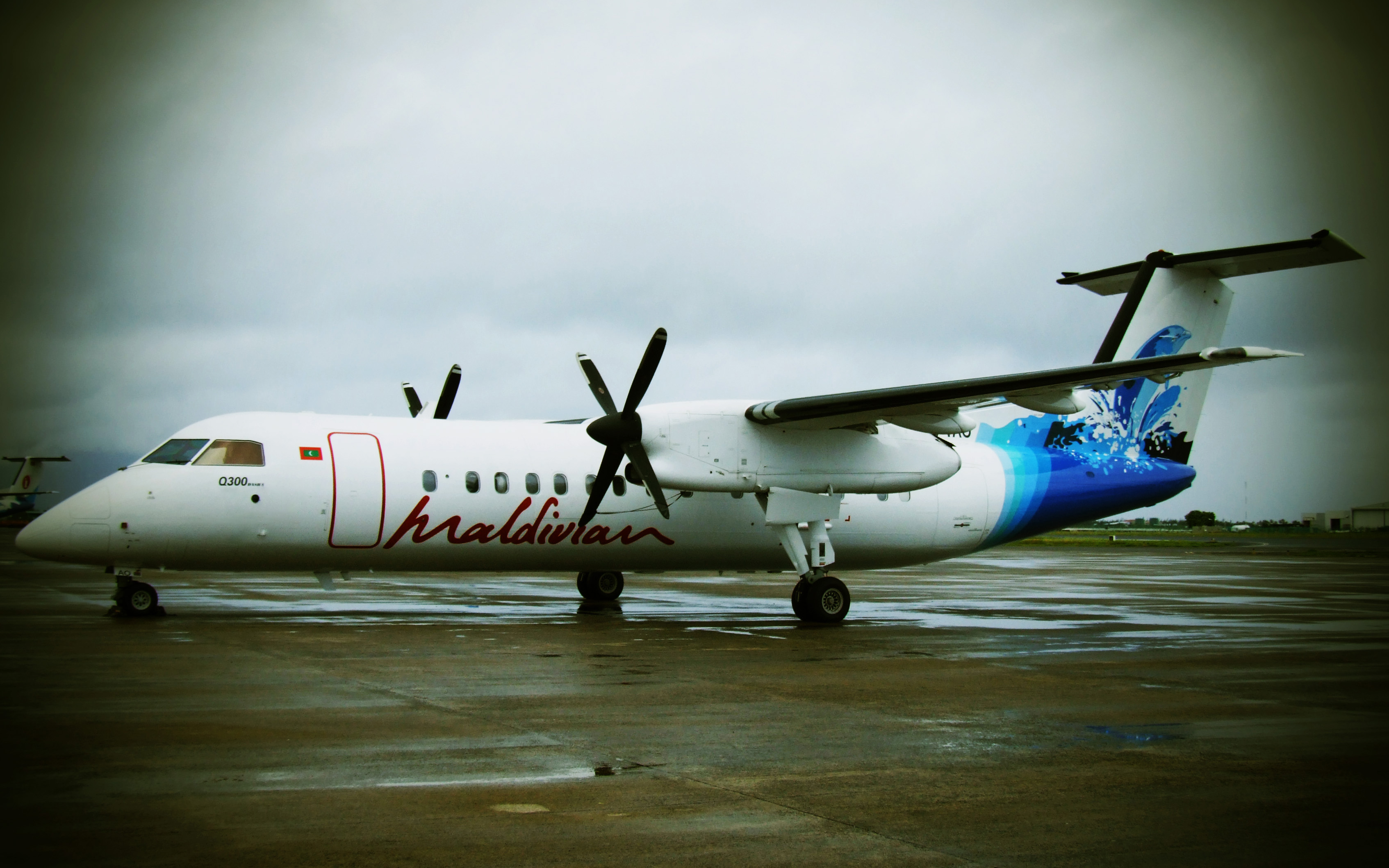
  Flag carrier of the country was handed over to Island Aviation (now Maldivian) from Air Maldives after the bankruptcy
- India - Kochi, Trivandrum
- Japan - Tokyo
- Maldives - Male', Gan, Hanimaadhoo, Kaadedhdhoo, Kadhdhoo
- Malaysia - Kuala Lumpur
- South Korea - Seoul
- Sri Lanka - Colombo
- Thailand - Bangkok
- United Arab Emirates - Dubai
- United Kingdom - London, Manchester
