= Scanair =

Charter airline in Stockholm, Sweden (1961–1994)

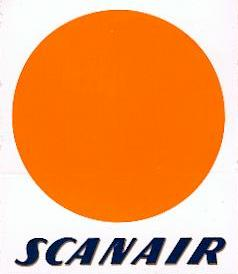
IATA	ICAO	Call sign
DK	VKG	VIKING
- Founded: June 1961
- Commenced operations: 4 September 1961
- Ceased operations: 1 January 1994 (merged with Conair of Scandinavia to form Premiair)
- Operating bases: Stockholm Arlanda Airport
- Fleet size: 4
- Parent company: Scandinavian Airlines
- Headquarters: Stockholm, Sweden

Scanair was a Swedish charter airline of Danish origins that operated between 1961 and 1994. Its head office was in Bromma, Stockholm Municipality, Sweden.

== History ==
Scanair was founded in Denmark in June 1961 and was partially owned by Scandinavian Airlines. The first aircraft operated was a Douglas DC-7 for charter flights to Spain, North Africa, and the United States. In 1965, the headquarters was moved to Stockholm and SAS supplied Scanair with Douglas DC-8 aircraft. Soon thereafter, two Boeing 747s joined the growing fleet and Scanair soon became the biggest charter company in Scandinavia.

Other destinations served throughout the years the Canary Islands, Sri Lanka, Thailand, and the winter resorts of Austria, Germany and Switzerland. To increase capacity, the Airbus A300 was acquired, although their range was not sufficient for the needs and those were soon replaced with the McDonnell Douglas DC-10. Scanair grew so much that by the 1980's, they were carrying over 2 million passengers a year, but that was not enough to turn a profit so it merged with the Danish airline Conair of Scandinavia on 1 January 1994. The new airline was called Premiair, which continues to operate today as Sunclass Airlines.

== See also ==
- List of defunct airlines of Sweden
