= List of defunct airlines of Denmark =

This is a list of defunct airlines of Denmark including the Faroe Islands.

Airlines of Greenland are listed in list of airlines of Greenland.

Airline	Image	IATA	ICAO	Callsign	Commenced operations	Ceased operations	Notes
A
Aalborg Air Taxi					1996	2007	Operated Cessna Citation I, Aérospatiale Corvette, Piper Navajo, Piper Twin Comanche, Piper Cherokee
Aero-Nord					1965	1965	
Air Business					1981	1988	Purchased by Maersk Air in 1983 and renamed Maersk Commuter in 1988
Air Karlog			KLG		1994	1995	
Alkair A/S		LK	LKA	ALKAIR	1978	2000	Operated Beech King Air, Fokker F27, Cessna Citation III, Embraer Bandeirante
Alpeflyet		OY			2018	2019	Operated Airbus A320-200
Aviation Assistance		7W	VIS		1991	2006	Operated Beech Super King Air
B
BackBone Aviation			BOS		2011	2018	Operated Canadair CRJ-100
C
Cimber A/S		QA	CIM	CIMBER	2012	2018	Merged into CityJet
Cimber Air		QI	CIM		1950	2009	Rebranded Cimber Sterling
Cimber Sterling		QA	CIM	CIMBER	2009	2012	Went bankrupt
Comefly					2011	2013	Virtual airline
Conair of Scandinavia		OY	OYC		1965	1993	Merged with Scanair to form Premiair
Copenhagen Air Services						1977	Bought by Sterling Airlines
D
Danair		DX	DEN	DANISH	1971	1995	Joint venture between Scandinavian Airlines System, Maersk Air and Cimber Air
Danish Air Lines		DD	DDL		1918	1951	Merged with Swedish Intercontinental Airlines and Norwegian Air Lines to form Scandinavian Airlines
Dansk Luftfart Service					1963	1963	Aerial photography
Dansk Lufttransport					1923	1924	Merged into Danish Air Lines
E
Europas					2007	2007	
F
Falck Air					1968	1998	Merged scheduled operations into Maersk Air
Faroe Airlines					1946	1946	
Faroe Airways				FAIRLINE	1965	1967	
FaroeJet		F6	RCK	ROCKROSE	2005	2006	
FlyClassic							
Fly European Airlines		E7	FLE		1999	2000	
Flying Enterprise					1959	1965	After bankruptcy assets rescued by Conair of Scandinavia
Flyvsmart			BDI		2005	2006	Operated Embraer Bandeirante
G
GLACE					1994	2004	Greenland
Great Dane Airlines		DW	GDE	GREAT DANE	2018	2021	
H
Hom-Fly					1976	1979	
I
Internord		NK	None	Internord	1965	1968	Formed as a commercial partnership by Aero-Nord and Swedish Osterman Air Charter. Operated Douglas DC-7, Convair 990
J
K
Karlog Air Charter			KLG		2004	2010	Operated Cessna Citation, Piper Seneca
M
Maersk Air		DM	DAN	MAERSKAIR	1969	2005	Merged into Sterling Airlines
Maersk Commuter					1981	1990	Merged into Maersk Air
Metro Airways					1979	1992	Operated Fairchild Swearingen Metroliner, Mitsubishi MU-300 Diamond
Midtfly					1971	1989	Operated Swearingen Merlin, Piper Apache Merged into Business Flight Services
Muk Air		ZR	MUK	MUKAIR	1979	2001	Operated ATR 42, BN-2 Islander, Beech 99, Short 330, Short 360, Swearingen Merlin
MyTravel Airways		DK	VKG		2002	2008	Premiair trading name
N
NewAir-Newair Airservice A.S.		8L	NAW		1977	2003	Operated Fairchild F-27
Nordair-Nordic Airways					1960	1964	Operated Douglas DC-6
Norfly Skole og Rundflyvning					1963	1971	Bought Aalborg Flying Center in 1970. Renamed North Flying
P
Premiair A/S		DK	VKG		1994	2002	Formed by the merger of Conair of Scandinavia and Scanair from Sweden Renamed Thomas Cook Airlines Scandinavia
Primera Air		PF	PRI	PRIMERA	2009	2018	Primera Air of Iceland subsidiary
S
SAS Commuter "Eurolink"		SK	SAS	Scandinavian	1984	2008	Scandinavian Airlines subsidiary Joint regional carrier of Denmark, Norway, and Sweden
Scan Con Airways					2002	2004	Operated EMB-110, leased Saab 340
Scandinavian Air Taxi					1978	1994	Formed by the merger of Aalborg Air Taxi, BK-Fly, Interair Business Aviation, Midt-Fly, Superflite
Sønderjyllands Flyveselskab					1950	1953	Renamed Cimber Air
Sterling					2000	2005	Previously Sterling European Airlines Merged to form Sterling Airlines A/S
Sterling Airlines A/S		NB	SNB	STERLING	2005	2008	Formed by the merger of Maersk Air and Sterling
Sterling Airways A/S		NB			1962	1993	Went into bankruptcy. Succeeded by Sterling European Airlines
Sterling European Airlines					1994	2000	Inherited part of Sterling Airways assets Renamed Sterling
T
Thomas Cook Airlines Scandinavia		DK	VKG	VIKING	2008	2019	Renamed Sunclass Airlines
TRANSair					1963	1965	Operated Airspeed Consul, Airspeed Oxford, Beech C-45 Expeditor
Transavia Denmark		PH	TDK	TDK	2008	2011	
U
United Europe Airways					1992	1992	
W
Wings of Bornholm			ETS	EXTRANS	2009	2010	
Z
Zone-Redningskorpset					1961	1961	Operated Lockheed 12A, SAI KZ III, SAI KZ IV, SAI KZ VII

== See also ==
- List of airlines of Denmark
- List of airports in Denmark
