= Flying Enterprise =

Flying Enterprise may refer to:

- SS Flying Enterprise, American ship sunk in 1952
- Flying Enterprise (airline), defunct Danish airline
