= Maersk Commuter =

Danish regional airline

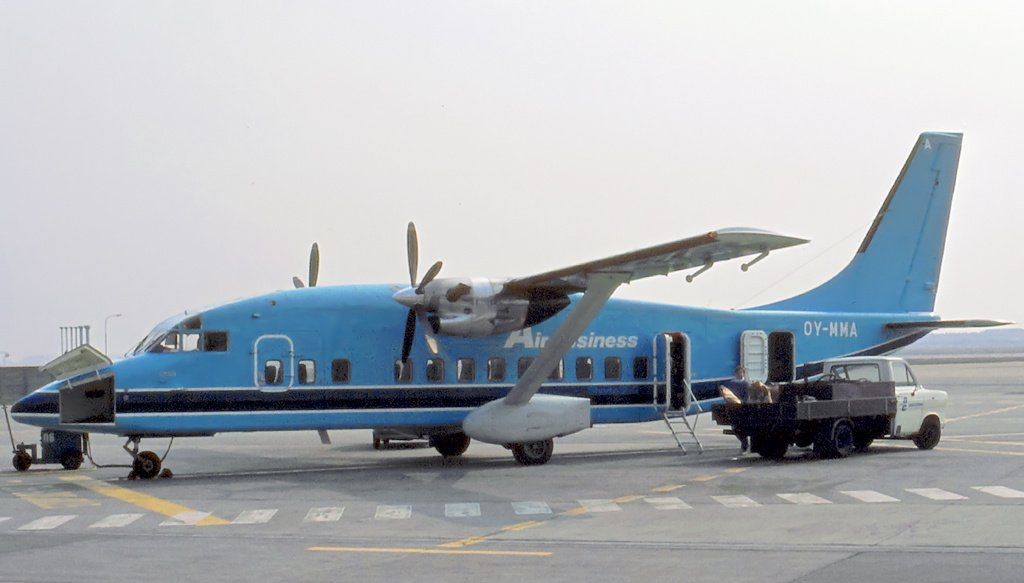
- Short 360
- Founded: 1981
- Ceased operations: 1990
- Operating bases: Esbjerg Airport
- Fleet size: 2
- Destinations: 4
- Parent company: Maersk Air
- Headquarters: Esbjerg Municipality, Denmark
- Website: Peter Alkærsig (founder)

Air Business A/S, later Maersk Commuter I/S, was a Danish regional airline which operated between 1981 and 1990. It was based at Esbjerg Airport and operated an Embraer EMB 110 Bandeirante and, from 1984, two Short 360s. It was the first Danish airline to break the Scandinavian Airlines System (SAS) international monopoly and gain a concession to fly an international scheduled service out of Denmark: from Esbjerg via Thisted Airport to Stavanger Airport, Sola. The background for the concession was the gradual deregulation of the European airline market, which was being carried out by the European Union. This first stage of this took effect in 1982, when airlines were free to operate any routes then wanted between two or more secondary airports, as determined by the authorities. Air Business was bought by Maersk Air in May 1983 and then replaced Thisted with Aalborg Airport. In addition to the scheduled service, the airline flew for the parent airline. It took Maersk Commuter name in 1988 and fully merged with Maersk Air in April 1990.

== History ==
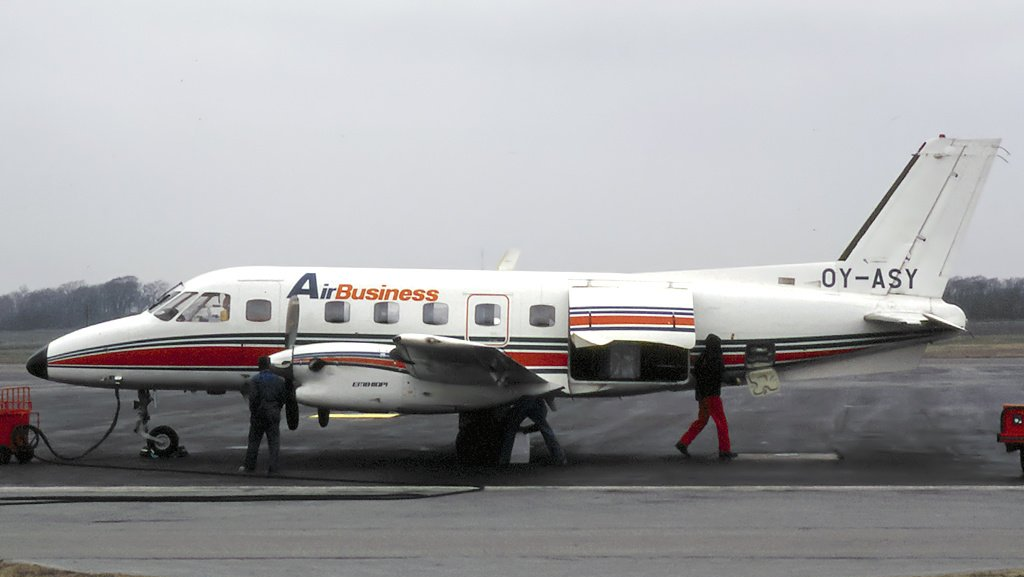
Embraer EMB 110 Bandeirante at Esbjerg Airport in 1982

Scandinavian Airlines System (SAS) had a monopoly of all international scheduled traffic from Denmark since 1961. Although some flights stopped at Aarhus, all international traffic had to go through Copenhagen Airport.

Air Business A/S was established by Peter Alkærsig, a former Second World War fighter pilot and later a SAS pilot. He founded Air Business in 1981, when he was at the age of 75, and was able to secure the first international scheduled Danish route concession not held by SAS. The route, which commenced in 1982, ran from Esbjerg via Thisted to Stavanger, Norway. The airline initially procured an Embraer EMB 110 Bandeirante for the route. For a better consolidation of the initiative Alkærsig placed it under the umbrella of already established Alkair airline.

At the time Maersk Air was looking for opportunities to expand internationally the network and opted to purchase the airline. This also allowed Maersk to market itself with an international scheduled route. The agreement took effect on 1 May 1983. Upon buying the airline, in the following December Maersk signed an order for two Short 360s. The following year the route pattern was changed: it still had Esbjerg and Stavanger as terminal points, but the intermediate stop became Aalborg Airport, which had a much larger catchment area.

With the delivery of the Shorts aircraft, Air Business was able to supplement its operations by providing flights on its parent behalf. The corporate name was kept until 1988, when it was renamed Maersk Commuter I/S. The owner hoped this image change would better reflect the connection between the two airlines. On 31 March 1990 operations were fully merged into those of Maersk Air. The Shorts were sold and the route was flown by Maersk Air's Fokker 50s.

== Destinations ==
The airline had its head office and base of operations at Esbjerg Airport in Esbjerg Municipality, Denmark. It operated a combination of scheduled services and wet lease to its parent. The company had 60 employees in 1988.

Destinations
City	Country	Airport	Begin	End
Aarhus	Denmark	Aarhus Airport	1984	1990
Esbjerg	Denmark	Esbjerg Airport	1982	1990
Thisted	Denmark	Thisted Airport	1982	1984
Stavanger	Norway	Stavanger Airport, Sola	1982	1990

== Fleet ==
The following aircraft were operated by the airline:

Fleet
Aircraft	Quantity	Period
Embraer EMB 110 Bandeirante	1	1982–84
Short 360	2	1984–90
