= Maersk Air =

Danish Airline

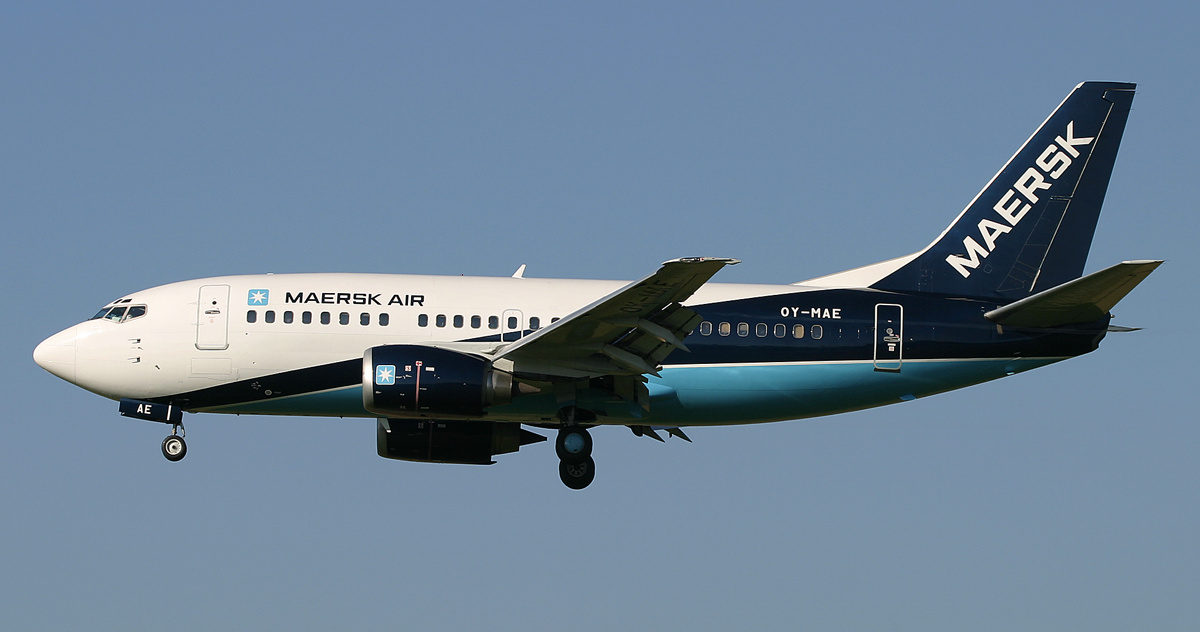
- Boeing 737-500
| IATA | ICAO | Call sign |
|---|---|---|
| DM | DAN | MAERSKAIR |
- Founded: 1969
- Ceased operations: 2005
- Operating bases: Billund Airport; Copenhagen Airport; Esbjerg Airport
- Frequent-flyer program: EuroBonus
- Subsidiaries: Maersk Air UK; Maersk Commuter; Star Air
- Fleet size: 18 (2005)
- Destinations: 33 (2005)
- Parent company: A. P. Møller–Mærsk Group
- Headquarters: Dragør Municipality, Denmark
- Website: maersk-air.com

Maersk Air A/S was a Danish airline which operated between 1969 and 2005. Owned by the A. P. Møller–Mærsk Group, it operated a mix of scheduled and charter passenger and cargo services. Headquartered at Dragør, its main operating bases were Copenhagen Airport, Billund Airport and Esbjerg Airport. The airline run also offshore helicopter operations from 1975 to 1999 and had three airline subsidiaries: Maersk Air UK, Maersk Commuter, and Star Air.

The airline was founded on 21 February 1969 - coinciding with the purchase of Falck Air regional airline scheduled operations - and legally incorporated on 1 January of the following year. Twin turboprops Fokker F27s were bought and scheduled domestic services from Copenhagen to Odense and Stauning started on 1 November 1969. From 1971 to 1995 Maersk participated in Danair consortium, which run all domestic services in Denmark. Maersk Air was heavily involved in the inclusive tours market during the 1970s, firstly operating Boeing 720Bs and later on 737-200s. From 1981 Maersk started international flights, first out of Billund and in the 1990s out of Copenhagen.

Maersk Air gradually invested in new aircraft, including the Fokker 50, Boeing 737 Classic, and later the 737-700. During the 1990s the number of international services increased, often codeshared with foreign airlines. When the Danish airlines were deregulated in 1995, Maersk first sought to compete with Scandinavian Airlines and later they created a "cartel". After being exposed, the airline fell into a decline after 2001, posting large deficits from which it never recovered. The airline was bought by the FL Group and merged to form Sterling Airlines in the fall of 2005.

== History ==
=== Establishment ===
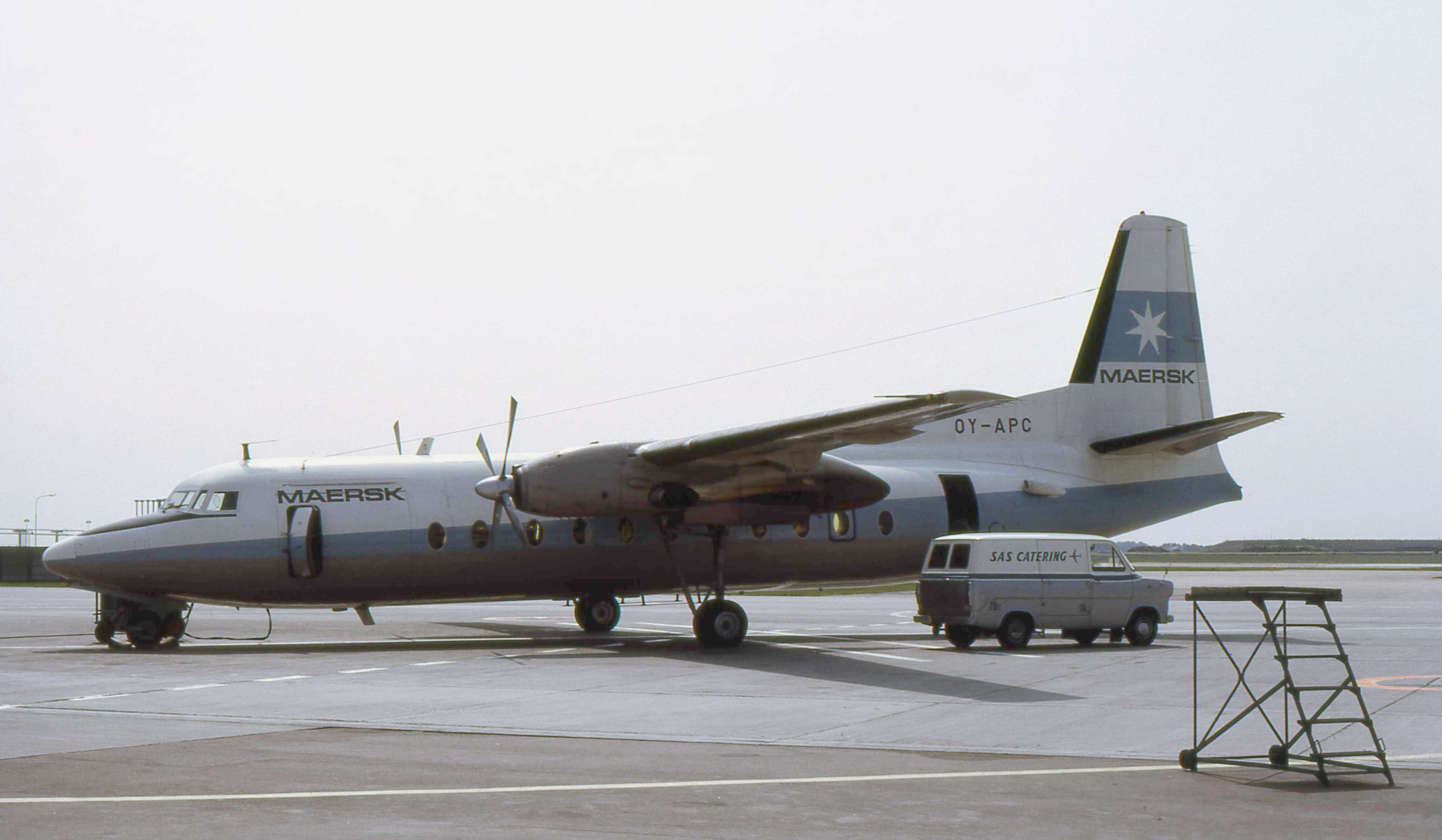
A Fokker F27 at Pisa Airport in 1972

The giant shipping entity A. P. Moller first investment in aviation was in 1937 when it bought a stake in Danish Air Lines, at the time the Danish flag carrier. Its next step took place in 1967, when the group bought a Hawker Siddeley HS 125-3B corporate jet. At that time there were few possibilities for Danish airlines as the charter market was dominated by Spies Rejser and Tjæreborgs Rejser, each of them with their own airline: Conair and Sterling, respectively. Scandinavian Airlines System (SAS) was the flag carrier and had the sole right to run international scheduled services, and freight charters could only be carried out if the entire load had a single shipper and recipient.

The establishment of the airline was approved by the group in 1969. The airline aimed at a charter market with aircraft in the 50-seats range, and perhaps securing the rights to fly regional schedules to small domestic airports. To secure an organization already running, Maersk bought Falck Air on 21 February 1969 from the Falck Group. At that time Falck Air operated a fleet of two de Havilland Herons and two Hawker Siddeley HS 748s aircraft and had a hangar at Copenhagen Airport, Kastrup. The Herons allowed Maersk to commence services from Copenhagen to Stauning Airport, a route taken over from Cimber Air. Meanwhile, the airline had ordered three Fokker F27 Friendships, the first which was delivered on 9 December. Operations to Odense Airport commenced on 26 December.

The new airline, Maersk Air I/S was officially incorporated on 1 January 1970. The same day it took over the assets in Falck Air along with its air operator's certificate (AOC), concessions and the operational management of the HS-125. The initial scheduled operations consisted of five daily trip pairs from Copenhagen to Odense Airport, and two daily pairs to Stauning Airport. Norwegian-American Finn Rassmussen Ryssdal was hired as the airline's first director. He held the position for two years until he was replaced by another Norwegian, Johan Paus, former CEO of Scanair. As part of the build up, Maersk entered the travel agency industry. Originally named Maersk Air Rejsebureau, was later named Maersk Travel.

=== Initial operations ===
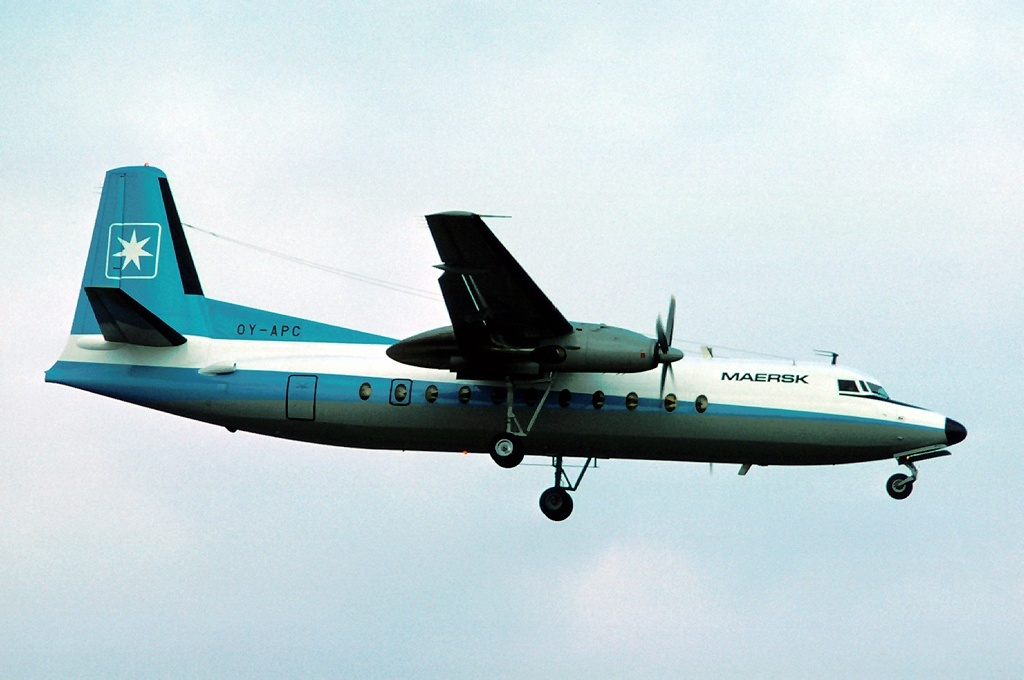
A Fokker F27 in 1976

The assignement of domestic routes was a contentious political issue. SAS held the privilege to commence any route they wanted, but lacked regional partner airlines to link the smaller airports. the situation was complicated by alternative domestic airlines in Norway and Sweden, Braathens SAFE and Linjeflyg, respectively. Danish authorities, therefore, asked the three scheduled carriers, SAS, Maersk, and Cimber, to negotiate and reach an agreement. This was reached in November 1971, whereby the joint consortium company Danair was established. Flights to Vágar Airport on the Faroe Islands commenced in 1971. Thisted Airport opened in 1971 and Maersk was selected as the operator. The Thisted and Stauning services were transferred to Cimber Air in 1976, although Maersk continued to operate some services.

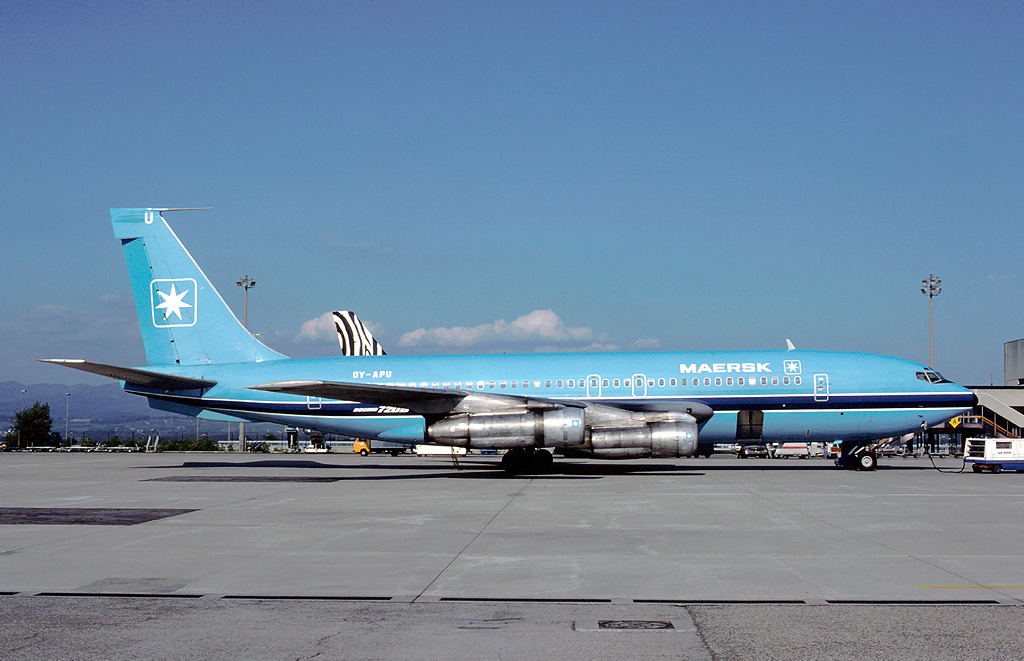
A Boeing 720B in 1980

Maersk also aimed at the inclusive tours charter market. To gain better access to the market, in December 1971 Maersk bought two travel agencies, Raffels Rejser and Bangs Rejser. This was followed up by the purchase of Unisol in 1974 and the three were merged to form a new agency under Unisol brand and an estimate of 120,000 annual trips. After having lost 100 million Danish krone (DKK) by 1979, Unison was sold to Tjæreborg in 1980. A collateral cause was Unisol's inability to profile itself in a market dominated by two high-profile, yet diametrical, owners. To better serve the market, Maersk Air bought five used Boeing 720Bs in 1973. The destinations were typical of Scandinavian customers: Spain, the Balearic Islands, and the Canary Islands. But also Cyprus, Crete, Malta, and Tunisia. Boeings also flew for other carriers, including fellow airline Conair. During the second half of the 1970s, Maersk focused on wet leasing their aircraft to international customers. Contracts included flying pilgrims from Morocco to Mecca and Scandinavians to North America.

Maersk Air was contracted by Maersk Oil to operate to the latter's oil fields in the North Sea. For this purpose, Maersk Air bought two Bell 212 helicopters. The airline stationed these at Esbjerg Airport and they commenced operations on 1 July 1975.

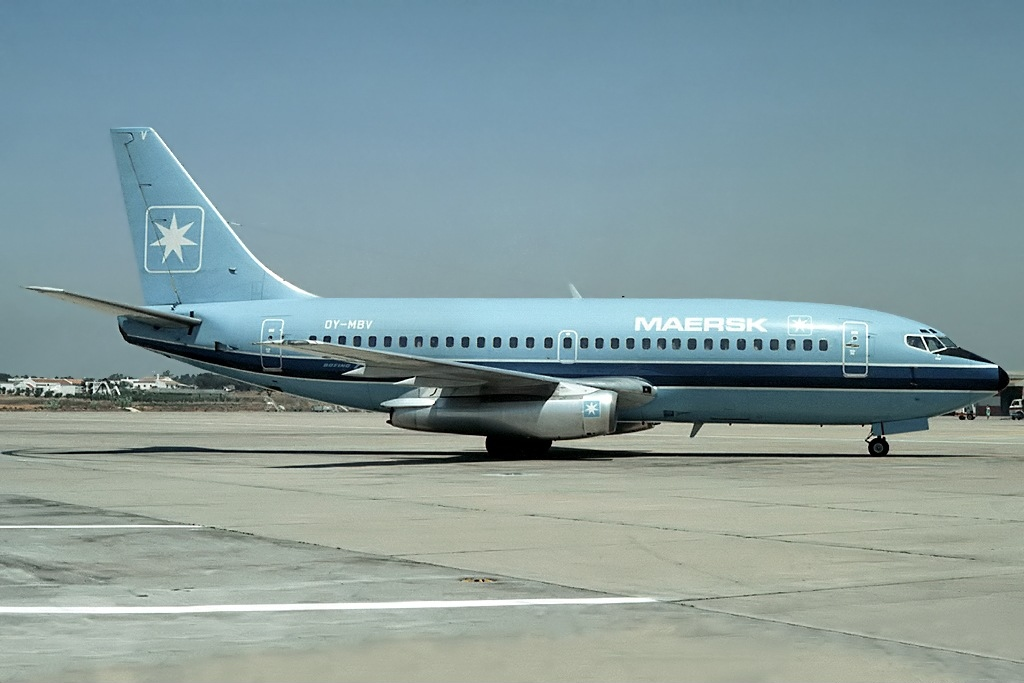
Boeing 737-200 Advanced at Faro Airport in 1985

=== Stabilization with jetliners ===
Maersk Air took delivery of its first two Boeing 737-200 Advanced in 1976 and by 1981 the airline had 14 in the fleet. Most of them were used for charters, mostly for Danish inclusive tour operators. This was a highly competitive market, where Maersk had to compete with Conair, Sterling and Scanair, amongst others. From 1983 three aircraft were entirely dedicated to this task. Some B737s were leased to other carriers, including Guyana Airways, Malaysia Airlines and Tunisair. The 737-200s proved too big for domestic services. The F27s had been sold and the airline, therefore, determined that it needed to buy new turboprops. A decision was made to buy the de Havilland Dash 7. In the meantime, the airline leased three HS 748s from 1980 to 1981. The first Dash 7 entered revenue service on 13 May 1981.

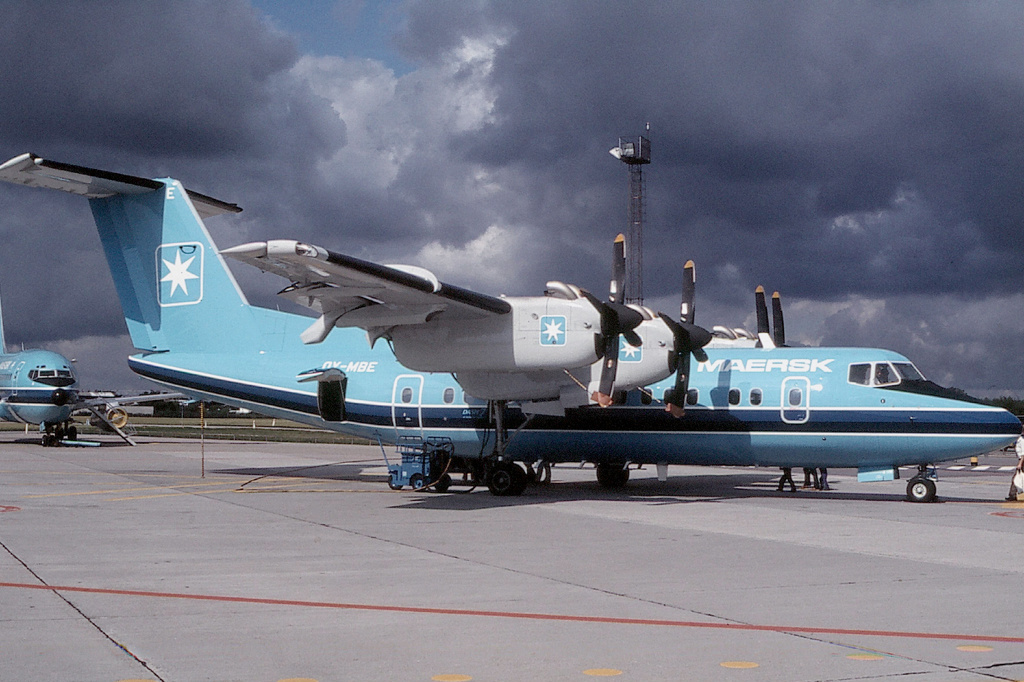
de Havilland Canada DHC-7 Dash 7 in 1982

=== The challenges of the 80s ===
Maersk Air experienced declining profits at during the late 1970s. The revenue of DKK 535 million in 1979 fell to DKK 454 million in 1981, hitting a record loss of DKK 29 million in 1981. The company started having problems with liquidity and in 1981 was not able to pay wages to its employees. In that same year Bjarne Hansen was hired as CEO. The number of bases for charter operations was reduced, cutting personnel costs. The two Beechcrafts were sold, as were nine other of the airline's twenty-four light aircraft. A key part of this plan was not allowing the aircraft to remain idle during the day, thus maximizing revenue. The number of employees were reduced from 720 to 480. By 1985 the revenue had risen to DKK 898 million in 1985, allowing the airline to make a profit of DKK 112 million in 1985.

From 1981 Maersk Air started flying a Bell 212 under contract with the Cabinet of the Faroe Islands. By then the helicopter fleet had reached five Bell 212s. From 1983 the petroleum activity increased and two larger Eurocopter AS332 Super Pumas were in operation.

From 27 September 1982 Danair 38%% subsidiary was reorganized. SAS's routes to Aalborg, Aarhus, and Rønne were transferred to the pooled airline. On its side Maersk increased the number of departures on its services. The goal was to improve profitability. And although the scheme did increase passenger numbers, it failed to improve Maersk Air's financial performance in the domestic market. From 1 January 1983 Stauning was dropped from Maersk and Danair's schedules. From 1988 Maersk Air saw competition on its scheduled service to the Faroes because of the establishment of the local Atlantic Airways.

=== Domestic and international expansion ===
Maersk explored the possibilities to fly international routes. The first non-SAS international concession dated back to 1981 and granted to Air Business scheduled flight from Esbjerg via Thistedt to Stavanger Airport, Sola in Norway, using an Embraer EMB-110 Bandeirante. Maersk Air bought the company in 1984 together with the two Short 360s and renamed it Maersk Commuter I.S. in 1988. Soon the concession changed and the tiny airline was allowed to operate from Aalborg instead of Thistedt, a market with better passenger potential. The subsidiary was fully integrated in April 1990.

Changes in European Community rules in 1984 allowed any carrier to operate intra-European routes, provided that two regional airports were connected. Maersk focused on Billund airport, which was centrally located in Jutland and was classified as a regional airport. It was already a popular base for charter flights. London was a favorite destination, but all its four main airports were all categorized as "primary". To exploit the new opportunities, Maersk turned to the neglected London Southend Airport, which was classified as a secondary airport. The airline inaugurated the route on 29 November 1984 with two round trips, using Dash 7s. Given the distance from the city Maersk could only market the destination as "London" if they included an onwards train ticket. The route recorded about 12,000 passengers annually and failed to make a profit.

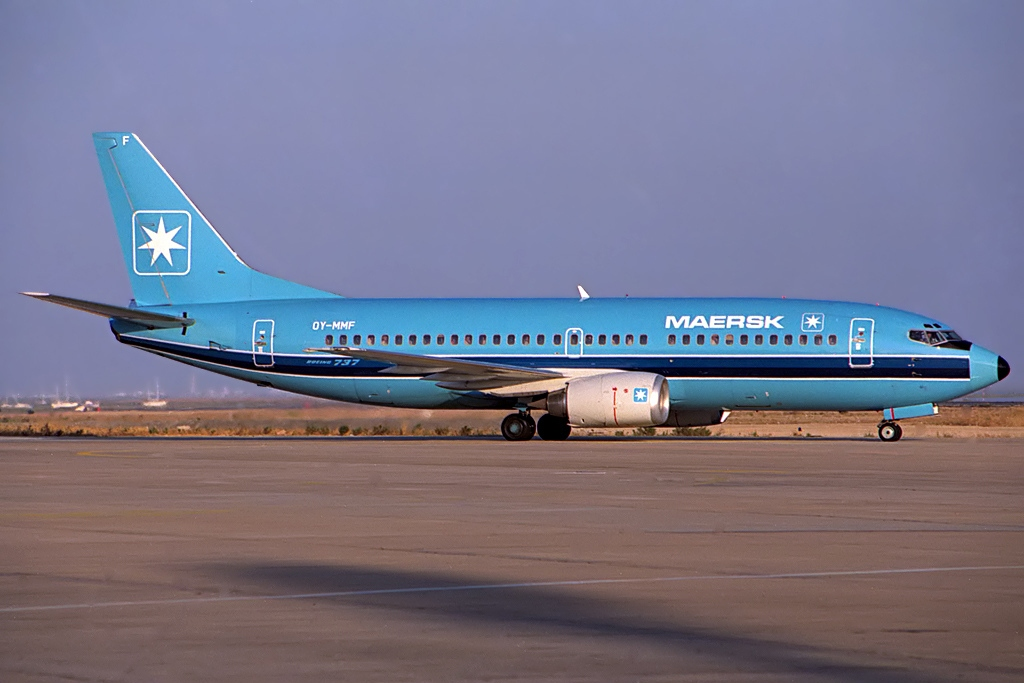
Boeing 737-300 at Faro Airport in 1986

Maersk considered both Århus and Billund as the base for their Jutland operations, and settled for Billund. The next international route to be inaugurated was to Cologne Bonn Airport in Germany in 1988, in cooperation with Lufthansa. It was flown with the Fokker 50, which had just started service with the airline. During the late 1980s Maersk Air favored the expansion of its travel agencies, both domestically and abroad.

Based on the need to replace the 737-200s, Boeing developed the shortened 737-500 on the request of Maersk and others airlines. Maersk took delivery of its first dash 500 on 6 April 1990, the year the air carrier was free to compete on any intra-European international route. Using the new aircraft, it focused on routes from and to Billund, offering flights to Amsterdam Airport Schiphol, Brussels Airport, London Gatwick Airport, Stockholm Arlanda Airport and Stavanger. In addition it flew from Copenhagen to London.

=== New subsidiaries, at home and abroad ===
Maersk Air Cargo, which until then had only been a handling agent, was established in 1982 changing the corporate name to its subsidiary Star Air. In fact Maersk Air was barred from operating a cargo fleet until deregulation in 1987. The freight subsidiary inherited a fleet of Fokker F27-600s. From 1993 it acquired a fleet of Boeing 727-100s and started flying for United Parcel Service.

Maersk Air also decided to enter the British market. It bought part of the Plimsoll Line, which in turn bought Birmingham Executive Airways (BEA) and Brymon Airways. After a merger as Brymon European Airways and subsequent demerger, Maersk Air UK was founded on the assets of BEA. It operated a series of international and domestic services out of Birmingham Airport, initially with a fleet of three Jetstream 31 and three BAC One-Elevens. Maersk signed a franchise agreement by virtue of which Maersk Air UK would fly with British Airways livery and flight codes, but at their own expense and with their own aircraft and crew. In 1996 the 1-11s were replaced by Boeing 737-500s. Bombardier CRJ200s were introduced two years later.

Maersk also secured a 49% stake in Estonian Air, after having beaten SAS in a privatization tender. Two of Maersk Air's Fokker 50s were leased to Estonian Air, who also took delivery of two 737-500s, replacing the old fleet of Soviet origin.

=== Danish deregulation ===
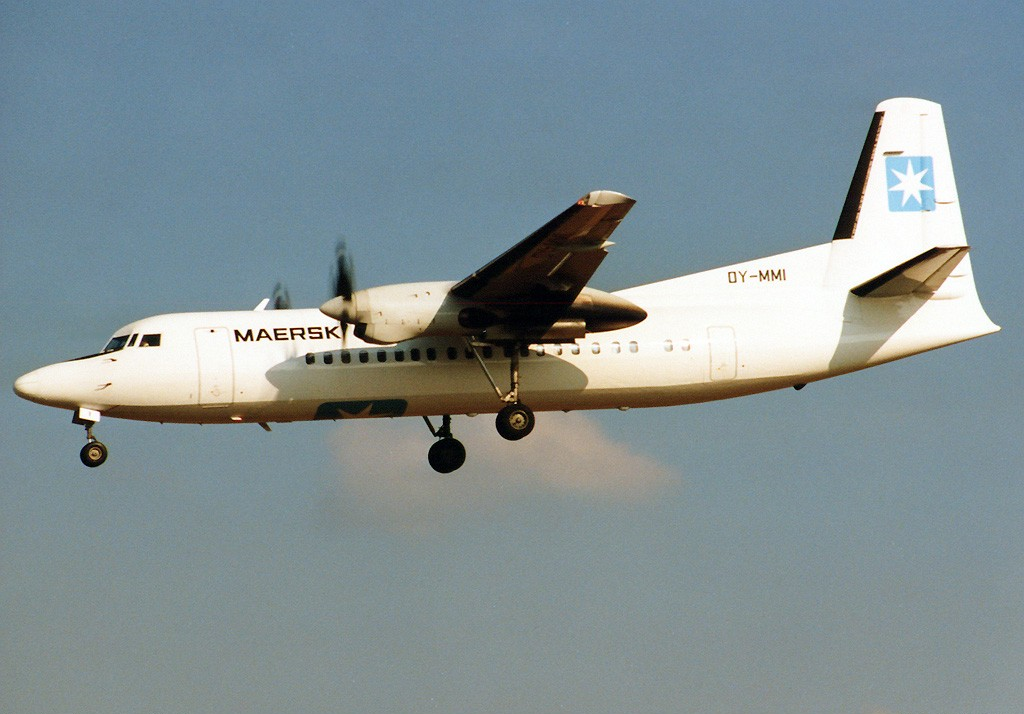
Fokker 50, 1996

In the early 1990s, the outlook was encouraging: 700,000 passengers on domestic routes, 150,000 on international routes, and 350,000 on charter flights. Furthermore, the second European Community liberalization package came into force in 1992. The benefits were immediately visible: when SAS abandoned its flight to London Gatwick Airport, Maersk immediately took over and increased flights from Billund to Amsterdam, Brussels, London (36 weekly flights, 16 of which to Copenhagen), and Stockholm. Billund, perhaps best known for its Lego headquarters, has a potential market of 1.5-2 million people living within a 90-kilometer radius from the airport. The third package allowed flights between any airport in the EU. Maersk Air began services from Billund to Frankfurt in 1993, and a year later it started flights from Copenhagen to Kristiansand. To meet the deregulation, Maersk carried out a major fleet reshape in 1993. The airline sold the Fokker 50s and leased them back. Meanwhile, it procured six Boeing 737-500s, which were delivered in 1996 and put at work on all most important routes.

Unlike Cimber Air, Maersk initially declined to participate in SAS' frequent-flyer program, EuroBonus, which was founded in 1992. With the demise of Danair, Maersk Air focused on improving its international links. Its primary strategy was to establish routes from Billund to European destinations with codeshare agreements with major European airlines. Gradually the services were upgraded from Fokker 50 to Boeing 737-500s. Danair was dissolved on 1 October 1995, when the domestic airline industry in Denmark was deregulated.

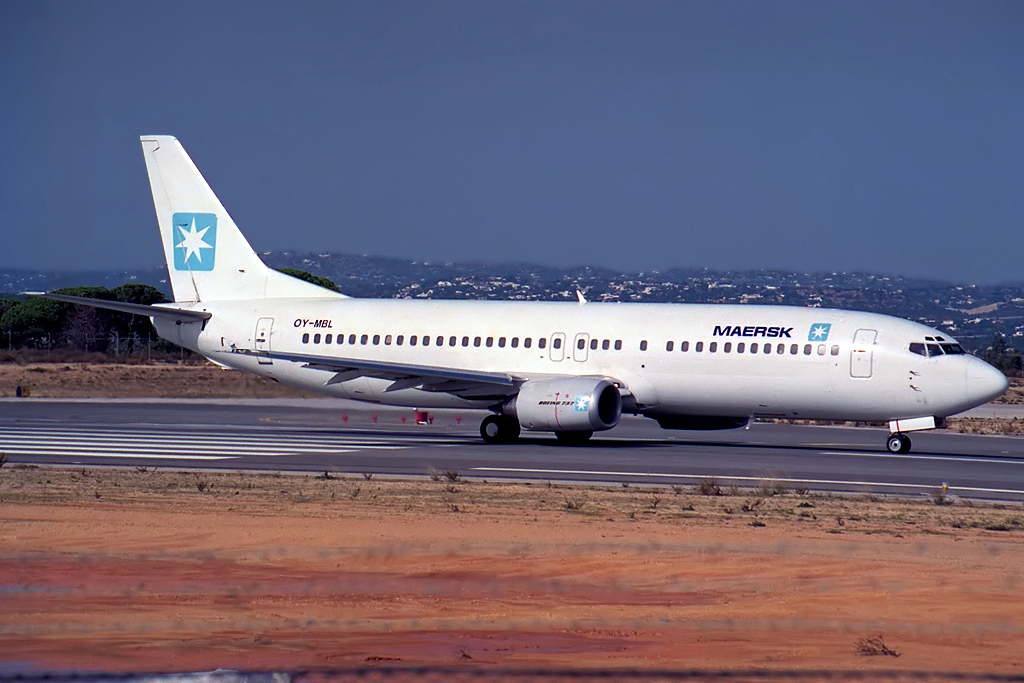
Boeing 737-400 at Faro Airport in 1992

Maersk's success in Jutland was noticed by SAS, which in October 1996 opened its first route out of Billund, to Frankfurt. This was the first time in which the two airlines competed head to head. In response, in the following year Maersk Air launched services out of SAS' stronghold at Copenhagen Airport to Milan, Geneva and Stockholm. Additional routes out of Billund were added in 1997. Flemming Knudsen took the position as CEO on 12 January 1998. On 3 March the first 737-700 was delivered, with Maersk Air being the European launch customer. With its eight daily round trips, Maersk Air only captured 10% of the market on the Copenhagen–Stockholm route, losing money on it. Maersk, therefore, started negotiations with British Airways and KLM to see if they could become part of an airline alliance. They were in close negotiations with what would become Oneworld, but pulled out in the last minute.

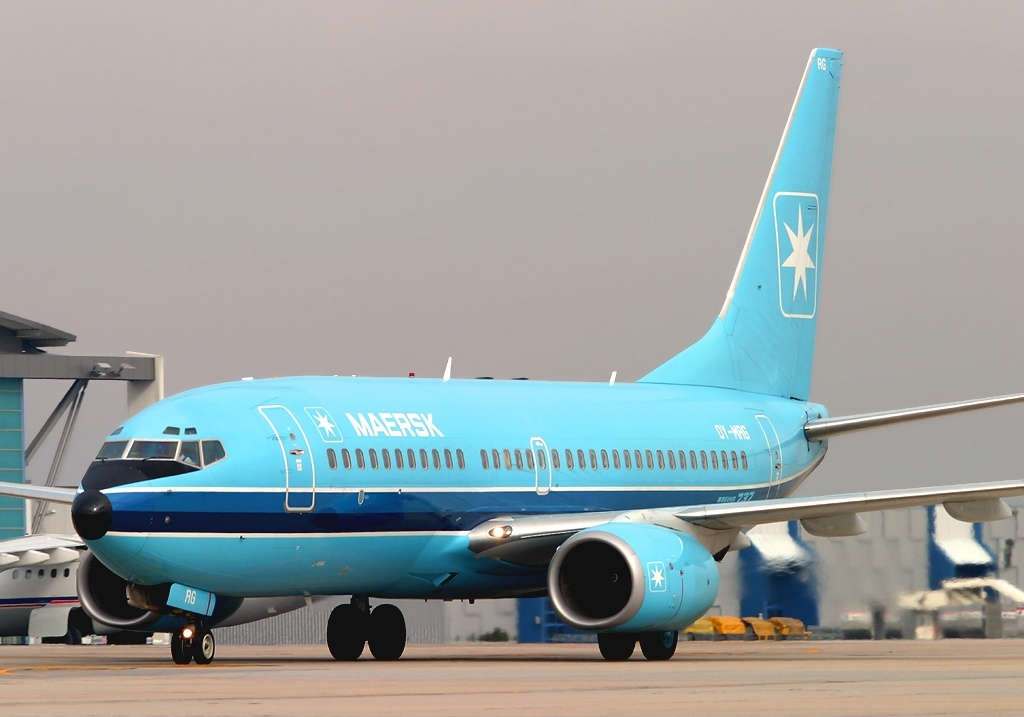
Boeing 737-700 at Stuttgart Airport 2004

With the 14 June 1998 opening of the Great Belt Fixed Link, car, coach and rail transport became faster between Jutland and Funen on one side, and Zealand on the other, cutting travel time by an hour. This had an effect on patronage, with a significant drop in domestic traffic. The same year the government introduced a domestic air tax of DKK 150 on all domestic flights, which further contributed to the fall in domestic leadership. Maersk Air anticipated a significant drop and scaled down services from a 737-500 to a Fokker 50. Yet passenger numbers dropped by 1/3 and the service was terminated on 13 June 1998. Ole Dietz took over as managing director on 1 March 1999.

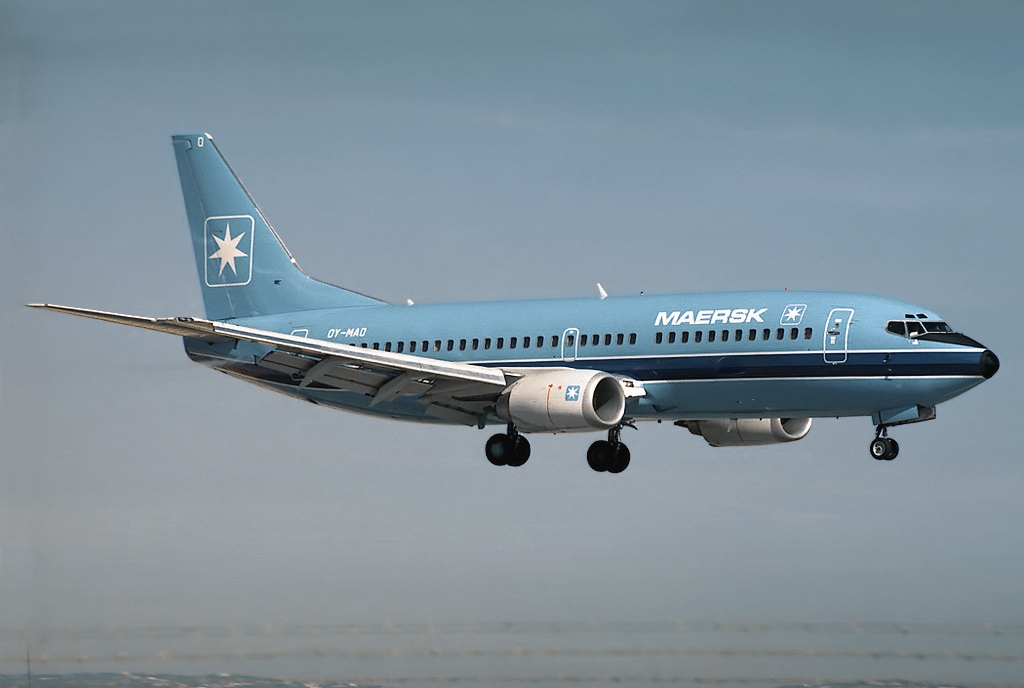
Boeing 737-300

After the Oneworld negotiations failed, Maersk Air turned to SAS in an attempt to start a cooperation. Negotiations commenced in early 1997, and the deal was announced on 8 October 1998, and took effect 28 March of the following year. Maersk would adopt EuroBonus and codeshare all domestic flights, flights out of Copenhagen and selected Billund services. In addition to the publicly stated clauses, the agreement also contained a series of illegal collusions. Maersk and SAS split up the market between them, so they no longer would fly in competition. This meant that Maersk Air would stop flights from Copenhagen to Stockholm and Geneva. Maersk Air also agreed to — gradually so to not awake suspicion — withdraw from its various codeshare agreements with other airlines than SAS. The case was followed up by the EU Commission and the Danish authorities, which carried out a dawn raid on 15 June 2000. Maersk Air was sentenced to a fine of €17.5 million, while SAS was fined €43.75 million. As a consequence, Dietz resigned as CEO and Hansen, who had been appointed chairman, also withdrew. Flemming Ipsen was hired as a new CEO, while Troels Dilling was hired as chairman.

=== Decline ===
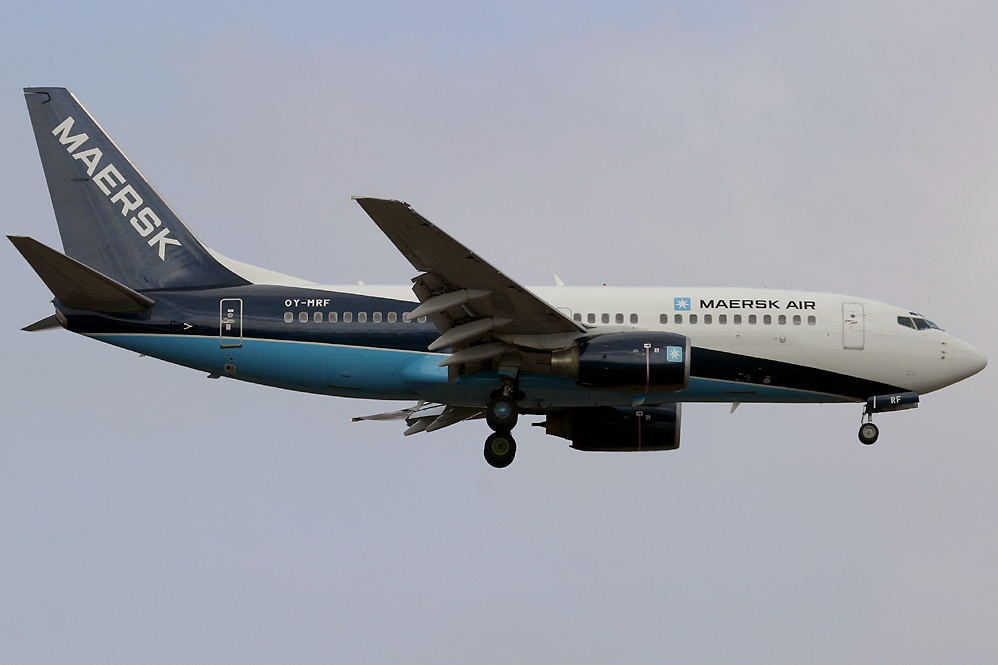
A Boeing 737-700 in the last livery

Maersk was affected by a series of labor disputes in 1998 and 1999. At the turn of the century Maersk Air fell into financial distress. The airline was hit hard by the 2001 airline recession, making a loss that year of DKK 341 million. Leadership increased in 2002, largely through the increased sale of discounted tickets. Maersk Air therefore turned to divest its non-core activities. Estonian Air was sold to SAS in 2003. The British subsidiary lost an accumulative DKK 325 million from 2000 through 2002. The company was therefore sold in a management buyout in 2003, the airline becoming Duo Airways.

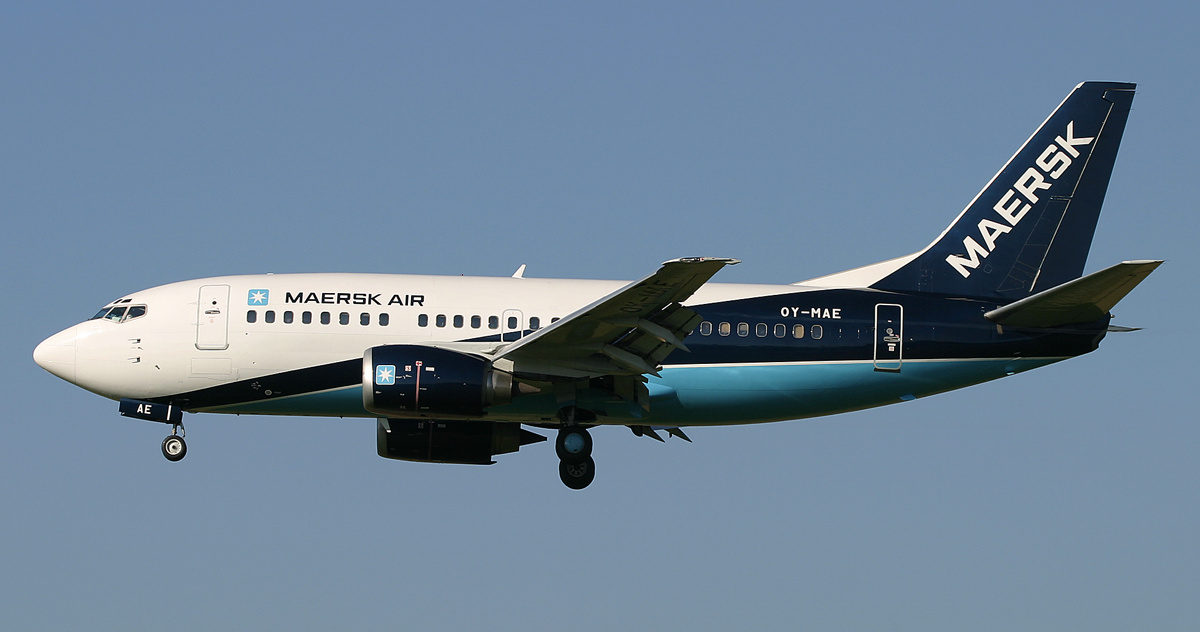
Boeing 737-500

The Maersk Group was forced to issue more than DKK 700 million in the airline from 2002 to 2005. In late 2003 the Maersk Aircraft A/S was established to own the fleet, spurring speculation in the media that the group was planning to liquidate the operational company. The year gave a net loss of DKK 841 million. In the years following the cartel case, almost the entire executive management of the airline was replaced. A large portion of the new management was without experience in the aviation industry. On 1 November 2003 Ipsen was replaced as CEO by Finn Øelund, who came from the same position in Air Greenland. He devised a new strategy, in which the airline would better utilize its fleet by placing flights closer to each other and flying throughout the day. He also proposed competing head-on with SAS, as he believed that Maersk Air with the new strategy could operate with lower costs than the tri-national consortium airline. Aircraft received a new white and dark blue livery, replacing the old light-blue Maersk colors. The airline adopted the slogan "fly as you like" and focused its route expansion on typical holiday destinations and cheap fares.

Since 2002 Maersk had seen competition in the scheduled market from Sterling Airways, which had reorganized itself as a low-cost carrier targeting the Mediterranean leisure market. In 2005 Fred. Olsen & Co. sold the airline to FL Group. The Maersk Group announced on 30 June 2005 that it would sell Maersk Air to Sterling. Maersk Air Cargo and the corporate aircraft were kept out of the deal. Ownership of the Boeing 737s was also not included, and instead, there were leased to Sterling. The sale price of Maersk Air was never made public and the assets were merged to form Sterling Airlines on 13 September.

== Operations ==
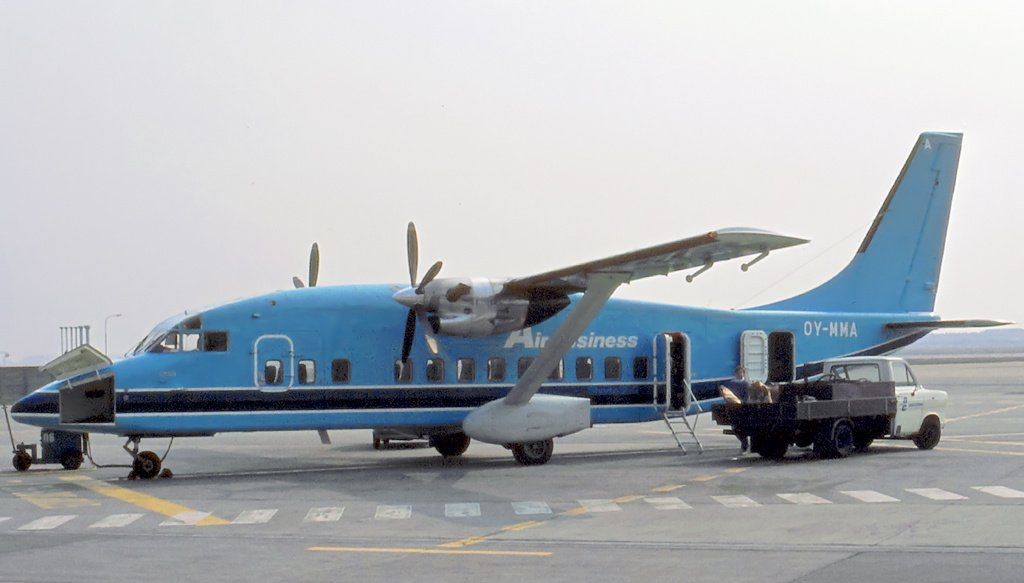
Short 360 of Air Business at Copenhagen Airport in 1984

Maersk Air I/S was until 1996 organized as a partnership (interessentskab), which was again owned by two subsidiaries within the Maersk Group. This allowed the company to report less detailed accounts, and hindered competitors from gaining as good a picture of the company's economic situation. Maersk Air I/S was reorganized in 1996. The partnership model was abandoned and instead, the airline became a limited company (aktieselskab) directly under the mother company. Star Air on its side became a subsidiary of Maersk Air.

Half of Maersk Air's accumulative profits came from the sale of used aircraft. Inspired form the importance of crucial timing of purchase and sale of ships, Maersk Air made several advantages deals. One of the involved selling 737-200s at a higher price than they had paid for them. Maersk was an early customer of the Fokker 50, of which the first was delivered in 1988. As part of the purchase agreement, they would receive DKK one million per sold aircraft in the Nordic Counties. This turned out well as SAS and Braathens SAFE bought a combined twenty units.

From 1974 to 1999 Maersk Air operated a helicopter division out of Esbjerg Airport. These were contracted by Maersk Oil, which operated offshore oil platforms in the North Sea.

Throughout its existence, Maersk Air operated a corporate jet for the Maersk Group. Five different aircraft were used in series, first consisting of two Hawker Siddeley HS 125, since 1997 opting for a Bombardier Challenger 600. These were all named Jette Maersk and served two purposes. First, they were used for flying executives. Secondly, the aircraft were dispatched to send mechanics and spare parts of serve ships of Maersk Line and other shipping companies within the group. Because this could minimize downtime due to mechanical failure, the latter proved a highly profitable endeavor.

=== Ground handling ===
Initially, Maersk and the other major Danish airlines had a common ground handling company, Copenhagen Air Services, at the eponymous airport. In 1994 Maersk Air bought out the other owners of Copenhagen Air Services. Within three years it was making a DKK 46-million profit from a DKK 401-million revenue. In 1998 Maersk merged the company with the ground handling company owned by the Swedish Civil Aviation Administration, creating Novia. It operated ground handling services at the airports in Copenhagen, Stockholm-Arlanda and Gothenburg-Landvetter.

With the deregulation of the handling market from 1999, entranced with lower costs took over a substantial portion of the market. Novia failed to retain its profits and lost DKK 80 million from 1999 to 2001. The CAA sold to Aviapartner in 2001, but the cooperation was poor. Maersk Air eventually let the company be file for bankruptcy.

=== Subsidiary airlines ===
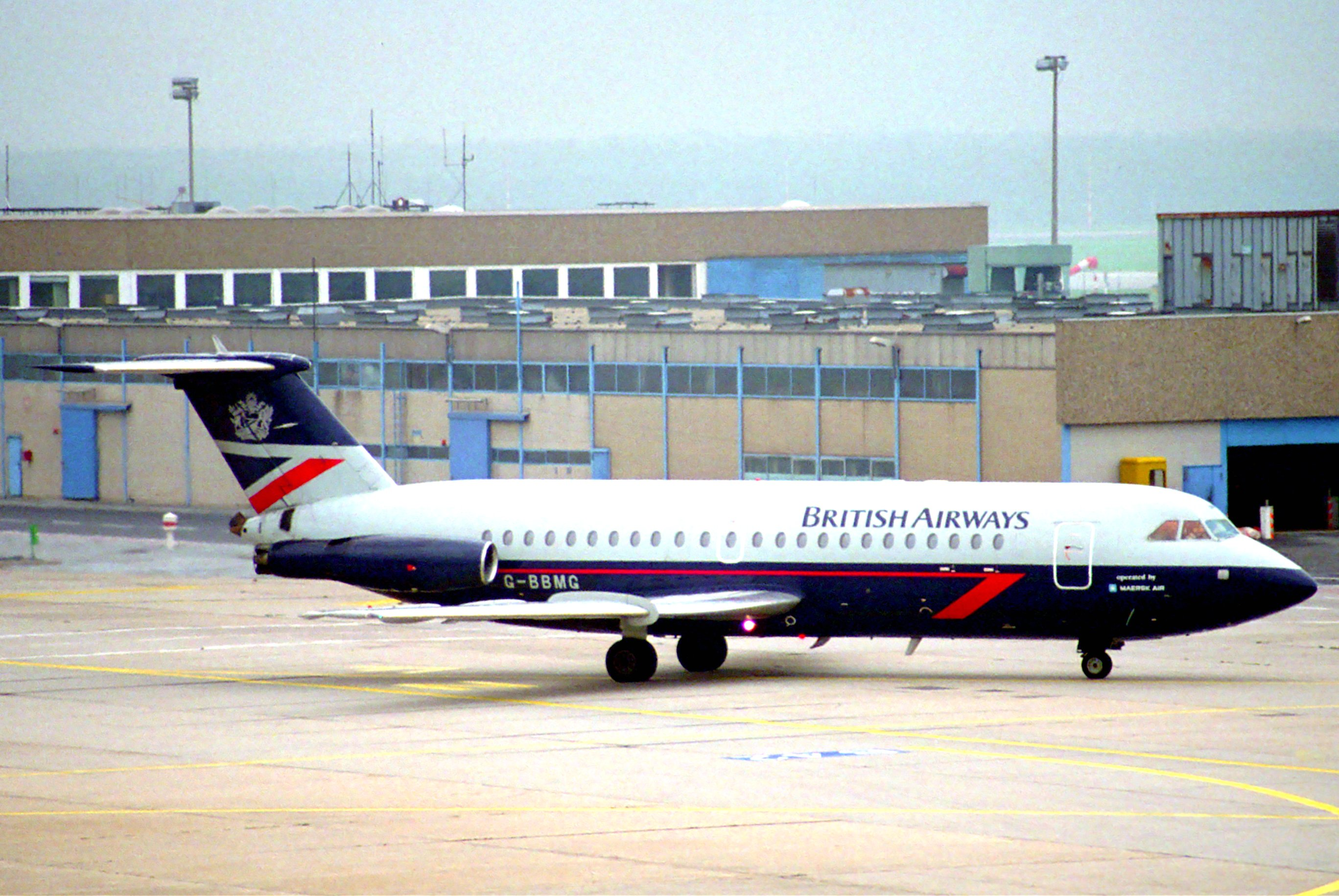
BAC One-Eleven of Maersk Air UK

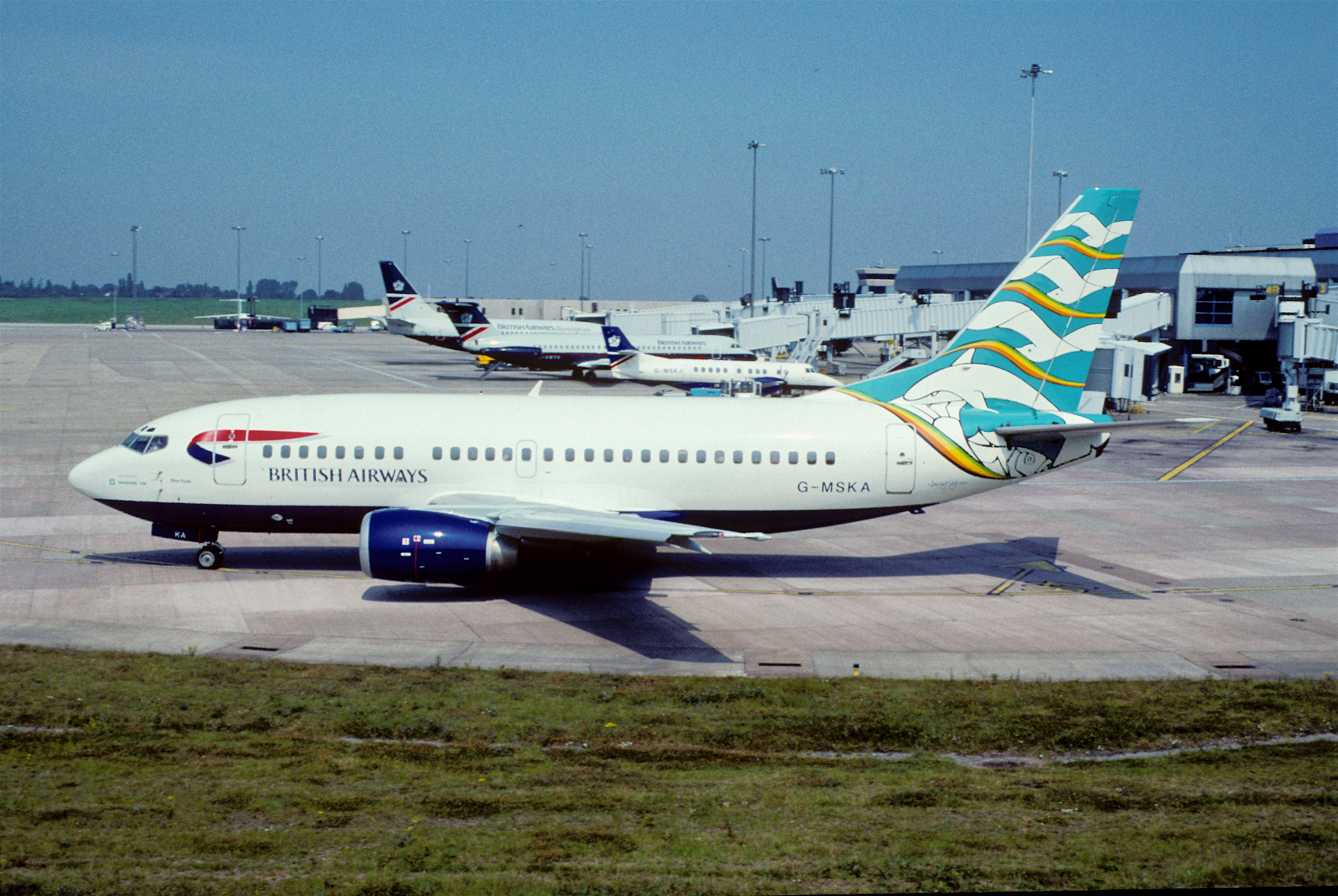
Maersk Air UK Boeing 737-500 in British Airways ethnic livery at Birmingham Airport

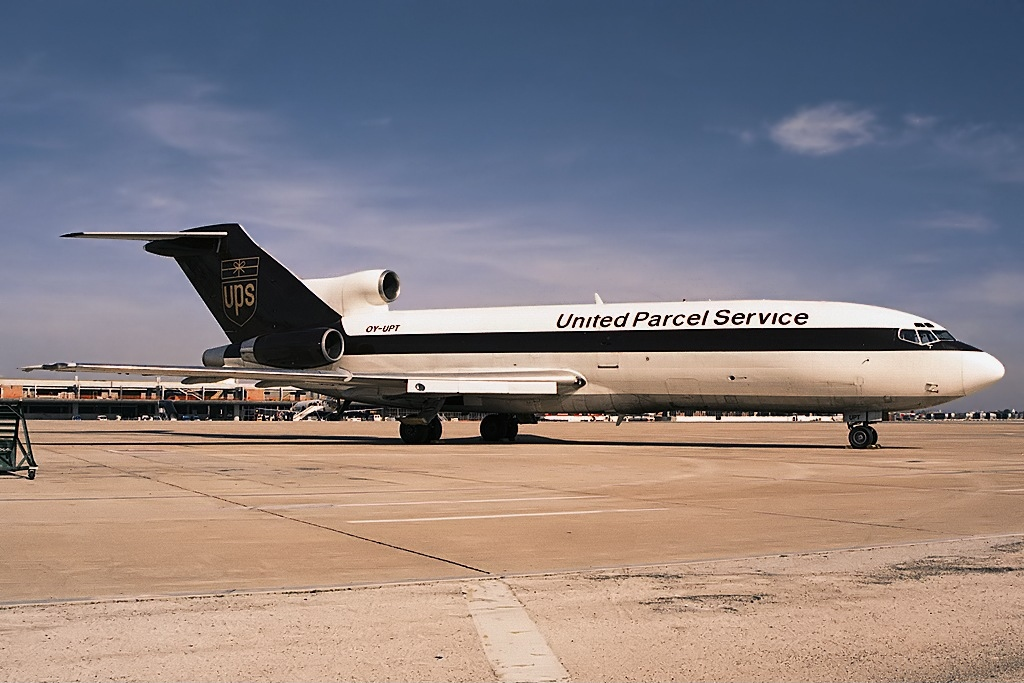
Boeing 727-100 of Star Air operating for UPS

- Danair. SAS held a 51% share of the company, while Maersk had 34% and Cimber Air a 15%. Initially, it was to organize domestic flights and in the long run become a separate operator. Danair bought services from the three airlines, who retained flights to their respective destinations. Then Danair would set prices and sell tickets on the flights and the profits were paid out in relation to the ownership shares. The airlines were paid a fixed price, irrespective of their actual operating costs.
- Maersk Commuter, previously Air Business, was based at Esbjerg Airport and operated as a subsidiary of Maersk Air between 1984 and 1990. It flew a single route, from Esbjerg via Aalborg to Stavanger. It operated a fleet of two Short 360s.
- Maersk Air UK operated in the United Kingdom between 1993 and 2003. It operated under a franchise agreement with British Airways with its base at Birmingham Airport. It employed the BA branding, including aircraft livery, uniforms, in-flight service, and catering, as well as terminal services. It also employed BA's flight codes and reservation system. Flights qualified for miles on BA's frequent-flyer program, Executive Club.
- Star Air was from 1996 to 2004 a cargo airline subsidiary of Maersk Air. It operated a fleet of cargo jetliners, notably the Boeing 727 and Boeing 757, on long-term contracts with United Parcel Service. These operations were based in UPS's main European hub at Cologne Bonn Airport in Germany.
- A 49-percent stake in Estonian Air was owned by Maersk Air between 1996 and 2003. The flag carrier of Estonia was based at Tallinn Airport and flew a limited international network, using a combination of Boeing 737-500s and Fokker 50s.

=== Travel agencies ===
As part of the establishment, Maersk entered the travel agency industry. Originally named Maersk Air Rejsebureau, this department was later named Maersk Travel. It bought Expert Rejser in 1987 and established international agencies in London, Hong Kong, and Singapore. It gradually built up a nationwide network of travel agency outlets, in Ålborg, Århus, Copenhagen, Esbjerg, Herning, Horsens, Odense and Skive. In the following years it bought several smaller agencies and in 1990 entered a cooperation with DSB Rejsebureau. A common agency was established in Esbjerg and negotiations regarding a fusion were initiated. But both parent companies wanted to be the "locomotive" in the new company, and the deal fell through. Maersk Travel was merged with DFDS Travel in 1997, to create Maersk DFDS Travel. This proved a difficult process and Maersk pulled out of the new company in 1999.

Maersk also aimed at serving the inclusive tours charter market. To gain better access to the market, Maersk bought two travel agents in December 1971, Raffels Rejser and Bangs Rejser. This was followed up with purchasing Unisol in 1974 and the three were merged to form a new agency under the brand Unisol and 120,000 annual trips. Unisol—Denmark's third-largest inclusive tours travel agency—was placed under the industrial department in Maersk, while the airline reported directly to the executive administration. This caused a lack of coordination between the companies and Maersk never made money from the inclusive tours operations. After having lost 100 million Danish krone (DKK) by 1979, Unison was sold to Tjæreborg in 1980.

== Fleet ==
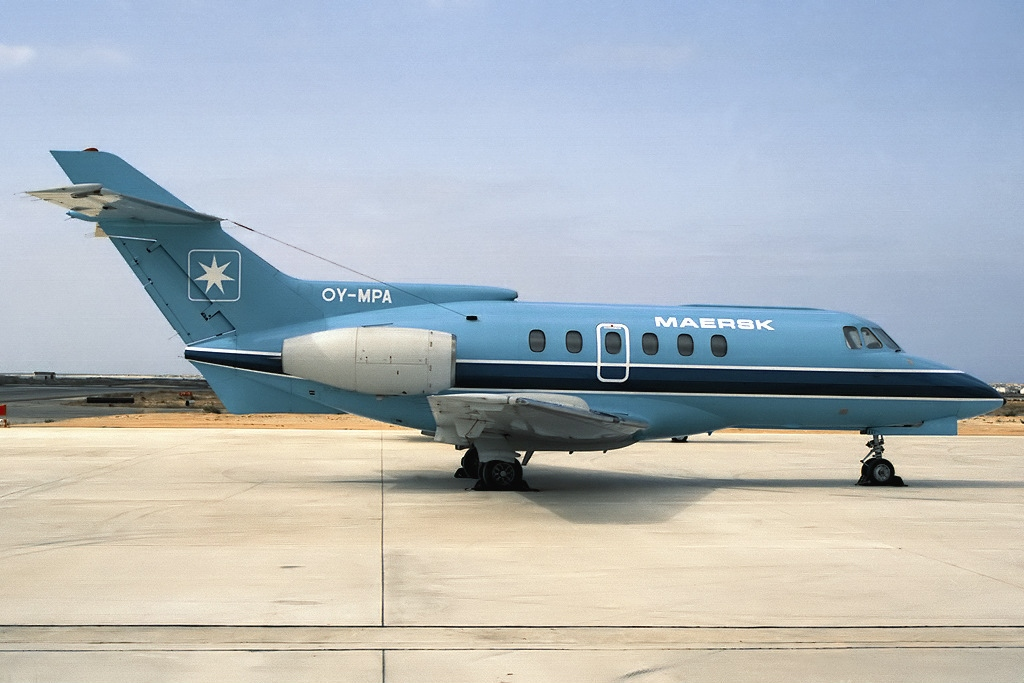
Hawker Siddeley HS 125 corporate jet

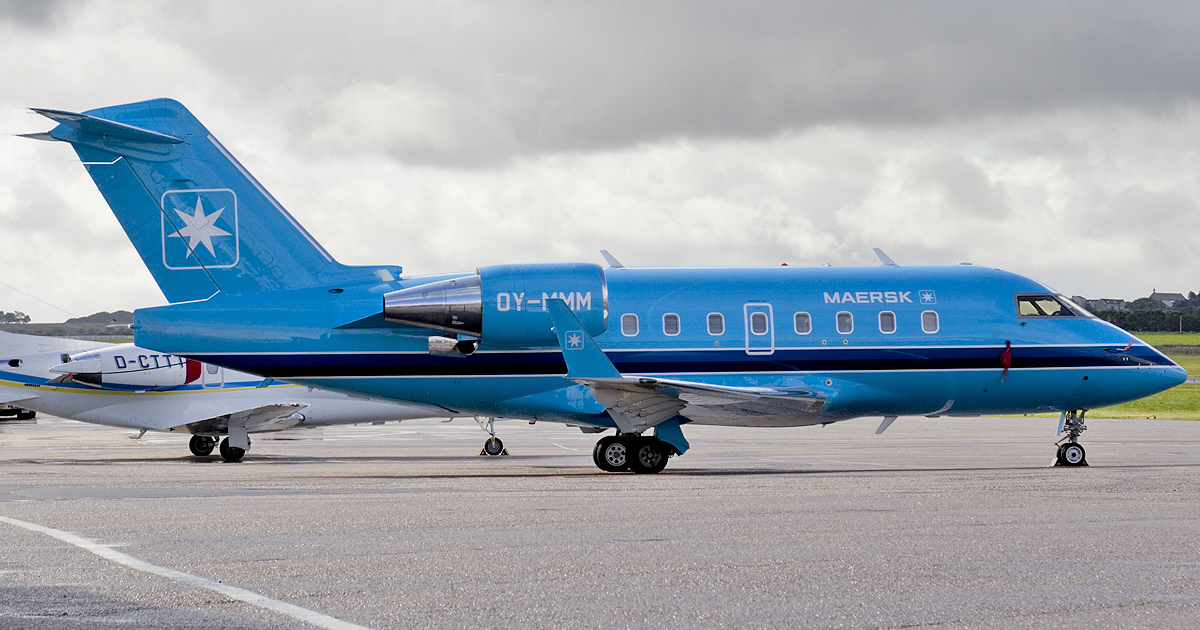
The final corporate jet, a Bombardier Challenger 600

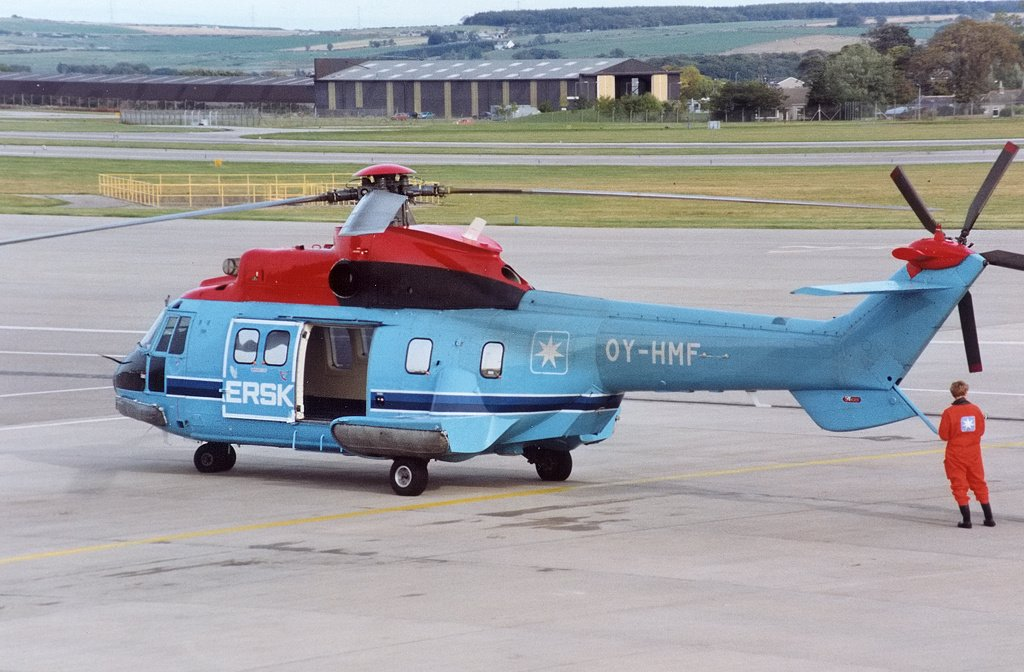
Eurocopter AS332 Super Puma at Aberdeen Airport in 1994

The following is a list of aircraft operated by Maersk Air, including its helicopter and corporate jet divisions. It excludes aircraft operated by Star Air, Maersk Commuter, and Maersk Air UK. The list consists of the total number of aircraft operated by the airline (although the peak number operated may be lower), the year the type was first introduced and the year the last aircraft was taken out of service.

Maersk Air aircraft
| Aircraft | Qty. | Intr. | Ret. | Ref. |
|---|---|---|---|---|
| Hawker Siddeley HS 125 | 3 | 1967 | 1985 | |
| de Havilland Heron | 2 | 1969 | 1970 | |
| Hawker Siddeley HS 748 | 5 | 1970 | 1981 | |
| Fokker F27-100 Friendship | 10 | 1969 | 1996 | |
| Boeing 720B | 5 | 1973 | 1981 | |
| Bell 212 | 5 | 1975 | 1993 | |
| Boeing 737-200 Advanced | 14 | 1976 | 1990 | |
| de Havilland Canada DHC-7 Dash 7-102 | 5 | 1981 | 1989 | |
| Eurocopter AS332 Super Puma | 5 | 1983 | 1999 | |
| Boeing 737-300 | 22 | 1985 | 1998 | |
| Eurocopter AS365 Dauphin | 2 | 1983 | 1999 | |
| Fokker 50 | 9 | 1988 | 2000 | |
| Boeing 737-400 | 3 | 1993 | 1996 | |
| Boeing 737-500 | 24 | 1990 | 2005 | |
| Bombardier Challenger 604 | 2 | 1997 | 2005 | |
| Boeing 737-700 | 15 | 1998 | 2005 | |
| Bombardier CRJ-200 | 11 | 1998 | 2004 | |

== Accidents and incidents ==
Maersk Air has been subject to three write-off accidents, of which one resulted in fatalities:

The first accident took place on 27 December 1969, ten days after the accident aircraft, a Fokker F27 with registration OY-APD, had been delivered to the airline. It was being used for training flight in poor weather conditions at Bornholm Airport. After carrying out a touch and go, the aircraft failed to stay airborne due to icing on the wings. It slid off the runway and into the Baltic Sea.

On 25 January 1975 the F27 OY-APB was carrying out a landing on a wet and icy runway at Vágar Airport. Without having been informed of the conditions, the pilots veered the aircraft off the runway and collided with terrain.

The fatal accident took place on 2 January 1984. A Bell 212 with registration OY-HMC crashed into the North Sea during a flight from Esbjerg Airport to an oil platform. There arose a breach in the steering system and the pilots lost control of the helicopter. This caused the aircraft to start to spin and the pilots to reduce speed to regain control. This caused a loss of height and eventually brought the helicopter to an emergency landing on the water. Both pilots and a passenger were killed in the crash.

== Bibliography ==
- Buraas, Anders (1972). Fly over fly: Historien om SAS (in Norwegian). Oslo: Gyldendal Norsk Forlag. ISBN 82-05-00891-4.
- Ellemose, Søren (2009). Luftens helte (in Danish). Aarhus: Jyllands-Posten Forlag. ISBN 978-87-7692-197-2.
