= List of British Midland International destinations =

This is a list of destinations that were served by British Midland International over its time as an airline. (Note: Services marked as having ended before the merger with British Airways are those that do not appear in the final timetable released by BMI, excluding Damascus and Lyon. Lyon appears in a BMI Regional route map dated 25 September 2012.) (Note: The indication "Merged into BA" means that the specific BMI route to that destination, not necessarily the destination itself, was absorbed into the British Airways network.)

On 28 October 2012, all remaining services were merged into British Airways (BA).

Country	City	Airport	Notes	Ref.
Antigua and Barbuda	St. John's	V. C. Bird International Airport	Terminated prior to BA merger	
Armenia	Yerevan	Zvartnots International Airport		
Austria	Vienna	Vienna International Airport	Merged into BA	
Azerbaijan	Baku	Heydar Aliyev International Airport	Merged into BA	
Barbados	Bridgetown	Grantley Adams International Airport	Terminated prior to BA merger	
Belgium	Brussels	Brussels Airport		
Canada	Toronto	Toronto Pearson International Airport	Terminated prior to BA merger	
Denmark	Copenhagen	Copenhagen Airport		
Denmark	Esbjerg	Esbjerg Airport		
Egypt	Cairo	Cairo International Airport	Merged into BA	
Ethiopia	Addis Ababa	Bole International Airport		
France	Lyon	Lyon–Saint-Exupéry Airport		
France	Mulhouse	EuroAirport Basel Mulhouse Freiburg	Merged into BA	
France	Nice	Nice Côte d'Azur Airport	Merged into BA	
France	Toulouse	Toulouse–Blagnac Airport	Terminated prior to BA merger	
Georgia	Tbilisi	Tbilisi International Airport	Merged into BA	
Germany	Berlin	Berlin Tegel Airport	Terminated prior to BA merger	
Germany	Cologne	Cologne Bonn Airport	Terminated prior to BA merger	
Germany	Düsseldorf	Düsseldorf Airport	Terminated prior to BA merger	
Germany	Frankfurt	Frankfurt Airport		
Germany	Freiburg	EuroAirport Basel Mulhouse Freiburg	Merged into BA	
Germany	Hamburg	Hamburg Airport	Terminated prior to BA merger	
Germany	Hanover	Hannover-Langenhagen Airport	Merged into BA	
Germany	Stuttgart	Stuttgart Airport	Terminated prior to BA merger	
India	Amritsar	Sri Guru Ram Dass Jee International Airport		
India	Mumbai	Chhatrapati Shivaji Maharaj International Airport	Terminated prior to BA merger	
Iran	Tehran	Tehran Imam Khomeini International Airport		
Ireland	Dublin	Dublin Airport	Merged into BA	
Israel	Tel Aviv	Ben Gurion Airport	Terminated prior to BA merger	
Italy	Naples	Naples International Airport	Terminated prior to BA merger	
Italy	Venice	Venice Marco Polo Airport	Terminated prior to BA merger	
Jordan	Amman	Queen Alia International Airport	Merged into BA	
Kazakhstan	Almaty	Almaty International Airport	Merged into BA	
Kyrgyzstan	Bishkek	Manas International Airport		
Lebanon	Beirut	Rafic Hariri International Airport	Merged into BA	
Libya	Tripoli	Tripoli International Airport	Merged into BA	
Morocco	Agadir	Agadir Airport	Merged into BA	
Morocco	Casablanca	Mohammed V International Airport		
Morocco	Marrakesh	Marrakesh Menara Airport	Merged into BA	
Netherlands	Amsterdam	Amsterdam Airport Schiphol	Terminated prior to BA merger	
Netherlands	Groningen	Groningen Airport Eelde		
Norway	Bergen	Bergen Airport	Merged into BA	
Norway	Stavanger	Stavanger Airport	Merged into BA	
Portugal	Faro	Faro Airport	Terminated prior to BA merger	
Russia	Moscow	Domodedovo International Airport	Merged into BA	
Russia	Yekaterinburg	Koltsovo Airport	Terminated prior to BA merger	
Saint Lucia	Vieux-Fort	Hewanorra International Airport	Terminated prior to BA merger	
Saudi Arabia	Dammam	King Fahad International Airport		
Saudi Arabia	Jeddah	King Abdul Aziz International Airport	Merged into BA	
Saudi Arabia	Riyadh	King Khalid International Airport	Merged into BA	
Senegal	Dakar	Léopold Sédar Senghor International Airport	Terminated prior to BA merger	
Sierra Leone	Freetown	Lungi International Airport	Merged into BA	
Spain	Alicante	Alicante–Elche Miguel Hernández Airport	Terminated prior to BA merger	
Spain	Barcelona	Josep Tarradellas Barcelona–El Prat Airport	Terminated prior to BA merger	
Spain	Madrid	Adolfo Suárez Madrid–Barajas Airport	Terminated prior to BA merger	
Spain	Málaga	Málaga Airport	Terminated prior to BA merger	
Spain	Palma de Mallorca	Palma de Mallorca Airport	Terminated prior to BA merger	
Sudan	Khartoum	Khartoum International Airport		
Switzerland	Basel	EuroAirport Basel Mulhouse Freiburg	Merged into BA	
Switzerland	Zurich	Zurich Airport		
Syria	Aleppo	Aleppo Airport	Terminated prior to BA merger	
Syria	Damascus	Damascus International Airport	Terminated prior to BA merger	
Turkey	Ankara	Esenboga International Airport	Terminated prior to BA merger	
Ukraine	Kyiv	Boryspil Airport	Terminated prior to BA merger	
United Kingdom	Aberdeen	Aberdeen Airport	Merged into BA	
United Kingdom	Belfast	George Best Belfast City Airport	Merged into BA	
United Kingdom	Birmingham	Birmingham Airport	Terminated prior to BA merger	
United Kingdom	Durham/Tees Valley	Teesside International Airport	Terminated prior to BA merger	
United Kingdom	East Midlands	East Midlands Airport		
United Kingdom	Edinburgh	Edinburgh Airport	Merged into BA	
United Kingdom	Glasgow	Glasgow Airport		
United Kingdom	Inverness	Inverness Airport	Terminated prior to BA merger	
United Kingdom	Jersey	Jersey Airport	Terminated prior to BA merger	
United Kingdom	Leeds	Leeds Bradford Airport		
United Kingdom	London	Heathrow Airport	Merged into BA	
United Kingdom	London	London Stansted Airport	Terminated prior to BA merger	
United Kingdom	Manchester	Manchester Airport	Main Hub for long haul until March 2008 Merged into BA	
United Kingdom	Norwich	Norwich Airport		
United States	Chicago	O'Hare International Airport	Terminated prior to BA merger	
United States	Las Vegas	McCarran International Airport	Terminated prior to BA merger	
United States	Washington, D.C.	Washington Dulles International Airport	Terminated prior to BA merger	

== See also ==
- bmibaby
- BMI Regional
