= EKEB =

Ekeb or EKEB may refer to:

- Eikev, the 46th weekly parshah or portion in the annual Jewish cycle of Torah reading and the third in the book of Deuteronomy
- Esbjerg Airport, near Esbjerg, Denmark (ICAO airport code)
