= Maersk Air Cargo =

Cargo airline of Denmark

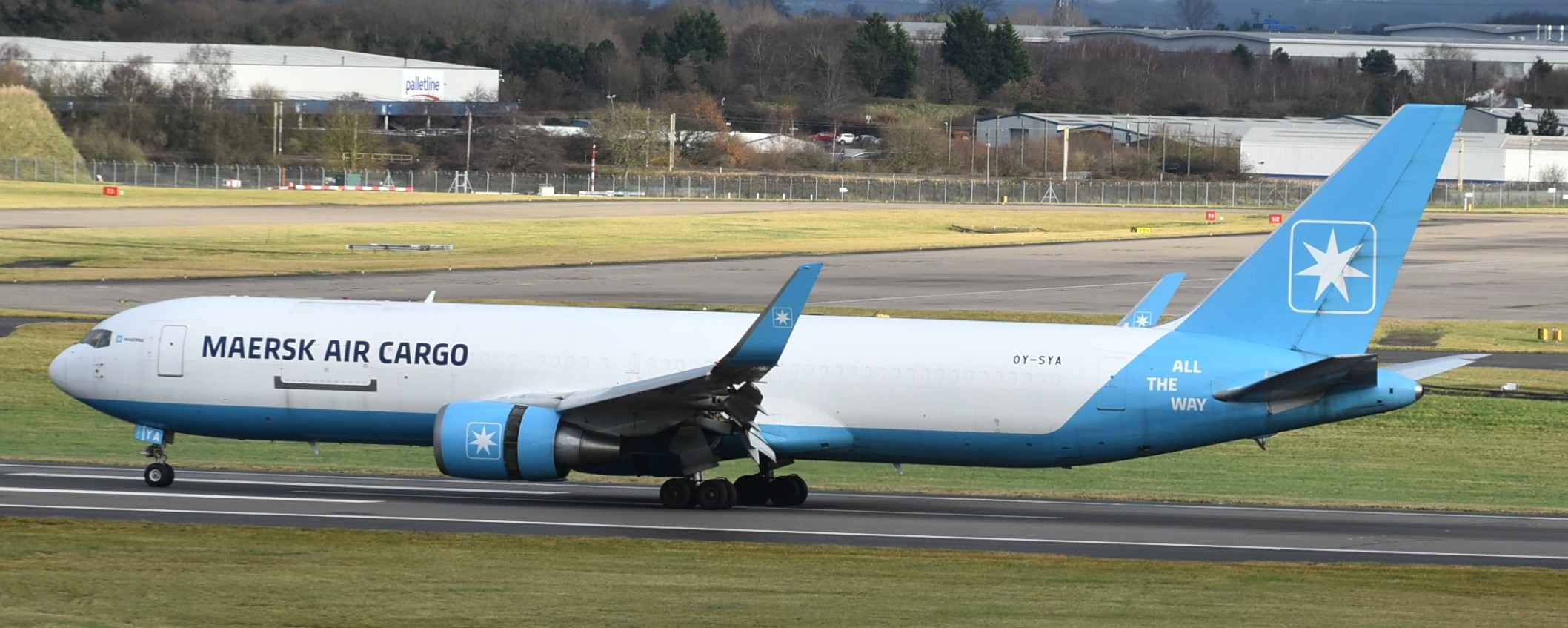
- 767-300ER(BDSF)
IATA	ICAO	Call sign
DJ	SRR	WHITESTAR
- Founded: 1 September 1987; 39 years ago
- Hubs: Billund; Cologne/Bonn; East Midlands
- Fleet size: 16
- Parent company: Maersk
- Headquarters: Dragør, Denmark
- Key people: Lars Jordahn (CEO)
- Website: maersk.com

Maersk Air Cargo, formerly named Star Air and a subsidiary of Maersk Air airline, is a Danish cargo airline and part of Danish business conglomerate Maersk Group. It is headquartered in København, Denmark. It operates a fleet of 22 Boeing 767 and Boeing 777F cargo aircraft. Several of these are flown on contract to United Parcel Service (UPS) and are based at Cologne Bonn Airport, Germany & East Midlands Airport, UK.

The airline was established in 1987 through the purchase of Alkair's Fokker 27 operations by Maersk Group. Originally Star Air had three Fokker F27 Friendships, which were later increased to four. These were used for both passenger and cargo operations. One was involved in a fatal accident in 1988. In 1993 the air carrier secured a last-minute deal with UPS, allowing it to start operations out of Cologne/Bonn airport with Boeing 727s. In that same year Star Air became a subsidiary of now defunct Maersk Air airline. The Fokkers were retired in 1996, after which time the airline had exclusively flown for UPS. More updated and reliable Boeing 757s were introduced in 2001 while, in the years 2005–2006, the airline replaced its entire fleet, introducing the current 767s. Meanwhile, Maersk Air airline was sold to Sterling Airlines but Star Air ownership was kept by the Maersk Group. In 2013, the airline had a revenue of DKK 813 million and a net profit of DKK 69 million. It employed 119 pilots, 41 mechanics and 36 administrative staff.

== History ==
=== Early years ===
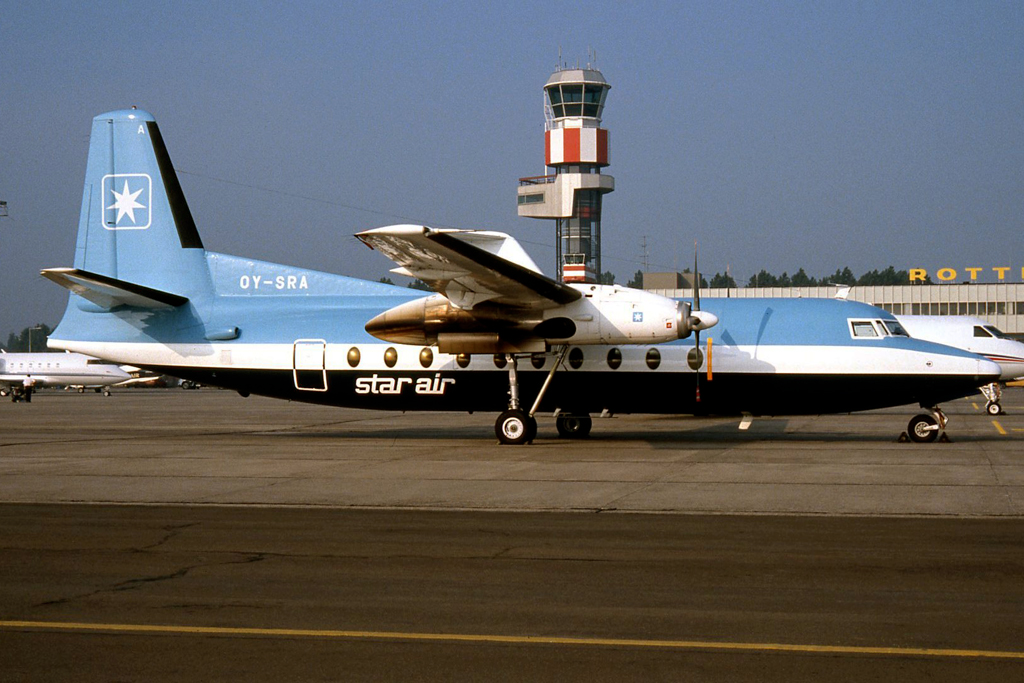
One of the first Fokker F27 Friendships

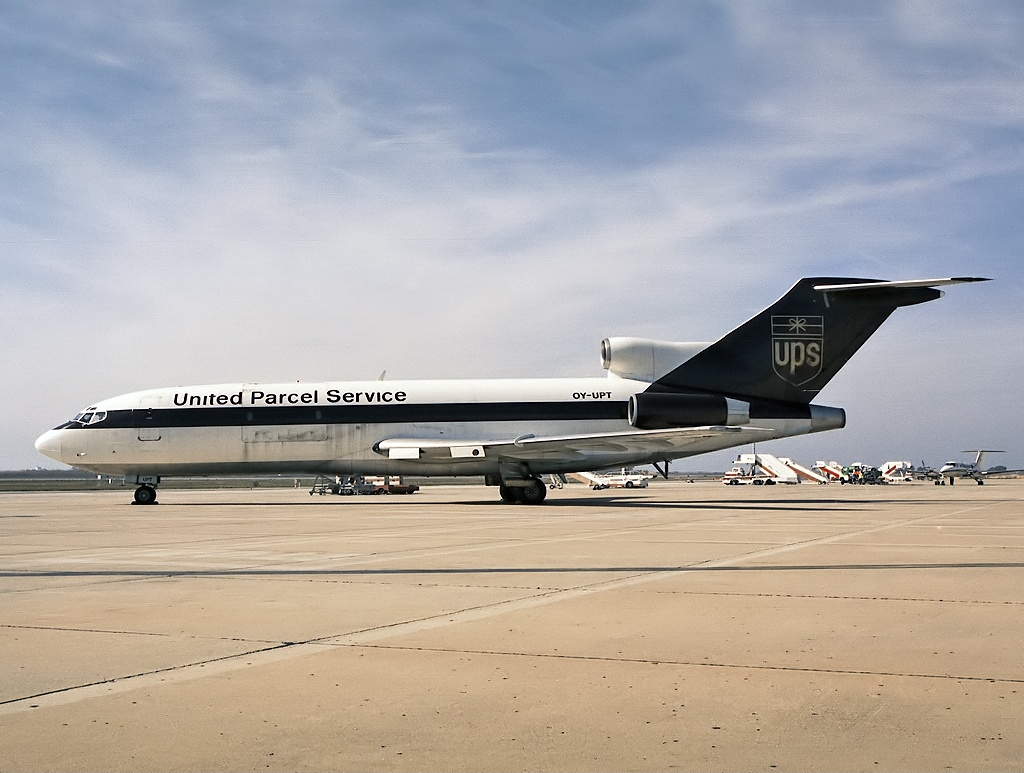
A Boeing 727-100 operated for UPS in 2001

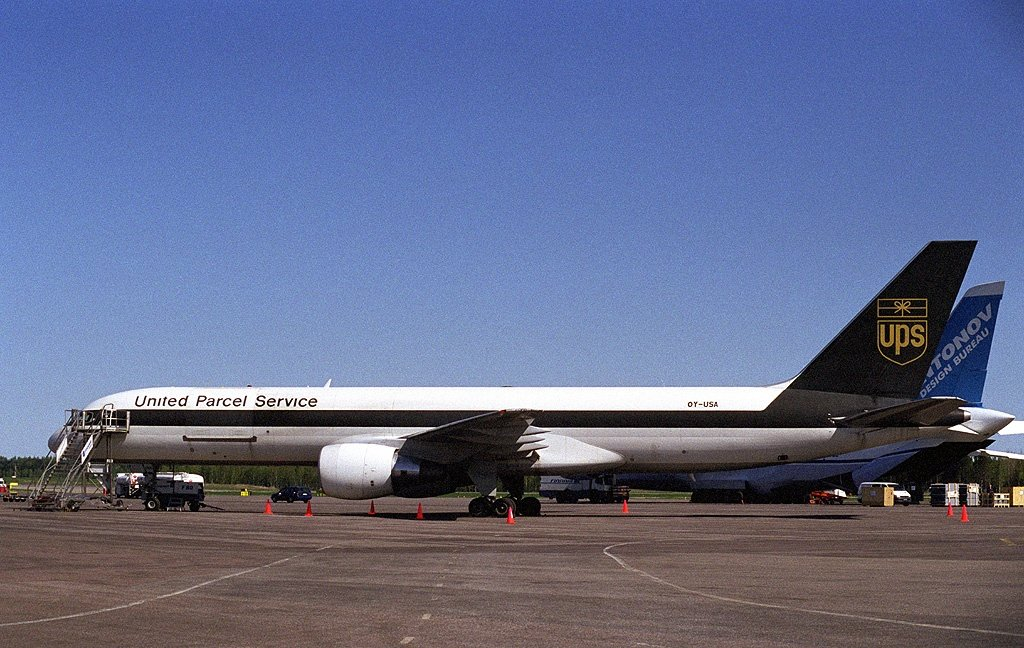
A Boeing 757-200F operated for UPS in 2004

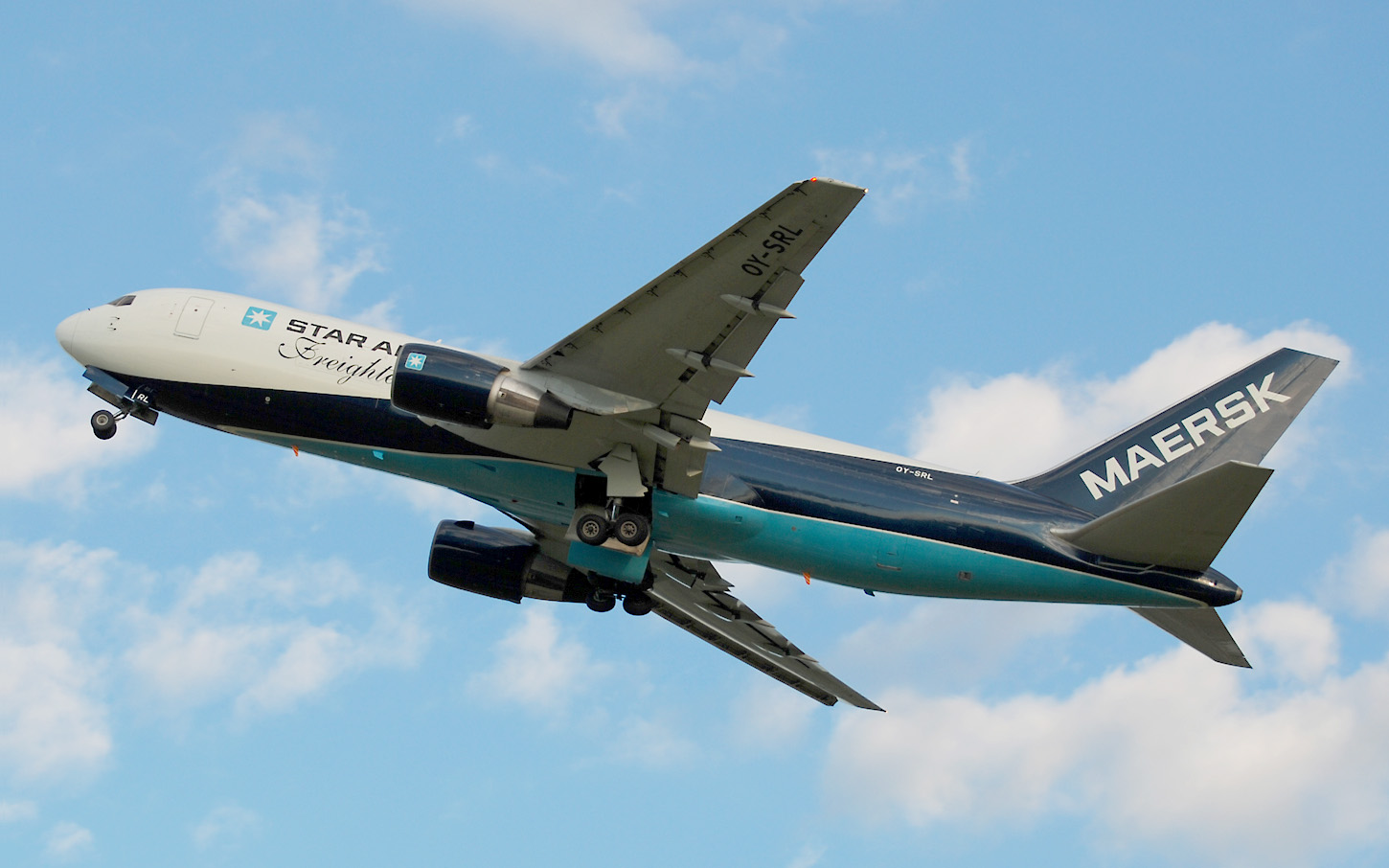
MA Boeing 767-200SF in mixed Star Air/Maersk Air livery

Maersk Group entered the airline industry when it established Maersk Air A/S in February 1979 and activated it in the month of November of that same year. The airline was officially incorporated on 1 January 1970. Given the business of the parent company, Maersk Air management immediately looked at the possibilities to operate freight transport. The airline started operations with three F27s, fitted with large side doors for easy conversion passenger-to-cargo interior. Oriental Air Transport Services, a cargo handling company based at Kastrup, was bought in 1971. The airline aimed at buying a Boeing 747, but restrictions on freight transport caused these plans to be abandoned. Until 1987, the rules in Denmark only permitted SAS to operate freight charters. The only exception was if the entire shipment had a single sender and recipient. This made filling an entire cargo plane uneconomical and resulted in Maersk abandoning its cargo plans. Maersk Air Cargo was set up in 1982 as a cargo division. Due to the regulations in force, it only acted as a ground handling agent for overseas airlines, the largest being Cathay Pacific.

=== New name same business ===
When the deregulation took effect in 1987, the Maersk Group immediately established Star Air A/S as a wholly-owned subsidiary and incorporated it on 1 September 1987. After that it bought an existing hangar on the south sector of Copenhagen Airport. The ground facilities, an organization and an air operator's certificate (AOC) was taken over through the purchase of Alkair Fokker 27 operations. For this reason three Fokker F27-600s were leased and converted to combi-freighters: they could be converted from freighter to passenger configuration in half an hour. At the beginning Star Air performed a mixture of activities: corporate charters, wet lease to other airlines, charter and domestic operations on Maersk Air behalf, and European hauls for freight companies, including FedEx, TNT and UPS.

By 1990, the airline was operating four F-27s and had a revenue of DKK 66 million. But with increased competition, the airline made a loss of DKK 10 million in 1991. To cut costs the operations were transferred to a new legal entity, Star Air I/S, which was a Maersk Air subsidiary. Lack of sufficient cargo volumes resulted in Star Air carrying out passenger flights as well, on wet lease basis.

In 1991 UPS announced a tender to find a European partner. The U.S. group did not have the rights to fly intra-European flights and needed a European airline to fly services out of their hub at Cologne-Bonn airport. The two main contenders were Star Air and Sterling Airways, another Danish airline. Sterling had two main advantages: they already operated the Boeing 727 and they were approved by the Federal Aviation Administration. The latter would allow them to fly aircraft which were owned by UPS and registered in the United States.

Sterling fell into financial distress in 1993 and months before the contract was to take effect its credits were cut off. UPS backed out of the expected deal and approached Star Air instead. An agreement was signed on 22 October 1993, with services commencing ten days later. This could be done because Star Air turned to Sterling employees who had already been working for the contract with UPS. People who had been employed by Sterling were quickly hired by Star Air, including pilots, engineers and office staff. The initial UPS contract consisted of flights to Milan, Rome, Zaragoza and Porto, but the operations were gradually expanded and soon Star Air was operating four Boeing 727s.

Also in 1993, the air carrier started to retire the Fokkers: falling prices for smaller cargo aircraft had made this operation unprofitable. At the same time a closer integration with Maersk Air was carried out, in which the two companies received a common administration, operations center and navigational division. The Fokker F27s were retired in 1996 and since then Star Air solely flew for UPS. Revenues of DKK 82 million in 1997, rose to DKK 159 million in 2002. Profits in this period varied between DKK 12 and 20 million.

A total of eight 727s entered service, all being the 100 series with Rolls-Royce RB.183 Tay engines. Two aircraft were taken into service in 1993, one more in 1994, two more in 1996, one more in 1997 and the last in 2001.

=== Development in the 2000s ===
Four Boeing 757-200s were introduced in 2001 and 2002, and the number of 727s cut to four. After signing a new contract with validity until 2015, Star Air carried out a full fleet replacement in 2005 and 2006. All the 727s and 757s were returned and instead eleven Boeing 767-200s were leased. This gave a major hike in revenue, increasing from DKK 106 million in 2004 to DKK 653 million in 2007. Profits increased from DKK 7 to 58 million. Some new events were in sight: Maersk Air was sold to Sterling Airlines in 2005. Star Air was not included in the deal and instead became a subsidiary of Maersk Group. It was also given the responsibility for operating the Maersk Group's corporate jet, a Canadair Challenger 600. Star Air took delivery of its first Boeing 767-300 in 2014. Operations continued without any particular changes in the following years and in the spring of 2022 the airline changed its name to Maersk Air Cargo.

In 2024, Maersk took delivery of two new Boeing 777Fs and started long-haul service between China and Europe. In early 2026, Maersk disposed of three 767 freighters which were operated in the US by Amerijet, with the Amerijet contract terminated early.

== Operations ==
Maersk Air Cargo operates scheduled cargo flights on behalf of UPS Airlines out of its base at Cologne Bonn Airport as well as further freight operations out of its base at Billund Airport to China on behalf of its parent Maersk and other customers on a charter basis.

Maersk Air Cargo also operates scheduled cargo flights on behalf of Royal Mail & UPS from East Midlands Airport to destinations across the United Kingdom & Europe such as Belfast–International, Birmingham & Edinburgh.

== Fleet ==
=== Current fleet ===
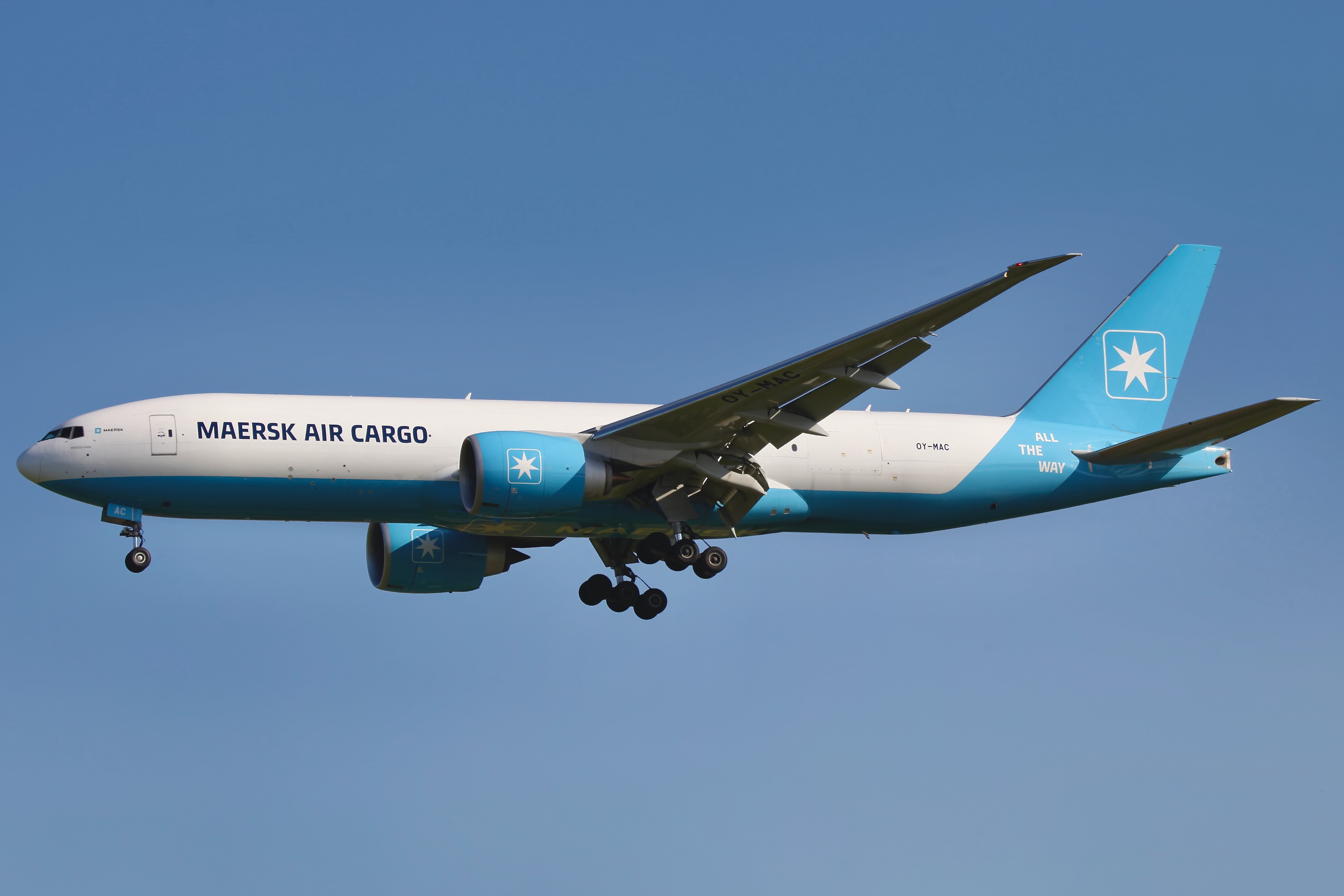
Boeing 777F

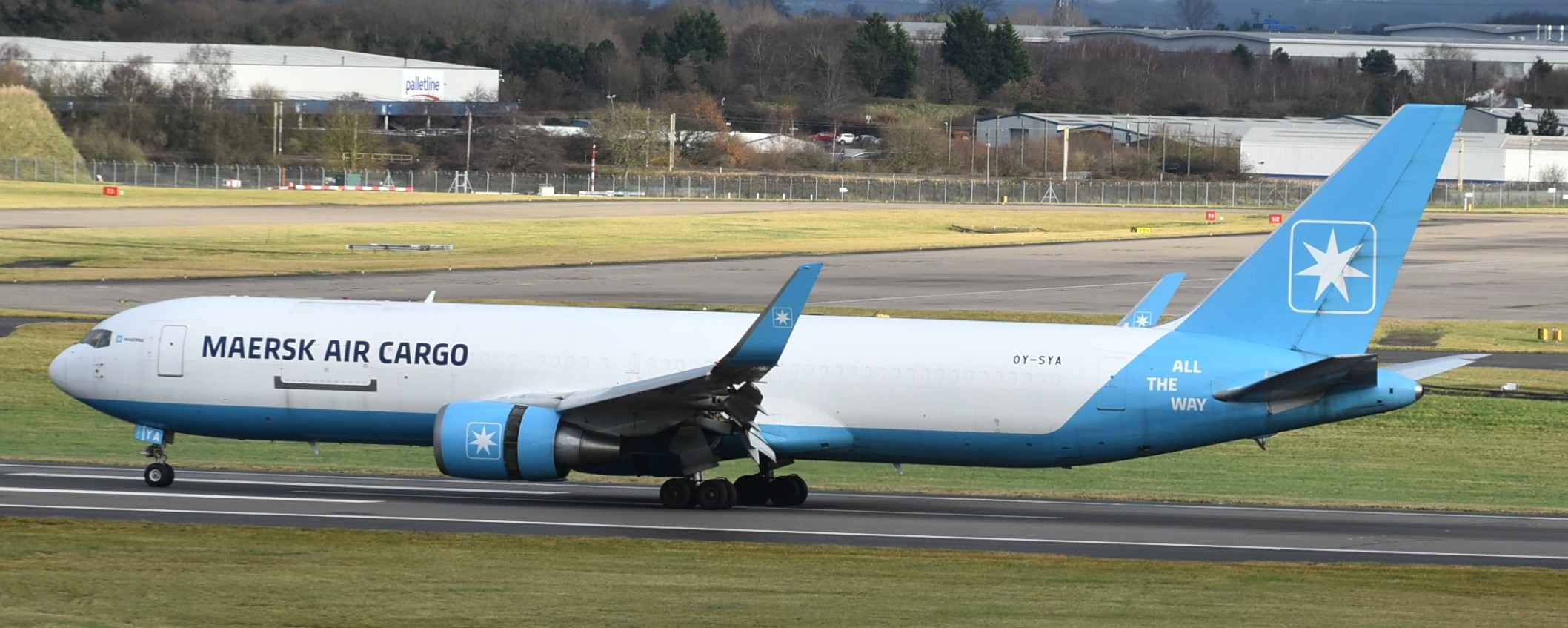
767-300ER(BDSF)

As of July 2026, the Maersk Air Cargo fleet consists of the following aircraft:

Aircraft	In service	Orders	Notes
Boeing 767-200BDSF	7	—	
Boeing 767-300F	2	—	Three sold in early 2026
Boeing 767-300ER(BDSF)	5	—	Three sold in early 2026
Boeing 777F	2	—	
Total	16	—	

=== Former fleet ===
Aircraft	Retired	Introduced	Retired	Refs
Boeing 727-100	8	1993	2004	
Boeing 757-200PF	4	2001	2005	
Bombardier Challenger 604	1	2005	2015	
Fokker F27-100 Friendship	5	1987	1996	

== Accidents and incidents ==
Star Air's only hull-loss accident took place on 26 May 1988. The Fokker F-27 OY-APE flew from Copenhagen to Billund, where it loaded cargo and continued onwards to Hannover Airport and Nuremberg Airport. The cargo was improperly distributed so that the aircraft became aft-heavy. Although the captain was aware of this situation, he did not relay the information to the first officer, who was the pilot flying. He therefore failed to correlate for this during the landing at Hannover, having the flaps set incorrectly. When the first officer increased power for a go-around, the load shifted, the aircraft pitched up and subsequently crashed. Both pilots were killed.

== Bibliography ==
- Ellemose, Søren (2009). Luftens helte (in Danish). Aarhus: Jyllands-Posten Forlag. ISBN 978-87-7692-197-2.
