= Danair =

Danish airline

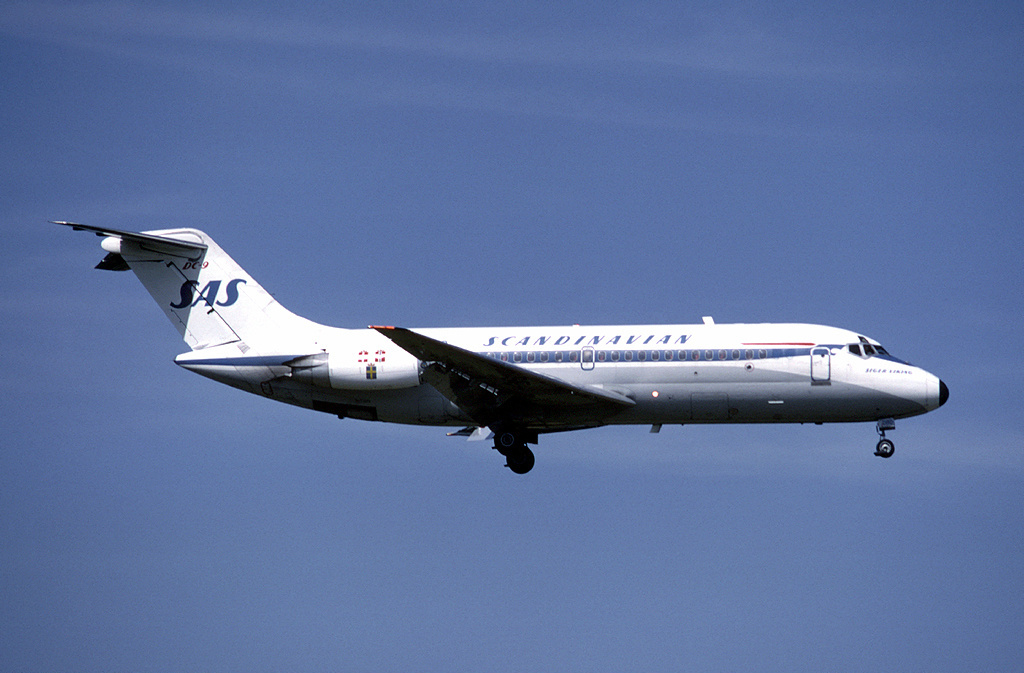
IATA	ICAO	Call sign
DX	DEN	DANISH
- Founded: 1971
- Ceased operations: 1995
- Hubs: Copenhagen Airport

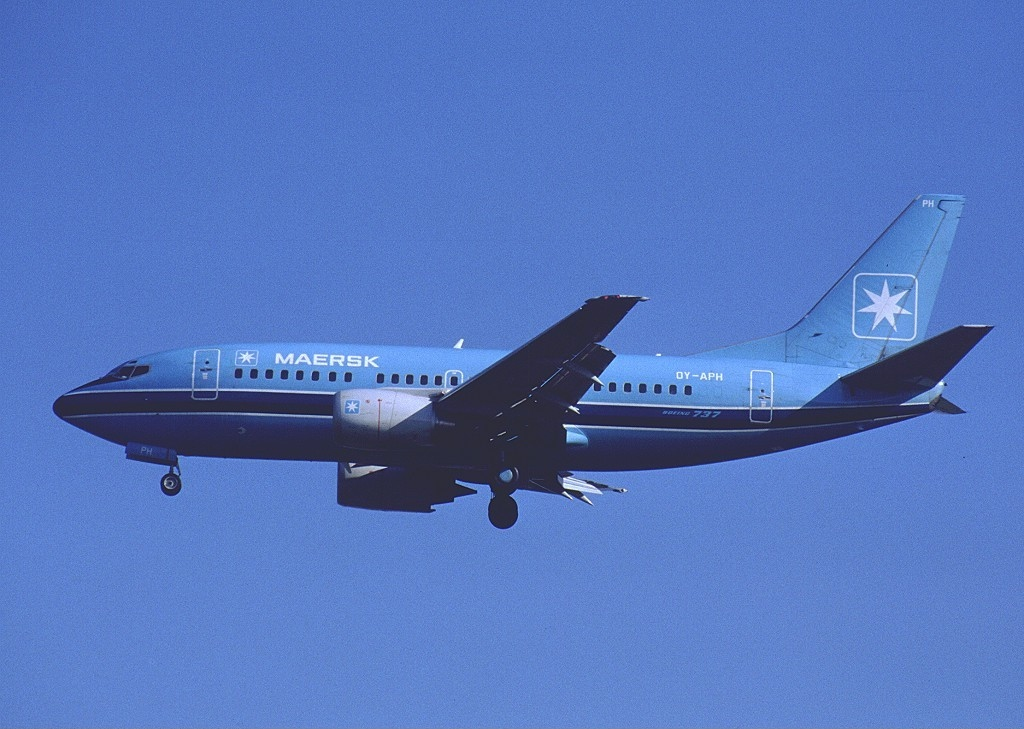

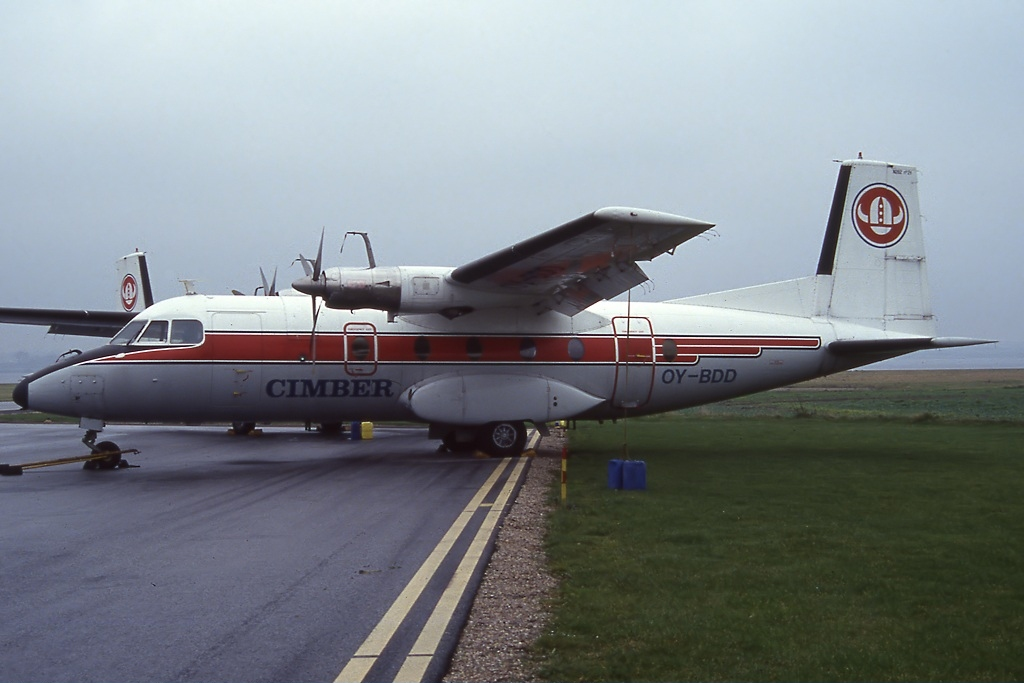

Danair A/S was a consortium airline in Denmark, established in April 1971 and headquartered in Kastrup, Tårnby Municipality.

== History ==
It was a joint venture between Scandinavian Airlines System (57% ownership), Maersk Air (38%) and Cimber Air (5%). The three airlines marketed all domestic flights with this name from November 1, 1971, until the liberalization of the airline market in the European Union in 1995.

SAS flew the routes from Copenhagen Airport to Aalborg, Aarhus and Karup, as well as to the Greenland airports of Kangerlussuaq and Narsarsuaq. Maersk Air flew the routes to Billund, Rønne, Esbjerg, Vojens and Odense. Cimber Air flew the routes to Sønderborg.
