= Thisted Airport =

Thisted Airport Thisted Lufthavn
- IATA: TED; ICAO: EKTS

Summary
- Airport type: Public
- Operator: No operator since Feb 2007
- Location: Thisted
- Elevation AMSL: 23 ft (7.0 m)
- Coordinates: 57°04′07.68″N 008°42′18.81″E
- Interactive map of Thisted Airport

Runways
Direction	Length		Surface
Direction	ft	m	Surface
10/28	5,249	1,600	Asphalt

Statistics (2006)
- Passengers: 9837
- Aircraft movements: 3334

Thisted Airport (Danish: Thisted Lufthavn) (IATA: TED, ICAO: EKTS) is a small airport servicing the Danish town of Thisted. It is owned by Thisted municipality. It is located on Danish national road 26, 8 kilometers from Hanstholm and 15 kilometers from Thisted. The airport opened in 1970.

== Overview ==
Thisted Airport previously serviced two daily flights between Thisted and the Danish capital, Copenhagen, a service operated by flying.dk which also served as operator of the airport. Flying.dk suspended all flights from the airport effective 1 February 2007. Thisted municipality has supported operations of the airport with an annual 2.5 million DKK. No new operator has been found, and public funding would be needed to operate flights. The nearest airport from Thisted is Aalborg Airport, 86 kilometres (53 mi) road distance.

== See also ==
- List of the largest airports in the Nordic countries
