= Esbjerg Airport =

Esbjerg Airport Esbjerg Lufthavn
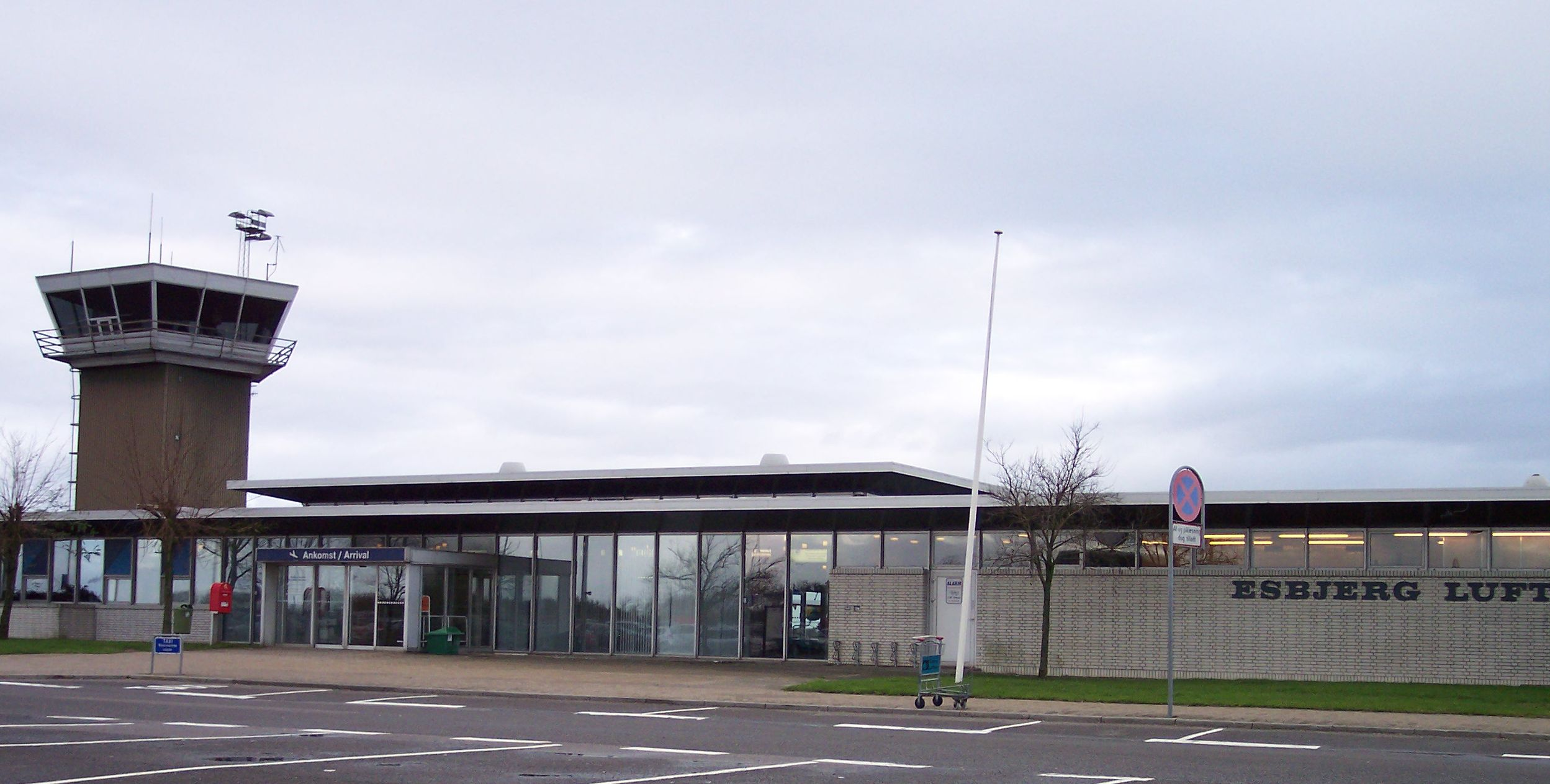
- IATA: EBJ; ICAO: EKEB

Summary
- Airport type: Public
- Serves: Esbjerg, Denmark
- Elevation AMSL: 97 ft (30 m)
- Coordinates: 55°31′33″N 08°33′12″E
- Website: esbjergairport.dk

Map
- Location in Denmark

Runways
Direction	Length		Surface
Direction	ft	m	Surface
08/26	8,527	2,599	Asphalt

Statistics (2018)
- Passengers: 76,214
- Cargo (tonnes): 0

Esbjerg Airport (Danish: Esbjerg Lufthavn) (IATA: EBJ, ICAO: EKEB) is a small airport located 5 nautical miles (9.2 km) northeast of Esbjerg, Denmark. The airport was opened on 4 April 1971.

== Airlines and destinations ==
The following airlines operate regular scheduled and charter flights at the airport:

Airlines	Destinations
Loganair	Aberdeen
LYGG	Den Helder, Emden, Groningen, Stavanger

The primary use of Esbjerg Airport is as a heliport for flying offshore out to the North Sea oil and gas platforms.

== See also ==
- List of the largest airports in the Nordic countries
