= List of aircraft operated by Maersk Air =

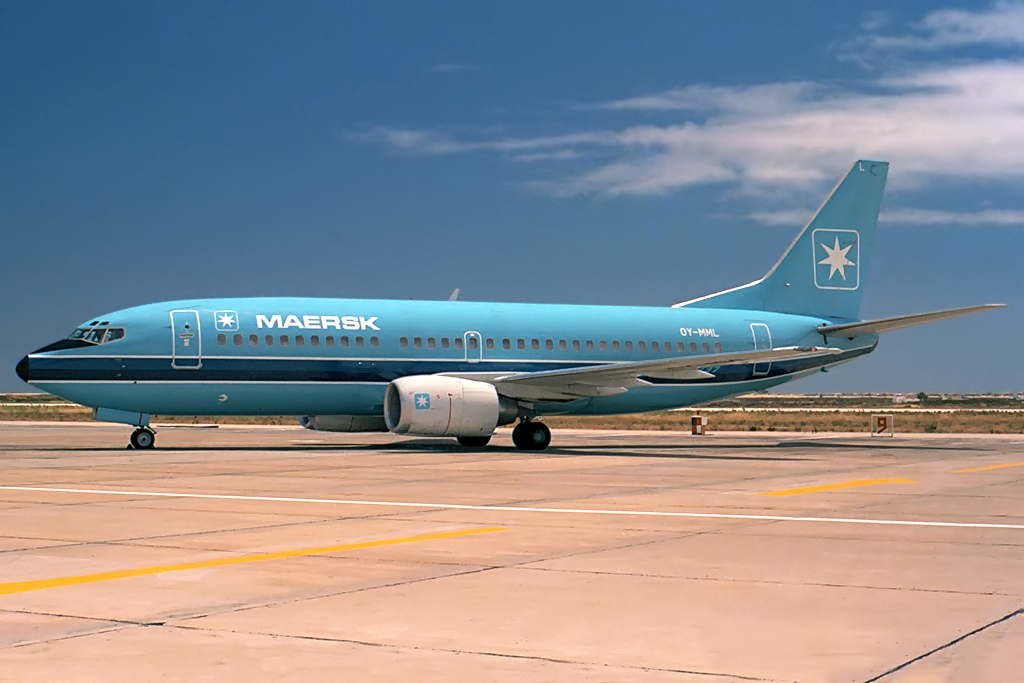
Boeing 737-300 at Faro Airport in 1986

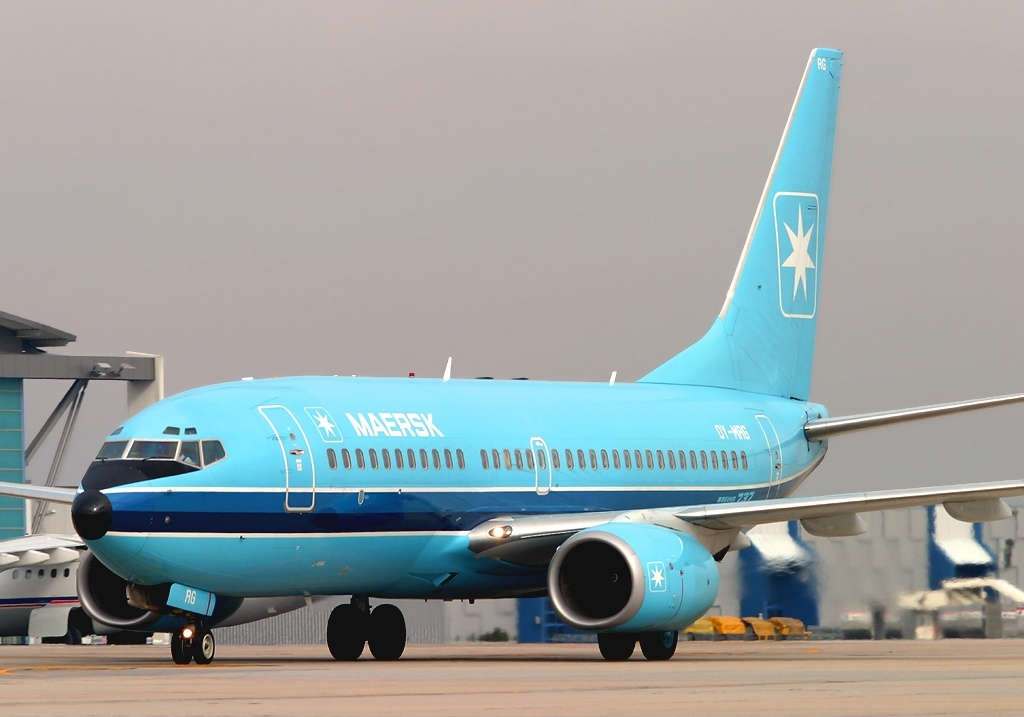

Maersk Air was a Danish airline which operated between 1970 and 2005. Owned by the eponymous A. P. Møller–Mærsk Group, it operated a combination of domestic and international scheduled flights, and charter flights. It included a helicopter and corporate jet division and had three wholly owned subsidiaries: Maersk Commuter, Maersk Air UK and Star Air. Combined, they operated 193 aircraft of 26 models. This included eleven models from Boeing, four models from Bombardier, two each from Hawker Siddeley, Fokker and Eurocopter. The most popular aircraft was the Boeing 737, of which the airline operated 78 airframes of five variants. Four aircraft have been involved in hull-lost accidents.

Maersk Air was established upon the take-over of Falck Air. It commenced operations using de Havilland Heron, Hawker Siddeley HS 748 and Fokker F27 Friendship regional airliners. After entering the inclusive tours market, five Boeing 720s became the airline's first jetliners. The 737-200 was introduced in 1976, but proved too small for many domestic routes. This caused Maersk to introduce the de Havilland Canada Dash 7 in 1981, replaced by the Fokker 50 from 1988. The fleet of 737 Classics was introduced from 1985 and from 1998 the 737 Next Generation. The Fokkers were replaced by Bombardier CRJ200s from 1998. Maersk Air was sold to Sterling Airlines in 2005 and ceased operations.

Throughout its history it also operated a corporate jet for the Maersk Group, which have successively consisted of three Hawker Siddeley HS 125 and two Bombardier Challenger 600. The Helicopter division was based at Esbjerg Airport and flew offshore transport for Maersk Oil to oil platforms. It various operated Bell 212, Eurocopter AS332 Super Pumas and Eurocopter AS365 Dauphin 2. Maersk Commuter operated an Embraer EMB 110 Bandeirante and two Short 360. Star Air operated an all-cargo fleet variously consisting of the F27, Boeing 727, 757 and finally the 767. The UK division operated the BAC One-Eleven, the 737-500 and later the CRJ.

The airline was an active investor in aircraft, and a significant portion of the fleet was at any time dry-leased to other operators. Maersk commonly bought new models, achieving good prices and retained them often for only five years before selling them again. Half of Maersk Air's accumulative profits came from the sale of used aircraft. Inspired by the importance of critical timing in the purchase and sale of ships, Maersk Air made several advantageous deals, including the sale of 737-200s for a higher price than they had paid for them.

== Livery ==
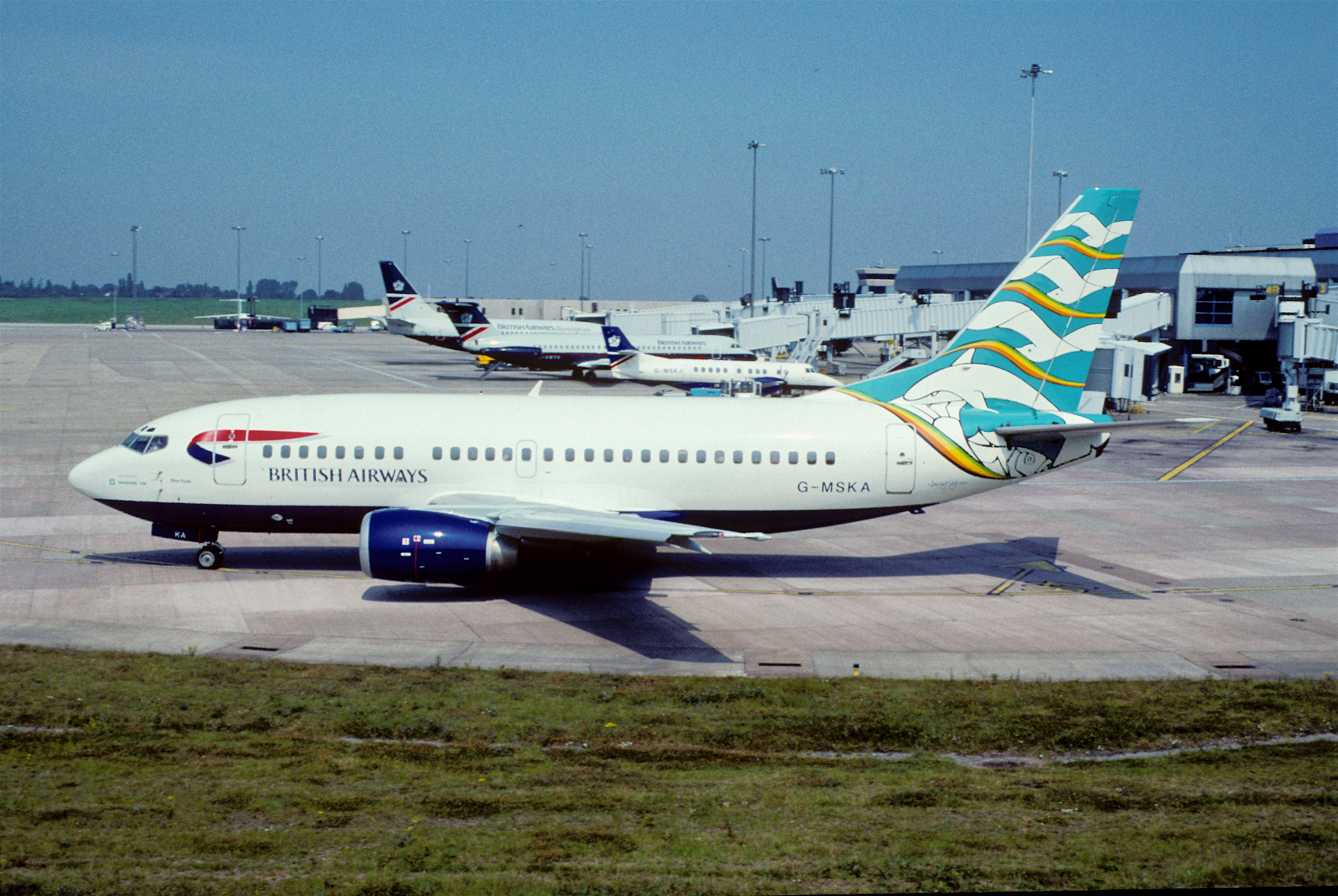
A Boeing 737-500 of Maersk Air UK in a British Airways ethnic livery

From the onset Maersk Air use the Maersk Group's visual profile. This consisted of the fuselage covered in a sky blue paint scheme, with a dark blue cheatline down the side. The airline used the group's logo, consisting of a white heptagram star on sky blue background. The star appeared on the front sides of the fuselage and on the vertical stabilizer.

Due to the franchise agreement with British Airways, Maersk Air UK applied the British corporation's livery to its UK fleet. This originally consisted of the "Landor" scheme and later the ethnic liveries. Similarly, due to its aircraft solely being employed by United Parcel Service, Star Air had its 727s and 757s painted in UPS Airlines' livery. As the original batch of aircraft came from UPS, this had the added advantage of the aircraft not having to be repainted.

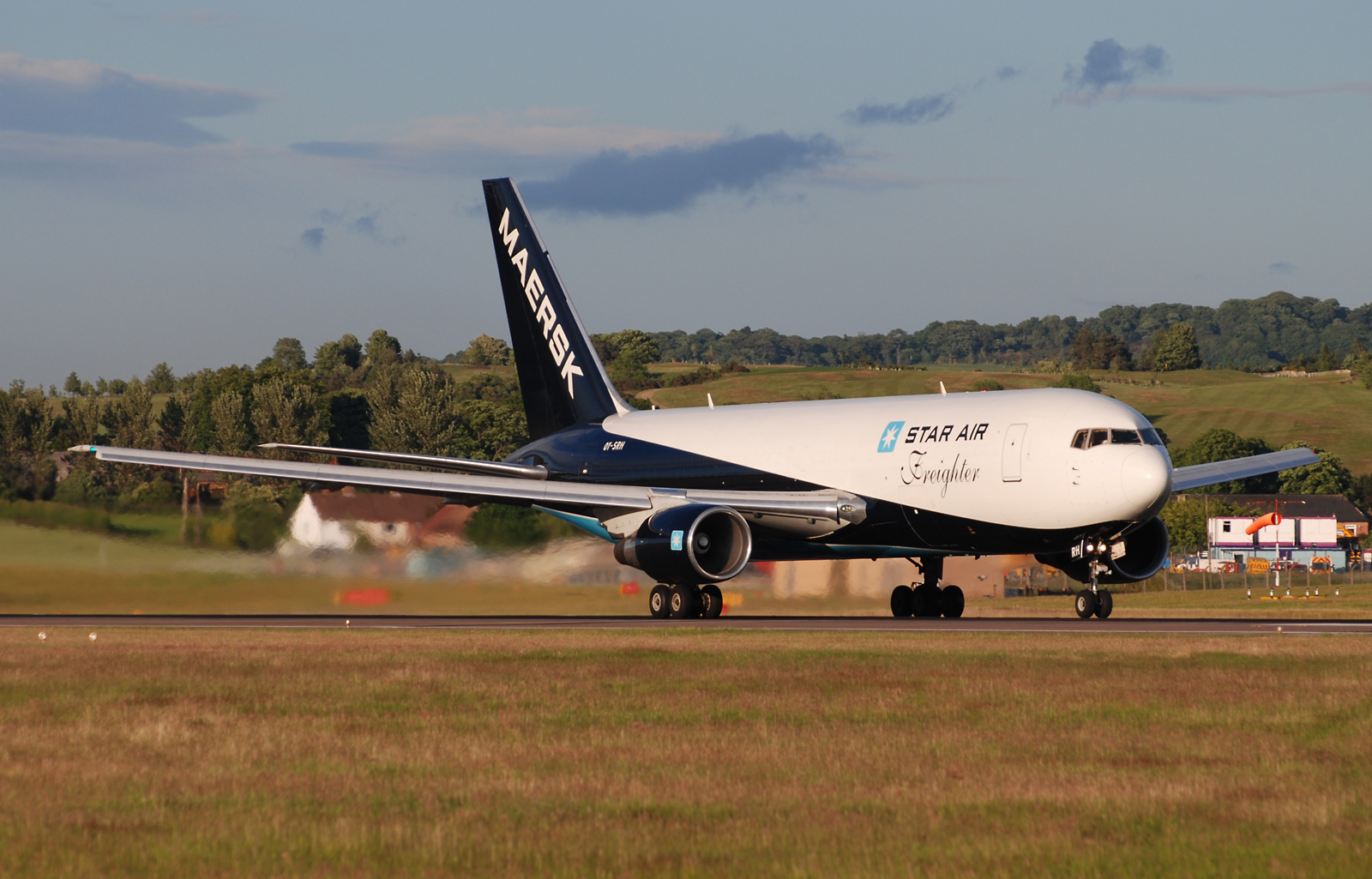
Boeing 767-200 of Star Air in the post-2004 livery adopted by both Star Air and Maersk Air

Maersk Air's theme was changed in 2004, when the "fly as you like" program was introduced. The bodies were instead painted in sections of three colors, white, dark blue and light blue, respectively. The Maersk star was removed from the tail and replaced with a wordmark. A similar scheme was adopted by Star Air with the delivery of their 767s. These also carry the "Maersk" wordmark on the vertical stabilizer.

== Aircraft ==
The following is a list of aircraft operated by Maersk Air and its subsidiaries. This includes aircraft operated by Maersk Commuter, Maersk Air UK, Star Air and Maersk Air's helicopter division and corporate jets. It excludes aircraft operated by partially owned subsidiaries, including Birmingham European Airways, Brymon Airways, Brymon European Airways and Estonian Air.

The list consists of the total number of aircraft operated by the airline (although the peak number operated may be lower), the year the type was first introduced, the year the last aircraft was taken out of service, and a description of the aircraft's use.

Maersk Air aircraft
Aircraft	Image	Quantity	Introduced	Retired	Notes
Hawker Siddeley HS 125	Twin-engine rear-mounted jetliner with turbojets	3	1967	1993	Maersk operated a corporate jet, all name Jætte Mærsk. In addition to executive trips, it flew mechanics and spare parts to ships which had been stranded due to mechanical failure. This proved to be a profitable investment. The first aircraft, a model -3B, flew until 1972, when it was replaced by a -400B series. It was used until 1985, when it was replaced with a -700B series, which was retired in 1993.
de Havilland Heron	—	2	1969	1970	The Herons were inherited from Falck Air when that was bought in 1969. They were retired the following year with the delivery of the F-27s. The Herons were predominantly used on the route from Copenhagen to Stauning Airport.
Hawker Siddeley HS 748	—	5	1970	1981	Two of the aircraft were taken over in the purchase of Falck Air. They were retired within a year and replaced by the F27s. Three aircraft were bought in 1980 and stayed with the airline for a year while the airline was waiting for the Dash 7s to be delivered. They were used on domestic hauls.
Fokker F27-100 Friendship	Propliner with high wings and wing-mounted twin engines	10	1969	1996	The first five aircraft were delivered ahead of Maersk Air commencing operations. They were the main workhorse for the first year, operating a combination of domestic scheduled and charter flights. These were retired between 1976 and 1978. Star Air took delivery of three combi-variants in 1987 and flew them in a combination of freight and passenger charter. All of Maersk's three fixed-wing write-off accidents have occurred with F-27s.
Boeing 720B	Quad-engine wing-mounted jetliner with turbojets	5	1973	1981	The aircraft were bought after Maersk had bought travel agencies and was entering the inclusive tours market through Unisol. The 720s thad seats for 170 passengers and also had range, allowing a wide array of Mediterranean destinations. They were sold after Maersk left the inclusive tours business.
Bell 212	—	5	1975	1993	From 1981 one was station on the Faroe Islands under contract with the Cabinet of the Faroe Islands. One aircraft was written off in a fatal accident in the North Sea on 2 January 1984.
Boeing 737-200 Advanced	Twin-engine wing-mounted jetliner with turbojets	14	1976	1990	The aircraft were initially bought to be used on domestic flights, replacing the much smaller F-27s. They soon proved to be too large for most flights, with the notable exception of to the Faroe Islands, for which they needed short-run configuration. The -200s were gradually shifted to inclusive tour charter, wet lease operations and dry lease.
Embraer EMB 110 Bandeirante	Propliner with low wings and wing-mounted twin engines	1	1980	1984	The aircraft was the first operated by Air Business and was mostly used for ad hoc charter. From 1983 to 1984 it served on the international service from Jutland to Stavanger.
de Havilland Canada Dash 7-102	Propliner with high wings and wing-mounted quad engines	5	1981	1989	The Boeing 737s proved to be too large for most domestic services, so Maersk procured the Dash 7s to use it on the least-trafficked domestic routes. They were mostly used on services from Copenhagen to Jutland and Odense. From 1984 they also saw a limited use on early international flights out of Billund.
Eurocopter AS332 Super Puma	Medium-weight twin-engine helicopter	5	1983	1999	With increased offshore petroleum activity, Maersk Oil was in need of additional transport capacity. Two helicopters were delivered in 1983 and one in 1991. The oldest two were replaced with new models in 1996. Three passed on to British International Helicopters.
Short 360-100	Propliner with high wings and wing-mounted twin engines	2	1984	1990	The aircraft were operated by Air Business and then Maersk Commuter on the group's first international scheduled service, connecting Esbjerg and Thisted, later Aalborg, to Stavanger.
Boeing 737-300	Medium-sized twin-engined jetliner with turbofans	22	1985	1998	The larger -300 series replaced the -200 series on domestic scheduled and charter services. Later it was the foundation for higher-pax routes out of Billund and Copenhagen.
Eurocopter AS365 Dauphin	—	2	1993	1999	The Dauphins were bought to replace the Bells on offshore helicopter services. They were passed on to British International Helicopters.
Boeing 727-200 Advanced	Triple-engine tail-mounted jetliner with turbojets	7	1993	2004	The 727s were introduced after Star Air won a contract to be United Parcel Service's European airline partner. The aircraft were painted in the UPS livery and were operated out of their hub at Cologne Bonn Airport.
Boeing 727-100	—	1	1996	2004	Star Air operated one smaller -100-series of the 727. Like the larger variants it was used to haul for United Parcel Service. The aircraft carried a UPS livery.
Fokker 50	Propliner with high wings and wing-mounted twin engines	9	1988	2000	The Fokker 50s were ordered both to replace the Dash 7s and to allow the airline to operate additional scheduled services out of Billund Airport. They were sold and leased back in 1996. A sharp decrease in domestic traffic from 1998 resulted in them being moved to the larger domestic routes, with the smaller services being terminated. Meanwhile, they were cut from international routes at ridership increased.
Boeing 737-500	Medium-sized twin-engined jetliner with turbofans	24	1990	2005	The -300s provide too large for some routes and Maersk, along with other airlines, requested that Boeing develop a shorter version of the aircraft. There smaller size allowed the last -200s to be retired. The aircraft were used on a mix of scheduled and charter services. Six aircraft flew for Maersk Air UK with British Airways livery. Six were passed on to Sterling Airlines.
British Aircraft Corporation 1-11-400	Twin-engine rear-mounted jetliner with turbojets	4	1993	1998	The aircraft were taken over from Brymon European Airways for the creation of Maersk Air UK. They were operated in a mix of international and domestic scheduled services out of Birmingham Airport and remained in British Airways livery.
British Aircraft Corporation 1-11-500	Twin-engine rear-mounted jetliner with turbojets	2	1993	1998	The slightly larger One-Elevens were taken over from British Airways in 1994 and remained in use by Maersk Air UK for domestic and international services.
British Aerospace Jetstream 31	Twin-engine wing-mounted turboprop small regional airliner	3	1993	1996	The aircraft were taken over from Brymon European Airways for the creation of Maersk Air UK. Operated out of Birmingham, they were used on the least-patronized international services.
Boeing 737-400	Medium-sized twin-engined jetliner with turbofans	3	1993	1996	Two were acquired in 1993 and operated until 1994, while one was used during parts of 1996.
British Aerospace Jetstream 41		1	1996	1999	The aircraft was taken over from British Airways, allowing Maersk Air UK to retire its last Jetstream 31. The turboprop was used on the least popular international routes out of Birmingham.
Bombardier Challenger 604	Small jetliner with aft-mounted twin engines	2	1997	present	The first Challenger was delivered in 1997, and replaced by a second in 2000. Since 2005 the corporate jets have been operated by Star Air.
Boeing 737-700	Medium-sized twin-engined jetliner with turbofans	15	1998	2005	The aircraft were ordered to take advantage of their lower operating costs and replaced the 737-300 on the heaviest routes and charter services. Twelve were passed on to Sterling Airlines.
Bombardier CRJ-200	Small jetliner with aft-mounted twin engines	11	1998	2004	The regional jetliners were ordered to allow Maersk Air's One-Elevens and the Jetstreams to be retired. They later also replaced some of the 737s. Later they were also taken into use in Denmark. Two aircraft were passed on to Duo Airways.
Boeing 757-200	Medium-sized twin-engined jetliner with turbofans	4	2001	2005	Star Air took delivery of these four aircraft between 2001 and 2003 to allow for larger cargo aircraft. They aircraft were flown for and were painted in the livery of United Parcel Service.
Bombardier CRJ-700	Small jetliner with aft-mounted twin engines	5	2001	2003	The larger variant of the CRJs became the workhorse of the British operations, serving international destinations out of Birmingham. The aircraft were passed on to Duo Airways.
Boeing 767-200	Medium-sized twin-engined jetliner with turbofans	11	2004	present	Following the signing of a decade-long contract with United Parcel Service, Star Air took delivery of the aircraft between 2004 and 2006. They fly European freight services out of Cologne Bonn Airport.
Boeing 767-300	—	1	2014	present	Star Air leases the larger -300 to supplement its fleet of cargo haulers.
