= Maersk Air UK =

British Airline

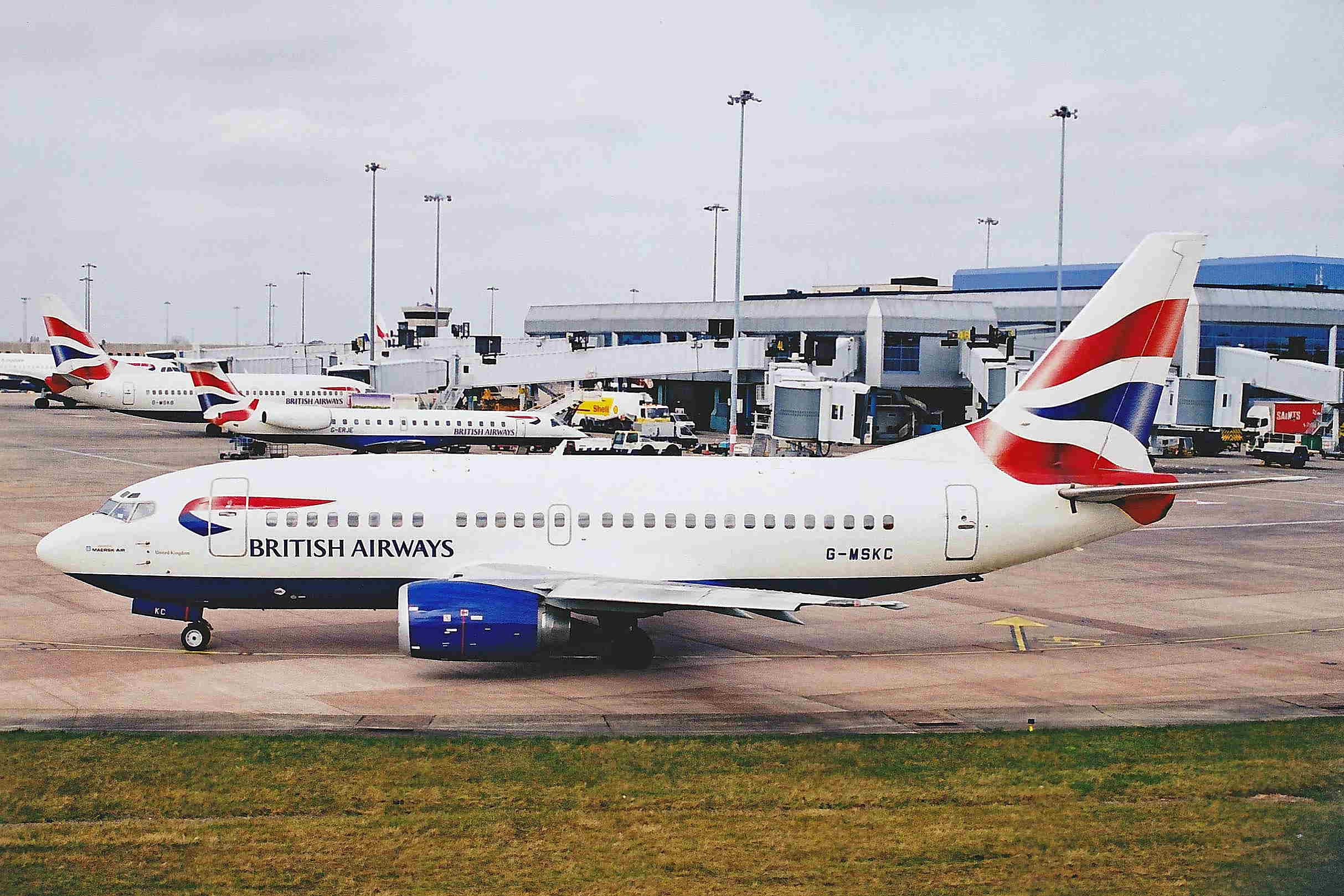
- Boeing 737-500 at Birmingham Airport
IATA	ICAO	Call sign
VB	MSK	Bluestar
- Founded: July 1993 (out of Brymon European Airways assets)
- Commenced operations: August 1993
- Ceased operations: 2003 (changed name to Duo Airways)
- Operating bases: Birmingham Airport
- Frequent-flyer program: Executive Club
- Alliance: Oneworld
- Parent company: Maersk Air
- Headquarters: Birmingham Airport

Maersk Air Ltd., trading as Maersk Air UK, was a British airline which operated between 1993 and 2003. It flew out of Birmingham Airport to domestic and European destinations under a British Airways franchise agreement. The company was fully owned by the eponymous A. P. Møller–Mærsk Group through its Danish subsidiary airline Maersk Air and was based at Birmingham Airport. At its peak it operated twelve aircraft and had 490 employees.

== History ==
=== Born from a demerger ===
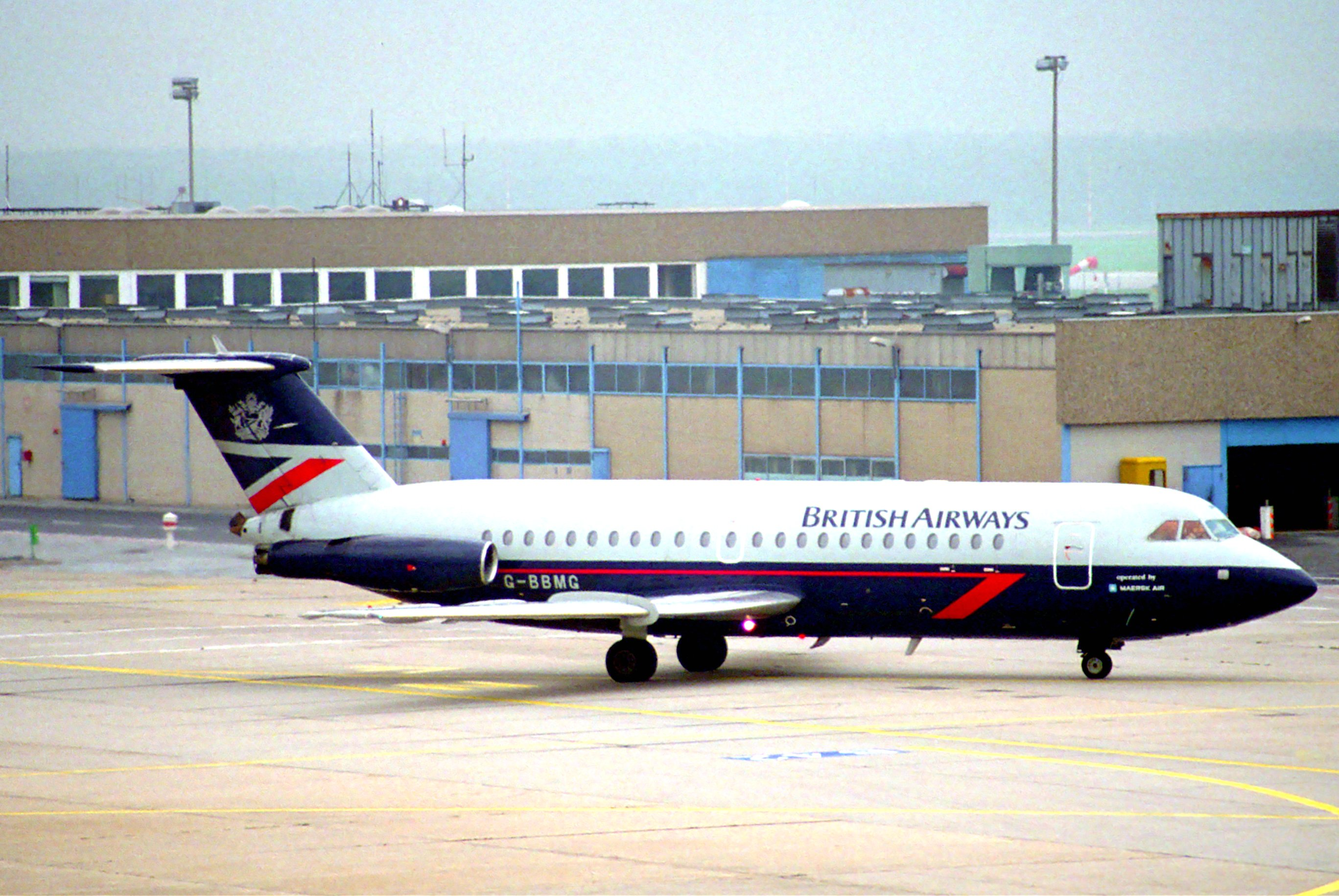
BAC One-Eleven

The airline was created in July 1993 through the demerger of Brymon European Airways, which had been created through the merger of Brymon Airways and Birmingham European Airways. Maersk took over the latter operations, while its co-owner, British Airways, took over the ex-Brymon operations. Maersk Air UK commenced operations on 1 August of that same year inside the British Airways Express brand with a fleet made up by five BAC One-Eleven and three Jetstream 31 aircraft. Routes were flown to Amsterdam, Belfast, Copenhagen, Cork, Dublin, Glasgow, Milan, Newcastle and Stuttgart. As of 1994 the air carrier had 185 employees. The four One-Elevens were sold and replaced with newer Boeing 737-500s. Meanwhile, a Jetstream 41 was transferred from British Airways, replacing the smaller Jetstream 31s. The services to Dublin, Cork and Glasgow were terminated and instead a route was started to Lyon.

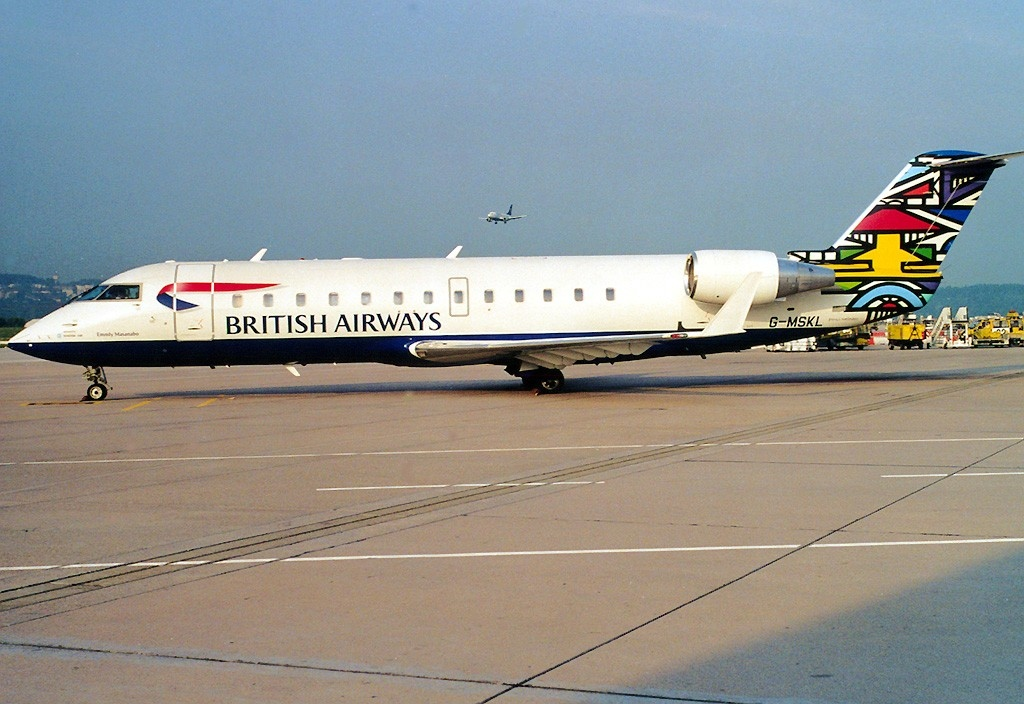
Bombardier CRJ200 at Stuttgart Airport in 1999

=== Growth ===
Maersk Air UK saw its passenger numbers increase by 22% in 1997, ending at 550,000. At the end of the year it operated three One-Elevens and three 737-500s. In November the airline ordered three 50-seat Bombardier Bombardier CRJ200s with an option for a further twelve of any combination of the CRJ200 and the larger 70-seat CRJ700 The first CRJs were delivered in 1998 and by August 1999 there were six such aircraft in the fleet. The One-Eleves were retired in 1998 and the Jetstream 41 was pulled from service the following year. The airline launched services to Geneva and Vienna in February 1999. In November routes were added to Stockholm and Rome. By 1999 the airline had grown to a staff of 347. A year later Berlin, Brussels, Frankfurt and Zürich had been added as destinations and the fleet grown to six 737-500s and six CRJ200s.

By 2001 the number of employees had risen to 490 and the first CRJ700 had been delivered. That year services commenced to Hamburg, Hanover and Marseille. Meanwhile, British Airways was building up at Birmingham Airport through two other franchise agreements, with Brymon Airways and BRAL-British Regional Airlines. The franchise agreement with Maersk, set to expire on 24 March 2001, was extended that month through the summer season. This spurred speculation that Maersk would abandon the franchising agreement. However, in August a five-year extension was signed. From May 2002 the air carrier commenced three new routes, to Bordeaux, Nice, Toulouse, all in France. By then the first two CRJ700s had been delivered, while the number of 737-500s was reduced to three. Services also commenced to Gothenburg, but by then the services to Brussels, Frankfurt, Newcastle, Rome and Zürich had been terminated.

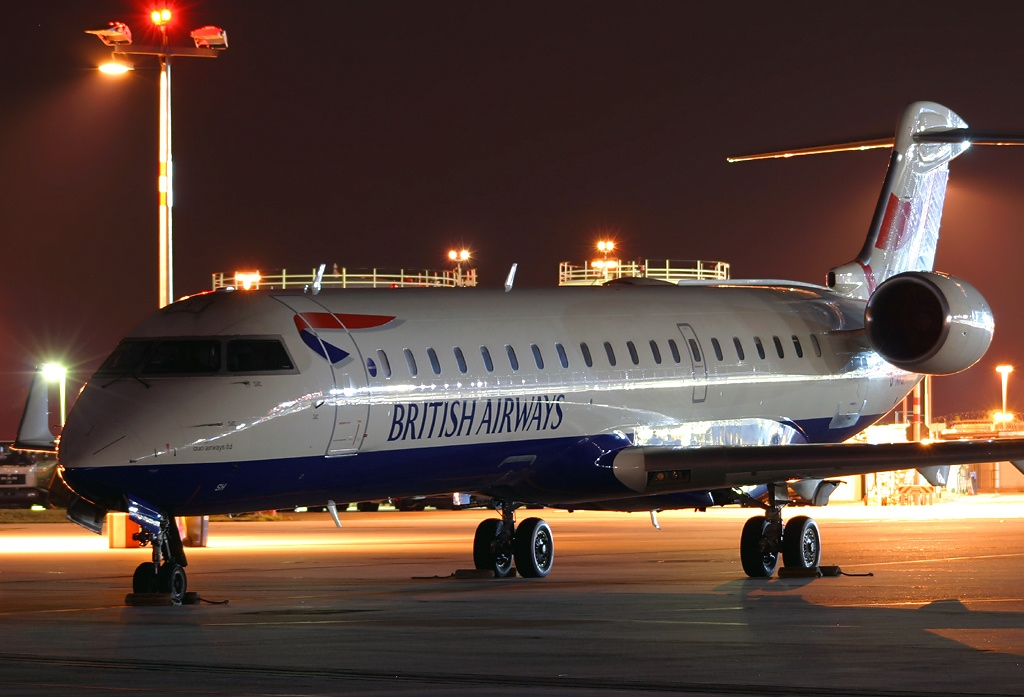
CRJ700 of Duo Airways in 2003

=== Debts and decline ===
From 2000 through 2002 Maersk Air UK lost an accumulative 325 million Danish krone (DKK). By early 2003 the Danish Maersk Group had lost interest in operating an airline in the UK and put the company up for sale. However, there were not interested buyers and it was speculated that British Airways would have to step in and take over the franchise partner. The company was therefore sold in a management buyout in 2003, with the airline becoming Duo Airways. At the time the airline had eight aircraft and 350 employees. Up till this point Maersk Air had lost DKK 250 million on its UK operations. The renamed company folded in 2004, and Maersk Air was forced to bring home five CRJs from Birmingham. Maersk lost a further DKK 65 million with the sale of these aircraft.

== Operations ==
Maersk Air Ltd. was a subsidiary of Maersk Air, a Danish airline again owned by the powerful Maersk Group. Maersk Air UK was headquartered near Birmingham Airport, which served as the airline's only base. The airline operated under a franchise agreement with British Airways, as British Airways Express. It employed the BA branding, including aircraft livery, uniforms, in-flight service and catering, as well as terminal services. It also employed BA's flight codes and reservation system. Flights qualified for miles on BA's frequent-flyer program, Executive Club.

== Destinations ==
The following is a list of destinations served by Maersk Air UK. All scheduled services were flown out of their base at Birmingham Airport and were branded as British Airways flights.

City	Country	Airport	Being	End	Ref
Amsterdam	Netherlands	Amsterdam Airport Schiphol	1993	2003	
Belfast	United Kingdom	Belfast International Airport	1993	2003	
Berlin	Germany		2000	2003	
Birmingham	United Kingdom	Birmingham Airport^{[Base]}	1993	2003	
Bordeaux	France	Bordeaux–Mérignac Airport	2002	2003	
Brussels	Belgium	Brussels Airport	2000	2001	
Copenhagen	Denmark	Copenhagen Airport	1993	2003	
Cork	Ireland	Cork Airport	1993	1996	
Dublin	Ireland	Dublin Airport	1993	1996	
Frankfurt	Germany	Frankfurt Airport	2000	2001	
Geneva	Switzerland	Geneva International Airport	1999	2003	
Glasgow	United Kingdom	Glasgow Airport	1993	1996	
Gothenburg	Sweden	Göteborg Landvetter Airport	2002	2003	
Hamburg	Germany	Hamburg Airport	2001	2003	
Hanover	Germany	Hannover Airport	2001	2003	
Lyon	France	Lyon Airport	1996	2003	
Marseille	France	Marseille Airport	2001	2001	
Milan	Italy		1993	2003	
Nice	France	Nice Côte d'Azur Airport	2002	2003	
Newcastle	United Kingdom	Newcastle Airport	1993	2001	
Rome	Italy	Leonardo da Vinci–Fiumicino Airport	1999	2001	
Stockholm	Sweden	Stockholm Arlanda Airport	1999	2003	
Stuttgart	Germany	Stuttgart Airport	1993	2003	
Toulouse	France	Toulouse–Blagnac Airport	2002	2003	
Venice	Italy	Venice Marco Polo Airport	1999	2003	
Zürich	Switzerland	Zurich Airport	2000	2001	

== Fleet ==
The following is a list of aircraft types operated by Maersk Air UK. The airline did not own any of their aircraft themselves; instead, these were leased from its parent company.

Maersk Air UK aircraft
Aircraft	Qty.	Intro	Retired	Ref.
British Aerospace 1-11-400	4	1993	1998	
British Aerospace 1-11-500	2	1993	1998	
British Aerospace Jetstream 31	3	1993	1996	
British Aerospace Jetstream 41	1	1996	1999	
Boeing 737-500	6	1996	2002	
Bombardier CRJ200	10	1999	2003	
Bombardier CRJ700	5	2002	2003	

== See also ==
- List of defunct airlines of the United Kingdom

== Bibliography ==
- Ellemose, Søren (2009). Luftens helte (in Danish). Aarhus: Jyllands-Posten Forlag. ISBN 978-87-7692-197-2.
