= Grumman Gulfstream I =

1958 executive aircraft by Grumman

Gulfstream I
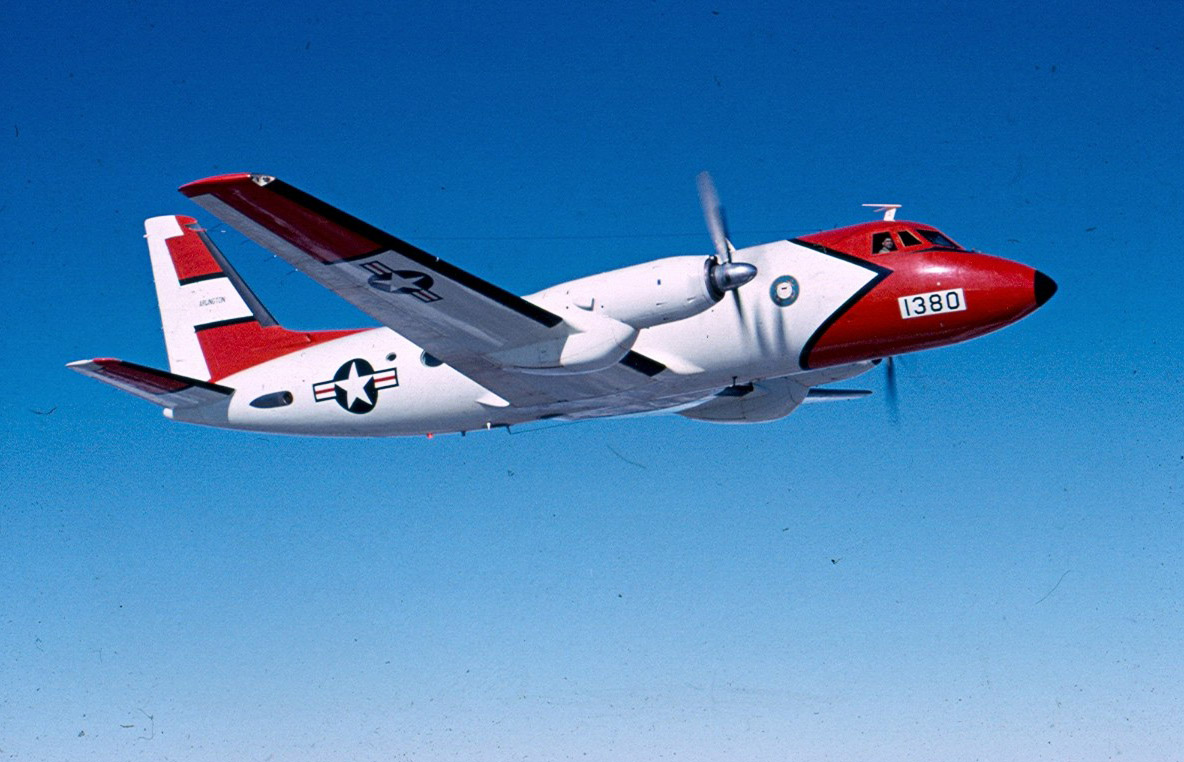
- USCG VC-4A Gulfstream I in flight, 1964

General information
- Type: Business aircraft
- National origin: United States
- Manufacturer: Grumman
- Number built: 200

History
- Manufactured: 1959–1969
- First flight: August 14, 1958

The Grumman Gulfstream I (company designation G-159) is a twin-turboprop business aircraft. It first flew on August 14, 1958.

== Design and development ==
After first rejecting an idea to develop the Grumman Widgeon as an executive transport, the company studied producing an executive transport based on a turbine-powered variant of the naval utility transport Grumman TF-1 Trader. The company had already determined that any new aircraft would have to be turboprop-powered and the Rolls-Royce Dart engine was chosen. Further studies showed that the Trader-based design would not sell and they needed an all-new design with a low-wing and room to stand up in the cabin. In June 1957 the design of G-159 was finalised and Grumman started selling slots on the production line at $10,000 each. The initial customers worked with Grumman on the detailed design and avionics fit. The G-159 was given the name Gulfstream and on 14 August 1958 the first aircraft, registered N701G, took off from Bethpage, New York on its maiden flight. By 2 May 1959 the aircraft was awarded a type certificate by the Federal Aviation Administration (FAA).

The Gulfstream I is a low-wing cantilever monoplane with a semi-monocoque aluminium alloy fuselage structure. The aircraft is powered by two Rolls-Royce Dart turboprops with Rotol four-bladed constant speed propellers. The Gulfstream I has a retractable tricycle landing gear, with twin wheels on the two main units and the nose gear. The cabin is designed to take up to twenty-four passengers in a high-density arrangement or only eight in an executive layout, although ten to twelve was more usual. The aircraft has a hydraulically operated airstair in the forward cabin for entry and exit.

A single Gulfstream I was delivered to the United States Coast Guard (USCG) in 1963, outfitted as an executive transport and designated the VC-4A. Around this time, the United States Navy (USN) proposed to purchase the Gulfstream I as a navigation trainer and a multirole trainer/transport, designating the new variants as the T-41A and TC-4B respectively; however, the purchase was deferred. The USN finally purchased nine navigation trainers in 1966 as the TC-4C Academe; these were used to train bombardier/navigators for the A-6 Intruder. The USCG VC-4A was transferred to the Aircraft Repair and Supply Center (ARSC) at Coast Guard Air Station Elizabeth City in 1983, and was later used as a logistics and long-range command and control aircraft until 2001; it was scrapped in 2002. Another Gulfstream I was transferred to the USCG from NASA in 2001 as a replacement; this second VC-4A was returned to NASA in 2004.

A 37-passenger stretched version, the G-159C, was developed by Gulfstream for regional airline use. Five were delivered from November 1980. Air North (based in Plattsburgh NY and which subsequently changed its name to Brockway Air) was one of the few airlines in the U.S. to use this version before its acquisition by Brockway Glass. Another Gulfstream I-C airline operator was Chaparral Airlines which flew passenger services as American Eagle via a codesharing agreement with American Airlines. Royale Airlines also operated the G-I in scheduled passenger service in the U.S. operating as Continental Connection on behalf of Continental Airlines; however, its aircraft were standard length G-159 models and thus were not the stretched version. Several other airlines in the U.S. as well. Air carriers in Africa, Canada, Europe and the Mideast also operated standard Gulfstream Is in scheduled passenger service, including Peregrine Air Services in the U.K., which operated airline flights for British Airways.

== Operational history ==
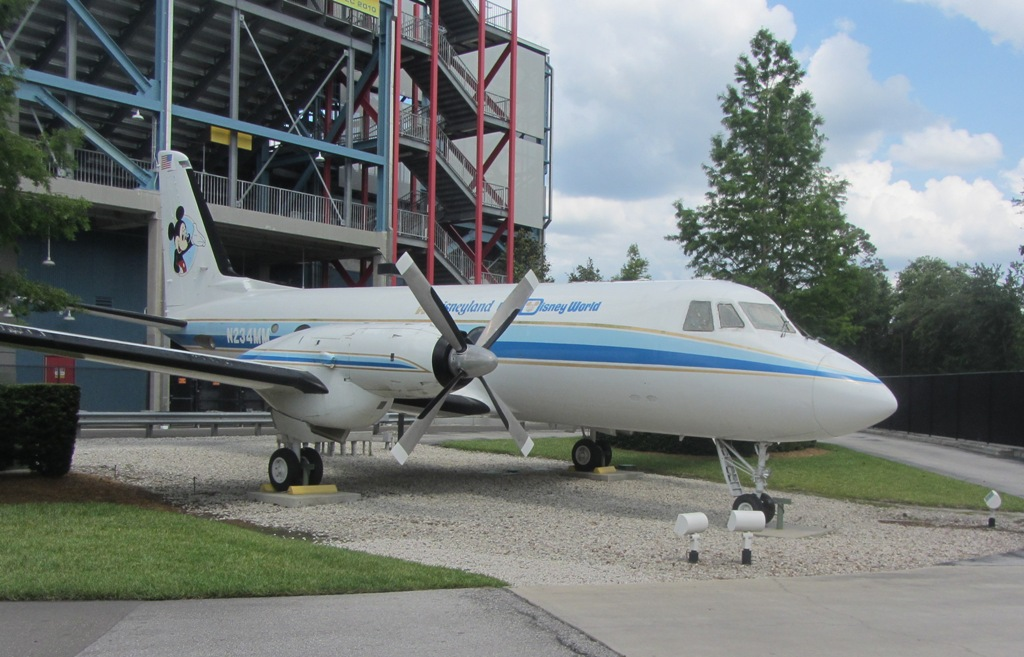
Walt Disney Company G-I on display in Florida

As of August 2006, a total of 44 Grumman Gulfstream I aircraft remained in service. The major operator is Phoenix Air in the United States with 13 aircraft. Some 19 other airlines also operate the type. A G-I purchased by Walt Disney in 1964 and last flown on Oct. 8, 1992 was on display at Disney's Hollywood Studios and is set to be moved to Palm Springs Air Museum. The aircraft logged 8800 flights and 20,000 flight hours with notable passengers Richard Nixon, Ronald Reagan, Jimmy Carter, Julie Andrews, Hugh O'Brian, and Annette Funicello. The Broadcasting Board of Governors operated a Gulfstream I as an airborne broadcasting studio for Radio y Televisión Martí in international airspace near Cuba from 2006 to 2013.

== Variants ==
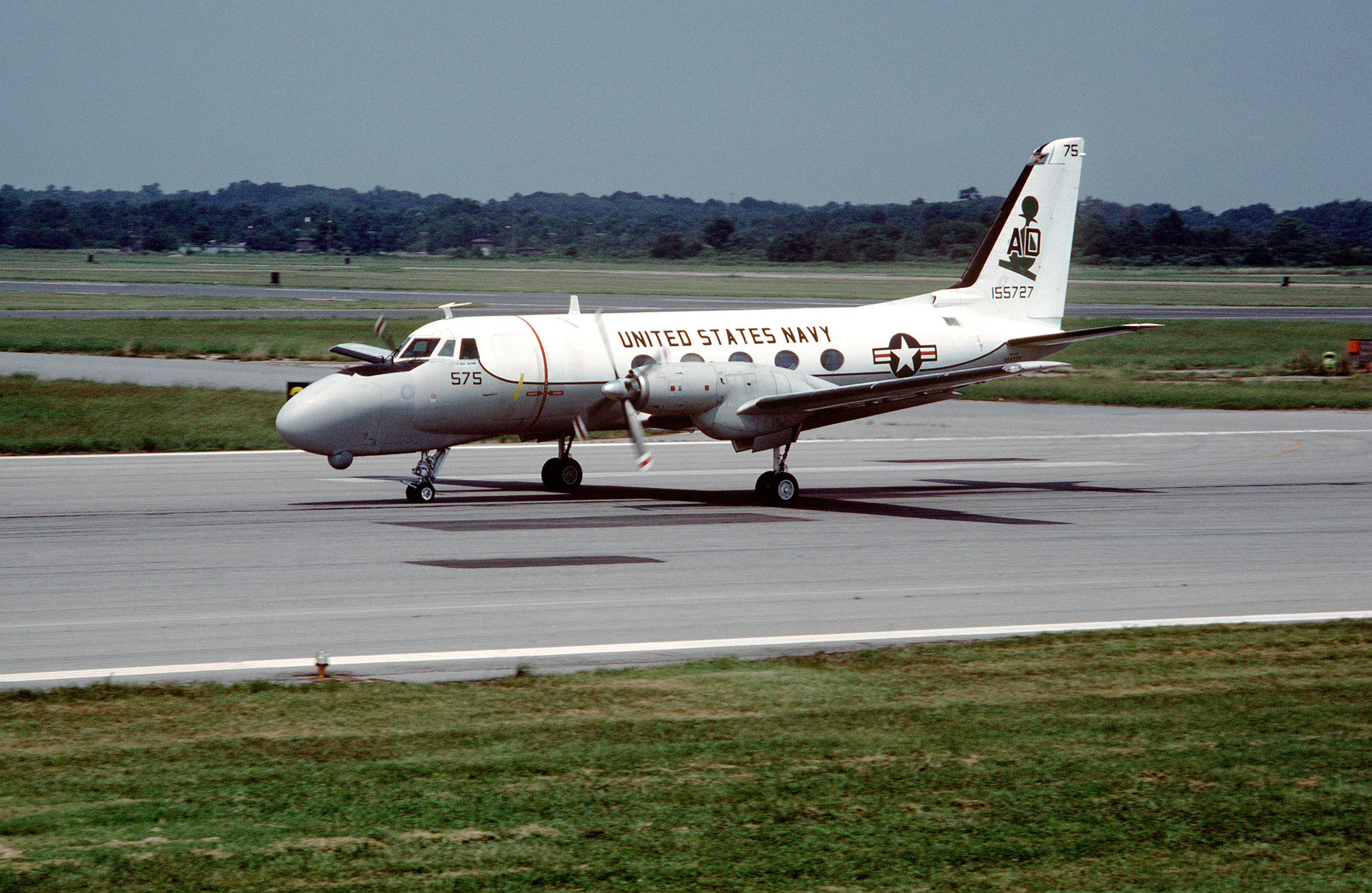
A U.S. Navy TC-4C Academe from VA-42 at NAS Oceana, 1989.

G-159 Gulfstream I
Twin-engined executive, corporate transport aircraft with accommodation for up to 14 passengers, powered by two 2,210-shp (1648-kW) Rolls-Royce Dart RDa.7/2 Mk 529-8X turboprop engines. 200 built.
G-159C Gulfstream I-C
Stretched regional airline version. Five G-I aircraft were converted into Gulfstream I-Cs, by having the fuselage lengthened by 10 ft 8 in (3.25 m) to provide seating for up to 37 passengers.
T-41A
Pre-production US Navy designation for navigation trainer variant. Redesignated TC-4C. (Note: The T-41A designation was reassigned to the initial production variant of the Cessna T-41 Mescalero.)
VC-4A
VIP transport version for the US Coast Guard. One built, one transferred from NASA.
TC-4B
Pre-production US Navy designation for trainer/transport variant. Purchase canceled.
TC-4C Academe

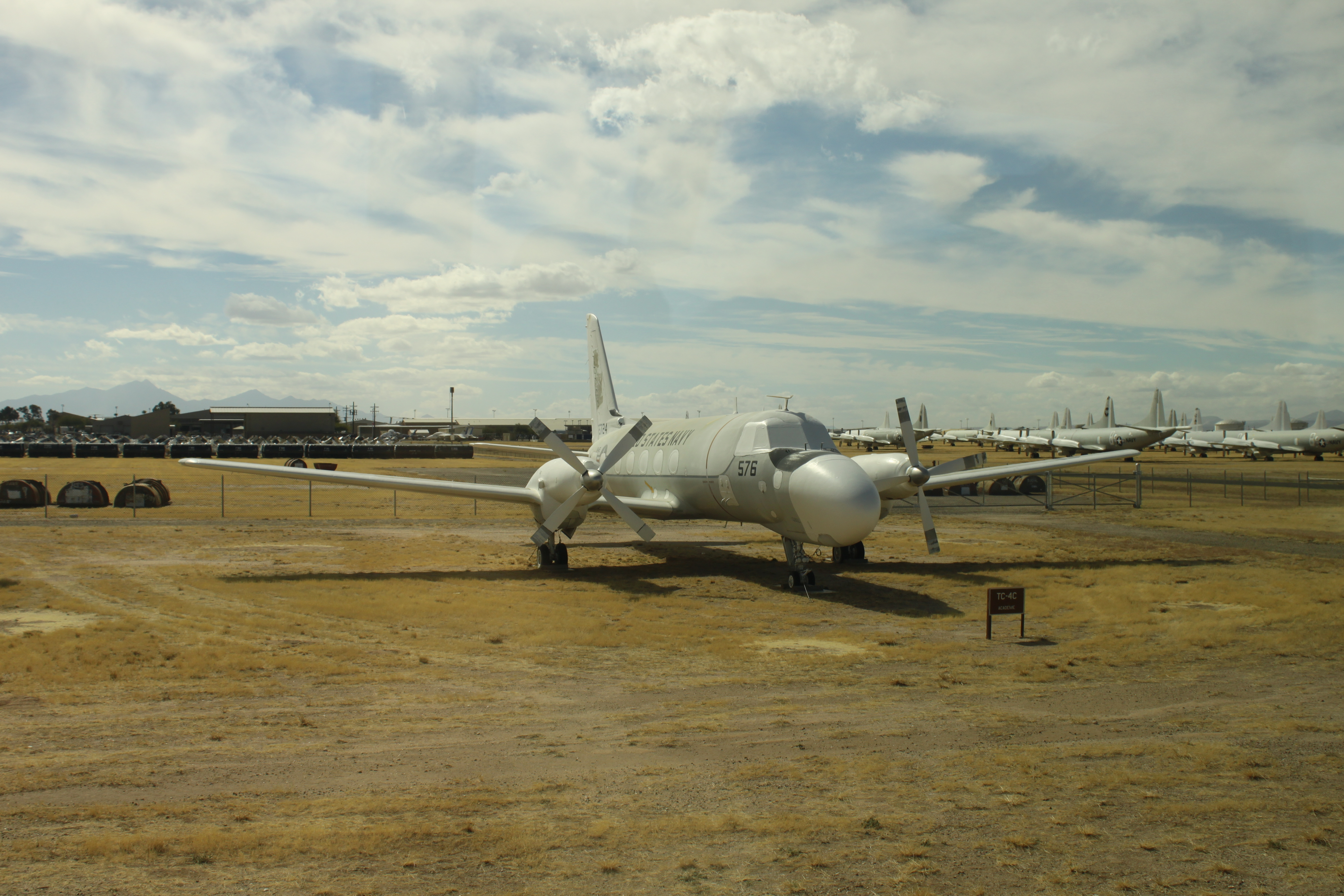
TC-4C aircraft used by VA-42 at Davis-Monthan in 2018

Trainer for US Navy and Marine Corps A-6 Intruder bombardier/navigators, nine ordered in 1966, first flown in 1967. Aircraft were fitted with an A-6 nose radome, a simulated A-6 cockpit and four bombardier/navigator consoles. The aircraft used by VA-42 was last seen in 2018 at the Davis-Monthan Air Force Base, 309th Aerospace Maintenance and Regeneration Group (AMARG). The "Green Pawn" emblem is still visible on the tail.

== Operators ==
Most of the 200 Gulfstream I propjets were operated by corporate customers, with a smaller number operated by regional or commuter airlines as well as by government agencies and the military. NASA, the U.S. space agency, flew the Gulfstream I as a passenger transport aircraft and operated seven G-Is. Throughout the 1970s and mid-80s the Ford Motor Company operated a G-1 for their executives in Brazil. The Walt Disney Company operated Gulfstream S.N. 121 with the factory assigned tail number N732G from December of 1963 to October 4, 1967, when it was changed to N234MM.

=== Civilian operators ===
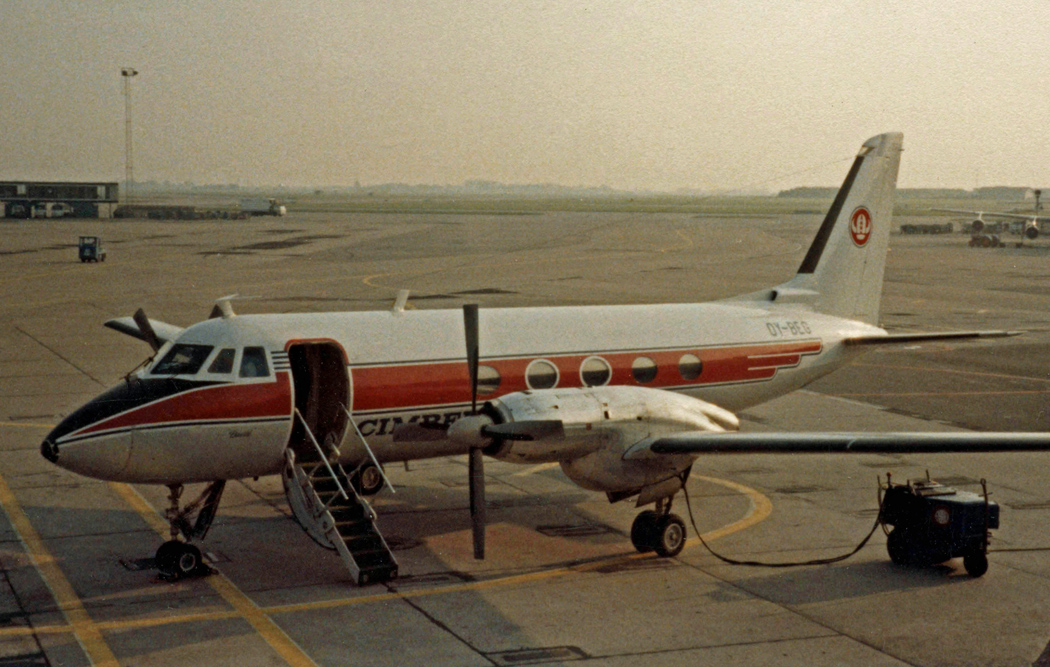
Gulfstream I of Cimber Air operating a scheduled service from Copenhagen Airport in 1981

Canada

- Ptarmigan Airways - Former scheduled passenger airline operator.
- Wardair

Denmark

- Cimber Air - Former scheduled passenger airline operator.

(Democratic Republic of the Congo) Democratic Republic of Congo

- Malu Aviation

France

- Air Provence - Former scheduled passenger airline operator.

Gabon

- Gabon Express - Former scheduled passenger airline operator.

Israel

- Aeroel Airways - Former scheduled passenger airline operator.

Kenya

- East African Safari Air - Former scheduled passenger airline operator.
- Kenya Flamingo Airways - Former scheduled passenger airline operator.

Spain

- Seven Air - Former scheduled passenger airline operator.

Sweden

- Swedish Civil Aviation Administration (CAA) - Flight inspection (Radio Navigational Aids).

United Kingdom

- Aberdeen Airways - Former scheduled passenger airline operator.
- Birmingham European Airways - Former scheduled passenger airline operator.
- Birmingham Executive Airways - Former scheduled passenger airline operator.
- British Airways - Former scheduled passenger airline feeder service operated via contract by Peregrine Air Services.
- Capital Airlines - Former scheduled passenger airline operator.

United States

- Air North - Former scheduled passenger airline operator of the stretched, 37-passenger Gulfstream I-C. Air North, which operated in the northeast U.S., subsequently changed its name to Brockway Air.
- Air US - Former scheduled passenger airline operator flying several commuter routes from Denver Stapleton International Airport (DEN). Fleet included stretched, 37-passenger Gulfstream I-C aircraft.
- Bonanza Air Lines - Former scheduled passenger airline operator.
- Chaparral Airlines - Former scheduled passenger airline operator of the stretched, 37-passenger Gulfstream I-C. Chaparral operated as American Eagle providing passenger feed for the American Airlines hub located at the Dallas/Fort Worth International Airport (DFW).
- Coleman Air Transport - Former scheduled passenger airline operator which operated a small hub at the Chicago Rockford International Airport (RFD) in Illinois.

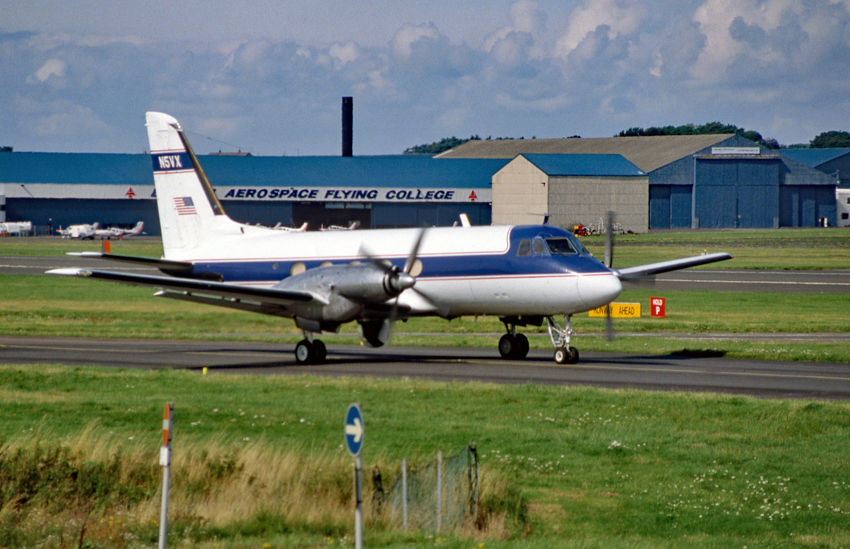
Nasa G-I at Prestwick, 1989

- NASA - Former operator with seven G-I aircraft being used to transport NASA and space program contractor personnel between the civilian space agency's various centers and facilities in the U.S.

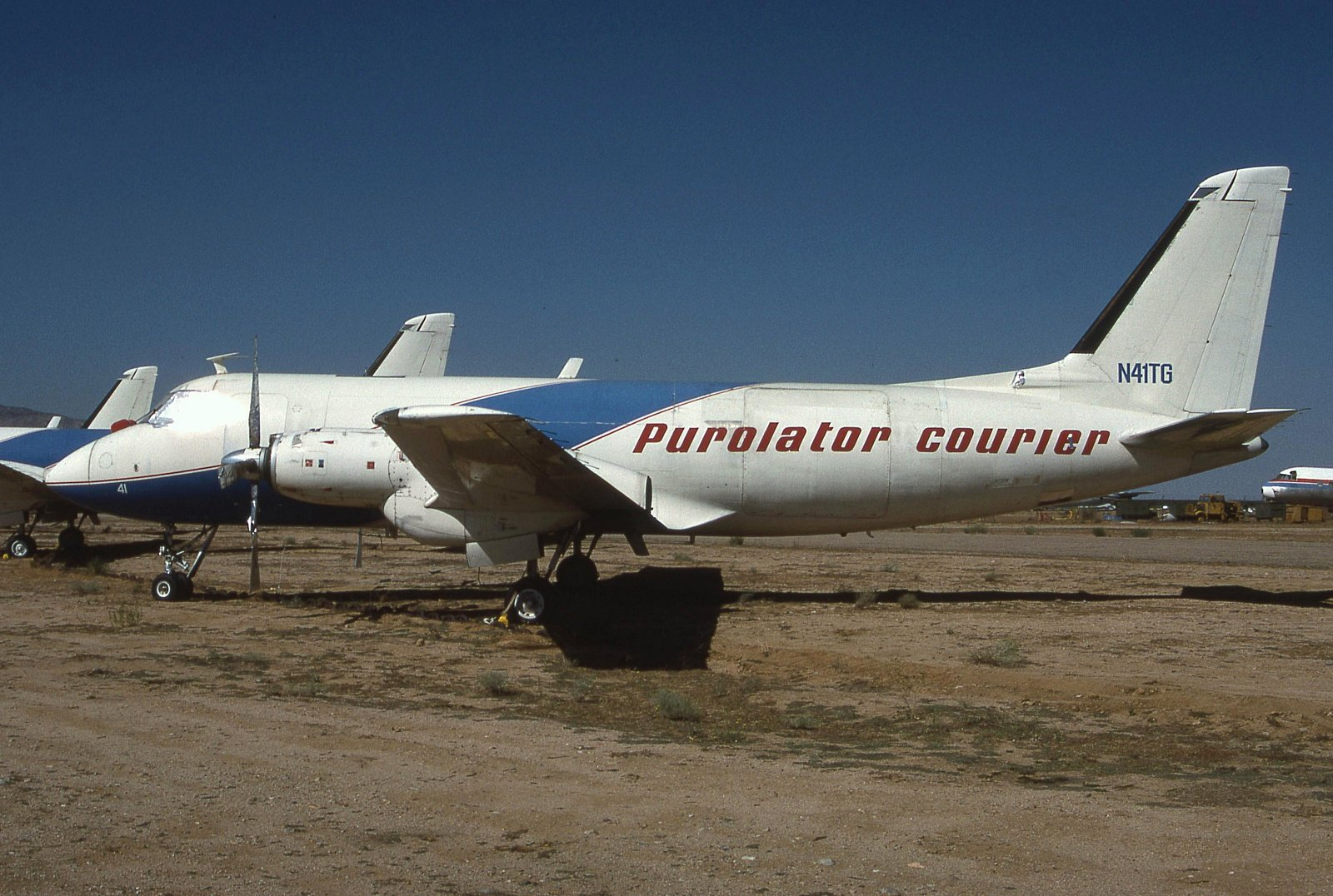
Ex-Orion, ex-General freighter stored at Mojave 1988, freighter door clearly visible

- Orion Air/General Aviation - the parent company of these two airlines, The Aviation Group (TAG), acquired and improved a supplemental type certificate to install a freighter door on a G-159, converting "at least nine". Orion had nine of these aircraft in 1981 which it operated for air freight/package express companies like Emery and Purolator. It later passed the aircraft to its regional affiliate, the generically-named General Aviation which had seven in 1987, six under contract to Purolator.
- Phoenix Air
- Royale Airlines - Former scheduled passenger airline operator with some flights operated via a code-sharing agreement with Continental Airlines providing passenger feed for the Continental hub located at Houston Intercontinental Airport (IAH).
- Scenic Air - Former scheduled passenger airline operator with service from Oakland International Airport (OAK).
- Southeast Airlines - Former scheduled passenger airline operator.
- Susquehanna Airlines - Former scheduled passenger airline operator.
- Zantop Airways/Aviation - Operated in freighter service but apparently without a cargo door

=== Military operators ===
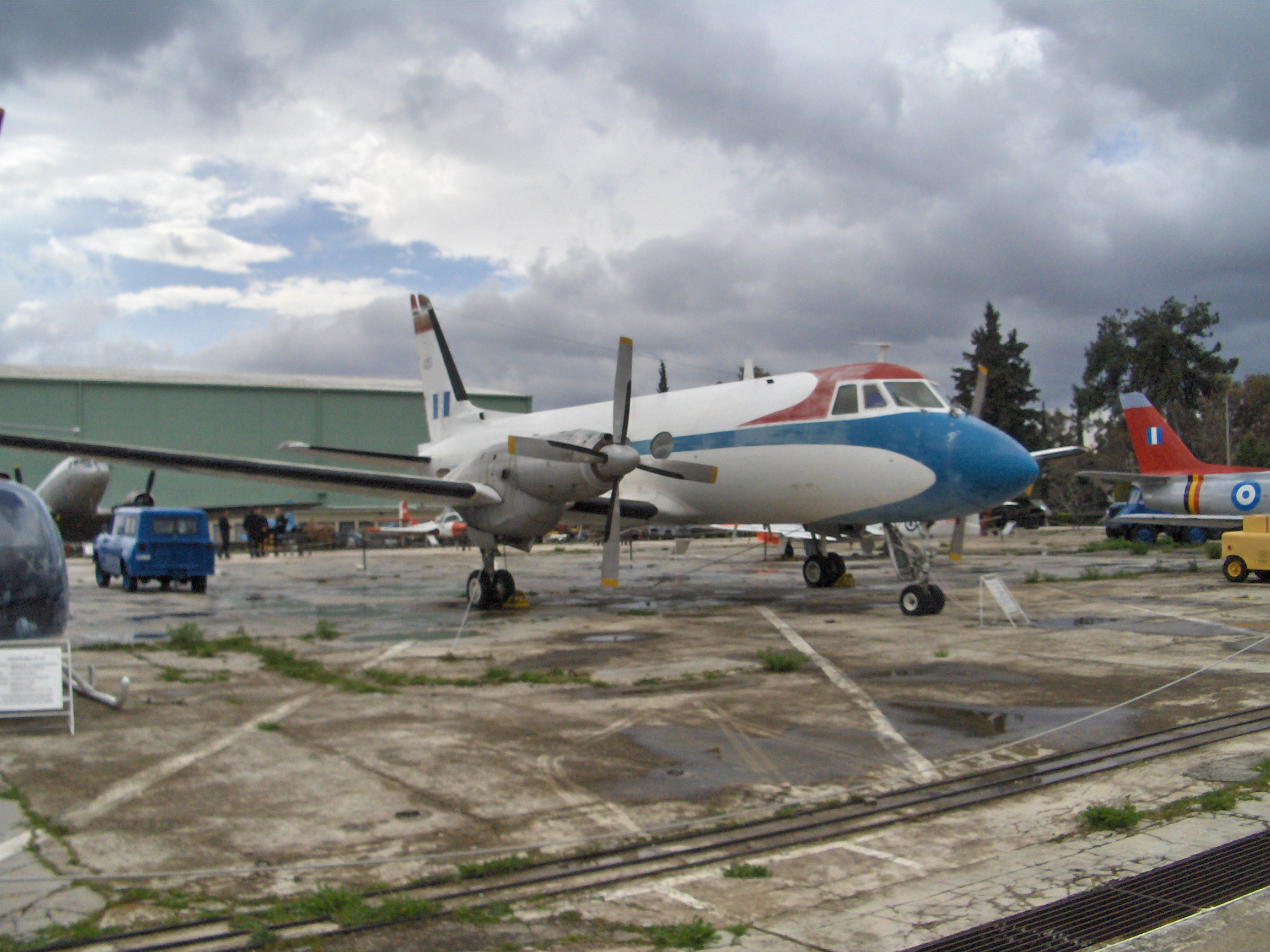
G-159 at the Hellenic Air Force Museum at Dekelia (Tatoi), Athens, Greece

Greece

- Hellenic Air Force - One aircraft delivered in July 1964, now preserved at Dekelia Air Base.

United States

- United States Army - The United States Army Corps of Engineers operated a single Gulfstream I (with a civilian colour scheme and registration) between 1961 and 1981. The US Army also later received at least one Gulfstream I that had been confiscated from drug dealers.
- United States Coast Guard
- United States Marine Corps
- United States Navy

== Specifications ==
Data from Jane's All The World's Aircraft 1965–66

General characteristics

- Crew: 2
- Capacity: 10–24 passengers / 4,270 lb (1,937 kg) maximum payload
- Length: 63 ft 9 in (19.43 m)
- Wingspan: 78 ft 6 in (23.93 m)
- Height: 22 ft 9 in (6.93 m)
- Wing area: 610.3 sq ft (56.70 m^{2})
- Aspect ratio: 10
- Airfoil: root: NACA 63A-214; tip: NACA 63A-314
- Empty weight: 21,900 lb (9,934 kg) equipped
- Maximum zero-fuel weight: 26,170 lb (11,871 kg)
- Max takeoff weight: 35,100 lb (15,921 kg)
- Maximum landing weight: 33,600 lb (15,241 kg)
- Fuel capacity: 1,550 US gal (1,290.6 imp gal; 5,867.4 L) in integral wing tanks
- Powerplant: 2 × Rolls-Royce Dart Mk.529 or Mk.529-8E turboprop, 2,190 shp (1,630 kW) each equivalent
- Propellers: 4-bladed Rotol constant-speed fully-feathering propellers

Performance

- Cruise speed: 348 mph (560 km/h, 302 kn) maximum cruise, at 25,000 ft (7,600 m) at MTOW

288 mph (250 kn; 463 km/h) economical cruise, at 25,000 ft (7,600 m) at MTOW

- Approach speed; 128 mph (111 kn; 206 km/h)
- Range: 2,540 mi (4,090 km, 2,210 nmi) with max. fuel, 2,740 lb (1,243 kg) payload, 45 minutes hold and 200 mi (174 nmi; 322 km) diversion
- Service ceiling: 33,600 ft (10,200 m)
- Rate of climb: 1,900 ft/min (9.7 m/s)
- Wing loading: 57.2 lb/sq ft (279 kg/m^{2})
- Take-off run: 2,550 ft (777 m)
- Take-off distance to 50 ft (15 m): 2,875 ft (876 m)
- Landing run: 1,525 ft (465 m)
- Landing distance from 50 ft (15 m): 2,125 ft (648 m)
- FAA take-off field length: 4,350 ft (1,326 m)
- FAA landing field length: 4,000 ft (1,219 m)

== See also ==
Related development

- Grumman Gulfstream II
- Gulfstream III

Aircraft of comparable role, configuration, and era

- Beechcraft King Air
- Dassault Hirondelle
- Hawker Siddeley HS 748

Related lists

- List of military aircraft of the United States
