= Brymon European Airways =

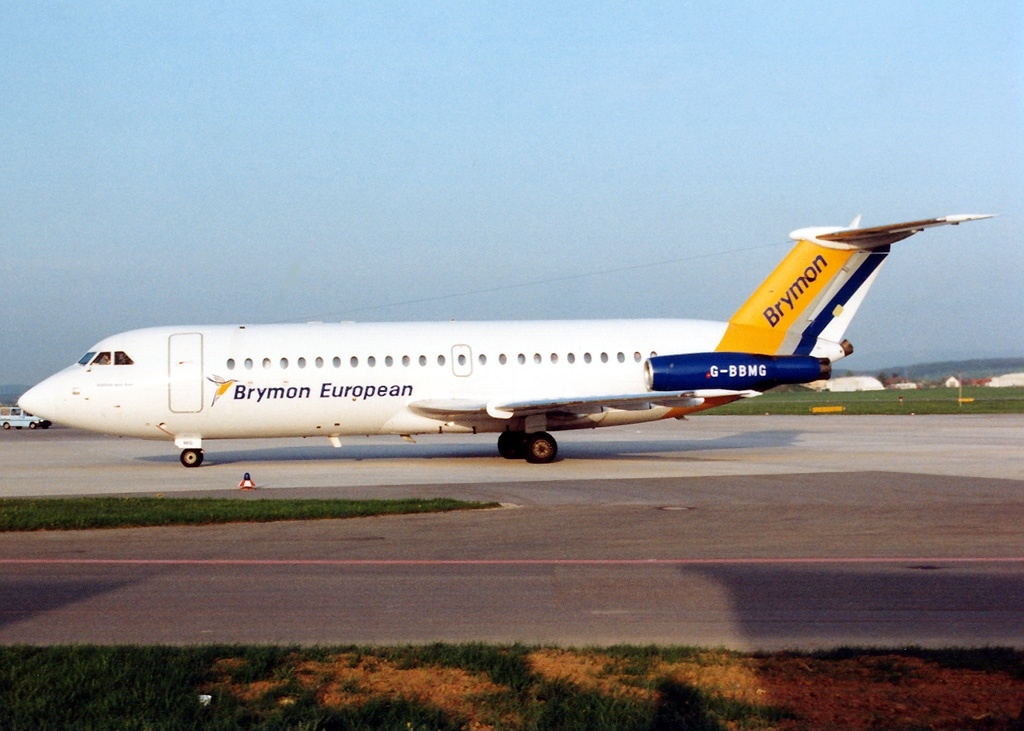
- BAC 1-11-408EF
- Founded: November 1992
- Commenced operations: November 1992
- Ceased operations: 1993

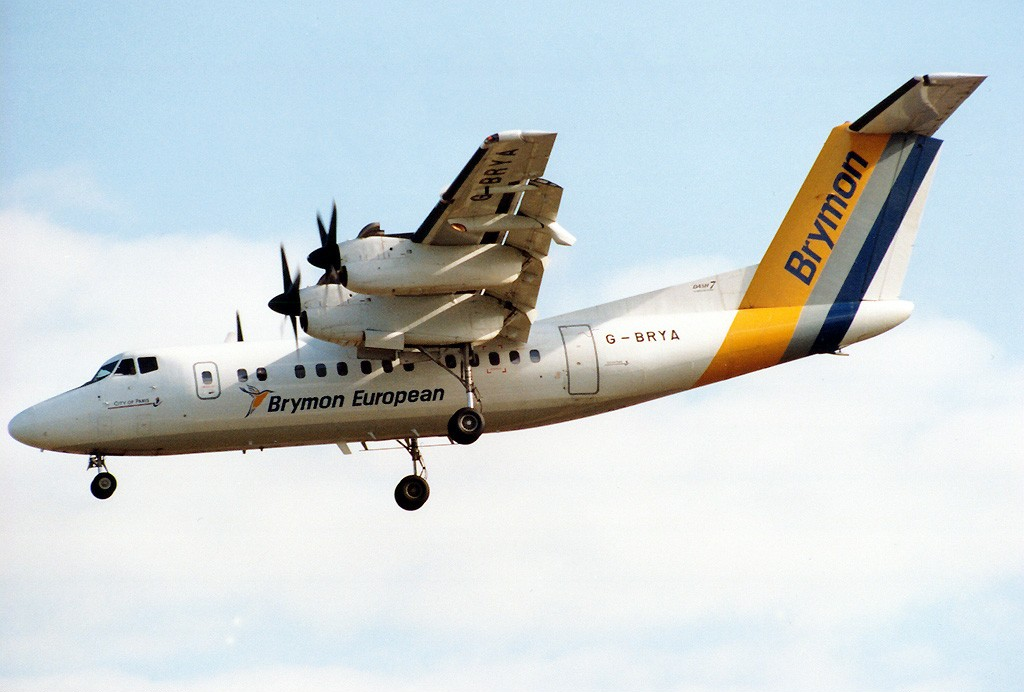
de Havilland Canada DHC-7 Dash 7 in 1993

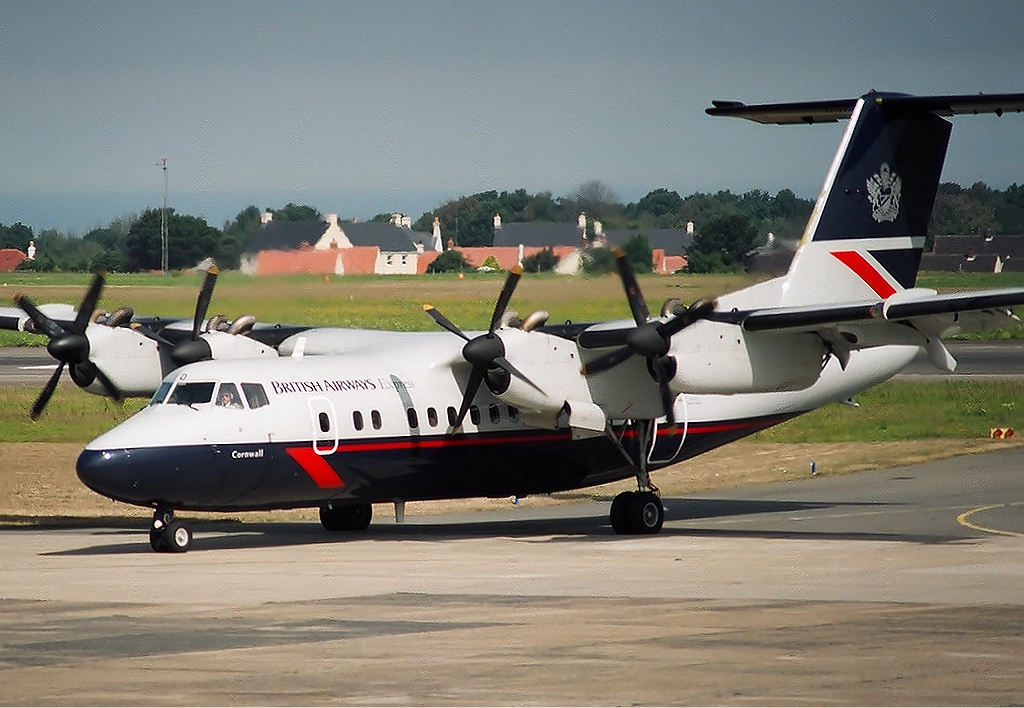
de Havilland Canada DHC-7 Dash 7 in full British Airways livery

In October 1992, Brymon Airways merged its operations with those of Birmingham European Airways under Brymon European Airways brand. The former was the first operator of the Dash 7 four-engine turboprop regional airliner in the UK and conducted the trials of the type at the embryonic London City Airport.

The dual operation turned to be uneasy and was short-lived. In mid-1993 it was bought, with two separate actions, by British Airways and Maersk Air. British Airways acquired a large minority shareholding in the company and appointed Charles Stuart as chief executive and the then Sir Colin Marshall as chairman. At the same time Maersk Air bought the Birmingham European Airways operations and renamed it Maersk Air UK. British Airways allowed Brymon to keep the corporate name but its aircraft were repainted in British Airways Express colours.
