= Brymon Airways =

Regional airline of the United Kingdom (1970–2007)

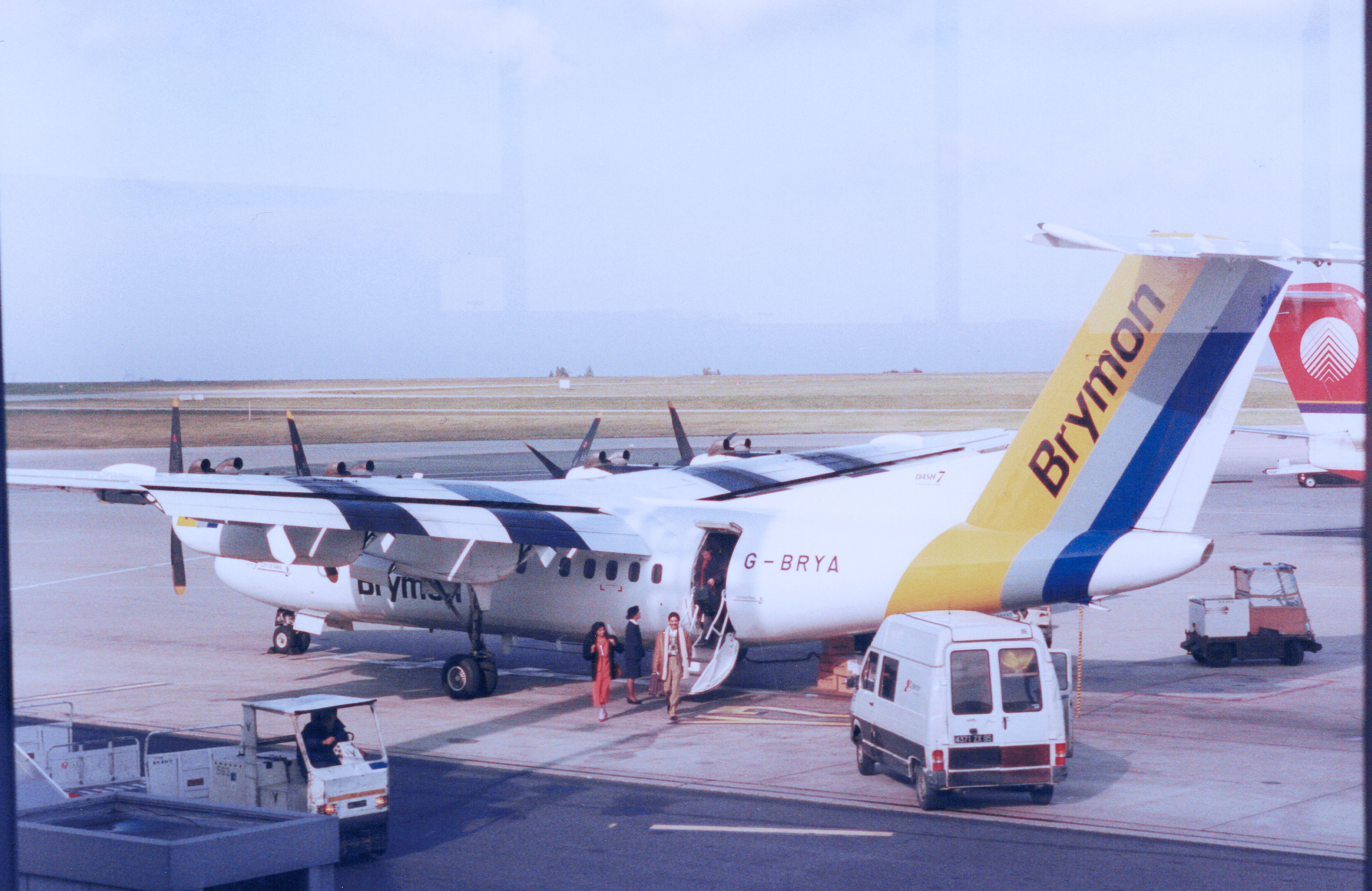
- DHC-7 Dash 7
IATA	ICAO	Call sign
BC	BRY	BRYMON
- Founded: 26 January 1970
- Ceased operations: 2007
- Operating bases: Bristol; Newcastle upon Tyne; Plymouth
- Fleet size: 48 (Total)
- Headquarters: Plymouth City Airport; Plymouth, Devon, England
- Key people: Chris Amon; Bill Bryce

Brymon Airways was a British airline with its head office in the Brymon House on the property of Plymouth City Airport in Plymouth, Devon. It was co-founded in 1972 by journalist Bill Bryce and racing driver Chris Amon.

== History ==
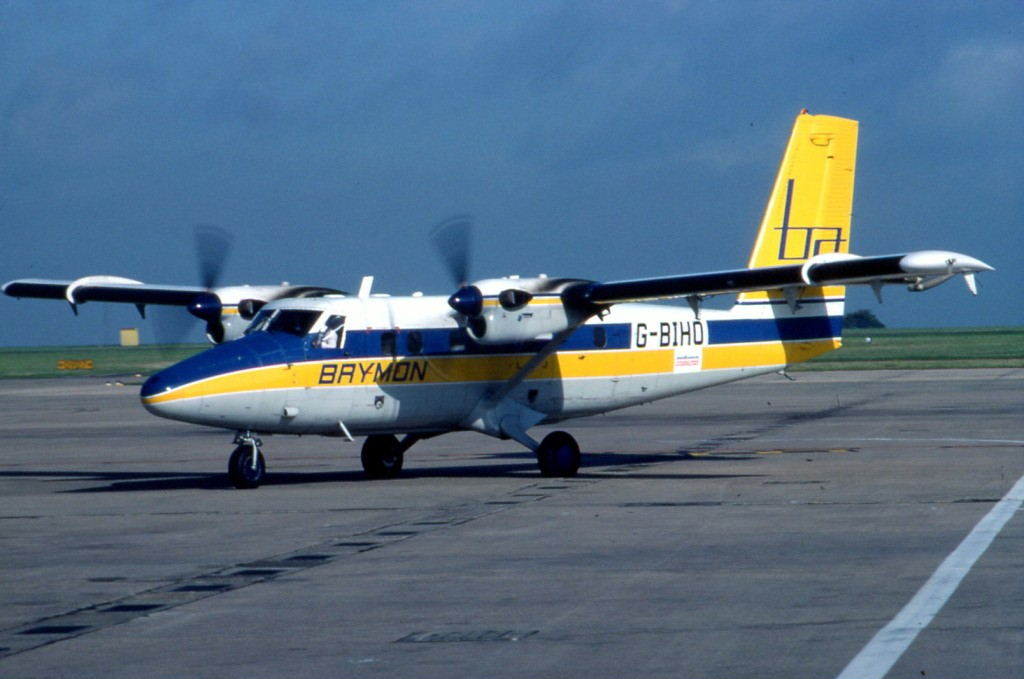
de Havilland Canada DHC-6 Twin Otter at East Midlands Airport in 1984

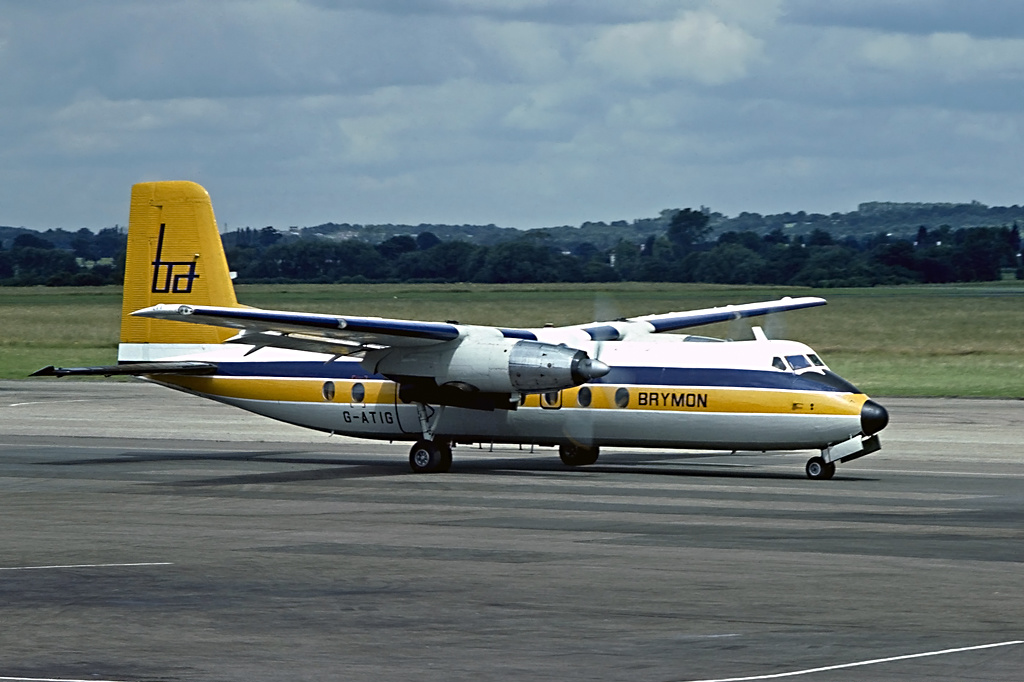
Handley Page Herald at London Southend Airport in 1980

The company was incorporated in March 1969 as Brymon Aviation Limited but in 1973 the most acceptable brand Brymon Airways started being used. The name derived from its creator's surnames: Bryce and Amon. At the beginning, only on-demand activities were carried out, but on 15 June 1972 the first scheduled flights began. Brymon quickly built up a network of routes from its bases at Plymouth and Newquay, to various UK airports (including the Channel Islands, the Isles of Scilly, London (Heathrow and Gatwick) and some foreign destinations such as France.

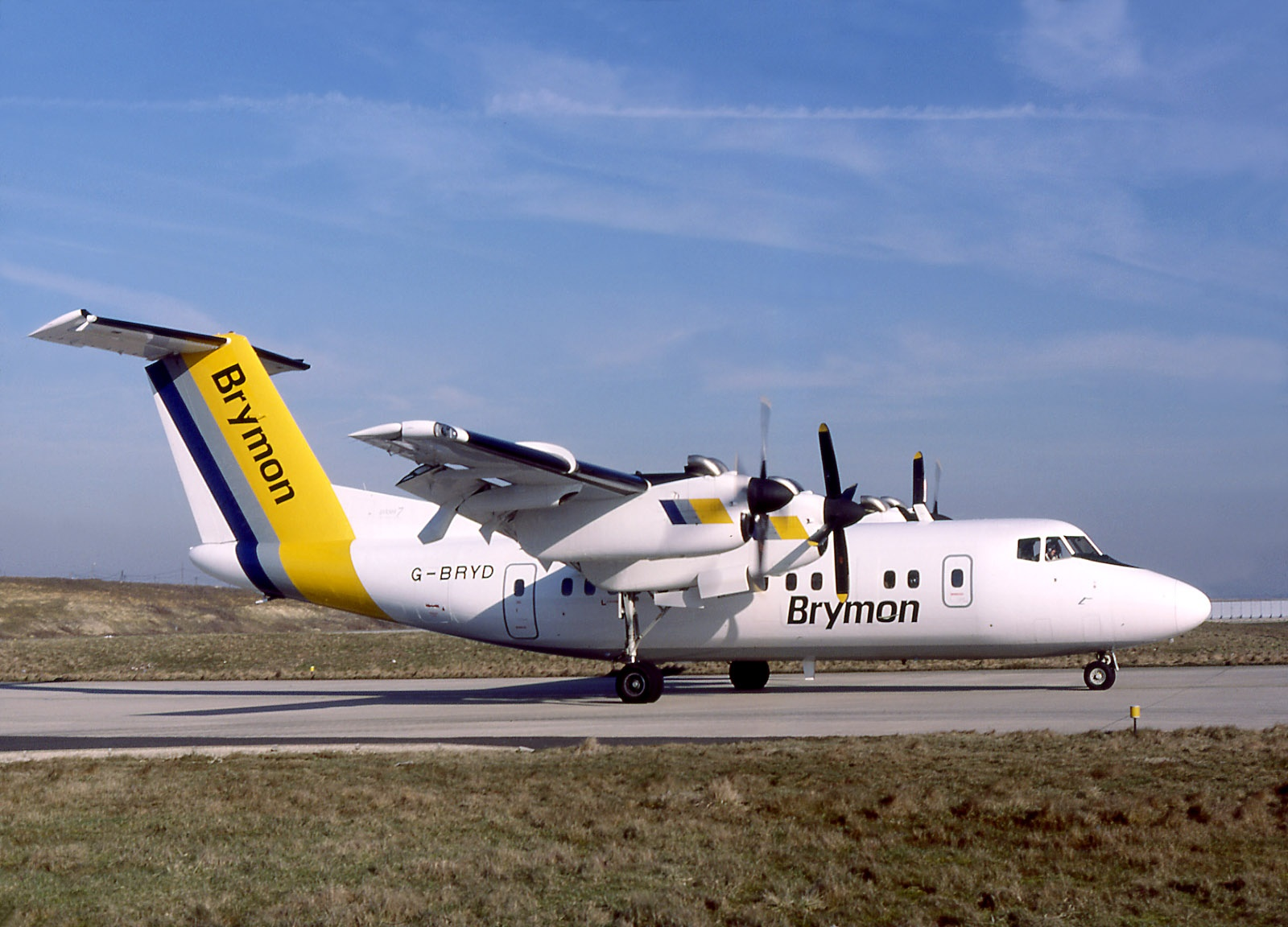
De Havilland Canada Dash 7 seen at Paris-Charles de Gaulle Airport in 1988

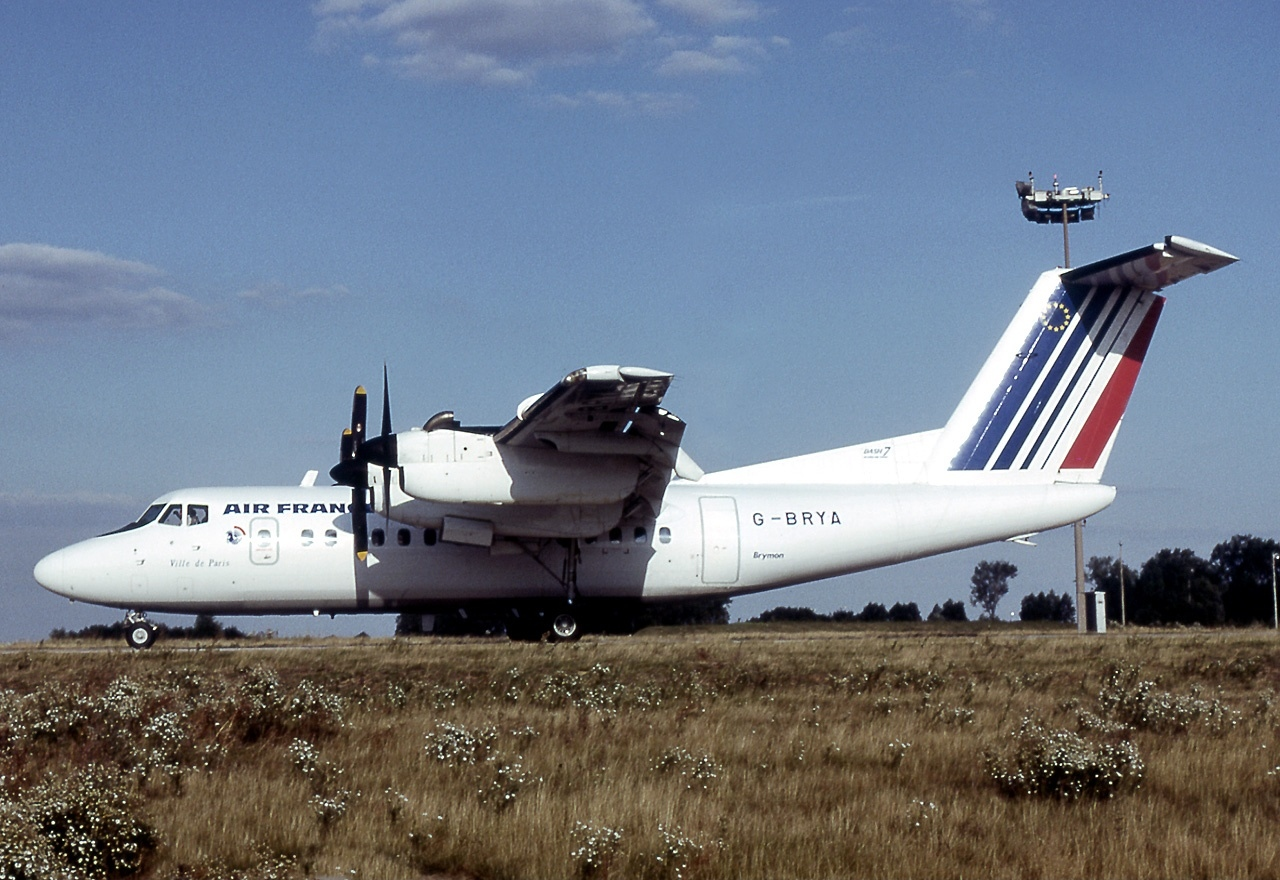
De Havilland Canada Dash 7 in full Air France livery as per joint operations

In 1981, it was the first UK airline to operate the de Havilland Canada Dash 7. Four aircraft were acquired, two used from Aberdeen airport on contract for a consortium led by Chevron Oil and two flown from Plymouth, including the first ever scheduled service to Heathrow. In June 1982, a Brymon Dash 7 flew into Heron Quays in Millwall, paving the way for London City Airport. A further test flight took place the following year as part of a public enquiry. Brymon was the lead airline in the quest for the airport and made the first ever landing in 1987. Together with its partner Air France, Brymon introduced the airport's first services in November 1987.

Chris Amon was never involved in the day-to-day running of the airline and Bill Bryce resigned towards the end of 1984. In 1991 Brymon expanded even further, establishing a hub at Bristol, with services to Paris, Cork, The Channel Islands, Edinburgh, Glasgow, Plymouth, and a service to Newcastle and Aberdeen.

In October 1992, Brymon Airways merged its operations with those of Birmingham European Airways under Brymon European Airways brand. This was bought jointly by British Airways and Maersk Air, in mid-1993. British Airways acquired a large minority shareholding in the company and appointed Charles Stuart as chief executive and the then Sir Colin Marshall as chairman. At the same time Maersk Air bought the Birmingham European Airways operations. Maersk Air renamed Birmingham European Airways Maersk Air UK, but British Airways allowed Brymon to keep its name. Having established this, Brymon's aircraft were repainted in British Airways Express colours. On 30 July 1993 the company was renamed Brymon Airways Limited to reflect the operating name and in August started operating under British Airways Express brand. Around this time the regional air carrier initiated a service from Newcastle to Paris.

Further expansion occurred in 1998, when it took over British Airways regional services from Aberdeen to Birmingham and Manchester.It also introduced routes from Manchester to Edinburgh and Glasgow. In 1999 routes from Newcastle to Belfast and Copenhagen, and from Aberdeen to Oslo were introduced.

On 31 March 2002 the airline was merged into British Airways Citiexpress. The new regional air carrier pioneered and attained CAA Approval for the self-service boarding pass enabling passengers to print their own boarding passes at home.

== Fleet ==
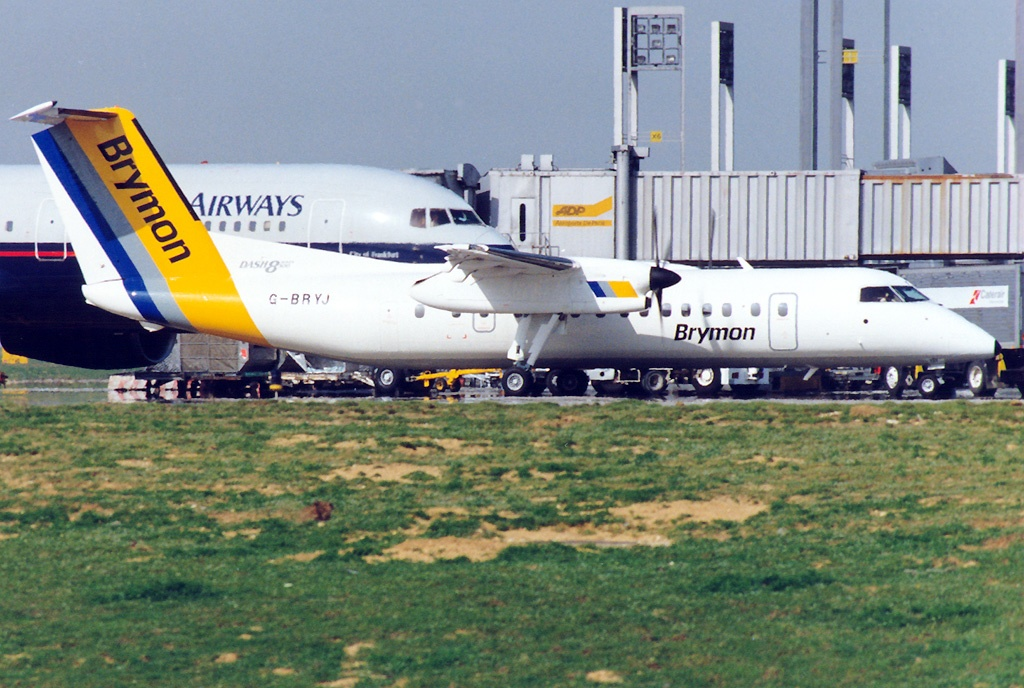
Bombardier Dash 8 at Paris-Charles de Gaulle Airport in 1992

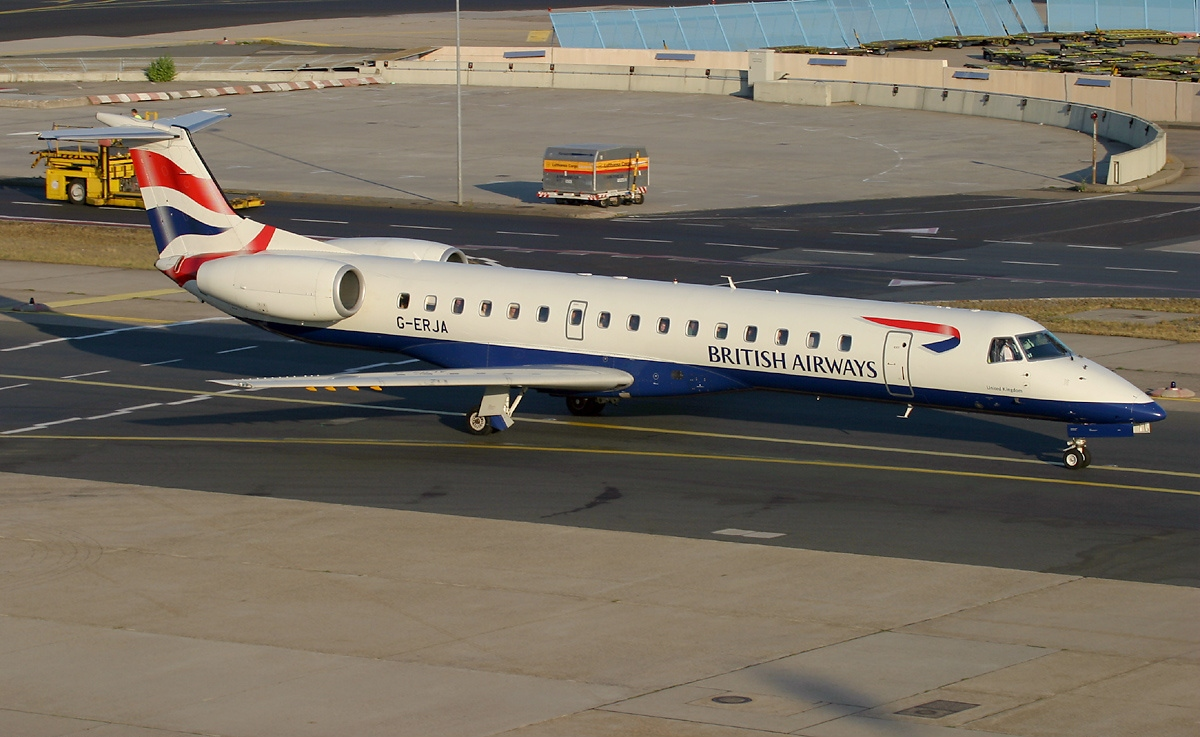
Embraer ERJ 145

Brymon Airways fleet consisted of the following aircraft throughout operations:

Aircraft	Total	Notes
BAC 1-11	5	operated under Brymon European Airways brand
DHC-6 Twin Otter	7	
DHC-7 Dash 7	12	
Bombardier Dash 8-300	14	Operated on behalf of British Airways
Embraer ERJ 145	10	Operated on behalf of British Airways
Handley Page Herald	1	
BN Islander	4	G-AXXJ ('72-'77), G-AZEI ('74), G-BAVT ('75), G-BADK ('72-'80)

== See also ==
- List of defunct airlines of the United Kingdom
