= Birmingham European Airways =

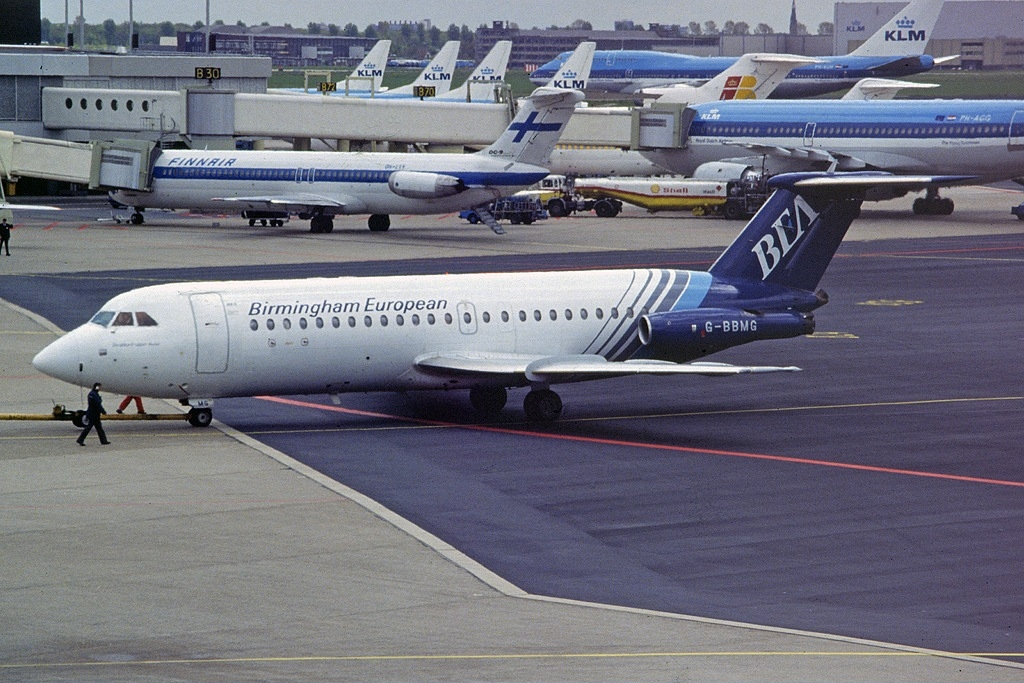
- BAC 1-11
IATA	ICAO	Call sign
VB	BEA	BIRMEX
- Founded: 1983
- Commenced operations: 1992
- Ceased operations: 1993 (merged assets and became Maersk Air UK)
- Operating bases: Birmingham Airport
- Headquarters: Birmingham, England

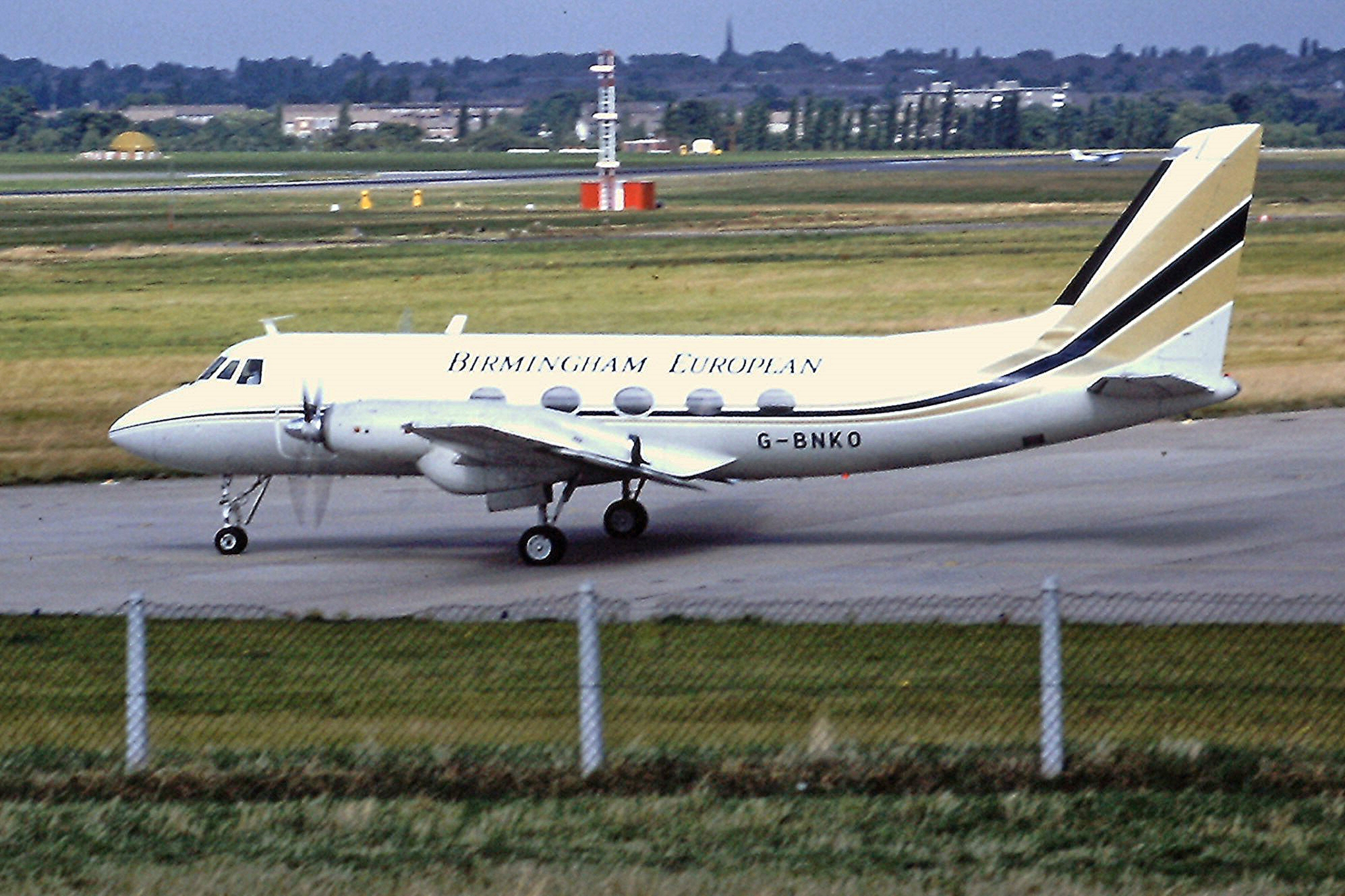
Grumman Gulfstream I

The airline was originally established in 1983 as Birmingham Executive Airways. As its name implied it was based at Birmingham Airport (BHX/EGBB) and operated services geared towards business travellers. The airline began operations on 6 June 1983 with three Jetstream 31 aircraft, flying services from Birmingham to Copenhagen, Zurich and Milan. A Saab 340 was introduced in February 1985, but it suffered severe reliability problems in service, and was retired at the end of the year. To replace it, the air carrier chose the Gulfstream I, operating a wet-leased aircraft from September 1986, with the airline receiving the first of its own Gulfstreams, fitted out as 24-seat airliners in February 1987. At that time the airline's route network included points such as Amsterdam, Milan, Oslo, Stuttgart, Newcastle, Belfast and Cork.

In 1988 the airline started also flying some routes on British Airways behalf. In December of that same year the company was taken over by The Plimsoll Line (TPL), which already owned Brymon Airways and Plymouth airport. In turn TPL was owned by British Airways and the Danish airline Maersk Air, each holding a 40% stake. So some Fokker F27s and BAC 1-11s were leased from both companies. In mid-1989 the jetliners and two Shorts 360 made the fleet. In the meantime the airline's corporate name had been changed to the more appropriate Birmingham European Airways. In October 1992, the operations were integrated with those of Brymon Airways under the brand Brymon European Airways.

In 1993, with the demerger of the loss-making TPL the Danish Maersk Air became the sole owner and renamed it Maersk Air UK in the month of July.

In January 2006 there was news of a new Birmingham European Airways being established, once again using Jetstream aircraft to serve European destinations from Birmingham and with the stated aim of starting operations during 2006.

== Birmingham Executive Airways fleet ==
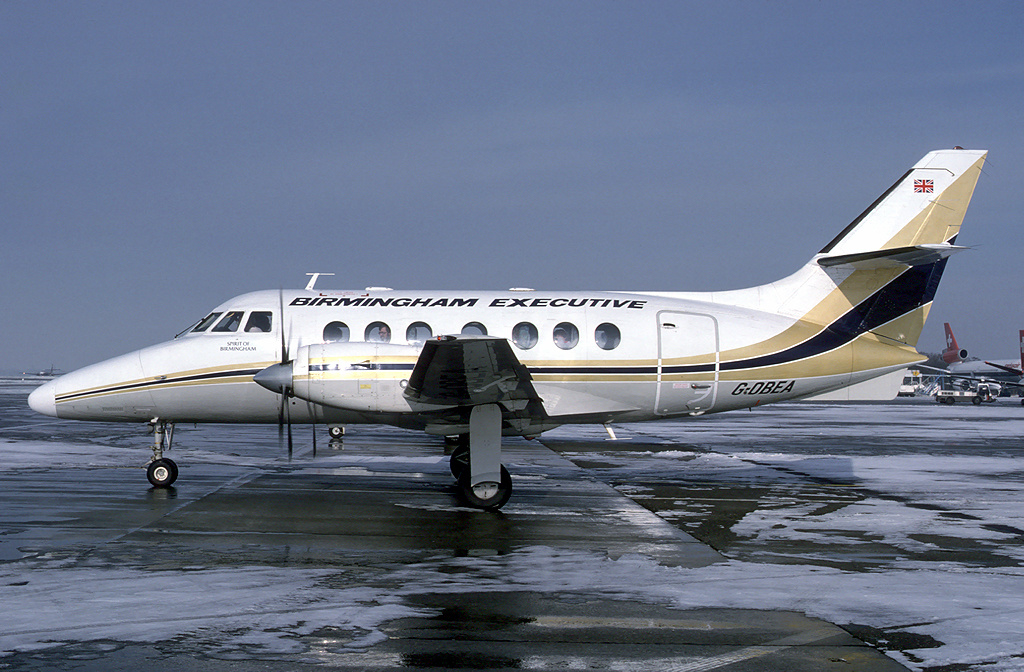
British Aerospace Jetstream 31

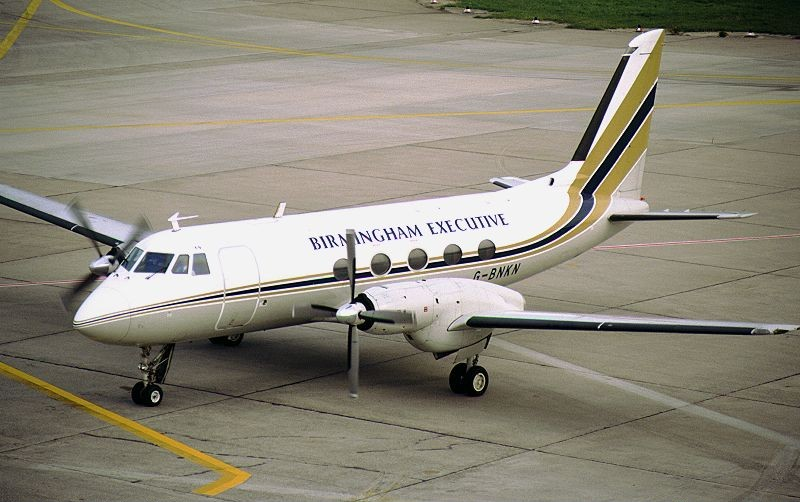
Grumman Gulfstream I

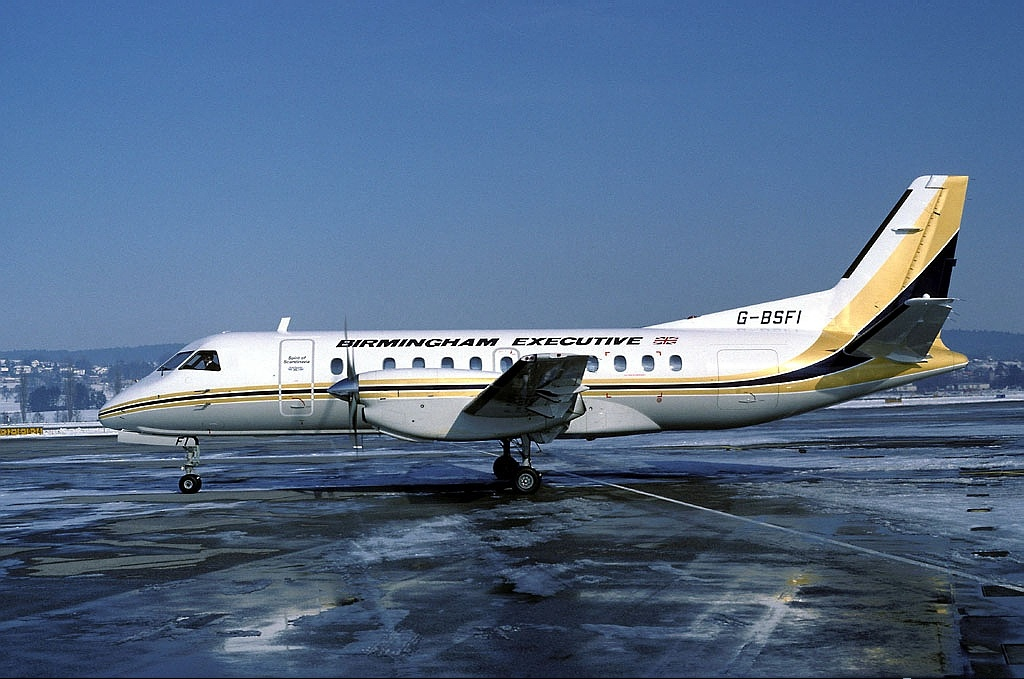
Saab 340

== See also ==
- List of defunct airlines of the United Kingdom
