= Hemberg =

Hemberg may refer to:

== Places ==
- Hemberg, St. Gallen, a town in St. Gallen, Switzerland
- Hemberg (ridge), a hill ridge in Hesse, Germany

== People with the surname ==
- Jöns Peter Hemberg, (1763-1864) Swedish banker and member of parliament
- Eugen Hemberg, (1845-1946) Swedish author and forester
- Eskil Hemberg, (1938-2004) Swedish composer and opera director
- Oscar Hemberg, (1881-1944) Swedish screenwriter, and newspaper editor
- Pawin von Hemberg (ca. 1350) knight in the Holy Roman Empire and Erbkämmerer to the archbishop of Cologne
- Christian Hemberg, (1981) Swedish former professional footballer
- Elli Hemberg (1896- 1994) Swedish painter and sculptor
