= Linjeflyg =

Domestic airline of Sweden (1957–1993)

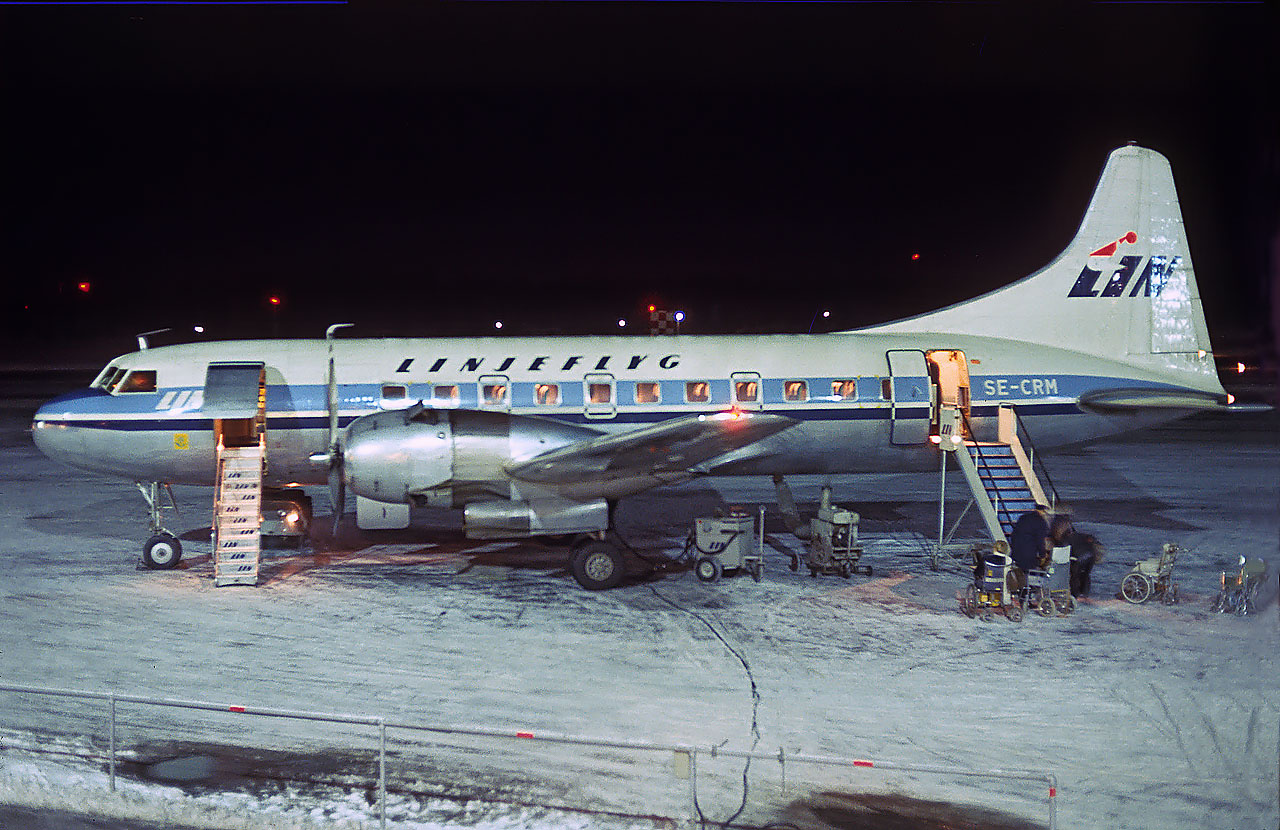
| IATA | ICAO | Call sign |
|---|---|---|
| LF | LIN | SWEDLINE |
- Founded: 1957
- Ceased operations: 1993 (merged into Scandinavian Airlines)
- Hubs: Stockholm–Bromma (1957–1983); Stockholm–Arlanda (1983–1993)
- Fleet size: 35 (1992)
- Destinations: 39 (1992)
- Parent company: SAS Group
- Headquarters: Stockholm, Sweden
- Key people: Sven Östling (1957–1967); Arne Wickberg (1967–1973); Sten Sandberg (1973–1978); Jan Carlzon (1978–1980); Olle Hedberg (1980–1983); Christer Magnusson (1984–1987); Christer Nilsson (1987–1992); Jan Sundling (1992–1993)

Linjeflyg was a Swedish domestic airline, formed in 1957 as a domestic subsidiary by Scandinavian Airlines System and Airtaco as well as by newspaper publishers Dagens Nyheter AB and Stockholms-Tidningen AB.

== History ==
Airtaco (founded in August 1950 as Aero Scandia) can be considered Linjeflyg's predecessor and was merged into the new airline, including its entire fleet. When Linjeflyg was founded, Airtaco's four Lockheed Model 18 Lodestars and four Douglas DC-3s were integrated into the new fleet.

In October 1983 Linjeflyg moved from Stockholm Bromma Airport in the central part of Stockholm to Stockholm Arlanda Airport in the north of Stockholm. Bromma had been the main hub for Linjeflyg since 1957. On 10 September 1990 Scandinavian Airlines System (SAS) sold their 50% in Linjeflyg to Bilspedition for 475 million Swedish crowns (SEK). Approximately six months later SAS bought it back.

In February 1992 Linjeflyg became too big a threat for SAS, because it planned a strategic alliance with Braathens and Maersk Air. Such an alliance would have been too competitive for SAS on the intra-Scandinavian capital routes and on domestic flights. Consequently SAS bought the 50% of Linjeflyg that it did not already own, to maintain its market dominance. On 1 January 1993 Linjeflyg was merged into SAS. Linjeflyg was Sweden's largest domestic airline. It served over 20 domestic airports and carried over 5 million people annually. Linjeflyg had 2200 employees in 1992, and was at that time the largest Fokker F28 operator in the world.

== Fleet ==
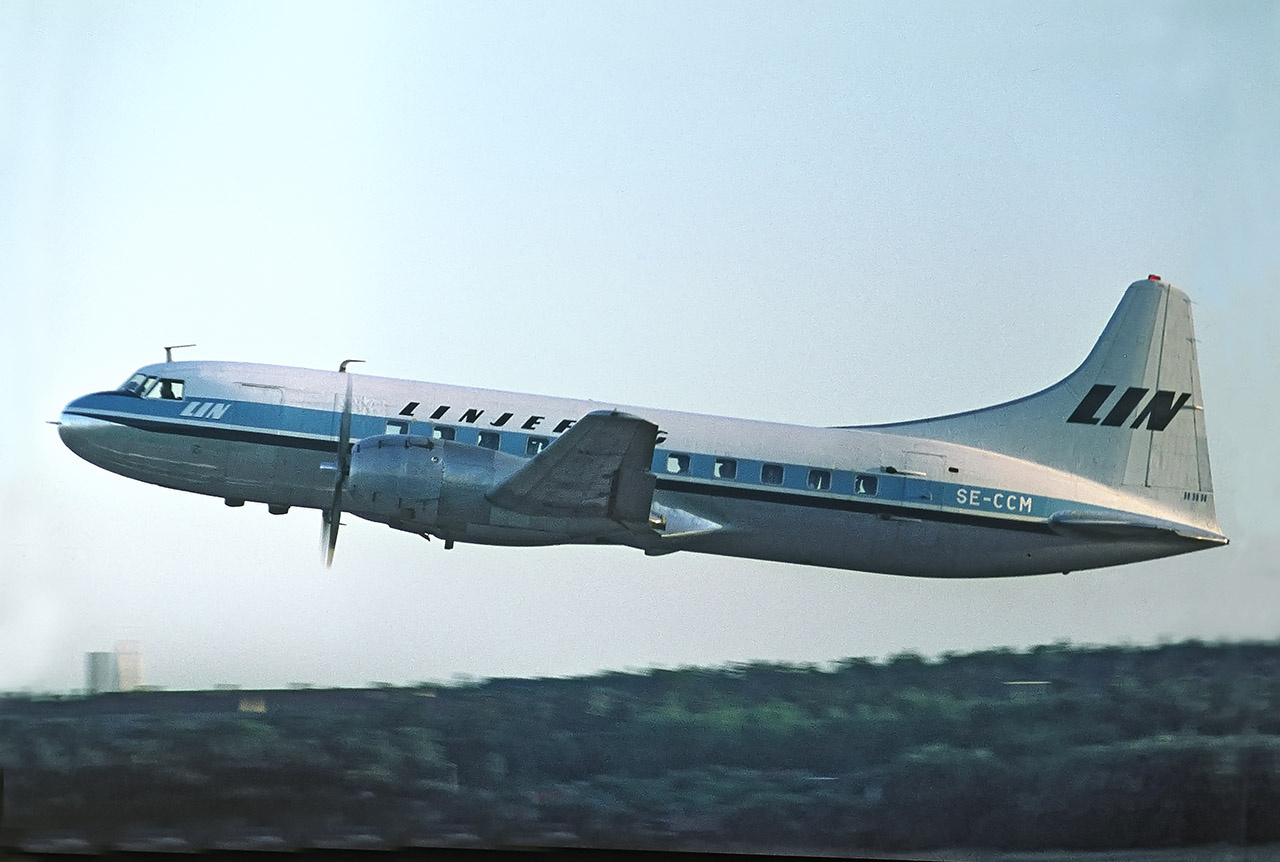
A Linjeflyg Convair 440 at Stockholm-Bromma Airport

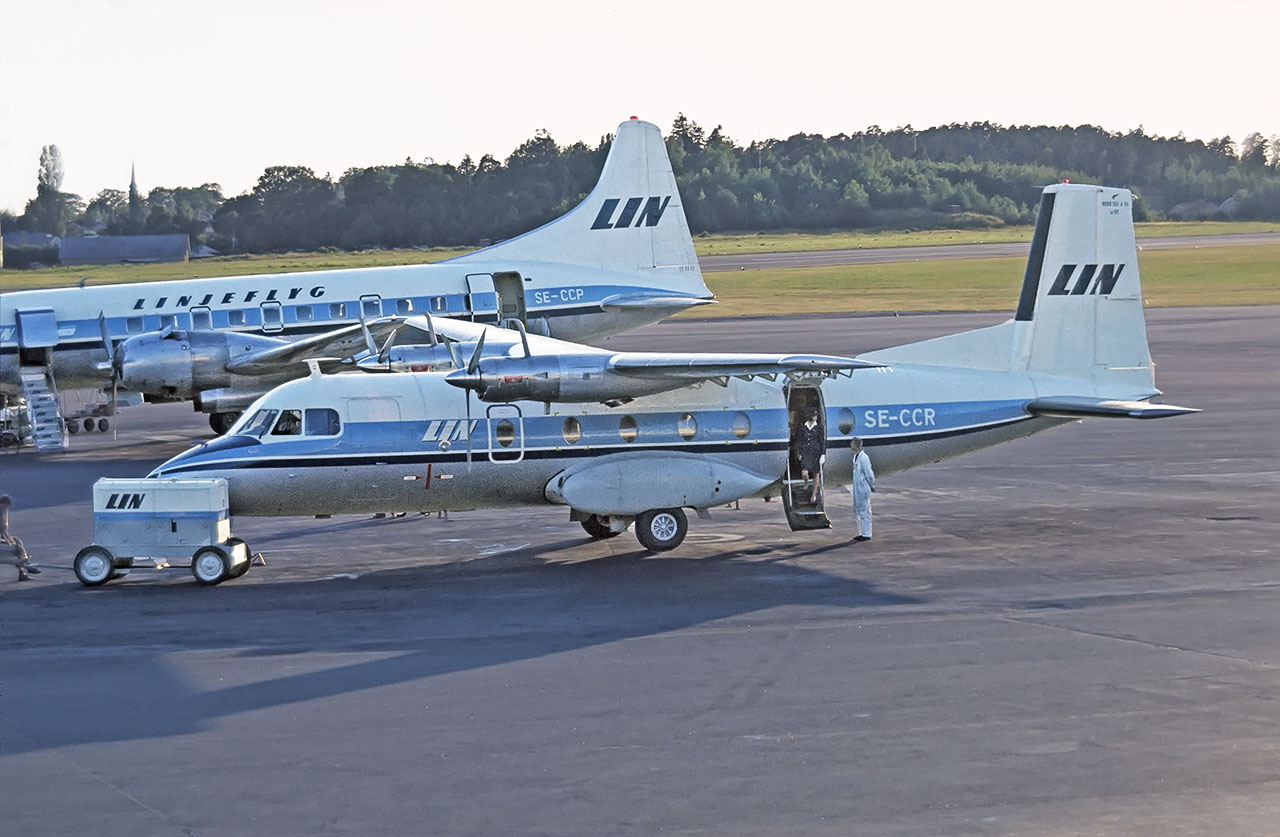
A Linjeflyg Nord 262 at Stockholm-Bromma Airport

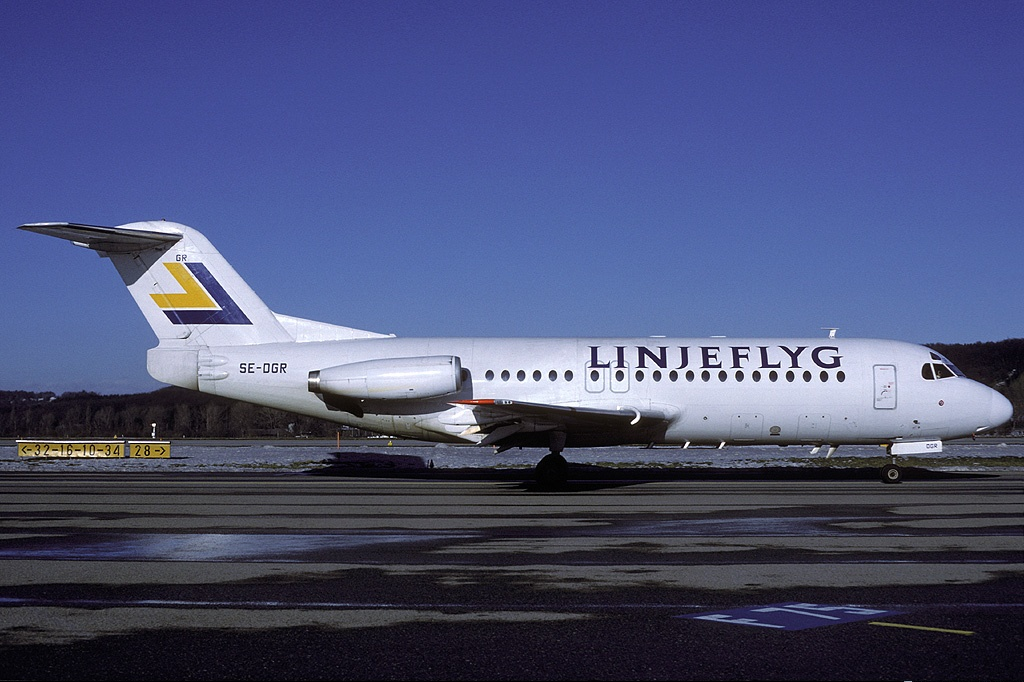
A Linjeflyg Fokker F28 at Zürich Airport

| Aircraft | Active between (year) | Number of planes | Seating capacity | Remarks |
|---|---|---|---|---|
| Lockheed L-12 Electra Junior | 1957 | 1 | 9 | Former Airtaco AB plane, was not painted in Linjeflyg colors. |
| Lockheed L-18 Lodestar | 1957-60 | 4 | 15 | |
| Douglas DC-3 | 1957-65 | 16 | 28-32 | |
| Convair 340 and 440 Metropolitan | 1960-79 | 23 | 52-56 | |
| Aero 680 Grand Commander | 1965-67 | 2 | 7-8 | Operated by Ehrenström Flyg AB. Linjeflyg titles on the fuselage. |
| Nord 262 | 1967-75 | 4 | 26 | |
| Fokker F-28 Fellowship | 1973-92 | 20 | 65-70, 85 | Operated both Fokker F28 Mk.1000 (3) and Fokker F28 Mk.4000 (17). Excludes one short-term leased F28 Mk.1000 from Martinair as well as two F28 Mk.6000 leased from Fokker. Was the launch customer of the Mk.4000 which was a customized version for Linjeflyg. |
| Boeing 737-500 | 1990-92 | 10 | 130-131 | First delivery in April 1990. |
| Boeing 737-300 | 1989-91 | 2 | 147-148 | Oneplane leased from Maersk Air and one from ILFC. |
| Boeing 737-33AQC | 1991-92 | 3 | 142 | Operated by Falcon Air in Linjeflyg livery. |

== Incidents and accidents ==
- On 20 November 1964 Flight 267V, operated by Convair 440 SE-CCK, crashed during an approach to Ängelholm joint civil/military Airport. In instrument conditions, the crew abandoned the set procedure and began the final approach too early. The reason for this must have been that the crew allowed themselves to be misled by an arrangement of lights peculiar to the airfield with which, apart from certain information received during the approach, they were not acquainted. Thirty-one of the 43 people aboard were killed in Sweden's worst air disaster.
- On 15 January 1977 Flight 618, operated by Vickers Viscount SE-FOZ leased from Skyline, crashed at Kälvesta on approach to Bromma Airport, Stockholm owing to ice accretion on the tailplane leading to a loss of control. All 22 people on board were killed.

== See also ==
- SAS Group
- Scandinavian Airlines
- List of defunct airlines of Europe
