= Linjeflyg Flight 618 =

1977 aviation accident

- A view of the wreckage, in which the inverted tailplane is clearly visible as the only recognisable part

Accident
- Date: 15 January 1977
- Summary: Atmospheric icing
- Site: Kälvesta, Stockholm, Sweden; 59°22′54″N 17°51′56″E

Aircraft
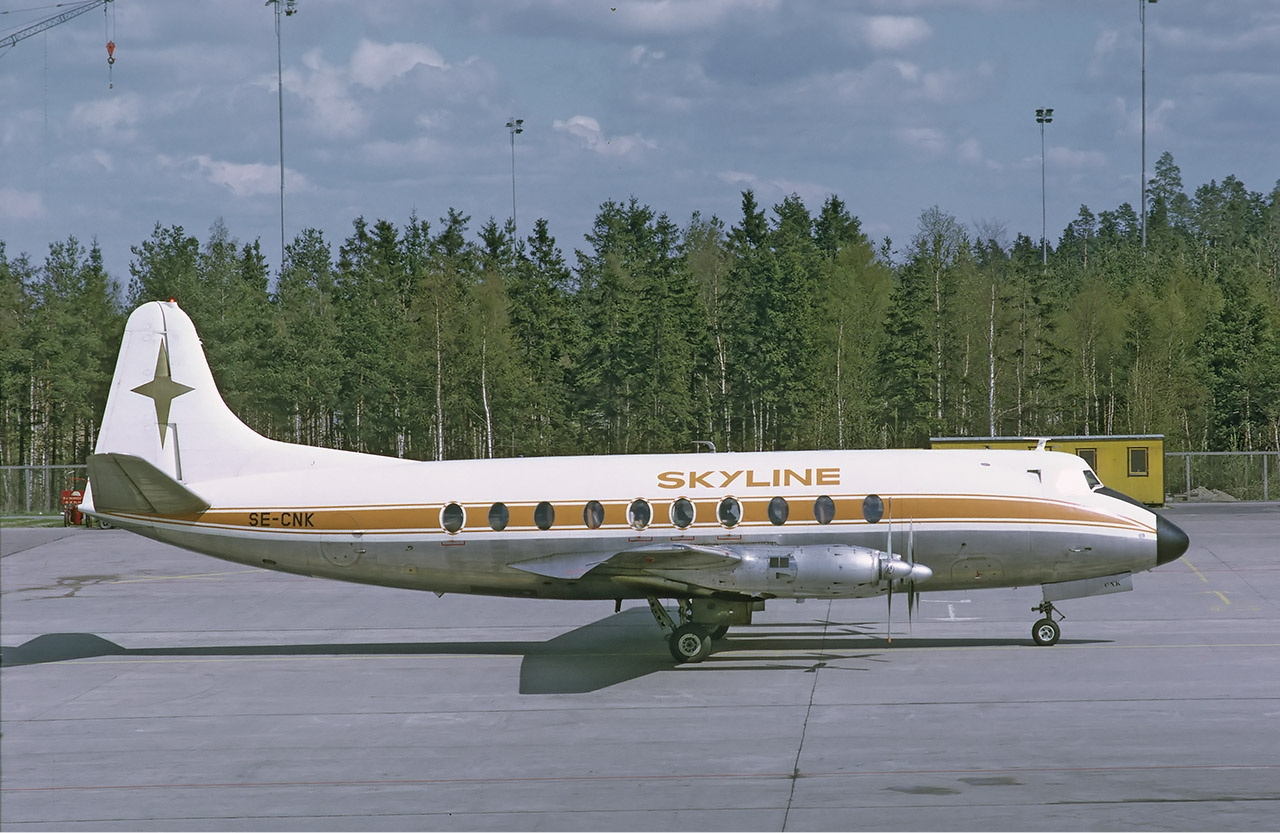
- A similar Vickers Viscount to the accident aircraft, depicted in 1972
- Aircraft type: Vickers 838 Viscount
- Operator: Skyline for Linjeflyg
- Registration: SE-FOZ
- Flight origin: Malmö Sturup Airport
- 1st stopover: Kristianstad Airport
- 2nd stopover: Växjö Småland Airport
- 3rd stopover: Jönköping Airport
- Destination: Stockholm Bromma Airport
- Occupants: 22
- Passengers: 19
- Crew: 3
- Fatalities: 22
- Survivors: 0

Linjeflyg Flight 618 was a crash of a Vickers 838 Viscount during approach to Stockholm Bromma Airport at 09:05 on 15 January 1977. All twenty-two people on board the aircraft perished when it hit ground at Kälvesta in Stockholm, Sweden. The domestic service from Malmö via Kristianstad, Växjö and Jönköping was operated by Skyline on behalf of Linjeflyg as part of the latter's domestic scheduled services. The accident was caused by atmospheric icing on the horizontal stabilizer. Low power on two of the engines had caused reduced function of the ice protection system, causing a buildup of ice. The icing caused the loss of pitch control and the aircraft entered a steep dive. Among the deceased was table tennis player Hans Alsér.

== Flight ==
Because of delays of the delivery of their new Fokker F28 Fellowship aircraft, Linjeflyg started in 1975 to wet lease flights from Skyline. The airline operated three Vickers Viscount aircraft in this period, using their own crew and aircraft, but with Linjeflyg's flight codes and chartered for an hourly fee. During the late 1970s Linjeflyg accounted for the vast majority of Skyline's revenue.

Flight 618 was a domestic scheduled passenger flight on 15 January 1977. It was conducted using a Vickers 838 Viscount with registration SE-FOZ. The aircraft was bought used by Skyline in 1976 to replace an existing, smaller Viscount 784. With a first flight in 1961, it had flown 12,208 hours at the time of the accident. Flight 618 was to fly from Malmö Sturup Airport to Stockholm Bromma Airport, with intermediate stops at Kristianstad Airport, Växjö Småland Airport and Jönköping Airport. The flight commenced as nominal until descent to Bromma. At this time there were nineteen passengers and a crew of three on board, including the well-known table tennis player Hans Alsér.

== Accident ==
During flight the number two and three engines were run at reduced power for a prolonged period, causing the ice protection system temperature to sink below minimum thresholds. The horizontal stabilizer was therefore subject to atmospheric icing. The pilots noticed this at an altitude of 350 meters (1,150 ft) when they experienced loss of pitch control. The aircraft entered a steep dive and crashed at a parking lot in Kälvesta, a neighborhood of Stockholm. The impact took place at 09:05 local time, 4.5 kilometers (2.8 mi) from the threshold of the runway at Bromma. All on board were killed in the crash.

== Investigation ==
A full investigation into the cause of the accident was ordered by the Government of Sweden. The investigation came to the following conclusions:

The aircraft had been cruising for a long period with the number two and number three engines at a low power setting. This meant that the anti-icing systems run from the engines were not at a temperature sufficient for them to operate correctly. As a result, ice built up on the tailplane, which disrupted the airflow, causing the loss of pitch control when the flaps were being fully extended on final approach.

== Aftermath ==
One issue after the accident was the relationship between Linjeflyg and Skyline. The small size of the latter was a concern, without the apparatus to handle a major accident. Linjeflyg took most of the immediate handling of the issue as it was their flight.

Skyline leased a Viscount 814D, with registration G-AZNH, as replacement for the wrecked aircraft. This arrangement lasted for some months, before Skyline's contract with Linjeflyg was terminated due to the delivery of the F28s. Shortly afterwards Skyline filed for bankruptcy.

== Victims ==
Victims of Linjeflyg Flight 618 included: Captain Sten Holmstedt, 45, Genarp; Stewardess Pia Marlow, 28, Malmö; First officer Björn Björnsson, 33, Nacka; Hans Alsér, 34, Borås; Rolf H. Stjernswärd, Vittskövle Castle; Mrs Inger Stjernswärd, Vittskövle Castle; Dentist Jan-Erik Milton, Jönköping; Glazier Yngve Rosén, Jönköping; Sales manager Sven Gunnar Lundvall, Sundsvall; Mats Adolfsson, Gothenburg; Sven Östen Albertsson (born 1913), Växjö; Inge Vilgot Andersson (born 1926), Farsta; Monica Hansson (born 1941), Åhus; Stig Olof Jonsson (born 1951), Sundsvall; Sven Olof Myresten (born 1933), Bankeryd; Arne Palm (born 1918), Stockholm; Berndt Yngve Göran Persson (born 1928), Farsta; Anna Niemi (born 1901), Järvenpää, Finland; Tage Bertil Nordqvist (born 1936), Huskvarna; Gunnar Sahlberg (born 1935), Kalvsvik; Arne Magnus Somero (born 1958), Smålandsstenar; Rolf Henning (born 1916), Vittskövle, Degeberga; Per Kasper Tham, Saltsjöbaden.
