= Skyline (Sweden) =

Swedish charter airline (1971–1978)

IATA	ICAO	Call sign
OX	—	—
- Commenced operations: 1971
- Ceased operations: 1978
- Operating bases: Malmö Bulltofta Airport (1971–72); Malmö Sturup Airport (1972–78); Stockholm Bromma Airport (1975–77)
- Fleet size: 3 (1975–77)
- Destinations: 7 (1976–77)
- Headquarters: Malmö, Sweden

Skyline (IATA: OX) was a Swedish charter airline which operated from 1971 to 1978. It had a fleet of Vickers Viscount aircraft, operating between one and three at any given time and a total of five aircraft. Based in Malmö, it initially flew out of Malmö Bulltofta Airport. The airport closed in 1972 and Skyline moved to Malmö Sturup Airport.

From 1975 to 1977 the company experienced a major increase to traffic flying three aircraft for Linjeflyg for its scheduled, domestic network. Flying out of Stockholm Bromma Airport, it served seven towns in southern Sweden. On 15 January 1977 one its aircraft flying Linjeflyg Flight 618 crashed at Kälvesta during approach to Bromma, killing all 22 people on board. The Linjeflyg contract expired that year and the company ceased operations in 1978.

== History ==
Skyline was established in 1971 with a base at Malmö Bulltofta Airport. It originally operated a Vickers 784 Viscount with a capacity for 65 passengers. It relied on various charter services, such as student clubs and sports clubs for revenue. Skyline moved from Bulltofta to the Malmö Sturup Airport on 2 December 1972, when the former was closed and replaced by the latter.

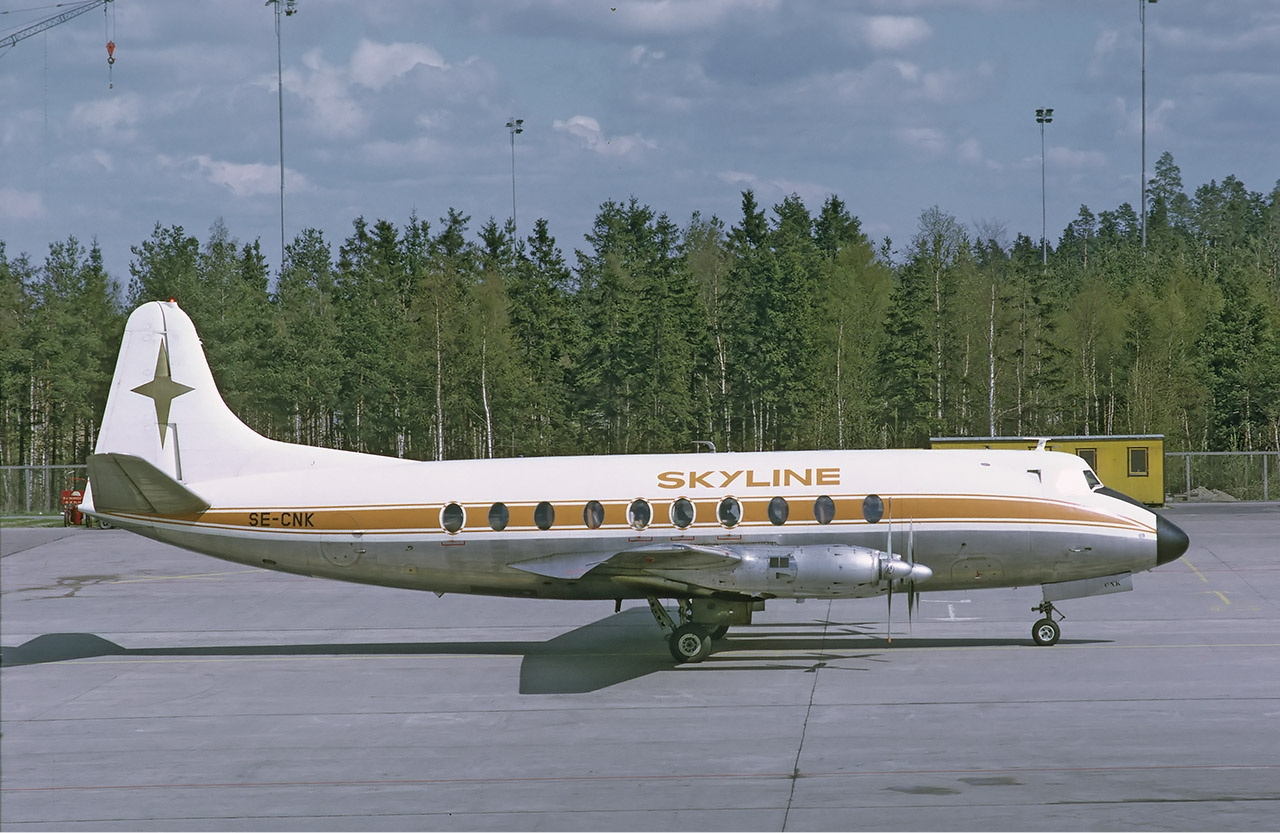
A Vickers Viscount in 1972

Because of delays of the delivery of their new Fokker F28 Fellowship aircraft, Linjefly started in 1975 to wet lease flights from Skyline. Initially these consisted of the routes Stockholm–Kalmar–Ronneby, Stockholm–Visby, Stockholm–Visby–Kalmar–Ronneby–Malmö, Stockholm–Hultsfred–Växjö–Kristianstad–Malmö.To deal with the traffic, Skyline leased two additional Viscounts, the larger 814D model with capacity for 75 passengers. These had originally been delivered to Lufthansa. Skyline operated with their own crew and aircraft, but with Linjeflyg's flight codes and chartered for an hourly fee. During the late 1970s Linjeflyg accounted for the vast majority of Skyline's revenue, although it continued to supplement with conventional charter flights.

The airline replaced its first aircraft with a similar, larger Vickers 838 Viscount. That year Skyline started two additional routes for Linjeflyg: Stockholm–Jönköping and Stockholm–Karlstad. However, the aircraft would be written off in Flight 618 on 15 January 1977 and was therefore replaced with a leased Viscont 814D. This arrangement lasted for some months, before Skyline's contract with Linjeflyg was terminated due to the delivery of the F28s. Skyline ceased operations in 1978.

== Destinations ==
The following is a list of the airports which Skyline served in scheduled services.

List of destinations
City	Airport	Period
Hultsfred	Hultsfred Airport	1975–77
Kalmar	Kalmar Airport	1975–77
Karlstad	Karlstad Airport	1976–77
Jönköping	Jönköping Airport	1976–77
Malmö	Malmö Sturup Airport	1975–77
Ronneby	Ronneby Airport	1975–77
Stockholm	Stockholm Bromma Airport	1975–77
Visby	Visby Airport	1975–77

== Accidents and incidents ==
Skyline's only accident was Linjeflyg Flight 618, which took place during approach to Stockholm Bromma Airport at 09:05 on 15 January 1977. The flight was operated from Malmö to Stockholm via Kristianstand, Växjö and Jönköping. During approach to Stockholm Bromma Airport the horizontal stabilizer experienced atmospheric icing. Low power on two of the engines had caused reduced function of the ice protection system, causing a buildup of ice. During approach the pilots suddenly lost pitch control and the aircraft crashed in the neighborhood of Kälvesta, Stockholm. There were nineteen passengers and a crew of three on board; all were killed in the accident.
