= Gustaf Hagerman =

Swedish merchant and banker

Gustaf David Hagerman (1770-1839), was a Swedish merchant and banker.

== Career ==
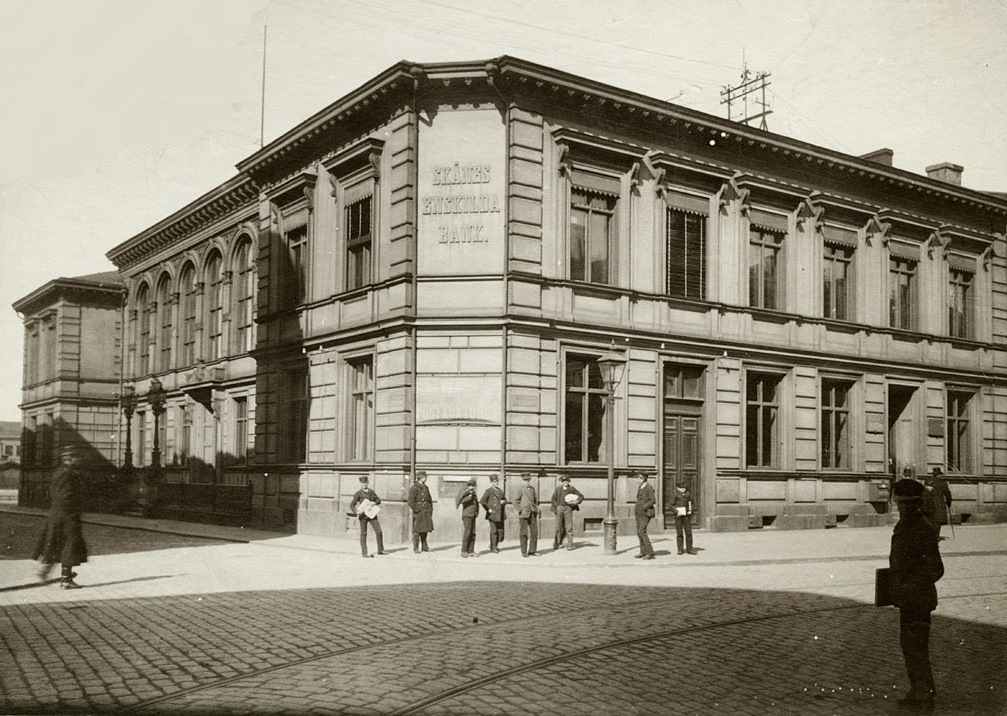
Skånes Enskilda Bank in the 1890s.

Gustaf Hagerman was born on the 22 September 1770 in Tolånga parish, and died the 23 August 1839 in Ystad, Scania. He was the son of the Vicar Christian Hagerman. Hagerman began venturing into business through a relative of his Predbjörn Blanxius, with whom he trained to become a trader of raw materials. Upon his death, Blanxius left Hagerman his business, which at the time included mostly trading of grain. In 1798 he earned trading rights through his partnership with Jöns Peter Hemberg, and in 1802 he started his own company. Thanks to the continental system, Ystad profited greatly during the early 19th century, and so did Hagerman's business, which grew in range of products traded, including: spices, tobacco, tea, wine, iron, tools, paper, and tapestries. In 1930, Hagerman, together with Jöns Peter Hemberg, and Gustav Berghman, founded Skånes Enskilda Bank, in which he was a board member 1831–1839. The bank grew to become the largest private bank in Sweden during late 1800s.

== Personal life ==
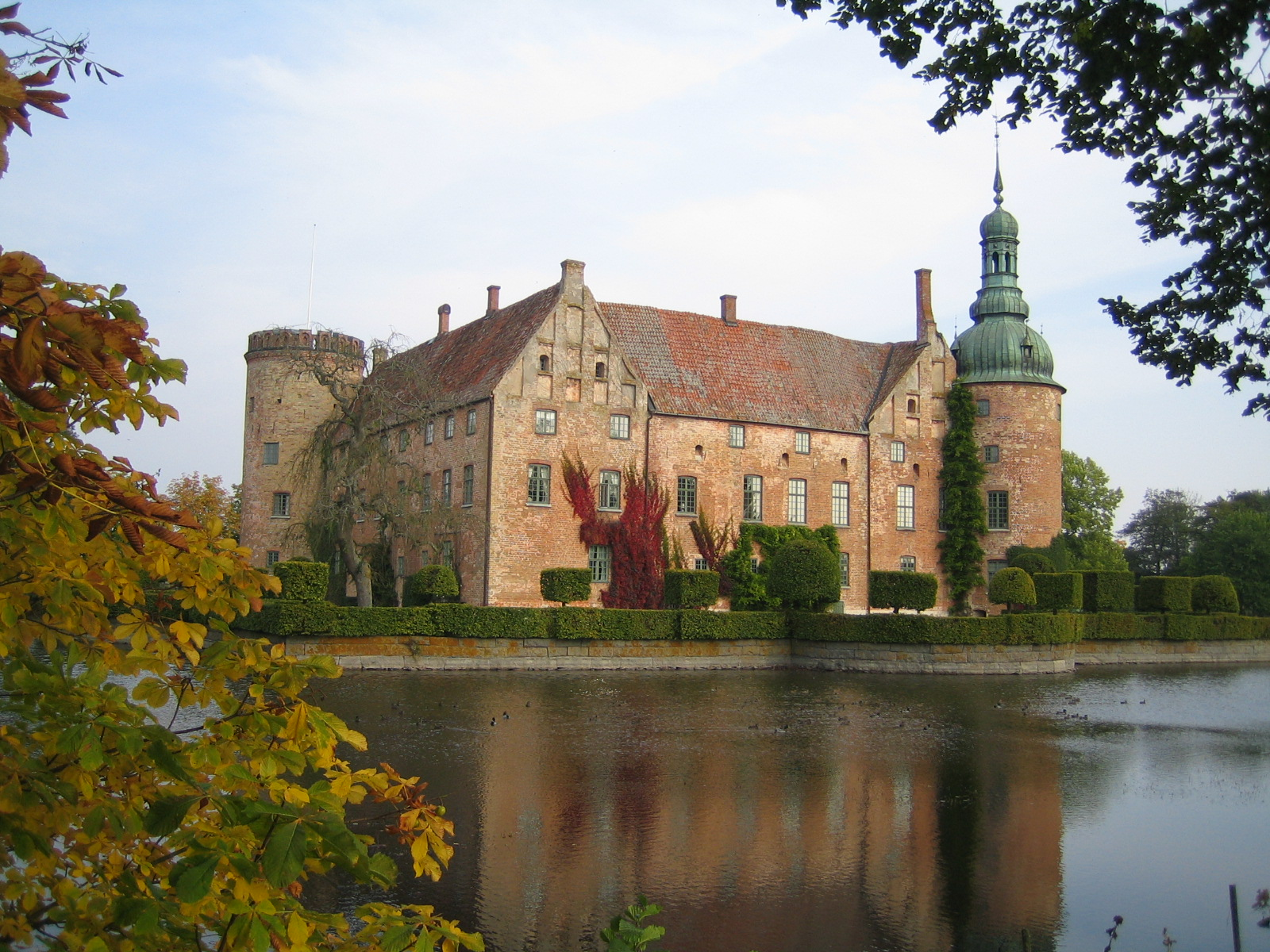
Vittskövle Castle, acquired by Hagerman in 1836.

Gustaf Hagerman on the 7 October 1798, married Christina Maria Blanxius, Predbjörn Blanxius' daughter. In 1831 he built the Hagerman House in Ystad, and in 1836 he acquired Vittskövle Castle from his brother, Jonas Hagerman, where he spent his final years. Vittskövle Castle, was inherited by his daughter Marie, who married court marshal Rudolf Holder Stjernswärd. Descendants of Hagerman through the Stjernswärd family still own Vittskövle Castle.
