= Falcon Air =

Swedish airline, 1986–2006

IATA	ICAO	Call sign
IH	FCN	FALCON
- Founded: 1986
- Ceased operations: 2006
- Hubs: Malmö Airport
- Fleet size: 2 (2006)
- Destinations: 4 (2005)
- Parent company: Fly Scand AB
- Headquarters: Malmö, Sweden
- Key people: George Ozgol (CEO)
- Website: linjeflyg.com

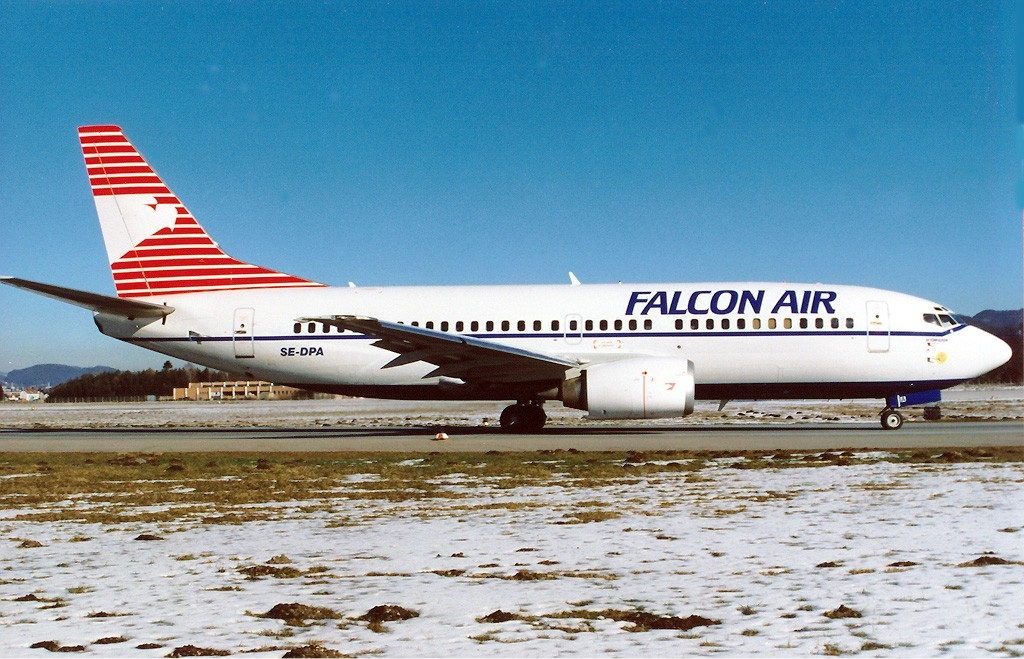
Falcon Air Boeing 737-300

Falcon Air was a cargo and passenger airline based in Malmö, Sweden. It operated mail transport services at night and day flights on contract for FlyMe. Its main base was Malmö/Sturup Airport.

It should not be confused with Falconair, which between May 1967 and 1 September 1970 operated three Vickers Viscount and three Lockheed L-188 Electra, based at Malmö Bulltofta Airport.

== History ==
The airline started air cargo operations in October 1986. It was acquired by Postbolagen in two phases in 1987 and 1988. The airline ceased operations in 2006.

== Destinations ==
Falcon Air operated mail transport during the night from/to Stockholm, Malmö, Umeå, Luleå and Sundsvall in January 2005.

== Fleet ==
The Falcon Air fleet consisted of the following aircraft (at August 2006):

- 3 - Boeing 737-300QC

== See also ==
- Transport in Sweden
