= Falconair =

Swedish airline between 1967 and 1970

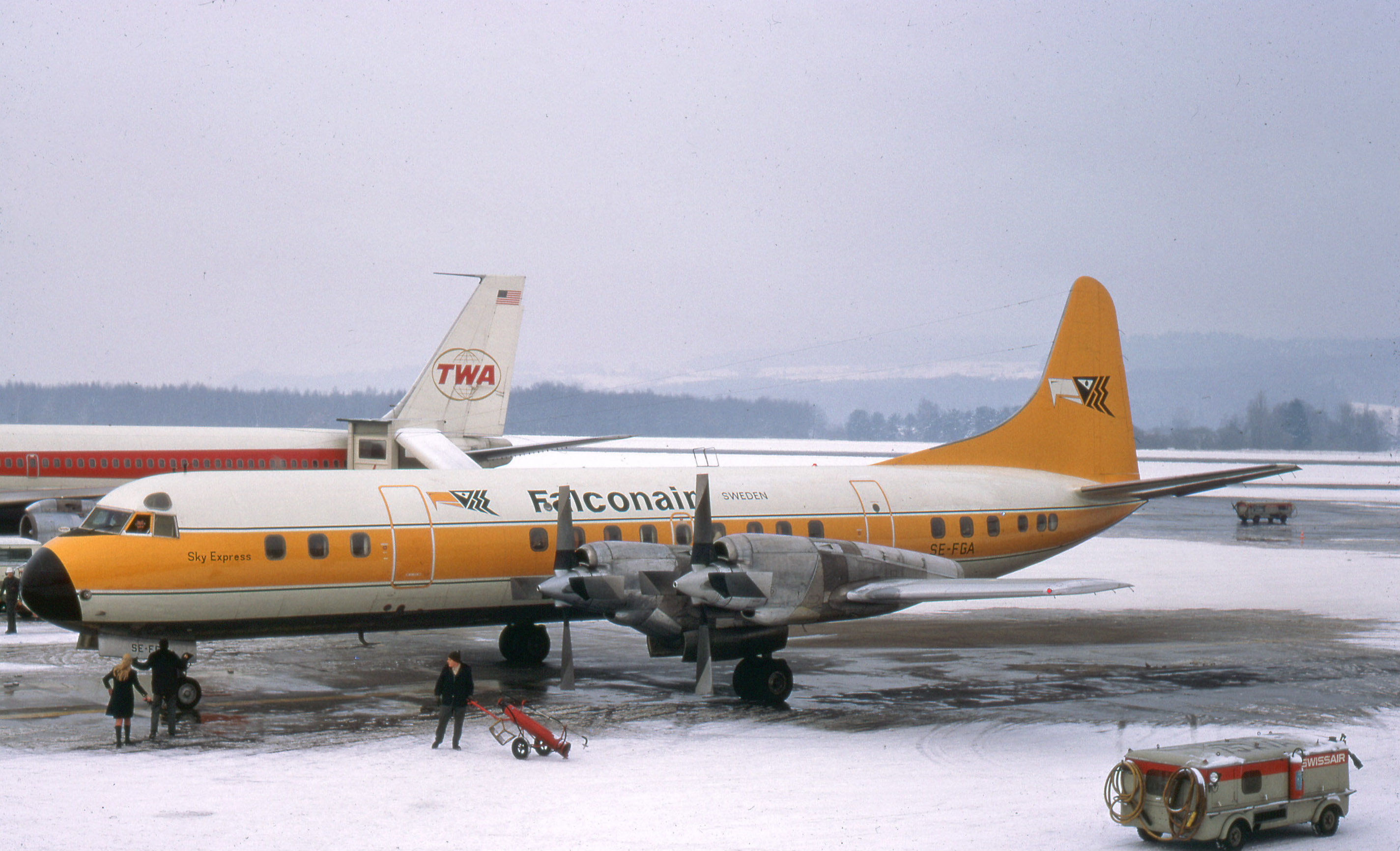
- Founded: 1967
- Ceased operations: 1970
- Hubs: Malmö Bulltofta Airport
- Fleet size: 6

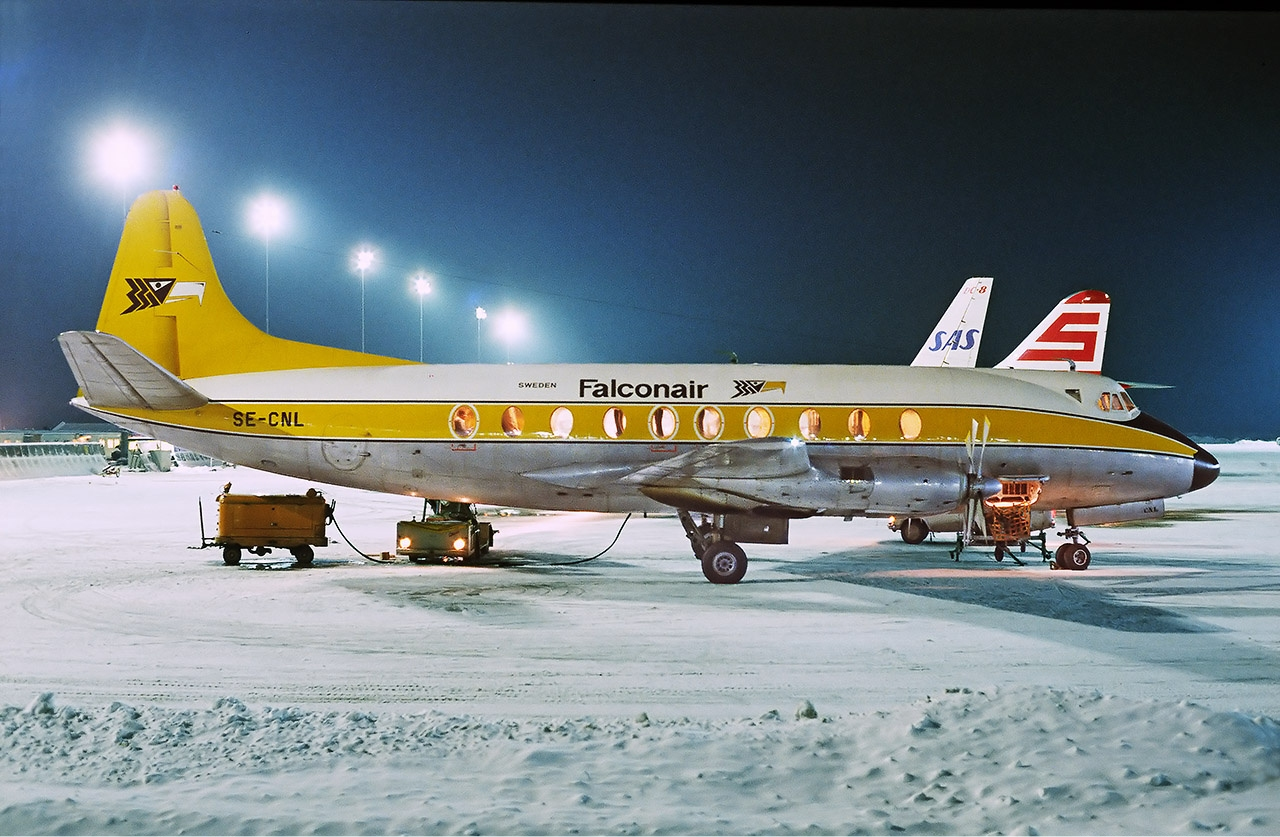
Falconair Vickers Viscount, Stockholm/Arlanda January 1969

Falconair was a Swedish airline existing between 1967 and 1970.

It should not be confused with Falcon Air, which between 1986 and 2006 operated three Boeing 737-300QC, based at Malmö/Sturup Airport.

== History ==
Falconair was based at Malmö Bulltofta Airport in southern Sweden (which was closed in 1972 and replaced by Sturup Airport).

The airline took delivery of two used Vickers Viscount 784D from Philippine Airlines in April 1967 and started operations in May 1967. A third Viscount, a series 784D aircraft, was added to the fleet in May 1967, also from Philippine Airlines.

In January 1969 a Lockheed L-188C Electra was bought from Eastern Airlines, followed by two more, the last one on 16 September 1969.

Falconair ceased operations on 1 September 1970.

Two of the Electras were sold to International Aerodyne, one to Sterling Airways Sweden. In March 1971, the three Viscounts were taken over by Malmö Aero and transferred to Skyline (Sweden).

== Fleet ==
Falconair operated the following aircraft types:

- 3 - Vickers Viscount
- 3 - Lockheed L-188 Electra

== Bibliography ==
- Klee, Ulrich & Bucher, Frank et al. jp airline-fleets international. Zürich-Airport, 1966–2007
