= Smedstorp Castle =

Castle in Scania, Sweden

- Smedstorps slott
- Tomelilla Municipality
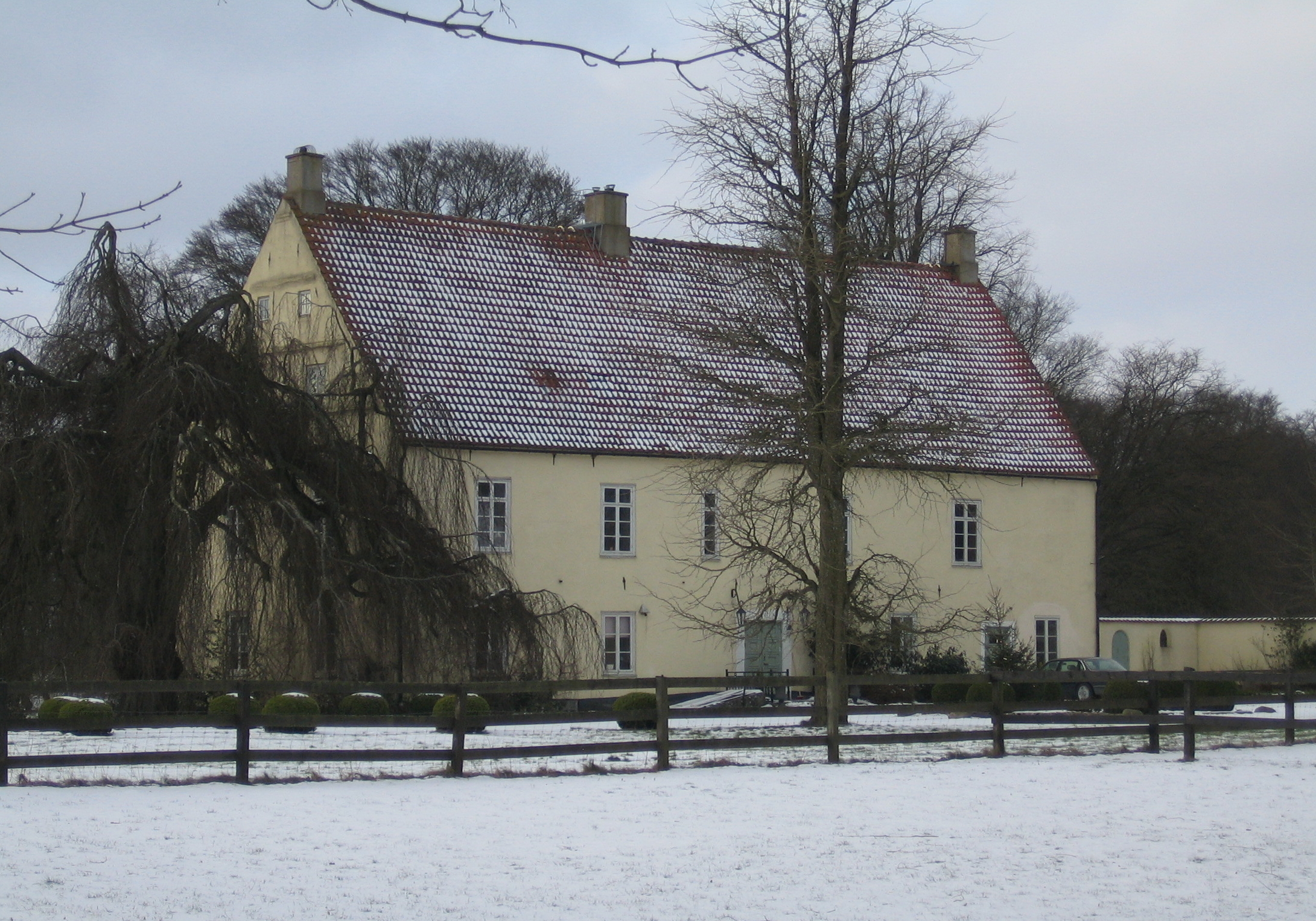
- Smedstorp Castle

Site information
- Type: Castle
- Open to the public: No

Location
- Scania, Sweden
- Location within Skåne
- Coordinates: 55.563053°N 14.107753°E

Site history
- Built: 16th century

Smedstorp Castle (Swedish: Smedstorps slott) is a castle in Tomelilla Municipality, Scania, in southern Sweden.

== History ==
Smedstorp is one of the older estates in Scania. It was for a long time the seat of the noble Swedish family Bing, between the years 1313–1589. Anders Bing, who was a Danish "riksråd" (a member of the privy council) was the last in the family to own the estate. King James I was a guest of Anders Bing at Smedstorp, and dedicated him a poem, which can be read on the tombstone of Anders Bing at Smedstorp's church.

After the Bing family, the estate was owned by the noble Quitzow, Bülow och Kruus families until 1640, when Smedstorp belonged to the Danish Stewart of the Realm Jochum Gersdorff. Upon the treaty in Roskilde 1658, Scania became Swedish, after previously having belonged to Denmark, and as part of the treaty the island of Bornholm was to belong to Sweden. However, war broke out and the population of Bornholm revolted against the Swedish rule. Two years later, another peace treaty was agreed to, the treaty of Copenhagen (1660), and as compensation for the island of Bornholm, the Danish crown turned over 18 estates, owned by Danish noblemen, to the Swedish crown one of which was Smedstorp. The estate was known as "Bornholm vederlagsgods". Until 1713, the estate was used for Swedish officers, when it was given to Peter Monthan, whose son then sold it to the officer Nils Wilhelm Meck in 1781. In the early 19th century Smedstorp was once again sold to the general Carl Gustaf von Platen.

In 1820 the estate was bought by the banker and member of parliament Jöns Peter Hemberg. Smedstorp then stayed in the Hemberg family for three generations, until 1895, when author and forester Eugen Hemberg was the last member of the family to own it.

== See also ==
- List of castles in Sweden
