= Jöns Peter Hemberg =

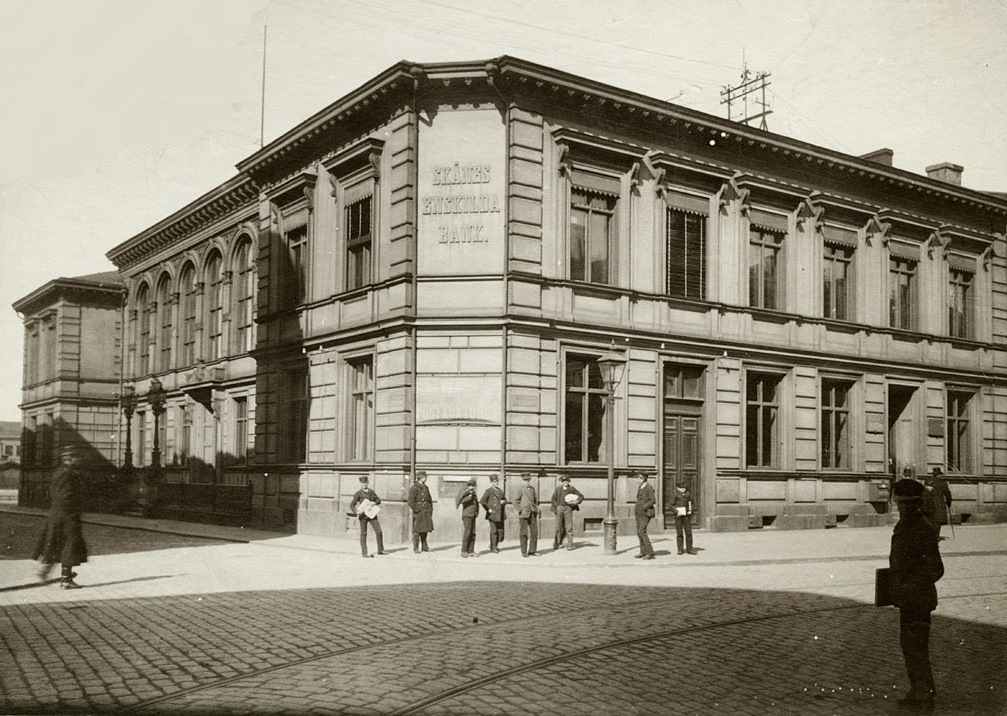
Skånes Enskilda Bank in Malmö in the 1890s

Jöns Peter Hemberg (1763–1834) was a Swedish banker and member of parliament. He founded Skånes Enskilda Bank ("Skåne's Private Bank") in 1830, together with Gustav Berghman, and Gustaf Hagerman, which later merged with Skandinaviska Kreditaktiebolaget.

== Career ==
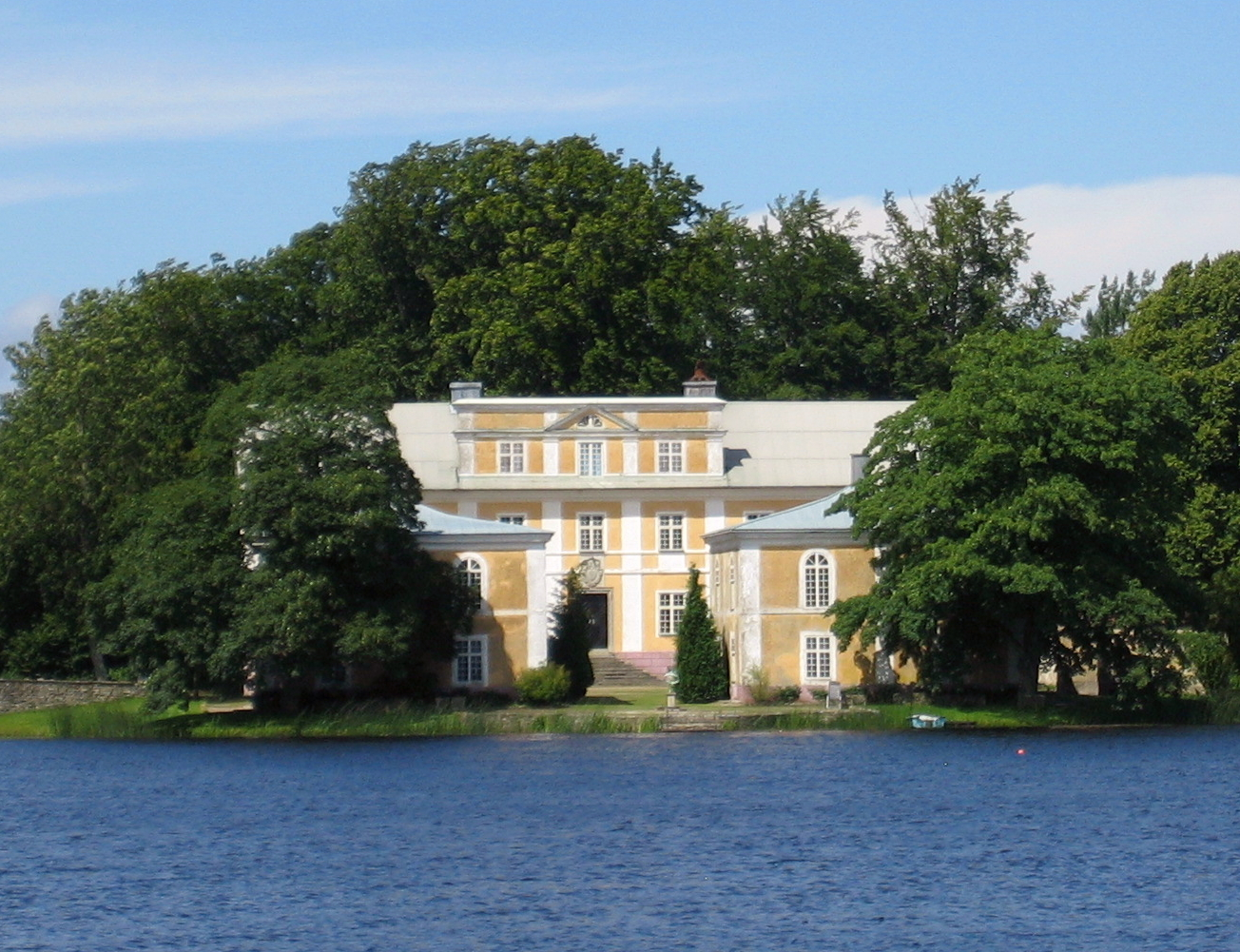
Tunbyholm Castle, owned by Hemberg

Hemberg made his fortune as a commodity merchant. In 1805, he began managing Ystad's auction chamber, through which he acquired some of the largest estates in Scania, including Öja in 1812, Tunbyholm Castle in 1818, and Smedstorp Castle in 1820. He went on to represent Ystad as a member of parliament in 1823, 1828–30, 1834–35, during which he successfully managed to get financing to expand Ystad's harbour, as well as actively blocking Trelleborg's attempts to regain its city and trading privileges, which otherwise would have made Trelleborg a serious competitor as a trading centre in the region.

Hemberg founded Skånes Enskilda Bank together with Gustav Berghman, and Gustav Hagerman. The bank was one of the oldest and largest private banks in Sweden. In 1904 it acquired Göteborgs Köpmansbank, and went on to merge with Göteborgs largest private bank, Skandinaviska Kreditaktiebolaget. Skandinaviska Kreditaktiebolaget, which changed its name to Skandinaviska Banken in 1939, went on to merge with Stockholms Enskilda Bank in 1972 to form Skandinaviska Enskilda Banken, or SEB, today one of the largest Nordic banks.

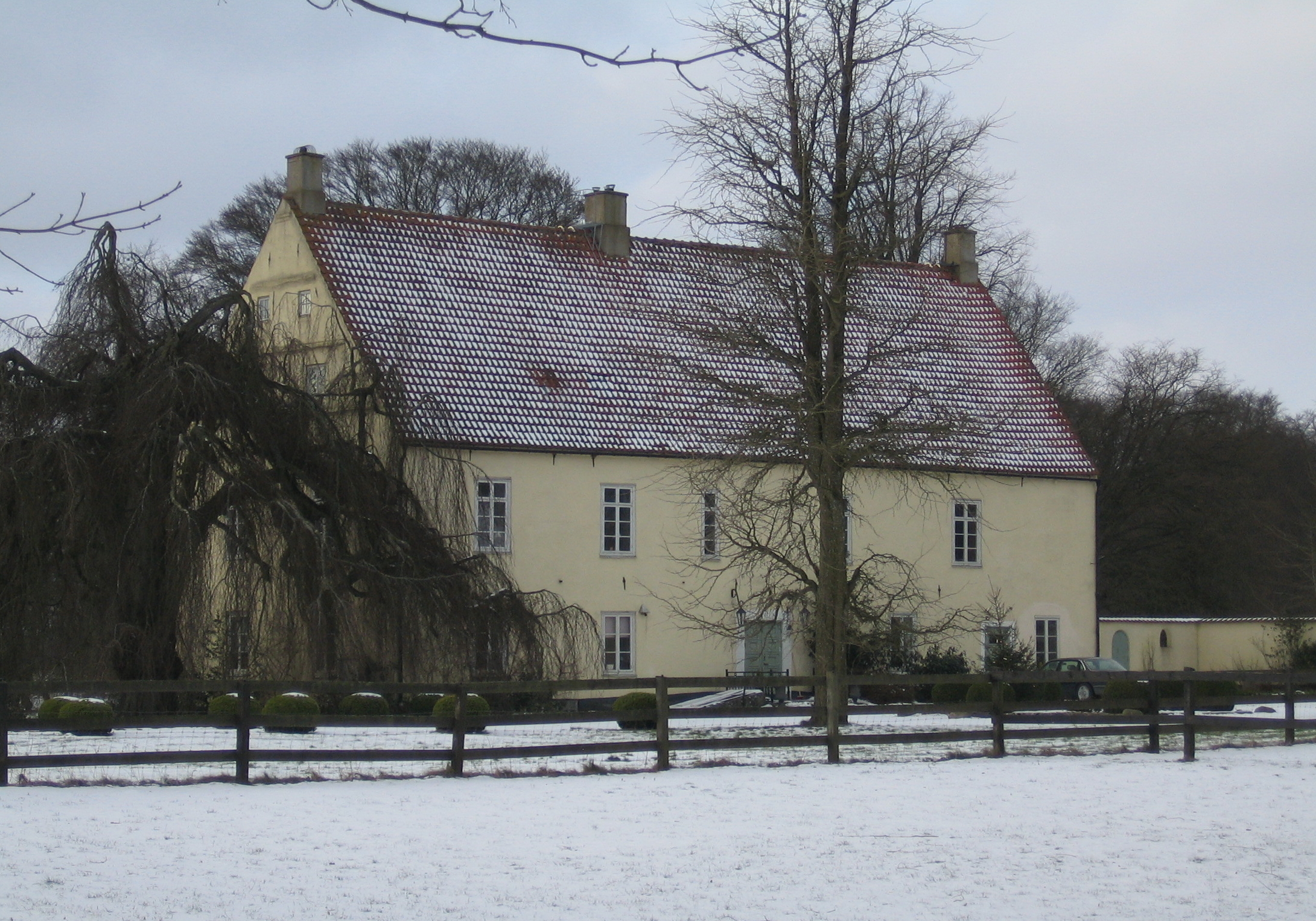
The ancient Smedstorp Castle owned by the Hemberg family until the late 19th century.

== Personal life ==
Hemberg was the eldest son of Carl Hemberg and Elisabeth Catharina Sjöstedt, born in 1763 in Maglehem congregation, Scania, Sweden. He married Maria Christina Giutzelke, daughter of the alderman Jacob Emanuel Giutzelke. Together they had four children, Carl Jacob, who became a well-known businessman and vice-consul of Ystad, Fredrik Elias "Fritz", a forester, Petronella Maria, and Adolf Ludvig, who also became vice-consul and a businessman. Hemberg died in 1834 from cholera, while serving in the Swedish parliament in Stockholm.

Jöns Peter Hemberg is the grandfather of the Swedish author and forester Eugen Hemberg.
