= Hemberg (ridge) =

Hill ridge in Hesse, Germany

Coordinates: 50°58′37″N 9°05′31″E

Highest point
- Elevation: 470.6 m (1,544 ft)

Geography
- Location: Hesse, Germany

Hemberg is a hill ridge in Hesse, Germany.
