= Pawin von Hemberg =

von Hemberg
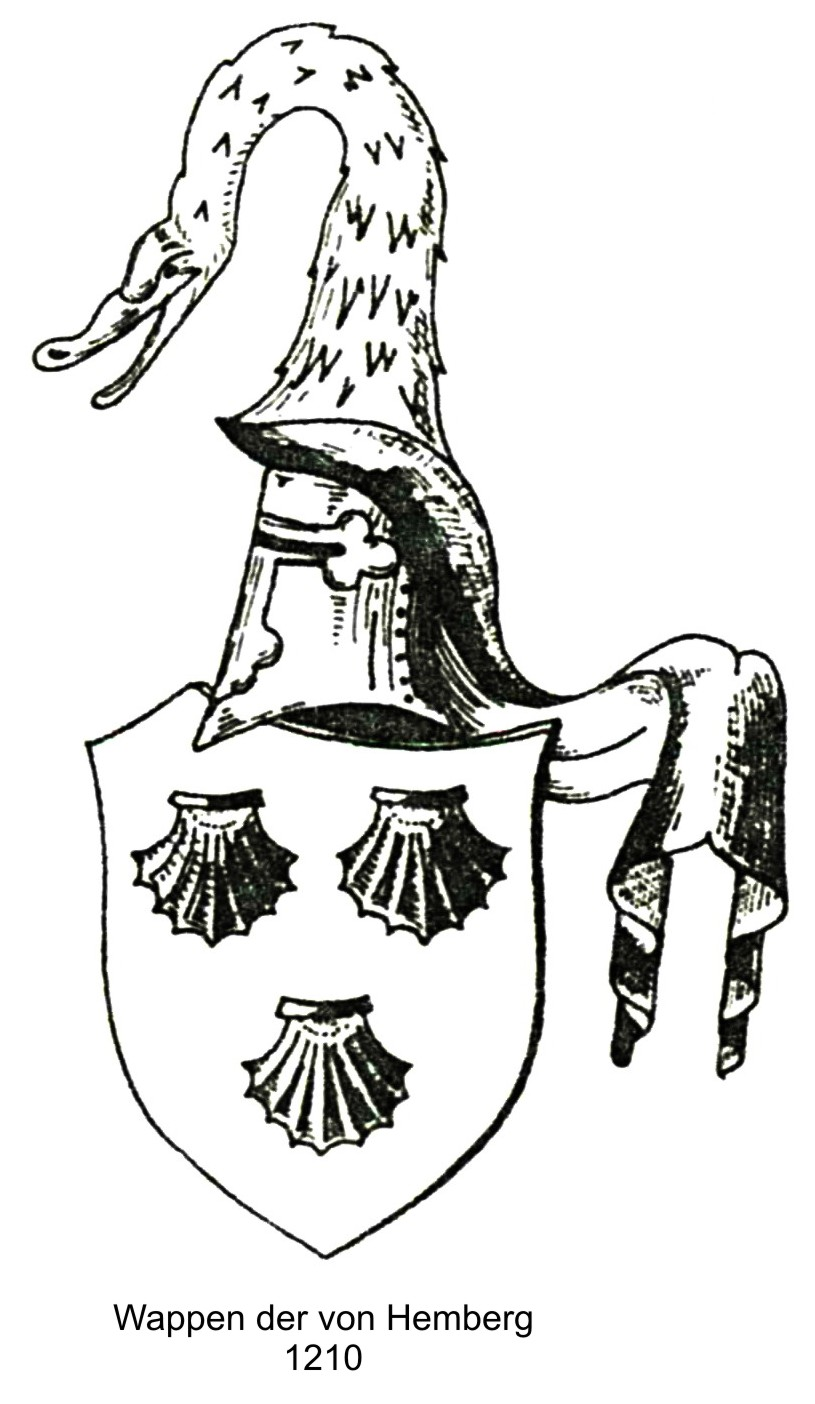
- Arms of the House of von Hemberg
- Origin: Bornheim, Holy Roman Empire
- Members: Albero von Hemberg, Pawin von Hemberg, Arnold von Hemberg
- Estate: Castle of Hemmerich

Pawin von Hemberg, was born ca. 1350 in the town of Bornheim, Rhein-Sieg-Kreis, in the Holy Roman Empire. He was the first in the noble von Hemberg family to be given the hereditary title of "Erbkämmerer", a sort of chamberlain to the archbishop of Cologne.

== Life ==
Pawin von Hemberg was a descendant of Albero von Hemberg, the first knight in the family von Hemberg to be associated with the castle of Hemmerich, located outside of Cologne. In 1395, Pawin von Hemberg was named the amtmann in Rheinbach.

Von Hemberg married the daughter of Werner von Bachem, who at the time held the hereditary title of "Erbkämmerer" to the archbishop of Cologne. Von Bachem renounced the title in the late 14th century, with the intention that von Hemberg and his descendants would be named his heirs to the title. This happened in 1402, when Rupert, King of Germany named von Hemberg the new Erbkämmerer to Friedrich III von Saarwerden the archbishop of Cologne, which made von Hemberg's family seat Hemmerich, a so-called "öffenhaus" to the archbishop.

In 1405, Pawin von Hemberg's son, Arnold von Hemberg was involved in a conflict with Johann Kessel von Nurbergh, upon which, Pawin expected Cologne to support his son. During the same year, von Hemberg sold one of his estates to the Hospital Brothers of St. Anthony, and it became known as "Antoniterhof".
