= Eugen Hemberg =

Swedish forester, author, and hunter

Eugen Peter Alexander Hemberg (9 November 1845 – 14 March 1946) was a Swedish forester, author, and hunter.

== Education and career ==
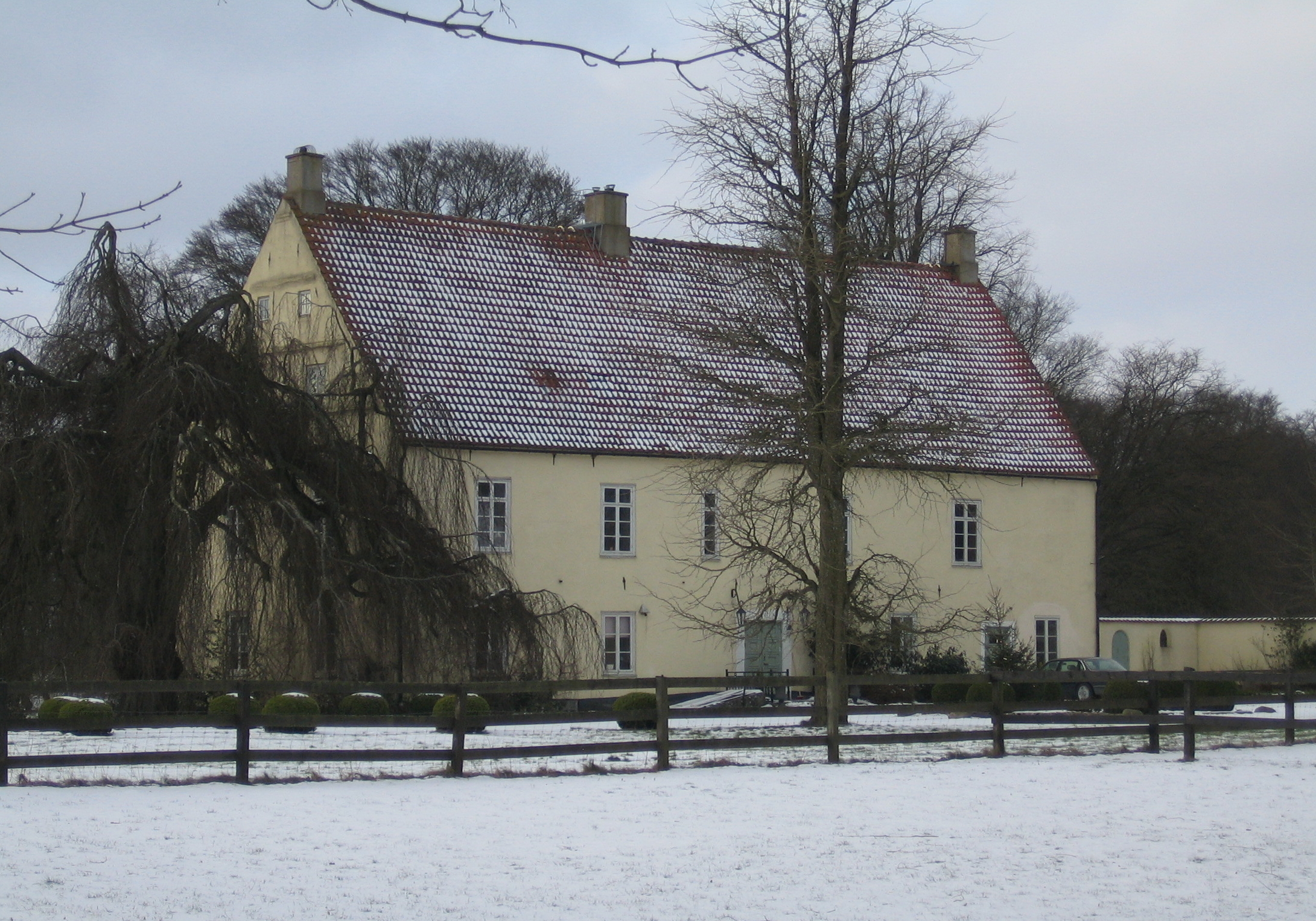
Smedstorp Castle, Eugen Hemberg's ancestral home.

Hemberg graduated with a degree in forestry from the Swedish Forestry Institute ("Skogsinstitutet") in 1869. After graduation, he began making long trips to Russia, Finland, Poland, Germany, and the Krkonose Mountains, where he explored and documented the local forestry and hunting. Upon Hemberg's return to Sweden in 1874, he began working in forestry management for the Swedish government in Kalix and Arjeplog, until 1878. Towards the end of the 19th century, he returned to Russia to continue documenting its hunting and forestry practices (1898–1899). In 1899, he was promoted to "The State's Forest Engineer" in Ystad and finally to 'head forester' in Kronoberg County, a role he held for over 15 years, 1904–1920.

Hemberg published several important books from his travels, including: Jakt- och turistskildringar från tsarernas land (Hunt and tourist depictions of the land of the Tzars; 1896–97), Jaktbara däggdjurs gångarter och spår (Huntable mammals' gaits and tracks; 1897–1915), Från Kola och Ural (From Kola and Ural; 1908). Furthermore, he wrote the following historical fiction: Stenåldershorden (The stone-age hoard; 1923), and Varjagerna (The Wolf Hunters; 1924). Hemberg also published articles in the Russian crown's yearly forestry publication, Forets d'Oural.

Hemberg was a passionate hunter, and at age 36 he was made a member of the Swedish Royal Hunting Club after a meeting with Oscar I, who spontaneously decided to surpass the voting procedures normally required for membership. He was also a guest in the Russian Empire's Hunting Club.

In 1896, August Strindberg visited Ystad, and through Dr Anders Eliasson, Hemberg and Strindberg met and developed a friendship over their mutual interest in nature.

== Personal life ==
Hemberg was born on 9 November 1845 in Ystad, and died on 14 March 1946 in Växjö, four months after his 100th birthday. He was the son of the estate owner Fritz Eugen Hemberg and Clara Wilhelmina Åkerblom, and the grandson of Jöns Peter Hemberg. Upon his father's death he inherited Smedstorp Castle.

Hemberg married Agnes Mathilda Lundgren (1856–1902), who was the daughter of the alderman John Robert Lundgren. Together they had three sons, Robert, Jan, and Arnulf. Upon the death of Agnes Mathilda, Hemberg remarried, Elma, and had a daughter, Edit.

== Bibliography ==
- Jakt- och Turistskildringar från Tsarernas land, Stockholm, 1896
- På obanade stigar : jaktskizzer, sagor och noveller från Lappland, Bonnier, Stockholm, 1896
- Skandinaviska däggdjurs trampaulor. Monografisk studie, Stockholm, 1897
- Från Kola och Ural. Vildmarksbilder, Stockholm, 1902
- Stenåldershorden : De första människorna på Sveriges jord. av Eug[en] Hemberg, C. E. Fritze, Stockholm, 1923
- Varjagerna : en skildring från hedenhös, C. E. Fritze, Stockholm, 1924
- En nittioårings minnen : vandringar i kulturens och naturens tempelhallar, Scania, Malmö, 1936
