= Jönköping Airport =

Jönköping Airport Jönköping flygplats

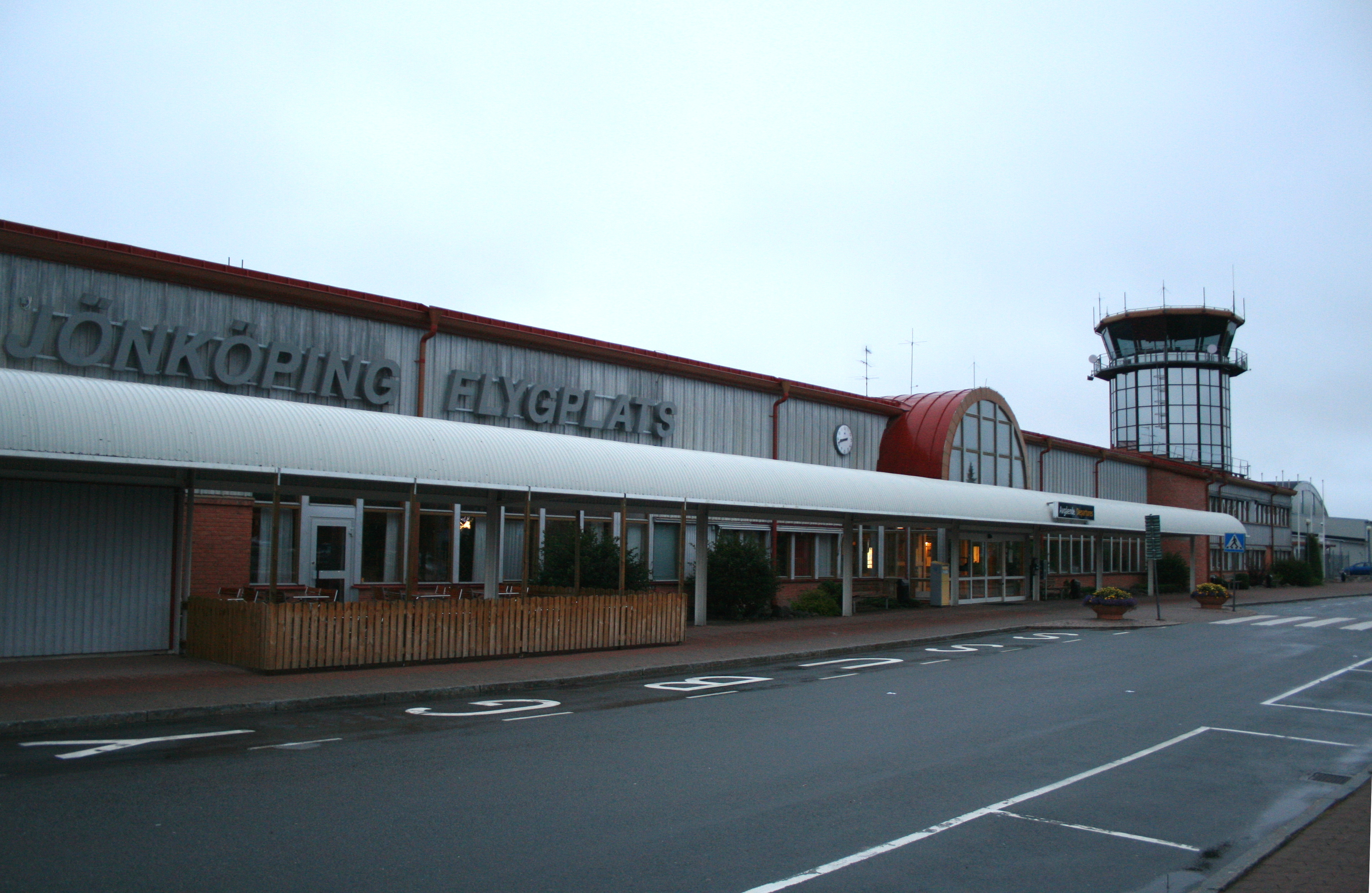
- IATA: JKG; ICAO: ESGJ

Summary
- Airport type: Public (City of Jönköping)
- Owner: Jönköpings Kommun
- Operator: Jönköping Airport AB
- Location: Jönköping
- Opened: 3 September 1961
- Elevation AMSL: 742 ft (226 m)
- Coordinates: 57°45′30″N 014°04′18″E
- Website: jonkopingairport.se

Map
- Airport in Sweden

Runways
Direction	Length		Surface
Direction	m	ft	Surface
01/19	2,203	7,250.6	Asphalt
11/29	600	2,000	Grass

Statistics (2019)
- Passengers total: 66,601
- Aircraft movements: 4,964
- Statistics: Swedish Transport Agency

Jönköping Airport (IATA: JKG, ICAO: ESGJ), earlier known as Axamo Airport (Swedish: Axamo flygplats), is an airport located about 8 km (5 mi) from Jönköping, Sweden.

== History ==
The airport was founded and opened in September 1961 and was nationally owned until December 2009. It has been owned by the city of Jönköping since then.

It has lost many passengers, and was considered to be too small for a national airport. In 2008 it had 76,611 passengers, compared with 252,241 in 1998. The connection with Copenhagen has been closed and reopened a few times. The Stockholm route was closed in 2020. It had been declining for years and finally closed in 2020 after reduced demand as a result of the coronavirus pandemic. Many drive or take the train to their destination or a competing airport. The driving distance from Jönköping city center to the Göteborg Landvetter Airport is 122 km, to Stockholm Skavsta Airport 230 km, to Stockholm Arlanda Airport 363 km, and to Copenhagen Airport 326 km.

== Airlines and destinations ==
In addition to the nightly cargo flights to Belgium, Denmark, Finland and Germany, the airport only has charter flights and private flights. But also business, taxi and private flights as well as flights from the locally based flying club. Due to the COVID-19 pandemic and the economical consequences that followed, there hasent been any scheduled flights in traffic since 2020.

The following airlines operate charter flights at Jönköping Airport:

Airlines	Destinations
People’s Airline	Seasonal charter: St Anton (ends 7 February 2026)
People’s Airline	Seasonal charter: Ischgl (ends 7 February 2026)
Nouvelair	Seasonal charter: Monastir (ends 5 November 2026)
Sunclass Airlines	Seasonal charter: Rhodos (ends 1 October 2025)
Sunclass Airlines	Seasonal charter: Larnaca (ends 27 October 2025)
Sunclass Airlines	Seasonal charter: Palma de Mallorca (ends 16 June 2026)

== Statistics ==
=== Traffic figures ===
Traffic by calendar year
Year	Passenger volume	Change	Domestic	Change	International	Change
2023	21,854		662		21,192	
2022	15,604		574		15,030	
2021	4,257		1,178		3,079	
2020	12,172		2,601		9,571	
2019	66,601	▼33.7%	17,383	▼29.6%	49,218	▼35.1%
2018	100,504	▼11.8%	24,680	▼30.7%	75,824	▼3.2%
2017	113,916	▲1.3%	35,589	▲5.5%	78,327	▲0.6%
2016	112,506	▲5.2%	33,738	▲6.9%	78,768	▲4.5%
2015	106,923		31,546		75,377	
2014	95,133					
2013	93,993					
2012	77,670					
2011	82,805					
2010	73,000					
2009	62,918					
2008	76,611					

== Ground transportation ==
=== Bus ===
Line 31 (JLT) runs regularly from morning to evening, to and from the airport. Both weekdays and weekends. All trips start or end at Jönköping City Centre station (Resecentrum and Juneporten) both connecting to local, regional and distance buses and trains.

=== Taxi ===
In the arrival terminal there is a telephone direct connected to the local taxi company.

=== Parking ===
There is parking at the airport, short-term and long-term parking lots.

== See also ==
- List of the busiest airports in the Nordic countries
