= Kälvesta =

Coordinates: 59°22′55.71″N 17°51′13.42″E

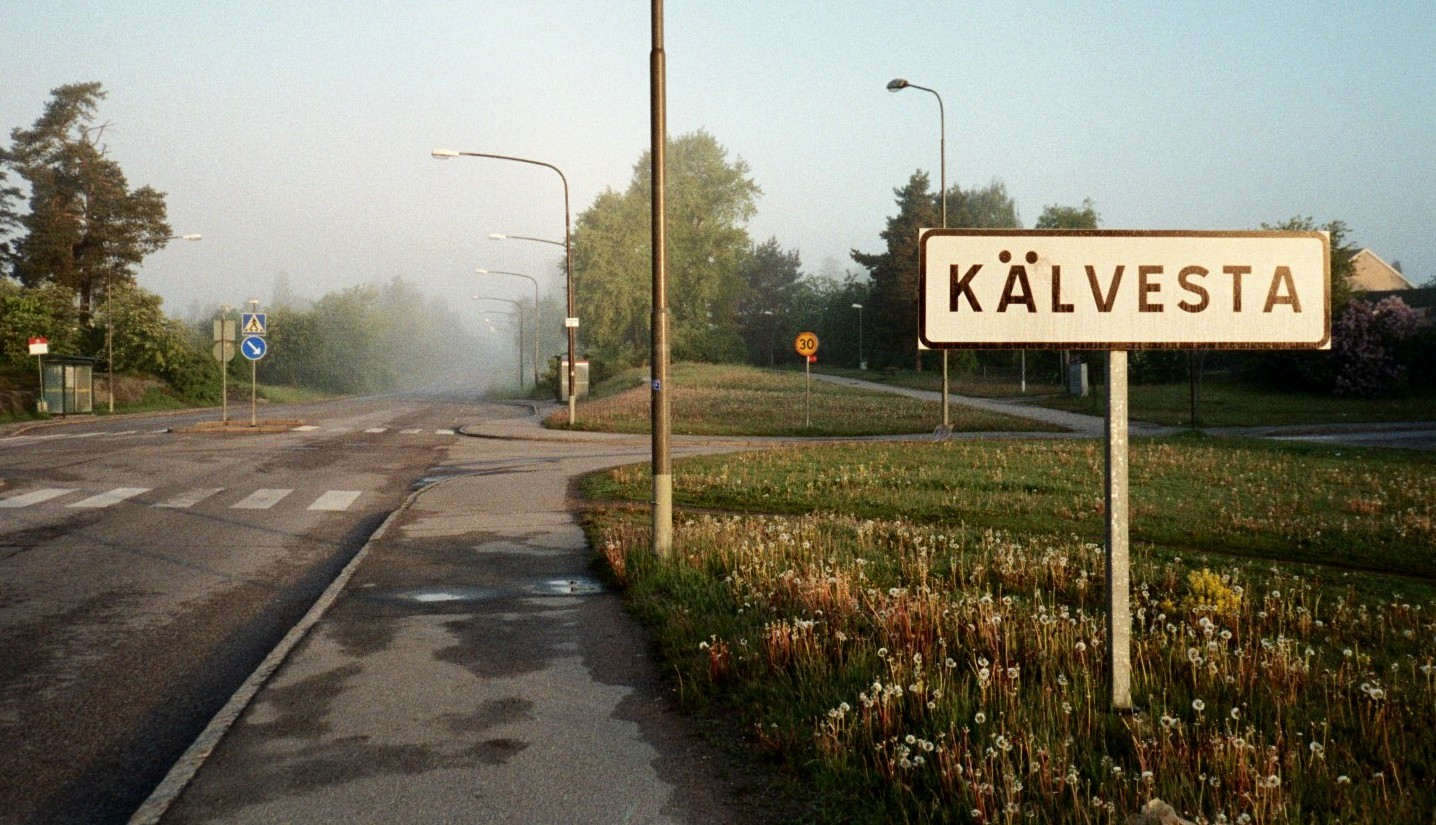
Kälvesta

Kälvesta is a suburban district in the Hässelby-Vällingby borough in western Stockholm. Most of Kälvesta was built during the late 1960s and the 1970s. Kälvesta has two middle schools (Sörgårdsskolan and Björnbodaskolan). The two buses 119 and 116 pass through Kälvesta on their way to either Spånga Station or Vällingby Centrum.

In 1977 Linjeflyg Flight 618 crashed in the area killing all 22 aboard, including table tennis player Hans Alsér.
