= Vittskövle Castle =

Building in Kristianstad Municipality, Skåne County, Sweden

- Vittskövle slott/Widtskövle slott
- Kristianstad Municipality
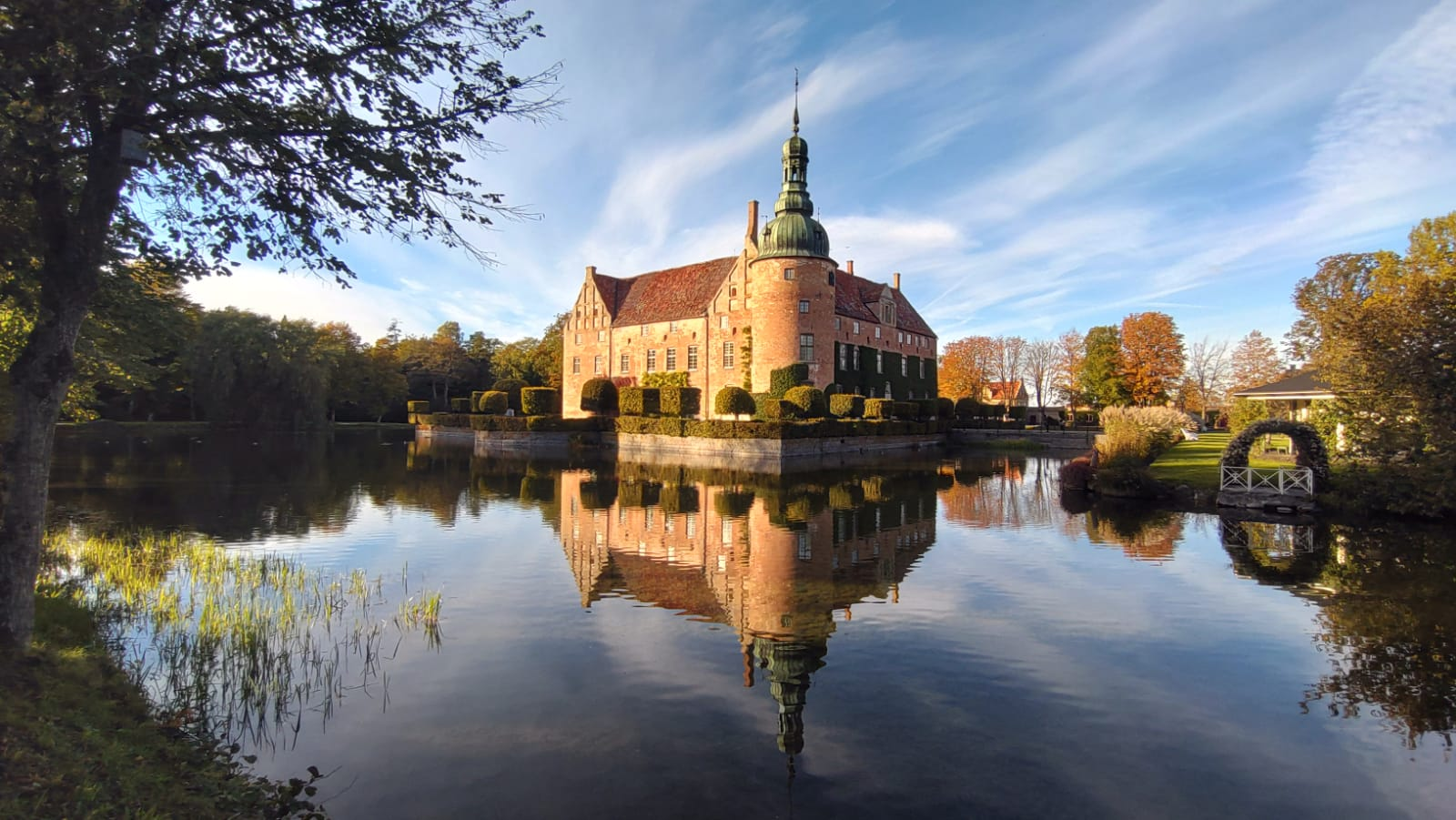
- Vittskövle Castle

Site information
- Type: Castle
- Open to the public: No

Location
- Scania, Sweden
- Location within Skåne
- Coordinates: 55.8548°N 14.1334°E

Site history
- Built: 1553-1577; 449 years ago

Vittskövle Castle (Swedish: Vittskövle slott also Widtskövle slott) is an estate in Kristianstad Municipality, Scania, Sweden. It has one of the best-preserved Renaissance castles in the Nordic countries.

== History ==
During the late Middle Ages, the estate belonged to the Archbishop of Lund. The main house was erected by Jens Brahe (ca 1500–1560) in the 16th century as a defence structure. It was completed in 1577. In the 18th century, the northwest tower was damaged by fire, and the spire was rebuilt in a romantic medieval style. The park and gardens were mainly built by Adolf Fredrik Barnekow (1744–87). In the early 19th century, the castle was redecorated with murals and ceiling paintings by the Swedish artist Christian Laurentius Gernandt (1765–1825). Vittskövle has been owned by members of the Stjernswärd family since 1837.
