= Sterling Airways Flight 901 =

1974 plane crash and fire in Tehran, Iran

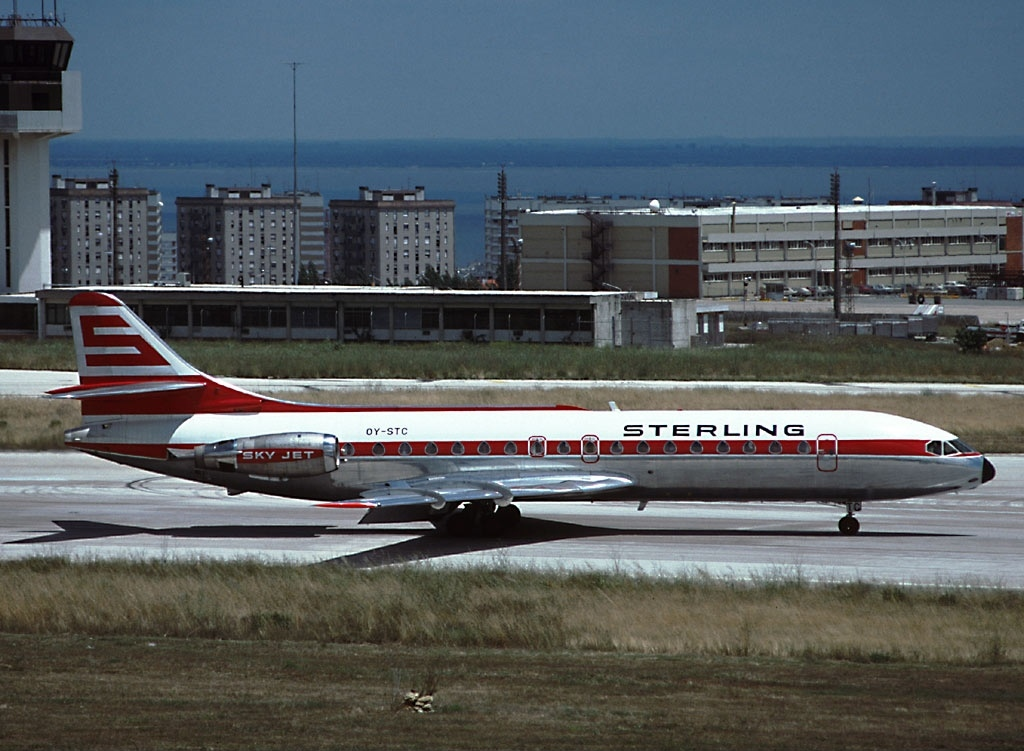
- A Sterling Airways Caravelle 10B3 similar to the accident aircraft

Accident
- Date: 15 March 1974
- Summary: Crashed on take-off following landing gear failure
- Site: Mehrabad International Airport (THR) Tehran, Iran; 35°41′29.61″N 51°18′7.97″E

Aircraft
- Aircraft type: Sud Aviation SE-210 Caravelle 10B3
- Operator: Sterling Airways
- Call sign: STERLING 901
- Registration: OY-STK
- Flight origin: Mehrabad International Airport (THR) Tehran, Iran
- Destination: København-Kastrup Airport (CPH/EKCH), Denmark
- Passengers: 92
- Crew: 4
- Fatalities: 15
- Injuries: 37
- Survivors: 81

On 15 March 1974, Sterling Airways Flight 901, a Sud Aviation Caravelle operated by Sterling Airways, experienced a landing gear failure as it was taxiing for take-off. The right main landing gear collapsed, which caused the right wing to contact the runway, rupturing a fuel tank and igniting the spilt fuel. The fire killed 15 passengers and injured 37 passengers and crew. The aircraft had been chartered by tour company Tjæreborg to take tourists around Asia, and was on the way back to Copenhagen when the accident happened. The accident came only two years after the crash of Sterling Airways Flight 296.

== Aircraft ==
The aircraft involved in the accident was a Sud Aviation SE-210 Caravelle 10B3, registered as OY-STK. The aircraft made its first flight in 4 April 1970 and was delivered to Sterling Airways on 6 May 1970.

== Passengers and crew ==
The aircraft was carrying 96 people of which 92 were passengers, two were pilots and two were cabin crew. The captain was 38-year-old Leif Knud Jørgensen, who had been with Sterling Airways since 1967, a captain since 1970 and had 9,600 flying hours. The co-pilot was Raimo Uski from Finland, who had 6,000 flying hours. The cabin crew consisted of 24-year-old Anne Bräuner and 22-year-old Bente Steffensen, both from Denmark. According to Danish newspaper Politiken, the nationalities of the passengers and crew were the following:

| Nationality | Passengers | Crew | Total | Fatalities |
|---|---|---|---|---|
| Denmark | 46 | 3 | 49 | 7 |
| Sweden | 36 | - | 36 | 8 |
| West Germany | 4 | - | 4 | - |
| Norway | 2 | - | 2 | - |
| Finland | - | 1 | 1 | - |
| France | 1 | - | 1 | - |
| Total | 92 | 4 | 96 | 15 |

== Accident ==
The Sud Aviation Caravelle had been chartered by travel agency Tjæreborg to take tourists on a tour around Asia. The tour had started in Copenhagen on 2 March 1974 and had taken the tourists to several cities, among them Shiraz, Bangkok, Hong Kong and New Delhi. The tour, on its 14th day, was making a quick refuelling stop at Tehran, before flying back to Copenhagen. As the aircraft was taxiing to the runway, the right main landing gear suddenly collapsed, causing a fuel tank in the right wing to rupture and spill fuel which then ignited.

== Investigation ==
Soon after news of the accident had reached Copenhagen, the Danish Accident Investigation Board dispatched a team to Tehran, along with technicians from the Danish police and experts in identifying bodies. The AIB team was to assist the Iranian investigation team. Before the investigation began it was suspected that either metal fatigue or loss of hydraulics caused the accident. On the 30 March 1974 the AIB team released a statement stating that the probable cause of the accident was failure of the right main landing gear. As the landing gear was torn off, the fuel tank inside the wing ruptured, causing fuel to spill which then ignited. The accident report attributed the undercarriage collapse to a structural failure of the lower 'candelabra' fitting.
