= Sterling Airlines =

Danish low-cost airline

Sterling Airways - Sterling European Airlines - Sterling Airlines

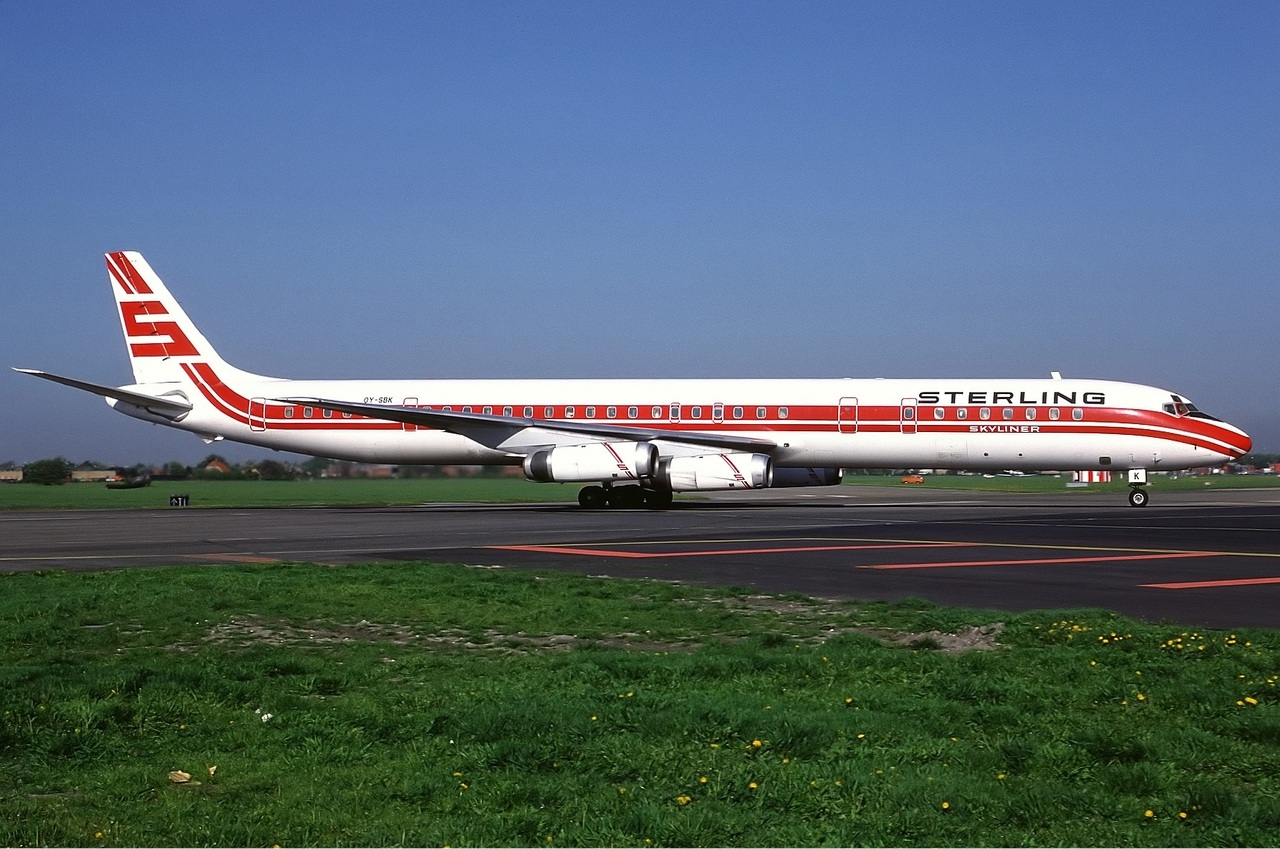
- Douglas DC-8
IATA	ICAO	Call sign
NB	SNB	STERLING
- Founded: 16 May 1962
- Ceased operations: 29 October 2008
- Hubs: Copenhagen Airport
- Focus cities: Billund Airport; Göteborg Landvetter Airport; Malmö Airport; Oslo Airport, Gardermoen; Stockholm Arlanda Airport
- Parent company: Northern Travel Holding
- Headquarters: Copenhagen Airport; Dragør, Dragør Municipality, Denmark
- Key people: Reza Taleghani (CEO)

Sterling Airlines A/S was a low-cost airline with headquarters at Copenhagen Airport South in Dragør, Denmark. It was created in September 2005 through the merger of two Danish airlines — Sterling European Airlines and Maersk Air — which had been acquired by the Icelandic investment group Fons Eignarhaldsfélag. One month after the merger, the new airline was sold to FL Group. At the end of 2005, Sterling Airlines had a staff of 1,600 and 29 aircraft and flew to some 40 European destinations, with Copenhagen Airport, Oslo Airport, Gardermoen and Stockholm-Arlanda Airport as primary hubs.

In December 2006, the air carrier was sold again, this time to Nordic Travel Holding. In 2008 Sterling filed for bankruptcy and ceased operations, and fellow air carrier Cimber Air purchased the airline's assets including Sterling's name, website and landing slots, but not the fleet.

In December 2008, Cimber Air acquired selected assets of the bankrupt carrier, including the Sterling name, Air Operator’s Certificate, website and landing slots. The resulting airline operated as Cimber Sterling from 2009 until it itself filed for bankruptcy on 3 May 2012.

== History ==
=== Origins ===
In the early years after World War II, Lutheran pastor Ejlif Egon Richard Søndergaard Krogager organized the first trip from the town of Tjæreborg to Spain.

- 1951 - The pastor founded Nordisk Bustrafik to better manage bus excursions at affordable prices. The company was later renamed Tjæreborg Rejser, located at Tjæreborg a town near Esbjerg. After some time, trips were also offered by plane.

=== The birth of the airline ===
- 16 May 1962: Together with Jørgen Størling, Eilif Krogager founded Sterling Airways, with the aim of operating flights from Billund Airport. Two Douglas DC-6B were purchased to better service package tours from Scandinavia to the Mediterranean.
- 7 July 1962: First flight from Copenhagen to Las Palmas de Teneriffe with 93 passengers. At the controls was Anders Helgstrand, a former military pilot and later an instructor and test pilot for SAS. He would become the airline's president in the 1970s.
- 1963: Further DC-6Bs were acquired. Maintenance base activated at Copenhagen Kastrup Airport

=== The first jetliners ===
- 1965: Purchase of two Caravelles serie 10B3 jetliners, which allowed to reach destinations on the African coast of the Mediterranean, the Middle East, and Tanzania. A total of another 10 will be purchased later.
- 1966: The half-million passenger mark, also coming from Norway and Sweden, is exceeded, mostly to Spanish destinations.
- 1967-1968: Transport of Danish soldiers to UN garrisons in Cyprus and Gaza.
- 1968-1969: A total of 218 humanitarian flights to Biafra, with DC 6Bs flying from Sâo Tomé Island to the Uli airstrip.
- 1968: The company was separated from the Tjæreborg Group and started working with other travel agencies as well.
- May 1968: Delivery of a Fokker 27 Series 500 (stretched fuselage) for short-haul operations. It was equipped with 56 seats and easily convertible to an all-freighter.
- June 1970: Delivery of a second Fokker 27 for short-haul operations. It was leased to the UN in early 1973.

=== Challenging 1970s ===
- October 1970: First operation with an A.B.206 "Jetranger" helicopter
- 1971: Delivery of three Caravelle Series 12s, followed by another three the next year, a version developed in conjunction with Aérospatiale. In December, a Caravelle 10B crossed the Atlantic from Oslo to Gander with 99 passengers, the first of a series of charter flights to North America. By the end of the year, 10,000 passengers had been carried between Europe and the USA.
- 1972: Delivery of 13 second-hand Caravelle 6Rs purchased in the USA, but in May, three Boeing 727-200s were ordered. Their selection was very much influenced by the possibility of operating, fully loaded, one of the longest routes: Stockholm-Las Palmas de Tenerife.
- 14 March 1972: A Caravelle 10B3, operating Sterling Airways Flight 296 crashed in Fujairah Emirate while approaching Dubai airport in heavy rain, killing all 112 persons on board. The 106 passengers were bound to Denmark from a holiday in Sri Lanka.
- 1973: Options were signed on three Airbus A300B4s, which were never confirmed later on. The two F.27s were retired.
- 1977: Acquired regional airline Copenhagen Air Services.
- 1978: Eilif Krogager bought a resort still under construction on the Spanish island of Lanzarote, a complex which will be completed and opened in 1983.

=== Turning points ===
In 1988 Sterling was spun off from Tjæreborg Rejser, which is then sold to T.O. Spies on January 3, 1989. In September 1993 the airline suspends all flight operations and declared bankruptcy. In December part of the management of the previous company established Sterling European Airways with three aircraft and 182 staff. The company begins charter operations began with a fleet of Boeing 727s and Boeing 737s.

- 1996: The airline was bought by the Norwegian shipping company Fred. Olsen.
- 2000: Sterling brand was adopted during the year.
- 1 November 2000: Scheduled flights began to Málaga and Alicante to compensate for the decreasing charter business.
- 2001: More routes were added; it was also decided that Sterling should leave the charter industry and become a fully fledged low-fare airline.
- 2002: 21 new routes opened, primarily between Scandinavia and Southern Europe, but also from Copenhagen to Oslo and Stockholm.
- 2003: The fleet was expanded from six to eight aircraft and 11 more routes between Scandinavia and Southern Europe were opened. Passenger numbers reached a record high of 1.3 million, a 40% increase on 2002.
- 2004: The fleet grew to 12 aircraft.

=== Changes in ownership and trends ===
- March 2005: Fred. Olsen sold Sterling to the Icelandic investment company Fons Eignarhaldsfélag, owners of the small Iceland Express airline, and its managing director, Almar Örn Hilmarsson, was appointed new managing director for Sterling.
- June 2005: The Fons Eignarhaldsfélag bought Maersk Air airline from the A.P. Moller-Maersk Group and announced that they wanted to merge the two Danish airlines.
- 13 September 2005: The company merged with Maersk Air to form Sterling Airlines A/S. The fleet consisted exclusively of Boeing 737s. The merger was approved by the authorities; it turned to be the fourth largest low-cost carrier in Europe but only a month later Fons Eignarhaldsfélag sold the company to FL Group.
- 6 January 2006: Hannes Þór Smárason, CEO of the FL Group, stated that a merger with EasyJet was a possibility.
- December 2006: FL Group sold the airline to Northern Travel Holding, a holding company owned by the three Icelandic private equity companies FL Group, Fons Eignarhaldsfélag and Sons.
- 29 October 2008: Sterling ceased shortly after being declared bankrupt due to the rising fuel prices in the first half of the year and the Icelandic financial crisis that hit its major investor The entire fleet was grounded with immediate effect.

== Destinations ==
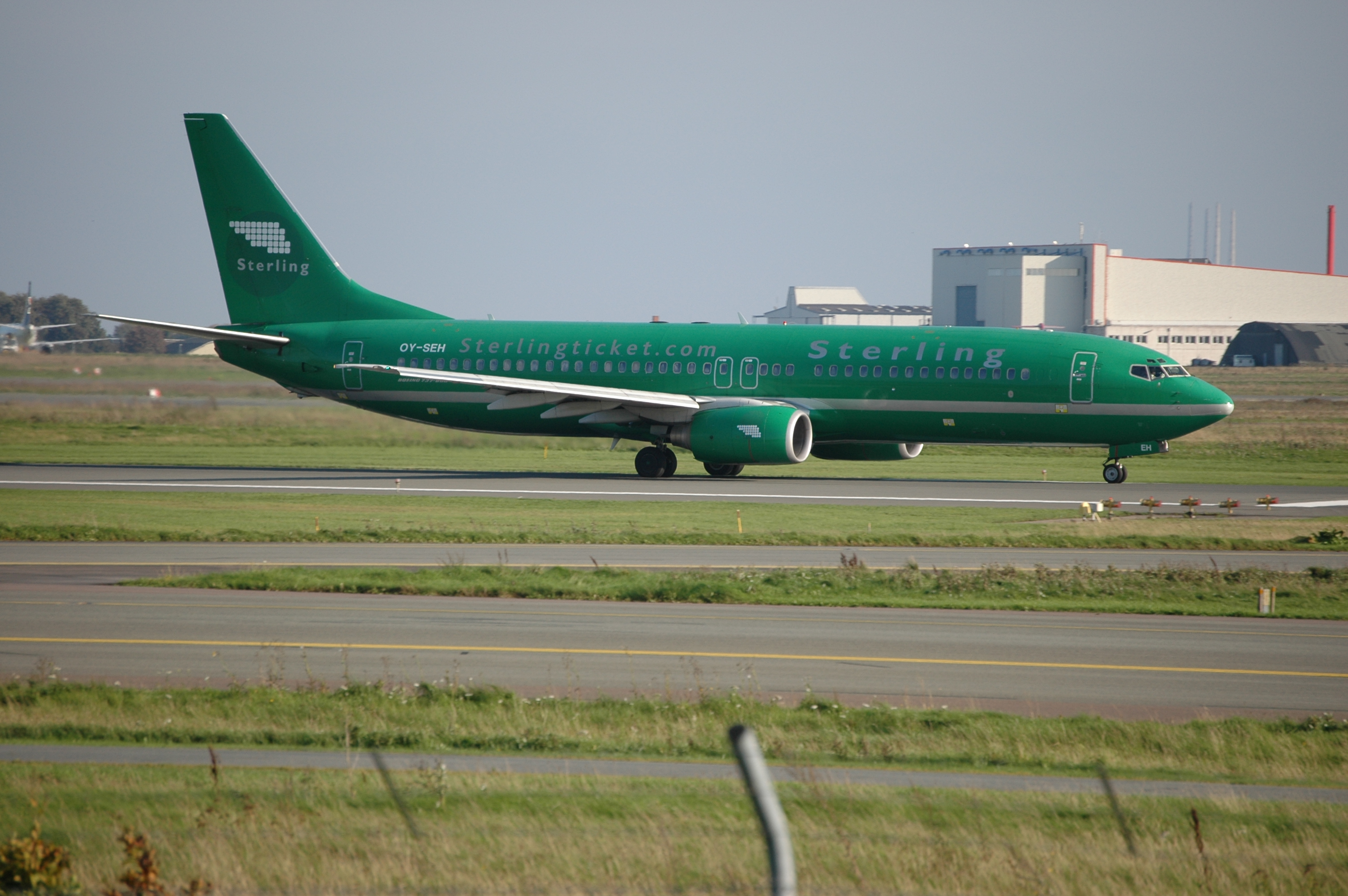
Boeing 737-800

At the time of Sterling's collapse the airline served these destinations:

- Austria (Salzburg),
- Belgium (Brussels),
- Bulgaria (Burgas and Varna),
- Croatia (Split),
- Czech Republic (Prague),
- Denmark (Aalborg, Billund, and Copenhagen),
- Finland (Helsinki),
- France (Biarritz, Paris, Montpellier, and Nice);
- Germany (Berlin),
- Greece (Athens and Chania),
- Hungary (Budapest),
- Italy (Bologna, Florence, Milan, Naples, Rome, Venice),
- Norway (Oslo Gardermoen and Bergen),
- Poland (Kraków),
- Portugal (Faro and Funchal),
- Spain (Alicante, Barcelona, Las Palmas, Málaga, Palma de Mallorca and Tenerife),
- Sri Lanka (Colombo),
- Sweden (Gothenburg, Malmö and Stockholm),
- Switzerland (Geneva),
- United Kingdom (Edinburgh, London Gatwick, and East Midlands),
- United Arab Emirates (Dubai).

== Fleet ==
Historically Sterling Airways operated several Sud Aviation Caravelle IIIs and seven Super-Caravelles 12. During the time between late 1970s and the 1993 bankruptcy, Sterling also operated three Boeing 727s, two Douglas DC-8-63s (stretched "Super DC 8") and one Super DC-8-62CF as well as an Aerospatiale Corvette.

The Sterling Airlines fleet included the following aircraft (as of October 2008):

Sterling Airlines A/S fleet
Aircraft	Total	Passengers	Routes	Notes
Boeing 737-500	4	126	Europe	
Boeing 737-700	15	148	Europe	
Boeing 737-800	7	189	Europe	
McDonnell Douglas MD-83	1	165	Europe	operated by FlyExcellent
Total	27			

=== Photographic gallery ===
Sterling Airways

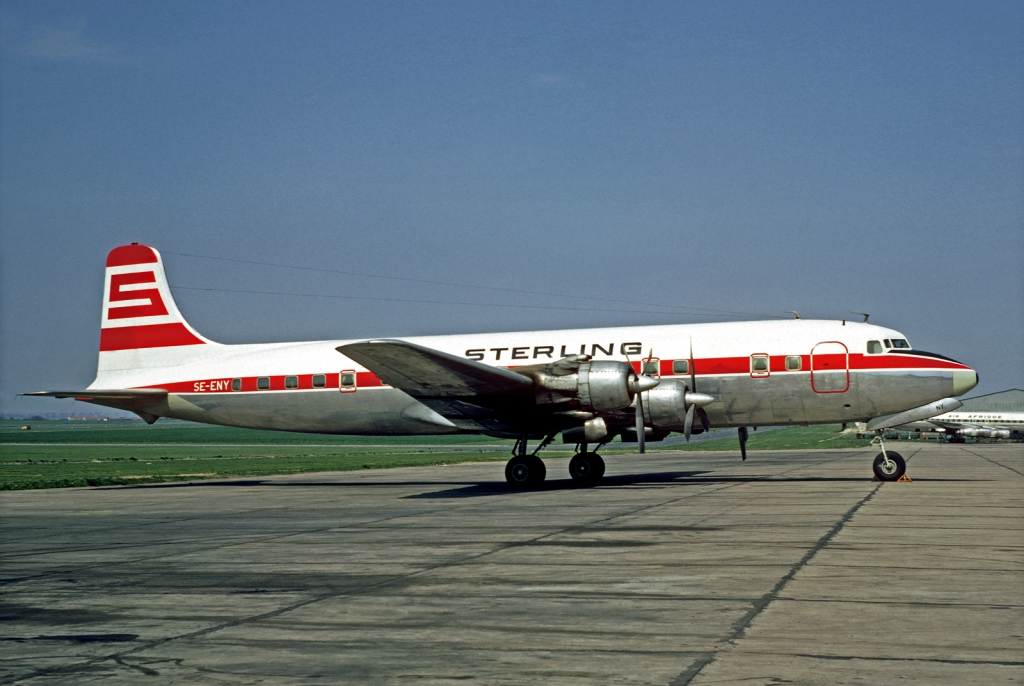
Douglas DC-6B

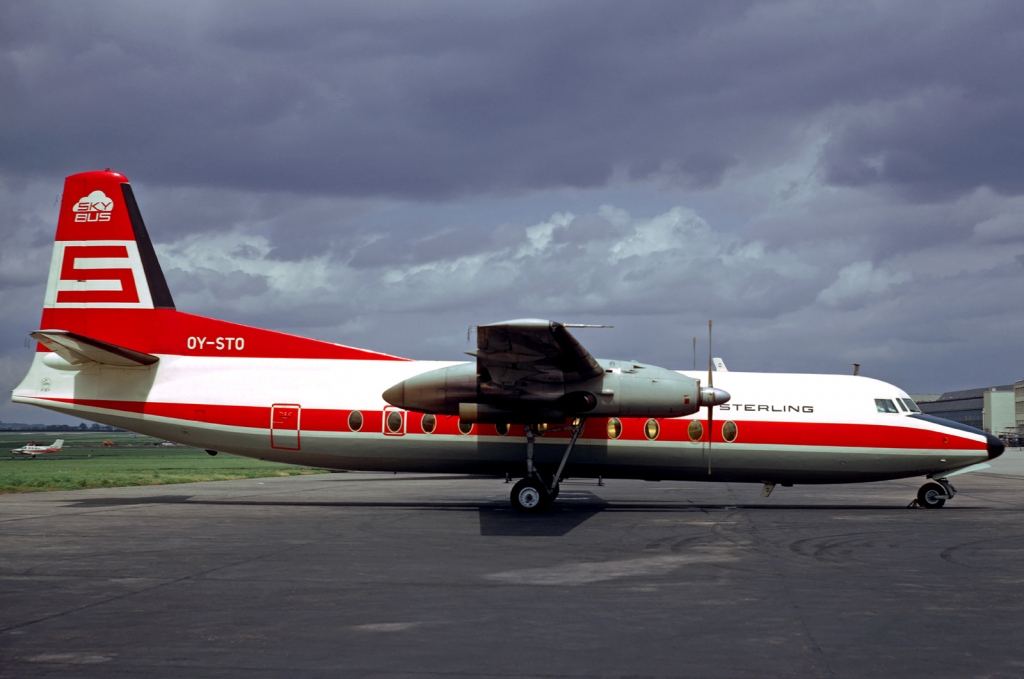
Fokker F-27

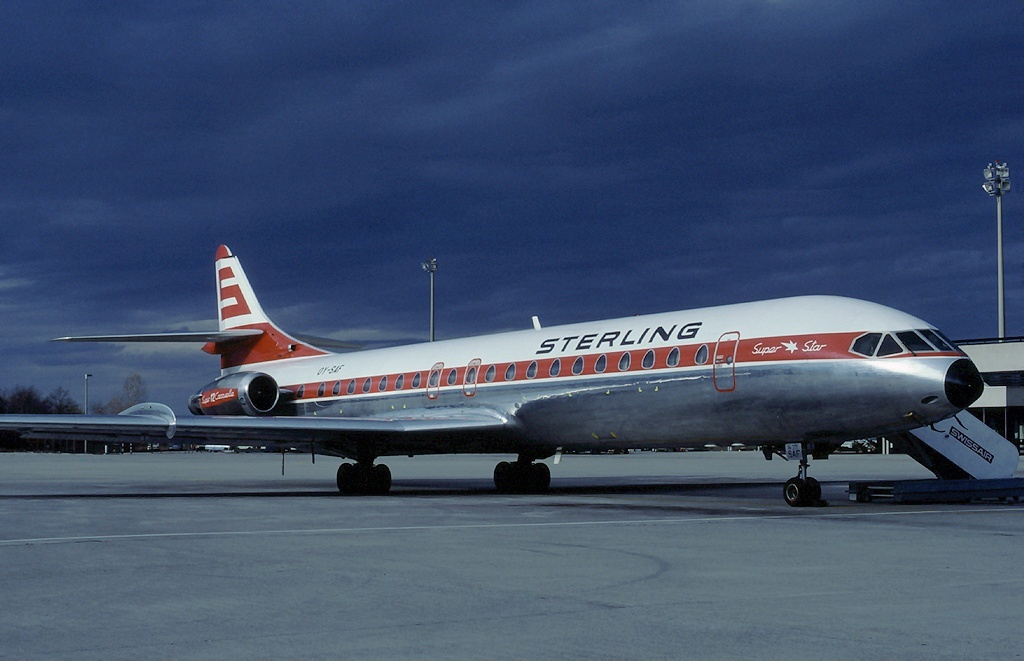
Sud Aviation SE-210 Caravelle series Super 12

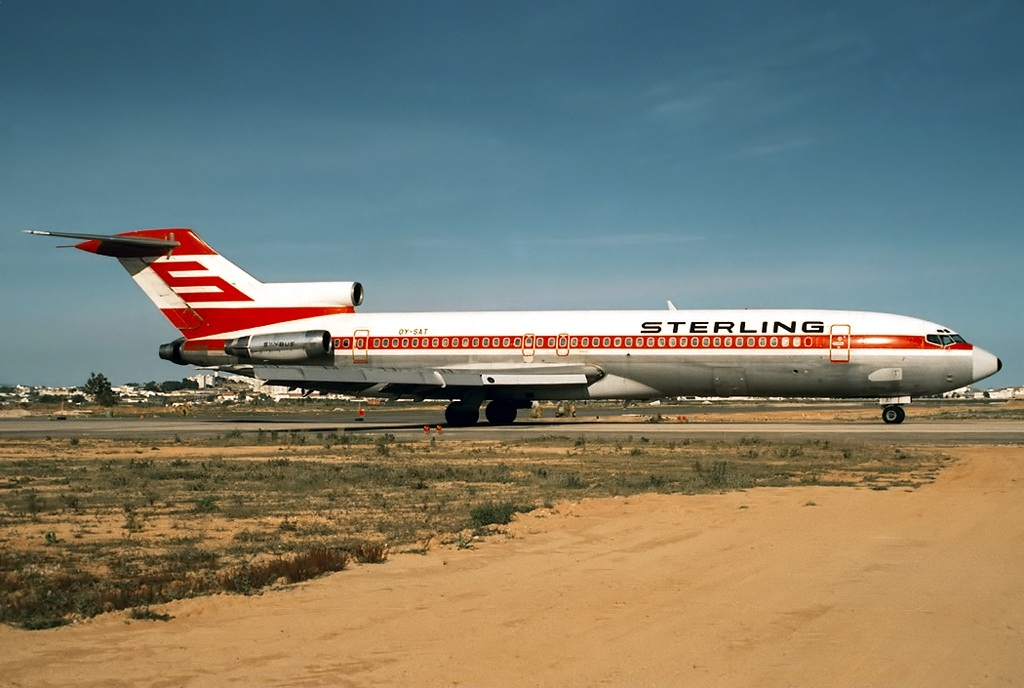
Boeing 727-200

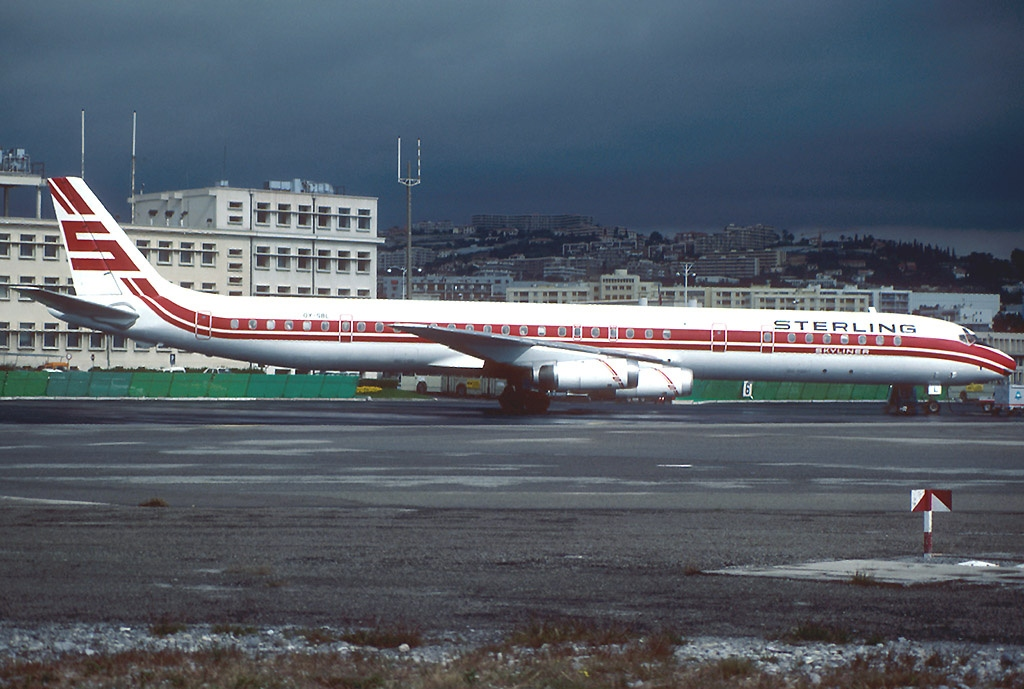
Douglas DC-8-63

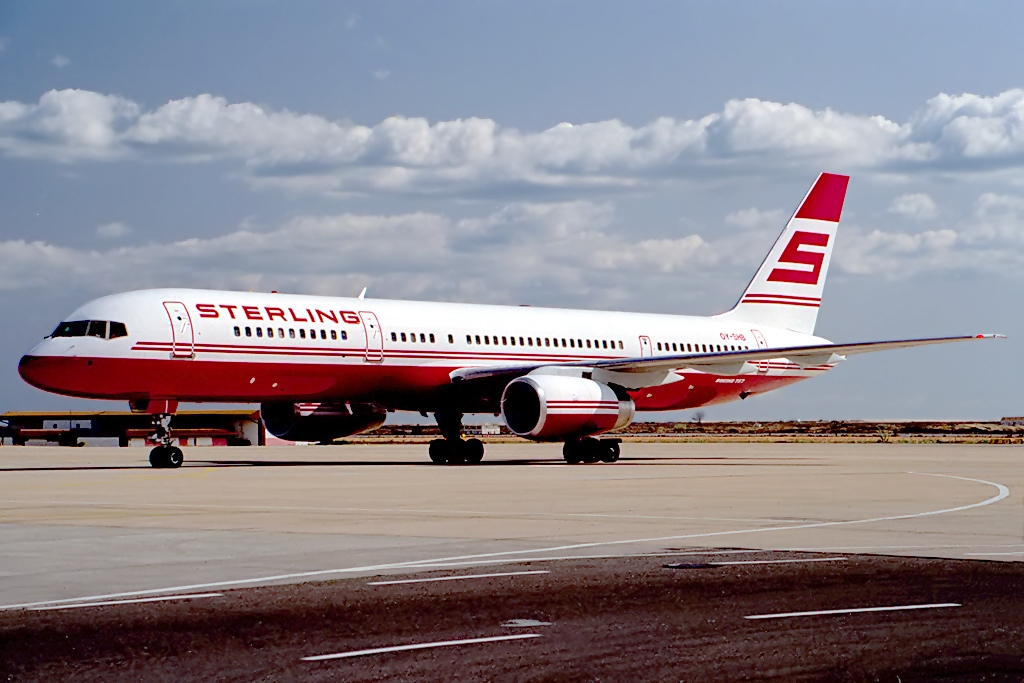
Boeing 757-200

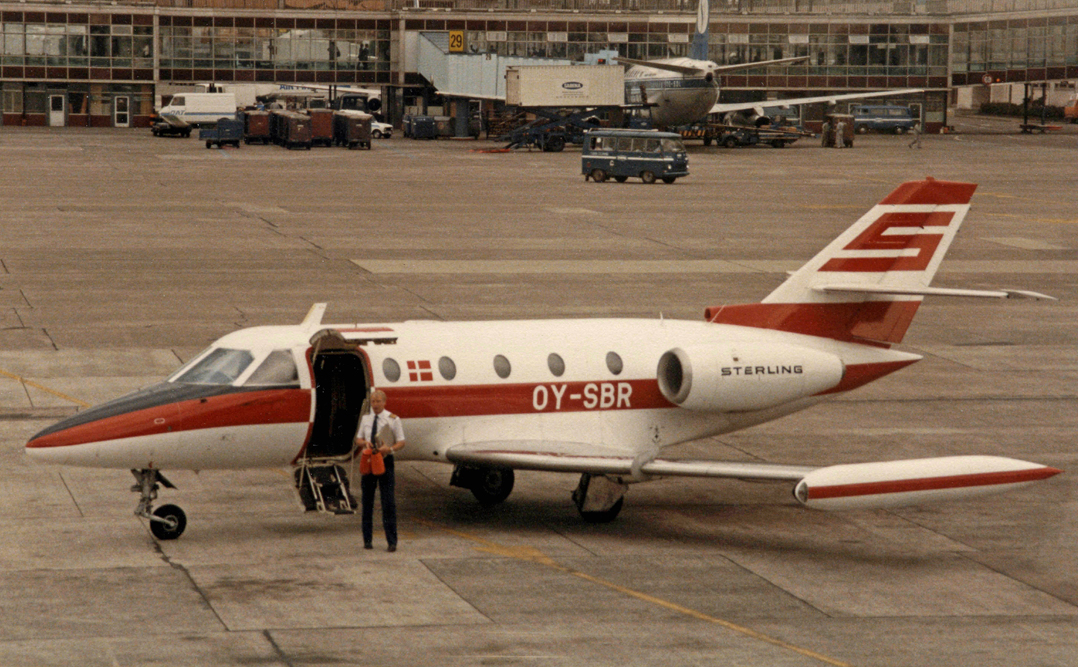
Aerospatiale Corvette operated charter and executive services, Brussels Airport in July 1985

Sterling European Airlines

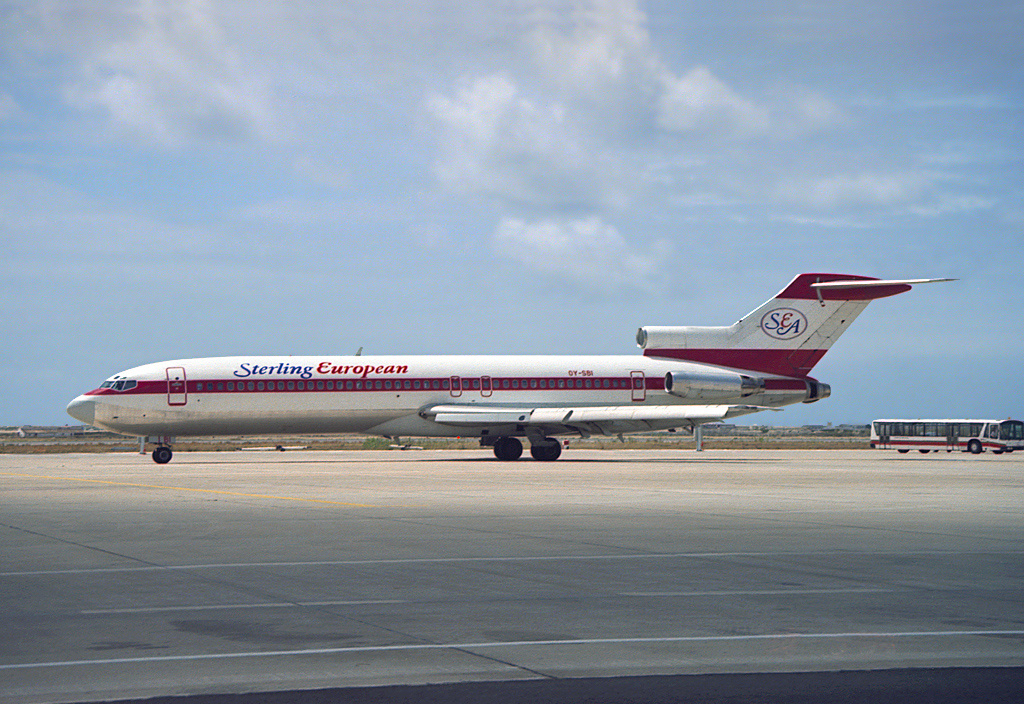
Boeing 727-200 showing the previous Sterling Airways basic livery

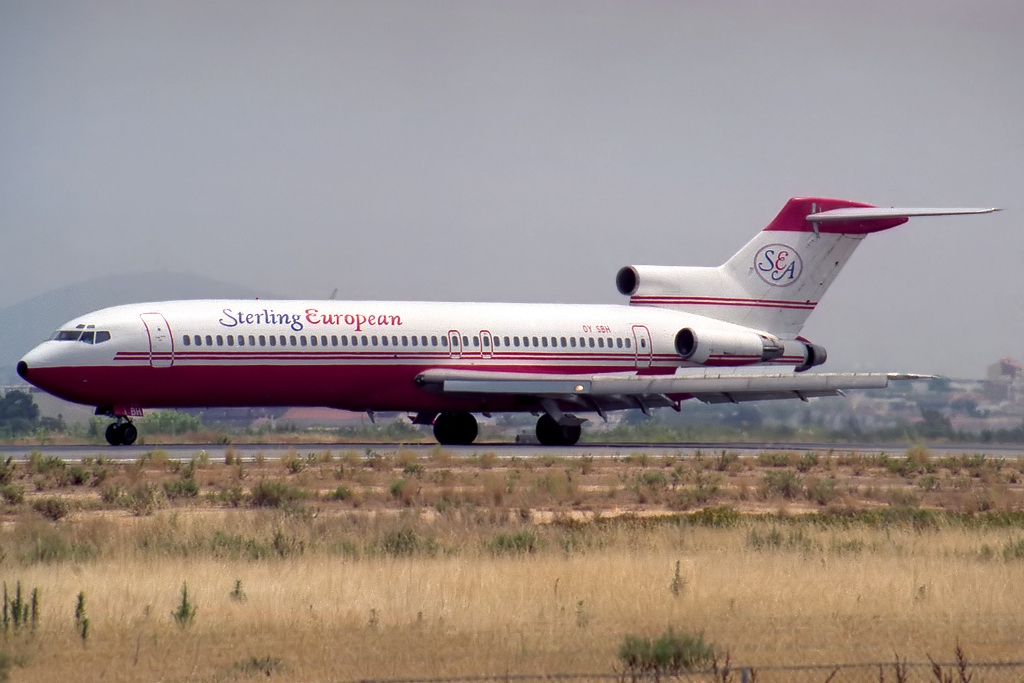
Boeing 727-200 showing the previous Sterling Airways basic livery

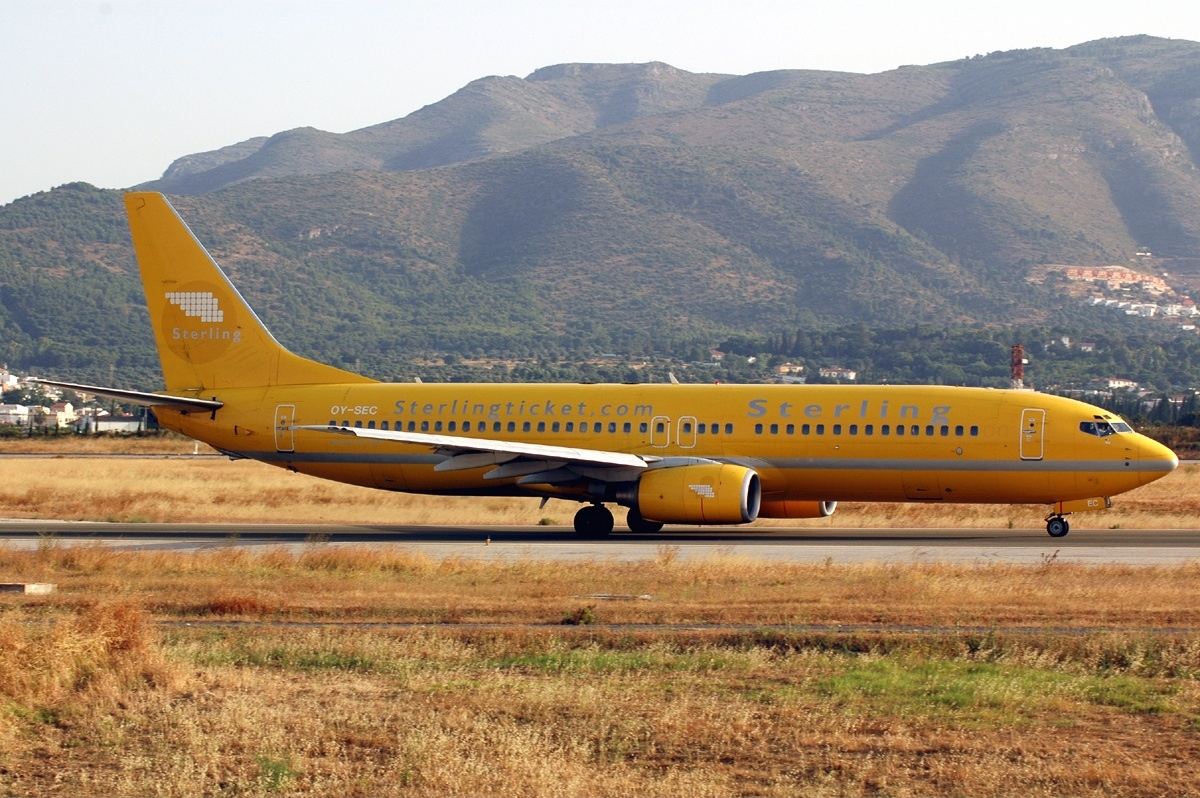
Boeing 737-800

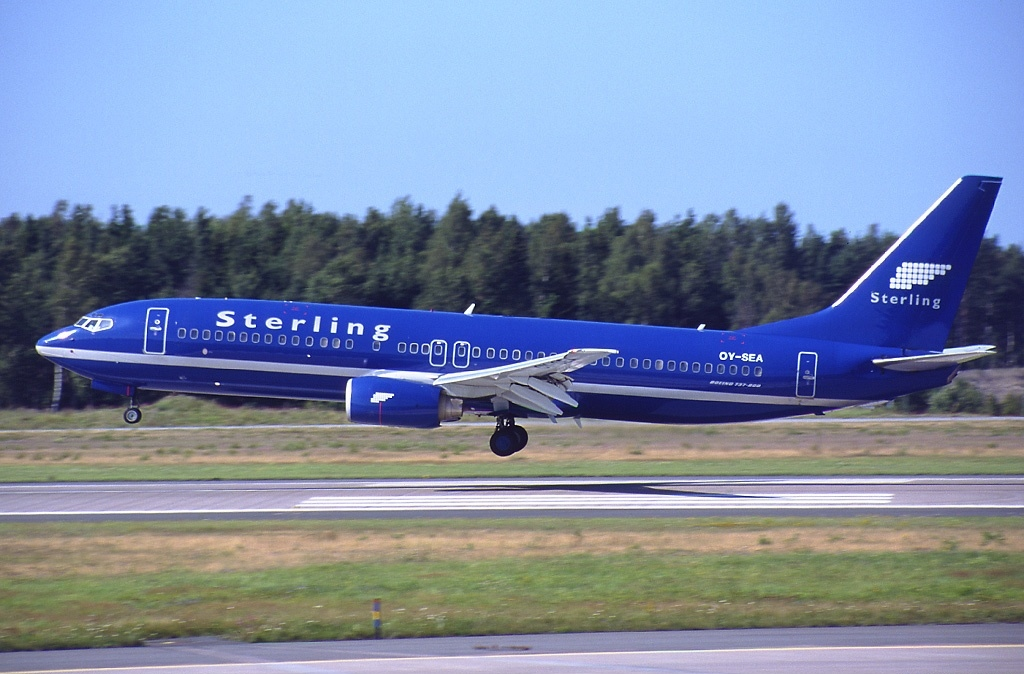
Boeing 737-800

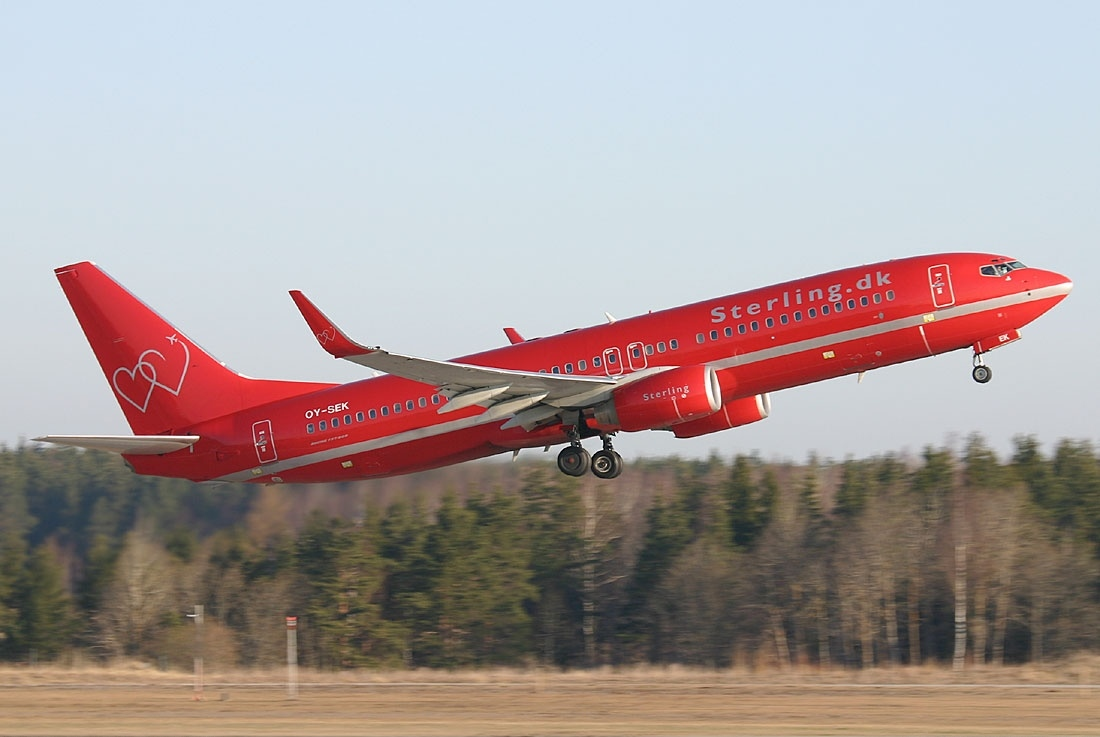
Boeing 737-800 with hearts on the tail

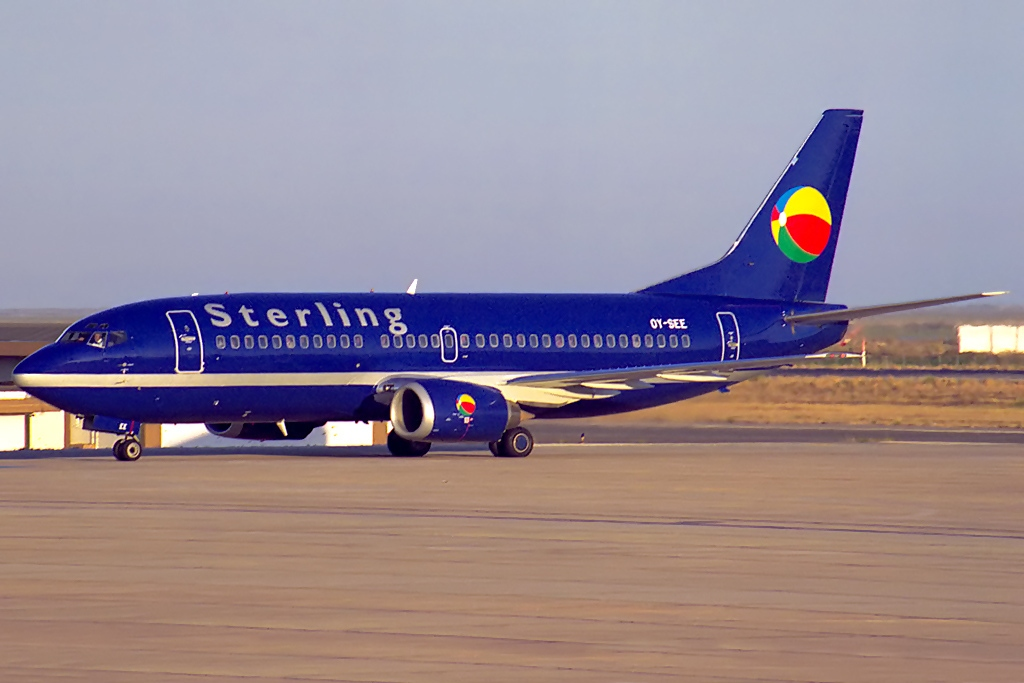
Boeing 737-300 in the latest colors

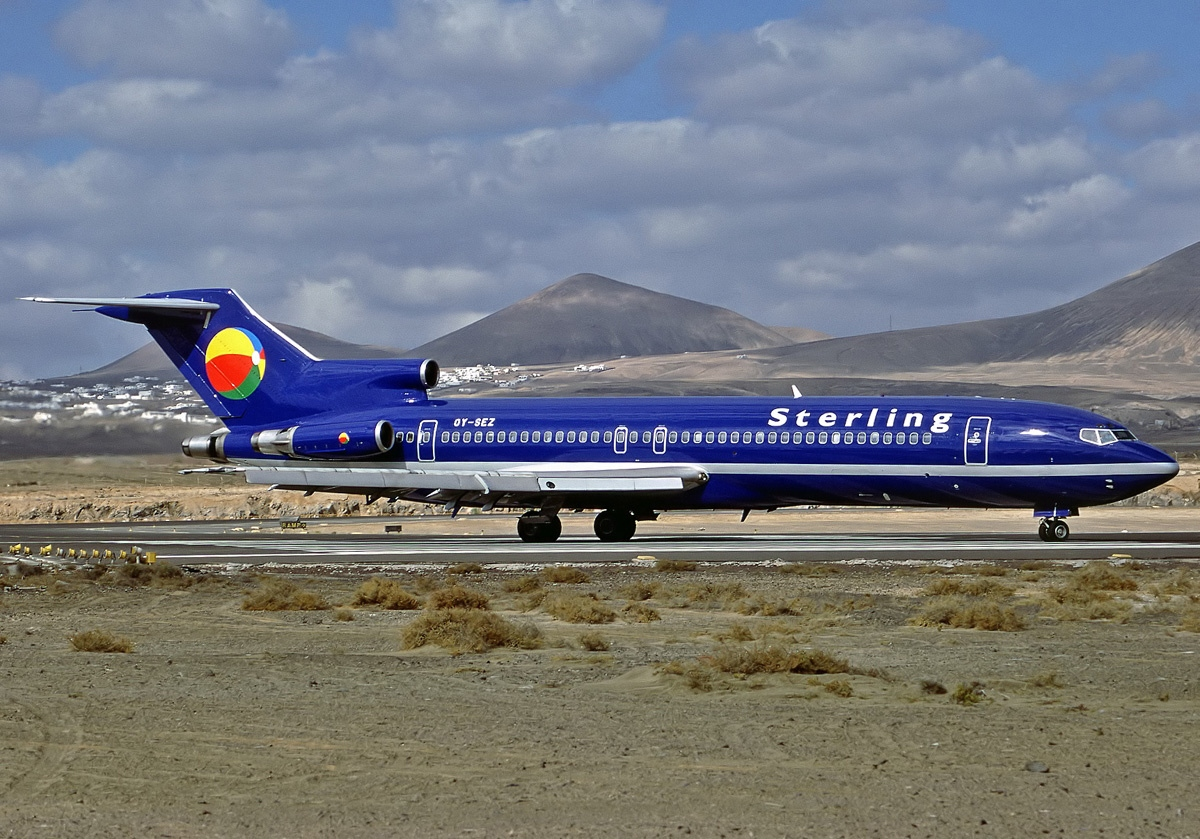
Boeing 727-200 in the latest colors

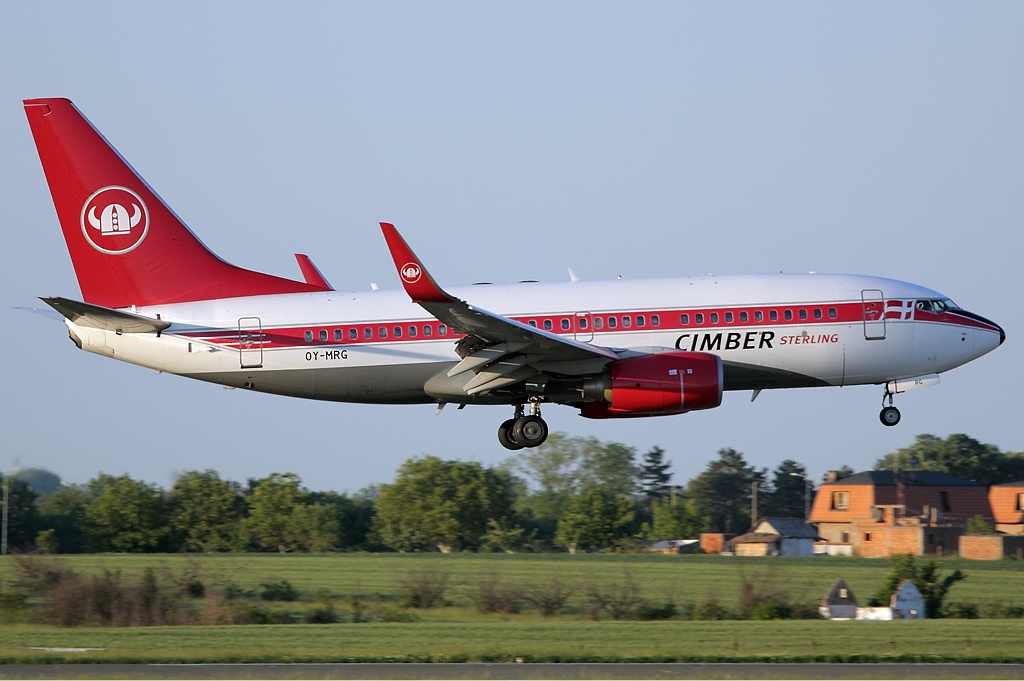
Boeing 737-700 with mixed Cimber Sterling titles

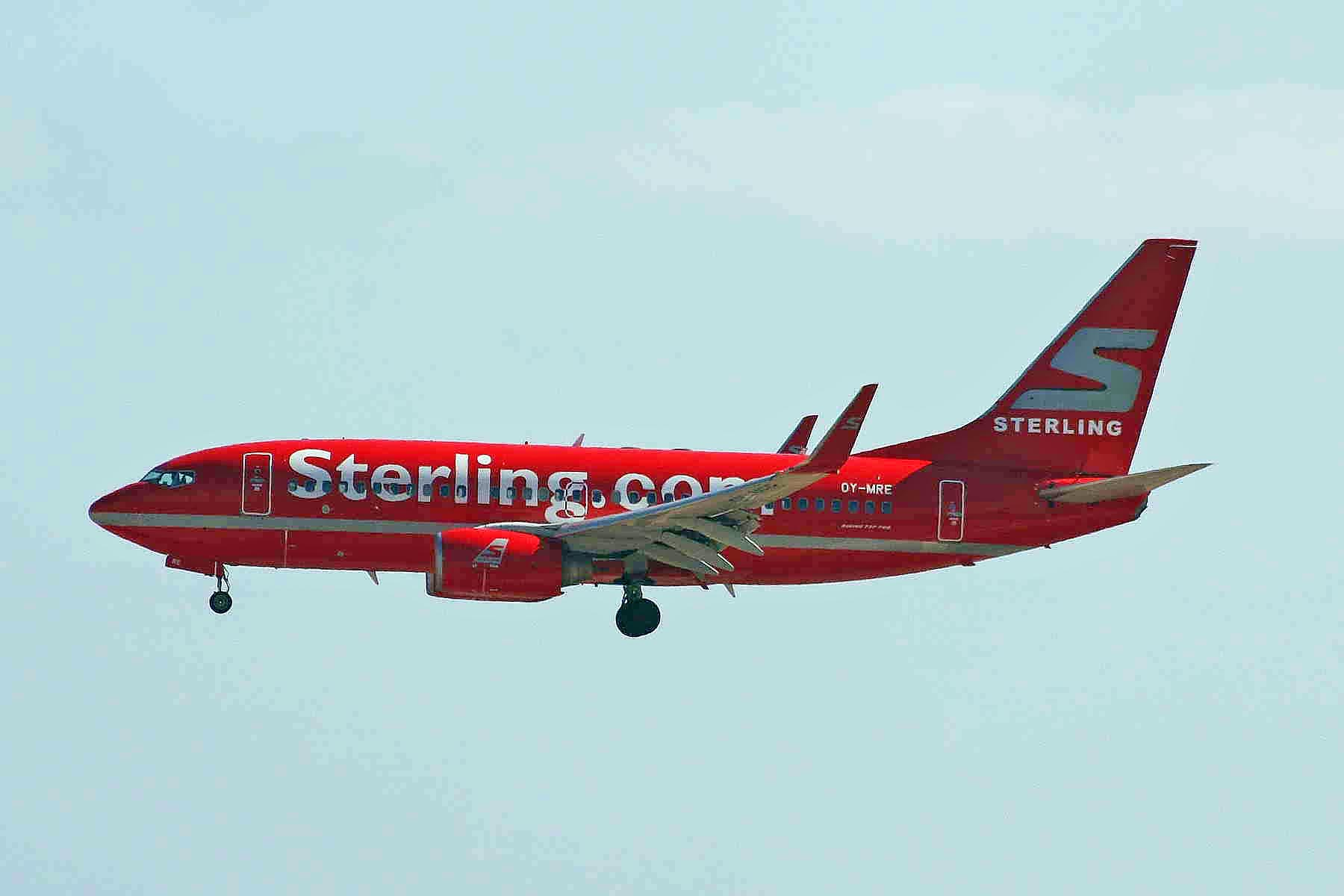
Cimber Sterling Boeing 737-700 with just the major titles

Sterling Airlines A/S

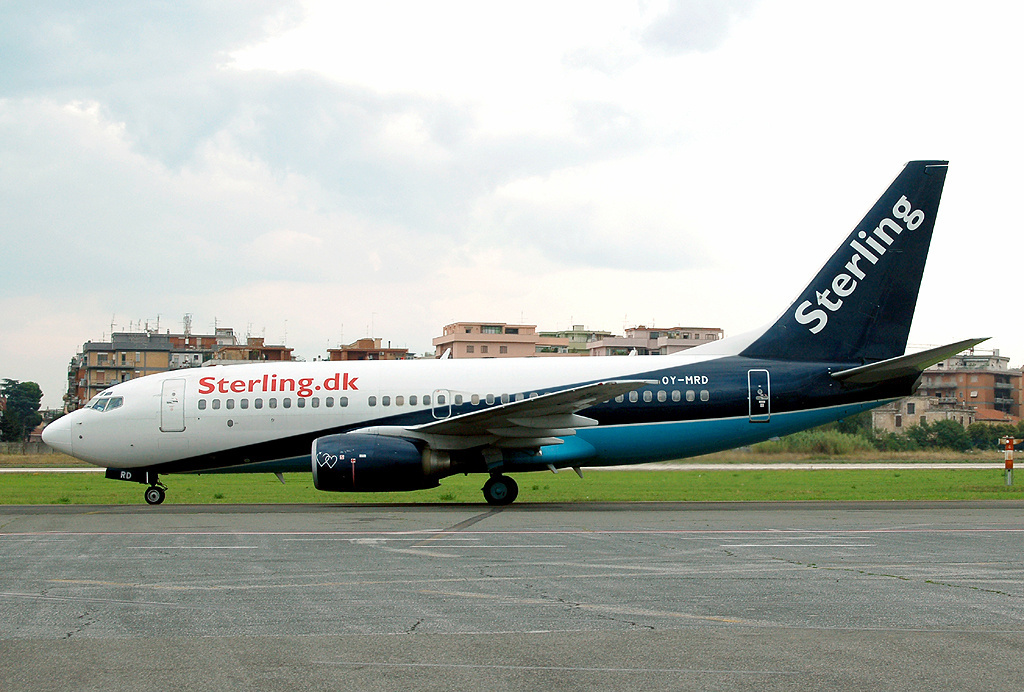
Boeing 737-700 in 2006

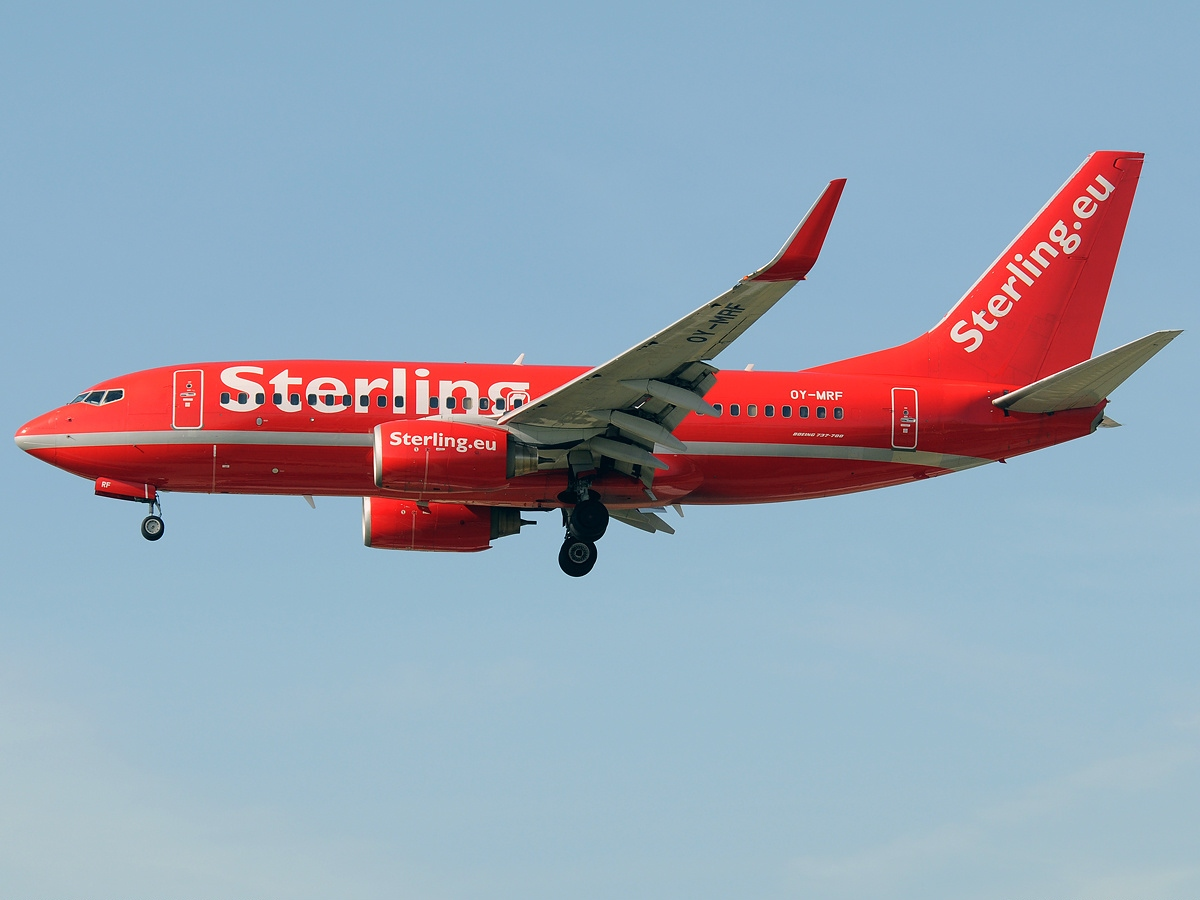
Boeing 737-700 in the latest livery

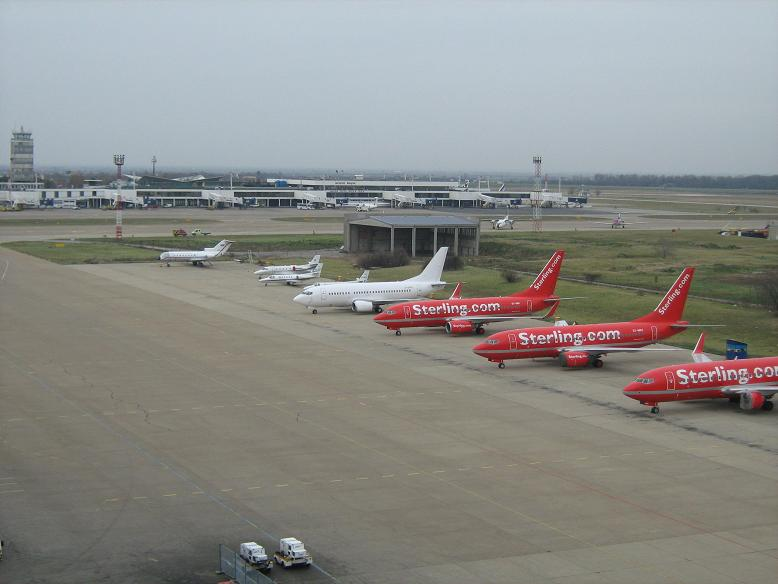
Boeing 737s parked at Beograd-Surcin airport

== Subsidiaries ==
=== Airlines ===
- Sterling Airways Founded in 1970, 2/3 Swedish-owned, to satisfy a domestic charter market where the offer seemed insufficient. The fleet consisted of two Douglas DC-6Bs and one Lockeed L-188. The company was closed in 1973.
- Sterling Philippines Operational since October 1975 and primarily engaged in unscheduled flights to Hong Kong. The fleet consisted of a Sud Aviation SE-210 Caravelle 10, later joined by a Douglas DC8 purchased second-hand in the USA. The company was closed in 1980.

=== Technical services, passenger services, ground services ===
- Flight Training Center Established in 1963. Various simulators and Link Trainers.
- Amfocas Fuel import and refueling to the parent company.
- OP Travel Bureau IATA ticketing and IT packages sales.
- Aero Chef Active since 1967. Catering complex with a capacity of at least 36,000 meals per day.
- Sterling Forwarders Established on November 1, 1970, for the transport of bulky cargo, primarily to Sweden.
- Sterling Spedition Cargo handling and also has a fleet of trucks.

== Incidents and accidents ==
- On March 14, 1972, Sterling Airways Flight 296, a Sud Aviation Caravelle, crashed into a mountain ridge on approach to Dubai near Kalba, United Arab Emirates. All 112 passengers and crew on board died in the crash, making it the deadliest air disaster in the history of the United Arab Emirates.
- 15 March 1974, Sterling Airways Flight 901, another Sud Aviation Caravelle, suffered a landing gear failure at Mehrabad International Airport, Tehran, Iran. As the aircraft was taxiing, the right main landing gear failed, causing the right wing to hit the ground and catch fire. 14 passengers died and 82 survived.
- 3 September 1979, Sterling Airways Flight 4133 an Aérospatiale Corvette (Registration: OY-SBS) crashed into the sea 1 km (0.62 mi) while approaching Nice Côte d'Azur Airport, France. The aircraft took off from Coventry Airport for Nice. All 10 passengers and crew died in the crash.
