= Gulf Air Flight 771 =

1983 fatal airliner bombing

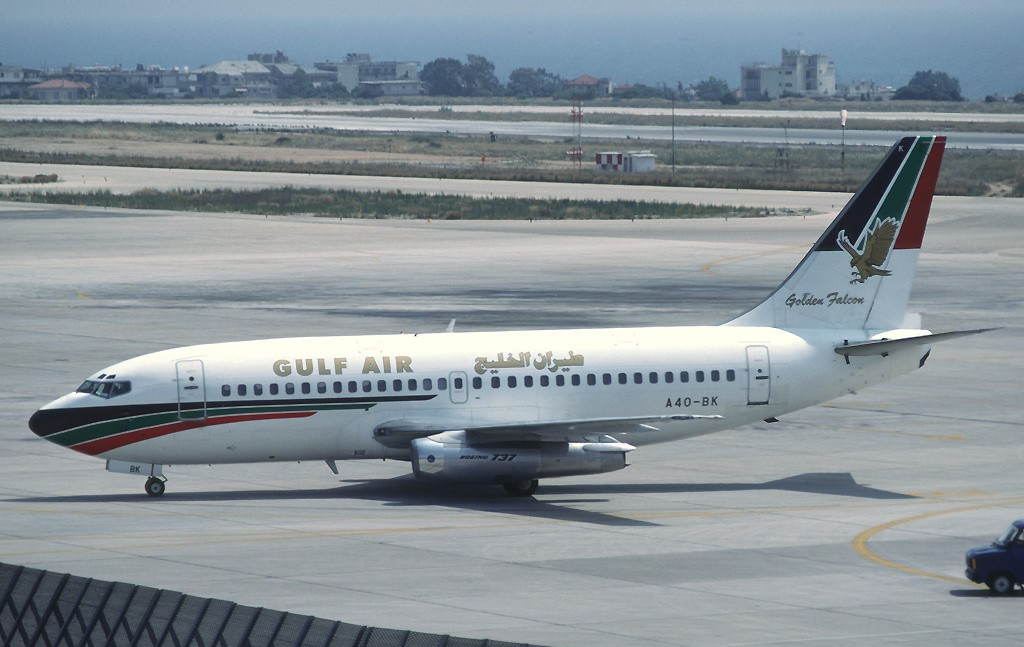
- A4O-BK, the aircraft involved in the bombing, pictured in July 1983

Bombing
- Date: 23 September 1983
- Summary: Terrorist bombing
- Site: Jebel Ali (northeast of Abu Dhabi International Airport), United Arab Emirates; 24.85°N 54.95°E

Aircraft
- Aircraft type: Boeing 737-2P6
- Operator: Gulf Air
- IATA flight No.: GF771
- ICAO flight No.: GFA771
- Call sign: GULF AIR 771
- Registration: A4O-BK
- Flight origin: Jinnah International Airport, Karachi, Pakistan
- 1st stopover: Abu Dhabi International Airport, United Arab Emirates
- Last stopover: Doha, Qatar
- Destination: Bahrain
- Occupants: 112
- Passengers: 105
- Crew: 7
- Fatalities: 112
- Survivors: 0

Gulf Air Flight 771 was an international scheduled passenger flight from Jinnah International Airport, Karachi, Pakistan, to Abu Dhabi International Airport, Abu Dhabi, United Arab Emirates. On 23 September 1983, while the Boeing 737-200 was on approach, a bomb, planted by the Iraqi-based Palestinian nationalist militant group, Abu Nidal Organization, exploded in the baggage compartment, resulting in a fire. The aircraft crashed in the desert near Jebel Ali between Abu Dhabi and Dubai. All 105 passengers and 7 crew members died. To date, it is the deadliest air disaster in the history of the United Arab Emirates, along with Sterling Airways Flight 296 in 1972 which also had 112 fatalities.

== Background ==
=== Aircraft ===
The aircraft involved, manufactured by Boeing in 1979, was a Boeing 737-2P6 registered as A4O-BK with serial number 21734 and line number 566. It was equipped with two Pratt & Whitney JT8D-15 engines.

=== Crew and passengers ===
The flight's cockpit crew consisted of the following:

- Omani Captain Saud al-Kindi
- Bahraini First Officer Khazal al-Qadi

The cabin crew were of mixed nationalities, ranging from British, Filipino, Indian, and Pakistani; the sole Bahraini member, Hashim Sayed Abdullah, acted as a deputy purser and worked in the economy class cabin. Two of the crew were from the United Kingdom; one of them, Sally Anne Townsend, 25, was a native of Peterborough, serving as chief purser on the flight as well as Linda Farthing, 27. Both had joined Gulf Air in 1978.

There were 96 Pakistani nationals, many returning to jobs in Abu Dhabi and Bahrain after spending the Eid al Adha holiday with their families in Pakistan. There were also 7 passengers from the United Kingdom, 1 from the United States, and 1 from Iran.

Nationality	Passengers	Crew	Total
Bahrain	0	2	2
India	0	1	1
Iran	1	0	1
Oman	0	1	1
Pakistan	96	1	97
Philippines	0	1	1
United Kingdom	5	2	7
United States	1	0	1
Total (8 Nationalities)	105	7	112

== Bombing ==
On 23 September 1983, while on approach to Abu Dhabi, the aircraft experienced an explosive detonation in the baggage compartment. The aircraft did not break up mid-air, but a fire broke out immediately afterwards and the passengers are believed to have died quickly from asphyxiation. As a result, the aircraft crashed into the desert near Jebel Ali, about 45 kilometres (28 mi) northeast of Abu Dhabi. All 112 people on board, including 7 crew members and 105 passengers, were killed in the bombing.

== Investigation ==
The report was revealed in September 1987 by British politician Sir Dudley Smith, under pressure from the parents of Lyn Farthing, one of the two British flight attendants who perished in the crash.

The report included a description of the last moments in the cockpit, including a description of Omani Captain Saoud Al Kindy praying as the plane nose-dived into the desert. The report mentioned that everything on board the flight was perfectly normal and voice transcripts showed the crew chatting among themselves. One asked the other if he was on duty the next day, to which he replied "No, I've got a day off tomorrow". That was followed by a sudden interruption and the recording showed the pilots making a frantic attempt to control the plane.

The report indicated a bomb in the baggage hold as the primary cause of the accident, due to the following factors:

- A passenger who checked baggage in Karachi never boarded the plane.
- The nature of injuries to passengers who were seated above the baggage hold.
- A sudden interruption to an otherwise normally operating flight.
- Data obtained from the aircraft's flight data recorder.

== Aftermath ==
The bomb was planted by the Abu Nidal Organization to persuade the United Arab Emirates to pay protection money to Abu Nidal so as to avoid attacks on their soil, which they promptly did. A final report on the crash was never released to the public.
