= Sterling Airways Flight 296 =

1972 aviation accident in Dubai

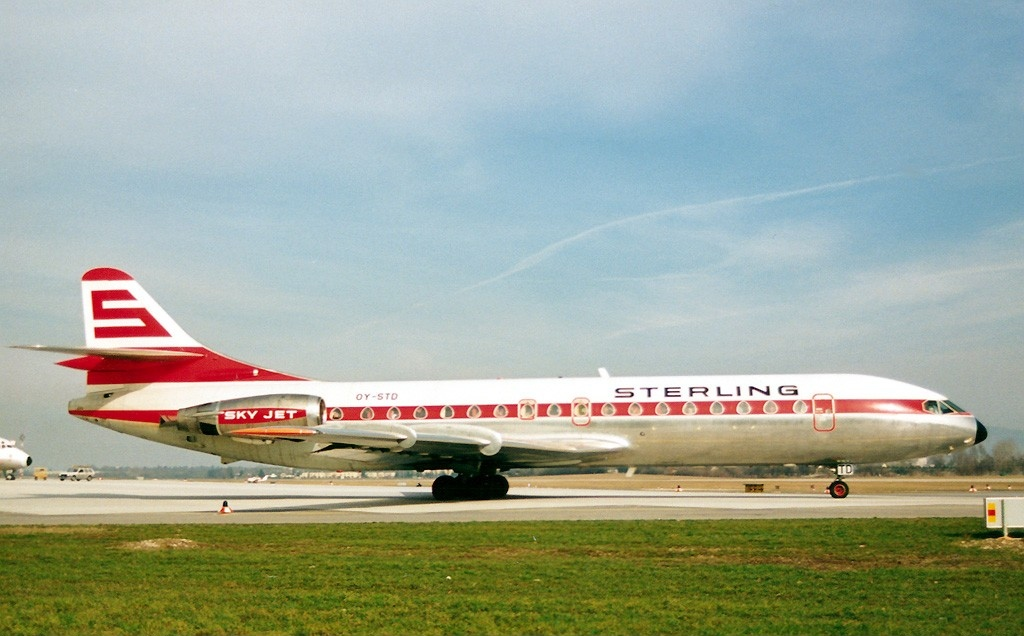
- A Sterling Airways Caravelle 10B3 similar to the accident aircraft

Occurrence
- Date: 14 March 1972
- Summary: Controlled flight into terrain, pilot error
- Site: Al Hayl, Fujairah, United Arab Emirates

Aircraft
- Aircraft type: Sud Aviation SE-210 Caravelle 10B3
- Operator: Sterling Airways
- Call sign: STERLING 296
- Registration: OY-STL
- Flight origin: Colombo International Airport, Colombo, Ceylon
- 1st stopover: Chhatrapati Shivaji International Airport, Bombay, India
- 2nd stopover: Dubai Airport, Dubai, United Arab Emirates
- Last stopover: Esenboğa International Airport, Ankara, Turkey
- Destination: Copenhagen Airport, Copenhagen, Denmark
- Occupants: 112
- Passengers: 106
- Crew: 6
- Fatalities: 112
- Survivors: 0

On 14 March 1972, Sterling Airways Flight 296 crashed into a mountain ridge on approach to Dubai in Al Hayl, Fujariah. Flight 296 was a charter flight from Colombo to Copenhagen with stops in Bombay, Dubai, and Ankara. All 112 passengers and crew on board died in the crash which was attributed to pilot error. The flight was operated by a Sud Aviation Caravelle, registration OY-STL. To date, it is the deadliest air disaster to involve a Caravelle and the deadliest air disaster in history in United Arab Emirates along with Gulf Air Flight 771 which also had 112 fatalities.

== Aircraft ==
The aircraft involved was Sud Aviation SE-210 Caravelle 10B3, powered by two Pratt & Whitney JT8D-9 engines, operated by Sterling Airways, with registration OY-STL. It had its first flight on 10 May 1970. The aircraft was in a long-haul flight configuration equipped with central fuel tanks. The passenger capacity of the cabin was 109 seats, though the maximum number of people on board was 116. The aircraft had 6,674 hours and 50 minutes flight time and 2,373 landings at the time of the accident. The last Y-l check (every 12–15 months) was performed by Finnair (under a contract) on 5 June 1971. The aircraft's last overhaul was performed on 8 February 1972, when the aircraft had 6,270 hours 39 minutes of flying time. The last A and B technical inspections were performed one day before the accident flight on 13 March 1972, before departure from Copenhagen. The last B-check was performed in Bombay the same day.

== Accident ==
Sterling Airways Flight 296 was chartered by the tour company Tjæreborg Rejser to take 106 Europeans home from vacations in Ceylon (present day Sri Lanka). The flight from Colombo to Copenhagen was scheduled to make refuelling stops in Bombay, Dubai, and Ankara. A change of crew was also scheduled during the stop in Ankara. Flight 296 departed from Colombo on time at 17:20 local time for Bombay.

The 106 passengers were from Denmark, Finland, Norway, Sweden, and West Germany. The Danish cockpit crew consisted of Captain Ole Jørgensen, 35, and First Officer Jørgen Pedersen, 30.

At 19:45, it landed in Bombay. The passengers were not allowed to de-plane during the stop in Bombay. After refuelling Flight 296 departed for Dubai at 21:20.

When 95 nmi (176 km; 109 mi) from Dubai, the crew requested descent. Air Traffic control cleared Flight 296 to descend to FL40 (4,000 feet (1,200 m)). The controler asked if they wanted a heading of 284, to which the crew agreed. Shortly before 22:00 local time, Flight 296 began the approach into Dubai.

The weather in Dubai was cloudy with scattered thunderstorms. Crews of other aircraft reported an overcast sky with large cumulus clouds over the coast. The crew of BOAC Flight 833 (also flying to Dubai, from Calcutta) indicated that the coast was poorly visible on weather radar due to thunderstorms.

At 21:50, the crew of Flight 296 reported descending to FL40 and asked which runway was in use. The controller stated the wind was 045/6 knots and runway 30 or 12 was available. The crew selected runway 30. At 21:56, the crew reported leaving FL135 and were instructed maintain 2,000 ft (610 m) on the Dubai Airport pressure of 1016 hPa, to maintain 2,000 feet until airport in sight. The crew acknowledged.

For better communication, the crew switched to the backup radio, since it was quiet, the radio communications on the cockpit voice recorder were poor or unusable. At 22:01, Flight 296 contacted the controller, but this was not recorded on the CVR. The controller also stated: "the ADF radio station antenna was reduced in length due to the runway extension, and 'DO' is not giving much power. Use the VOR on 115.7 MHz or the ILS localizer on 110.1 MHz"

Just after this transmission, the crew transmitted another message. At 22:02:04 the controller stated: "296, Dubai, you are fading away, say again please." At 22:02:12 he said, "296, Dubai, QNH Dubai 1016." Transmissions from flight 296 were not recorded by the CVR. At 22:03:15, the controller transmitted: "296, Dubai, report field in sight", but the controller believed Flight 296 did not hear his message. At 22:04, the crew radioed that the VOR was not working, to which the controller transmitted at 18:03:42: "296, Dubai, if the VOR indication are not reliable, select ILS on frequency 110.1. The QDM is 300°, this will align you with the runway."

Travelling at a speed of 195 kn (224 mph; 361 km/h), on a heading of 285° the aircraft descended at about 800 ft/min (4.1 m/s) and had already descended to 1,400 ft (430 m) when the crew saw the mountains ahead. Engine power was increased, and the aircraft began to climb at a vertical speed of 600–700 ft/min (3.0–3.6 m/s). Ten seconds later the aircraft's left wing hit a mountain ridge at an altitude of 1,600 ft (490 m), 50 nautical miles (93 km) from Dubai airport and 10 nautical miles (19 km) north of the longitudinal axis of runway 30 at a speed of 190 knots (220 mph; 350 km/h). On impact, the left wing broke off. The plane continued another 2,851 ft (869 m) before impacting below the top of the next ridge. The wreckage slid down the slope and ended up in five different valleys.

Local residents stated that it was raining at the time. Several residents of Kalba were digging a ditch around a hut to divert rainwater, when at 22:00 local time an aircraft flew over at low altitude. One of the residents stated that the aircraft flew so low that its navigation lights were clearly visible. An explosion was seen shortly after. The residents got into a Land Rover and tried to get to the crash site, but the vehicle was stuck in the mud. The residents of the nearby Al-Heilruen settlement heard the explosion but thought that it was thunder.

At 22:10, Air Traffic Control in Dubai informed Bahrain about the loss of communication with Flight 296. All attempts to contact the plane were unsuccessful. An emergency was declared at 22:40 and a search began. The next morning, the wreckage of the aircraft was discovered in the mountains of Sharjah, 50 nautical miles (93 km) from Dubai Airport and 12 nautical miles (22 km) west of Kalba at 25°04′06″N 56°13′48″E There were no survivors among the 106 passengers and 6 crew members.

== Cause ==
The investigation found that the pilots descended below the minimum prescribed altitude. This was due to incorrect information on the outdated flight plan and/or due to a misreading of the weather radar which led the pilots to believe they were closer to Dubai than they actually were.

== Nationalities of the passengers and crew ==
Nationality	Passengers	Crew	Total
Denmark	68	6	74
Sweden	20	-	20
Norway	12	-	12
Finland	4	-	4
West Germany	2	-	2
Total	106	6	112
