= Croatian Australians =

Australian citizens of Croatian ancestry

Total population
- 164,360 (2021)–250,000 (est.) (0.6% of the Australian population)

Regions with significant populations
- Perth, Melbourne, Sydney, Adelaide, Canberra, Geelong, Mareeba, Cairns

Languages
- Australian English, Croatian

Religion
- Predominantly Roman Catholicism

Related ethnic groups
- Croatian Americans; Croatian New Zealanders

Croatian Australians (Croatian: Hrvatski Australci), Australian Croats (Australski Hrvati) or Croats in Australia (Hrvati u Australiji) are Australians of Croatian ancestry. Croatia has been a source of migrants to Australia, particularly in the 1960s and 1970s.

== History ==
=== Prior to World War I ===
Croats were first encouraged to migrate to Australia during the gold rushes of the 1850s taking place in the British colonies of Victoria and New South Wales. Although migration was relatively small, Croatian travellers and sailors employed on merchant vessels played a significant role in spreading the news of the opportunities possible in Australia.

In an interesting occurrence in October 1875, sixteen Croatian sailors aboard the vessel Stefano, became shipwrecked on the Ningaloo Reef along the West Australian coast. Ten survived to reach the shore where the local Yinikutira people gave them food and water, and found their map of the coast among the shipwreck's debris. By January 1876, all but two had died from hunger or exposure. The two survivors, Baccich (aged 16) and Jurich (aged 19), became part of a Yinikutira clan and spent the following three months living with them around the North West Cape. They were rescued by a pearler looking for Aboriginal labour in April 1876 and, after a few months in Fremantle, they returned to Europe.

The Western Australian gold rushes in the 1890s started a significant migration of Croats (mainly from Dalmatia) to Australia and by the early part of the 20th century, there were around 2000 to 3000 people of Croatian origin in Australia, 80% of these residing in Western Australia.

Croats in Australia began to socially organize in 1910, when the Peasant Party (Seljačka stranka) was founded, which operated under the influence of the Radić brothers. Party published the newsletter Seljačke novosti ('Peasant News'), and ceased to exist in 1922. In Boulder-Kalgoorlie, Western Australia, the Croatian-Slavic Society (Hrvatsko-slavjansko društvo) was founded in 1912 .

=== World Wars and Interwar period ===
Around 100 Australian Croats fought for the Allies during World War I. However, during this war around 600 non-naturalised Croats were interned at the Holsworthy Internment Camp where 20 died and about 500 were later deported from Australia in 1919.

During World War II, the fascist dictator Benito Mussolini and Nazi dictator Adolf Hitler established the fascist puppet-state of the Independent State of Croatia. Croatian Australian representatives during this time deplored this development as a tragedy for the Croatian people and condemned the quisling Ante Pavelić as a traitor.

Tom Starcevich, a Croatian Australian born in Subiaco, Western Australia was a recipient of the Victoria Cross medal for bravery during World War II.

=== Post World War II ===
Croatian migration to Australia took on a different aspect after World War II due to unfavorable economic and political changes in Croatia. The number of Croatian emigrants in Australia increased significantly, and emigrants from the coastal and island areas continued to dominate.

From 1945 to 1952, Australia's post-war immigration scheme saw around 170,000 Eastern European displaced persons, including Croatians, given residency. Some of these Croatian migrants were associated with the defeated Ustaše regime. In the context of the White Australia policy, Cold War anti-communism, and the shortage of workers at the time, the Ustaše in Australia were allowed to dominate and influence the Croatian migrant community through the establishment cultural and sporting clubs around Australia that promoted Ustaše ideals. This influence continues with the far-right extremism among the Croatian Australians in the 21st century Croatian-Australian society.

During the 1960s and early 1970s, the Ustaše splinter groups in Australia led by people like Srećko Rover ran a campaign of bombings, intimidation and insurgency operations against pro-Yugoslav interests. Eventually, after a large bombing in Sydney injured many people, a crackdown on the Ustaše movement in the Croatian-Australia community occurred from late 1972. This was spearheaded by the Attorney-General, Lionel Murphy, who raided ASIO Headquarters and made public the files on the Croatian terrorist activities.

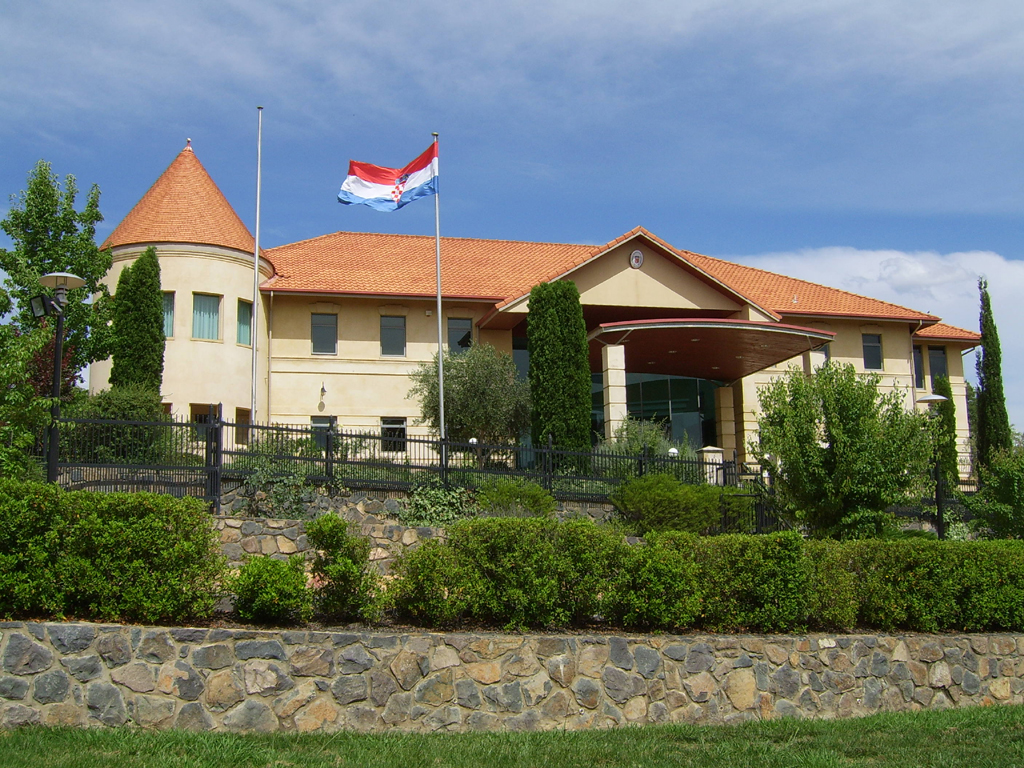
Croatian Embassy in Canberra

In November 1977, an unofficial Croatian embassy was opened in Canberra, causing a legal and diplomatic difficulty for both the Australian and Yugoslav governments. The embassy, aimed at raising awareness of Croatia as a nation and the Croatian people separate from Yugoslavia, remained open for 2 years closing in 1979. Its ambassador was Mario Despoja, the father of former Democrats leader Natasha Stott Despoja.

Since the independence of Croatia in the 1990s, an official embassy has been opened in Canberra and consulates have been opened in Melbourne, Sydney and Perth. Since 1991, the number of Croatians who have immigrated to Australia has been 30,000 and has been steadily declining since the beginning of 2000.

== Demographics ==
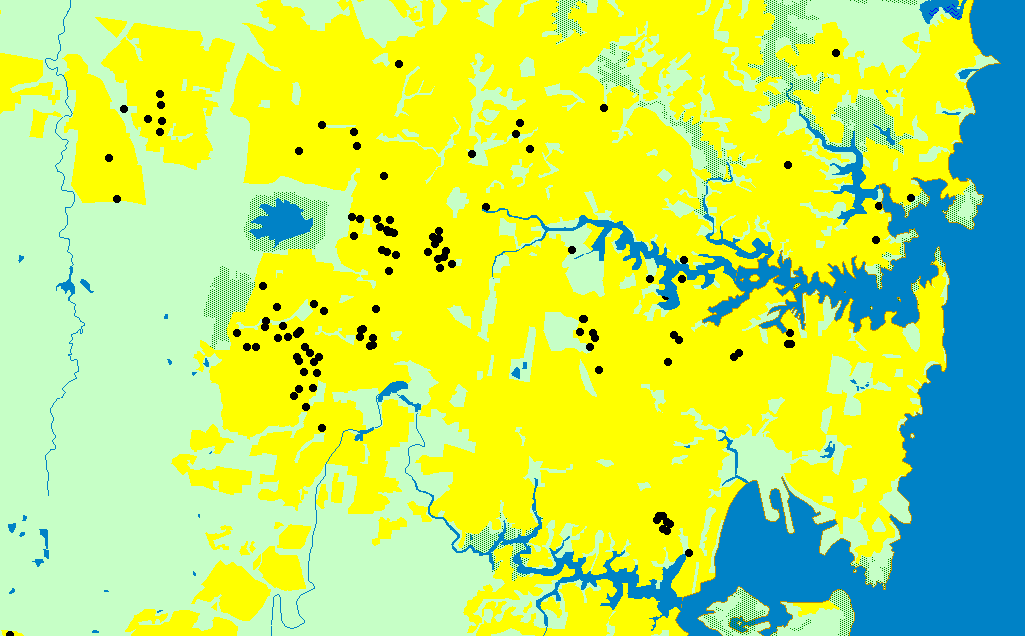
one dot denotes 100 Croatian-born Sydney residents

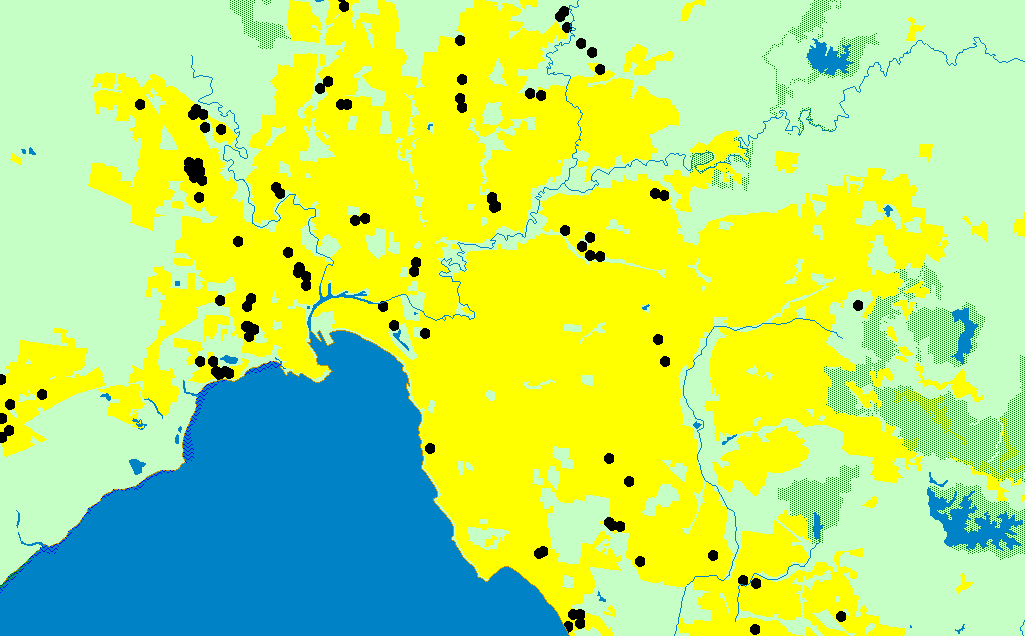
one dot denotes 100 Croatian-born Melbourne residents

As the level of immigration from Croatia has dropped significantly from the 1980s, the Croatian-born population is ageing.

Croatian Australians historically have an exceptionally low rate of return migration to Croatia. In December 2001, the Department of Foreign Affairs estimated that there were 1,000 Australian citizens resident in Croatia, mainly in Zagreb.

=== Religion ===
Croatian Australian demography by religion (note that it includes only Croatian born in Croatia and not australian with a Croatian background)
Religious group	2021 (Note: Religious breakdown proportions based on "Croatian" ethnic or cultural origin response on the 2021 census.)		2016 (Note: Religious breakdown proportions based on "Croatian" ethnic or cultural origin response on the 2016 census.)		2011 (Note: Religious breakdown proportions based on "Croatian" ethnic or cultural origin response on the 2011 census.)	
Religious group	Pop.	%	Pop.	%	Pop.	%
Catholic	31,086 ▼	71.79% ▼	31,925 ▼	73.09% ▼	36,530	74.81%
Eastern Orthodox	4,366 ▲	10.08% ▲	4,211 ▼	9.64% ▼	7,075	14.49%
Protestantism	2,335 ▼	5.39% ▼	2,574 ▼	5.88% ▲	2,622	5.37%
Other Christian denomination	1,685 ▼	3.89% ▼	1,949 ▲	4.46% ▲	367	0.75%
(Total Christian)	39,472▼	91.16% ▼	40,659▼	93.08%▼	46,594	95.42%
Irreligion	3,830 ▲	8.84% ▲	3,022 ▲	6.92% ▲	2,234	4.58%
Total English Australian population	43,302 ▼	100%	43,681 ▼	100%	48,828	100%

=== 2001 Census ===
In 2001, there were 51,909 Croatians born in Croatia living in Australia. Of this number, 52.3% were men and 47.7% were women. The largest number of Australians of Croatian origin lived in the New South Wales (35.5%), followed by Victoria (34.0%) and Western Australia (12.2%). 80.7% had both parents born outside Australia, only 6.7% had both parents born in Australia, while the remainder had one parent born in Australia and one parent born outside.

=== 2011 Census ===
People of Croatian ancestry according to the 2011 census results

According to 2011 census, there were 126,264 Croatians (0.6% of Australian population).

=== 2021 Census ===
The 2021 Census data released by the Australian Bureau of Statistics showed that 43,302 persons resident in Australia identified themselves as having been born in Croatia, representing about 0.15% of the Australian population. The Census also noted 164,362 persons identified themselves as having Croatian ancestry, either alone or in combination with another ancestry, representing a further 0.65% of the Australian population. Most of this demographic were shown to reside in Victoria and New South Wales.

57% of the Croatian-born population was aged 65 years or older at the time of the 2021 Census. The 2021 data also revealed that 15% of Croatian born Australians spoke only Croatian at home, while 24% spoke only English at home, and 72% of Croatian born Australians recorded their religion as Catholic.

== Croatian Australians and sport ==
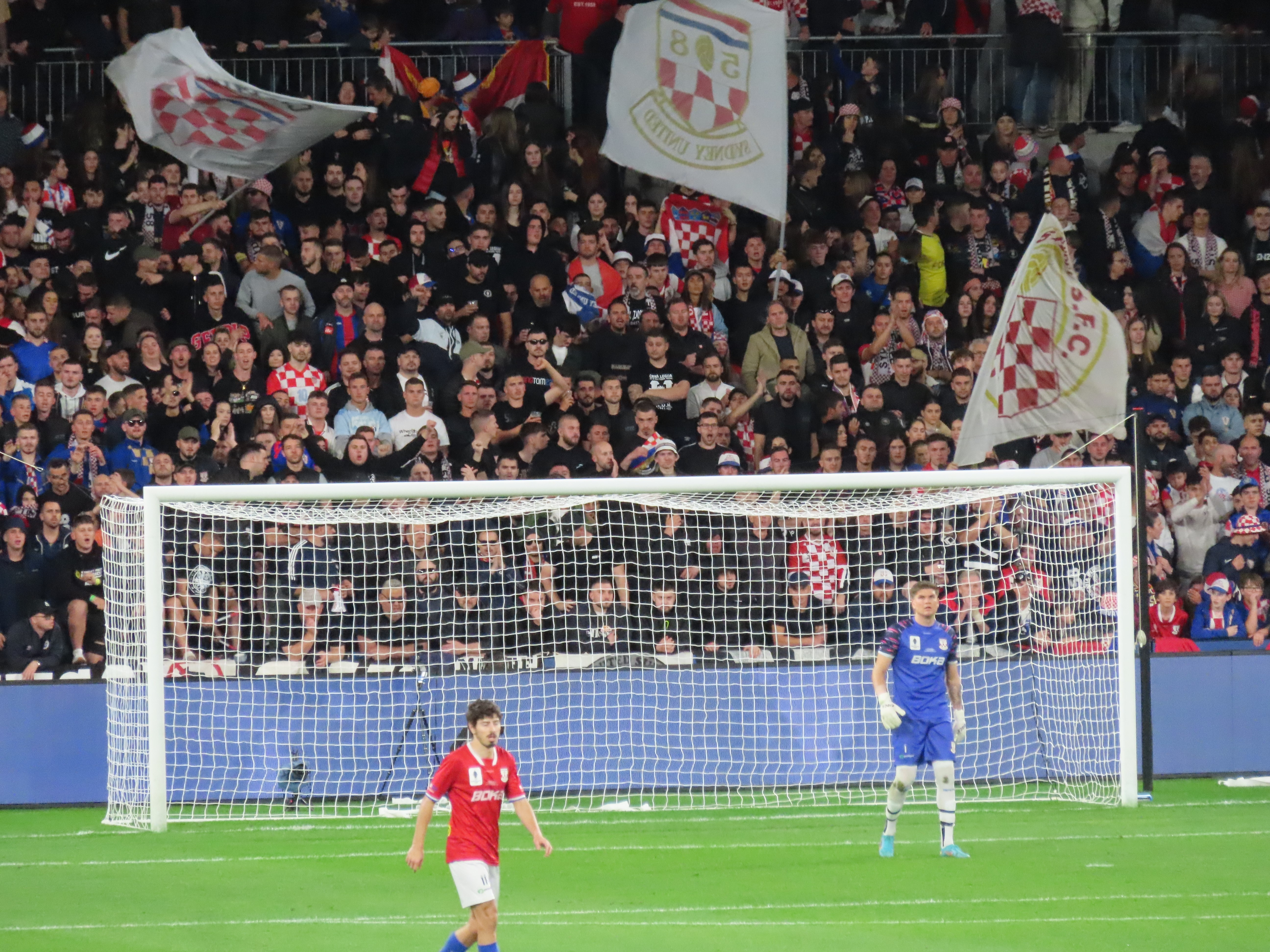
Fans of Sydney United 58 FC, a football club founded by Croatian Australians, at the 2022 Australia Cup Final

Australia has had numerous notable athletes of Croatian heritage, but Croatian Australians are mainly found in soccer, with numerous clubs established by local Croatian communities throughout the country, the most notable and successful being Sydney Croatia and Melbourne Croatia. These clubs nurtured the soccer talents of a large number of Croatian Australians, many of whom now play professionally overseas. Croatian Australians have played for both Croatia and Australia. In the 2006 World Cup, there were seven Croatian Australians playing for Australia and three playing for Croatia. A total of 47 Croatian Australians have gone on to play for the Australian national soccer team, including 7 who captained the national team. The Australian-Croatian Soccer Tournament is the oldest running soccer competition in Australia. Notable 21st century Australian athletes to have Croatian heritage include Simon Katich, Nathan Cleary, Noah Balta, and Nicola Olyslagers.

=== Croatian Australian Socceroos ===
- Zlatko Arambasic
- Mark Babic
- Zeljko Babic
- Yakka Banovic
- Paul Bilokapic
- Mark Bosnich
- Mark Bresciano
- Branko Buljevic
- Ante Covic
- Jason Culina (C)
- Ivan Franjic
- Eugene Galekovic
- Steve Horvat (C)
- Mile Jedinak (C)
- Ante Juric
- Frank Juric
- Tomi Juric
- Matthew Jurman
- Zeljko Kalac (C)
- Fran Karačić
- Steve Kokoska
- Eddie Krncevic (C)
- Tony Krlsovic
- Andrew Marth
- Frank Micic
- Nicolas Milanovic
- Ljubo Milicevic
- Ante Milicic
- Branko Milosevic
- Ante Moric
- Jason Petkovic
- Michael Petkovic
- Tom Pondeljak
- Tony Popovic
- Ivo Prskalo
- Wally Savor
- Josip Skoko (C)
- Matthew Spiranovic
- Mark Talajic
- Dario Vidosic
- Mark Viduka (C)
- Billy Vojtek
- Robert Zabica
- Ruben Zadkovich
- David Zdrilic
- Ned Zelic

=== Croatian Australian Matildas ===
- Emily Gielnik

=== Croatian Australians in Croatian national team ===
- Anthony Šerić
- Josip Šimunić
- Joey Didulica
- Anthony Pavlešić

=== Notable Croatian Australians to represent Australia in other Sports ===
- Nathan Cleary - Rugby League
- Simon Katich - Cricket
- Max Krilich - Rugby League (C)
- Nicola Olyslagers - High Jumping
- Andrew Vlahov - Basketball
- Steve Erceg - UFC fighter
- Andrew Bogut, former NBA player
- Natasha Chokljat, Netball

== Culture ==
=== Folklore ===
Croatian Folkloric Arts Festival is held in Adelaide New South Wales Folklore Society Association in Sydney gathers and coordinates Croatian groups in the NSW area.

Some of the groups include:

- Croatian folklore group "Zagreb", Perth
- Folklore ensemble "Vukovar", Sydney (since 1984)
- Mladi Frankopani ('Young Frankopans'), Sydney
- HSF Croatia, Canberra
- Mladi Hrvati ('Young Croats'), Melbourne
- Hrvatska Zora ('Croatian Dawn'), Melbourne
- Hrvatsko folklorno društvo ('Croatian Folklore Association'), Melbourne
- HKUD Lado, Geelong
- Hrvatska folklorna skupina Lenek ('Croatian Folklore Group Lenek'), Adelaide
- KUD Hrvatski Pleter ('Croatian interlace'), Adelaide

=== Events ===
- Croats in Australia from the Sali on Dugi Otok island organised themselves into "Sons of Sali" (S.O.S.) and "Sisters of Sali". They organise the Annual Sons of Sali Picnic and Bocce competition, as well as SOS Karte nights.

=== Clubs ===
Australia is home to numerous Croatian clubs and societies. Most of them are located in Sydney, Melbourne, Perth, and Canberra, in premises owned and built by the Croatian community.

== Language and education ==
Since 1975, the state-owned station SBS has been broadcasting programs in the Croatian language, and in 1989, Croatian language teaching began as an elective subject in secondary schools.

Australian Croats have organized Croatian language classes in Croatian Catholic centers and Sunday schools since the 1970s. Croatian language classes are offered in the regular school system, and the Croatian Ministry of Education supports classes with textbooks and other teaching aids. The first chair of Croatian studies was established in 1983 at Macquarie University in Sydney. Since 1998, the same university has also opened a Center for Croatian Language Studies. In February 2008, the Center for Croatian Studies in the World was opened at Macquarie University, as a joint project with the University of Split.

- The Association of Croatian Language Teachers in Victoria, established in the 1970s, helped in developing Croatian language programs for primary and secondary schools in Victoria.
- Australian Croatian Community Services (ACCS), based in Footscray, provides Croatian language courses
- Croatian Language Center, teaching Croatian as a foreign language
- Croatian Studies Centre (CSC) within the School of Modern Languages at Sydney's Macquarie University, established in 1994.

Croatian is also learnt in Croatian schools and some language schools, such as in New South Wales. Croatian is an optional (elective) subject at the graduation exam.

Some of the Croatian schools in the NSW include:

- Braća Radić School in Schofields
- Dr. Ante Starčević School in Beverly Hills
- Croatian School in Blacktown
- Croatian School in Summer Hill

== Media ==
=== Broadcasting ===
There are Croatian language programs at the SBS since 1975. First associates of the SBS's Croatian language program were Ivana Bačić Serdarević and Vesna Lušić. Among the radios, there are Croatian Radio Australia in Sydney and 3ZZ in Melbourne, Croatian Program World Radio and Radio Fremantle – Croatian Program. Independent channel 31 broadcasts a weekly television show for the Croatian community. Satellite programs of the Croatian Radio Television and international programs of Croatian Radio (24 hours) can also be followed throughout Australia.

=== Periodicals ===
- Croatian Herald, newspaper in Victoria
- Caritas Croatia, monthly bulletin of "Croatian Caritas Australia"

=== Film ===
- Unspoken, short film

== Charities ==
The most prominent humanitarian organizations include:

- Australian-Croatian Community Services (Australsko-hrvatske društvene usluge), Melbourne, a non-profit organization that provides assistance to the elderly and disabled
- Adria Retirement Village, a retirement home and care facility
- Adria Village Limited, founded in 1989 by the voluntary work of members of the Croatian community in Canberra, officially opened in 1994
- Cardinal Stepinac Village, a retirement home and care facility
- Croatian Caritas Australia

== Economy ==
=== Wines ===
Among prominent vineyards and wineries established and held by Croatian descendants in Australia are Talijancich Wines, Katgully Wines, Windy Creek Estate, John Kosovich Wines etc.

== List of notable Croatian Australians ==
=== Entertainment and the arts ===
- Steve Abbott – comedian, The Sandman, Russian/Croatian mother
- Eric Bana – actor (Croatian father)
- Charles Billich – artist
- Nathaniel Buzolic – actor
- Drago Marin Cherina – sculptor
- Ante Dabro – sculptor
- Silvana Gardner – poet and visual artist
- Robert Jozinović – actor
- Robert Luketić – film director
- Tatjana Lukić – poetry editor and poet
- Ivan Sen – film director – Croatian father, Aboriginal mother
- Marisa Siketa – actress
- Mark Strizic – Photographer and painter.
- Emma Viskic – author – Croatian father, Irish Australian mother.

=== Music ===
- Alison Wonderland – electronic dance music producer, DJ and singer.
- Philip Bračanin – composer and musicologist.
- Steve Pavlovic – music entrepreneur
- Roddy Radalj – musician, founding member of the Hoodoo Gurus, the Dubrovniks and Roddy Ray'Da & the Surfin' Caesars.
- Natalie D-Napoleon – (Croatian father and mother) – Australian singer-songwriter and poet.
- Simone Young – (Croatian mother) – Australian conductor
- The Kid Laroi - (Mom's Ancestry) Australian Singer

=== Academia ===
- David Andrich – academic

=== Science and medicine ===
- Brice Bosnich – chemist
- Ivan Marusic – physicist
- Vlado Perkovic – physician
- Ralph Sarich – Inventor of the revolutionary Orbital Engine, and at one stage, in the 1970s, Australia's richest person.
- Frances Separovic- biophysical chemist
- Hrvoje Tkalčić – geophysicist

=== Business and work ===
- Katarina Carroll (nee Bošnjak) – first female Police Commissioner, for the State of Queensland
- Juli Grbac, fashion designer who was the first winner of Project Runway Australia.
- Tony Šantić – Millionaire tuna fisherman, horse breeder and owner of Makybe Diva
- Zeljko Ranogajec – businessman and professional gambler.
- John Setka – Australian Trade Union leader

=== Media ===
- Charmaine Dragun – journalist
- Laura Dundovic – Top 10 finalist of Miss Universe 2008
- friendlyjordies – Jordan Shanks-Markovina; independent journalist, stand-up comedian and former model
- George Grljusich – sports journalist
- Sarah Harris – journalist
- Andrew O'Keefe – TV personality (Croatian mother)
- Amos Gill – Comedian, Radio and TV Presenter
- Silvio Rivier – Television presenter (born in Croatia, migrated to Australia in 1961).

=== Politics ===
- Danica Baričević – politician (Croatian Democratic Union), born in Myrtleford, Victoria
- Mick Nanovich – politician (Liberal Party), Western Australia
- Maria Kovacic - politician, senator (Liberal Party), NSW
- Tony Krsticevic – politician (Liberal Party), Western Australia
- John Newman – Born John Naumenko, politician (Labor Party) NSW.
- Jaye Radisich – politician (Labor Party), Western Australia
- Ljiljanna Ravlich – politician (Labor Party), Western Australia
- Zed Seselja – politician, senator (Liberal Party), ACT
- Natasha Stott Despoja – federal politician, senator (Australian Democrats) – South Australia

=== Other ===
- Matthew Beovich – Roman Catholic priest, Archbishop of Adelaide.
- Blaž Kraljević – Croatian and Bosnian general
- Roman Krznaric – social philosopher. His great grandfather was croatian.
- Ivan Milat – notorious serial killer (Croatian father)
- Vincent Serventy – a noted Australian author, ornithologist and conservationist.
- Tom Starcevich – World War 2 Victoria Cross recipient
- Frank Vitkovic – notorious mass murderer and perpetrator of the Queen Street Massacre (Croatian father)

=== Sport ===
- Jason Akermanis – His father, Denis Dezdjek, is Croatian.
- Noah Balta – Australian rules footballer
- Adrian Barich – Australian rules and rugby league footballer
- Andrew Barisic – football (soccer) player, Kingfisher East Bengal
- Andrew Bogut – basketball player, Sydney Kings; formerly with several NBA teams
- Mark Bosnich – former football (soccer) player, Australia, now soccer TV analyst
- Oliver Bozanic - former football (soccer) player
- Mark Bresciano – football (soccer) player, Al Nasr and Australia (Croatian mother)
- Ivan Cleary – Rugby league coach and former player
- Nathan Cleary – Rugby league player
- Ante Čović – footballer (soccer) player, Elfsborg and Australia
- Jason Čulina- football (soccer) player, Gold Coast United and Australia
- Alan Didak – Australian rules footballer
- Joey Didulica – former Croatian footballer
- Bronko Djura – former rugby league footballer and cricketer
- Jelena Dokic – tennis player (Croatian mother)
- John Dorotich – Australian rules footballer
- Anthony Drmic – basketball player, Adelaide 36ers
- Frank Drmic – basketball player, last played for South Dragons
- Mate Dugandzic – football (soccer) player, Adelaide United FC
- Gordon Fode – Australian rules footballer
- Ray Gabelich – Australian rules footballer
- Eugene Galekovic – football (soccer) player and Socceroo
- Darren Gaspar – Australian rules footballer
- John Gerovich – Australian rules footballer
- Antony Golec – football (soccer) player, Central Coast Mariners, formerly Sydney FC, Sydney United and Adelaide United
- Brent Grgić – Australian rules footballer
- Ivan Henjak – former Rugby league footballer and coach
- Matt Henjak – Rugby union player, Toulon and formerly Australia (nephew of Ivan)
- Allen Jakovich – Australian rules footballer
- Glen Jakovich – Australian rules footballer
- Vedran Janjetović – football (soccer) player
- Mile Jedinak – footballer (soccer), Aston Villa and Australia.
- Wayne Johnston – Australian rules footballer
- Tomi Juric – footballer (soccer) and Socceroo
- Željko Kalac- former football (soccer) player, Kavala and Australia, now soccer TV analyst
- Anthony Kalik – footballer
- Simon Katich – Australian Cricket representative
- Max Krilich – Australian rugby league footballer who played in the 1970s and 1980s
- Anthony Leban – Australian footballer
- Dean Lukin – Olympic weight lifting gold medallist
- Ivan Maric – Australian rules footballer
- Marinko Matosevic – Tennis player
- Brody Mihocek – Australian rules footballer
- Jack Mihocek – Australian rules footballer
- Ante Milicic – former football (soccer) player, Rijeka and Australia
- Tomislav Mrčela – Australian footballer, NK Lokomotiva and Australia
- Nicola Olyslagers – Australian high jumper
- Len Pascoe – Australian Cricket representative
- Matthew Pavlich – Australian rules footballer
- Anthony Perosh – mixed martial arts fighter
- Val Perovic - Australian rules footballer
- Oscar Piastri - F1 driver
- Tony Popović – former football (soccer) player and current manager
- Jack Rocchi – Australian rules footballer
- Steven Salopek – Australian rules footballer
- Anthony Šerić – football (soccer) player, Hajduk Split and Croatia
- Josip Šimunić – former football (soccer) player, Hoffenheim and Croatia
- Elvis Sinosic – mixed martial arts fighter
- Josip Skoko – former football (soccer) player, Hajduk Split and Australia
- Ivan Soldo – Australian rules footballer
- Brandon Starcevich – Australian rules footballer
- Craig Starcevich – Australian rules footballer
- Peter Sumich – Australian rules footballer
- Erik Surjan – decathlete
- Jacob Surjan – Australian rules footballer
- Ajla Tomljanović – tennis player
- Bernard Tomić – tennis player
- Steven Ugarković – football player
- Mark Viduka – former football (soccer) player for numerous club teams and Australia
- Dennis Yagmich – cricket
- David Zdrilić – football (soccer) player, now soccer TV analyst
- Ned Zelic – former football (soccer) player for numerous club teams and Australia, now soccer TV analyst
- Noah Botić – football (soccer) player
- Andrew Vlahov – basketball and four-time Olympian

== See also ==
- Australia–Croatia relations
- Ustaše in Australia
- Croatian New Zealanders
- European Australians
- Europeans in Oceania
- Immigration to Australia
- List of Croatian soccer clubs in Australia
- List of Croats
- Croatian Canadians
- Croatian Americans
