= Far-right extremism among the Croatian Australians =

The continued strong infiltration of the ideology of the Ustaše in Australia into the Croatian-Australian community assisted the creation of neo-Ustaše para-military units which were actively utilised in the breakup of Yugoslavia during Croatian War of Independence of the early 1990s. These units were involved in mass killings of civilians during that conflict.

Even with the achievement of Croatian independence in 1991, far-right Ustaše ideology has been able to persist as a significant part of Croatian-Australian public society well into the 21st Century. Portraits of the Nazi puppet Ustaše leader Ante Pavelić, known as the Poglavnik, continue to be displayed and the Ustaše slogan "Za dom spremni" continues to be chanted with fascist salutes at social and sporting clubs and events in Australia.

== Background ==
The Ustaše (pronounced [ûstaʃe]) (singular: Ustaša) were formed in 1929 as a fascist Croatian ultranationalist group led by Ante Pavelić. The ideology of the movement was a blend of fascism, terrorism and Croatian ultranationalism which called for the creation of a racially "pure" Croatian state and promoted genocide against Serbs, Jews and Roma.

Following the end of the World War II in Yugoslavia, Australia became the destination for some of the escaped Ustaše members. The anti-communist zeal of the naturalised Ustaše immigrants aligned neatly with the political stance of both the ruling Liberal Party government under Robert Menzies, and ASIO under Charles Spry. This gave the Ustaše a significant degree of freedom and protection to organise major national and international terrorist activities on Australian soil. From 1969 to 1973, the operations of the Ustaše increased dramatically both in their number and in their violence, including notably the Bugojno group and the Sydney Yugoslav General Trade and Tourist Agency bombing. In 1972, there were several major Ustaše activities which resulted in the Australian authorities finally taking a stand against the terrorist attacks.

In late 1972, the Whitlam government came to power in Australia and immediately a large number of raids were conducted on known Ustaše organisers and sympathisers. The pressure was continued under the Fraser government where 19 HRB members led by Jure Marić were arrested at an Ustaše paramilitary training camp at Mount Imlay in NSW in 1978. Several members were jailed with Marić receiving a four-year sentence under the newly introduced Foreign Incursion and Recruitment section of the Commonwealth Crimes Act. In 1981, another trial of six Croatian-Australians occurred. These men, members of a new group called the Croatian Republican Party (HRS), were arrested and convicted of crimes including attempting to bomb Sydney's water supply, destroy Yugoslav travel agencies and murder Lovoković whom they viewed as a traitor to the Ustaše movement. They were betrayed by a probable Yugoslav double agent and each sentenced to 15 years in prison. The men all spent 10 years in prison, and were released in 1991.

== Role in the Croatian War of Independence ==
The collapse of the Socialist Federal Republic of Yugoslavia in the early 1990s gave hope to many Croatian-Australians that a truly independent Croatian nation would be formed. It also gave the organisational ability of Ustaše ideologues in Australian society much increased impetus. Significant funding was raised by people such as Stjepan Kardum the leader of the Sydney Branch of the neo-Ustaše group called the Croatian Party of Rights (HSP). This money was funnelled into the formation of the HSP's ultra-nationalistic paramilitary units called the Croatian Defence Forces (Hrvatske obrambene snage or HOS) that fought in the Croatian War of Independence. These units operated separate from the control of the regular Armed Forces of Croatia and were involved in pillage, rape and mass killings of civilians at places like the Dretelj prison camp in southern Bosnia.

Flag of the HOS

The HSP and HOS saw themselves as a continuation of the Ustaša regime and desired the recreation of a Greater Croatia based upon the borders of the Nazi puppet-state of the NDH which included all of Bosnia to the west of the Drina River. Members of HOS openly labelled themselves as Ustaše, their black uniforms and insignia emulated the Crna Legija and their marching anthem glorified the NDH, the Poglavnik and other Ustaša leaders such as Jure Francetić and Rafael Boban. Their slogan was the Ustaša salute Za dom spremni and even their name was derived from the military units of the NDH, the Hrvatske oružane snage.

It is estimated that up to 200 Croatian-Australians fought in the HOS paramilitary units. The HOS forces in the Bosnian region were led by Croatian-Australian Blaž Kraljević who was previously a member of the HRB and other ultra-nationalist groups in Australia. Kraljević was given the rank of major general and carried out systematic ethnic cleansing operations during the war. The HOS and their goal of establishing an Ustaša state were considered dangerous to the aims and the stability of the newly created modern Croatia to the point where Kraljević was assassinated by Croatian forces in 1992 and the HOS were soon after forcibly disbanded. Croatian-Australians also fought under Željko Glasnović and compared their unit with the 369th Ustaše Division who fought alongside the Nazis in the Battle of Stalingrad.

== Neo-Ustaše in 21st century Australian society ==
Within the modern state of Croatia (a progressive nation that has joined the Schengen Area and adopted the Euro currency), the neo-Ustaša have been consigned to the far-right fringe. Their main political groups, the Croatian Party of Rights and the Domovinski Pokret are unpopular in Croatia. These and other Neo-Ustaša elements such as the HOS veterans groups are condemned in the Croatian media for the hateful violence they inspire, such as the 2020 Zagreb shooting.

Conversely, in Australia, Croatian social and sporting clubs continue to display busts and portraits of Ante Pavelić, Ustaše flags are flown proudly and support for HOS is also widely expressed. Zoran Milanović, the first prime minister of an independent Croatia ever to come to Australia, was shunned by much of the Australian Croatian community on a visit in 2014 due to his anti-fascist policies such as making the Za dom spremni chant illegal.

The 10 April 1941 anniversary of the establishment of the Nazi puppet state of the NDH is also publicly celebrated in many Australian Croatian clubs. Known as the Deseti Travanj, this ceremony often occurred with the involvement of members of the Liberal Party of Australia. Recent high-ranking Liberal Party identities such as Helen Coonan, Concetta Fierravanti-Wells and Craig Kelly have continued the Liberal Party tradition of helping the Ustaše celebrate 10 April that has seen past members such as William McMahon, David Clarke, Bill Wentworth, Eric Willis and Peter Coleman also partaking in ceremonies glorifying Ante Pavelić. The more recent episode involving Craig Kelly resulted in a diplomatic rift with the Croatian embassy, which condemned the celebration of the anniversary of the Nazi puppet state.

=== Involvement in football ===
Many current Croatian-Australian football (soccer) clubs have strong links to the Ustaše. For example, Melbourne Croatia was founded during deseti travanj in 1953 with the involvement of the Ustaše officer Srećko Rover who was involved in mass killings in the NDH and was a leader of the HNO in Australia. Another example is Canberra Croatia FC, which for a number of years took the name Soccer Club HOPE, a title that was chosen to reflect the club's connection to the Croatian Liberation Movement (HOP). Croatian-Australian football clubs in the modern age overtly continue to display Ustaše symbolism and use Ustaše flags. For instance, the Gold Coast Knights F.C. celebrated their victory over fellow Croatian-Australian club the Brisbane Knights FC in the 2022 Mesić Cup by having their players pose around the Ustaša flag.

The main logo for HNK Edensor Park football club is a map of Greater Croatia, which is a Croatian state advocated by the right-wing ultra-nationalist Dobroslav Paraga, the borders of which are extensions of those of the NDH. Attempts to create a Greater Croatia during the Croat-Bosniak War of the early 1990s led the International Criminal Tribunal for the former Yugoslavia to call it a joint criminal enterprise aimed at the ethnic cleansing of Bosnia and Herzegovina.

In 2013, Croatian-Australian footballer Josip Šimunić was given a 10 match ban by FIFA and blocked from competing in the World Cup for leading the fascist Za dom spremni chant with Croatian football fans after a qualifying game. Šimunić was also fined by Croatian legal authorities. Canberra Croatia FC president Marko Vrkić made the claim that Šimunić didn't intend to cause offense when using the chant, comparing it to "Australians using, Aussie, Aussie, Aussie, Oi, Oi, Oi". However, the very same chant is used by the Ustaša as their call-sign, making it synonymous with the genocidal Pavelić regime. Šimunić was later appointed to assistant national coach and head youth coach for the Croatia national football team, where he has been accused of creating a culture where Ustaše ideology is normalised.

=== 2022 Australia Cup Final controversy ===
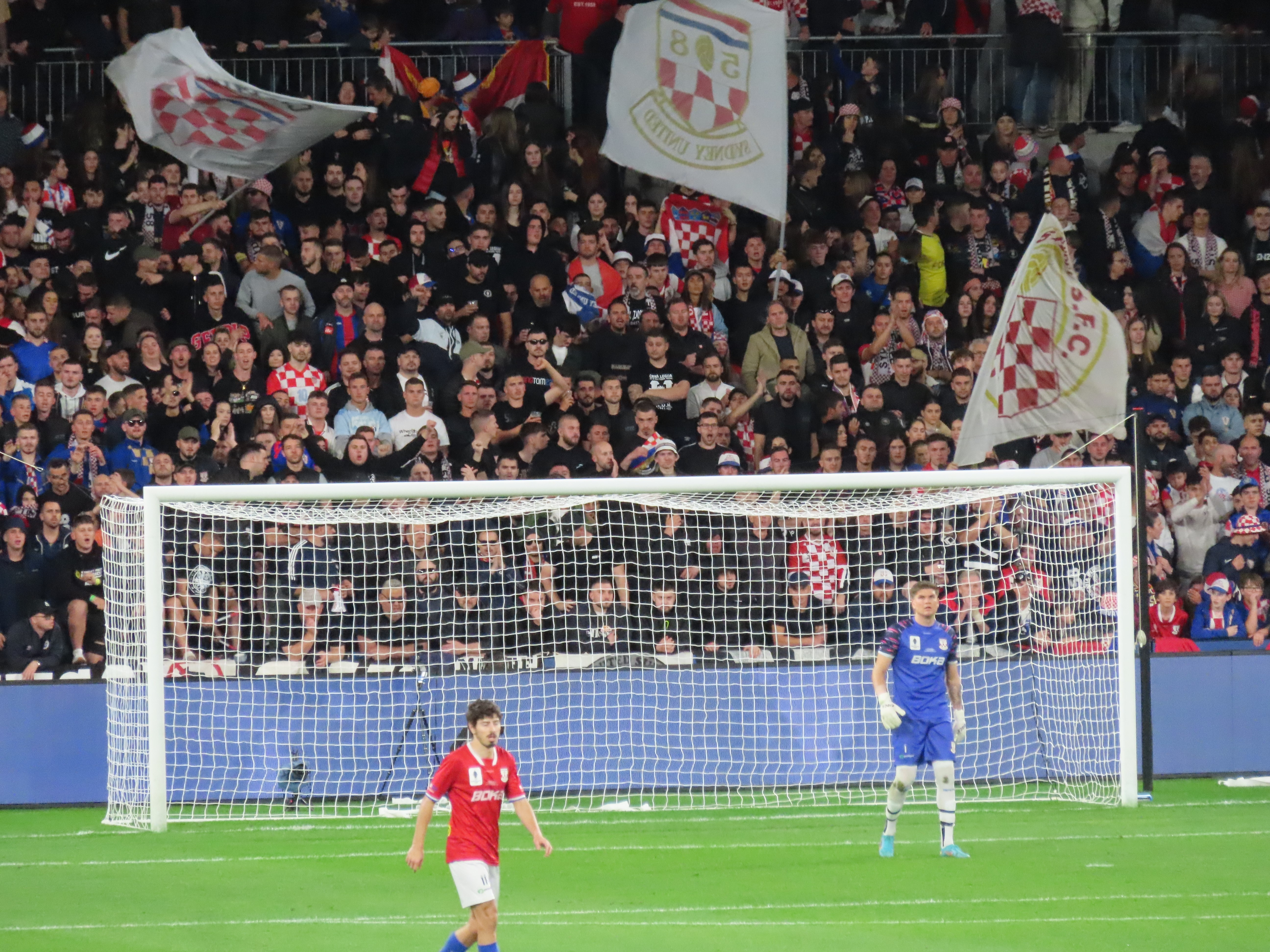
Sydney United 58 FC fans at the 2022 Australia Cup Final

During the 2022 Australia Cup Final that featured Sydney United 58 FC, the main Croatian-Australian team in NSW, footage showed hundreds of Sydney United fans participating in the Ustaša Za dom spremni chant while giving fascist salutes. Many Ustaše and HOS flags were proudly displayed.

In June 2024, three Sydney United fans were convicted and fined $500 in a NSW court for deliberately and intentionally performing the Nazi salute at the 2022 Australia Cup Final. In November 2024, convictions for two of the three Sydney United fans were overturned on appeal.
