= Ustaše in Australia =

Croatian ultranationalist movement in Australia

- Local leaders: Fabijan Lovoković; Srećko Rover; Jure Marić; Ljubomir Vuina; Geza Pašti; Josip Senić; Rocque Romac; Tomislav Lesić; Ivica Kokić; Blaž Kraljević; Nikola Štedul; Stjepan Kardum
- Founded: ~1950
- Branches: Croatian Liberation Movement (HOP); Croatian National Resistance (HNO); Croatian Revolutionary Brotherhood (HRB)
- Ideology: Croatian irredentism Croatian ultranationalism Corporate statism Anti-Serb sentiment
- Political position: Far-right
- Religion: Roman Catholicism
- Colours: Red White Blue Black
- Slogan: "Za dom spremni" ("For the Homeland-Ready!")

Flags utilised (Note: An iteration of the Croatian checkerboard with the first square colored white (instead of red), despite having historicity, has been strongly associated with the Croatian fascist and Ustaša ideology since the Second World War and flags depicting it as such are banned in Austria.)

At the end of World War II in 1945, members of the fascist Croatian ultranationalist and genocidal Ustaše regime from the collapsed Nazi puppet state of the Independent State of Croatia (NDH) fled from the Balkan region to avoid imprisonment and execution at the hands of the Yugoslav Partisans. With the help of Western authorities, who now viewed the fiercely anti-communist stance of the Ustaše favourably in the emerging Cold War, thousands of members of the regime were allowed to migrate to other countries, including Australia.

Despite the post-war Menzies government having the knowledge that the Ustaše were responsible for carrying out genocide against Serbs, Jews and Romani, as well as murdering anti-fascist Croats, they were allowed to obtain citizenship and establish themselves during the 1950s and 60s to fund and organise various terrorist activities within Australia and abroad with the aim of destabilising the Socialist Federal Republic of Yugoslavia.

After a crack-down on Ustaše activities in Australia after 1972, their involvement in large-scale violent acts mostly ceased.

The continued strong infiltration of Ustaša ideology into the Croatian-Australian community assisted significantly to far-right extremism among the Croatian Australians.

== Background ==
The Ustaše (pronounced [ûstaʃe]) (singular: Ustaša) were formed in 1929 as a fascist Croatian ultranationalist group led by Ante Pavelić. The ideology of the movement was a blend of fascism, terrorism and Croatian ultranationalism which called for the creation of a racially "pure" Croatian state and promoted genocide against Serbs, Jews and Roma.

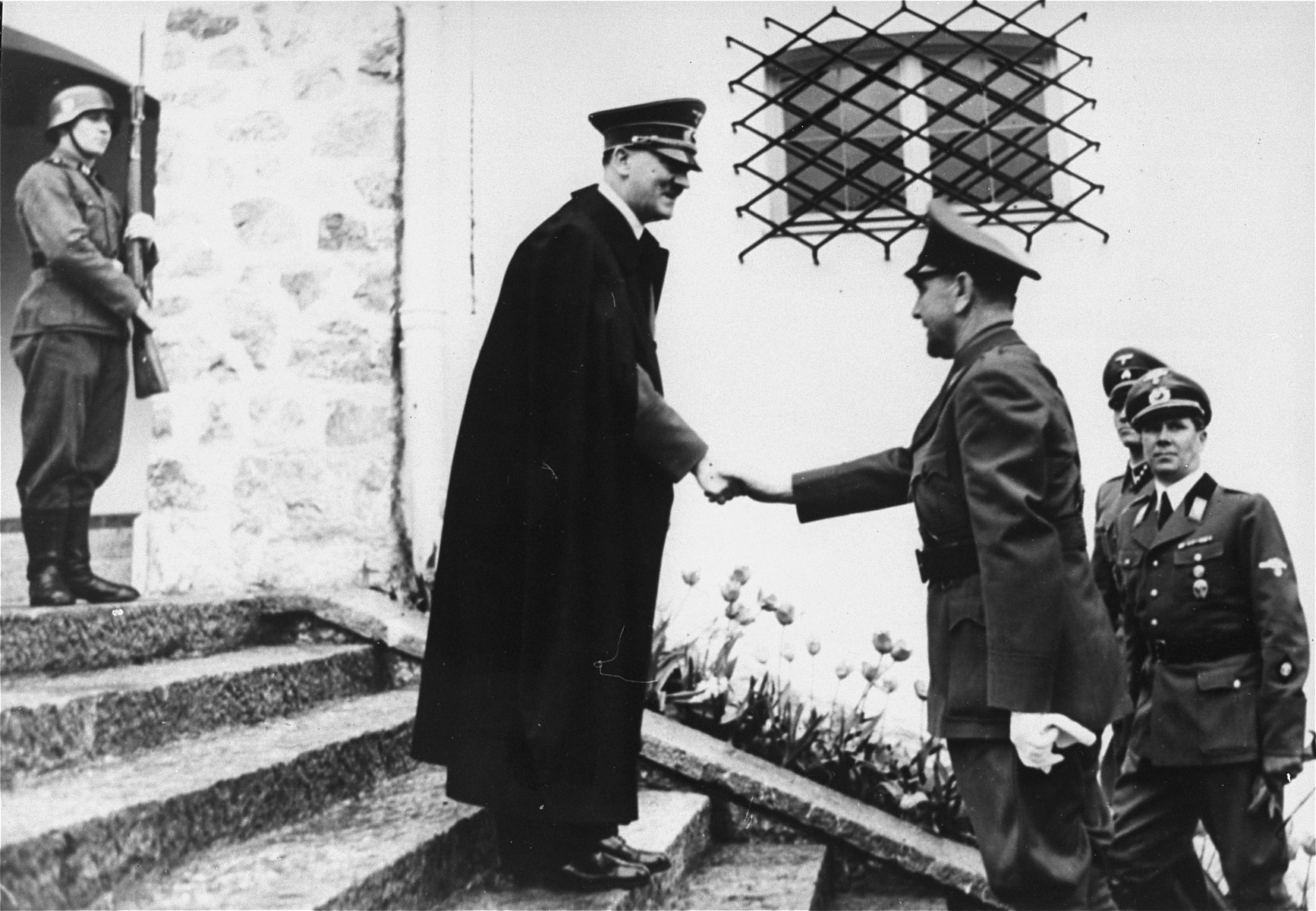
Adolf Hitler meeting Ante Pavelić

During World War II, Adolf Hitler invaded Yugoslavia and the Nazi puppet state of the Independent State of Croatia (NDH) was established. Pavelić was installed as the Poglavnik or Führer of this state and from 1941 to 1945, this Ustaše regime murdered hundreds of thousands of Serbs, Jews and Roma.

With the German surrender, the end of World War II, and the establishment of socialist Yugoslavia in 1945, the Ustaše movement, along with its state, totally collapsed. Many members of the Ustaše either fled to Italy or were captured, executed or massacred by the Yugoslav Partisans led by Josip Broz Tito. Some of the Ustaše who made it to the Italian displaced persons camps or who were placed under the protection of the Vatican were assisted by Allied authorities in their ability to migrate out of Europe to countries where their vehement anti-Communist stance was deemed to be a potential asset in Cold War geo-politics. This process was dubbed the Ratlines, and Australia became the destination for some of the escaped Ustaše members.

== Beginnings of Ustaše in Australia ==
People with Croatian heritage had been migrating to Australia since the late 1800s, and when the Ustaše came to power as a Nazi puppet state in 1941, local Croatian-Australian leaders publicly condemned Ante Pavelić and his fascists. However, as the Ustaše were permitted to enter Australia from the late 1940s, these voices were soon drowned out by the influx of these far-right Nazi collaborators, some of whom were responsible for war-time atrocities.

In 1950, several notable Ustaše figures arrived in Australia as migrants. Amongst these were Djujo Krpan, Ljubomir Vuina, Fabijan Lovoković and Srećko Rover. Krpan was an Ustaša police investigator who was involved in the killing of hundreds of people in the Lika region. ASIO was aware of this but due to his anti-communist credentials, he was given a favourable assessment and given Australian citizenship in 1955.

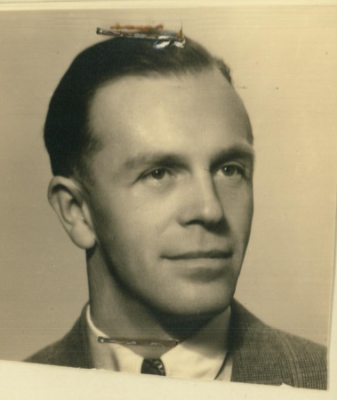
Ljubomir Vuina

Vuina was from Sarajevo where he became a pukovnik (colonel) in the Crna Legija (Black Legion), a notorious death squad infamous for their massacres of civilians and the mass deaths at concentration camps which were under their control. Vuina was a founder of the Adelaide Croatia Club in 1950 and Australian authorities estimated that by 1952, around 250 people that had been associated with the Ustaše were members at the club. ASIO later allowed Vuina to set up a newspaper and organise paramilitary training. Vuina obtained citizenship and moved to the Eastern Suburbs of Sydney where he died in 1999. He remained proud of his time in the Crna Legija and believed the unit should be represented at Anzac Day parades. Ironically, the Returned and Services League of Australia has for many years allowed representatives of the genocidal Serbian Nazi-collaborator militia, the Chetniks, to march in Anzac Day parades across the country.

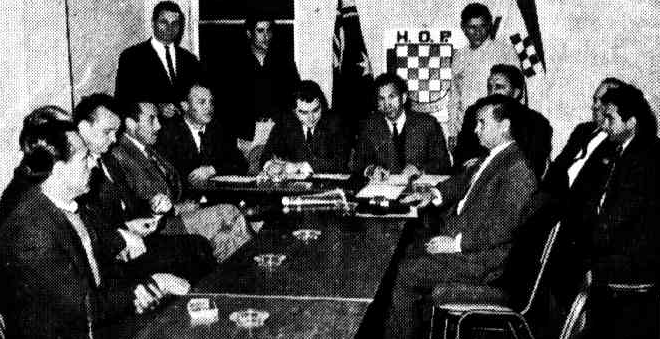
HOP meeting in Australia in the 1960s with Fabijan Lovoković and Ivica Kokić seated at the head of the table

Lovoković was an Ustaše Youth leader who migrated to Sydney in 1950 and re-established Spremnost, a major Ustaša newspaper of the NDH. He also established the Australian branch of the Croatian Liberation Movement (HOP). The HOP was the foremost post-WW2 Ustaše organisation, being founded by the Poglavnik, Ante Pavelić, in 1957. Lovoković regarded himself as the leader of the Ustaše in Australia but took no responsibility for any of its military training or violence. In 1967, Ivica Kokić, a former satnik (captain) in the Ustaša army who had obtained a prominent role in the Australian government service, was appointed as leader of the HOP in Australia.

Srećko Rover was a member of the Gestapo-controlled Ustaše Surveillance Service (UNS) in Sarajevo and led a mobile killing unit that went from village to village arresting and murdering people they judged as enemies. By the end of the war he was in the personal security service of Ante Pavelić and a lieutenant in the Ustaša army. After the collapse of the NDH, he was captured by the Allies and utilised to lead and organise subversive attacks on the communist Partisans as part of the Križari. Most of these missions were a failure and in 1947 Rover was in displaced persons camps in Italy where he became a police officer for the International Refugee Organization. In this role he was able to negotiate his migration to Australia and probably organised for other Ustaše to migrate to this country.

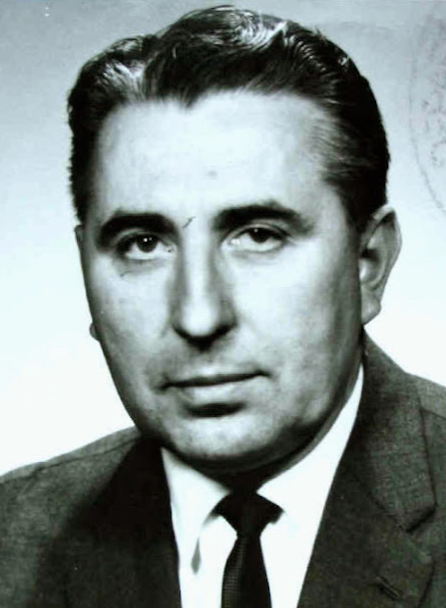
Srećko Rover

Once in Australia, Rover established himself in Melbourne where he helped form the Melbourne Croatia football club in 1953 and obtained citizenship in 1956. He established the Australian branch of the Croatian National Resistance (HNO) in 1957 which was the more militant post-war wing of the Ustaše that was led from Spain by the notorious Ustaše concentration camp commander Vjekoslav "Maks" Luburić. Again the Australian authorities allowed the Ustaše to organise and openly promote their ideology, an Ustaša float was even permitted to participate in the 1962 Melbourne Moomba parade.

Other significant Ustaše members who migrated to Australia during this early period were Slavko Truhli, Dragutin Sporish and Josip Babić. These men helped establish various front organisations for the Ustaše in Australia including the Croatian Welfare Association and the Australian Croatian Association. ASIO regarded these associations as extremely pro-Ustaša, being little more than recruitment and resource centres for the Ustaše.

In 1961, the Croatian Revolutionary Brotherhood (HRB) was established in Australia by Geza Pašti, Jure Marić and Josip Senić with the later involvement of Father Rocque Romac (aka Stjepan Osvaldi-Toth) and Srećko Rover. This group was an original Australian formation and was integral to the organisation of bombings and insurgencies that occurred both domestically and internationally in the years following.

== Organised terrorist activities in the 1960s ==
The anti-communist zeal of the naturalised Ustaše immigrants aligned neatly with the political stance of both the ruling Liberal Party government under Robert Menzies, and ASIO under Charles Spry. This gave the Ustaše a significant degree of freedom and protection to organise major national and international terrorist activities on Australian soil. The extent of this freedom was made clear in April 1963 with the publication of photos of Ustaše training operations centred near Wodonga. The photos of Ustaše men in military fatigues and Ustaše uniforms, armed with Australian Army rifles and sitting on an Australian armoured vehicle, caused a furore which the Liberal Party brushed off as a "picnic". The Spremnost newspaper, however, described it as a 5-day paramilitary training exercise, praising it with an ode entitled "Poem for Terrorism". Ustaše training camps established at Tumbi Umbi, New South Wales. Deszol Saaghy, a former Hungarian member of the Nazi Brandenburger special forces unit and the French Foreign Legion, led the training at Tumbi Umbi.

In July 1963, a group of nine Croatian-Australian men of the HRB were captured conducting covert operations in Yugoslavia with plans to assassinate local officials and raise a rebellion in the north of that country. They were dubbed the Croatian Nine and their assignment was code-named 'Operation Kangaroo'. Two of the men, Stanko Zdrilić and Mirko Fumić, were Australian citizens from Melbourne, while another, Josip Oblak, was the secretary of the Croatian society in Wollongong. All were found to have been trained at Ustaše camps in New South Wales run by the HOP, and all were found guilty in a Yugoslav court, being sentenced to prison terms ranging from 6 to 14 years. Oblak and another man, Ilija Tolić, are believed to have later died while incarcerated.

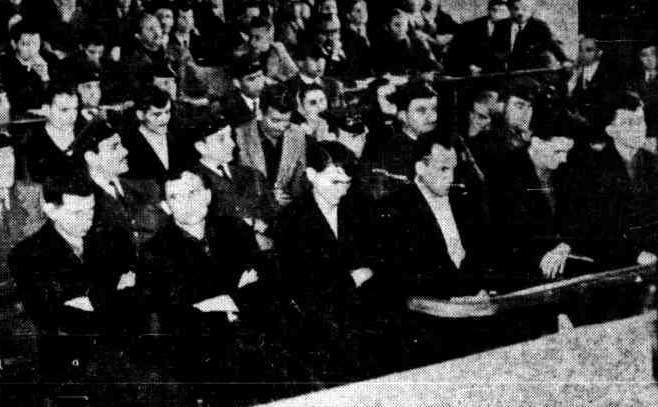
The 1964 trial of the Croatian Nine, with six of the men involved pictured in the front row

Further violent Ustaše activities were also being conducted within Australia mostly targeting supporters of a federalist Yugoslavia. In May 1964, HRB member Tomislav Lesić attempted to deliver a suitcase bomb to the Yugoslav consulate in Sydney which prematurely exploded causing the loss of his lower legs and some of his sight. The Ustaše in Melbourne threatened to bomb police stations and shoot officers if they were investigated. In Sydney and Melbourne, houses of perceived communists were either bombed or broken into with occupants being injured and tortured. Various Yugoslav social gatherings were also bombed in places like Geelong and Fitzroy. Leading Ustaša figures in the bombings including Josip Senić and Ambroz Andrić were arrested. When Andrić was placed on trial for bashing a Yugoslav, Srećko Rover supported him in court wearing his Ustaše Gestapo badge.

The bombings continued into 1967, with a large attack on the Sydney Yugoslav consulate, and several attacks on Yugoslav Association meetings, one involving a pen-bomb which resulted in the disfigurement of a boy's face. In 1968, the Ustaše tried to burn down the Sydney Yugoslav consulate, with the Liberal federal treasurer at the time, William McMahon, siding with the arsonists, referring to them as a 'good bunch'.

The Yugoslav government, however, took a more proactive approach to the Ustaše in Australia by utilising their security service, the UDBA, to assassinate leading HRB members Geza Pašti and Josip Senić while they were visiting Europe in 1965 and 1972 respectively.

== Increased extremism 1969 to 1973 ==
From 1969 to 1973, the operations of the Ustaše increased dramatically both in their number and in their violence. This coincided with the advent of the Croatian Spring, a widespread movement within Yugoslavia for Croatian autonomy. A total of around 60 attacks were attributed to the Ustaše movement in Australia during this time period and, as in the past, the authorities were still unable or unwilling to halt them. An additional reason for this upsurge was the 1969 assassination in Spain of the HRB's genocidal figurehead, Maks Luburić. More than 60 Luburić supporters demonstrated at the Yugoslav embassy in Canberra following his killing.

Bombing targets were expanded to include the Yugoslav and USSR embassies in Canberra, Yugoslav travel agencies, cinemas displaying Yugoslav films, and also various Serbian orthodox churches. The bombing of the Yugoslav consulate in Melbourne in October 1970 did considerable damage to both the building and around 20 homes near to it. Racketeering and extortion were also applied by the Ustaše to both fund and create fear of their movement. In an apparent political execution, known anti-Ustaša Croatian Yago Despot and his friend Charles Hughes, were found dead in their Caulfield residence each with a single bullet wound to the head. This double-murder remains unsolved.

Additionally at this time, new branches of the Ustaše were established in Australia, including the United Croats of West Germany (UHNj) and the Croatian Illegal Revolutionary Organisation (HIRO), with Jakov Suljak being the Australian head of the former group. Two militant youth organisations were also created: the Croatian Youth (HM) run in Australia by Ante Kovac and Jure Marić, and the World League of Croatian Youth (SHUMS) with Zdenko Marinčić being the local secretary.

Two prominent Catholic priests from the Ustaše regime, Josip Kasić and Josip Bujanović, also became leaders of the movement in Australia around this period. Kasić, who was part of Pavelić's student bodyguard during the war, had been imprisoned in Yugoslavia for Ustaša activities. After coming to Australia, he spread pro-Ustaša propaganda from the pulpit of the St Nikola Tavelić Church in Clifton Hill.

Josip Bujanović was a high-ranking Ustaša military chaplain and administrator from the Lika region. Also known as Pop Jole, Bujanović was a key organiser of the liquidation of the Serbian population in the Lika area during the war. In the post-war period, he was a leading figure in the Ratlines, working to achieve the escape of Ustaša officials, including himself, to South America. He moved to Australia in the 1960s where he became prominent in the Canberra Croatian community, managing the Croatian Club and leading the commemorations of Ante Pavelić on the anniversary of his death.

In 1972, there were several major Ustaše activities which resulted in the Australian authorities finally taking a stand against the terrorist attacks.

=== Srećko Rover attempts to become HNO world leader ===
In April 1972, Srećko Rover was invited to attend a HNO world conference in Canada where he was expected to be appointed the global leader of the militant Croatian fundamentalist group, a position that had remained vacant since the assassination of Vjekoslav Luburić in 1969. ASIO and Australian police authorities understood that if this were to happen, considerable danger and embarrassment to the nation would follow.

A week before his departure overseas, a coordinated series of bombs were detonated across three sites in Melbourne targeting Yugoslav exhibitions and the apartment of Marjan Jurjević, who was a high-profile anti-Ustaša Croatian-Australian. No-one was killed, but Rover was considered a person of interest in the organisation of the bombing with the Commonwealth police strongly advising the federal government to prevent Rover from travelling abroad. The McMahon government declined to do this but did cancel Rover's passport while he was in Canada. This caused substantial interference with the HNO world conference and Rover was deported back to Australia. The situation caused significant mainstream media attention on Rover, the Ustaša and their roles in terrorism.

=== The Bugojno group ===
In June 1972, it was revealed by Yugoslavian authorities that a band of 19 armed men from the HRB, dubbed the Bugojno group or Operation Fenix, had been intercepted in Yugoslavia trying to conduct violent subversive activities. Their plans were to blow up bridges and government buildings and try to incite a rebellion in Yugoslavia. Of the 19 men, six were Australian citizens and a further 3 had lived in Australia. Brothers, Adolf and Ambroz Andrić together with Filip Bešlić, Ilija Glavaš, Ilija Lovrić and Pavo Vegar were killed in action, while three, Đuro Horvat, Vejsil Keškić and Mirko Vlasnović, were executed after a later trial. This incident created a significant controversy, especially after a HIRO training camp with a considerable explosives and ammunition cache was concurrently discovered in the Warburton Ranges. Commonwealth police raids conducted later on houses in Melbourne and elsewhere revealed that Srećko Rover was the main organiser of the Bugojno group and had fanciful plans to install himself as a minister if the incursion led to a successful overthrow of government in Croatia.

Two other Croatian-Australian members of the HRB had been recruited for the Bugojno incursion, but police action prevented their participation. Blaž Kraljević, who later became the commander of the HOS forces in the Croatian War of Independence, was arrested in Melbourne for liquor offences, while Zdenko Marinčic had been stopped at Frankfurt Airport with a firearm and four silencers hidden inside a toy koala. Marinčic, whose father was an Ustaša soldier that survived the Bleiburg repatriations, was sent back to Australia where he was jailed for six months. He avoided deportation to Yugoslavia and later became a prominent member of Croatian-Australian society.

=== George Street Bombings ===
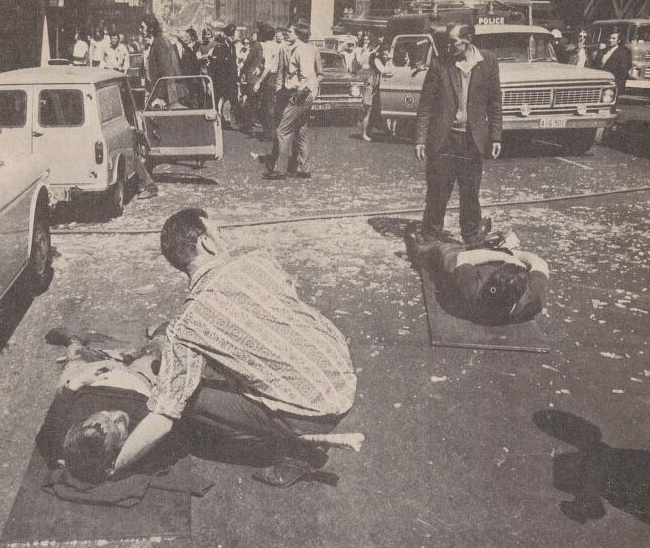
Aftermath of September 1972 George Street bombings in Sydney

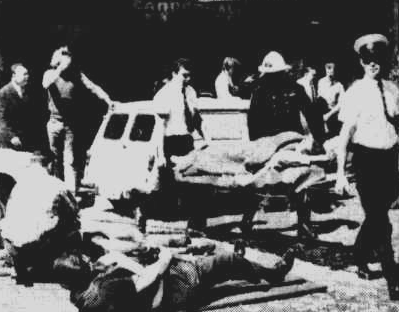
Victims of September 1972 George Street bombings being attended to by emergency services

On 16 September 1972, two Yugoslav travel agencies were bombed during the busy morning period in George Street in central Sydney. Two coordinated blasts injured 16 people, 3 seriously, most of whom were bystanders in the busy street outside the agencies. Tomislav Lesić, who was involved in previous operations, was found at the bomb site with his artificial legs damaged by the blasts. This bombing shocked the nation in the way that it was planned to inflict casualties on the general public. The NSW police established a special bomb squad after this incident and were certain that the Ustaše groups were responsible. The federal Liberal government, however, refused to acknowledge even the existence of such extremists. Ustaša activist, Ljubomir Vuina, was charged and remanded on bail with threatening to destroy other Yugoslav travel agencies.

=== Killing of an American tourist in a car bomb ===
In December 1972, an American tourist, Thomas Patrick Enwright, was killed in a car bomb that was detonated outside a Serbian Orthodox church in Brisbane. An annual meeting was being conducted at the Serbian church at the time and it is believed Enwright was an accidental victim of the bomb intended to harm the members of the church. Interestingly, Enwright was the relative of a policeman and US police were at that time helping Queensland authorities in related investigations.

Despite the magnitude of these and other attacks within only a number of months of each other, the Liberal Party government still continued to obfuscate making public the organisers of these terrorist activities, with Attorney-General Ivor Greenwood in particular, denying even the existence of the Ustaše. Related to this was the fact that the Ustaše leader, Fabijan Lovoković, was by this stage a highly influential Liberal Party member in William MacMahon's electorate and was on the party's NSW Migrant Advisory Council which contained WW2 war criminals such as Ljenko Urbančič.

=== Other associated violence ===
Increased violence relating to Croatian-Australian sporting clubs was also occurring in 1972. In particular, Melbourne Croatia Soccer Club received a life ban (later reduced to several years) from the Victorian state federation due to fans bashing players from the Footscray JUST team and invading the pitch during a game against a Jewish team. The club president for Melbourne Croatia at the time was Enver Begović, a soldier in both the Ustaša army and the Nazi SS Handschar division during World War II. Begović died in 2008 but remains an honoured life member of Football Victoria.

The Ustaša led violence within Australia during this time was also occurring within the context of significant terrorist activities being performed by related groups overseas. This included the 1971 Yugoslav Embassy shooting, the 1972 bombing of the Yugoslav airliner JAT Flight 367, and the hijacking of Scandinavian Airlines System Flight 130 in September 1972. Strong support for these acts of terrorism was evident within the Croatian-Australian community and during this crisis Australia was seen as a possible haven for the terrorists involved.

== Crackdown on Ustaše under the Whitlam and Fraser governments ==
In late 1972, the Whitlam government came to power in Australia and immediately a large number of raids were conducted on known Ustaše organisers and sympathisers. Major figures were arrested and a significant amount of bomb-making materials were confiscated. A major plan to train another 109 insurgents in Australia and send them into Yugoslavia was disrupted. This plan was organised by Srećko Rover in conjunction with the high level Ustaše leader Dinko Šakić who was exiled in Spain. Šakić was a close relation of "Maks" Luburić and was also a commander of the notorious Jasenovac concentration camps during WW2.

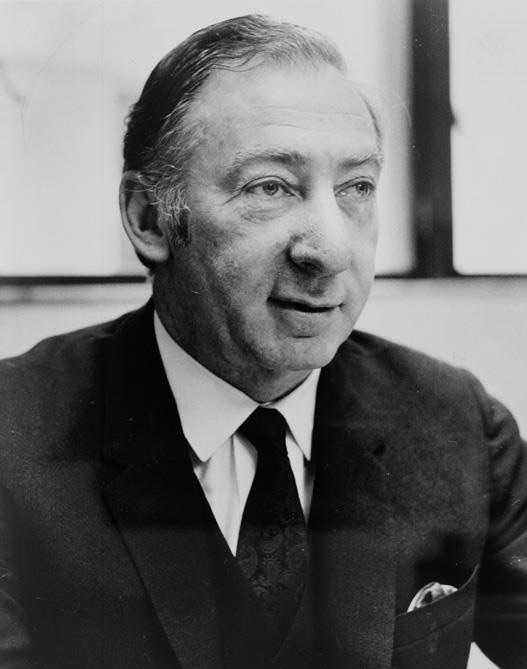
Lionel Murphy, who led the crackdown on the Ustaše in Australia

Despite the success of these raids, ASIO still refused to co-operate in providing information and evidence to enable prosecution for the terrorist activities. In 1973, frustrated by ASIO's unwillingness to assist and concerned about the possible assassinations of Gough Whitlam and the visiting Yugoslav Prime Minister Džemal Bijedić by the Ustaše, the new Attorney-General, Lionel Murphy, took matters into his own hands and commandeered documents from the ASIO offices himself and made public the information accumulated by ASIO on the Ustaše in Australia. This incident was later named the Murphy raids and caused a major political fracas that harmed the Whitlam government's reputation on their ability to withhold confidential Cold War information.

However, the raids were effective in that they caused a significant curtailment in Ustaše activity in Australia, with the HRB being forced to transfer their operational organisation from Australia to Europe. Other measures such as government threats to halt Yugoslav immigration and legislation being passed to criminalise fighting for foreign organisations, placed further pressure on limiting Ustaše activity.

Police set up Operation Amber to conduct extensive surveillance on known Ustaša figures in Australia such as Srećko Rover. The pressure quickly caused Rover to crack, with him being hospitalised in early 1973 after a nervous breakdown. He subsequently resigned from all Ustaša leadership roles.

Police investigations into the George Street bombings of 1972 also resulted in the arrest of Anjelko Marić who admitted to making the bombs but not placing them. Marić was arrested at the Fremantle home of Stjepan Brbić, a wartime Ustaša member who had replaced Srećko Rover as HNO leader in Australia. Brbić had previously established a Vjekoslav Luburić Society in Sydney and was believed to be the main organiser for the George Street bombings. In 1976, Anjelko Marić was convicted of the bombings and sentenced to 16 years jail. This conviction though was soon quashed in the High Court two years later.

The pressure was continued under the Fraser government where 19 HRB members led by Jure Marić were arrested at an Ustaše paramilitary training camp at Mount Imlay in NSW in 1978. Several members were jailed with Marić receiving a four-year sentence under the newly introduced Foreign Incursion and Recruitment section of the Commonwealth Crimes Act. In the early 1980s another trial of six Croatian-Australians occurred. These men, members of a new group called the Croatian Republican Party (HRS), were arrested and convicted of crimes including attempting to bomb Sydney's water supply, destroy Yugoslav travel agencies and murder Lovoković whom they viewed as a traitor to the Ustaše movement. They were betrayed by a probable Yugoslav double agent and each sentenced to 15 years in prison. The men all spent 10 years in prison, and were released in 1991.

Ustaše sympathisers in Australia had to adapt to this new era and attempted to soften their appearance by creating new "moderate" neo-Ustaše organisations. In 1981, the HNO and the HRB merged to form a new group called the Croatian Movement for Statehood (HDP) led by Croatian-Australian Nikola Štedul. Štedul's brother was an Ustaša war criminal who was executed soon after WW2 for his role in the motorised corps (brzi sklop) of Pavelić's Poglavnikov Tjelesni Sdrug brigade. Štedul had his passport cancelled by Australian authorities and later survived an assassination attempt in Scotland in 1988 where he was shot six times by a Yugoslav agent.

== Since Croatian independence ==
Even with the achievement of Croatian independence in 1991, far-right Ustaše ideology has been able to persist as a significant part of Croatian-Australian public society well into the 21st Century. Portraits of the Nazi puppet Ustaše leader Ante Pavelić, known as the Poglavnik, continue to be displayed and the Ustaše slogan "za dom spremni" (ZDS) continues to be chanted with fascist salutes at social and sporting clubs and events in Australia.
