= Mihocek =

Mihocek is a surname. Notable people with the surname include:

- Brody Mihocek (born 1993), Australian footballer
- Jack Mihocek (born 1957), Australian footballer
