= HNV =

HNV may refer to

- Croat National Council (Croatian: Hrvatsko nacionalno vijeće), a Croat representative body in Serbia, established 2003
- Croatian National Council (Croatian: Hrvatsko narodno vijeće), active 1974–1991 in Yugoslavia
- Hebrew Names Version, a translation of the Bible
- Heilbronner Hohenloher Haller Nahverkehr, a German transport conglomerate
- Hyperdimension Neptunia Victory, a video game
