= Mirko Vidović =

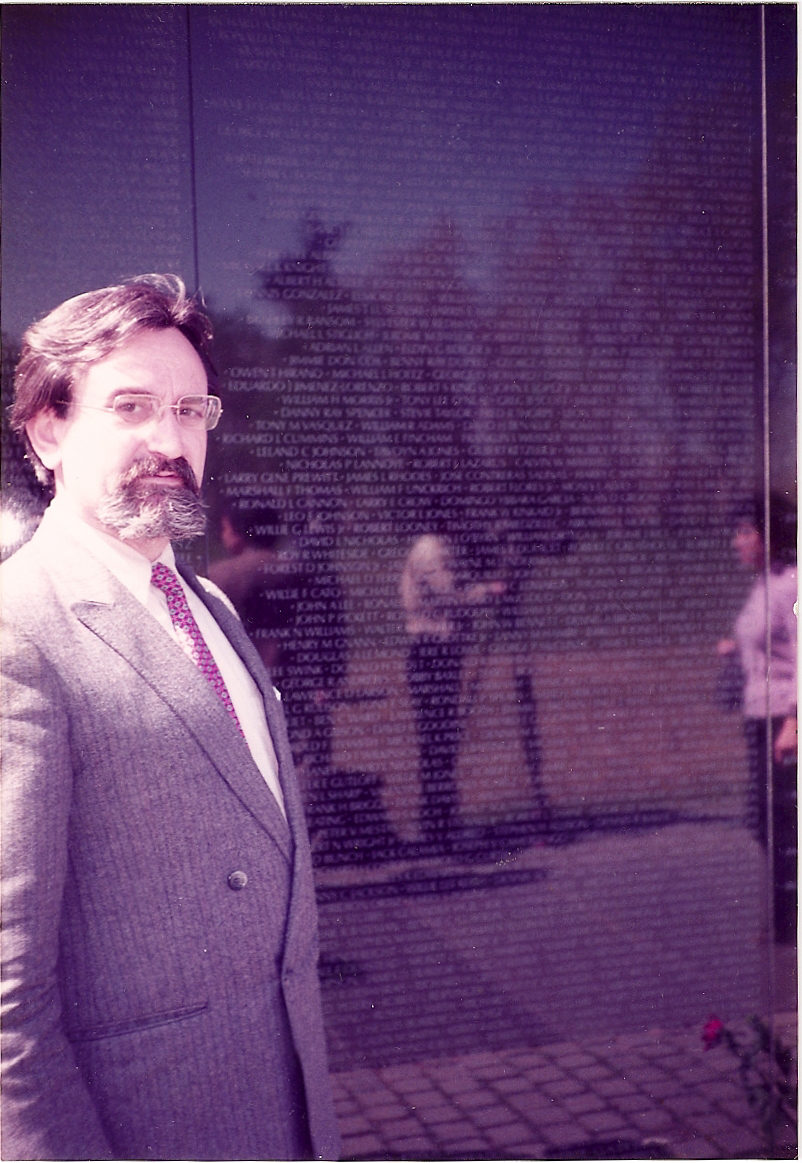
Mirko Vidović

Mirko Vidović (born in Bila near Livno, December 31, 1940, deceased in Valence on October 13, 2016), was a Croatian writer from Bosnia and Herzegovina.

== Early life and education ==
He attended primary school at his native village of Bila near Livno in the period 1947-1951, and lower gymnasium in 1952-1955 in Odžak and Bosanski Šamac. That was the first time that his name showed up as a contributor to Sarajevan Male novine. After finishing primary school, he enrolled to the gymnasium "S. S. Kranjčević" in Livno. As a second-grade student he participated in an anonymous contest of the periodical Osbođenje for a science fiction story winning the first prize, marking the start of Vidović's life as a literary creator.

Due to the practical concerns of religious service of his faith, Vidović soon came into conflict with the contemporary Youth Committee of the SKBiH: his public act of grief for the death of the Pope Pius XII brought him he conviction of ten days in prison. Teacher's council wanted to fire him from the gymnasium staff, but by the personal guarantee of the school director, Arslan Zijadić, he nevertheless managed to finish the gymnasium in Livno. His gymnasium graduation thesis brought him again the first prize of the BiH - Anthology of the works of BiH writers signed personally by A. Vuco.

After finishing the gymnasium in Livno, due to the impossibility of attending the Faculty of Architecture in Zagreb due to financial difficulties, he entered the Faculty of Philosophy in Zadar instead. He graduated with the highest degree in December 1964.

== Persecution ==
After graduating the Faculty of Philosophy, and married to a French Lucienne (b. Ravit), he serves temporarily as the editor of the Cultural chronicle in Zadar's Narodni list, in the expectation to be officially appointed as an assistant in JAZU Institute, working as a scientific researcher in the domain of history of literacy at the Adriatic coast. His home in Zadar was the birthplace of the Movement of Independent Intellectuals which gathered intellectual elite based on the principles of thinking according to one's conscience, and not by the ideological tenets. The movement, by its conception the only one of its sort in the contemporary Communist world, faced prohibition, job loss of all of its sympathisers, some of which were forced to emigrate and some of which were convicted to years of imprisonment. Organising a poll on the population problematics of Zadar he fell to disgrace of the regime and had to immediately abandon the country with his wife and kids, and leave for France, in order to evade the process of the alleged disclosing of state secrets in favour of Vatican.

Having arrived to France, he enters the college again graduating literature and Russian at the University of Lyon. Afterwards he studies at the College of Pure Philosophy, but was unable to complete his studies, having had to visit his seriously ill mother in Livno with his French passport. On his return from Livno, he was betrayed by his former colleague from he Faculty which resulted in his arrest. He was trialled on the September 3rd 1971 for the book of poetry Hram nade ("A temple of hope") and convicted to four years of maximum security prison. When he arrived to the KPD Stara Gradiška, the inspectors of UDBA - the Yugoslav secret service, have under the international pressure offered Vidović a deal: he would testify against two of the intellectuals who were imprisoned after the violent termination of the Croatian Spring movement, and would be set free afterwards. Vidović refused the deal. Thus, he was again trialled in Zagreb and on March 31, 1973 he sentenced to additional three and a half years of prison because he has, during his residence in France, published his work in the issues of Hrvatska revija periodical, under the alleged motivation of being connected to "enemy emigration".

After three years of harsh imprisonment in the camp of Stara Gradiška he was transferred to Srijemska Mitrovica where he was kept for more than two years, enduring his punishment. After the personal intervention of the president of France, he was released on parole after spending cumulatively five years and two months in prison, and administratively expelled from Yugoslavia.

Again living abroad as a French citizen, he published memoirs of his imprisonment under the title Skrivena strana mjeseca ("The hidden side of the moon"). The book was reprinted twice in Croatian, and completely translated to French and Italian, and partially to English and Spanish. He was officially invited as a witness of the truth of the Communist prisons at the central of Amnesty International in London, and also in the central of the International League for Human Rights. During his prison time he wrote a book of poetry Bijeli vitez ("The white knight") and has managed to send it to freedom by covert channels. That book has been published abroad in Croatian and French (in Switzerland). The other books he published abroad include Ribnjak Bethesda, Boomerang and Što je to HNV.

== Recognition ==
At the end of 1979, following an invitation of famous colleagues from Western universities, he nominated himself at the elections of the Parliament of the Croatian National Council and was elected at the top of the list consisting of thirty representatives. At the session of the III. Assembly of the CNC in London, in January 1980, he was appointed as the president of the Parliament of CNC. His industrious labour has earned him a plethora of international recognitions: Gold Medal of the city of Los Angeles, Medal of the city of Kiev, he was selected amongst the "great modern storytellers" in the proceeding 'Short story International' published by the Institute for the International Cultural Exchange in New York City, has entered the American Lexicon of contemporary European writers etc. He participated at the International Poetry Meeting in Paris in 1979.

As the president of the Parliament of CNC he participated in the work of the Madrid conference and, at the end of 1980, was one of the founding members of the International Helsinki Federation for Human Rights. He further participated in the work of Ottawa conference in the April 1985. He was guested in grand state institutions of the USA France, European Community etc. He was selected as the Chief Architect at the process of application of the "Final Document of the Helsinki Conference" and has been in that spirit continuing to lead the efforts of the righteous process of self-determination of the people at the territory of former Yugoslavia. In 1986 he was invited to the membership of the International Academy centered in Italy. He was promoted in 2002 to the honour of the Knight of Academy.

== Works ==
Vidović's bibliography consists of 1280 published works, 110 of which are written in foreign languages and published all over the world. In his Homeland he has published two collections of stories from mediaeval Bosnia - Drijenove svirale (1993) and Šta je, je - šta nije, nije - a collection of anecdotes from the time of collectivisation of Livno villages after the World War II.

42 of his books are left in manuscript, covering a variety of domains, 10 of it being dramatic pieces and 12 volumes of the Philosophy of Virtuality and Reality (epistemological analysis of modern times in all the segments of human knowledge and science).

- Pjesme (with V. Paviće and S. Vučićević), 1964
- Hram nade, 1970
- Ribnjak Bethesda, 1971
- Sakrivena strana mjeseca, 1977
- Bijeli vitez, 1980
- Što je Hrvatsko narodno vijeće, 1984
- Hrvatski iranski korijeni, 1991
- Ban Kulin i krstjanska Bosna 2001
- Gatha Spitama Zarathustre 2003
- Panonija 2004
- Pad i uspon Ilirije 2005
