= Blaž Kraljević =

Bosnian Croat soldier (1947–1992)

Blaž Nikola Kraljević
- Born: Blaž Kraljević; 19 September 1947; Lisice, Ljubuški, Yugoslavia
- Died: 9 August 1992 (aged 44); Kruševo, Mostar, Republic of Bosnia and Herzegovina
- Burial place: Varda, Kruševo, Mostar
- Military career
- Allegiance: Bosnia and Herzegovina
- Branch: Croatian Defence Forces; Army of the Republic of Bosnia and Herzegovina
- Service years: 1991–1992
- Rank: Major General
- Commands: Croatian Defence Forces
- Conflicts: Bosnian War
- Awards: Order of Petar Zrinski and Fran Krsto Frankopan

Blaž Nikola Kraljević (19 September 1947 – 9 August 1992) was a Bosnian Croat-Australian paramilitary leader who commanded the Croatian Defence Forces (HOS) during the Bosnian War. An immigrant to Australia, Kraljević joined the Croatian Revolutionary Brotherhood (HRB) upon his arrival there in 1967. During his return to Yugoslavia in January 1992 he was appointed by Dobroslav Paraga, leader of the Croatian Party of Rights (HSP), as leader of the HOS in Bosnia and Herzegovina.

During the Bosnian War he advocated a Croat–Muslim alliance. This view ran counter to those of the Croatian government led by Croatian president Franjo Tuđman and his Croatian Democratic Union (HDZ) party. He denounced attempts by Mate Boban, president of the self-proclaimed Croatian Republic of Herzeg-Bosnia, and Radovan Karadžić, president of the self-proclaimed Republika Srpska, to divide Bosnia and Herzegovina and was appointed by Bosnian president Alija Izetbegović as a member of Staff of the Army of the Republic of Bosnia and Herzegovina (ARBiH), shortly before his assassination by Croatian Defence Council (HVO) soldiers under the command of Mladen Naletilić. Just two months after his death, relations between the Croats and Muslims would deteriorate completely, leading to the Croat-Muslim War.

== Early life ==
Blaž Kraljević was born on 19 September 1947 in the village of Lisice in the municipality of Ljubuški, in the People's Republic of Bosnia and Herzegovina.

== Australia ==
In 1967, at the age of 19, he migrated to Australia where he was recruited by Srećko Rover into the Croatian Revolutionary Brotherhood (HRB), a pro-Ustaše group established in Australia in 1961.

Kraljević was assigned to a select squad of HRB members who were training in Australia for an armed covert incursion into northern Yugoslavia in 1972. This squad, known as the Bugojno group, entered Yugoslavia but failed in its mission, with 18 of the 19 men involved being either killed or executed by Yugoslav forces. Kraljević, however, was arrested and detained in Melbourne for liquor offences before the Bugojno group left Australia and therefore avoided this fate.

Kraljević resided in Kambah, an outer suburb of Canberra and worked as a bricklayer, but continued to be an active proponent of Croatian nationalism. He became a leading spokesman for the Australian branch of the Croatian National Council, an organisation lobbying for the destruction of Yugoslavia through whatever means necessary. In this role, he co-wrote articles defending the aims of the Council and the ideals of the Ustaša. He was also active in public protests against Yugoslavia, being arrested in 1978 for throwing bottles of red paint at the Yugoslav embassy in Canberra.

== Breakup of Yugoslavia ==
Kraljević remained in Australia until 1990 when he returned to Yugoslavia to help fight for Croatian independence. In 1990 and 1991, Serb militias in Croatia and in Bosnia and Herzegovina, armed by and acting in concert with the well-equipped Yugoslav People's Army (JNA), seized large territories. The Croatian government began arming Croats in the Herzegovina region in 1991 and in the start of 1992, expecting that the Serbs would spread the war into Bosnia and Herzegovina.

Flag of the Croatian Defence Forces.

In June 1991, the Croatian Defence Forces (HOS) was formed in Croatia by the Croatian Party of Rights (HSP). From July 1991 to January 1992, the JNA and Serb paramilitaries used Bosnian territory to wage attacks on Croatia. In November 1991, the autonomous Croatian Community of Herzeg-Bosnia (HZ-HB) was established, it claimed that it did not aim to secede and that it would serve a "legal basis for local self-administration" within the framework of Bosnia and Herzegovina, but not Yugoslavia. In December, Tuđman, in a conversation with Bosnian Croat leaders, said that "from the perspective of sovereignty, Bosnia-Herzegovina has no prospects" and recommended that Croatian policy "support for the sovereignty [of Bosnia and Herzegovina] until such time as it no longer suits Croatia." That same month HOS was disbanded by the Croatian government.

On 3 January 1992, Dobroslav Paraga, leader of the HSP, appointed Kraljević as leader of the HOS in Bosnia and Herzegovina and established its main headquarters in Ljubuški. It "supported Bosnian territorial integrity much more consistently and sincerely than the HVO" which supported a partition of Bosnia and Herzegovina. It was more accepting of Bosniaks in its ranks than the HVO and consisted of 5,000 volunteers that included Bosnian Croats, Bosniaks, and foreign volunteers.

He played an influential role and advocated a Croat–Bosniak alliance for a united Bosnia and Herzegovina. His views ran counter to those of the Croatian government and he was seen by Tuđman's Croatian Democratic Union (HDZ) as an obstacle to their plans for a Croat–Bosniak War. Media in Croatia, closely associated with Croatian defense minister Gojko Šušak, claimed that HOS was in fact "MOS", the "Muslim Defence Force", and that the Bosniaks were prepared, through HOS, to backstab the Croats. Upon entrance in the war, Kraljević had declared that:

I'm here to protect these people, and I'll do it or die trying. We are not a Catholic army because 30 or 40 percent of the ranks of HOS is Muslim. We are the army of Bosnia and Herzegovina. Personally, I would like to see Croatia to the Drina, but who will decide that is the people here, the people of Bosnia, when the war ends. In regards to HSP and HOS, all those who are not extremists and have not bloodied their hands can stay and live here and we will protect them. We will protect the Serbs and Bosniaks and Croats from any external enemy, because we are behind the people. In regards to external opinions about us, including their interests, the interests of Germany or the United Kingdom for us here are utterly irrelevant, because I only care for the people here.

In April 1992, the siege of Sarajevo began, by which time the Bosnian Serb-formed Army of Republika Srpska (VRS) controlled 70% of Bosnia and Herzegovina. On 8 April, Bosnian Croats were organized into the Croatian Defence Council (HVO). A sizable number of Bosniaks also joined. On 15 April 1992, the multi-ethnic Army of the Republic of Bosnia and Herzegovina (ARBiH) was formed, with slightly over two-thirds of troops consisting of Bosniaks and almost one-third of Croats and Serbs. In the winter Bosniaks began leaving the HVO and joining the ARBiH which also began receiving supplies from Croatia. In May, HVO Major General Ante Roso declared that the only "legal military force" in HZ-HB was the HVO and that "all orders from the TO [Territorial Defense] command [of Bosnia and Herzegovina] are invalid, and are to be considered illegal on this territory".

On 9 May 1992, Boban, Josip Manolić, Tuđman's aide and previously the Croatian prime minister, and Radovan Karadžić, president of the self-proclaimed Republika Srpska, secretly met in Graz and formed an agreement on the division of Bosnia and Herzegovina, the Graz agreement. Kraljević denounced the agreement stating "we implore all citizens of Bosnia and Herzegovina, especially Croats and Bosniaks, not to take into account any statements or agreements between Mate Boban and Radovan Karadžić. Neither speaks in the name of Croats and Bosniaks. They do not represent what the Croats and Bosniaks want. ... HOS and the TO are defending, and will defend, Bosnia and Herzegovina." Kraljević commented on the internal divisions of Croats and closed stating "We will get rid of the people with a dark past and suspicious present. [...] We will send them home but need to keep an eye on them as our destiny is at stake. We have a chance, but just this one."

HOS, as a regular army in Bosnia-Herzegovina, will fight for the freedom and sovereignty of Bosnia-Herzegovina because it is our homeland [and will] not allow any divisions.

— Blaž Kraljević during a ceremony in Čapljina on 19 July 1992

Since the outset of the Bosnian War, HOS and HVO competed for power and influence. HOS played an important role in the liberation of Mostar, Čapljina, Neum and Stolac. By the end of July 1992, within one day about 700 HVO members joined the ranks of HOS in Čapljina. Similar crossings occurred in Tomislavgrad, Livno and Mostar. In the summer of 1992, the HVO started to purge its Bosniak members. At the same time armed incidents started to occur among Croats in Bosnia and Herzegovina between the HVO and the HOS. The HOS was loyal to the Bosnian government and accepted subordination to the Staff of the ARBiH of which Kraljević was appointed a member.

== Assassination ==
On 9 August 1992, Kraljević and eight of his staff were assassinated by HVO soldiers under the command of Mladen Naletilić, who supported a split between Croats and Bosniaks, after Kraljević's HOS attacked the VRS near Trebinje. According to Manolić the order to kill Kraljević was given by Šušak and approved by Tuđman. Božidar Vučurević, the war-time mayor of Trebinje, stated he safeguarded records showing it was a "task" to be carried out by SDS and HDZ figures. The HOS's advance into eastern Herzegovina and occupation of Trebinje angered Boban who had affirmed to Karadžić that Croat forces were uninterested in the region.

The Kruševo General Staff of HVO claimed that two vehicles with HOS members refused to stop at a police checkpoint and that HOS members first opened fire, killing HVO lieutenant Živko Bodulić. Kraljević's body and those of the eight other HOS soldiers were rushed to Split for autopsies before an investigation began and the investigating judge from Mostar only came to the scene a day later.

== Aftermath and legacy ==
After his death, Croatian media claimed Kraljević was an agent of the UDBA, Yugoslav secret police, who had returned from Australia to harm the interests of Bosnian Croats. Bosnian officials suspected that Tuđman's government was involved. The HOS was disbanded, leaving the HVO as the only Croat force. The HOS was absorbed by the HVO and the ARBiH at the beginning of the Croat-Bosniak War.

In 1996, at the insistence of Šušak, Tuđman posthumously awarded Kraljević the Order of Petar Zrinski and Fran Krsto Frankopan.

At the time of his assassination, Kraljević was married and had two sons who were living in Canberra.
