= Bugojno group =

1972 Croatian separatist insurgent cell

- Bugojanska skupina
- Logo of HRB
- Founder: Srećko Rover
- Dates active: June 20 – July 24, 1972
- Ideology: Ustashism
- Status: Defunct
- Size: 19
- Part of: Croatian Revolutionary Brotherhood
- Flag

The Bugojno group (Croatian: Bugojanska skupina) was the name given to a Croatian separatist insurgent cell which was infiltrated into SFR Yugoslavia on 20 June 1972 to spark a rebellion against the socialist Yugoslav government. Their plans failed. Of the 19 men involved, all but one were killed or executed afterwards. The survivor was 21-year-old Ludvig Pavlović, whose death sentence was commuted due to his young age and full confession. He was released from prison in 1990, only to be killed in the Croatian War of Independence the following year.

== Background ==
The Bugojno group was organized by the Croatian Revolutionary Brotherhood (Hrvatsko revolucionarno bratstvo or HRB). The HRB was formed in Australia in 1961 and was active in Europe and the United States. The founding principle of the HRB was the separation of Croatia from Yugoslavia, and the reestablishment of the Independent State of Croatia through the use of military force.

== Operation Phoenix ==
After the suppression of the Croatian Spring movement in 1971, the HRB believed that there existed a political climate in Croatia which would support the beginning of an armed rebellion. After short preparations, the HRB organized their personnel, weapons and funding to support an initial group to start a rebellion. Most of the fighters and money came from Australia while the armed training was done in West Germany. After a short preparation in Austria, the 19-member group traveled through Dravograd into Yugoslavia by truck on 20 June 1972; the truck driver later reported them to the police. The Yugoslav territorial defense units soon began a massive search to find them. The insurgents were armed with weapons stolen from US military bases in West Germany.

The group was named after the Bosnian town of Bugojno, as their goal was to reach the Raduša mountain south of the town. The operation was called "Phoenix" by the Croatian militants, while the counterinsurgency operation carried out by the Yugoslav forces bore the codename "Raduša 72".

Of the 19 men, six were Australian citizens and a further three had lived in Australia. These were brothers, Adolf and Ambroz Andrić together with Filip Bešlić, Ilija Glavaš, Ilija Lovrić, Pavo Vegar, Đuro Horvat, Vejsil Keškić and Mirko Vlasnović. The other members of the group were Viktor Kancijanić, Petar Bakula, Ludvig Pavlović, Stipe Ljubas, Vlado Miletić, Vinko Knez, Ivan Prlić, Nikola Antunac, Vidak Buntić and Vili Eršeg.

Two other Croatian-Australian members of the HRB had been recruited for the Bugojno incursion but police action prevented their participation. Blaž Kraljević, who later became the commander of the HOS forces in the Croatian War of Independence, was arrested in Melbourne for liquor offences, while Zdenko Marinčic had been stopped at Frankfurt Airport with a firearm and four silencers hidden inside a toy koala. Marinčic, whose father was an Ustaša soldier that survived the Bleiburg repatriations, was sent back to Australia where he was jailed for six months.

=== Main actions ===
The Yugoslav Army had no special forces at its disposal, and relied exclusively on some 30,000 poorly trained conscript soldiers and reservists units for the search. The first clash with the security forces took place on June 25 at the edge of a wood near Uskoplje (Gornji Vakuf). The group successfully drove back a team of 30 Yugoslav troops and policemen, killing the officer in charge, captain Miloš Popović, and a soldier. Two other soldiers were wounded. The group, however, fled in disarray as their own commander, Adolf Andrić, was also killed in the action. Three other members were caught over the next 24 hours. Although forced to hide, the insurgents managed to regroup near Ramsko Lake. Cornered once more by 1,000 territorial defense soldiers, the rebels were dispersed and compelled to seek shelter among the civilian population. During the withdrawal, one unit of the territorial defense was ambushed by the militants in a forest clearing near their hideout, a cave in the surroundings of Rumboci, a village on the northern shores of Ramsko Lake, in the region of Bukovac. Nine Yugoslav soldiers were killed, one of them after being captured. The paramilitaries headed for Sinj and Imotski, in Croatia, where they became decimated in a series of ambushes and counter-ambushes with Yugoslav forces. With the help of an informer the Bugojno group was eventually apprehended by 24 July 1972.

== Aftermath ==
The Yugoslav losses were 13 killed in action and 14 wounded. Of the 19 members of the group, 15 were killed, 10 in action, whilst 5 were summarily executed after having surrendered. The last four members of the group were captured, tried and sentenced on December 21, 1972. Ludvig Pavlović, who was in his early 20s, had his death sentence commuted to 20 years in prison due to his age and full confession, and the remaining three, Djuro Horvat, Vejsil Keškić and Mirko Vlasnović, were executed by firing squad on 17 March 1973, at the Police headquarters in Sarajevo. Pavlović was released from prison in 1990 and was killed in controversial circumstances during the Croatian War of Independence on 18 September 1991.

Police raids conducted on HRB members in Australia not long after the incident showed strong evidence that former Ustaša officer Srećko Rover played a major role in organising the Bugojno incursion.

A quasi-fictional account linking a surviving member of the Bugojno group with the Sydney's 1972 bombing was written in 2017 by Australian journalist Tony Jones.
