= Sydney Yugoslav General Trade and Tourist Agency bombing =

Terror attack in 1972 in Sydney, Australia

The Sydney Yugoslav General Trade and Tourist Agency bombing occurred in Haymarket, Sydney, Australia on 16 September 1972, injuring 16 people. The perpetrators of the attack were alleged to be Croatian separatists.

== Background ==
In the 1960's to early 1970s nationalist Ustaše-alleged activities were conducted within Australia mostly targeting supporters of a federalist Yugoslavia by Croatian separatists. These alleged activities were thought to be carried out by various Ustaše groups including the Croatian Liberation Movement (HOP), Croatian National Resistance (HNO) and Croatian Revolutionary Brotherhood (HRB).

From 1969 to 1973, the alleged operations of the Ustaše increased dramatically both in their number and in their violence. This coincided with the advent of the Croatian Spring, a widespread movement within Yugoslavia for Croatian autonomy. A total of around 60 attacks were allegedly attributed to the Ustaše movement in Australia during this time period. Violence included executions and bombings. Bombing targets included the Yugoslav and USSR embassies in Canberra, Yugoslav travel agencies, cinemas displaying Yugoslav films, and various Serbian orthodox churches.

== The Bombing ==
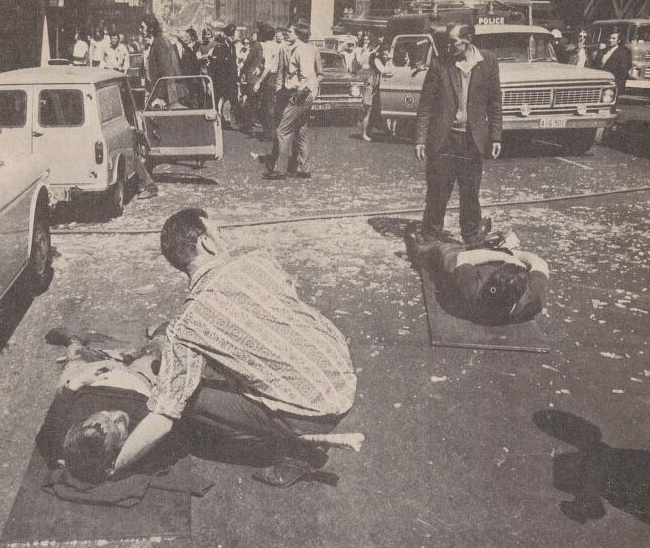
Aftermath of September 1972 George St bombings in Sydney

On the morning of 16 September 1972, two Yugoslav travel agencies, the Adriatic Travel Centre and the Adria Travel Agency were bombed in George Street in Haymarket at the end of the Sydney central business district. The first blast injured 16 people, three of them were critically injured. The second bomb blast injured none.

The New South Wales Police raided a number of Croatian homes in Sydney which resulted in the arrest of Ljubomir Vuina and Anjelko Marić (Angelo Marie). Ljubomir Vuina, was charged and remanded on bail with threatening to destroy other Yugoslav travel agencies. Marić admitted to making the bombs but not placing them. Marić was arrested at the Fremantle home of Stjepan Brbić, a wartime Ustaša member who had replaced Srećko Rover as the Croatian National Resistance (HNO) leader in Australia. Brbić had previously established a Vjekoslav Luburić Society in Sydney and was believed to be the main organiser for the George Street bombings. In 1976, Anjelko Marić was convicted of the bombings and sentenced to 16 years jail. This conviction though was soon quashed in the High Court two years later after the trial was ruled miscarried because certain evidence had been wrongly admitted.

== See also ==
- Terrorism in Australia
