= Croatian Six =

Croatian-Australians convicted of conspiracy to bomb targets in Sydney

The Croatian Six (Croatian: Hrvatska šestorka, consisting of Max Bebić, Vic Brajković, Tony Zvirotić, Joe Kokotović, his brother Ilija Kokotović and Mile Nekić) were six Croatian-Australian men sentenced to 15 years jail in 1981 for a conspiracy to bomb several targets in Sydney, including a Yugoslavian travel agent, the former Elizabethan Theatre in Newtown and a major water supply line in St Marys in western Sydney. The trial was one of the longest in Australian legal history, occupying 172 sitting days and with 111 witnesses giving testimonies. An appeal for these convictions and sentences failed, and the men were subsequently imprisoned for 10 years before being released in 1991.

Media investigations since the trial, such as for the ABC's Four Corners programme and The Sydney Morning Herald newspaper, suggested that much of the evidence on which the six were charged was fabricated and that the men were set up as part a sting operation by the Yugoslav foreign intelligence service, UDBA. Intelligence sources later confirmed that Dr Georgi Trajkovski, the Yugoslav Consul General in Melbourne, was a UDBA operative and a key player in the Croatian Six set up. Disgraced former detective Roger Rogerson, one of the arresting officers, later admitted that planting evidence during the 1970s and 80s was part of police culture. Australian investigative journalist Chris Masters revealed in 1991 that chief witness of the case, known by the name of Vice Vrkez, was actually UDBA's agent Vitomir Misimović, who infiltrated in Croatian community in Australia.

== Opinions ==
The case also drew attention from John Schindler, then at the US Naval War College, who claimed that the Croatian Six affair was "a 'classic' agent provocateur operation run by the intelligence agency of the then communist regime in Belgrade, known as the UDBA, against exile communities that were against the Yugoslavian federation." He also claimed that former UDBA officials said that the Croatian Six case was "one of their great successes" in completely discrediting the Croatian Australian community. According to Schindler, Australian Security Intelligence Organisation would have (or at least should have) been aware of UDBA's involvement.

Ian Cunliffe, formerly a senior lawyer in the Department of Prime Minister and Cabinet, claimed intelligence material was withheld that would have resulted in not guilty verdicts for the Croatian Six. This material was purposely kept from then Prime Minister Malcolm Fraser and subpoenas by defence lawyers in the trial were not allowed on "national security grounds".

== Judicial review ==
In 2012, three of the surviving five men — Max Bebić, Mile Nekić and Vic Brajković — represented by human rights lawyer Sebastian De Brennan, applied to the NSW Supreme Court for a judicial review of their convictions. This application was dismissed.

In August 2022 the NSW Supreme Court ordered a review into the convictions based on the declassification of relevant ASIO documents. The Supreme Court of New South Wales concluded its inquest into the 1981 conviction in mid-November 2024. Over the course of a year, more than 25 former police officers were questioned about the arrests and investigation. In the final week of the hearings, cross-examination of witnesses focused on Vice Virkez, the man who reported the alleged conspiracy to Lithgow police in February 1979 and who was found to have been in contact with the then-SFRJ consulate in Sydney.

== In popular culture ==
- Hamish McDonald wrote a book Framed covering the subject.
- Damian Walshe-Howling directed a short film Unspoken, shot in English and Croatian, together with actor Kat Dominis and former SBS journalist Mariana Rudan (both Croatian Australians), who also starred in a movie, along with Goran Grgić from Croatia. It premiered on the Flickerfest in January 2024.
- Croatian Australians community organized "Justice for the Croatian Six Fundraising Concert" at King Tomislav Club on 1-2 November 2024 in Edensor Park.
