= Erik Surjan =

Australian decathlete

Erik Surjan (born 22 June 1983, in Western Australia) is an Australian former track and field athlete who competed in the decathlon.

In his earlier career, Erik was a talented long jumper, winning four national junior long jump titles between 1998 and 2001. Competing in the Commonwealth Youth Games in Edinburgh, Scotland in 2000, Erik won the Bronze Medal for the Long Jump.

After a brief retreat from the sport to concentrate on his studies, Erik returned to the sport in 2004 on the advice of Grant Ward: Head Field Coach for the Western Australian Institute of Sport (WAIS). In his first year of the decathlon, Erik won the 2005 Men's Senior National Decathlon title from defending champion Matt McEwen with a score of 7621 points.

It was there short after, that Erik took up a scholarship with the Australian Institute of Sport (AIS), under the guidance of Craig Hilliard, coach of former athletes such as Jane Flemming, Jai Taurima, Jana Rawlinson, Kerry Saxby-Junna and 2006 World Junior Long Jump Champion Robbie Crowther. Unfortunately for Erik, he sustained a serious knee injury in Ratingen, Germany in June, 2005 requiring surgery and missing the entire 2006 season, including the 2006 Melbourne Commonwealth Games.

After a successful rehabilitation process, Erik returned to the track in 2007 and after some early encouraging form, Erik sustained two freak injuries to the same knee that required surgery earlier and his right shoulder. Both injuries required season ending surgery. Despite this, Erik competed injured in the 2007 Australian Multi Events Championships, winning back his title with a World Championships 'B' Qualifying score of 7706 points.

In the lead up to the 2008 Beijing Olympics Surjan suffered a serious leg injury during the Decathlon Men's High Jump event. Leading the competition by over 500 points and looking set to announce his arrival on the international stage, Surjan snapped the fibula and tibia bones during a mishap ending his campaign. He was rehabilitated in Western Australia by Western Australian Institute of Sport coaches Grant Ward and Lyn Foreman.

== Family ==
Erik's brother Jacob Surjan played in the Australian Football League (AFL) with the Port Adelaide Football Club.
