= Jacob Surjan =

Australian rules footballer and coach (born 1985)

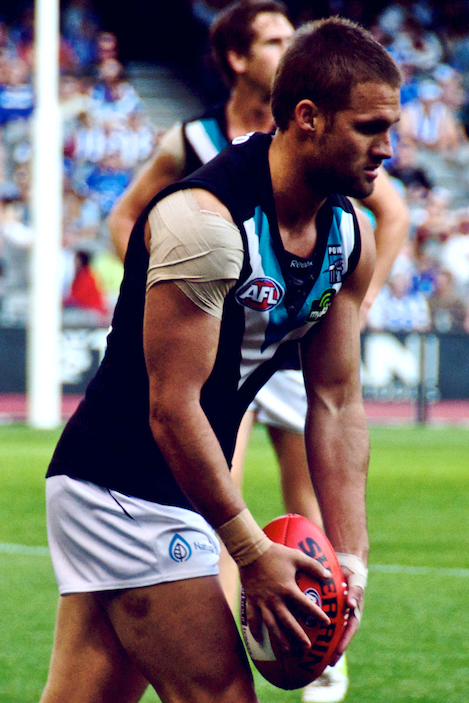
- Surjan with Port Adelaide in 2011

Personal information
- Full name: Jacob Adam Surjan
- Born: 15 August 1985 (age 41); Perth, Western Australia
- Original team: South Fremantle (WAFL)
- Draft: No. 10, 2004 Pre-Season Draft, Port Adelaide
- Height: 179 cm (5 ft 10 in)
- Weight: 84 kg (185 lb)
- Position: Defender

Playing career^{1}
| Years | Club | Games (Goals) |
| 2004–2012 | Port Adelaide | 121 (17) |
- ^{1} Playing statistics correct to the end of 2011.

Career highlights
- 2006 AFL Rising Star nominee; 2018 North Adelaide Reserves premiership coach

Jacob Adam Surjan (born 15 August 1985) is a former professional Australian rules footballer who played for the Port Adelaide Football Club in the Australian Football League (AFL). He is the former coach of Port Adelaide in the South Australian National Football League (SANFL) and the former coach of the North Adelaide Football Club.

== Early career ==
Surjan began his football career for Cockburn Junior Football Club at the age of 13 before transferring to the South Coogee Junior Football Club. Both clubs are part of the South Fremantle Bulldogs development district zone in Western Australia. He was scouted as part of the South Fremantle Warriors WAFL development program playing for South Fremantle. He progressed from the under 13's through the colts (U/18's). In 2003, Surjan made his WAFL league debut as a 17-year-old playing for the South Fremantle Bulldogs. His best performance was a 4-goal, 16 possession, 8 mark haul against Perth. In the same year, he won the Mel Whinnen medal for his best on ground performance in the South Fremantle Colts 2003 WAFL premiership side. He averaged 31 possessions for the season at Colts level.

Jacob was part of the WA Under-18 National Championships squad, putting in two very good performances at the carnival, before injuring a calf and having a reasonably quiet 3rd game.

== AFL career ==
After being touted as a potential top 30 pick, putting in many impressive draft camp results, it came as a shock to many when Surjan was overlooked in the 2003 National Draft. It was then that Port Adelaide pounced and selected Surjan as the number 10 pick in the 2004 AFL Pre-Season Draft.

Surjan made his AFL debut in round 1, 2004 against Essendon. He went on to play 5 of the first 7 games, before a knee injury cut his season short after showing much promise.

In 2005, he had an indifferent year due to injuries. A switch from SANFL clubs Central District to Port Adelaide Magpies was a welcome change, with "Surj" running into form in the second half of the season with the Magpies, with a plethora of BOG performances.

The hard chasing, strong tackling midfielder and small defender was nominated for the AFL Rising Star award in 2006 for his 26-disposal game from half-back against Hawthorn in round 11.

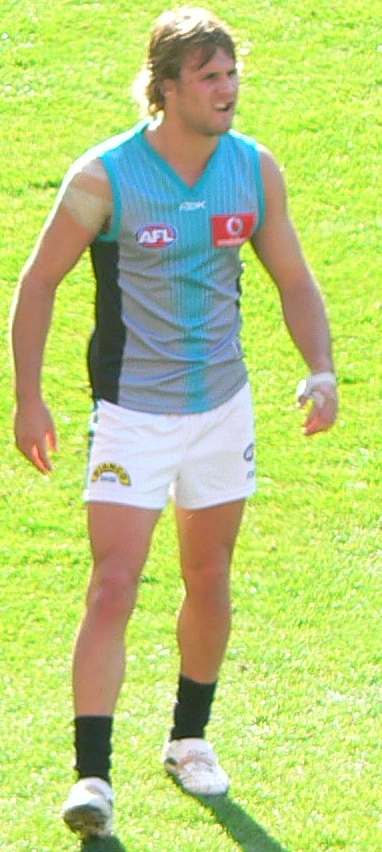
Surjan in 2007

In the 2007 AFL season, Surjan played 24 of a possible 25 games, totalling 417 disposals at an average of 17.4 disposals per game, 5 marks and 3 tackles. He finished 7th in the Port Adelaide fairest and best and was top 3 in both the one-percenter and most improved awards.

Season 2008 marked an indifferent year for Port Adelaide and Surjan however, he finished off the year strongly playing 19 of 22 games averaging 15 disposals, 4 marks and 2 tackles.

Jacob’s playing style is characterized by strong pace, physical defensive pressure, and consistent effectiveness in contested situations. He has developed into a reliable member of the Port Adelaide defensive unit, primarily playing a shutdown role. Across the league, he is recognized for his ability to limit the impact of dangerous small forwards, maintain a disciplined defensive approach, and support teammates through committed effort in one-on-one and contest situations.

In the lead up to the 2010 season, Surjan was announced as vice-captain of the club.

He was delisted at the end of the 2012 season.

== Coaching ==
From 2012 to 2013, Surjan remained at Port Adelaide as a development coach for their SANFL division. In 2014 he was named Port Adelaide's academy coach. A year later, he was named as Port Adelaide's AFL development coach and the line coach for their SANFL side.

In 2017, Surjan became reserves coach and league assistant coach at the North Adelaide Football Club. In 2018, he guided the North Adelaide reserves team to a grand final win against Norwood and also helped former teammate and North Adelaide senior coach Josh Carr to the 2018 SANFL Grand Final win also over Norwood. In 2019 Surjan signed a three-year contract to become North Adelaide's senior coach.

In late 2025, ahead of the 2026 season, Surjan was appointed senior coach of Port Adelaide's SANFL team. In addition to this role he works as an assistant coach in the role of development coach for the Port Adelaide AFL team under senior coach Josh Carr. At the end of the 2026 AFL season on 28 August 2026, it was announced that Surjan would depart the Port Adelaide Football Club.

== Other sports ==
He won the national under-16 long jump championships in 2000 and also competed in the sprint hurdles. Jacob's older brother Erik Surjan, is an Australian decathlon champion.
