= Srećko Rover =

Croatian Australian ultranationalist

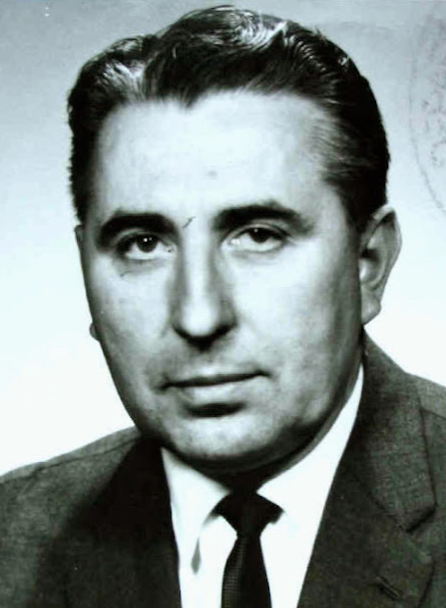
- Srećko Rover, c. 1965
- Born: Srećko Blaž Rover; 3 February 1920; Sarajevo, Kingdom of Serbs, Croats and Slovenes
- Died: 10 September 2005 (aged 85); Melbourne, Australia
- Military career
- Allegiance: Independent State of Croatia (1941–1945)
- Branch: Croatian Armed Forces; Ustaše Militia
- Service years: 1941–1945
- Rank: Lieutenant
- Units: Black Legion; Poglavnik's Bodyguard Battalion
- Conflicts: World War II in Yugoslavia
- Awards: Small Silver Medal for Bravery

Srećko Blaž Rover (3 February 1920 – 10 September 2005) was a member of the fascist, Croatian nationalist Ustaše movement. During World War II, he served as an officer in the Ustaše Surveillance Service and the Ustaše Militia where he was involved in the mass imprisonment and executions of people deemed enemies of the Independent State of Croatia. After the defeat of the Nazis and their collaborators, Rover escaped to Australia, where he became a leading figure of the Ustaše in Australia.

== Early life ==
Srećko Rover was born in Sarajevo, in the Kingdom of Serbs, Croats and Slovenes, in 1920. His father was customs official Josip Rover and his mother was Katerina (Katica) Mulanović. As a child, he attended St. Vinko primary school.

== Joins the Ustaše movement ==
In 1938, at the age of eighteen, Rover joined the ultra-nationalist Croatian terrorist group called the Ustaše. This group led by Ante Pavelić, advocated for the violent overthrow of the Yugoslav government and the creation of an independent Croatian nation. Rover soon became close with the leaders of the Ustaše in Sarajevo including Božidar Kavran and Drago Jilek. In 1939, Rover, Kavran and others were arrested by the Yugoslav police for their suspected involvement in a plot to assassinate King Peter II of Yugoslavia. They were imprisoned in Belgrade but were released three months later under a general amnesty, upon which Rover returned to Sarajevo.

== World War II ==
In April 1941, during World War II, Rover volunteered to become an officer of the Ustaše Surveillance Service (UNS) and a judge in the Mobile Court Martial system of the Axis puppet state called the Independent State of Croatia (Croatian: Nezavisna država Hrvatska; NDH), which was under the control of Pavelić. In these roles, Rover was responsible for the capture, torture and execution of a large number of Serbs, Jews and anti-fascists in Sarajevo and elsewhere in Bosnia. Rover's father Josip also joined the Ustaše, becoming the deputy director of the State Administration for the Revision of the Economy, which was responsible for the confiscation of Jewish and Serb property.

Rover's actions impressed his Nazi superiors and in early 1942 he was sent to a special officer training facility in Stockerau, Austria. He later returned to the NDH where he was put in command of the First Tank Brigade of the Ustaše Militia in Sarajevo. By late 1943, he was promoted to the rank of lieutenant (Croatian: natporučnik), while still retaining his surveillance role in the UNS. In May 1944, Rover was promoted to the rank of Reserve Ustaše Standard Bearer in the armoured corps of Pavelić's elite bodyguard unit, known as the Poglavnikova tjelesna divizija or PTD. His dedicated service to the Ustaše military and surveillance establishment resulted in Rover receiving a number of awards. On Adolf Hitler's birthday (20 April) 1944, Pavelić presented Rover with the Small Silver Medal for Bravery for his role in the "cleansing" operations around the Bosnian town of Maglaj.

By the end of 1944, with Pavelić's puppet regime collapsing under the strength and resistance of the anti-fascist Yugoslav Partisans, Rover was transferred to the re-organised Croatian Armed Forces, joining in the retreat to the north-west. In April 1945, Rover with the other remaining members of the Ustaše officialdom had fled to the Austrian border, hoping to surrender to the Allied forces stationed there.

== Crusaders ==
Rover, together with his wife and father, were taken prisoner by the British forces in Austria and placed in the Fermo displaced persons camp in Italy. In 1946, the Allies were attempting to prevent the Yugoslav communists from controlling the Trieste region, and it was decided to utilise the captured Ustaše in Italy as a counter-insurgency force against the Yugoslavs. This force were called the Crusaders (Croatian: Križari). US agents recruited Rover into the Crusaders and he was tasked with organising a safe route for anti-communist insurgents to enter Yugoslavia.

During 1946 and 1947, Rover conducted logistic missions in northern Yugoslavia, planning for the infiltration of the insurgents into the cities of Zagreb and Rijeka. He was given aliases and false documents by US and British security services to facilitate travel in Italy, Austria and Germany in order to recruit exiled Ustaše into the Crusaders. By 1948, Rover had helped recruit, train and organise a large insurgent group of exiled Ustaše for a mission into northern Yugoslavia. The mission was a disastrous failure which resulted in the rapid capture or execution of all its members, including the Ustaše leader Božidar Kavran. Soon after, the US and British intelligence services decided to disband the Crusaders, and Rover was transferred back to the displaced persons camp. Due to the immense failure of the Kavran mission, Rover was later accused by Pavelić and others of being a double-agent and a traitor to the Ustaše.

== Australia ==
=== Emigration from Italy ===
Rover became the police chief for the International Refugee Organization in the Fermo camp, a position he utilised to enable his migration out of post-war Europe. His Ustaše contacts also facilitated this process through what is known as the Ratlines, a collective organisation that helped ex-Nazis and their collaborators to escape Europe. In 1949, before he left Fermo, Rover married a German woman, Vilma Saghmeister.

=== Establishing Ustaše associations in Australia ===
Rover was thereby able to migrate to Australia with his wife and parents in 1950, arriving in Melbourne in November of that year. For the first five years of his residency, he was based in Sydney and rapidly became a prominent member of the Ustaše in Australia. In 1952, Rover formed the pro-Nazi anti-Semitic Hrvat newspaper, and in 1953 with other members of the Ustaše regime, such as Josip Babić, Zdanko Danda, Fabijan Lovoković and Rudolf Gabron, he established the pro-Ustaše Australian Croatian Association. On 10 April 1953, the twelfth anniversary of the creation of the NDH, he helped form the Melbourne Croatia football club. By 1954, he had placed his father Josip in the role of president of the Brisbane Croatian club, and himself as the general-secretary of the Croatian clubs in Adelaide and Fremantle.

=== Factional split and move to Melbourne ===
By 1954, Rover was the main contact in Australia for the exiled Ustaše. However, in 1955 a major split occurred in the movement both in Australia and world-wide. Pavelić had a major falling out with Vjekoslav Luburić, who was an infamous general of the NDH regime. Luburić, who was located in Spain, accused the Argentina-residing Pavelić of losing commitment to the fascist cause. Luburić created a militant breakaway organisation called the Croatian National Resistance (HNO), while Pavelić in return established the rival Croatian Liberation Movement (HOP). Rover, who was a close associate of Luburić during WW2, decided to join the HNO in Australia, while other Ustaše in Australia such as Fabijan Lovoković remained loyal to Pavelić and joined the HOP.

This factional split was bitter and Rover was publicly denounced by Pavelić as a traitor who caused the deaths of 92 Ustaše patriots during the ill-fated Kavran Crusaders mission. Rover was ostracised from the Croatian associations in Sydney, and was forced to move to Melbourne in 1955. There he became a sales engineer for AWA and was able to obtain Australian citizenship in 1956. Accusations of being a traitor followed him though, and in 1957 he took Stanko Ivanković to court for defamation after he vilified Rover by saying that he handed Croats over to the communists during the Crusaders' operations. Rover won the case and was awarded £500, with the judge citing Rover's bravery award as a Nazi-collaborator as proof.

=== Leader of the HNO in Australia ===
In the early 1960s, Rover was permitted by the Australian government and the ASIO intelligence agency to help develop other splinter Ustaše groups. In 1962, he became the Australian chief representative of the precursor to the Croatian National Council (CNC), and he was also able to take control of the Croatian Revolutionary Brotherhood (HRB), which was formed in Australia in 1961. In 1963, a group of nine Australian trained HRB insurgents were captured in Yugoslavia trying unsuccessfully to foment an anti-communist insurrection. Australian authorities believed Rover was centrally involved in the organisation of this failed mission.

In that same year, Luburić officially promoted Rover to the head of the HNO in Australia. This intensified the power struggles over control of the Australian Ustaše, especially in Melbourne. For example, Rover was banned from the Croatian House in Albert Park and was stabbed with a broken bottle when he tried to gain entry to it in 1963. He was also involved in harassment, brawls and public fights over control of Ustaše finances gained from various front organisations such as the Melbourne Croatia football club and the Cardinal Stepinac Association. The priest who presided over the latter, had to call in the assistance of 12 police officers to protect him from Rover's strong-arm tactics.

By 1965, Rover had control in Australia over the HNO, HRB, CNC and another Ustaše organisation called the United Croats. Additionally, he was also an executive board member of the Melbourne Croatia football club. These groups were involved in carrying out intimidation and terrorism of Yugoslav interests in Australia during the 1960s including various beatings, bombings and shootings. Violent factional disputes within the Australian Ustaše directed toward Rover also still continued. In 1966, former HOP member Vlado Pernar attacked Rover and his wife at their electrical repair shop in Prahran with a knife. Both survived and Pernar was jailed for 3 years. During the attack, Rover's wife made a direct call to ASIO indicating a close relationship between the Rovers and the spy agency.

=== Increased extremist activity in the early 1970s ===
The Croatian Spring movement of the late 1960s combined with the assassination of HNO leader Vjekoslav Luburić in 1969, increased the nationalistic fervour amongst Croatian extremists in Australia such as Rover. Rover helped lead the memorial services for Luburić in Australia, giving eulogies at the main Croatian Catholic churches in Sydney (St Anthony's in Summer Hill) and Melbourne (St Nikola Tavelić's in Clifton Hill). In 1970, he travelled the world visiting other international members of the HNO and HRB in order to shore up support to become the next global leader of the HNO.

During the same period, the Ustaše in Australia increased the level of their attacks, orchestrating a large number of bombings and other violence on Yugoslav interests in the major cities. Similar terrorist activities were concurrently occurring overseas, including the 1971 Yugoslav Embassy shooting and the 1972 bombing of the Yugoslav airliner JAT Flight 367.

Rover was implicated in a number of these activities. In early 1972, he also started a campaign to unify all the Australian Ustaše groups into a single entity under his leadership called the Coordinating Committee of Croatian Organisations (KOHDA), and founded a new extremist newspaper called Pregled which praised the terrorists involved in the recent attacks. Rover also aggressively tried to take control of the finances of the Australian Ustaše, namely by attempting to make himself president of the Melbourne Croatia football club and use its equity to fund insurgent operations overseas. Despite causing a disturbance with 100 of his followers at a meeting of the club's executive and forcing them to resign, Rover failed to take control of Melbourne Croatia mainly due to the club being forcibly expelled from all competitions for the continual political violence displayed by its Ustaše fan base.

In April 1972, Rover travelled to overseas in an attempt to become world leader of the HNO at a conference of the terrorist group in Canada. The Australian intelligence authorities regarded this possibility as a serious threat to national security and organised for his passport to be cancelled while he was in Canada. This interfered with Rover's global terrorist leadership ambitions and he was forced to return to Australia. When he arrived back, Rover faced increased scrutiny from the authorities and the national media both due to this incident and also a series of major bombings in Sydney and Melbourne. Rover was linked to these bombings and was also implicated in the organisation of another failed Australian-trained insurgent mission to Yugoslav, called the Bugojno group.

Rover's house in Fawkner was raided by police and he faced a barrage of media attention, being interviewed by numerous newspaper and television organisations including A Current Affair and Four Corners. The federal McMahon Government, who had close links to the Ustaše in Australia, however did not cooperate in trying to arrest Rover, and actually denied that Ustaše existed in Australia.

=== Nervous breakdown and resignation ===
In early 1973, the activities of Rover and the Ustaše in Australia were made public by the Attorney-General of the newly elected Whitlam Government, Lionel Murphy. Rover and his associates were under sustained police surveillance which successfully disrupted their activities. Rover had a nervous breakdown, became suicidal and was hospitalised in a mental health ward in Melbourne. Rover subsequently resigned from all Croatian ultranationalist leadership positions.

== War criminal investigation and later life ==
Rover avoided arrest and maintained a low profile after the dramatic events of the early 1970s. However, he still managed to come under the eye of the authorities and had his passport cancelled again in 1982 due to national security concerns after he expressed support for a plan involving a Soviet Union invasion of Yugoslavia in return for partial Croatian autonomy. In 1986, he was exposed by the Nazis in Australia program on the ABC and was later investigated for war crimes during his time as an Ustaše official in the NDH, but no prosecutions were ever made.

Rover's influence as a Croatian ultra-nationalist continued into his later life, with it being claimed that in 1991 the appointed leader of the newly formed Croatian nation, Franjo Tuđman, approached Rover for advice on "security matters" in regard to supplying the new country with financial and militant support.

== Death ==
Srećko Rover died in Melbourne in 2005. He is buried in the Roman Catholic section of the Fawkner Crematorium and Memorial Park alongside his wife Vilma in the plot next to his parents, Josip and Katica.
