= Jack Mihocek =

Australian rules footballer

Personal information
- Full name: Jack Mihocek
- Born: 21 August 1957 (age 69)
- Original team: Essendon Districts
- Height: 182 cm (6 ft 0 in)
- Weight: 95 kg (209 lb)
- Position: Ruck-rover

Playing career^{1}
Years	Club	Games (Goals)
1976–78	Essendon	13 (8)
- ^{1} Playing statistics correct to the end of 1978.

Jack Mihocek (born 21 August 1957) is a former Australian rules footballer who played with Essendon in the Victorian Football League (VFL). He is the father of Brody Mihocek. He also played soccer with Yugoslavian community club Footscray JUST.
