= Brody Mihocek =

Australian rules footballer (born 1993)

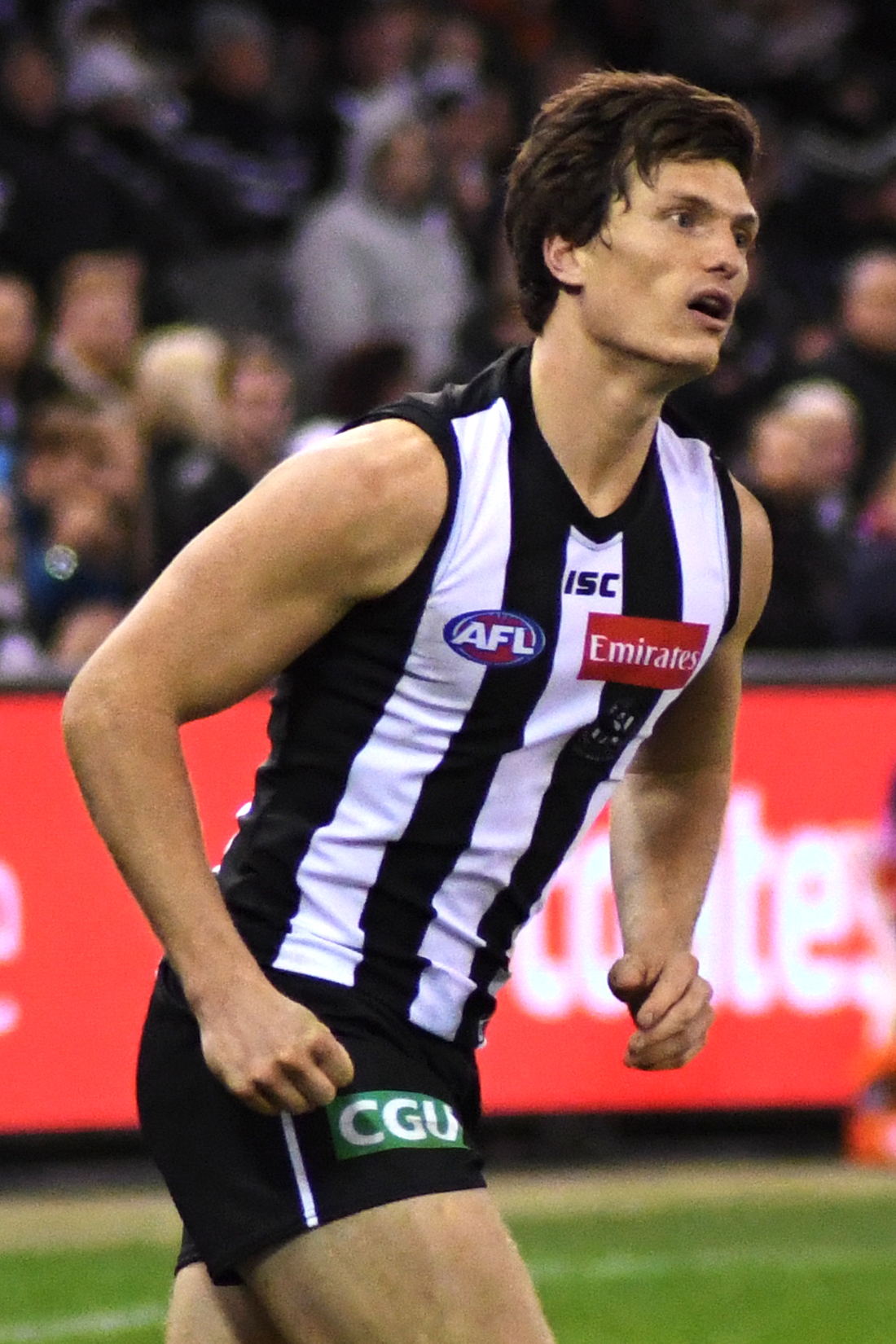
- Mihocek playing for Collingwood in August 2018

Personal information
- Nickname: Checkers
- Born: 4 February 1993 (age 33); Tasmania
- Original team: Burnie Dockers (TAS)/Port Melbourne (VFL)
- Draft: No. 22 2018 rookie draft
- Debut: Collingwood vs. Fremantle, at MCG
- Height: 192 cm (6 ft 4 in)
- Weight: 99 kg (218 lb)
- Position: Key forward

Club information
- Current club: Melbourne
- Number: 28

Playing career^{1}
Years	Club	Games (Goals)
2018–2025	Collingwood	159 (267)
2026–	Melbourne	10 (16)
Total		169 (283)
- ^{1} Playing statistics correct to the end of 2026.

Career highlights
- AFL premiership player: 2023; 5x Collingwood leading goalkicker: 2019–2023

Brody Mihocek (born 4 February 1993) is an Australian rules footballer who plays for the Melbourne Football Club in the Australian Football League (AFL). He previously played for Collingwood for eight seasons. He was selected at pick 22 in the 2017 rookie draft. He made his senior debut against Fremantle in round 11 of the 2018 season, kicking 4 goals.

Before arriving in the AFL, Mihocek played for the Burnie Dockers Football Club and the Port Melbourne Football Club.

== Early life ==
Brody Mihocek is the son of Jack Mihocek, who played for Essendon in the 1970s. He grew up in Burnie in Tasmania and attended Marist Regional College.

Mihocek played for Tasmania in the 2011 AFL Under 18 Championships, in which Tasmania were the Division 2 premiers, and was selected in the 2011 Under 18 All-Australian team at centre half-back. However he was overlooked in the 2011 AFL draft. He then played for the Burnie Dockers, and was part of their 2012 Tasmanian State League (TSL) flag, kicking a goal in the Grand Final. After this he decided to move to Melbourne and started playing with Maribyrnong Park in the Essendon District Football League (EDFL) for the 2013 season, in the hopes of securing a place in the Victorian Football League (VFL). This was successful and prior to the 2014 season he was offered a spot on the list of the VFL side Werribee.

== VFL career ==
=== 2014–2015 ===
In 2014, Mihocek signed with Victorian Football League (VFL) club Werribee for 2 seasons after looking to move on from the EDFL. He won the Player's Player award in 2014, playing in the Werribee Development side. In 2015 Mihocek was in and out of the senior team, but played in Werribee's elimination final loss to Collingwood, and was one of Werribee's best. He was also selected to play in the 2015 AFL Victoria Young Gun's game. When Werribee became aligned with AFL side North Melbourne at the end of the 2015 season, however, Mihocek sought a move to another club.

=== 2016–2017 ===
Mihocek met with Port Melbourne coach Gary Ayres in the off-season, and he crossed over to Port Melbourne for the 2016 season searching for team success. Mihocek played 33 games for Port Melbourne over 2 seasons and kicked 15 goals. He had an impressive first season and was awarded the Jack McFarlane medal for the club's best and fairest in 2016. Mihocek's 2017 season was interrupted by injury, but he returned in the second half of the season and played a key role Port Melbourne's 2017 VFL Premiership. Mihocek primarily played in defence and excelled in the role, but he was also very capable when asked to play up forward. He was looked at by several AFL clubs at the end of the 2016 season as a rookie draft selection, but it wasn't until the conclusion of the 2017 season that AFL side Collingwood contacted Mihocek and informed him that he would be selected by the club in the rookie draft, and he was ultimately selected with pick #22 as a key defender.

== AFL career ==
Mihocek primarily plays as a tall marking centre half-forward in the AFL, but he has the capacity to also play in defence; either as a key defender or loose man at the end of the game. At the forefront of Mihocek's game is a strong mark which allows him to play both ends as a tall, as well as an accurate kick. Additionally, he is also capable of floating up onto a half-forward flank or wing and play a link-up role to send the ball forward. The most notable facet of his game is his work ethic and selflessness as he is constantly running, applying pressure and leading in the forward half to present as a target.

=== 2018 ===
Collingwood had been watching Mihocek closely in the Victorian Football League (VFL), and chose him as pick 22 in the 2018 rookie draft. While he played primarily as a defender in the VFL, he made his debut as a tall forward against Fremantle in round 11 of the 2018 season to immediate effect, kicking 4 goals. He found himself a regular in Collingwood's best 22, playing every remaining game in the season, including the finals series and the Grand Final loss against West Coast where he kicked 1 goal. He finished the season with 29 goals from 16 games.

=== 2019 ===
Some other of Collingwood's forwards had injuries and suspensions; Mihocek played regularly. He received four Brownlow Medal votes throughout 2019, the first in his career.

=== 2020 ===
The reigning leading goalkicker for Collingwood, Mihocek started 2020 in top form, and he was leading the Coleman Medal during round 6 with 12 goals. However, after this Mihocek struggled with inconsistent form, as did the Magpies, and only managed 8 goals from the remaining 10 games he played in the home and away season. This poor showing was compounded after a sickening collision with Melbourne's Aaron vandenBerg in the first quarter of their round 12 match left Mihocek knocked out cold. This resulted in him missing round 13, the first time he had missed a game since his debut, putting an end to a run of 52 consecutive games. Mihocek returned to form in the first week of the 2020 Finals series with a 3-goal performance, and was Collingwood's best player in the tense final quarter, getting on top of defender Jeremy McGovern to kick 2 crucial goals, and at the end of the match moving behind the ball, cutting off West Coast inside 50's to help get Collingwood over the line. Mihocek ended the season with 25 goals from 18 games, leading Collingwood's goalkicking for the second consecutive year.

=== 2021 ===
Despite kicking 34 goals and being Collingwood's leading goalkicker for a third straight year, Mihocek, along with Collingwood struggled in 2021, as the Magpies fell from a semi-final berth in 2020 to 17th on the ladder in 2021. He kicked 34.34 for the year with an accuracy of 42.5%. Mihocek had a career-best game against the Gold Coast Suns in round 7 picking up 24 disposals, including 20 kicks, collecting 12 marks, and kicking 4.2 in a loss. He was suspended for 1 game in round 22 for a bump on Brisbane player Tom Fullarton, the first suspension in his career, and only the second time he had missed a game.

=== 2022 ===
Mihocek started the 2022 season strongly, picking up three bags of 4 goals in the first 13 rounds, though missing the round 5 match with COVID-19. This strong form coincided with a resurgent Collingwood outfit, who put a shocking 2021 season behind them to entrench themselves in the top 8. Mihocek's form peaked against reigning premiers Melbourne in round 13, where he clunked 10 marks and bagged 4 goals to drive a massive upset victory. The second half of the season saw Mihocek struggle with niggling problems and a hip injury he picked up after a contest with Mason Redman in round 19 that caused him to miss the following week. Unfortunately, his form tapered off after his return as Collingwood surged into a preliminary final, though his presence up forward to crash packs and assist teammates was still valuable. Mihocek finished the season with 41 goals, his best return, and led the Pies' goal-kicking for a fourth consecutive year.

=== 2025: Trade to Melbourne ===
Mihocek was traded to Melbourne following the 2025 AFL season.

=== 2026 ===
In round 13 of the 2026 season against Collingwood, Mihocek sustained a fracture in his neck that required surgery and was ruled out for the rest of the season.

== Statistics ==
Updated to the end of round 22, 2026.

Legend
G	Goals	K	Kicks	D	Disposals	T	Tackles
B	Behinds	H	Handballs	M	Marks
#	Played in that season's premiership team

Season	Team	No.	Games	Totals							Averages (per game)							Votes
Season	Team	No.	Games	G	B	K	H	D	M	T	G	B	K	H	D	M	T	Votes
2018	Collingwood	41	16	29	18	127	58	185	79	33	1.8	1.1	7.9	3.6	11.6	4.9	2.1	0
2019	Collingwood	41	24	36	26	213	102	315	141	49	1.5	1.1	8.9	4.3	13.1	5.9	2.0	4
2020 (Note: The 2020 season was played with 17 home-and-away matches per team (down from 22) and 16-minute quarters with time on (down from 20-minute quarters with time on) due to the impact of the COVID-19 pandemic.)	Collingwood	41	18	25	9	110	48	158	68	33	1.4	0.5	6.1	2.7	8.8	3.8	1.8	5
2021	Collingwood	41	21	34	34	178	50	228	123	35	1.6	1.6	8.5	2.4	10.9	5.9	1.7	0
2022	Collingwood	41	23	41	25	150	65	215	87	46	1.8	1.1	6.5	2.8	9.3	3.8	2.0	3
2023^{#}	Collingwood	41	24	47	26	189	60	249	114	44	2.0	1.1	7.9	2.5	10.4	4.8	1.8	5
2024	Collingwood	41	11	19	13	78	36	114	41	29	1.7	1.2	7.1	3.3	10.4	3.7	2.6	0
2025	Collingwood	41	22	36	28	147	64	211	83	55	1.6	1.3	6.7	2.9	9.6	3.8	2.5	0
2026	Melbourne	28	10	16	7	57	14	71	39	11	1.6	0.7	5.7	1.4	7.1	3.9	1.1	0
Career			169	283	186	1249	497	1746	775	335	1.7	1.1	7.4	2.9	10.3	4.6	2.0	17

== Honours and achievements ==
Team

- AFL premiership player 2023 (Collingwood)
- AFL Minor Premiership 2023 (Collingwood)

Individual

- 5× Collingwood Leading Goalkicker Award: 2019 (36), 2020 (25), 2021 (34), 2022 (41), 2023 (47)
- Bob Rose Award (Collingwood Best player in Finals): 1 (2020)
