= Croatian Revolutionary Brotherhood =

Croatian separatist terrorist organisation

- Hrvatsko Revolucionarno Bratstvo
- Founder: Geza Pashti
- Founded: September 1961, Sydney, Australia
- Country: Australia; Yugoslavia
- Group: Bugojno group
- Flag

The Croatian Revolutionary Brotherhood (CRB) (Croatian: Hrvatsko Revolucionarno Bratstvo or HRB) was an Australian-based Croatian separatist terrorist organisation.

The organisation was established by four Croatian emigres: Jure Maric, Ilija Tolic, Josip Oblak, and Geza Pasti. The organisation carried out terrorist actions in Europe and Australia. The organisation was active throughout the territory of Yugoslavia in the early and mid-1960s. Its aim was to start an uprising in Yugoslavia and to establish an independent Croatia. This mission failed due to the intervention of the State Security Administration, Yugoslav secret police.

== Actions ==
- Action Kangaroo (July 1963) The objective was to focus on the Croatian villages and provincial enterprises in northern Yugoslavia, spreading anti-Communist propaganda and promoting civil unrest.
- Belgrade cinema bombing in 1968
- Belgrade train station bombing in 1968
- Uprising attempt in Bugojno, 1972
- Action Kaktus; a sabotage attempt on the 1975 tourist season

== Notable members ==
Some notable CRB members were:

- Jure Maric
- Ilija Tolic
- Josip Oblak
- Adolf Andrić
- Ilija Glavas
- Blaž Kraljević
- Geza Pašti
- Josip Senić

These people were also members of Ante Pavelić's Croatian Liberation Movement (HOP) but they left that organisation because they decided they would not achieve their goals through the political route.

UDBA, the Yugoslav secret police, attempted to curb the group's terrorist activities by engaging in covert assassinations of its members. Geza Pašti was killed in Nice in 1965, and Marijan Šimundić was killed in Stuttgart in 1967.

The CRB/HRB's motto was: "Život za Hrvatsku" ["Life for Croatia"].

== See also ==
- Croatian National Resistance
- Croatian Revolution Hackers

== Bibliography ==
- Adriano, Pino; Cingolani, Giorgio (2018). "Epilogue The Question of the Ustasha between Yugoslavia and the Vatican, 1952–72". Nationalism and Terror: Ante Pavelić and Ustasha Terrorism from Fascism to the Cold War. Budapest; New York: Central European University Press. pp. 409–436. doi:10.7829/j.ctv4cbhsr. ISBN 978-963-386-206-3. JSTOR 10.7829/j.ctv4cbhsr. OCLC 8182808968.
- Koschade, Stuart (2009). "The Croatian Revolutionary Brotherhood: Action Kangaroo". In Brawley, Sean (ed.). Doomed to Repeat: Terrorism and the Lessons of History. Washington DC: New Academic Publishing. pp. 227–303. ISBN 9780981865492.
- Koschade, Stuart (2007). The Internal Dynamics of Terrorist Cells: A Social Network Analysis of Terrorist Cells in an Australian Context (PhD thesis). Queensland University of Technology.
- Cottle, Drew; Keys, Angela (2022). "Fascism in Exile: Ustasha-Linked Organisations in Australia". In Smith, Evan; Persian, Jane; Fox, Vashti Jane (eds.). Histories of Fascism and Anti-Fascism in Australia. London: Routledge. doi:10.4324/9781003120964-7. ISBN 978-1-003-12096-4.
- Tokić, Mate Nikola (2020). Croatian Radical Separatism and Diaspora Terrorism During the Cold War. West Lafayette, Indiana: Purdue University Press. ISBN 9781557538918.
