= Croatian National Council =

Representative body of Croatian emigrants

The Croatian National Council (Croatian: Hrvatsko narodno vijeće, HNV) was a representative body of Croatian emigrant groups which operated from 1974 to the nation's independence in 1991.

At the Croatian Parliament held in Chicago from November 23 to November 25, 1973 it was decided that a global body, representing groups calling for Croatian independence, would be formed in Toronto, Canada from February 1 to February 3, 1974.

The conference was held as planned. All major Croatian political parties and organizations, as well as many small ones, were represented except for the Croatian Peasant Party and the Croatian Liberation Movement. The Croatian National Council was officially formed here, and elected Ante Došen as president.

The HNV held its first Parliament in September 1975, again in Toronto, where Dinko Šuljak was elected its premier. The second Parliament was in Brussels in 1977, which met with wide protest by Yugoslav officials. At this conference, Bruno Bušić was elected into the HNV's Parliament and served in it until his assassination by Yugoslav secret police in 1978.

In January 1980 the third Parliament was held in London. At this conference former Independent State of Croatia (NDH) minister Vjekoslav Vrančić arrived from Buenos Aires to speak about how the HNV should not rely on the tradition of the NDH to deal with forming a new independent Croatian state. Moderates performed especially well at this Parliament's elections. Parliaments followed in 1982 in Toronto and 1984 in London.

The Croatian National Council met again every two years until its final two Parliaments in 1990. The first was held on schedule, while the second was a special Parliament which saw the HNV de facto disband itself after the first democratic elections in Croatia.

== Presidents ==
- Stanko Vujica (1975–1976)
- Janko Skrbin (1976–1982)
- Mate Meštrović (1982–1990)
