= Terrorism in Yugoslavia =

This article includes information on terrorist acts and groups in or against the Kingdom of Yugoslavia (1918–45) and Federal Yugoslavia (1945–92). Many of the terrorist acts were carried out outside Yugoslavia against Yugoslav subjects. The post-war period until circa 1985 was marked by frequent terrorist attacks on Yugoslav institutions organized by extremist emigrant organizations. Between 1962 and 1982, they carried out 128 terrorist attacks against Yugoslav civilian and military targets.

== Socialist Yugoslavia ==
=== Ustaše terrorism ===
Ustaše terrorism continued over the years after Ante Pavelić's death. The Croatian Liberation Movement (HOP) conducted several assassinations and attacks on Yugoslav diplomacy and JAT representations in Australia. Between 1962 and 1982, Croatian nationalists carried out 128 terror attacks against Yugoslav civilian and military targets. Croat fascist and HSO member Miljenko Hrkać carried out the bombing of a Belgrade cinema in September 1968, leaving one dead and 85 wounded. In 1969, two Yugoslav diplomats in Western Germany were shot and wounded by Ustaše assassins. In 1970, Yugoslav secretary Vladimir Rolović handed over information on Ustaše and their involvement in terrorist actions to the Australian government (which had tolerated and even trained the Ustaše). The following year, two Ustaše youngsters murdered Rolović while he was the ambassador to Sweden. In January 1972 a JAT plane was bombed allegedly by Croatian ultranationalist agents, killing everyone on board except for one survivor, Vesna Vulović. The crackdown on the Croatian leadership led to heightened anti-Yugoslav activity by Croat emigrant groups. On 29 March 1972 a Yugoslav tourist office was bombed in Stockholm. The last members of the Bugojno group were captured, tried and sentenced on 21 December 1972.

=== Chetnik terrorism ===
In 1975, Nikola Kavaja, a diaspora Chetnik-sympathizer living in Chicago and belonging to the Serbian National Defense Council (SNDC), was responsible for the bombing of a Yugoslav consul's home, the first in a series of attacks targeting the Yugoslav state in the United States and Canada. He and his co-conspirators were captured in a sting set up by the Federal Bureau of Investigation and convicted for terrorism for the incident and for planning to bomb two Yugoslav receptions on Yugoslavia's National Day. Later that year, during his flight to receive his sentence, he hijacked the American Airlines Flight 293 with the intention of crashing the plane into Tito's Belgrade headquarters, but was dissuaded; he ultimately received a 67-year prison sentence.

== Events ==
=== Kingdom of Yugoslavia (1918–41) ===
- Assassination of Alexander I of Yugoslavia, 9 October 1934, by IMRO assassin, organized with Ustaše help.

=== Federal Yugoslavia (1945–92) ===
- Plot to assassinate Josip Broz Tito, 1967, by HRB.
- Belgrade cinema bombing, 13 July 1968, at 21.05 CET, a bomb detonated in the Belgrade cinema "20. oktobar". One person was killed and 85 injured, some seriously. The bomb was placed under the sixth seat of the 16th row, during the movie Risifi u Panami, allegedly by HOP and HRB member Miljenko Hrkać.
- Murder of Yugoslav secretary Vladimir Rolović by members of the Croatian National Resistance terrorist organization.
- JAT Flight 367, 26 January 1972, bomb exploded during flight, 27 out of 28 dead (Vesna Vulović survived), allegedly by Croatian nationalists.
- Bugojno group attacks, 20 June–24 July 1972, by HRB.
- Hijacking of Scandinavian Airlines System Flight 130, 15–16 September 1972, by HNO.
- Hijacking of TWA Flight 355, September 10 1976, by Croatian nationalists.
- New York–Chicago plane hijack, 1979, Boeing 727 with 135 passengers hijacked by Serb emigrant and anti-communist (Chetnik) Nikola Kavaja. Arrested and sentenced to 20 years.

== Groups ==
- Internal Macedonian Revolutionary Organisation (IMRO), est. 1920, Macedonian Bulgarian
- Crusaders, est. 1945, neo-Ustaše terrorist group.
- Croatian Liberation Movement (HOP), est. 1956, Croatian right-wing ultranationalist group.
- Croatian National Resistance (HNO), est. 1957, Croatian right-wing ultranationalist group.
- Croatian Revolutionary Brotherhood (HRB), est. 1961, Croatian right-wing ultranationalist group
  - Bugojno group, est. 1972 by HRB

== Notable people ==
- Miljenko Hrkać, HOP
- Miro Barešić, HNO

== See also ==
- Terrorism in Bosnia and Herzegovina
- Terrorism in Croatia
- Terrorism in Kosovo
- Terrorism in Serbia
- Terrorism in Slovenia

== Sources ==
- Bieber, Florian (2003). "Approaches to political violence and terrorism in former Yugoslavia". Journal of Southern Europe and the Balkans. 5 (1): 39–51. doi:10.1080/1461319032000062642. S2CID 149208701.
- Brown, Gregory Scott (December 2004). "Coping with Long-distance Nationalism: Inter-ethnic Conflict in a Diaspora Context" (PDF). The University of Texas at Austin. Archived from the original (PDF) on 20 December 2016.
- Clissold, Stephen (1979). Croat Separatism: Nationalism, Dissidence, and Terrorism. Institute for the Study of Conflict.
- Cvetković, Srđan (2014). "Terorizam i jugoslovenska politička emigracija". Istorija 20. Veka. 2 (2/2014): 171–197. doi:10.29362/ist20veka.2014.2.cve.171-198.
- Čubrić, Milan (1990). Između noža i križa. Književne novine. ISBN 9788639101916.
- Hockenos, Paul (2003). Homeland Calling: Exile Patriotism & the Balkan Wars. Cornell University Press. pp. 62–. ISBN 0-8014-4158-7.
- Johnstone, Diana (2002). Fools' Crusade: Yugoslavia, Nato, and Western Delusions. NYU Press. ISBN 978-1-58367-084-2.
- Pluchinsky, Dennis (2010). "Ethnic Terrorism: Themes and Variations". In Tan, Andrew T.H. (ed.). Politics of Terrorism: A Survey. London: Routledge. ISBN 978-1-13683-336-6.
- Sadkovich, James J. (1988). "Terrorism in Croatia, 1929-1934". East European Quarterly. 22 (1): 55–.
- West, Richard (2012). Tito and the Rise and Fall of Yugoslavia. Faber & Faber. ISBN 978-0-571-28110-7.
