= 1971 Yugoslav Embassy shooting =

Terrorist attack by Croatian separatists

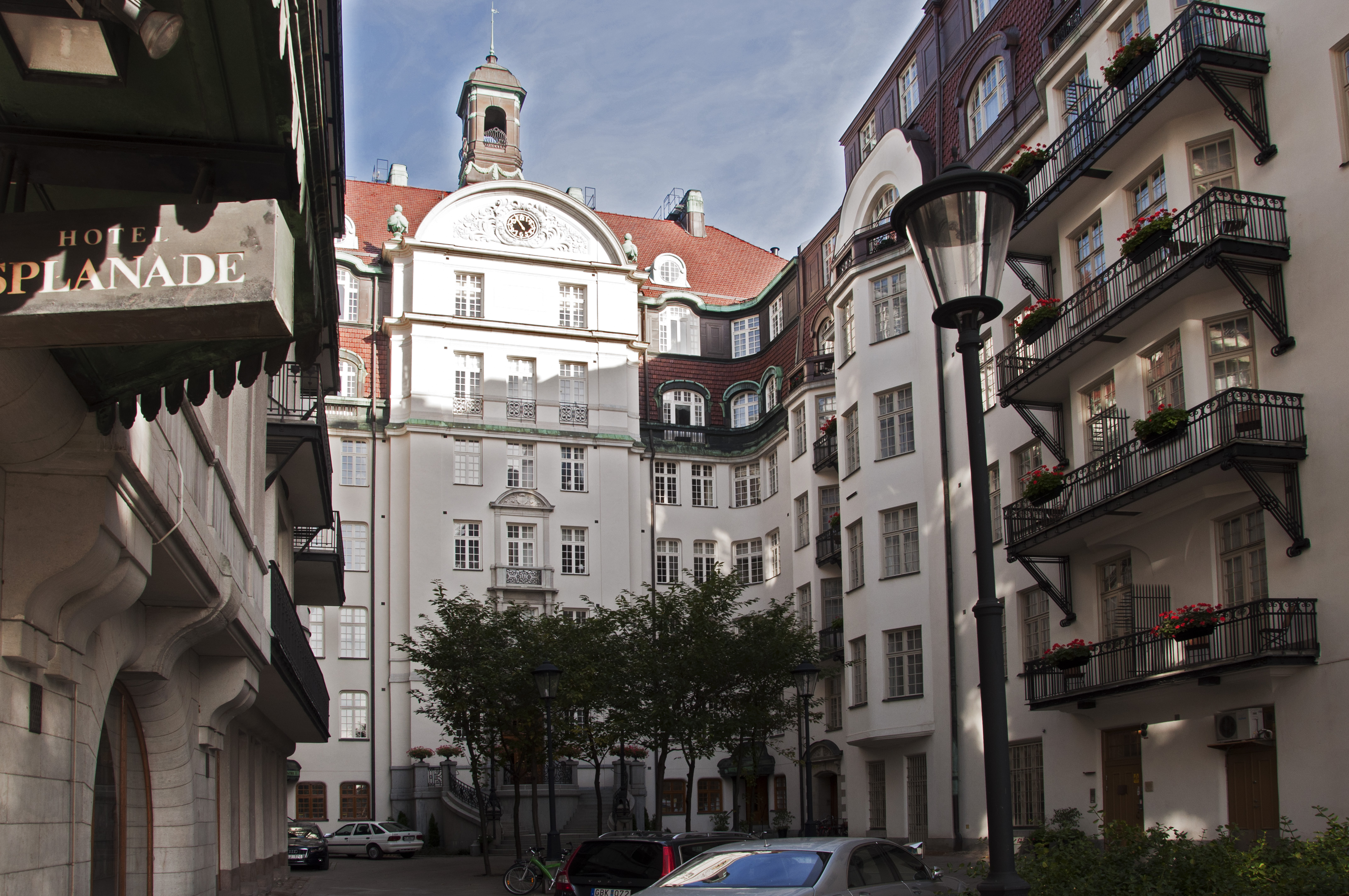
- Strandvägen 7B where the shooting took place
- Location: 59.332485°N 18.080624°E; Embassy of Yugoslavia, Strandvägen 7B, Stockholm, Sweden
- Date: 7 April 1971
- Target: Vladimir Rolović
- Weapon: Pistol
- Deaths: 1 (Rolović)
- Injuries: 2
- Assailants: Miro Barešić, Anđelko Brajković, Ante Stojanov, Marinko Lemo, Stanislav Milićević
- Motive: Revenge for the murder of Vjekoslav Luburić

The 1971 Yugoslav Embassy shooting was a terrorist attack carried out by Croatian separatists affiliated with the Ustaše movement. It occurred on 7 April 1971, at the embassy of the Socialist Federal Republic of Yugoslavia in Stockholm, Sweden. Among the victims was Vladimir Rolović, the ambassador, who was shot by the attackers, and died a week later.

== Background ==
On 10 February 1971, two Yugoslav men entered the Yugoslav Consulate in Gothenburg. They gathered and restrained all the Consulate staff on the premises, at knife and gunpoint. The two men, Blago Mikulić and Ivan Vujičević, demanded that the Yugoslav authorities release the convicted bomber Miljenko Hrkać, who was imprisoned in Yugoslavia and that he be brought to the Franco-controlled Spain with $20,000 in his pocket. If the demands were not met, the employees of the consulate would be executed. After just over one day's siege and fruitless negotiations with the Swedish police, they gave up and were arrested.

Mikulić and Vujičević, who belonged to the organisation "Jadran", or the Black Legion, were later sentenced to three and a half years in prison. The Yugoslav ambassador to Stockholm, Vladimir Rolović, criticised the Swedish police in the media and saying they did not take the terrorist threat seriously enough, claiming that the Croatian separatists belonged to Ustaše, an organization that collaborated with Nazi Germany during World War II. The assailants were then popularly called Ustaše.

== Events ==
A few months later, on 7 April 1971, at the Yugoslav Embassy on Strandvägen 7B in Stockholm, Miro Barešić and Anđelko Brajković penetrated the building and took ambassador Vladimir Rolović (a former OZNA colonel) hostage. He was struck across the face with a pistol and dragged into his room. The men tied Rolović to a chair, pulled a leather belt around his neck and shot him in the face and stomach. Several shots were fired, one penetrated a door and injured the embassy secretary, Mira Stempilhar. One of the men urinated on his hands to clean off Rolovic's blood, the other threw a portrait of Tito through the window. An embassy officer who tried to escape through a window was taken to the hospital. When the police arrived, they immediately stormed the building and forced the terrorists to surrender. The ambassador, fatally wounded, was lying in a pool of blood on the floor. Barešić and Brajković stood in a corner with their hands in the air. On their way out of the building, they shouted "Long live the Independent State of Croatia" and "long live Ante Pavelić". Barešić and Brajković said they belong to Ustaše and also proclaimed that he wanted to punish Rolović for his visit to Canberra, Australia, where he was sent by the Yugoslav Foreign Ministry to inform the Australian Government of the Ustaše members who prepared terrorist actions in Yugoslavia from its territory.

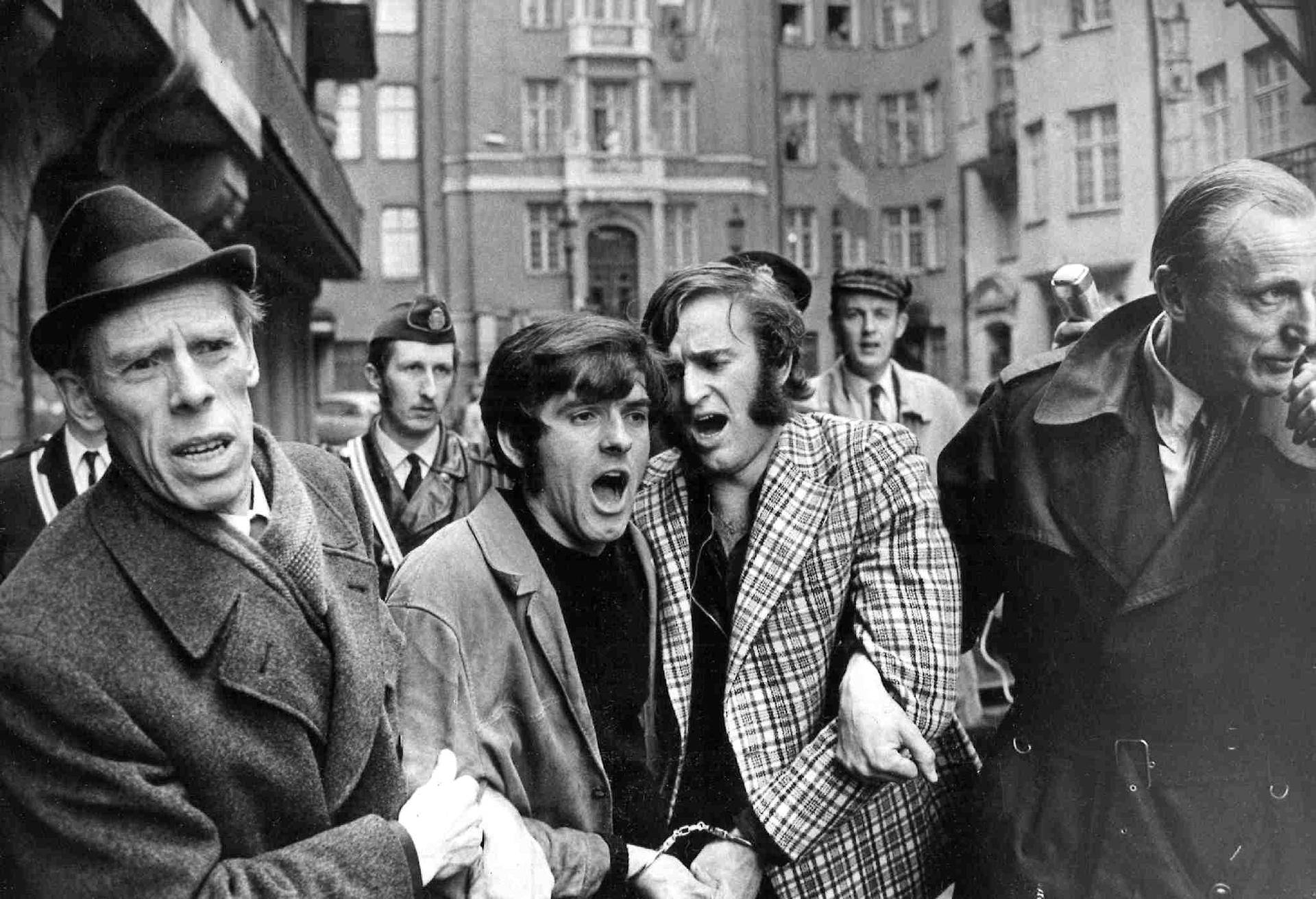
The shooters were apprehended by the police

Rolović died a week later without regaining consciousness at Karolinska Hospital. The Yugoslav secret service has always maintained that Ante Stojanov, who was convicted by Stockholm District Court for complicity to murder, was, in fact, the mastermind behind the attack and aircraft hijacking, which Stojanov later admitted. He supervised the operation from a bar on Strandvägen. Ante Stojanov, was convicted of complicity to the murder of the Yugoslav ambassador, while his then twenty-year-old cousin Miro Barešić along with Anđelko Brajković were convicted to life imprisonment. Stojanov and the other two assailants, Marinko Lemo and Stanislav Miličević, was sentenced in the same trial to between two and four years in prison and deportation. The Swedish government was now under heavy pressure. The Yugoslav President Josip Broz Tito immediately sent his Deputy Foreign Minister to Sweden. A furious Milorad Pešić was met at the airport by the State Secretary Thage G. Peterson. During the journey towards Stockholm and the waiting Prime Minister Olof Palme, a shocked Peterson were told how the Deputy Minister demanded that the arrested should be cut into pieces. He wanted them to be executed in Sweden as soon as possible or at least to be taken to Yugoslavia to be killed.

The Swedish police investigation in 1971 had failed to uncover that the kidnapping of Rolović was not the goal of the attack on the Yugoslav Embassy. The Swedish-Croatian journalist Tonči Percan showed, after a thorough examination of the archive material in Stockholm 45 years later, and after talking with the mastermind behind the attack Ante Stojanov, that it really was an act of revenge. Rolović was to be executed. In 1969, the Yugoslavian agent Ilija Stanić had murdered the Ustaše general Vjekoslav Luburić in Spain. After World War II, Luburić had fled to Spain, where he was active in the Croatian National Resistance, and the State Security Administration (UDBA) pursued an intensive search for Croatian nationalists around the world. The attack in Stockholm was a revenge for the murder of Luburić. Before Rolović was murdered, Barešić had placed a photo of Ilija Stanić on the ambassador's desk; It was a message to UDBA and Tito that revenge was completed.

== Aftermath ==
The first, and so far only, aircraft hijacking in Sweden, that of the Scandinavian Airlines System Flight 130 took place at Bulltofta Airport on 15 September 1972. It was hijacked in order to demand that the six Croats who were imprisoned for the murder of Yugoslav ambassador Rolović in Stockholm in 1971 be released. The aircraft hijacking was already planned before the attack on the Yugoslav Embassy. Stojanov said in an interview in 2004 that if they were to get caught, their comrades would get them free by hijacking an airplane.

Three Croatian men, Tomislav Rebrina (36), Nicola Lisac (44) and Rudolf Prskalo (29), from the fascist Ustaše movement held 86 passengers and 4 crew members hostage. In the end, six of the detained terrorists who were taken to Malmö were exchanged for hostages to be released. The hijackers also received SEK 500,000. A seventh of those involved in the ambassador's murder refused to come along. The plane took off and flew to Madrid. The hijackers and their comrades were arrested and received extremely symbolic punishments - rather protection - in Spain which was then under an authoritarian regime led by Francisco Franco. They were eventually released and scattered across the world. Some returned to Croatia in connection with the breakup of Yugoslavia.

After the release from a Spanish prison, Barešić lived a flattering life for several years. He worked for a couple of years under a false name as a bodyguard for Paraguay's president Alfredo Stroessner. When he arrived in the United States in 1979, he was disclosed and extradited to Sweden. Again, he created headlines when he repeatedly went on hunger strike to get his life sentence timed and avoid solitary confinement. In 1985, the sentence was converted to 18 years in prison and in 1987 Barešić was able to leave Österåker Prison where he served his last time of the sentence. He was deported from Sweden to Paraguay. From there he finally returned to Croatia. Barešić was killed in action in July 1991, but the Croatian government kept his death secret for over a year so that the morale of the Croatian Army would not sink. He was appointed posthumously either to general or to major. Anđelko Brajković also returned to Croatia and retired as a colonel after the war.

Both in connection with the murder of ambassador Rolović and after the aircraft hijacking, the diplomatic situation between Sweden and Yugoslavia was tense. Many Yugoslavians argued that the Swedish government should never have released the Croatian terrorists. The two attacks also caused great concern among the many Yugoslav immigrants in Sweden. However, as a result of the murder of Rolovic, the punishment for unlawful weapons possession and arms crimes in Sweden was tightened. In 1973, the much talked about terrorist law was passed, which gave the Swedish Security Service (Säpo) greater authority. Among other things, Säpo was now able to legally bug suspects phones and open their mail. The law also gave Säpo the right to expel a foreign citizen "with regard to what is known about the foreigner's previous activities".

Stojanov told an interviewer in 2004 that he considered the ambassador's murder and aircraft hijacking as the start of the Croatian struggle for independence.

== See also ==
- Scandinavian Airlines System Flight 130
