= Scandinavian Airlines System Flight 130 =

1972 aircraft hijacking

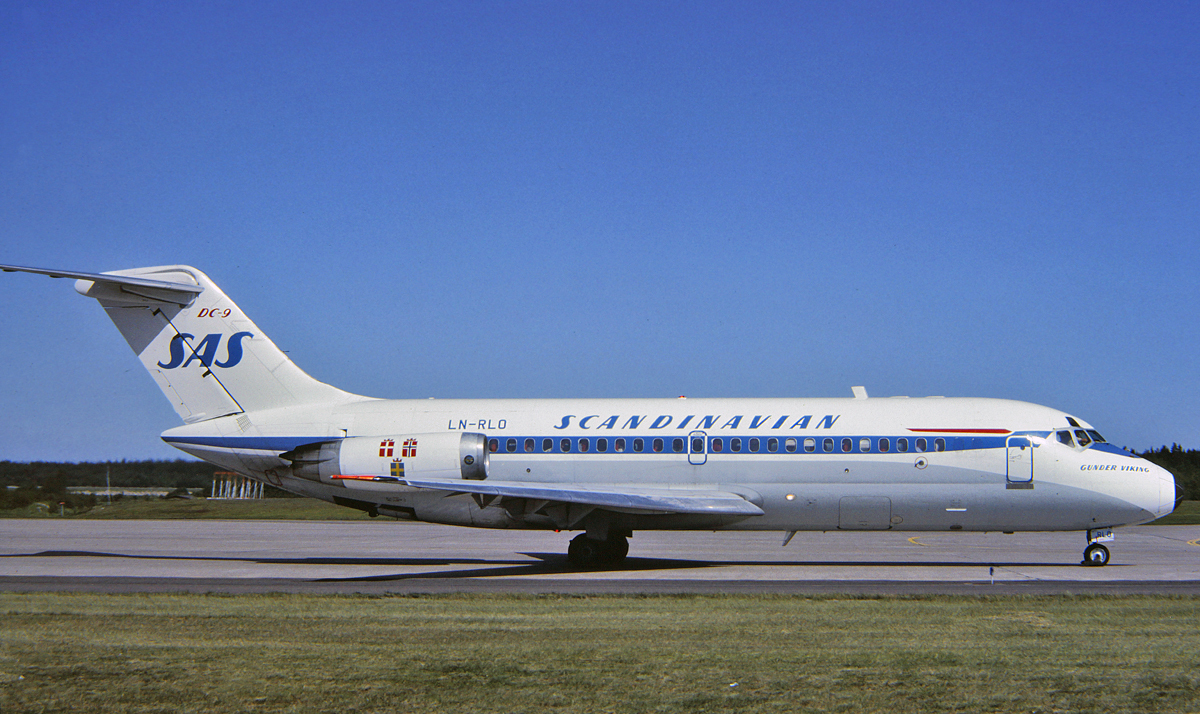
- LN-RLO, the aircraft involved in the hijacking, photographed in 1983

Hijacking
- Date: 15–16 September 1972
- Summary: Hijacking
- Site: Bulltofta Airport, Malmö, Sweden; 55°36′18″N 13°3′35″E

Aircraft
- Aircraft type: McDonnell Douglas DC-9-21
- Aircraft name: Gunder Viking
- Operator: Scandinavian Airlines System
- Registration: LN-RLO
- Flight origin: Torslanda Airport, Gothenburg
- Destination: Stockholm Arlanda Airport
- Passengers: 86
- Crew: 4
- Fatalities: 0
- Injuries: 0
- Survivors: 90

Scandinavian Airlines System Flight 130 was an aircraft hijacking which took place in Sweden and subsequently Spain on 15 and 16 September 1972. While en route from Torslanda Airport in Gothenburg to Stockholm Arlanda Airport, three armed members of the Croatian National Resistance (CNR) forcibly took control of the McDonnell Douglas DC-9-21 aircraft and redirected it to Bulltofta Airport in Malmö. There was a crew of four and eighty-six passengers on the Scandinavian Airlines System aircraft.

Upon arriving at Bulltofta at 17:14, the hijackers demanded the release of seven members of their group, which had been sentenced for the 1971 occupation of the Consulate-General of Yugoslavia in Gothenburg and shooting at the Embassy of Yugoslavia in Stockholm, including Miro Barešić. They threatened to otherwise detonate a bomb. Negotiations followed throughout the evening, night and morning. Six of the seven prisoners agreed to the transfer and were boarded at 04:00. Only a third of the hostages were released and new negotiations followed. All passengers were eventually released in exchange for SEK 500,000.

The aircraft then left for Madrid–Barajas Airport in Spain. There the aircraft was surrounded by the police and the crew released. The hijackers surrendered at 14:47 and spent a year in prison in Spain. The hijacking was decisive for the Parliament of Sweden passing the new Terrorism Act in 1973.

== Background ==
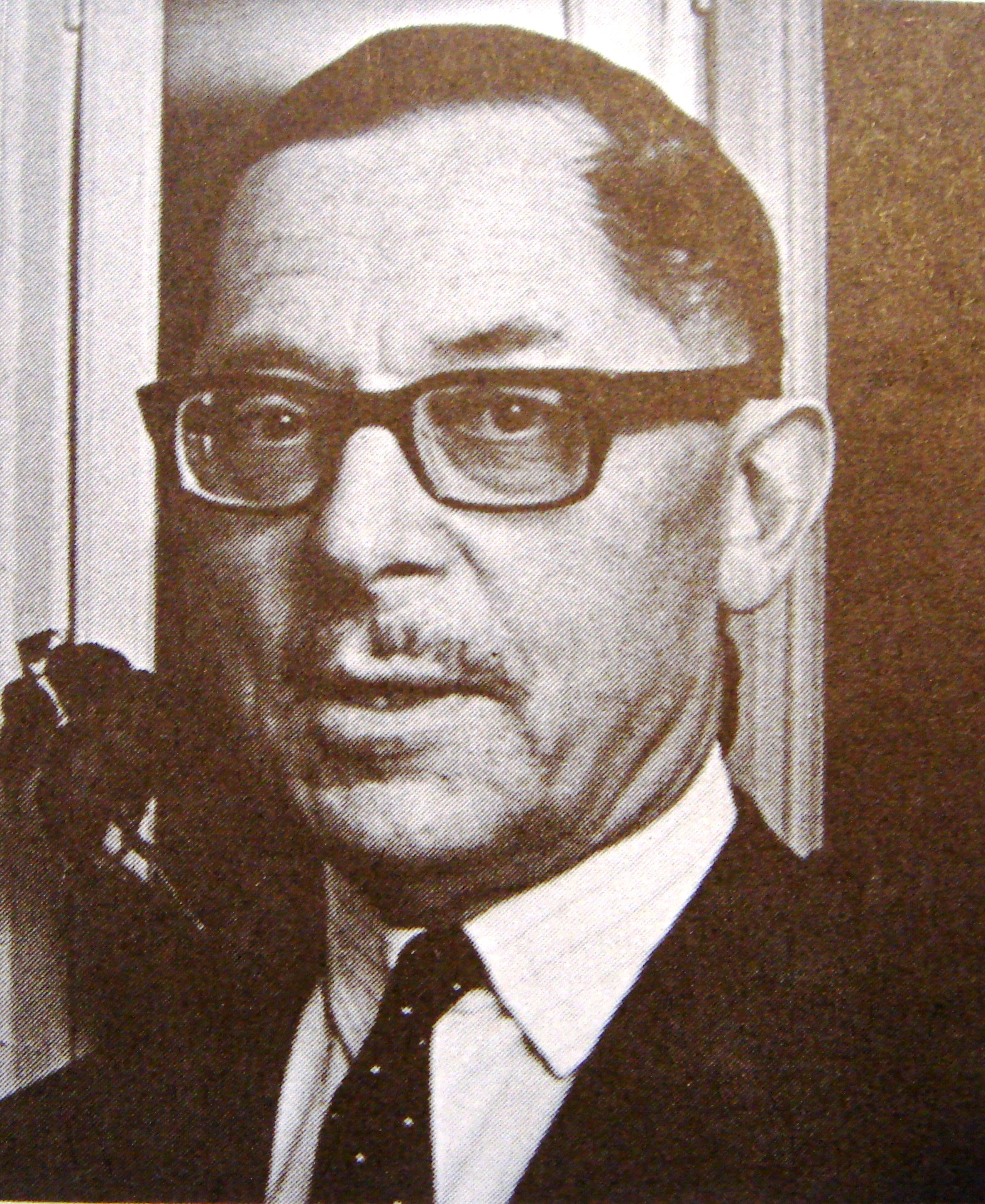
Lennart Geijer served as Minister of Justice during the incident

Two Croatians occupied the Consulate-General of Yugoslavia in Gothenburg on 10 and 11 February 1971, demanding that a Croatian separatist be released from prison in Yugoslavia. After about twenty-four hours, they surrendered without their goals having been met. They were tried by Swedish courts and sentenced to prison. The ambassador of Yugoslavia stated inaccurately that they were part of the Ustaše, a prejudicial term which has since stuck in the Swedish coverage and debate.

The Embassy of Yugoslavia was compromised by two Croatians on 7 April 1971, whereby two Croatians shot Ambassador Vladimir Rolović and wounded a secretary. They were caught and, along with three others who had participated in the planning, were sentenced to prison. The two who broke in were sentenced to life imprisonment for murder. The various participants were sentenced in different prisons. The Government of Yugoslavia demanded that the murderers be sent to Yugoslavia where they could be executed. The issue spurred a political debate concerning terrorism, but it remained at a calm level and was mostly concerned with increased penalties for illegal possession of arms and the possibility of deporting terrorists after their prison sentences were concluded.

Already before the attacks on the diplomatic mission, the hijacking was planned by the group as a resort should they be arrested. The three hijackers, aged 35, 40 and 29, lived off welfare in Gothenburg. They supplemented their income through extorting money from fellow Croatians in Gothenburg, claiming that anyone not paying them was an enemy of Croatia. The 29-year-old was previously sentenced for a robbery and several other violent crimes against both Swedes and Serbs.

== Hijacking ==
=== Bulltofta ===
Flight 130 was a domestic scheduled service from Torslanda Airport in Gothenburg to Stockholm Arlanda Airport. On board were a crew of 4 and 86 passengers. A few minutes after the aircraft departed at 16:30, two of the hijackers made their way to the cockpit. They pointed their guns at a flight attendant and demanded that the aircraft divert to Bulltofta Airport in Malmö. The pilots followed the orders. The pilot released the hijacking alert at 16:51 and the aircraft landed at Bulltofta at 17:10.

The incident was largely met with disbelief and laughter from the passengers and some of the flight attendants, as they thought it was an exercise. Passengers described two of the hijackers as calm and with a good comprehension of Swedish, while one was clearly nervous and did not understand Swedish. The hijackers calmly answered questions regarding the action and stated that they intended to have the ambassador's murderer released. They then started making references to the Munich massacre ten days earlier and hinted that a similar situation could arise in the aircraft. Passengers described the hijackers as generally friendly.

Once at Bulltofta, the Croatians demanded the release of the seven Croatians sentenced after the attacks on the diplomatic missions. In addition, they required that they be allowed free passage out of Sweden for themselves and the prisoners. They made it clear that their intention was to detonate a bomb they had with them if the authorities did not meet their demands within eight hours. At 17:30 one passenger was permitted to leave for medical reasons. At 17:45 the hijackers threatened to detonate their bomb as there were photographers on the runway. Another three passengers were released for medical reasons at 19:00. The passengers were starved until about 20:00, when supplies of food and drink were provided to the aircraft.

The police were informed of the hijacking at 16:55 and immediately scrambled troops to Bulltofta to deal with the situation. Organised by the police superintendent on duty in Malmö, a low-profile police action was ordered, where no police officer should attempt any offensive action without prior orders. Minister of Justice Lennart Geijer was alerted at 18:20. He was vacationing at his cabin in Ystad Municipality, located only kilometers from the airport, and was able to quickly arrive at the scene. Once briefed, he called a cabinet conference by alerting Prime Minister Olof Palme. Meanwhile, the National Police Board dispatched several of its members to the airport. Its leader, Carl Persson, joined the crisis cabinet. They decided to avoid the use of force and instead attempt to tire out the hijackers through extending negotiations.

Bulltofta was partially evacuated and the international departure area was converted to an emergency ward. Ten busloads of stretchers and medical equipment were brought in and set up in case of a detonation. At 21:00 a SAS Douglas DC-9 departed Bromma with the SAS executive management along with a reserve crew for a DC-9. Half an hour later Lund University Hospital was put in full emergency preparedness. Additional food supplies were handed over at 22:00.

The first major decision for the authorities was whether the prisoners should be released. Palme gave the orders for preliminary release at 21:00. The cabinet met at 22:00 and by 23:00 it had concluded that the prisoners were to be transported to Bulltofta as an intermediate measure. There were at the time rumors that the terrorists were Serbs who had the intention of murdering the Croatians once they were on board the aircraft. The cabinet therefore decided that the prisoners would only be let on board if they agreed to themselves, after consulting with the hijackers. However, the issue was complicated around midnight when the Bulltofta base of operations received a threat by telefax which threatened to kill Palme, Geijer and two other ministers if the prisoners were handed over.

There were several instances of photographers and other making their way onto the runway. This irritated the hijackers and the runway was cleared. New attempts were made to reach the runway and new clearings were carried out. All other aviation activity at Bulltofta ceased at 23:55. Fifteen minutes later two more passengers were let off due to heart problems. One recovered quickly after receiving medication, while the other was sent to hospital. The prisoners arrived at the airport between 01:35 and 02:10, having been transported by a Douglas DC-3 and two helicopters from their respective prisons.

The prisoners were informed of the situation and the demands. At this time it was still not evident whether the two groups were friends or foes. As the only prisoner, Barešić stated at 02:12 that he was interested in letting the transaction take place without talking to the hijackers. Others talked to the hijackers, but they did not agree to the transfer. Barešić thereafter convinced all but one of them to accept the deal. Planning the practical aspects of the transaction was forcing the issue past the deadline. This was finalised at 03:02 when it was decided that the dissident would not be exchanged. Under command of Superintendent Lewijn, 30 passengers would be released after which two prisoners would be sent by police escort to the aircraft and let on board. This would be done three times until all passengers were safe and all willing prisoners aboard, with the cabin crew being let off in the last wave.

The hijackers responded to the offer by demanding that all passengers be on board until all the prisoners were; otherwise the aircraft would be blown up. The police management was of the opinion that this was a valid threat. The cabinet was informed, and after considerations the police offered that half the hostages be released, then half the prisoners would be let on board and then the procedure repeated once more. The hijackers responded that they would accept that half the passengers be released when three prisoners were on board. After consultations this was accepted by the police.

The first transaction took place at the agreed-upon time of 04:00. Three prisoners were let aboard the aircraft and 30 passengers were let out. The final three prisoners were let aboard at 04:05. However, the remaining passengers were kept on board and instead the hijackers demanded that the aircraft be fueled before any more releases. This was accepted by Geijer at 04:08. The situation was not well received by the cabinet. Also, the six new prisoners were able to take over command of the situation on the aircraft, replacing the weary hijackers. Refueling took place at 04:48. They then demanded one million Swedish krona to release further hostages. Negotiations followed, whereby the police argued that acquiring such amounts of cash would be difficult in the middle of the night, and the hijackers reduced their demand to half a million. The police further argued that a rested flight crew would be at the advantage of the hijackers.

The county governor requested from the bank director of Kreditbanken for the money at 05:45, who responded that the money could be delivered at the earliest at 07:30. This was relayed to the hijackers at 06:56, who stated that they would continue to wait for the money. It arrived at 07:29 and negotiations started concerning how the money be handed over. The police demanded release of hostages first, which the hijackers refused. At the time the police were mostly concerned about the threat of the aircraft flying to a foreign location rather than it being blown up in Malmö. The engines were started up and departure procedures commenced. A new offer came from the hijackers and between 08:28 and 08:35 the exchange of passengers and money took place. None of the crew were released.

=== Barajas ===
The aircraft departed Sweden and headed for Spain. At 11:30 the pilot asked to land at Madrid–Barajas Airport. The aircraft landed and was surrounded by 200 police officers. An English-speaking technician, a Norwegian SAS employee and the airport's director were let aboard the aircraft, where they negotiated the release of the crew. After it was made clear that the Spanish authorities would not allow the plane to take off, the hijackers surrendered at 14:47. When the aircraft was stormed and the hijackers arrested, the Spanish military police took care of the two bags of money. However, by the end of the action some of the money was not accounted for.

== Aftermath ==
The overall handling of the incident was regarded as a success by the Swedish cabinet members. With the Munich massacre having taken place ten days earlier, there was a relief that the hijacking had ended without casualties. However, the Swedish authorities received harsh criticism from the Government of Yugoslavia for having met the demands of the hijackers. Flight 130 remains the only aircraft to be successfully hijacked in Sweden.

A parliamentary commission, led by Carl Lidbom, was subsequently appointed to look into Swedish terror legislation. It concluded on 8 December 1972 that new legislation was indeed needed, cited the increase in terrorism both domestically and abroad. It proposed the need for easing deportation of people suspected of belonging to terrorist groups or partaking in politically motivated violence. A preliminary debate took place in Parliament on 11 December, and a proposal for legislation was presented by the cabinet on 19 January 1973. It was initially limited in duration from 15 April 1973 to 14 April 1974. The main debate in Parliament took place on 6 April, where it was passed with a large majority. The Terrorism Act gave increased rights for the police and the Swedish Security Service to deport foreigners and undercover surveillance of suspects. However, it was met with criticism that it reduced the civil rights of innocent foreigners. The law was permanently prolonged the following year.

The hijackers and the prisoners were arrested by Spanish police and sentenced to one year of prison. After that they were permitted to move to Paraguay. Upon the breakup of Yugoslavia and the break-out of the Croatian War of Independence, they returned to their native land to fight for Croatian independence, where they were welcomed as heroes. Barešić was amongst the highest profiles amongst Croatian soldiers. His death in 1991 was kept a secret for a year to not break morale and he was posthumously appointed a general.

== See also ==
- 1971 Yugoslav Embassy shooting

== Bibliography ==
- Hansén, Dan (2007). Crisis and perspectives on policy change: Swedish counter-terrorism policymaking (PDF). Stockholm: CRISMART, Swedish National Defense College. ISBN 9789185401659. SELIBR 10371000.
