= Lars-Inge Svartenbrandt =

Swedish criminal

- Born: Lars-Inge Andersson; 5 May 1945; Grytnäs, Sweden
- Died: 15 April 2016 (aged 70); Kopparberg, Sweden
- Other names: Lars Patrick Ferm; Lars Patrick Carlander
- Occupation: Criminal
- Years active: 1957–2016
- Spouse(s): Susanna Franzén (3 children (among them Jackie Ferm)); Karin (2 children); Anna-Lena Carlander (2015–2016)
- Children: 5, including Jackie

Lars-Inge Andersson (5 May 1945 – 15 April 2016), best known as Lars-Inge Svartenbrandt, later Lars Patrick Ferm and even later known as Lars Patrick Carlander, was a Swedish criminal. Svartenbrandt spent almost 40 years combined in prison for several robberies, violent crimes, and prison escapes. He was described as the "most dangerous man in Sweden". Svartenbrandt described himself as an "uncurable psychopath".

== Early life ==
Lars-Inge Svartenbrandt was born on 5 May 1945 in Grytnäs Parish in Avesta Municipality, Dalarna County, Sweden. He grew up under unstable conditions. At twelve years old, he was placed under protective public care order (skyddsuppfostran) and ended up in juvenile detention school. In May 1961 he celebrated his 16th birthday by escaping from a juvenile detention school. The following year, 1962, he broke into a military armory and received his first prison sentence but escaped the following year. In 1967, he received his first detention sentence (interneringsdom) for grand theft (grov stöld) and threat to public servant (hot mot tjänsteman). In 1969 came his first conviction for armed robbery when he was sentenced to four years in prison.

== 1970s and 1980s ==
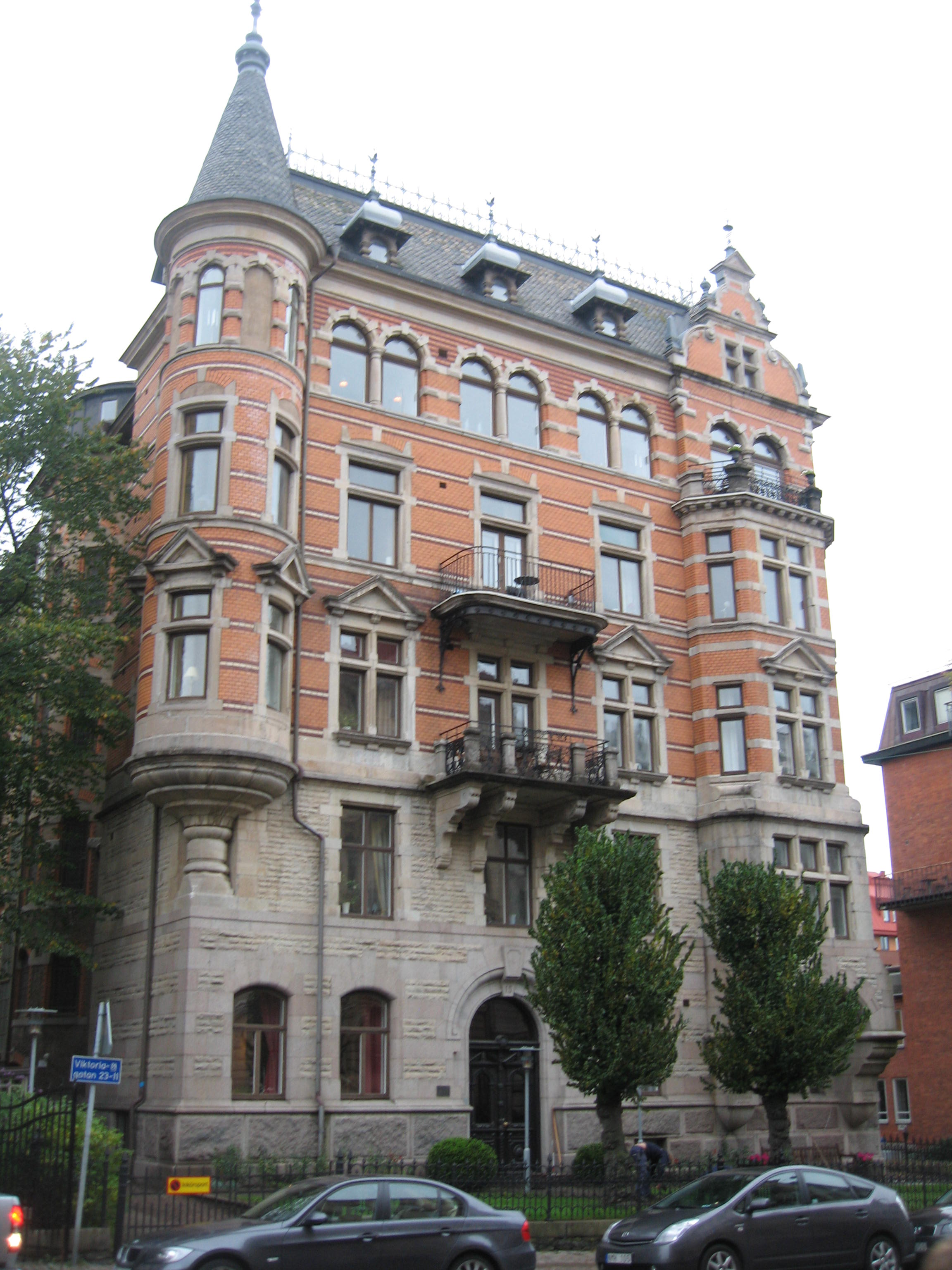
Viktoriagatan 15 in Gothenburg where Svartenbrandt managed escape to after the robbery at Döbelnsgatan in Stockholm in 1979. During a nighttime police raid, he gave up and was returned to the custody.

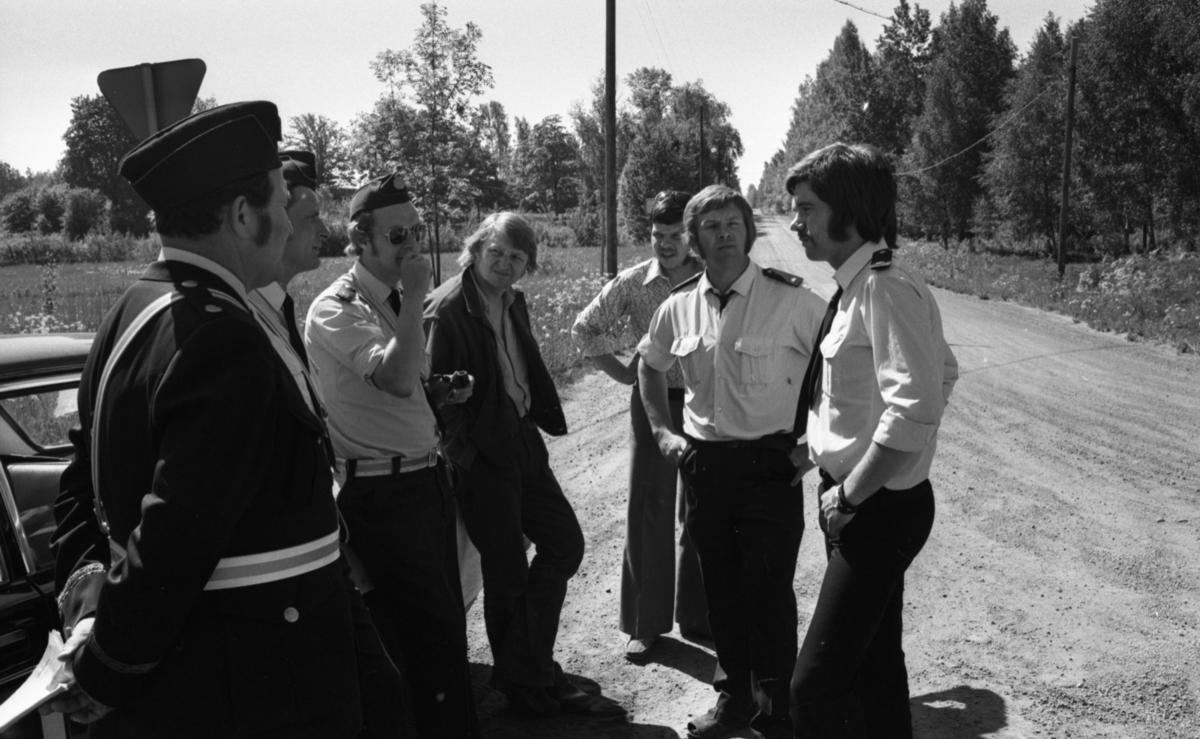
Police hunt for Svartenbrandt and the other escapees from Kumla Prison, 8 June 1973.

Svartenbrandt first came to public attention in connection with the spectacular mass escape from the Kumla Prison in August 1972. He had managed to hide in a saucepan cupboard in the security department and the guards had not noticed that he was missing when they locked up the prisoners for the night. Svartenbrandt crawled out of his cupboard after a few hours and unlocked his fellow prisoners' cell doors using counterfeit keys. The escapers included Lars-Inge Svartenbrandt, Bo "Bosse Dynamit" Wickman, Jan Holger "Nisse Pistol" Nilsson, Karl Bruno "Kalle Kanon" Karlsson and the Yugoslav Embassy murderers Miro Barešić and Anđelko Brajković. Together with 15 other hard-hit interns, including terrorist Miro Barešic, he climbed over the "fugitive walls" from what which was called Europe's safest prison, and disappeared. Svartenbrandt was arrested a week later in Lindesberg. The following year, in June 1973, he escaped along with three other prisoners in a garbage truck. Svartenbrandt and "Nisse Pistol" and two other companions jumped over the fence and hijacked the garbage truck by threatening the driver with a weapon they came across. They rammed the prison gate and disappeared. After two months on the run, Svartenbrandt was captured in Rörsås, south of Mariestad. Svartenbrandt was granted leave in October 1979 from Hall Prison to visit a doctor in Uppsala. Instead he freed his friend Benny Lilja who along with other prisoners had gone to the bathhouse in Södertälje. Svartenbrandt was waiting outside the bath house in a black Jaguar and Lilja got into the car and the two drove off.

Svartenbrandt and his companion Benny Lilja parted ways on 22 November 1979, when Svartenbrandt would help an acquaintance to collect a debt in an apartment on Kungsgatan in Stockholm. This ended with the two men getting murdered. Svartenbrandt confessed seven years later that he stabbed one of the victims with a hunting knife, but argued that his companion, who was now dead, fired the fatal shots. The day after Svartenbrandt and Benny Lilja rushed into the post office on Döbelnsgatan in Stockholm with rubber masks depicting Elvis Presley and John Travolta over their faces and AK 4's in their hands. During the escape Svartenbrandt fired 19 shots into a police van from the Östermalm police where officers Christer Backman, Gunnar Andersson and Dick Gunnelöf were sitting. All of them were injured and Gunnar Andersson was hit by seven shots. A doctor described it later as "an incredible luck that he survived". Seven people were taken hostage during the escape. These were released a few hours later. The two robbers managed to get to Gothenburg. The police tracked down their hideout on Viktoriagatan 15 and during a nighttime police raid the police sprayed tear gas into the apartment whereupon both gave up. Svartenbrandt was sentenced to twelve years in prison for attempted murder, aggravated robbery (grovt rån) and unlawful deprivation of liberty (olaga frihetsberövande).

During this sentence, he made several unsuccessful attempts to escape. In 1981 Svartenbrandt tried to escape by stabbing a guard with a sharpened toothbrush. Two years later in 1983 his wife tried to rescue him from the Hall Prison which failed and the result was another ten months to his sentence. The same year he was transferred to Säter's Mental Hospital in Dalarna. In May 1986, during a leave from prison to visit his mother, he escaped. He stole a car and went to Uppsala, where he robbed a post office. After his arrest, Svartenbrandt was sentenced to an additional 7.5 years in prison. A few years later he moved to the regional unit at Säter Mental Hospital where he got his own apartment, and the ability to move freely.

== 1990s ==
At midnight on Friday the 2 March 1990 he robbed at gunpoint a gas station outside Borlänge. He stole 4,000 SEK and forced a customer to help him escape. During a burglary of an officer's home in Falun, Svartenbrandt had stolen the gun and at the same time come across an assault rifle, two smoke grenades, two hand grenades, and large quantities of ammunition. The same month, he held his new girlfriend hostage in his apartment in the hospital for six days without anyone noticing it. While on leave on 22 March, he was arrested and confessed to all the crimes. In June 1992, Svartenbrandt was freed and then changed his name to Lars Ferm. After a few days he robbed Handelsbanken at Sankt Eriksplan in Stockholm dressed in a women's wig, fake mustache and a plastic gun. He came across some 100,000 SEK and fled on a bicycle through Rörstrandsgatan to Karlberg Palace Park, and was arrested in the bushes at Pompe's grave (dogs owned by Charles XII of Sweden). The reason for the robbery was according to Svartenbrandt that he had been promised to borrow 18,000 SEK from a friend, but who backed out. He was then forced to rob a bank to afford to start a new life and work as a stonemason. He was sentenced to four years in prison for the bank robbery. Svartenbrandt tried after the arrest to commit suicide at Kronobergshäktet in Stockholm, but the guards managed stop him and he should afterwards "have been healed through salvation," which is something he wrote about in his autobiography Svartenbrandt (1995).

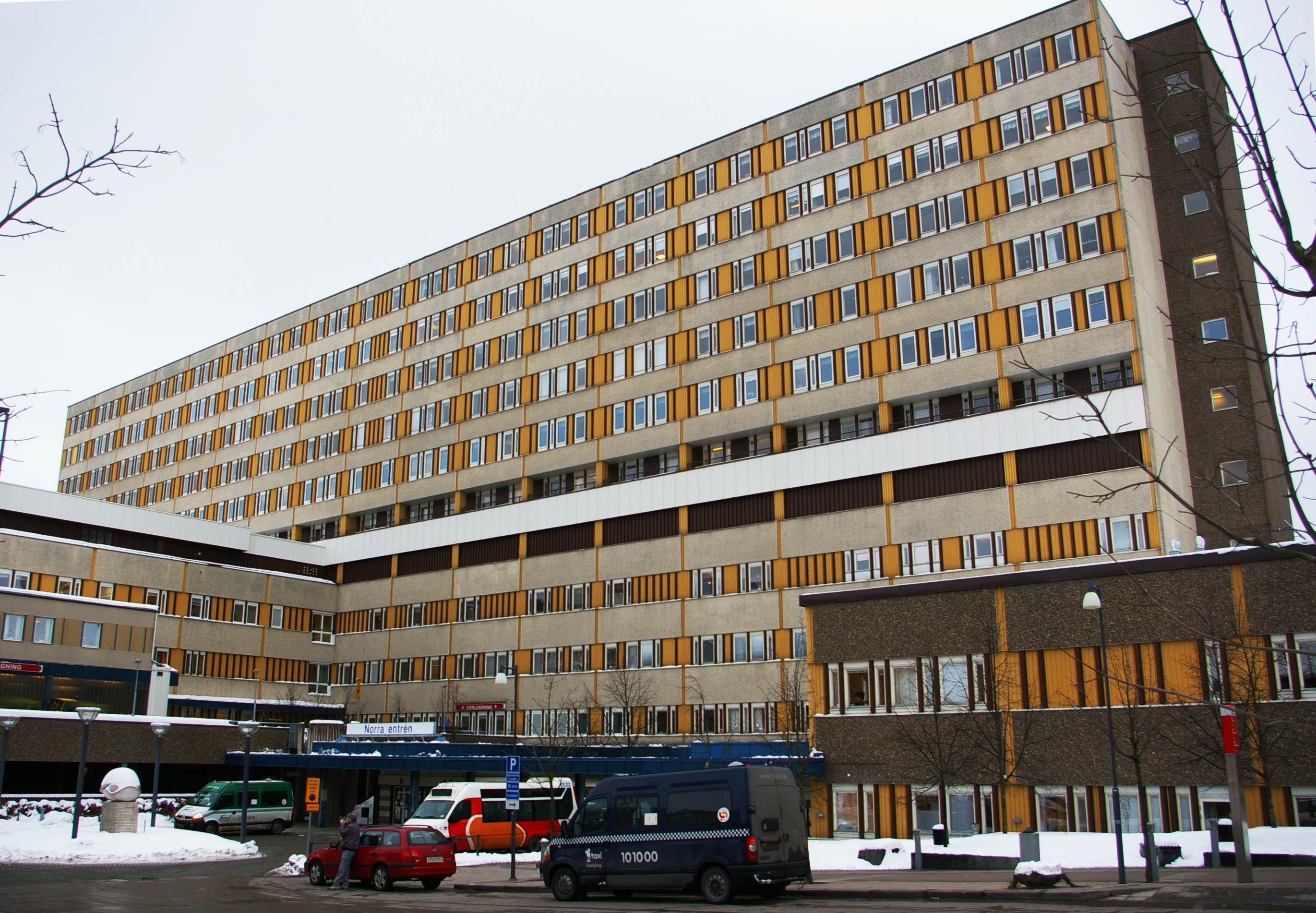
Linköping University Hospital where Svartenbrandt was arrested the day after he fired on a police car on 8 June 1999.

After the arrest, he applied to the non-conformist LP Foundation (LP-stiftelsen), was baptized and was admitted to a theological education in Örebro and said, after getting out from prison in February 1995, that "I'm going to be a driver's license holder and taxpayer." He released an autobiography and set up a stand-up show that he acted in. Large back taxes and a quarrel with his wife in Linköping made, however, everything burst and Svartenbrandt robbed on 11 January 1996 the nearest post office in Linköping with a toy gun. During the robbery a cashier had recognized him despite his mask. He fled to Germany after the robbery where spent all the money from the robbery in the casino. He made it to the Canary Islands where he let himself be interviewed on the beach but was later arrested by the Spanish police in Playa de las Américas on 23 January 1996 and was taken from the police station to the island's central prison, Tenerife II. He was then transferred to the Spanish central Carabanchel Prison in Madrid where he remained for three months. He was extradited to Sweden in May and sentenced to four years and six months imprisonment. He was released from Norrtälje Prison in early February 1999 and then left his family in Linköping and was living with his new girlfriend at a friend in Stockholm.

On 8 June 1999, he and a 20-year-old companion committed a robbery and a shooting at a police car outside the Linköping University Hospital in Linköping. During the night of Tuesday the 8 June, shortly after half past three in the morning, three police officers were called, two men and one woman, to the parking lot outside Linköping University Hospital. It would check an ongoing car break-in, and was then subjected to heavy fire. A police officer was hit in the shoulder. The event was connected to the Malexander murders that occurred two weeks earlier. Andreas Axelsson, one of the perpetrators at the Malexander murders, was admitted to the Linköping University Hospital at that time. The day after Svartenbrandt was taken into custody after he was found at a staircase in the hospital. He was then taken by the police to the psychiatric clinic. On 30 June, he decided himself to go to Linköping and hand him over to the police because he felt singled out in the media for the shooting, but was released. He then denied any involvement. On 13 July, he was arrested at a McDonald's restaurant in Upplands Väsby after having been shadowed by the police since Länna south of Stockholm. At the time of his arrest he was also suspected for a bank robbery in Helsingborg on 6 May but was acquitted of these charges. He was convicted, however, for the other offenses to a six-month prison sentence.

== 2000s ==
On 9 November 2000, Svartenbrandt was paroled from prison. On 12 January 2001 he was arrested by the Piken in Landskrona after having assaulted his ex-wife and their 10-year-old daughter in her apartment. He had also been assaulted and had called 112. He was sentenced to one year in prison. In the spring of 2002, he moved to Arbrå, 15 kilometers north of Bollnäs. On 14 October 2002 Svartenbrandt robbed the Systembolaget in Söderhamn and took a woman hostage. The woman was kidnapped at a gas station before the robbery so that he could take her car. She was released after the robbery in a forest and was found with broken ribs and wounds on the head and hand. Svartenbrandt was arrested and convicted in Bollnäs District Court for aggravated robbery and kidnapping and was sentenced to seven years in prison. Svartenbrandt's 32-year-old accomplice was sentenced to five years in prison and together they would pay just over 430,000 SEK in damages. After five years in Norrtälje Prison, he was released on 29 October 2007 and then published his second book ...men saknar kärlek (2007), and gave lectures to paying audiences in Dalarna. He then talked again about God and distanced himself from his old life. In January 2008, he was arrested for offence against the Swedish Knife Act (brott mot knivlagen) and drug offenses in the mall in his former hometown of Borlänge. In August 2008, he was caught red-handed during a burglary in a summer cottage. In 2008, Svartenbrandt was evicted from his apartment because the rent was not paid, and several distraint attempts was made in 2007 and 2008.

On 11 December 2008, Svartenbrandt was stopped by police in Dalkarlsbo in Dalarna. In the car police found drugs and a homemade firearm. He was also suspected for being under the influence of drugs and was arrested and detained on suspicion of drug offenses, DUI, driving without a license and weapons offenses. He was released the following day. On 3 April 2009, he robbed a grocery store in Blackeberg and stole a little over 5,000 SEK. A few days later, on 8 April 2009, he and an accomplice robbed Swedbank branch in Säter and stole just under 100,000 SEK. Svartenbrandt was quickly suspected of the crime and was arrested in absentia. The robbers stolen blue Volvo 440 was found an hour after the robbery on a forest road at Magnilbo west of Säter. Svartenbrandt lived in the nineties, sometimes in a cottage in the area. A month before the robbery Svartenbrandt had been fined of several petty crimes. The next day at 05:56 in the morning, he was arrested on Riksväg 62 north of Råda at the entrance to Hagfors Airport in Värmland together with a woman. Later one more person was arrested in a house in Hagfors. The detention hearing took place on 12 April 2009 at the police station in Borlänge. He then spent more than two months in custody before he admitted involvement in the robbery. Svartenbrandt was sentenced to five years in prison for robbery. The robbery resulted in about 96,000 SEK in various currencies. The money and the weapons were never found. He was also sentenced along with two other accomplices to jointly pay damages of more than 140,000 SEK. Svartenbrandt was also convicted for the shop robbery in Blackeberg and would with his accomplice jointly have to pay damages of more than 70,000 SEK. In 2011 Svartenbrandt was incarcerated at Salberga Prison in Sala.

== 2010s ==
On 13 April 2014, Svartenbrandt was released after the five-year prison sentence from 2009. Less than a day later, Svartenbrandt was reported to the police for unlawful threat (olaga hot) after threatening his daughter Jackie Ferm. On 5 December 2014 Svartenbrandt was arrested on probable cause suspected of rape by Falu District Court after having surrendered voluntarily to the police in Lund. He had previously in absentia been arrested a number of days suspected of the crime. Svartenbrandt was released on 19 December 2014 after the investigation was closed because of lack of evidence. In February 2015 Svartenbrandt told Expressen that he suffered from malignant prostate cancer. Svartenbrandt was arrested again on 19 May 2015 on suspicion of attempted murder and gross weapons offence (grovt vapenbrott) after a brawl in a residence in Ställberg in Ljusnarsberg Municipality. On 29 September 2015 he was arrested in central Kopparberg. He was charged on 16 October 2015 for assault of a woman. On 26 November 2015 Örebro District Court sentenced Svartenbrandt to two months in prison for assault, unlawful threat (olaga hot) and threat to public servant (hot mot tjänsteman). He was also suspected of attempted violence to public servant (våld mot tjänsteman), but was acquitted on that allegation. He was also sentenced for assaulting a woman with whom he argued about his health and the treatment he underwent. Svartenbrandt was also charged for in connection with this to have threatened a teenager and a man who witnessed the altercation, but was acquitted of the allegations. The sentence was two months in prison and damages totaling 40,000 SEK to the four police officers.

=== Death ===
Police received an alarm that an altercation took place in an apartment in Kopparberg. When they arrived at the scene they discovered the fire. Anna-Lena Carlander, Svartenbrandt's wife, suffered minor smoke inhalation injuries and was rescued from the apartment by emergency services. When the firemen went in, they also found Svartenbrandt dead. He was 70 years old.

== Personal life ==
Lars-Inge Svartenbrandt had five children; three with his first wife Susanna Franzén, including the daughter Jackie Ferm, who participated as a contestant on the 2010 reality show Paradise Hotel on the Swedish TV6 channel. His son Jack died on 3 November 2006, 14 years old, in a traffic accident in Svalöv. Svartenbrandt got the news of his son's death while incarcerated at Norrtälje Prison. He was allowed to attend his son's funeral service at Sankt Johannes Church in Landskrona, albeit escorted by three corrections officers from the Norrtälje Prison. In 2015, he married Anna-Lena Carlander and adopted her last name.

== Bibliography ==
- Ferm, Lars (1994). Svartenbrandt (in Swedish). Stockholm: Sellin & partner. ISBN 91-7055-121-9. SELIBR 7596745.
- Ferm, Lars (2007). ...men saknar kärlek (in Swedish). Volubel. SELIBR 11769901.
