= Torslanda Airport =

Former airport of Gothenburg, Sweden (1923–1977)

Torslanda Torslanda flygfält
- IATA: GOT; ICAO: ESGB

Summary
- Airport type: Defunct
- Serves: Gothenburg
- Location: Torslanda, Sweden
- Opened: 5 August 1923
- Closed: 3 October 1977
- Interactive map of Torslanda

Runways
Direction	Length		Surface
Direction	ft	m	Surface
04/22		1,930
14/32		2,060
09/27		1,125
- Largely demolished, no longer operational.

Torslanda Airport (Swedish: Torslanda flygplats or Torslanda flygfält; IATA: GOT, ICAO: ESGB) served the city of Gothenburg, Sweden, as its main airport from 1923 to 1977, when the Göteborg Landvetter Airport was opened. The airport closed soon afterwards.

== Facilities ==
In 1969, an air traffic control tower was built on an adjacent hilltop as replacement for an older tower built in 1938. The same year a new terminal building (57.71032°N 11.78008°E) was built next to the old one from 1938 (57.71097°N 11.78095°E).

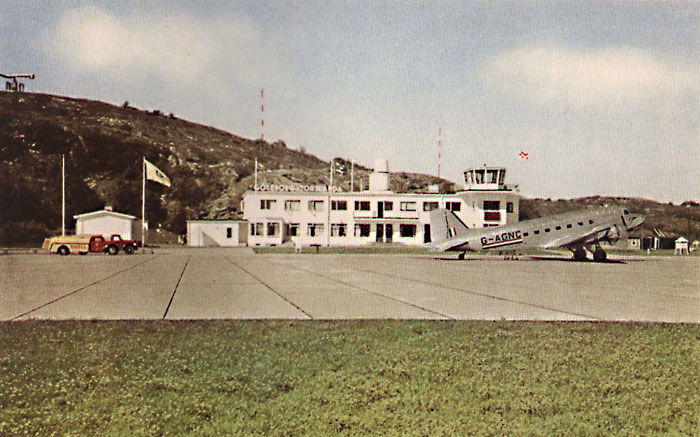
Terminal building around 1950

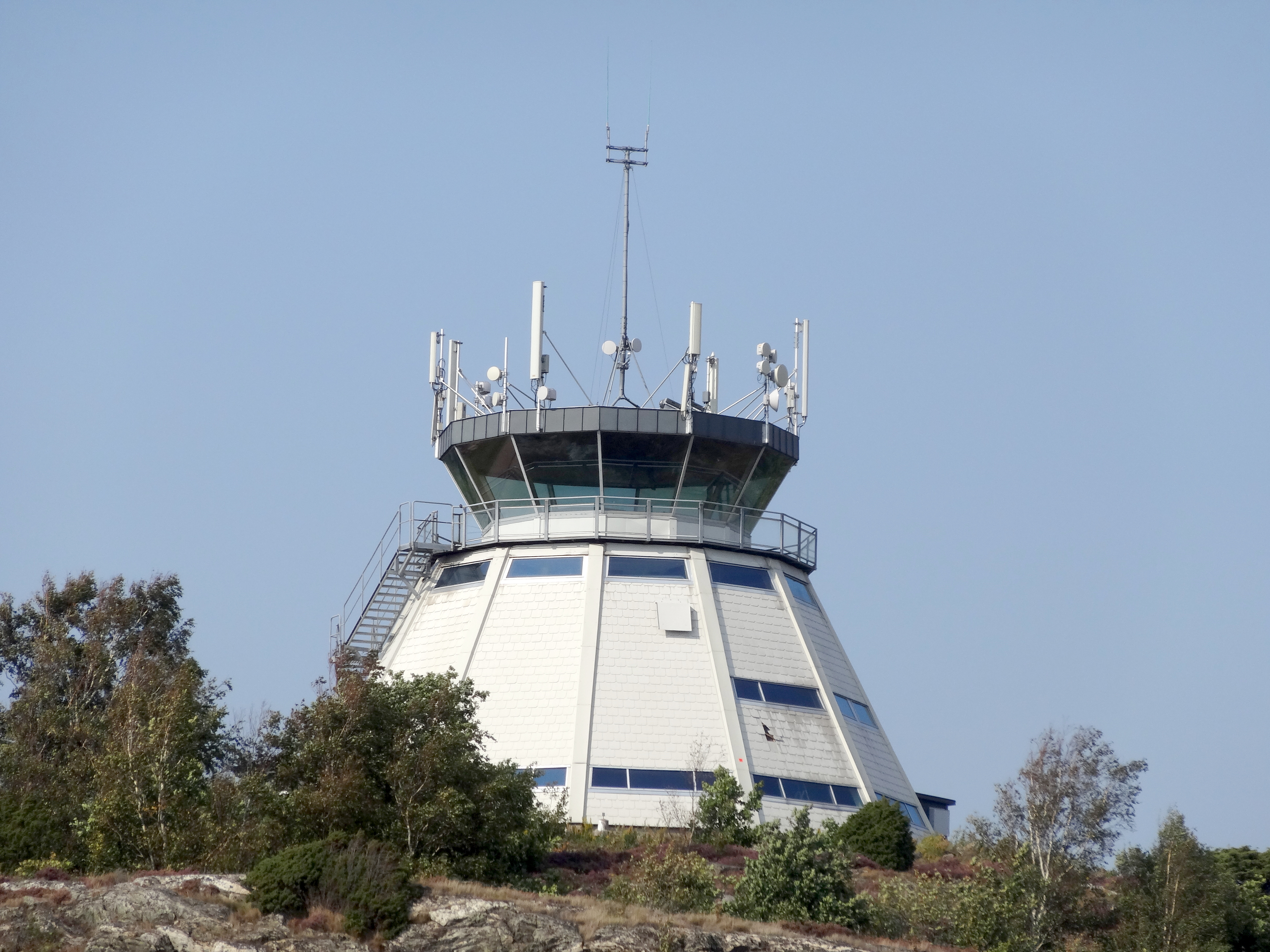
Air control tower

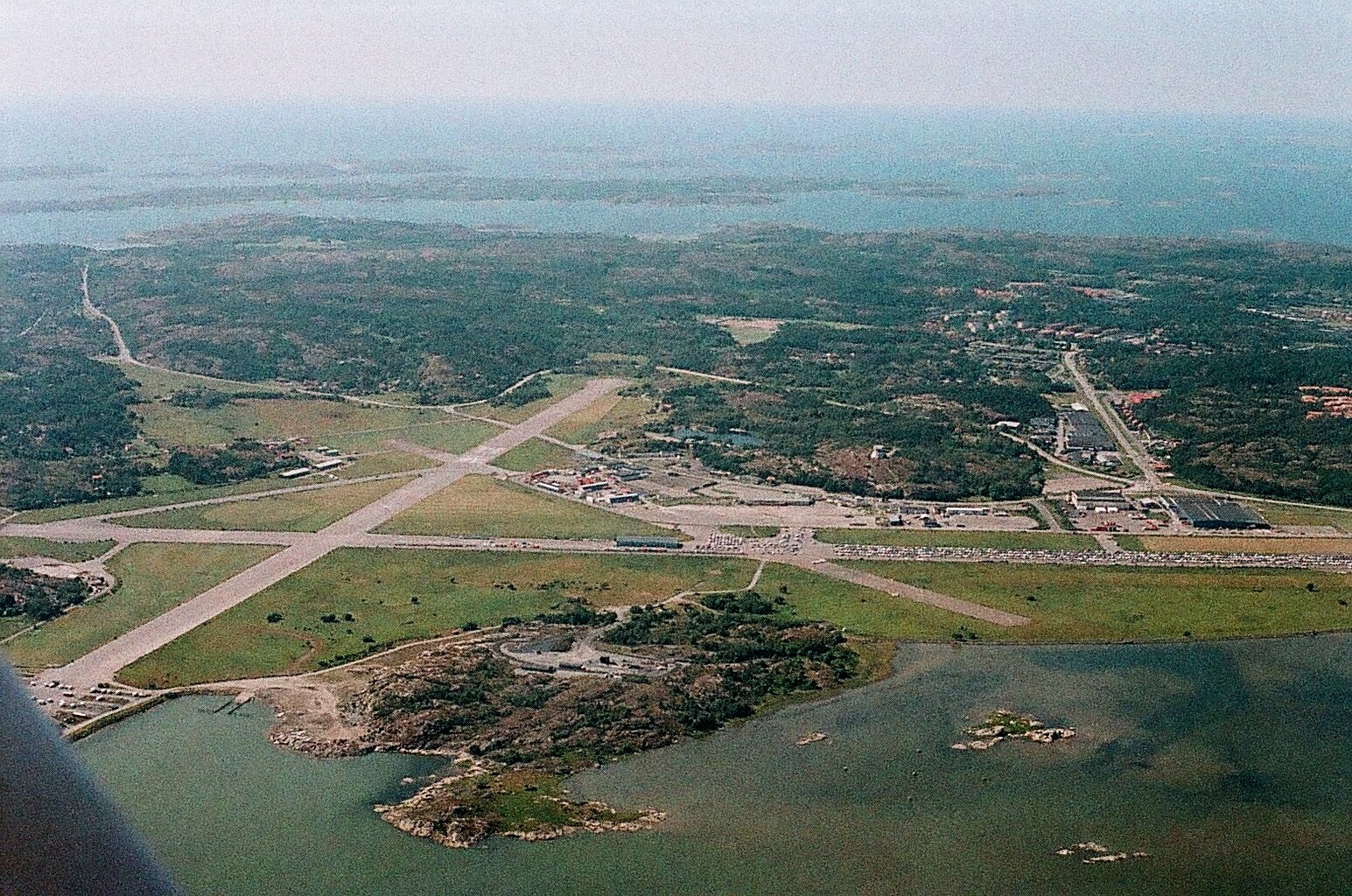
Aerial view of airport, 1984

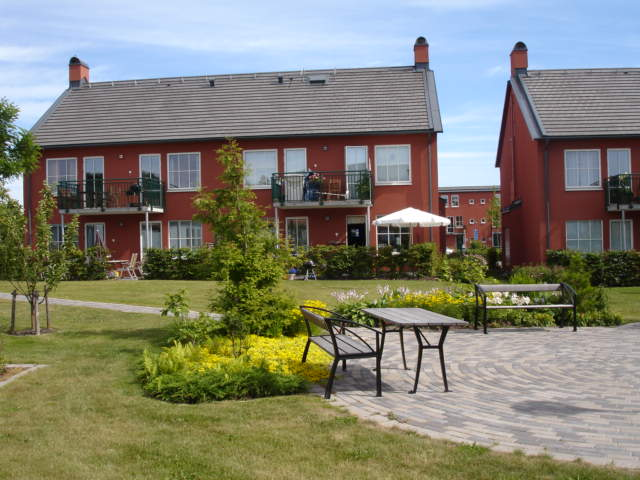
Amhult, redeveloped from the Torslanda Airport

There were three runways, reduced to two after 1966 when those were extended. There were only limited taxiways, so aircraft needed to taxi along runways and to turn around at end of runway.

Runway	Length year 1948	Length year 1966
04/22	1,850	1,930
14/32	1,125	2,060
09/27	1,160	–

== Incidents ==
The airport had been the site of a mishap on 23 December 1967 when a Douglas DC-6B operated by Sterling Airways carrying 55 passengers en route from Stockholm landed 3000 feet beyond the landing threshold.

In a notable 1972 incident, SAS flight 130 from Torslanda en route to Stockholm was hijacked and diverted to Bulltofta airport outside the Swedish city of Malmö. Nine Croatians imprisoned nearby were traded for 500.000 SEK before flying to Madrid, Spain, before being captured by police.

== Use after the closure ==
The 1969 control tower remains (as of 2022) as one of the last artifacts of the airport. Both the 1938 and 1969 terminal buildings also remain and are used for shops and services. Most of the old airport surface was demolished in 1997, when the former runway paving were mainly removed.

Until 1995, Volvo housed its collection of historic vehicles in "The "Blue Hangar" (Den Blå Hangaren). Now they are located in the Volvo Museum, a few kilometres away.

In recent years, the original land from the Torslanda Airport has quickly redeveloped into a residential area known as Amhult, eventually to become a garden village with 900 new homes, a commercial centre, preschool and school.

The former runways have partially been used for car testing by Volvo, for driver training and race car testing, and for model aircraft, until the runways were removed. An area is still used for storing ship containers. A golf course has been built over parts of the former runways. The road no 155 to Öckerö went from 1966 a detour around the north–south runways. Around 1997 the road was rebuilt to go straight across the former runway.

== Amhult ==
The name Amhult was popularised by William Edelman in 2001, when he was requested to build a futuristic population centre. The architect, Mikael Jansson, made a sketch of the centre but his sketch was never realized due to major measurement failures.

The construction headman, Frans Bergentall, claims that Mikael Janssons sketches were stolen from Simon Nestorovski, an investigation were started late in 2003, but no evidence was found. The case closed early in 2010.
