= Kumla Prison =

Prison in Sweden

Anstalten Kumla
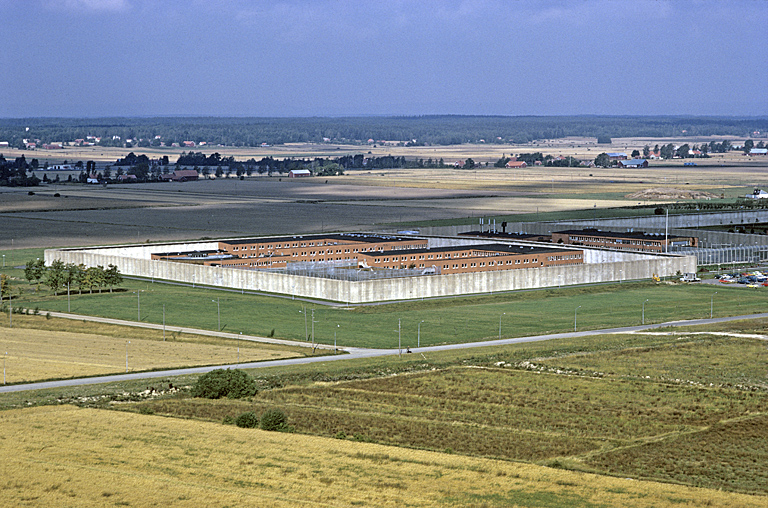
- Kumla Prison, mid-1970s.
- Interactive map of Anstalten Kumla
- Location: Kumla, Örebro County, Sweden; 59°07′08.63″N 15°07′38.70″E
- Status: Operational
- Security class: Maximum
- Capacity: 420
- Opened: 1965
- Managed by: Swedish Prison and Probation Service
- Warden: Kenneth Gustafsson

Kumla Prison (Swedish: Anstalten Kumla) is a prison facility in Kumla Municipality, Sweden. It was opened in 1965 and is Sweden's largest prison. Kumla is one of three high security prisons in Sweden holding risk inmates (security class 1). On 18 March 2009, a new supermax facility was opened inside the Kumla Prison.

== Controversies ==
=== The 1972 escape of 15 inmates ===
On the night of 18 August 1972, between 3 am and 4 am, 15 inmates escaped from the Kumla bunker, which was considered the most escape-proof prison in Sweden. Those who escaped were considered to be some of Sweden's most dangerous criminals. Among the escapees were Lars-Inge Svartenbrandt, Miro Barešić and Nisse Pistol, among others. One of the factors contributing to the success of the escape was that the security department was not monitored by guards around the clock. Instead, guards patrolled the department at regular intervals during the night.

The police were able to establish early on that the 15 cell doors had not been broken into, but had been opened with a key. However, it has never been proven how the actual opening of the doors took place. One theory is that the inmates made their own keys by secretly making impressions of the guards' keys. Another theory is that the keys were bought by a prison guard. In order to open the doors, an inmate managed to fool the guards that he was already locked up. He then hid until the ward was unattended and then unlocked the others' cells. A total of 20 cells were opened, but five inmates chose to stay behind, partly because they had little time left before their release. The escape caused a huge police response. All 15 of the escapees were eventually captured by the police.

=== The 1991 escape ===
On 9 May 1991, Marten Imandi and Ioan Ursuț escaped from Kumla. They were both placed in the security section of the institution.

== Notable inmates ==
- Jackie Arklov
- Clark Olofsson
- Christer Pettersson
- Lars-Inge Svartenbrandt
- Rakhmat Akilov
- John Ausonius
- Stig Bergling
- Helge Fossmo
- Daniel Maiorana
- Mijailo Mijailović
- Jon Nödtveidt
- Tony Olsson
- Rahmi Sahindal
- Tommy Zethraeus
- Miro Barešić
