= Croatian Revolution Hackers =

Hacker group

Croatian Revolution Hackers (CRH; Croatian: Hakeri Hrvatske Revolucije, HHR) was a black hat hacking group originating in Croatia, known for using DDoS, defacement, and other methods against targeted websites in Croatia and neighboring countries (Serbia, Bosnia and Herzegovina, Montenegro, etc.) The group was disbanded in 2014 (exact date unknown). It is believed that CRH was the biggest Croatian hacking group ever.

== Members ==
The group consisted of four core members: DiZi, Hunt3r (a.k.a. Josip Mamic) and Meho1337 (Facebook-Meho CroatianHackers) Inco1337 (Facebook-Inco Fiju Fic Ranger).

== Targets ==
The group attacked websites using mainly DDoS as their choice of weaponry. Their targets were mostly from Croatia, including the Government of Croatia (ex. vlada.hr), the Croatian Police (policija.hr and mup.hr), websites of big banks (Hypo, Raiffeisen, etc.) and many other ministry and important websites.

== #OpCroBlackout ==
Operation Croatian Blackout (#OpCroBO) is the most notable series of attack perpetrated by CRH. It lasted from 1 July until 7 July 2013. The group claimed to have shut down over 1000 websites originating from Croatia, including the biggest media ones (dnevnik.hr, 24sata.hr, and such), and to have defaced and stolen data from Croatian Radiotelevision (hrt.hr). The attack made headlines across the Balkans, and rumors said it was the biggest DDoS attack ever carried out in the region.
