= Jackie Ferm =

Swedish writer, blogger, reality series participant and glamour model

- Born: Jacqueline Liliana Ferm; 9 September 1990 (age 34); Falun, Sweden
- Known for: Paradise Hotel (TV series); Rövardotter (2014 book)
- Parent: Lars-Inge Svartenbrandt

Jacqueline Liliana "Jackie" Ferm (born 9 September 1990) is a Swedish writer, blogger, reality series participant and glamour model. She took part and won the Swedish version of the television reality series Paradise Hotel in 2010 and in 2014, published her autobiography titled Rövardotter.

== Biography ==
She is the daughter of convicted criminal Lars-Inge Svartenbrandt. During most part of Ferm's life, her father was convicted and imprisoned on several criminal charges, and her family had to move several times to be closer to his imprisonment location in various prisons. Ferm spent a lot of time in different foster homes and youth centers after her mother left in 2000. Ferm came into the spotlight already at birth as her delivery was filmed for the documentary En ond mans jättedrömmar (Giant dreams of an evil man).

In 2009, she did a cover for the men's magazine Slitz where she posed nude. Ferm told in interviews that she did the nude spread to embarrass her father who was imprisoned at the time.

Ferm gained fame when she participated in and won the 2010 series of Paradise Hotel on TV6 along with partner Patrik Bergholm.

In 2014, Ferm told her story in the autobiographic book Rövardotter co-written with author Ola Brising. The book was published by Bookmark Förlag in April 2014.

== Personal life ==
Ferm's brother Jack died in a bus accident on 3 November 2006 in Svalöv.

== Bibliography ==
- Rövardotter, Bookmark Förlag (2014) ISBN 9789175470870
