= 20th-century history of Kosovo =

Kosovo during the 20th century in history has largely been characterised by wars and major population displacements. The region formed a part of numerous entities, some internationally recognised, others not.

== The onset of the 20th century ==
At the turn of the century, Kosovo lay entirely within the Ottoman Empire. Its status was as a vilayet and it occupied a territory significantly larger than today's entity and with Üsküp (now Skopje) as provincial capital. Its own borders were internally expanded following a local administrations reorganisation by the Porte in 1882. The independence of Serbia and Montenegro in 1878 meant that Kosovo was the last line of defence for the Ottomans in Rumelia (Ottoman territory on the European continent). After Bosnia and Herzegovina were incorporated into Austria-Hungary in 1908, Kosovo shared a frontier with three countries: Serbia, Montenegro and Austria-Hungary.

This is how Kosovo remained until the Ottoman Empire was dragged into the First Balkan War in which the local non-Turkish population of Rumelia struggled for self-determination in addition to a joint attack by the Balkan League (all serving the interests of those nations while seeking to expand their own borders); during this time, the populous Albanian nation fought its own battle against both the Ottomans and the surrounding countries that attempted to deny the Albanians a national state.

== Balkan Wars ==
During the Balkan Wars of 1912, most of Kosovo was taken from the Ottoman Empire by the Kingdom of Serbia while the region of Metohija (known as the Dukagjini Valley to ethnic-Albanians) was taken by the Kingdom of Montenegro. Throughout the centuries, populations of ethnic Serbs and Albanians tended to shift following territorial handovers. As a result of the multi-ethnic composition of Kosovo, the new administrations provoked a mixed response from the local population. Whilst Albanians (with a slim majority of just over 50%) did not welcome Serbian rule, the non-Albanian population (mainly Bulgarian, Serb and Bosniak) considered this a liberation.

According to Noel Malcolm writing for The Guardian:

Kosovo remained Ottoman territory until it was conquered by Serbian forces in 1912. Serbs would say "liberated"; but even their own estimates put the Orthodox Serb population at less than 25%. The majority population was Albanian, and did not welcome Serb rule, so "conquered" seems the right word. But legally, Kosovo was not incorporated into the Serbian kingdom in 1912; it remained occupied territory until some time after 1918. Then, finally, it was incorporated, not into a Serbian state, but into a Yugoslav one. And with one big interruption (the second world war) it remained part of some sort of Yugoslav state until June 2006.

In 1918, Serbia became a part of the newly formed Kingdom of Serbs, Croats and Slovenes, later named Yugoslavia.

== World War I ==
The Serbian Army (helped mainly by the Italian and French Army) was able to recuperate and the sick and injured soldiers received medical attention since they were away from the front lines. Once they were refreshed and regrouped, they returned to the battlefield.

In 1918, the Serbian Army pushed the Central Powers out of Kosovo. Following World War I, the Kingdom of the Serbs, Croats and Slovenes was formed, shortly after retaking Kosovo, capturing Vojvodina from Austria-Hungary, and unifying with Montenegro to form a larger Kingdom of Serbia.

== Kingdom of Yugoslavia (1918–1941) ==
The peace treaties of 1919–1920 established a Yugoslav state named "The Kingdom of Slovenes, Croats and Serbs", also called "Yugoslavia". The Kingdom comprised 12 million people, 400,000 were Albanian. Kosovo was split into four counties – three being a part of the entity of Serbia: Zvečan, Kosovo and southern Metohija; and one of Montenegro: northern Metohija. However, the new administration system since 26 April 1922 split Kosovo among three Areas of the Kingdom: Kosovo, Rascia and Zeta. In 1929, the Kingdom was transformed into the Kingdom of Yugoslavia. The territories of Kosovo were split among the Banate of Zeta, the Banate of Morava and the Banate of Vardar.

By 1921 Albanian Kosovars asked the League of Nations to unite Kosovo with Albania. They alleged 12,000 Albanians had been killed and 22,000 imprisoned since 1918. A Kachak movement of armed Albanians seeking union with Albania developed. The government considered this subversive to the Yugoslav constitution.

Colonisation of Kosovo was a state project implemented by the Kingdom of Yugoslavia during the interwar period. During this colonisation, 60,000–65,000 people settled in Kosovo colonists. Over 90% of the total number of colonists were Serbs (including Montenegrins).

Parallel with the colonization, the country carried out forced migration of Albanians from Kosovo. During the period 1918–1941 90,000 to 150,000 Albanians and other Muslims emigrated from Kosovo.

In 1919, Yugoslav forces slaughtered 600 Albanian women and children in the district of Gusinje.

== World War II ==
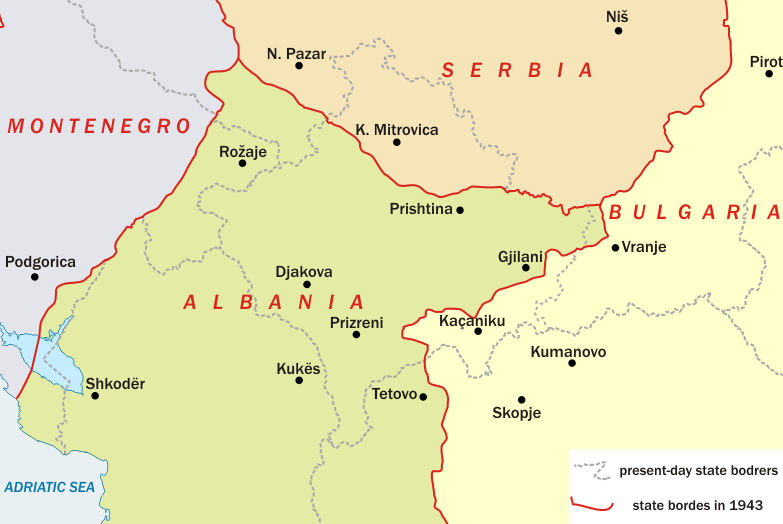
Today's Kosovo in 1941, showing in green the area annexed to the Italian Greater Albania

Yugoslavia was conquered by the Axis in April 1941 and divided mainly between Italy and Germany. Kosovo was included mainly in the Italian controlled area, and was united to fascist Albania between 1941 and 1943.

After the Axis invasion, the greatest part of Kosovo became a part of Italian-controlled Greater Albania, and a smaller, Eastern part by the Bulgarian and Nazi-German-occupied Serbia. Since the Italian occupied Albanian political leadership had decided in the Conference of Bujan that Kosovo would remain a part of Albania, they started expelling and killing the Serbian and Montenegrin populations.

Mustafa Kruja, the then-Prime Minister of Albania, was in Kosovo in June 1942, and at a meeting with the Albanian leaders of Kosovo, he said: "We should endeavor to ensure that the Serb population of Kosovo be – the area be cleansed of them and all Serbs who had been living there for centuries should be termed colonialists and sent to concentration camps in Albania. The Serb settlers should be killed." It is estimated that approximately 10,000 Serbs were massacred and a further 70,000 to 100,000 expelled from Kosovo or sent to concentration camps during WW2. In the Nuremberg trials, it was established that the SS Skanderbeg committed crimes against humanity in Kosovo against ethnic Serbs, Jews, and Roma.

After the surrender of the Kingdom of Italy in September 1943, the German forces took over direct control of the region. In September 1944 the Soviet Union declared war on Bulgaria and occupied part of the country. A coup d'état on 9 September led to Bulgaria joining the Soviets. As result in the early October three Bulgarian armies, consisting of around 340,000-man, together with the Red Army entered occupied Yugoslavia and moved from Sofia to Niš, Skopje and Pristina to blocking the German forces withdrawing from Greece. The Bulgarians operated in conjunction with the Yugoslav and Albanian communist partisans. Kosovo was liberated by the end of November. It became a province of Serbia within the Democratic Federal Yugoslavia. The Kosovo Albanians, who had been promised self-determination if they joined the partisans, rebelled and martial law was declared. It took about six months for the area to be pacified after some 20,000 Albanians under Shaban Polluza resisted integration of Kosovo within Yugoslavia.

Jewish deportations during the Holocaust also occurred in the area.

== Socialist Yugoslavia (1945–1989) ==
The province was first formed as a member of the Federal People's Republic of Yugoslavia under the leadership of the Partisan leader. This was to be the first time in history that the name of Kosovo came to espouse its current borders; prior to this, its borders, along with its status had fluctuated with time. These borders were drawn carefully so as to incorporate an area with a heavy concentration of Albanians. One such explanation for Kosovo's lines of demarcation never having been properly defined is that its Slavic and Albanian populations have even disputed the origins of the name. As such, the imaginary borders have also been disputed; for example, Albanians are of the belief that the Preševo Valley constitutes eastern Kosovo, whilst Serbs have rendered regions within today's North Macedonia to be traditional Kosovo, such as Skopje, once capital of the Ottoman province, and with a Serb/Bulgarian (Slavic) ethnic majority. Josip Broz Tito initiated this new internal entity, however, in its first years, it was symbolic as it had no factual autonomy. After Yugoslavia's name change to the Socialist Federal Republic of Yugoslavia and Serbia's to the Socialist Republic of Serbia in 1953, Kosovo gained inner autonomy in the 1960s.

In the 1974 constitution, the Socialist Autonomous Province of Kosovo's government received higher powers, including the highest governmental titles – President and Premier and a seat in the Federal Presidency which made it a de facto Socialist Republic within the Federation, but remaining as a Socialist Autonomous Province within the Socialist Republic of Serbia. Tito had pursued a policy of weakening Serbia, as he believed that a "Weak Serbia equals a strong Yugoslavia". To this end Vojvodina and Kosovo became autonomous regions and were given the above entitled privileges as de facto republics. Serbo-Croatian, Albanian were defined as official languages on the provincial level marking the two largest linguistic Kosovan groups: Albanians and Serbs. In fact, the Albanian people were able to open independent Albanian-speaking schools and universities.

Socialist Autonomous Province of Kosovo of Socialist Serbia inside Socialist Yugoslavia, 1974–1990

In the 1970s, an Albanian nationalist movement pursued full recognition of the Province of Kosovo as another Republic within the Federation, while the most extreme elements aimed for full-scale independence. Tito's arbitrary regime dealt with the situation swiftly, but only giving it a temporary solution. This combined with a very high birth rate of Albanians, and emigrations of Serbs to other parts of Yugoslavia further tilted the ethnic balance of Kosovo. Their number tripled gradually rising from almost 75% to over 90%, but the number of Serbs barely increased and dropped in the full share of the total population from some 15% down to 8%.

Beginning in March 1981, Kosovar Albanian students organized protests seeking that Kosovo become a republic within Yugoslavia. Those protests rapidly escalated into violent riots "involving 20,000 people in six cities" that were harshly contained by the Yugoslav government. During the 1980s, ethnic tensions continued with frequent violent outbreaks against Serbs and Yugoslav state authorities resulting in increased emigration of Kosovo Serbs and other ethnic groups. The Yugoslav leadership tried to suppress protests of Kosovo Serbs seeking protection from ethnic discrimination and violence.

Although they were many reports of genocide and rape against the Serbian population in Kosovo, some civil rights groups dismissed them as untrue and that economical situation (with Kosovo being the poorest area) was the catalyst for many Serb and Albanian migrations:

"There were genuine grievances by both Serbs and Albanians in Kosova, and both groups felt threatened. But Serb independent journalists and human rights workers found the more inflammatory charges to be total fabrications. A study of police records in Kosova showed only one rape of an ethnic Serb by an Albanian in an entire year. Similarly, the alleged destruction of Serb shrines turned out to involve isolated cases of vandalism, graffiti, and cutting of trees on church property – hate crimes, perhaps, but surely not the organized, genocidal annihilation that was claimed."

In fact, crime, and especially rape, was lower in Kosovo than in the rest of Serbia.

In 1986, the Serbian Academy of Sciences and Arts (SANU) was working on a document which later would be known as the SANU Memorandum, a warning to the Serbian President and Assembly of the existing crisis and where it would lead. An unfinished edition was filtered to the press. In the essay, SANU criticised the state of Yugoslavia and made remarks that the only member state contributing at the time to the development of Kosovo and Macedonia (by then, the poorest territories of the Federation) was Serbia. According to SANU, Yugoslavia was suffering from ethnic strife and the disintegration of the Yugoslav economy into separate economic sectors and territories, which was transforming the federal state into a loose confederation. On the other hand, some think that Slobodan Milošević used the discontent reflected in the SANU memorandum for his own political goals, during his rise to power in Serbia at the time.

Milošević was initially sent there as a member of the Communist party. Initially Milošević did not talk to Serbs who were at that point demonstrating for rights and freedoms that had been denied to them. During these meetings he agreed to listen to their grievances. During the meeting, outside the building where this forum was taking place police started fighting the locals who had gathered there, mostly Serbs eager to voice their grievances. After hearing about the police brutality outside of the halls, Milošević came out and in an emotional moment promised the local Serbs that "Nobody would beat you again." This news byte was seen on evening news and catapulted then-unknown Milošević to the forefront of the current debate about the problems on Kosovo.

In order to save his skin, Milošević fought back and established a political coup d'état. He gained effective leadership and control of the Serbian Communist party and pressed forward with the one issue that had catapulted him to the forefront of the political limelight, which was Kosovo. By the end of the 1980s, calls for increased federal control in the crisis-torn autonomous province were getting louder. Slobodan Milošević pushed for constitutional change amounting to suspension of autonomy for both Kosovo and Vojvodina.

Milosevic capitalized on this discontent to consolidate his own position in Serbia. In 1987, Serbian President Ivan Stambolić sent Milošević to Kosovo to "pacify restive Serbs in Kosovo." On that trip, Milošević broke away from a meeting with ethnic Albanians to mingle with angry Serbians in a suburb of Pristina. As the Serbs protested they were being pushed back by police with batons, Milošević told them, "No one is allowed to beat you." This incident was later seen as pivotal to Milošević's rise to power.

One of the events that contributed to Milošević's rise to power was the Gazimestan Speech, delivered on 28 June 1989 to 100,000 Serbs attending the celebration in Gazimestan to mark the 600th anniversary of the Battle of Kosovo. Many think that this speech helped Milošević consolidate his authority in Serbia.

In 1989, Milošević, employing a mix of intimidation and political maneuvering, drastically reduced Kosovo's special autonomous status within Serbia. Soon thereafter, After being pushed out of their jobs, out of the parliament, schools, TV, hospital and all other important institutions, Kosovo Albanians organized a non-violent separatist movement, employing widespread civil disobedience, with the ultimate goal of achieving the independence of Kosovo. Kosovo Albanians boycotted state institutions and elections and established separate Albanian schools and political institutions. On 2 July 1990, an unconstitutional Kosovo parliament declared Kosovo an independent country, although this was not recognized by Belgrade or any foreign states. Two years later, in 1992, members of the dissolved parliament organized an unofficial referendum which was observed by international organizations but was not recognized internationally. With more than 85% turnout, 95% voted for Kosovo to be independent.

== 1990s ==
After the constitutional changes, the parliaments of all Yugoslavian republics and provinces, which until then had MPs only from the Communist Party of Yugoslavia, were dissolved and multi-party elections were held for them. Kosovo Albanians refused to participate in the elections and held their own, unsanctioned elections instead. As election laws required (and still require) turnout higher than 50%, the parliament of Kosovo could not be established.

The new constitution abolished the individual provinces' official media, integrating them within the official media of Serbia while still retaining some programs in the Albanian language. The Albanian-language media in Kosovo was suppressed. Funding was withdrawn from state-owned media, including that in the Albanian language in Kosovo. The constitution made creating privately owned media possible, however their functioning was very difficult because of high rents and restricting laws. State-owned Albanian language television or radio was also banned from broadcasting from Kosovo. However, privately owned Albanian media outlets appeared; of these, probably the most famous is "Koha Ditore", which was allowed to operate until late 1998 when it was closed after it published a calendar which was claimed to be a glorification of ethnic Albanian separatists.

The constitution also transferred control over state-owned companies to the Serbian government (at the time, most of the companies were state-owned and de jure they still are). In July 1990, the Kosovo Assembly attempted to declare independence. Belgrade responded by trying to arrest those who had voted, shutting down media, and by September 1990 up to 123,000 Albanian workers were fired from their positions in government and the media, as were teachers, doctors, and workers in government-controlled industries, provoking a general strike and mass unrest. Some of those who were not sacked quit in sympathy, refusing to work for the Serbian government. Although the government claimed that it was simply getting rid of old communist directors, the sackings were widely seen as a purge of ethnic Albanians.

The old Albanian educational curriculum and textbooks were revoked and new ones were created. The curriculum was (and still is, as that is the curriculum used for Albanians in Serbia outside Kosovo) basically the same as Serbian and that of all other nationalities in Serbia except that it had education on and in the Albanian language. The new textbooks were (and still are) basically the same as those in Serbian, except that they were in the Albanian language. Education in Albanian was withdrawn in 1992 and re-established in 1994. At the Pristina University, which was seen as a centre of Kosovo Albanian cultural identity, education in the Albanian language was abolished and Albanian teachers were also sacked en masse. Albanians responded by boycotting state schools and setting up an unofficial parallel system of Albanian-language education.

Kosovo Albanians were outraged by what they saw as an attack on their rights. Following mass rioting and unrest from Albanians as well as outbreaks of inter-communal violence, in February 1990, a state of emergency was declared, and the presence of the Yugoslav Army and police was significantly increased to quell the unrest.

Unsanctioned elections were held in 1992, which overwhelmingly elected Ibrahim Rugova as "president" of a self-declared Republic of Kosovo; however these elections were not recognised by Serbian nor any foreign government. In 1995, thousands of Serb refugees from Croatia settled in Kosovo, which further worsened relations between the two communities.

Albanian opposition to sovereignty of Yugoslavia and especially Serbia had surfaced in rioting (1968 and March 1981) in the capital Pristina. Ibrahim Rugova advocated non-violent resistance, but later when it became apparent that this was not working, opposition took the form of separatist agitation by opposition political groups and armed action from 1996 by the "Kosovo Liberation Army" (Ushtria Çlirimtare e Kosovës, or UÇK).

== Kosovo War ==
After the Dayton Agreement in 1995, some Albanians organized into the Kosovo Liberation Army (KLA), employing guerilla-style tactics against Serbian police forces and civilians. Violence escalated in a series of KLA attacks and Serbian reprisals into the year 1999, with increasing numbers of civilian victims. In 1998 western interest increased and the Serbian authorities were forced to sign a unilateral ceasefire and partial retreat. Under the October agreement, the Kosovo Verification Mission moved into Kosovo to monitor the ceasefire, while Yugoslav military forces partly pulled out of Kosovo. However, the ceasefire was systematically broken shortly thereafter by KLA forces, which again provoked harsh counterattacks by the Serbs. On 16 January 1999, bodies that were claimed to be those of 45 Albanian civilians were found in the town of Reçak. The victims had been executed by Serb forces. The Racak Massacre was instrumental in increasing the pressure on Serbia in the following conference at Rambouillet. After more than a month of negotiations Yugoslavia refused to sign the prepared agreement, primarily, it has been argued, because of a clause giving NATO forces access rights to not only Kosovo but to all of Yugoslavia (which the Yugoslav side saw as tantamount to military occupation).

This triggered a 78-day NATO campaign in 1999. At first limited to military targets in Kosovo proper, the bombing campaign was soon extended to cover targets all over Yugoslavia, mainly military camps, but also including bridges, power stations, factories, broadcasting stations, and various military buildings. During the conflict, roughly one million ethnic Albanians were expelled or were forcefully driven from Kosovo, several thousand were killed (the numbers and the ethnic distribution of the casualties are uncertain and highly disputed). An estimated ten to twelve thousand ethnic Albanians and three thousand Serbs are believed to have been killed during the conflict. Some 3,000 people are still missing, of which 2,500 are Albanian, 400 Serbs, and 100 Roma.

Some of the worst massacres against civilian Albanians occurred after NATO started the bombing of Yugoslavia. Cuska massacre, Podujevo massacre, Velika Krusa massacre are some of the massacres committed by Serbian army, police, and paramilitary.

The war also resulted in destruction of property, including many historical buildings. According to a report compiled by the U.S.-based Kosovo Cultural Heritage Project, Serbian forces destroyed approximately one-third of the mosques in Kosovo. According to the report, other historic structures associated with the culture and religion of Kosovo's Albanian population had also been singled out for attack by Serbian forces. The report also noted that damage from Nato bombs was limited and that, after the withdrawal of Serbian forces, many orthodox churches were destroyed by Albanians. According to a report by the Institute for the Protection of the Cultural Monuments of Serbia, some 160 cultural monuments in Serbia-proper were seriously endangered, damaged, or destroyed by NATO bombs, including twenty-five monasteries, thirty-four churches, three mosques, one synagogue, forty objects of city architecture, seven objects of folk masonry, twenty-five town centers, thirteen archaeological sites, and sixteen memorial monuments.

== United Nations Administration ==
The emblem used in United Nations Administered Kosovo.

The Kosovo War ended on 10 June 1999 with the Serbian and Yugoslav governments signing the Kumanovo Agreement, which agreed to transfer governance of the province to the United Nations. A NATO-led Kosovo Force (KFOR) entered the province tasked with providing security to the UN Mission in Kosovo (UNMIK). The UN Security Council passed Resolution 1244 that placed Kosovo under transitional UN administration and authorized a NATO-led peacekeeping force.

Before and during the handover of power, an estimated 100,000 Serbs and other non-Albanians, mostly Romani, fled the province for fear of reprisals. In the case of the non-Albanians, the Roma in particular were regarded by many Albanians as having assisted the Serbs during the war. Many left along with the withdrawing Serbian security forces, expressing fears that they would be targeted by returning Albanian refugees and KLA fighters who blamed them for wartime acts of violence. Thousands more were driven out by intimidation, revenge attacks and a wave of crime after the war as KFOR struggled to restore order in the province. Almost immediately returning Kosovo Albanians attacked Kosovo Serbs, causing some 200,000–280,000 Serbs and other non-Albanians to flee (note: the current number of internally displaced persons is disputed, with estimates ranging from 65,000 to 250,000). Many displaced Serbs were afraid, at least initially, to return to their homes, even with UNMIK protection. By 2006 over 16,000 Serbs have returned to Kosovo.

In 2001, UNMIK promulgated a Constitutional Framework for Kosovo which established the Provisional Institutions of Self-Government (PISG), including an elected Kosovo Assembly, Presidency and office of Prime Minister. Kosovo held its first free, Kosovo-wide elections in late 2001 (municipal elections had been held the previous year). UNMIK oversaw the establishment of a professional, multi-ethnic Kosovo Police Service.

Large numbers of refugees from Kosovo continued to live in temporary camps and shelters in Serbia proper. In 2002, Serbia and Montenegro reported hosting 277,000 internally displaced people (the vast majority being Serbs and Roma from Kosovo), which included 201,641 persons displaced from Kosovo into Serbia proper, 29,451 displaced from Kosovo into Montenegro, and about 46,000 displaced within Kosovo itself, including 16,000 returning refugees unable to inhabit their original homes. Some sources put the figure far lower; the European Stability Initiative estimates the number of displaced people as being only 65,000, with another 128,000 Serbs remaining in Kosovo. The largest concentration is in the north of the province above the Ibar river, but an estimated two-thirds of the Serbian population in Kosovo continues to live in the Albanian-dominated south of the province.

In March 2004, Kosovo experienced its worst inter-ethnic violence since the Kosovo War. The unrest in 2004 was sparked by a series of minor events that soon cascaded into large-scale riots leading to several deaths, and the destruction of a large number of Orthodox churches and monasteries in the province, as ethnic Albanians clashed with ethnic Serbs. Several thousand more Kosovo Serbs were reported to have left their homes to seek refuge in Serbia proper or in the Serb-dominated north of Kosovo proper. Kosovo Police established a special investigation team to handle cases related to the 2004 unrest and according to Kosovo Judicial Council by the end of 2006 the 326 charges filed by municipal and district prosecutors for criminal offenses in connection with the unrest had resulted in 200 indictments: convictions in 134 cases, and courts acquitted eight and dismissed 28; 30 cases were pending. International prosecutors and judges handled the most sensitive cases.

International negotiations began in 2006 to determine the final status of Kosovo, as envisaged under UN Security Council Resolution 1244. Whilst Serbia's continued sovereignty over Kosovo is recognised by the international community, a clear majority of the province's population (which was mainly Albanian) would prefer independence. The UN-backed talks, led by UN Special Envoy Martti Ahtisaari, began in February 2006. Whilst progress was made on technical matters, both parties remained diametrically opposed on the question of status itself. In February 2007, Ahtisaari delivered a draft status settlement proposal to leaders in Belgrade and Pristina, the basis for a draft UN Security Council Resolution which proposes 'supervised independence' for the province. As of early July 2007, the draft resolution, which is backed by the United States, United Kingdom and other European members of the United Nations Security Council, had been rewritten four times to try to accommodate Russian concerns that such a resolution would undermine the principle of state sovereignty. Russia, which holds a veto in the Security Council as one of five permanent members, stated that it would not support any resolution which is not acceptable to both Belgrade and Pristina.

== Declaration of independence ==
After UN-sponsored negotiations failed to reach a consensus on an acceptable constitutional status, Kosovo declared independence on 17 February 2008.

== See also ==
- Kosovo status process
- Albanian nationalism in Kosovo
