= Miro Barešić =

Croatian murderer (1950–1991)

- Miroslav Barešić
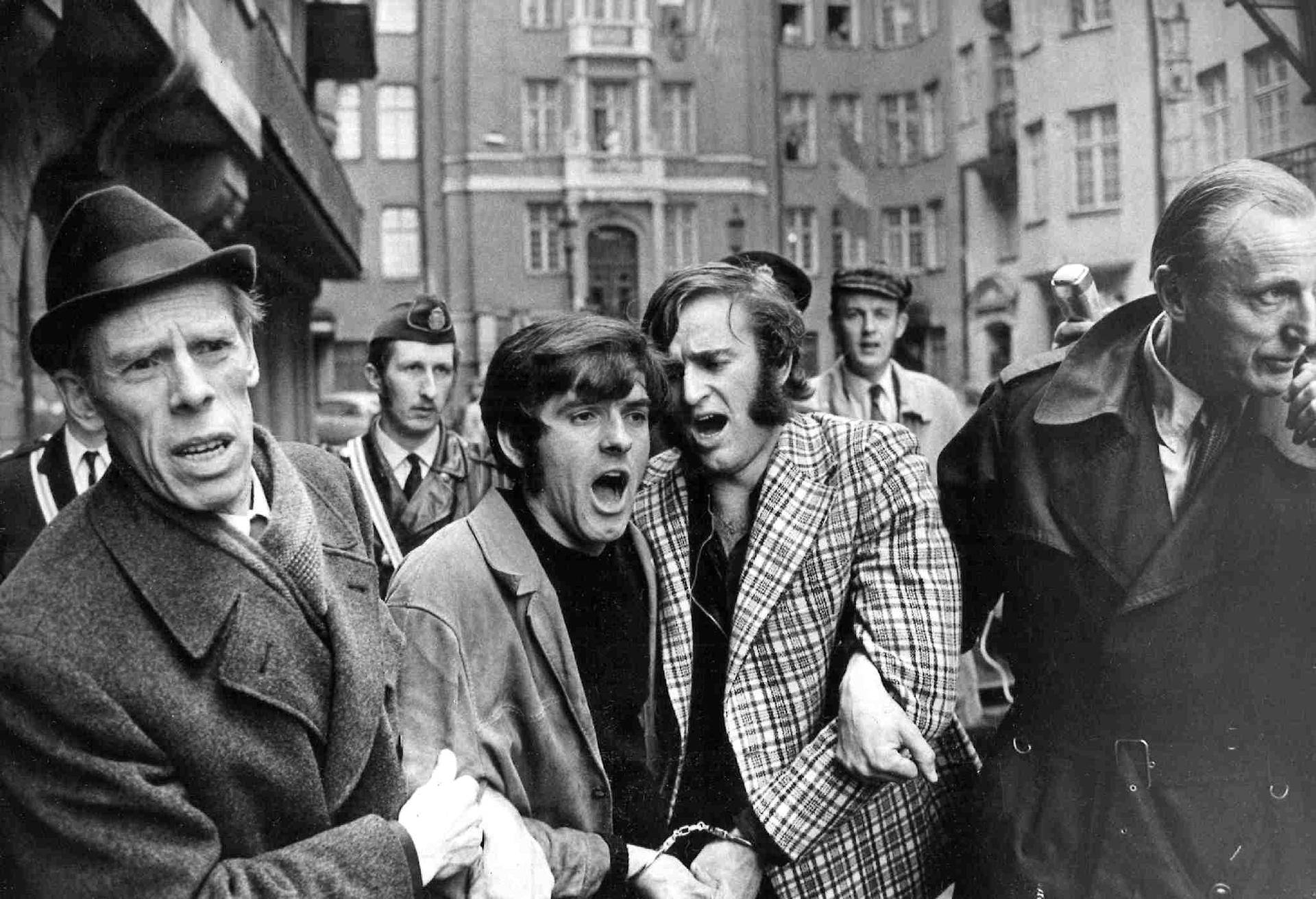
- Brajković and Barešić being arrested after the 1971 Yugoslav Embassy shooting
- Born: 10 September 1950; Šibenik, PR Croatia, FPR Yugoslavia
- Died: 31 July 1991 (aged 40); Miranje Donje, Croatia
- Cause of death: Killed in action
- Resting place: Mirogoj Cemetery, Zagreb, Croatia
- Other names: Toni Šarić, Tony Favik
- Organization: Croatian National Resistance
- Movement: Croatian nationalism
- Military career
- Allegiance: Croatia
- Branch: Croatian National Guard
- Service years: 1991
- Rank: Major (posthumously)
- Conflicts: Croatian War of Independence

Miro Barešić (10 September 1950 – 31 July 1991) was a Croatian émigré who, in 1971, murdered Yugoslav diplomat Vladimir Rolović in Sweden. He later served as a soldier in Paraguay and in the Croatian National Guard in 1991.

In 1969, Barešić was sentenced to six months in prison in Yugoslavia for avoiding military service, after which he left the country and joined the Croatian National Resistance movement. In 1971, he was convicted of the murder of Vladimir Rolović, Yugoslav ambassador to Sweden and former commander of the Goli Otok prison. He was released in 1972 as part of the conditions and demands by Croatian hijackers of a Sweden domestic flight. For several years, he lived in the United States and then Paraguay under a false identity. In 1980, he was extradited to Sweden and served the remaining seven years of his original sentence for the Rolović murder. He was released in 1987 and four years later, when the Croatian War of Independence began, he joined the Croatian National Guard. He was killed in action under suspicious circumstances in July 1991.

== Early life ==
Miro Barešić was born on 10 September 1950 in Šibenik, People's Republic of Croatia, part of Federal People's Republic of Yugoslavia. In 1968, as was required by any 18-year-old, Barešić was called to attend military service in the Yugoslav People's Army. He refused for political reasons to perform mandatory military service and was sentenced to six months in Goli Otok prison. In 1969, after the completion of his prison term, he left Yugoslavia for Italy where he was linked with members of the Croatian National Resistance movement, who assisted him. In Sweden, Barešić associated with people connected with the Croatian National Resistance and other Croatian extreme nationalists. He helped start a new organization, The Black Legion (Croatian: Crna Legija) in Sweden, to serve as a base for actions against Yugoslavia.

== Murder in the Yugoslav embassy ==
On 7 April 1971, Barešić and Anđelko Brajković drove in a rented car to Stockholm with two other partners involved in plotting an attack on the Yugoslav embassy in Sweden. Their plan was to kidnap Yugoslav ambassador Vladimir Rolović, former head of the Yugoslav Secret Police (UDBA) and former commander of Goli Otok, and exchange him for Miljenko Hrkać, a member of the Croatian Liberation Movement who had been sentenced to death in Yugoslavia for the 1968 bombing of a Belgrade cinema.

The two men walked into the embassy at 9:45 a.m. and pretended to look at some visas in the reception. Once they saw Rolović near the reception they drew their guns. Rolović then drew his own pistol but was subdued and knocked unconscious by Barešić. As Brajković tied Rolović to a chair with a rope around his hands and feet, and a belt around his throat, Barešić guarded the door while outside the building a mass of people, the media, police and paramedics arrived on the scene.

Barešić saw the police approaching. The original plan to take the ambassador hostage was abandoned as they expected the police to storm the building. The two conspirators heard the police moving in on the building and Brajković took his gun, put it in Rolović's mouth, and pulled the trigger. Shortly after, at 10:35, the two men surrendered to police. When being taken out from the murder scene in handcuffs the news teams of several media stations were filming the whole incident as Barešić kissed Brajković on his cheek and then began to yell "long live the Independent State of Croatia" and "long live Ante Pavelić" on the way to the parked police cars. Rolović died from his injuries a few days later. In 1971, Barešić and Brajković were convicted of murder and began serving their sentences at a Swedish high security prison.

== Release from prison to Spain ==
In 1972, Barešić and Brajković were released as part of a demand made by the hijackers of a domestic airline at Sweden's Bulltofta Airport. A group of Croatian terrorists led by Stipe Mikulić hijacked the aircraft, forced the Swedish authorities to refuel it using the passengers as leverage, and flew to Madrid. They surrendered themselves to the Spanish authorities once it was confirmed that Barešić was released from the Swedish prison and flown to Spain (then ruled by Francisco Franco). The hijackers received a 12-year prison sentence. Barešić was later acquitted of any involvement in the hijacking and released from Spanish custody after 19 months, during which time the Swedish authorities made no request to Spain for his extradition. In Madrid, the two men came in contact with the then-Ambassador of Paraguay to Spain, Rodney Elpidio Acevedo. After Barešić's release, the Spanish and Paraguayan governments, claiming his life was in danger by the UDBA, arranged for him to fly to Paraguay.

== Life in Paraguay and imprisonment in Sweden ==
Barešić obtained a Paraguayan passport under the name "Toni Šarić". He joined the Paraguayan armed forces and rose to the rank of captain, in the process also becoming a karate trainer. In 1977, Barešić was employed by the Paraguayan foreign service as the bodyguard for the Paraguayan ambassador to the United States. U.S. authorities then discovered his real identity, which forced him to move back to Paraguay. After an extortion ring that targeted Yugoslav immigrants came under scrutiny by American prosecutors, charges were brought against Barešić and he was extradited to face trial in New York. The defendants were acquitted, but in May 1980, Barešić was deported to Sweden to serve the remainder of his life sentence there.

Barešić's sentence was reduced from life to eighteen years in 1985. He was released in December 1987, after serving seven and a half years, and flown to Paraguay, accompanied by his wife and two children. He settled in Paraguay, and opened a martial arts club and a car repair shop.

== Return to Croatia and death ==
When the Croatian War of Independence broke out in 1991, Barešić returned to Croatia and led a unit subordinated to the Ministry of Defence in Zadar against the Yugoslav People's Army (JNA) and the SAO Krajina.

He was killed in the village of Miranje Donje near Benkovac on 31 July 1991. His body was discovered by a civilian on 5 August and turned over to the Croatian police by the JNA two days later. Barešić was buried in Miroševac cemetery in Zagreb under a pseudonym, and then reburied with full state honors in Mirogoj cemetery under his real name, and posthumously promoted to the rank of major. Then Croatian President Franjo Tuđman posthumously decorated him as a "knight".

The circumstances of Barešić's death are controversial. It was the subject of a criminal inquest of 2002, launched after Nikola Majstrović, author of a film dealing Barešić's death, filed a complaint with the Croatian State Attorney, and it concluded that Barešić was killed in an ambush prepared by the SAO Krajina special police. Two private investigators, on the other hand, claimed Barešić was killed by one of the men in his own unit, allegedly to cover up the identities of former Yugoslav secret police agents who had returned to Croatia since 1990 under the guise of political dissidents before Barešić identified them. A new formal inquest of the matter was launched by the State Attorney's Office in 2012, but did not produce additional findings.

== Legacy ==
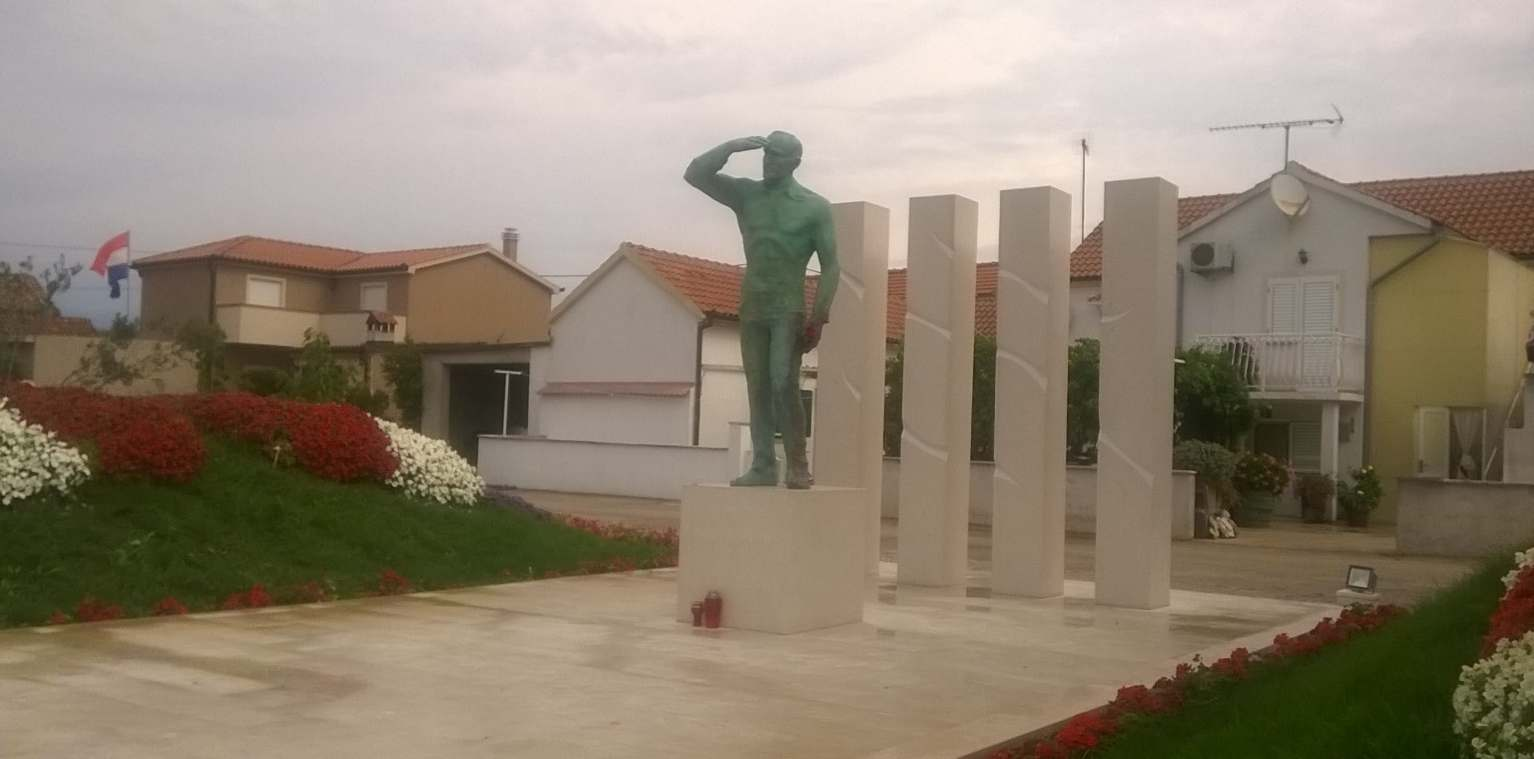
Statue of Miro Barešić in Drage, Croatia

On 31 July 2016, a statue of Barešić was erected in the village of Drage near Pakoštane. Government ministers Zlatko Hasanbegović and Tomo Medved, several members of the Parliament from HDZ, HSP AS and MOST, general Ante Gotovina, bishop Mile Bogović and many other political leaders were present at the unveiling of the monument. His statue was blessed by the Archbishop of Zadar. This event provoked a sharp reaction from the Governments of Serbia and Montenegro. The Serbian Minister of Internal Affairs said that the monument to Barešić "reminds of the rising of fascism and Ustašism in Croatia." The Swedish press reacted strongly, with reporters, historians and witnesses to the 1971 murder, expressing surprise or shock on hearing about the statue. On 7 August 2016, the monument was vandalized with red paint. The perpetrator was not apprehended.
