= Vladimir Rolović =

Yugoslav politician and diplomat (1916–1971)

- Born: 21 May 1916; Brčeli, Kingdom of Montenegro
- Died: 15 April 1971 (aged 54); Stockholm, Sweden
- Occupations: politician, diplomat
- Awards

Vladimir Rolović (21 May 1916 – 15 April 1971) was a Yugoslav politician, diplomat, and a former high officer of the State Security Administration (UDBA). Holder of the "Commemorative Medal of the Partisans of 1941" and as a former commander of the infamous Goli Otok prison, he was assassinated in 1971 while serving as the Yugoslav ambassador to Sweden by Anđelko Brajković and Miro Barešić, members of the Croatian National Resistance neo-Ustaša terrorist organization.

== Biography ==
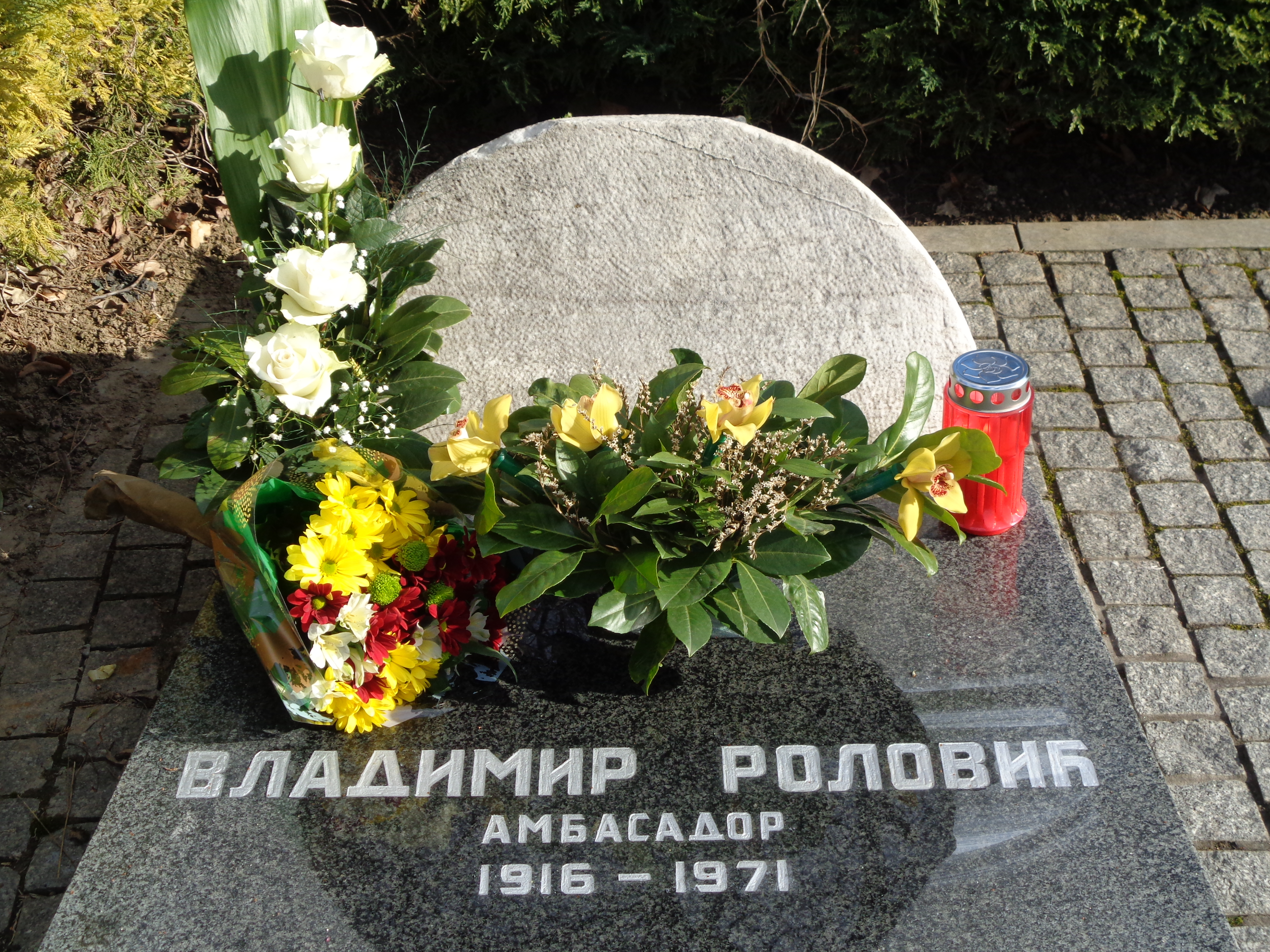
Vladimir Rolović's tombstone in Belgrade.

Rolović was born on 21 May 1916 in the village of Brčeli within Crmnica region near Bar. Born during World War I in a poor family, he spent his childhood in his home village, where he attended elementary school. Despite difficult conditions, he continued his education in Bar, Peć and Cetinje, and enrolled in the University of Belgrade's Faculty of Law.

In 1935, the 19-year-old became a member of SKOJ, the youth wing of the then-banned Yugoslav Communist Party (KPJ). Only several months later, in early 1936, he became a full-fledged member of the KPJ. Due to his involvement with the organization, he was arrested twice by the authorities of the Kingdom of Yugoslavia – first in 1935 in Cetinje and later in 1938 in Belgrade. Rolović continued his climb up the party ladder and in 1940, he was elected a member of the Provincial Committee of the Communist Party of Yugoslavia in Montenegro.

After the invasion and subsequent occupation of Kingdom of Yugoslavia by Nazi Germany and its allies in April 1941, Rolović was actively involved in preparations for an armed uprising in Montenegro. In December 1941, he participated in the attack on Pljevlja. He served as political commissioner of the First Montenegrin partisan battalion. He was also a director of the Political department of the First Dalmatian and Fifteenth Majevica Brigades and Seventeenth East-Bosnian Division of the Yugoslav Army.

He served as a member of the Montenegro government, as assistant of federal Minister of Foreign Affairs, member of the city Committee of the Communist Party of Belgrade and ambassador of Yugoslavia in Norway, Japan and finally in Sweden.

He was a commander of the Goli Otok prison used to incarcerate political prisoners.

In Stockholm on 7 April 1971, he was attacked by a terrorist group of Croatian National Resistance members in an attack on the Yugoslav embassy, and was mortally wounded. Eight days later, on 15 April, he succumbed to his injuries. The assassins Miro Barešić and Anđelko Brajović were caught and convicted in Sweden.

He was awarded the People's Hero of Yugoslavia gallantry medal on 9 April 1971, two days after getting wounded in Stockholm.

== Literature ==
- National heroes of Yugoslavia, Mladost, Belgrade, 1975.
