= Miljenko Hrkać =

Alleged Croatian terrorist

Miljenko Hrkać (2 October 1947 – 11 January 1978) was a Croatian man sentenced to death by a Yugoslav court which accused him of bombing the Belgrade cinema "20. oktobar" on 13 July 1968, which left one person dead and 89 others maimed or injured. He was also convicted of an attack on the Belgrade rail station on 25 September 1968, which left 13 people injured. He was executed on 11 January 1978.

== Origin and early life ==
An ethnic Croat, Hrkać was born in Mokro, Široki Brijeg, PR Bosnia and Herzegovina in 1947. There are conflicting reports of his trade, some sources identifying Hrkać as a carpenter, others as a mason, while some sources simply identify him as a "worker".

Hrkać may have had a daughter named Milijenka Hrkać. As of now, no report of a wife or a mother of the daughter is available.

== Belgrade cinema bombing ==
On 13 July 1968, at 21.05 CET, a bomb detonated in the Belgrade cinema "20. oktobar". One person was killed and 76-89 others injured, some seriously, including Magdalena Novaković, a schoolgirl who lost both legs as a result of the bombing. The bomb was placed under the sixth seat of the 16th row, during the movie Du rififi à Paname.

== Belgrade rail station bombing ==
On 25 September 1968, three explosives were detonated in the Belgrade rail station garderobe, leaving 9-13 people injured.

== Capture and death sentence ==
Hrkać was tried for the bombings of the cinema and at the rail station and sentenced to death by the Belgrade District Court on 23 December 1975. The verdict was confirmed by the Supreme Court of Serbia on 29 June 1976 and by the Federal Court on 30 December 1976. On 15 November 1977, the Clemency Commission of the Presidency of Yugoslavia unanimously rejected the request for clemency. Hrkać was executed by shooting on 11 January 1978 in the Belgrade prison. Hrkać had maintained his innocence for both of the bombings, and over the years, it has been suggested that he may have been wrongfully executed.

However, Amnesty International has recognized a theory that suggests Hrkać died of natural causes before the death sentence could be carried out, citing that, "Before his death, it is reported that his weight was half what it had been before he went to prison, that he had lost all his hair and had developed some symptoms of psychological disorder."
