= Croatian National Resistance =

Ustaše group in Spain (1955–1991)

- Hrvatski narodni otpor
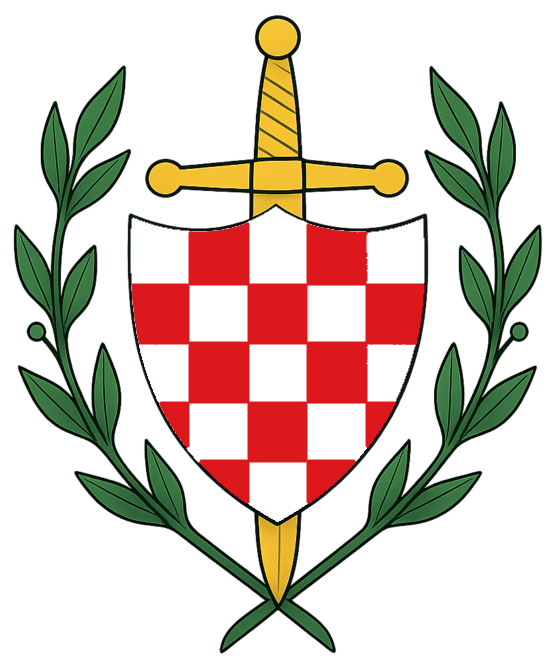
- Coat of Arms of Croatian national resistance
- Dates active: 1955–1991
- Ideology: Croatian ultranationalism Neo-fascism
- Status: Defunct

The Croatian National Resistance (Croatian: Hrvatski narodni otpor, HNO; Spanish: Resistencia Nacional Croata), also referred to as Otpor, was an Ustaša organization founded in 1955 in Spain. The HNO ran an armed organisation, Drina, which continued to be active well into the 1970s.

The organization operated between legitimate emigre functions and a thuggish underworld. Its leaders tried to distance the organization from the acts of the so-called renegade elements. It embraced a radical nationalist ideology that differed only marginally from Ustaše ideology.

The HNO had stated in their constitution that:

[We] regard Yugoslavism and Yugoslavia as the greatest and only evil that has caused the existing calamity... We therefore consider every direct or indirect help to Yugoslavia as treason against the Croatian nation... Yugoslavia must be destroyed—be it with the help of the Russians or the Americans, of Communists, non-Communists or anti-Communists—with the help of anyone willing the destruction of Yugoslavia: destroyed by the dialectic of the word, or by dynamite—but at all costs destroyed.

The organization published its own magazine, Otpor. It existed until 1991.

== History ==
During WWII, Croatia was occupied by Nazi Germany. Under the Nazi-supported Ustaša regime, the nation proclaimed independence and was named the Independent State of Croatia (NDH). During this time, the Ustaša political party, headed by the fascist leader Ante Pavelić, controlled Croatian leadership. The NDH was supported by the Axis powers and participated in the creation and use of concentration and extermination camps. While this puppet state adapted the anti-semitic policy of the Axis powers, their goal was also to ethnically cleanse all Serbian and Roma people through acts of systematic extermination. It is thought that the war crimes and the Holocaust in Croatia during WWII committed by the Ustaša regime is what spurred some anti-Croat sentiment within some parts of the Serbian populations later on.

After WWII, Yugoslavia became a socialist state. This communist state under Tito branded the different Croat separatist groups as fascist terrorists with no goal other than to destroy the state. While this view of the Croat diaspora population was largely slanted, it did describe a small number of loosely organized groups which were in line with the Ustaše.

Otpor existed for over three decades, and while it never had more than a few thousand members worldwide, it linked a variety of notable Croatian nationalists. Otpor branches on four continents at times splintered, notably the Argentinian one under the leadership of Dinko Šakić. Šakić had lived in Argentina between 1947 and 1956, and then between 1959 and 1998.

One of the most ambitious international initiatives of Croatian National Resistance in the early 1960s was spearheaded by Mahmoud K. Muftić, who served as the architect of a diplomatic campaign to gain Arab support for the formal recognition of the exiled Croatian state and to secure Saudi material assistance in "the fight against communism and for the liberation of Croatia." He led negotiations with Saudi Arabia aimed at securing support for admitting this hypothetical government-in-exile to the Arab League as an “Islamic state,” an effort that came close to succeeding and was carried out through a form of guerrilla diplomacy in coordination with the Muslim Brotherhood. Separately, Muftić launched a plan to form combat units of Bosnian exiles, to be trained by the Brotherhood for an armed struggle against Yugoslavia, a project that ultimately failed. His growing influence in these efforts led to tensions within Croatian National Resistance, and he eventually fell out with Vjekoslav Luburić after the Saudi government pushed for Luburić's removal and replacement with a Bosnian Muslim, Ibrahim Pirić-Pjanić, as a condition for continued support. Luburić responded by accusing Muftić of having previously worked for British intelligence.

The HNO was banned in Germany in 1976 because of their links to Zvonko Bušić and others.

In 1991, a former leader of Otpor joined the Croatian Ministry of Defence and used his underground connections to try to obtain weaponry at the time the Croatian War of Independence was starting. In August 1991, the U.S. Customs Service arrested four members of Otpor from Chicago for attempting to procure illegal weapons, including anti-aircraft missiles, and ship them to Croatia. The men were Douglas J. Russell, Branko Majstoric, Ivan Beslic, and Andjelko Jurkovic. The trial was delayed for several years. Out on bail, Jurkovic, 52, was killed in a car accident on April 16, 1994. At trial, Russell was acquitted, while Majstoric and Beslic pleaded guilty. After the defense argued that the two were motivated by patriotism, not greed, the judge sentenced them to three years of supervised release each.

== Leadership ==
Ante Pavelić was the leader of the Independent State of Croatia, NDH, from 1941 to 1945. After fleeing Yugoslavia for war crimes committed during WWII, he spent some time in Austria and Italy before relocating to Argentina with the majority of the remaining NDH leadership and an estimated 5,000 to 15,000 Ustaše sympathizers. He established the Croatian Liberation Movement (HOP) in Buenos Aires.

Dinko Šakić was in charge of the Argentinian faction in the 1970s. In 1998, he was extradited to Croatia, where he was put on trial for war crimes and crimes against humanity. In 1999, Šakić was found guilty and sentenced to 20 years in prison. He died in prison in 2008.

Vjekoslav "Maks" Luburic was one of Pavelić's lieutenants during WWII, and served as a concentration camp administrator. Luburić broke off and formed his own group, Otpor-HNO in 1955. This split was due to the fact that Pavelić was willing to give up some historically Croatian land in exchange to reestablish an independent Croatia. The working relationship between the two men was a long-standing one, beginning in the 1930s with the Ustashe movement. In 1969, Luburić was assassinated by the Yugoslav secret police, the UDBA.

== Attacks ==
A number of attacks against Yugoslavia were organized by the Ustasha emigration, including the 1971 killing of ambassador Vladimir Rolović by Miro Barešić and Anđelko Brajković.

Otpor has taken credit for two murders associated with their group and is suspected of one more, according to the Global Terrorism Database (GTD). All three incidents occurred in 1978 in the US within months of each other. The first attack was against Anthony Cikoja on September 28, 1978. Cikoja was a Yugoslavian immigrant, shot and killed by someone in a waiting car outside his home in Greenburgh, New York. This attack happened three months after Cikoja had received a letter from the "Croatian Nationalist Army", demanding a payment of $5,000 towards the cause for independence. The letter also threatened death if he refused. At least 15 other Yugoslav immigrants in the area had received similar letters.

The next incident attributed to Otpor is a firebombing on October 4, 1978. Daniel Nikolic, a Croatian-American businessman, received a letter similar to the one given to Cikoja, demanding money. When he did not respond, his cabinet business was firebombed.

The third and final incident reported in the GTD was on November 22, 1978. This incident was similar to the previous two: the target, Krizan Brkic, also received an extortion letter demanding that he contribute money towards the cause for independence. He was shot and killed outside his home in Glendale, California by Otpor member Ante Caran, on the advice of fellow member Marijan Rudela. The suppressed pistol used by Caran to commit the murder was given to him by Miro Biosic for an unsuccessful assassination attempt on Mario Forgiarini, a wealthy recipient of an extortion letter.

While these are the only attacks reported in the GTD, this does not mean that these incidents were the only attacks perpetrated by the group. It has been suggested that Optor often hire people unrelated to the group to carry out attacks from their headquarters in Chicago. The primary targets of these attacks are Yugoslavian travel agencies and diplomatic facilities. Book bombs, or books hollowed out with explosive centers, were the weapon of choice for Otpor.

On May 23, 1979, a pipe bomb killed Otpor members Marijan Rudela and Zvonko Zimac in a pickup truck in the San Pedro district of Los Angeles. Another pipe bomb was recovered from the scene. The FBI believed the bomb detonated accidentally; it was intended for the homes of two Croatians who had previously received extortion letters. The two men had been parked only 70 feet from the home of extortion victim Martin Balov. It was the third bombing of its type in the Los Angeles area. Herbert D. Clough, the special agent in charge of the FBI's Los Angeles field office, said the bomb in the pickup truck was similar to those used in two other bombings. After the incidents were publicized, Croatians from across the United States came forward to report extortion letters.

In December 1980, Ante Caran was arrested by federal authorities on weapons charges. In 1981, ten Croatian nationalists were indicted by the U.S. government on racketeering charges: Mile Markic, Milan Bagaric, Ante Ljubas, Vinko Logarusic, Ranko Primorac, Drago Sudar, Andjelko Jakic, Ivan Misetic, Miro Biosic, and Mile Boban. Markic was described by prosecutors as the "de facto leader of Otpor in the United States," while Ljubas was described as the "field general". In exchange for immunity on state murder charges, Caran agreed to plead guilty to civil rights violations for killing Brkzic, and testify for the prosecution.

Also in December 1980, another seven Otpor members were charged with conspiring to carry out an assassination and several bombings. Of those charges, five were convicted, including Ivan Cale, the head of the New York chapter of Otpor. Cale was sentenced to 35 years in prison. Codefendant Franjo Ivic was sentenced to 30 years in prison, while the other two, Nedjelko Sovulj and Stipe Ivkosic, were each sentenced to 20 years in prison. Ivkosic was released from prison on September 28, 1987. Ivic was released on October 10, 1995. Cale was released on April 24, 1998.

In May 1982, Markic, Bagaric, Ljubas, Logarusic, Primorac, and Sudar were found guilty. The following month, Ljubas and Primorac were each sentenced to 40 years in prison, Markic and Bagaric were each sentenced to 30 years in prison, and Logarusic and Sudar were each sentenced to 20 years in prison. In July, Ante Caran was sentenced to 15 years in prison. Markic was released from prison on March 11, 1988. Sudar was released on March 9, 1992. Logarusic was released on September 8, 1993. Bagaric was released on October 18, 1999. Ljubas was released on August 6, 2004. Primorac was released on February 22, 2005.

== Sources ==
- Hockenos, Paul (2003). Homeland Calling: Exile Patriotism and the Balkan Wars. Ithaca, New York: Cornell University Press. ISBN 978-0-8014-4158-5.
