= Malmö Bulltofta Airport =

Former airport of Malmö, Scania, Sweden (1923–1972)

Malmö Bulltofta Airport Malmö-Bulltofta flygplats
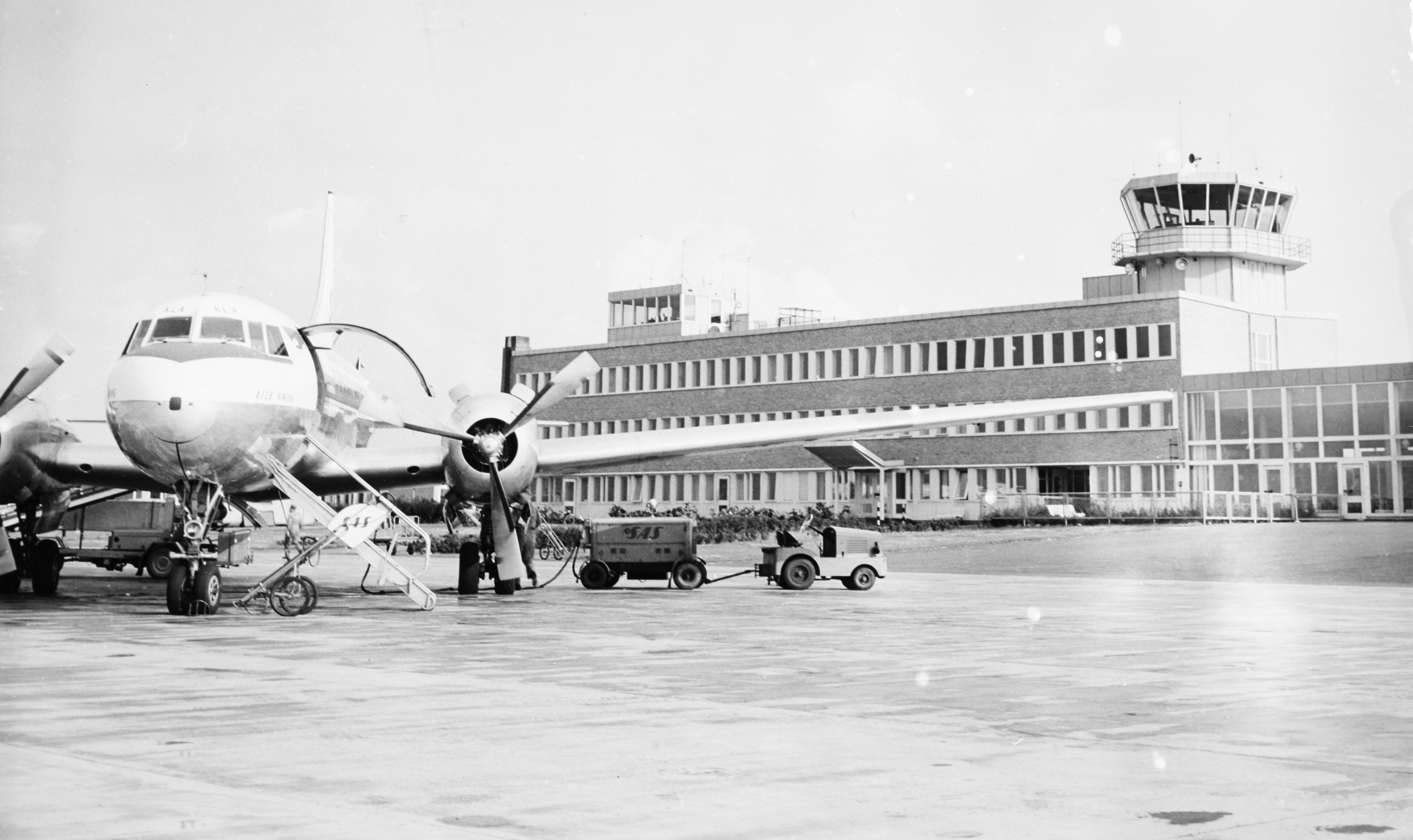
- Bulltofta Airport in the 1960s.
- IATA: MMA; ICAO: ESMM

Summary
- Airport type: Defunct
- Serves: Malmö
- Location: Bulltofta, Kirseberg
- Opened: September 1923
- Closed: 2 December 1972
- Coordinates: 55°36′18″N 13°3′35″E

Map
- Location within Skåne County

Runways
Direction	Length		Surface
Direction	m	ft	Surface
06/24	1,900	6,233	Asphalt

Statistics (multi)
- Passengers (1926): 6,000
- Movements (1926): 2,000
- Passengers (1964): 90,000

Malmö Bulltofta Airport (IATA: MMA, ICAO: ESMM) was the main airport for the city of Malmö, Scania, Sweden, from 1923 to 1972. Located in the Malmö city district of Kirseberg, the area has since been converted into a major park and commercial development, and this part of Sweden is now served by Malmö Airport, and Copenhagen Airport, Denmark.

Bulltofta airport's history began in 1914, when the Bulltofta heath was the site of a 3-team ballooning competition. Plans to develop the airport began in 1917 and construction was completed in 1923. Service began in 1924 with the routes Malmö–Copenhagen, the world's shortest, and Malmö–Hamburg (Germany). During the 1930s, Bulltofta became an important European airport, with flights to Great Britain, France, and the Netherlands. This, despite the runways remaining unpaved until 1952.

During World War II, the airfield served as the base for the Scania Wing (F 10), whose main task was to intercept German and Allied aircraft violating Swedish airspace. Because of the proximity of Malmö to the German coast, Sweden's declared neutrality, and an agreement between the American Bomber Command and the Swedish government, many heavily damaged Allied bomber aircraft came to land at Bulltofta instead of attempting to make it back to their own airfields in England. These emergency landings occurred mostly during the spring and summer of 1944.

The 1950s and 1960s saw the arrival of mass tourism and jet aircraft, which Bulltofta Airport was too small to accommodate, and it had become a source of noise pollution for the surrounding area. A new airport was needed further away from Malmö. Completed and opened in 1972, Malmö Airport is located 28 kilometres (17 mi) east of Malmö, in Sturup. Also in 1972, Bulltofta Airport was involved in a hijacking incident.

== Aftermath ==
Now the terminal still exist on Cederstörmsgatan 3, A piece of runway still exist near AB Bultoftabanan
