= List of aircraft operated by Scandinavian Airlines =

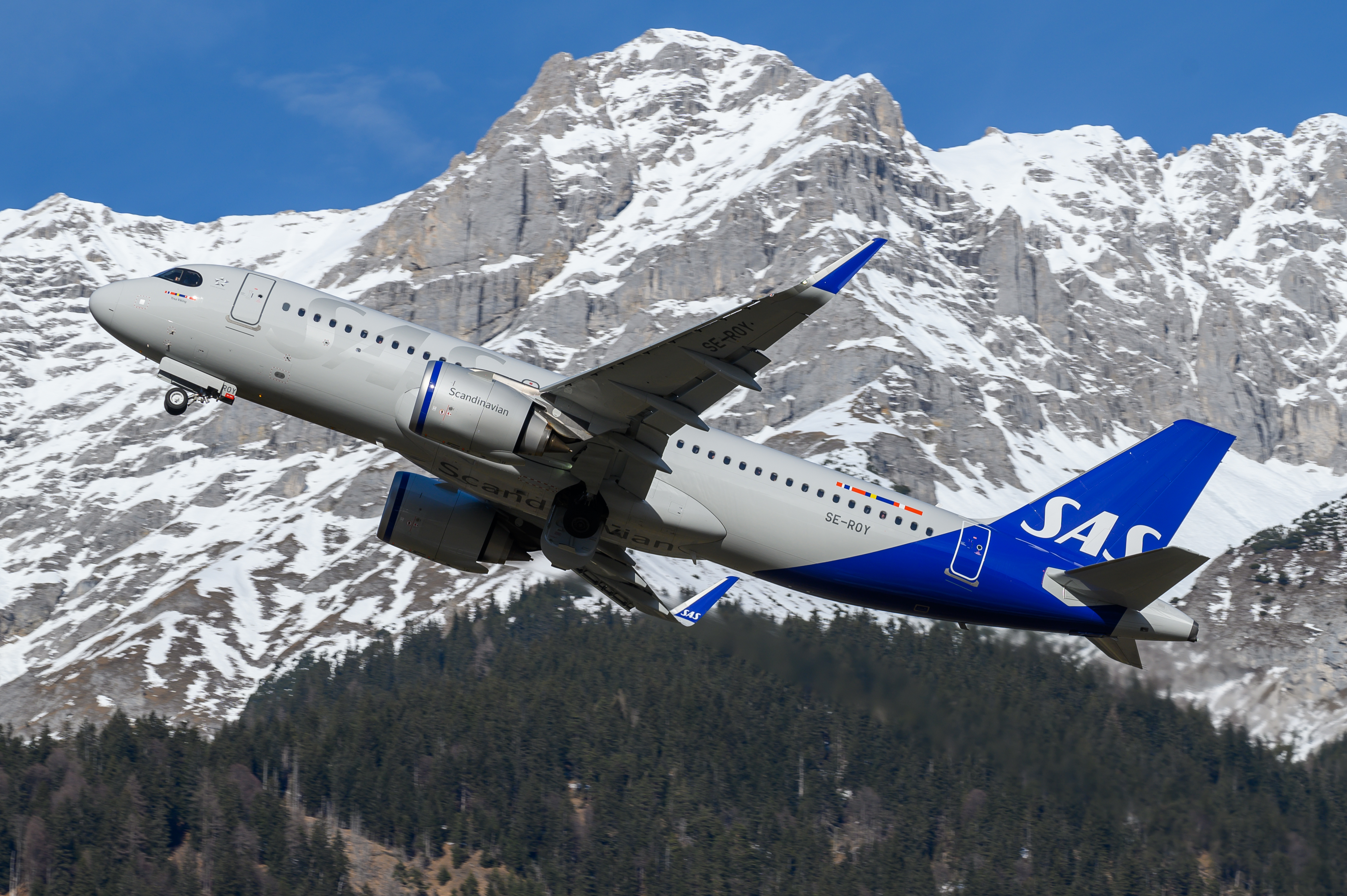
Airbus A320neo in the airline's latest livery

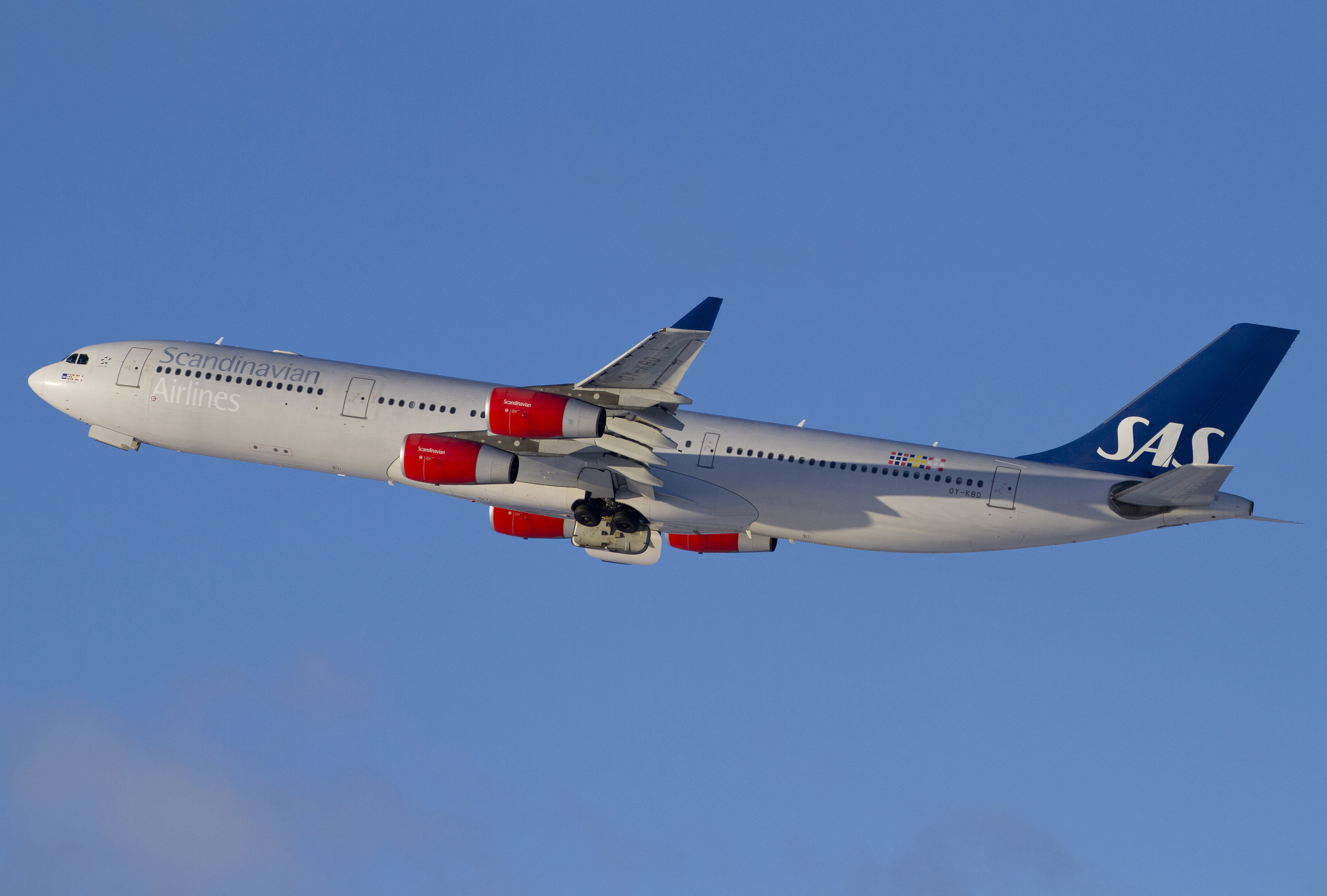
Airbus A340-300 in the airline's previous and most common livery

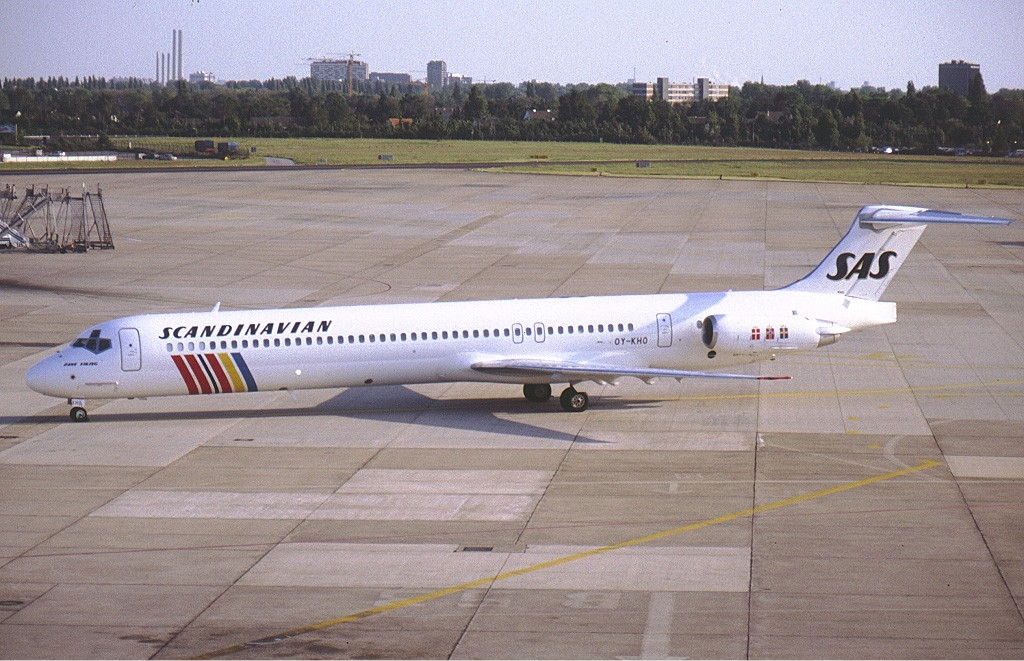
McDonnell Douglas MD-81 in 1991 in the intermediate "Carlzon livery. This plane would later crash as Scandinavian Airlines Flight 751 in 1991.

Scandinavian Airlines System (SAS) is the national airline of Denmark, Norway, and Sweden. Headquartered in Sigtuna outside Stockholm, Sweden, it operates out of three main hubs, Copenhagen Airport, Stockholm-Arlanda Airport and Oslo Airport, Gardermoen. Owned by the eponymous SAS Group, the airline transported 22.9 million passengers to 90 destinations on an average of 683 flights daily in 2011. As of February 2021, SAS utilizes 164 aircraft—jetliners and turboprops—consisting of 64 Boeing 737, 28 Bombardier CRJ900 operated by Nordica and CityJet, 44 Airbus A319/A320/A321, 9 Airbus A330, 8 Airbus A350 and 10 ATR 72s operated by Nordica and FlyBe. In addition, there are 2 Bombardier CRJ1000s leased from Air Nostrum.

The airline has operated over 700 aircraft throughout its history. It was a loyal customer of Douglas Aircraft Company and its successor McDonnell Douglas, operating 290 aircraft and all major models from the DC-3 through the MD-90, except for the MD-11 and the MD-95 (AKA: Boeing 717-200). Boeing is the second-largest manufacturer, with 127 aircraft, of which 105 were 737s. Other manufacturers have been Fokker (51 aircraft), Bombardier (40), Airbus (29), Convair (22), Sud Aviation (21), Saab (14), Vickers (9), ATR (6), British Aerospace (3), British Aircraft Corporation (2), Junkers (2), and Shorts (2). SAS has been the launch customer of the Saab Scandia, the Sud Aviation Caravelle, the McDonnell Douglas DC-9-20 and -40 and the Boeing 737-600. SAS was the sole customer of the DC-9-20; the DC-9-40 served SAS for 34 years—longer than any other model. Fourteen aircraft have been involved in hull-loss accidents, four of which were fatal.

SAS started as a cooperation between Norwegian Air Lines (DNL), Aerotransport (ABA), Swedish Intercontinental Airlines (SILA) and Danish Air Lines (DDL), who created Overseas Scandinavian Airlines System (OSAS) in 1946 and European Scandinavian Airlines System (ESAS) two years later. The airlines merged to create the SAS consortium in 1951. In the early years, SAS would rapidly purchase the newest intercontinental aircraft and gradually relegate them to European and then domestic service. The Caravelle was introduced in 1959 as SAS' first jetliner; intercontinental jet services commenced with the Douglas DC-8 the following year. The consortium created Scanair as a charter sister company in 1961. SAS Commuter was created in 1984 to operate regional airliners. The last such aircraft were retired in 2010. SAS bought its main competitors Linjeflyg of Sweden in 1993 and Braathens of Norway in 2001; the latter was merged to operate as SAS Braathens in Norway between 2004 and 2007.

== Livery ==
During the negotiations to create OSAS, the airlines quickly agreed that they would need a common profile and naming style. Referencing Vikings allowed the airline to play on a common history between the Scandinavian countries while giving a global distinctive and recognizable mark. The aircraft were painted with a livery consisting of a dragon's head, iconic of the Viking longships, in combination with a cheatline which intersected with the windows, such as to visualize the shields hung on the side of the longships.

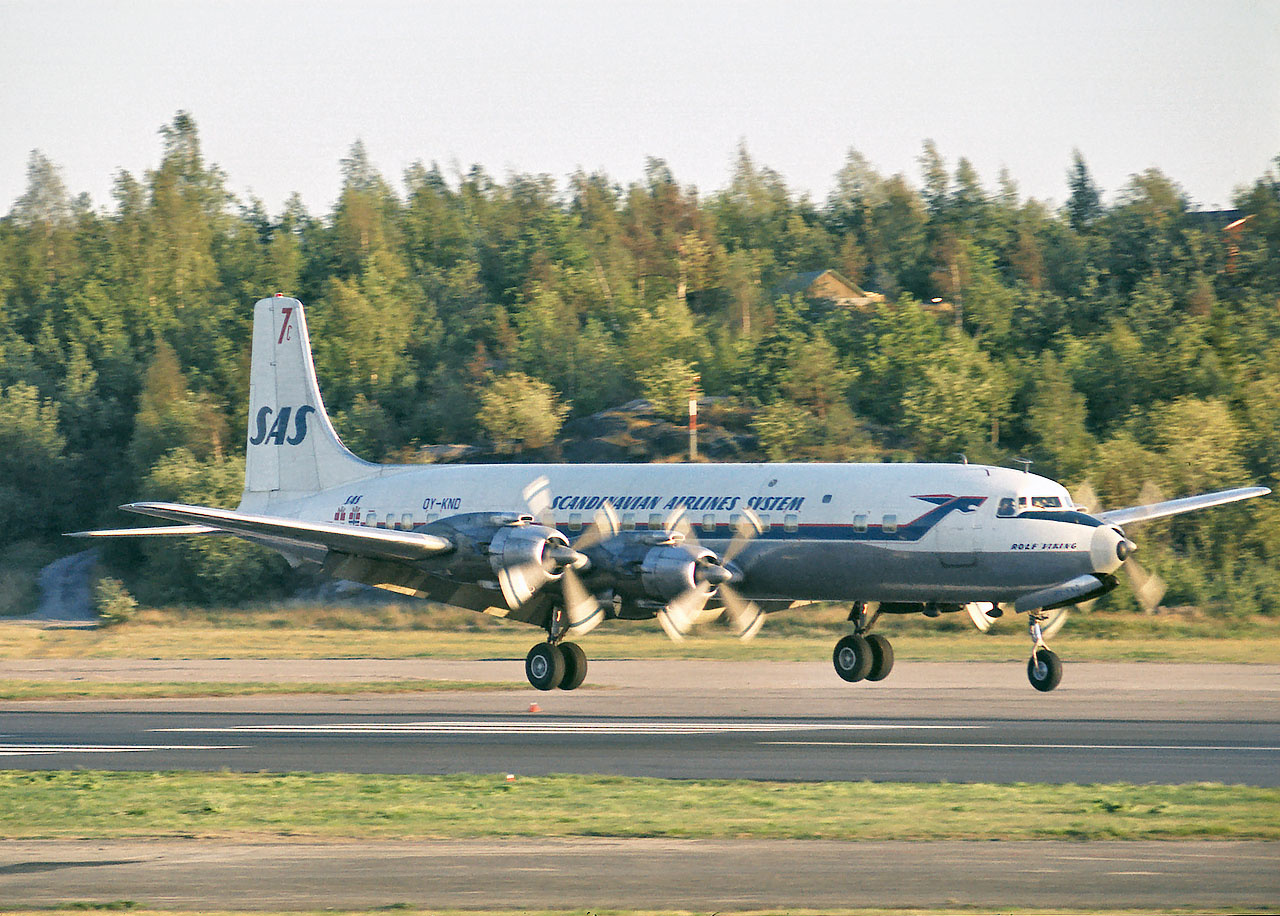
Douglas DC-7C Seven Seas in 1967, in SAS' original Viking livery

After Jan Carlzon's appointment as chief executive officer in 1981, he introduced a "new corporate identity" for the airline. In addition to a change of operating policy, it gave the airline a new graphical identity and livery. Carlzon was especially opposed to the Viking markings, as he believed people did not understand the dragon head reference and otherwise associated Vikings with pillage and rape. Early proposals called for green aircraft—considered neutral in relation to the Scandinavian national colors. The rebranding job was then issued to Landor Associates, who initially proposed the "Royal Scandinavian" brand with an oriental design, but this was discarded. The roll-out of the "Carlzon livery", which took place on 12 April 1983, saw a white body with slanted vertical stripes in the Scandinavian flags' colors.

SAS' current livery was first presented in September 1998 with the introduction of the Boeing 737 Next Generation. Part of a company-wide new identity, SAS 2000+, the airframes were given a white body, "Scandinavian" was replaced with "Scandinavian Airlines", the vertical stabilizer was painted blue, and the engines were red. The three national flags with crowns were replaced with a matrix representing the Scandinavian flags. Operations in Norway were branded SAS Braathens between 2004 and 2007, receiving a distinct livery based on the main SAS scheme.

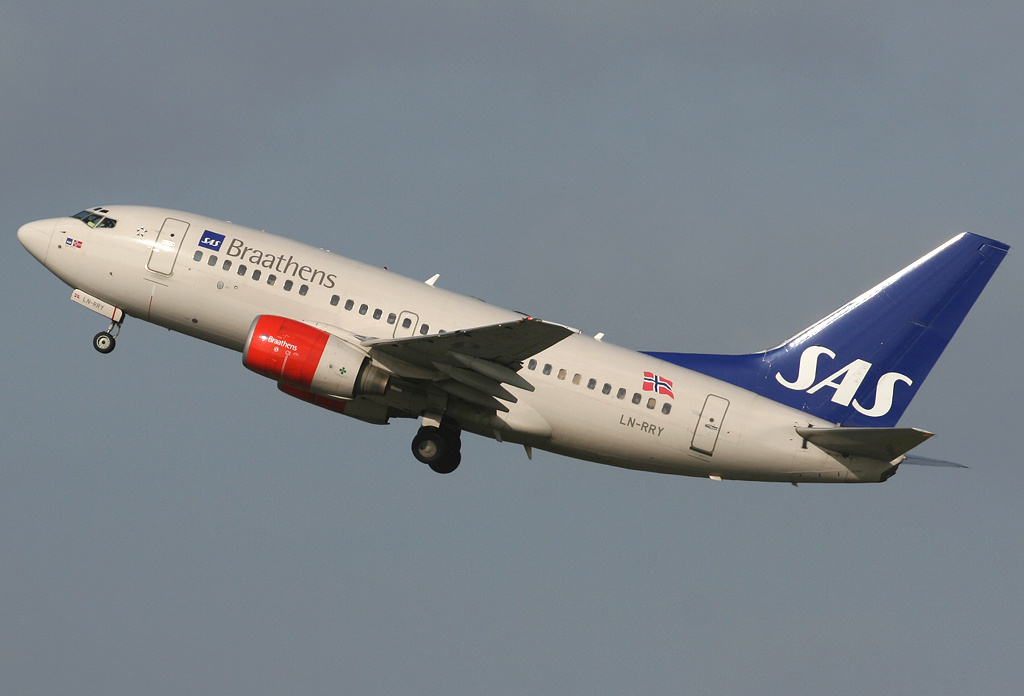
SAS' operations in Norway were under the SAS Braathens brand between 2004 and 2007, here shown on a Boeing 737-600.

A number of special paint jobs have been carried out. In the mid-1990s, SAS started a scheme to cover MD-80 in single colors overlaid with small, white aircraft silhouettes, but the project was abandoned after two aircraft. As SAS was one of the main sponsors of the 1994 Winter Olympics in Lillehammer, it painted one aircraft in a Lillehammer '94 scheme. Similarly, a Copenhagen '96 scheme was painted for Copenhagen's term as the European Capital of Culture. Since 2002, SAS has painted selected aircraft in a Star Alliance livery. With the delivery of the A319 in 2006, one aircraft was delivered in a retro Viking scheme.

== Naming ==
DDL and ABA had given their aircraft geographic names, such as DDL's Dania and Jutlandia and ABA's Svealand and Lappland. DNL had named their aircraft for Norwegian folklore and animals, such as Askeladden and Valkyrien. ABA introduced animal names, such as Falken, from the 1930s. SILA originally gave "Yankee names", such as Jim and Bob, later changing to winds, such as Nordan and Monsun.

OSAS' Viking concept resulted in the aircraft being named in the format "Foo Viking", such as Dana Viking and Olav Viking, where the first part was the given name of a historical king and chieftain from the Viking Age. Names were selected by the Fleet Development Division in cooperation with the University of Oslo. With the creation of the consortium, five rules were formulated for the naming: the larger the aircraft, the more prominent Viking it was to be named after; aircraft were to be named for kings, chieftains, seafarers, and scribes from the Viking Age; names of gods in Norse mythology were not used; names of non-Scandinavian origin were not used; and names containing the Scandinavian letters æ, ä, ø, ö, and å were omitted.

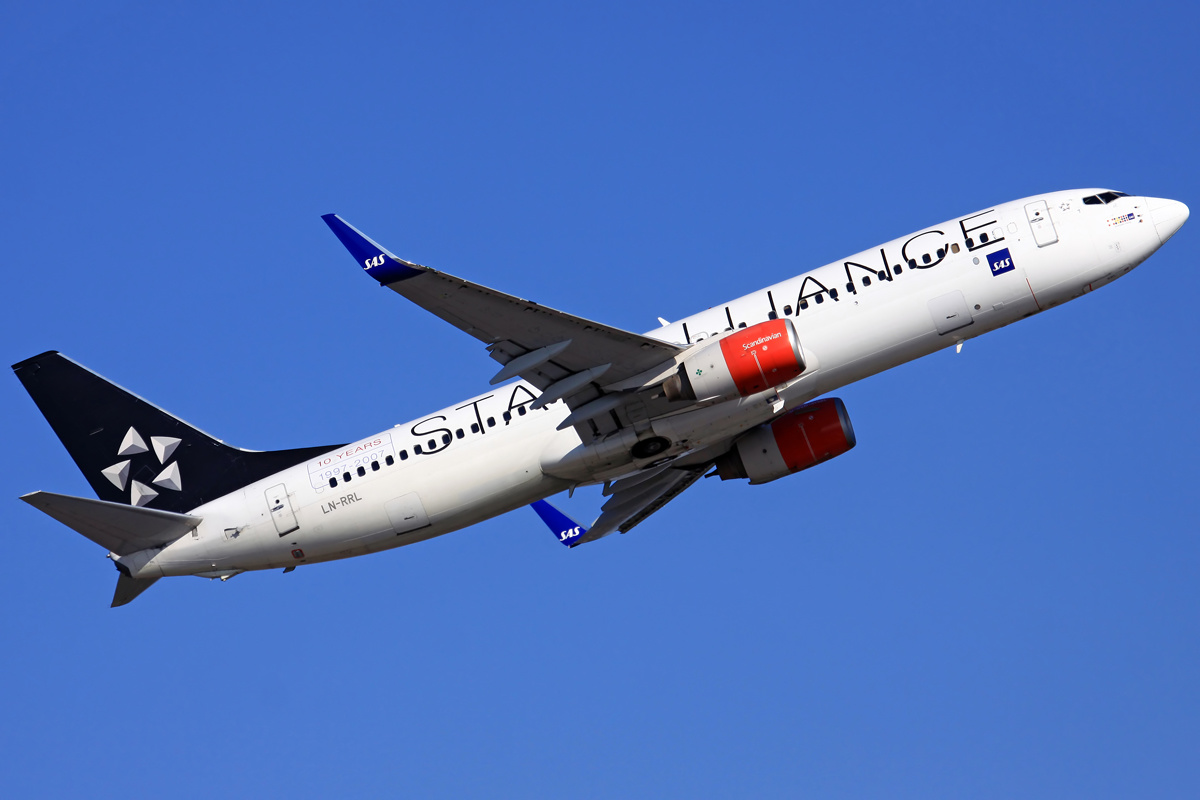
Boeing 737-800 aircraft in Star Alliance livery

A naming exception was Huge Viking, which was used for a Boeing 747. Huge was the quickest being in Norse mythology, but the name also played on the word's English meaning. SAS reuses the names from retired aircraft, except for those of crashed aircraft. Because of oversights, the names Agnar and Rane have, however, been reused. A similar naming convention, albeit using the full name of kings, was used by Braathens SAFE of Norway and Loftleiðir of Iceland. As Carlzon was opposed to the Viking references, he also proposed that the names be abolished. The executive management reverted its decision following massive protests from within the airline. Female aircraft names were introduced by Scanair in 1980, who gave them to all their Douglas DC-8s. SAS followed suit in 1989, when the entire series of Boeing 767 was named for prominent female Vikings. Scandinavian letters were introduced from the 1990s. SAS Commuter's Norwegian Fokker 50 aircraft were given names for places in Norway, such as Lakselv.

== Aircraft ==
The list includes aircraft operated in the European Scandinavian Airlines System pool, operated by Aerotransport, Norwegian Air Lines, and Danish Air Lines, by the consortium Overseas Scandinavian Airlines System, the consolidated Scandinavian Airlines System (later Scandinavian Airlines), and the SAS-branded SAS Commuter and SAS Braathens. It excludes other airlines within the SAS Group not branded as "SAS" or "Scandinavian", including Scanair, Spanair, Blue1 and Widerøe.

The list includes the manufacturer, model, the total quantity operated by SAS (the peak quantity may be lower), the current quantity operated as of October 2018, the number of passengers (pax), and the years the first aircraft entered (start) and last aircraft retired (end) from service.

List of Scandinavian Airlines aircraft
Aircraft	Image	Quantity	Current	Pax	Start	End	Notes	Ref(s).
Douglas DC-4 Skymaster	Four-engined piston aircraft	9	0	28–62	1946	1956	The aircraft were initially ordered by SILA, but, by the time of delivery, ownership was distributed between the members of OSAS. It was used for intercontinental traffic for two years, but the lack of pressure cabin made it relegated to European flights with the delivery of the DC-6. They were replaced by the Saab Scandia and SAS was able to sell the DC-4 for more than the purchase price.	
Douglas DC-3 Dakota	Two-engined piston aircraft	47	0	21	1948	1957	ABA, DDL and DNL all bought used Douglas C-47 Skytrain from the US Air Force and converted them to civilian airliners. The aircraft was the domestic and European workhorses for the airlines and served as the main haulier with the establishment of ESAS. All of SAS' aircraft were received at the airline's establishment.	
Vickers-Armstrongs VC.1B Viking	—	5	0	21–38	1948	1949	The aircraft were originally bought by DDL, who used them both for domestic and European routes. They were taken into use by ESAS at its creation but were sold after two Vikings crashed into Øresund.	
Junkers Ju 52/3m	Three-engined seaplane	2	0	14–16	1948	1956	The seaplanes were confiscated from the Luftwaffe by DNL after the Second World War and used on coastal routes from Trondheim through Northern Norway to Kirkenes. Both aircraft were grounded with their retirement from SAS.	
Short Brothers S.25 Sandringham Mk VI	Four-engined amphibious aircraft	2	0	37	1948	1951	The Ju 52 could not be used during winter because of the harsher weather and waves, resulting in DNL purchasing three ex-Royal Air Force amphibious aircraft for the coastal Northern Norway route—an area that completely lacked airstrips. All three of the original aircraft were written off in accidents and it was two follow-up purchases that were transferred to ESAS.	
Douglas DC-6 Cloudmaster	Four-engined piston aircraft	12	0	48–63	1948	1960	SILA originally ordered the Boeing 377 Stratocruiser to replace the unpressurized DC-4 on intercontinental routes, but delays at Boeing resulted in SAS ordering the Cloudmaster instead. One aircraft perished in 1948 in the Northwood mid-air collision. The aircraft remained the flagships of the fleet until 1952 when the intercontinental routes were taken over by the DC-6B. They were then used on European flights until being sold.	
Saab 90A-2 Scandia	Twin-engined piston aircraft	8	0	32	1950	1958	ABA ordered ten Scandias in 1948, under political pressure to purchase a Swedish aircraft. The only other purchaser of the aircraft was Aerovias Brasil. By the time they were delivered, the DC-4 had been put into European routes, diminishing the need for the Scandia and resulting in only eight aircraft being delivered. They were mostly used on the capital triangle and to Helsinki, as well as some European routes and domestically in Sweden and Northern Norway. Its main advantage over the DC-3 was its lower operating costs. All aircraft were sold to VASP.	
Douglas DC-6B Cloudmaster	Four-engined piston aircraft	14	0	58–82	1952	1961	The B-series was a lengthened, more economical and longer-ranged version of the DC-6, from which it took over intercontinental operations. In combination with innovations within navigation, the increased range allowed SAS to become the first airline to fly the polar route, which from 1954 connected Copenhagen and Los Angeles. Towards the end of their service life, many were leased to Thai Airways. They were retired with the introduction of intercontinental jet aircraft.	
Douglas DC-7C Seven Seas	Four-engined piston aircraft	14	0	80–98	1956	1967	Market conditions forced SAS to purchase the aircraft to keep up with the other major players, despite that the airline knew that intercontinental jets would make the DC-7 obsolete within few years. SAS was the first European airline to use the model, which allowed non-stop flights to New York. Branded by SAS as the Global Express, the aircraft also allowed SAS to start a service to Tokyo via Anchorage. From the 1960s, the DC-7 operated medium- and short-haul services, and some were converted to freighters before being scrapped.	
Convair CV-440 Metropolitan	Two-engined piston aircraft	20	0	52–56	1956	1976	The Metropolitan was bought to replace the DC-3 and Scandia on short-haul flights, as they both lacked pressure cabins. SAS was among the first customers of the CV-440 variant, which at first entered service on the inter-Scandinavian and European hauls, and later moved to domestic services. Towards the end of their service life, most of the aircraft were sold to Linjeflyg. As of 2002, it is the only SAS' model to never have had a single accident.	
Vickers-Armstrongs V.779D Viscount	—	4	0	48	1959	1961	Fred. Olsen Airtransport bought four Viscounts in 1957, and between 1959 and 1961 had a wet lease agreement with SAS on an ad hoc basis for short-haul routes. One of the aircraft was painted in the SAS livery, but none received Viking names. Fred. Olsen sold the aircraft in 1962.	
Sud Aviation SE-210 Caravelle	Twinjet with rear engines	21	0	74–94	1959	1974	SAS was the launch customer of the Caravelle and became the model's second-largest operator. They were at first used on European routes but were gradually transferred to domestic services, especially in Sweden. SAS also bought four Caravelles that it leased to Swissair and from the mid-1960s, eight were leased to Thai Airways. One aircraft had a fatal crash at Ankara in 1960.	
Douglas DC-8-33	Four-engined jetliner	7	0	167	1960	1971	The choice of the DC-8 over the Boeing 707 was more based on SAS' good relations with Douglas rather than that it was well-suited for SAS' needs. The jet aircraft tripled the supply of seats on the transatlantic flights, which could not be met with increased traffic. From 1962 some of the aircraft were gradually transferred to Scanair.	
Convair 990 Coronado	Four-engined jetliner	2	0	99	1962	1966	Swissair and SAS signed a cooperation agreement in 1958, which involved SAS leasing two Coronados. The aircraft had low capacity and a high fuel consumption, although they featured the airline's highest cruise speed throughout history. They were used on the South American and some medium-haul European services. They were returned when the four-year lease ended.	
Douglas DC-8-55	Four-engined jetliner	3	0	142	1965	1971	The DC-8-33 had insufficient range for nonstop flights between Copenhagen and Los Angeles. As the model was optimized for medium-haul flights, SAS asked Douglas to build a variant better suited to their needs. Douglas at first claimed that needs were too demanding, but after SAS threatened to buy Boeings instead, Douglas was able to provide the -55, which had sufficient range. One aircraft was a freighter and the other two were taken over by Scanair.	
Douglas DC-9-32	Twinjet with rear engines	5	0	80–115	1967	1968	The DC-9 was the first jetliner ordered by the airline for short- and medium-haul flights, replacing the Metropolitans and Viscounts. Because SAS' custom-designed -40-series could not be delivered until 1968, SAS agreed to lease five of Swissair's aircraft as they were delivered, until SAS' own aircraft were delivered.	
British Aircraft Corporation One-Eleven 301AG	Twinjet with rear engines	2	0	79	1967	1968	One aircraft was leased for seven months from British Eagle, as SAS was expanding its network but had not received a sufficient number of DC-9s. It was mostly used on the Copenhagen–Zürich route and irregularly domestically in Denmark. SAS operated a second aircraft, without SAS livery, when the main aircraft was for maintenance in England.	
Douglas DC-8-62	Four-engined jetliner	10	0	156	1967	1987	The variant was the implementation of SAS' demand for a long-haul aircraft to operate the Los Angeles flights with full payload in all wind conditions. SAS was the launch customer of the tailor-made variant, although it would sell to many other airlines. It took over intercontinental services and allowed SAS to start a service via Tashkent to Bangkok. Some of the aircraft were later transferred to Scanair.	
Douglas DC-8-63	Four-engined jetliner	8	0	200	1968	1988	The aircraft were used on services to New York and Chicago. The last aircraft was the last production aircraft of the DC-8. Two of the aircraft were bought in 1973–74 from Eastern Air Lines, but the same year SAS started retiring the model, selling some to Thai International and others to Scanair.	
McDonnell Douglas DC-9-41	Twinjet with rear engines	49	0	99–122	1968	2002	The -40-series was built to the specifications of SAS, which saw a fuselage extension and increased range compared to the -30. SAS was the launch customer, although TOA Domestic was the only other customer. With deliveries continuing until 1977, the DC-9 replaced the Viscounts, Metropolitans and One-Elevens on domestic and European routes. One aircraft was written off after a non-fatal crash at Trondheim Airport, Værnes in 1987. They were equipped with hush kits in 1995.	
McDonnell Douglas DC-9-21	Twinjet with rear engines	10	0	75–85	1968	2000	The -21 was specifically designed for SAS' needs of short- and medium-haul jetliner with improved short field performance for use on short runways in Northern Norway and to a lesser extent Denmark and Sweden. SAS was the only customer of the variant. One aircraft was written off after a crash at Oslo Airport, Fornebu in 1973.	
McDonnell Douglas DC-9-33F	Twinjet with rear engines	2	0	0	1969	1988	With the increased intercontinental freight traffic generated by the DC-8, SAS also needed increased freight capacity between its hubs. The cargo aircraft were also used on European freight services.	
Boeing 747-283B	Large four-engine jetliner	3	0	353–396	1971	1987	SAS originally took delivery of two 747s and put them into service on the Copenhagen–New York service. The decision to purchase the aircraft was taken to keep up the airline's image, but it quickly became clear that there was not enough traffic from Scandinavia to fill the aircraft. A third aircraft was delivered in 1981, but during the 1980s, new management led by Jan Carlzon minimized the aircraft's use, and they were often leased out.	
Boeing 747-283B/SCD	Large four-engine jetliner	3	0	209–281	1977	1988	Increased freight traffic across the Atlantic and insufficient passenger traffic for a full 747 made SAS opt for the combi aircraft. They were put into a freight-centered route from Copenhagen via Gothenburg and Bergen to New York. A third aircraft, which happened to be the 500th 747 built, was delivered in 1981. One crashed while on lease to Avianca, while the other two were occasionally leased out to other carriers in short periods between 1983 and 1987 before being sold to Guinness Peat Aviation in 1988, who subsequently leased them to Philippine Airlines.	
McDonnell Douglas DC-10-30	Large trijet	12	0	266	1974	1991	SAS quickly realized that the 747s were too large for the traffic load. The -30 series of the DC-10 was developed after joint specifications from SAS and its partners KLM, Swissair and UTA, for a transatlantic variant that could reach the US West Coast. Originally five aircraft were delivered, one of which suffered a non-fatal accident at John F. Kennedy International Airport in February 1984 (Scandinavian Airlines System Flight 901), was repaired and brought back to service. SAS took delivery of the last seven as used aircraft in 1985–87, when the airline replaced the 747 and introduced increased frequency on the New York services. It was replaced by the Boeing 767-300ER.	
Airbus A300 B2-320	Large twinjet	4	0	242	1980	1984	The aircraft were ordered to operate on the busiest intra-Scandinavian and Western European routes. With Jan Carlzon's restructuring of SAS in 1980, the A300 was considered too large for SAS' needs and was grounded in 1983 (one was lost in a landing accident while on lease to Malaysia Airlines). They had been ordered in a unique hybrid configuration, making them impossible to sell on the second-hand market. They were therefore transferred to Scanair but had to be rebuilt to the B4 variant to have sufficient range for charter flights.	
Boeing 747-100	—	2	0	396	1982	1983	SAS leased two secondhand aircraft for use for Hajj pilgrimage flight charters, the first being an ex-Alitalia airframe leased from June 1982 through December 1983, while the second was an ex-Continental used from August to November 1983. The former aircraft was also used by Scanair.	
Douglas DC-9-51	Twinjet with rear engines	4	0	137	1983	1990	Insufficient number of aircraft during the 1980s caused SAS to lease 4 DC-9-51 for two periods. The first lease was one aircraft for eight months in 1983–84 from Inex Adria, used on the routes from Stockholm to Gothenburg and Luleå. The second was three aircraft from Swissair leased between 1987 and 1990.	
Fokker F27 Friendship	Twin turboprop with high wings	9	0	40	1984	1990	The aircraft were bought to establish the Commuter Operations Department, later SAS Commuter. Four were bought used from Trans Australia Airlines and five from Aero Trasporti Italiani. One aircraft was of the -200 series, the rest -600, all -600 having a cargo door. The aircraft were used on the Eurolink network—short-haul routes from Copenhagen. The old aeroplanes, built between 1967 and 1969, were unpopular with customers because of low comfort, high noise levels, and many technical problems.	
McDonnell Douglas MD-81	Twinjet with rear engines	42	0	130	1985	2010	SAS did not need additional aircraft at the launch of the MD-80-series, and waited until 1984 to order its first six aircraft, with the last of 33 aircraft delivered in 1992. SAS chose a non-electronic flight instrument system cockpit to ensure commonality with the DC-9s. The aircraft were used on European routes. 17 aircraft would later be converted to MD-82. 9 more aircraft were leased used from Swissair between 1995 and 2000. One aircraft was written off in Flight 751.	
McDonnell Douglas MD-82	Twinjet with rear engines	31	0	150	1985	2013	The MD-82 had a higher payload, allowing it to be configured in a single class for domestic traffic in Sweden and Norway, where increased traffic made the DC-9 too small. 14 MD-82s were bought as such, but SAS later converted 17 MD-81s. The aircraft were well-suited for charter and were periodically leased to Scanair and Spanair.	
McDonnell Douglas MD-83	Twinjet with rear engines	2	0	141	1988	2005	The long-range variants of the MD-80 were bought for flights to the Middle East and Greenland. They were periodically leased to Scanair.	
McDonnell Douglas MD-87	Twinjet with rear engines	18	0	125	1988	2012	SAS took delivery sixteen aircraft between 1988 and 1992, which were largely used on European services with lower patronage. Unlike the other MD-80s, the MD-87 had electronic flight instrument system. One aircraft was written off in the fatal 2001 Linate Airport runway collision.	
Fokker 50	Twin turboprop with high wings	22	0	46–50	1990	2010	The establishment of SAS Commuter in 1989 required new and more aircraft, which would replace the F27. Seventeen aircraft were branded Eurolink, given 46 seats and based in Copenhagen and Stockholm; Norlink had five 50-passenger aircraft which flew in Northern Norway. The Eurolink and later Swelink aircraft were replaced by the Dash 8 from 1999, while the F50 remained in service in Norway, serving Western Norway until 2010.	
Boeing 767-383ER	Large twinjet	16	0	251	1989	2004	Ordered in 1988, the 767-300ER was selected because of its quick delivery time, following a policy change to make airline's intercontinental routes more flexible. It was first introduced on the smaller long-haul routes, but in 1991 the 767 had replaced the DC-10 entirely. However, the aircraft had a low payload which repeatedly caused SAS to have to operate non-full aircraft on the Singapore route. Two of the aircraft were bought used to replace the -200.	
Boeing 767-283ER	Large twinjet	2	0	198	1990	1993	SAS received two 767s with shorter fuselages, but these aircraft were retired in 1992 and 1993, respectively, and replaced with two additional -300ERs. Subsequently, both aircraft were operated by Transbrasil, and later by Aeroméxico.	
Fokker F28-1067	Twinjet with rear engines	3	0	65	1993	1997	The aircraft were bought used by Linjeflyg in 1973 and entered service with SAS when it took over Linjeflyg in 1993. With SAS the aircraft were used domestically in Sweden, largely flying the former Linjeflyg services.	
Fokker F28-4107	Twinjet with rear engines	17	0	75–85	1993	1999	The Mk 4000 was largely built after Linjeflyg's specifications, with the airline becoming the launch customer in 1976. The aircraft were transferred to SAS with the 1993 takeover, where they continued to fly on the Swedish domestic network, largely on ex-Linjeflyg routes. Some were converted to a 75-seat European version and used on services such as Gothenburg–Paris and Eurolink services out of Copenhagen.	
Boeing 737-500	Medium twinjet	25	0	120–133	1993	2013	The first batch of aircraft were 11 inherited from Linjeflyg. They operated on the Swedish domestic network, but SAS immediately started retiring them. The second batch was ex-Braathens aircraft taken over by SAS Braathens in 2004 being used until 2013. The batch consisted of the 14 remaining of 17 aircraft delivered between 1990 and 1994.	
McDonnell Douglas MD-90-30	Twinjet with rear engines	8	0	141	1996	2008	The original order of six aircraft was the first time SAS based an entire order on leasing. The aircraft were used on busy European routes, such as between the Scandinavian capitals and to Frankfurt, Paris and London, as well as Stockholm–Gothenburg. They were moved to domestic traffic in Sweden with the introduction of the Airbus A321.	
Saab 2000	Twin turboprop with low wings	7	0	49	1997	2016	The aircraft were used by SAS Commuter's Swelink services out of Stockholm to Kalmar, Ronneby, Växjö, Kristianstad, Karlstad and Skellefteå in Sweden, and Tampere, Turku and Vaasa in Finland. In 2001 all were transferred to Air Botnia and replaced with the Dash 8. From May 2014 to March 2016 SAS operated 1 Saab 2000 leased from Braathens Regional.	
Boeing 737-600	Medium twinjet	30	0	120-123	1998	2019	SAS was the launch customer of the -600 series, which replaced the DC-9 and F28 aircraft. The series is used both on domestic and European routes.	
Boeing 737-700	Medium twinjet	32	1	141	1999	2023	The first six aircraft were bought to replace DC-9 and some MD-80 aircraft on domestic services and were later supplemented with four more. SAS Braathens inherited an additional nine aircraft from Braathens in the 2004 merger. One 737-700 remains in service and is equipped for medical evacuation.	
Boeing 737-800	Medium twinjet	35	0	181	2000	2023	The aircraft were ordered as converted options for smaller 737s. They were given a single-class domestic seat configuration and are used on the busiest domestic services as well as on charter flights.	
Bombardier Dash-8-Q400	Twin turboprop with high wings	28	0	72–76	2000	2007	The aircraft were bought to replace the Saab 2000 and Fokker 50 in Sweden and Denmark. They were plagued with problems; there was a halt in delivery after 11 units to modify the design of the remaining order. The aircraft were retired after the Dash 8 landing gear incidents.	
Airbus A321-200	Medium twinjet	8	0	198	2001	2023	The aircraft were delivered to allow higher passenger numbers on the busiest European routes, such as to London, Frankfurt, Amsterdam and Paris, as well as busy intra-Scandinavian routes.	
Airbus A320-200	Medium twinjet	13	11	168	2012	present	The aircraft are all taken up second hand by SAS and primarily utilized out of Copenhagen on intra-Scandinavian and European routes.	
Airbus A340-313X	Large jetliner with four engines	8	0	245	2001	2020	SAS began planning a reorganization of its intercontinental traffic in 1996, driven by the 767s having a low passenger capacity and their inability to haul a full load on the longest routes. The order was placed along with the A330 in an attempt to increase intercontinental traffic by 50 percent.	
Airbus A330-200	Large twinjet	1	0	218	2001	2001	One aircraft was short-time leased from British Midland International to gain experience operating the Airbus A330 aircraft. It only operated for three months as it was grounded after the September 11 attacks and subsequent closure of American air space, cancelling international services. The aircraft had a Star Alliance livery.	
Airbus A330-300	Large twinjet	9	8	266	2002	present	Four aircraft were bought in 2002 along with the A340 to replace the 767 on shorter intercontinental routes, allowing for 25 per cent lower operating costs per seat kilometre. Four more were added in 2015–2016.	
Boeing 737-400	Medium twinjet	4	0	150	2004	2013	Braathens originally took delivery of seven aircraft between 1989 and 1994. Four aircraft were taken over in the SAS Braathens merger of 2004 and phased out in 2013.	
Airbus A319-100		4	4	141	2006	present	The aircraft are operated out of Copenhagen on longer European routes, such as to Greenland and Tel Aviv.	
British Aerospace Avro RJ70	Small four-engined jetliner with high wings	1	0	70	2006	2006	The aircraft was operated by Transwede Airways on the route from Stockholm to London City Airport.	
British Aerospace 146–300	Small four-engined jetliner with high wings	1	0	100	2008	2009	Operated by WDL Aviation, the aircraft was used on routes to London City Airport.	>
British Aerospace 146–200	Small four-engined jetliner with high wings	1	0	96	2008	2010	Operated by WDL Aviation, the aircraft was used on routes to London City Airport.	
Bombardier CRJ900	Small twinjet with rear eingines	36	28	88-90	2008	present	12 aircraft were delivered in 2008 and 2009 as replacements for the Dash 8, being used on short-haul European and intra-Scandinavian services. 22 more CRJ900s have been delivered in 2016–2018. Of the original 12, 6 are still in the fleet. The aircraft are operated by CityJet and Nordica.	
ATR 72-600	Small twin turboprop with high wings	21	10	70	2013	present	Operated by Nordica. The turboprops are used on regional routes out of Copenhagen and Stockholm.	
Boeing BBJ1	—	1	0	86	2013	2017	The PrivatAir-operated long-range variant of the Boeing 737 was used for the intercontinental "oil route" between Stavanger and Houston, featuring an all-business layout. Reconfigured in the autumn of 2015 to 20 business, 66 economy seats and used on the Copenhagen – Boston route.	
Airbus A320neo		41	41	180	2016	present	SAS initially placed a firm order for 30 aircraft, later ordering 50 more on 10 April 2018. The first delivery took place on 21 October 2016. The frames are being based primarily in Stockholm replacing all Boeing 737 and older A320.	
Airbus A350-900 XWB		6	6	300	2019	present	SAS has placed a firm order for 8 aircraft, with an option for additional six units. They are planned to be used on the intercontinental services.	
Embraer E195		15	15	122	2022	-	SAS Link operated Embraer E195 on regional routes since 2022.	
