= List of Scandinavian Airlines accidents and incidents =

Accidents and incidents involving Scandinavian Airlines

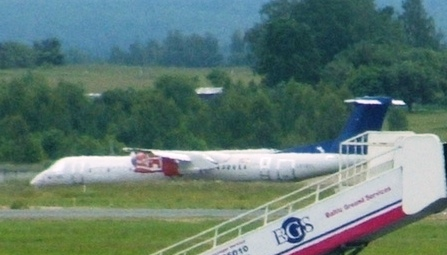
A Bombardier Dash 8 Q400 at Vilnius Airport after having carried out a landing with a landing gear defect. This was the second of three Dash 8 landing gear incidents.

Scandinavian Airlines System (SAS), commonly known as Scandinavian Airlines, is the national airline of Denmark, Norway, and Sweden. Owned by the eponymous SAS Group, it operates out of three main hubs, Copenhagen Airport, Stockholm-Arlanda Airport, and Oslo Airport, Gardermoen. It transported 22.9 million passengers to 90 destinations on an average 683 flights daily in 2011.

Of the airline's twenty-three major accidents and incidents, four have resulted in the loss of life. The first was the 1948 Northwood mid-air collision over London, with which 39 fatalities made it the deadliest accident in the United Kingdom at the time. In the 1960 Flight 871 to Istanbul, the aircraft descended too early, resulting in 42 people perishing in the first accident of the Sud Aviation Caravelle. The same cause was responsible nine years later in Los Angeles, when 15 people were killed in Flight 933. The final and most deadly accident was Flight 686, where 114 people were killed in a runway collision in Milan in 2001.

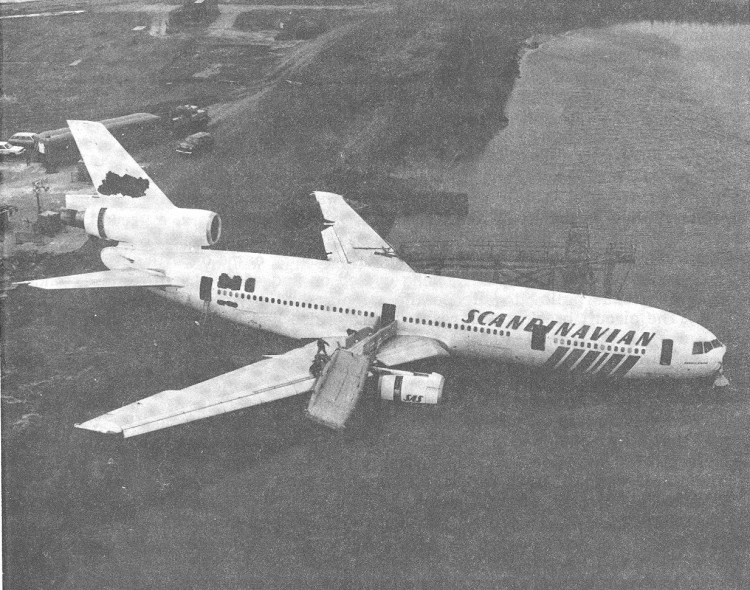
Flight 901 after a runway overrun on 28 February 1984, with passengers evacuating

SAS has been subject to three hijackings—none of which have resulted in the loss of lives. Two were successful: Flight 130 in 1972 was captured by the Croatian National Resistance, while Flight 347 in 1994 was captured in the ruse of the Bosnian War. Two accidents have been dramatized as part of the television series Mayday. In addition to Flight 686, it featured Flight 751, which crashed without fatalities in a forest in Gottröra after foreign object damage. Fifteen accidents have resulted in aircraft being written off. This includes two of the Dash 8 landing gear incidents in September 2007, which resulted in a group-wide retirement of the Bombardier Dash 8-Q400.

== List ==
The following is a list of all major accidents involving Scandinavian Airlines. It includes all fatal accidents, all write-offs, all hijackings, and other major incidents. SAS registers its aircraft in one of the three Scandinavian countries. Aircraft with registration starting with LN are registered in Norway, SE in Sweden, and OY in Denmark. Unless otherwise noted, all accidents and incidents had no fatalities and ended with the aircraft being written off. All times are local.

Date	Location	Type	Aircraft	Description
4 July 1948 15:03	Northwood, near RAF Northolt, London, United Kingdom 51.60°N 0.453°W	Mid-air collision	Douglas DC-6 (SE-BDA)	After an hour of circling over Northolt, the SAS aircraft announced its departure from the stack. Upon gaining height, it collided with an Avro York of the Royal Air Force. In what was at the time the United Kingdom's most severe aviation accident as all 39 people on board both aircraft were killed. Contributory causes were issues with the York setting the correct atmospheric pressure and correct communication. The incident contributed to an increase in the vertical separation of aircraft.
22 January 1949	(Sweden) Luleå Airport, Luleå, Sweden 65°32′37″N 022°07′19″E	Fire	Douglas C-47 (SE-BBN)	The aircraft was destroyed in a fire.
1 April 1951	(Sweden) Stockholm-Bromma Airport, Stockholm, Sweden 59°21′16″N 17°56′23″E	Engine failure	Douglas C-47 (SE-BBM)	Upon having one of the engines catch on fire, the pilot chose to land the aircraft on a road near the airport. All 22 people on board the Copenhagen to Stockholm flight were evacuated before the aircraft was consumed in the ensuing fire.
22 November 1957	(Sweden) Norrköping Airport, Norrköping, Sweden 58°35′10″N 016°13′54″E	Belly landing	Douglas DC-6B (SE-BDP)	During a training flight the aircraft was subject to a belly landing. All five people on board were evacuated before the aircraft was consumed in the ensuing fire.
19 January 1960 18:47	Near Esenboğa International Airport, Ankara, Turkey	Controlled flight into terrain	Sud Aviation Caravelle (OY-KRB)	During approach the pilots descended unintentionally below authorized minimum flight altitude, for reasons which have not been established. The Caravelle crashed 10 km (6 mi) from the runway. All 42 people on board were killed in the impact in what was the first accident of a Caravelle.
8 February 1965	(Spain) Tenerife North Airport, La Laguna, Spain 28°28′58″N 016°20′30″W	Pilot error	Douglas DC-7C (SE-CCC)	During take-off to Copenhagen the landing gear was retracted prematurely. This caused the aircraft to sink down on the runway and catch fire.
13 January 1969 19:21	(United States) Santa Monica Bay near Los Angeles International Airport, Los Angeles, United States 33°55′14″N 118°31′58″W	Controlled flight into terrain	Douglas DC-8-62 (LN-MOO)	During approach the nose gear indicator lights failed to turn on, due to a burnt-out light bulb. The pilots became preoccupied with fixing the nose gear issue that they lost their situation awareness, failing to keep track of the aircraft's altitude. The aircraft crashed into water 6 NM (11 km; 7 mi) from the runway, killing 15 of 45 people on board.
19 April 1970	(Italy) Leonardo da Vinci–Fiumicino Airport, Fiumicino, Italy 41°48′01″N 012°14′20″E	Engine failure	Douglas DC-8-62 (SE-DBE)	50 m (160 ft) into the take-off roll the first stage fan disk the no. one engine failed, causing a leak in the number two fuel tank. Meanwhile, debris ricocheted off the runway and compromised the center fuel tank. The fuel then caught fire.
17 May 1971	(Sweden) Bulltofta Airport, Malmö, Sweden 55°36′18″N 013°03′35″E	Hijacking	McDonnell Douglas DC-9	A 21-year-old American deserter took his girlfriend hostage and threatened his way through the airport to the aircraft. Once aboard, he demanded that the aircraft fly to Stockholm, where it was scheduled to fly. The 24 passengers were evacuated without difficulties. The police considered shooting him, but instead one of his friends was able to talk him out of the situation. The hijacker suffered from paranoia after he was assaulted by fellow soldiers while serving in Germany.
15 September 1972	(Sweden) Bulltofta Airport, Malmö, Sweden 55°36′18″N 013°03′35″E	Hijacking	McDonnell Douglas DC-9-21 (LN-RLO)	Three members of the Croatian National Resistance took control of the domestic flight from Torslanda Airport, Gothenburg, and redirected it to Bulltofta. They demanded the release of seven fellow Croatian separatist prisoners who had attacked two Yugoslavian diplomatic missions the year before. Six of these were exchanged for the release of 86 passengers, a full tank and half a million Swedish krona. The aircraft then flew to Madrid–Barajas Airport, where the hijackers surrendered—after 23 hours. They and the prisoners were never returned to Sweden.
30 January 1973 23:19	(Norway) Oslo Airport, Fornebu, Bærum Municipality, Norway 59°53′N 010°37′E	Runway overrun	McDonnell Douglas DC-9-21 (LN-RLM)	The Tromsø and Alta-headed flight stalled after rotating at 125 kn (232 km/h; 144 mph). The captain aborted the take-off with a speed of 140 kn (260 km/h; 160 mph), but the remaining 1,100 m (3,600 ft) was not sufficient to brake the aircraft with the reversers not operating correctly. The aircraft overran the runway and came to rest on the ice-covered Oslofjord, 20 m (66 ft) from the bank. All occupants were evacuated, and the aircraft broke through the ice and sank 20 minutes later.
25 January 1974	(Sweden) Stockholm Arlanda Airport, Sigtuna, Sweden 59°39′07″N 017°55′07″E	Ground collision	Sud Aviation SE-210 Caravelle III (OY-KRA)	The aircraft collided with a service truck and sustained damages beyond repair.
1 January 1976	(Denmark) Copenhagen Airport, Kastrup, Denmark 55°37′05″N 012°39′22″E	Foreign object damage	McDonnell Douglas DC-10-30 (LN-RKA)	After take-off from runway 22L the number one engine failed following ingestion of black-headed gulls. The aircraft turned around and carried out an emergency landing. The aircraft was repaired after the incident.
28 February 1984 16:16	(United States) John F. Kennedy International Airport, New York City, United States 40°38′23″N 073°46′44″W	Runway overrun	McDonnell Douglas DC-10-30 (LN-RKB)	Upon landing, the DC-10 overshot and overran runway 04R by 1,440 m (4,720 ft). The pilots steered the aircraft starboard to avoid hitting approach lights and came to a rest in shallow water. The cause was the crew's failure to follow the proper procedures for monitoring and controlling airspeed, overreliance on the autothrottle, malfunction of the autothrottle's control system, and failure to carry out a missed approach. Although substantially damaged, the aircraft was repaired and returned to service.
27 February 1987	(Norway) Trondheim Airport, Værnes, Stjørdal Municipality, Norway 63°27′27″N 010°55′27″E	Hard landing	McDonnell Douglas DC-9-41 (SE-DAT)	During approach to Værnes the air traffic control asked the pilots to contact the SAS station on company frequency. Despite the violation of regulation the captain interrupted his checklist to contact the airline dispatcher. When completed, he skipped a point in the checklist and did not arm the spoilers. The first officer noticed this just before touch-down, shouting out "Spoilers." The captain extended the spoilers, realized his mistake, and retracted them, but the aircraft underwent a high sink rate and had a heavy touchdown. A go-around was executed, and after landing severe structural damage was found to the undercarriage, engines, and tail cone. There were no fatalities, but the aircraft was written off.
27 December 1991 08:51	(Sweden) Gottröra near Stockholm Arlanda Airport, Sweden 59°46′06″N 018°07′55″E	Foreign object damage	McDonnell Douglas MD-81 (OY-KHO)	Ice had collected on the wings' inner roots prior to take off. It broke off and was sucked into the engines as the aircraft became airborne on takeoff. After both engines failed within two minutes of takeoff, the pilots were forced to make an emergency landing in a field. One hundred people were injured, but there were no fatalities. The accident was caused by SAS' instructions and routines being inadequate to ensure that clear ice was removed from the wings of the aircraft prior to takeoff.
24 November 1993 17:52	(Denmark) Copenhagen Airport, Kastrup, Denmark 55°37′05″N 012°39′22″E	Technical fault	McDonnell Douglas MD-87 (SE-DIB)	During taxiing before take-off, in which the cabin crew detected electrical smoke. The fire occurred in electrical wires which fed power to a utility plug and lighting in a stowage closet. This was again caused by a slack in the wiring. Flight 666 returned to gate where it was evacuated. A fire subsequently broke out and destroyed the aft interior and part of the fuselage. The aircraft was repaired.
3 November 1994	(Norway) Oslo Airport, Gardermoen, Ullensaker Municipality, Norway 60°12′10″N 011°05′02″E	Hijacking	McDonnell Douglas MD-82	The flight from Bardufoss Airport was hijacked mid-air by a Bosnian living in Norway. All women, children and seniors of the 122 passengers were let off on the scheduled stopover at Bodø Airport. The hijacker demanded that Norwegian authorities help to stop the humanitarian suffering in his country caused by the Bosnian War. Some of his demands were met and he subsequently surrendered after seven hours.
8 October 2001 08:10	(Italy) Linate Airport, Milan, Italy 57°05′34″N 009°50′57″E	Runway collision	McDonnell Douglas MD-87 (SE-DMA)	SAS Flight 686, a McDonnell Douglas MD-87, carrying 110 people collided on take-off with a Cessna Citation CJ2 business jet carrying four people. All 114 people on board the two aircraft were killed, as were four on the ground. A further four people on the ground were injured. Although the immediate cause was the incursion of the Cessna on to the active runway, the underlying cause was a series of deficiencies in the airport layout and procedures, including lack of ground radar and guidance signs.
9 September 2007 15:57	(Denmark) Aalborg Airport, Aalborg, Denmark 55°37′05″N 012°39′22″E	Technical fault	Bombardier Dash 8-Q400 (LN-RDK)	Prior to landing, the right main landing gear failed to lock and the crew circled for an hour before attempting a prepared emergency landing. Upon touchdown, the right landing gear collapsed, the right wing touched ground and a fire broke out. The fire went out before the aircraft came to rest and all passengers and crew were evacuated. Five people suffered minor injuries, some from propeller parts entering the cabin and others from the evacuation.
12 September 2007 01:36	(Lithuania) Vilnius Airport, Vilnius, Lithuania 54°38′13″N 025°17′16″E	Technical fault	Bombardier Dash 8-Q400 (LN-RDS)	The flight was headed to Palanga, but was diverted to Vilnius Airport when landing gear problems were discovered before landing. Upon touchdown, the right landing gear collapsed. All passengers and crew were evacuated safely. SAS grounded their entire Q400 fleet consisting of 27 aircraft, and a few hours later the manufacturer Bombardier Aerospace recommended that all the Q400 aircraft with more than 10,000 flights stay grounded until further notice.
27 October 2007 16:53	(Denmark) Copenhagen Airport, Kastrup, Denmark 55°37′05″N 012°39′22″E	Technical fault	Bombardier Dash 8-Q400 (LN-RDI)	Upon discovering problems with the main landing gear, two hours were spent in the air to burn fuel and troubleshoot. The pilots carried out an emergency landing with the right main landing gear up. The right engine was shut off for the landing, because in the previous landings the propeller had hit the ground and shards of it ripped into the fuselage. This was not on the emergency checklist, rather it was the pilots making a safety-based decision. The following day SAS announced a group-wide permanent and immediate retirement of the Q400.
1 May 2013 19:24	(United States) Newark Liberty International Airport, Newark, United States 40°41′33″N 074°10′07″W	Ground collision	Airbus A330-300 (LN-RKO)	SAS Flight 908 to Oslo was on the taxiway queueing for take-off behind an Embraer ERJ 145 of ExpressJet. After orders from air traffic control, upon turning right the Airbus's left wing hit the horizontal and vertical stabilizers of the Embraer. The Airbus suffered minor damage, while the Embraer was severely damaged, but repaired.
25 October 2017 17:25	Turku Airport, Turku, Finland	Runway overrun	Bombardier CRJ-900 (EI-FPD)	Flight SK4236 from Stockholm to Turku overran runway 26 upon arrival. It had been snowing in Finland Proper earlier that day. There were no fatalities. As of 11/2017, the incident is under investigation by the Finnish Safety Investigation Authority.
28 September 2018 04:22	Luleå Airport, Luleå, Sweden	Engine fire	Boeing 737-600 (LN-RRP)	Flight 1049 was departing from Kiruna airport and was passing through 32,000 feet when the left engine caught fire. The flight diverted to Luleå. No injuries were reported.
14 February 2024 10:00	Oslo Airport, Gardermoen, Ullensaker Municipality, Norway	Ground collision	Airbus A320	The left wing of SAS Flight 864 hit a fence on pushback from the gate due to slippery conditions at Oslo Airport. The flight was disembarked safely. No injuries were reported.
5 February 2026 22:04	Brussels Airport, Brussels, Belgium	Pilot error	Airbus A320 (SE-ROM)	The flight SK2590 from Brussels to Copenhagen got lost in darkness at Brussels airport, and started take-off on a taxiway. The takeoff was interrupted at a speed of 117 knots, and the aircraft managed to halt outside paved areas near a fuel storage. No injuries reported.
