= 2001 in aviation =

This is a list of aviation-related events from 2001.

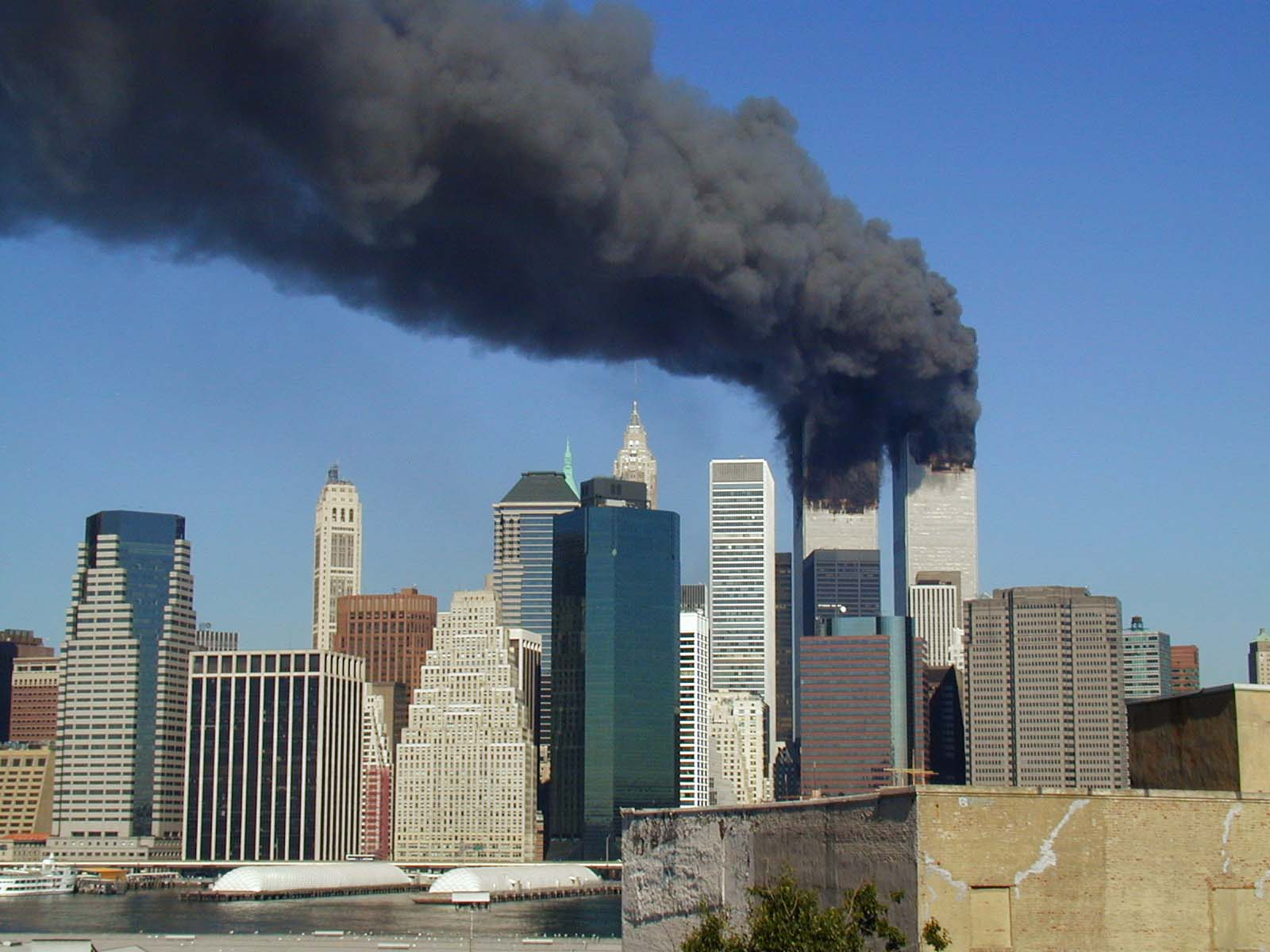
2001 in aviation was marked by the September 11 attacks, which had a widespread impact on the entire aviation industry.

== Events ==
=== January ===
- January 10 – Trans World Airlines (TWA) and American Airlines announce that they have agreed to merge, with American acquiring almost all the assets of TWA, consisting at the time of 190 aircraft, about 800 daily flights, 20,000 employees, numerous routes and gates, and substantial maintenance facilities. Under the agreement, American is to employ almost all of TWA's employees and maintain St. Louis, Missouri as a major air hub. The merger will be completed in December.
- January 23 – Yemenia Flight 448, a Boeing 727-2N8 with 100 other people on board and flying from Sanaa International Airport in Sanaa, Yemen, to Taiz International Airport in Taiz, Yemen, is hijacked by an unemployed Iraqi man using a pen gun. He attempts to reroute the flight to Baghdad, Iraq, where he hopes to find work. The flight crew makes an emergency landing at Djibouti–Ambouli International Airport in Djibouti and overpowers the hijacker. The only injury is to the flight engineer, who is grazed by a bullet.
- January 27 – A Beechcraft Super King Air 200, the team plane of the Oklahoma State University men's basketball team crashes near Strasburg, Colorado, during a snowstorm, killing all 10 people on board. Killed are two players, seven members of the media, and the pilot.
- January 31 – Two Japan Air Lines airliners – a Boeing 747-446 operating as Flight 907 and a Douglas DC-10-40D operating as Flight 958 – nearly collide over Suruga Bay, Japan, passing within 100 meters (330 feet) of one another. Aboard the 747, a hundred people are injured when the aircraft takes violent evasive action. Had the two planes collided, with a combined 677 people on board, it would have been the worst aviation disaster in history.

=== February ===
- February 1 – Aer Lingus Commuter, a subsidiary of Aer Lingus founded in 1984, merges into Aer Lingus.
- February 14 – Air Somalia is founded.
- February 16 – American and British aircraft launch attacks against six targets in southern Iraq, including command centers, radars, and communications centers, hitting only about 40% of the targets. Incidents of planes enforcing the no-fly zone over southern Iraq in Operation Southern Watch thereafter exchange fire with Iraqi air defense sites on a weekly basis.

=== March ===
- March 1 – Continental Airlines commences non-stop service from Newark International Airport in New Jersey to Hong Kong.
- March 3 – An explosion in the center wing fuel tank destroys Thai Airways International Flight 114, a Boeing 737-4D7, on the ground while it is preboarding at Don Mueang Airport in Bangkok, Thailand. One person, a flight attendant, is killed.
- March 15/16 – Russian Vnukovo Airlines Flight 2806 is hijacked by 3 Chechens and flown to Prince Mohammad bin Abdulaziz International Airport in Medina. There, after negotiations fail, Saudi special forces storm the aircraft, inadvertently killing a flight attendant and another passenger. One hijacker is dead and the other two are arrested.
- March 21 – During a single flight, an RQ-4 Global Hawk unmanned surveillance aircraft flying from Edwards Air Force Base in California sets both a world endurance record for unmanned aerial vehicles (UAVs) of 30 hours, 24 minutes, 1 second, and a world absolute altitude record for UAVs of 19,928 meters (65,381 feet).
- March 25 – Czech Airlines joins the Skyteam airline alliance.
- March 29 – An Avjet charter flight, a Gulfstream III jet with 15 passengers and three crew members, crashes on approach into Aspen, Colorado, killing all on board.

=== April ===
- Afriqiyah Airways is founded. It will begin flight operations in December.
- Czech Airlines Cargo joins the Skyteam Cargo airline alliance.
- April 1 – Two Chinese People's Liberation Army Navy Shenyang J8II fighters intercept a United States Navy EP-3E ARIES II signals intelligence aircraft over the South China Sea, and one of the Chinese pilots dies when his fighter collides with the EP-3E and breaks up. The damaged EP-3E makes an emergency landing without permission at Lingshui airfield on China's Hainan Island, where the Chinese take its 24-person crew prisoner. The Chinese will release the EP-3E crew on April 11, and will return the EP-3E itself to the United States in a disassembled state on July 3.
- April 20 – A Cessna A185E floatplane is mistakenly shot down by a Cessna A-37 Dragonfly of the Peruvian Air Force, killing two civilians and injuring the pilot. The American Central Intelligence Agency, which had monitored the aircraft with a spotter plane in an advisory role, temporarily suspends its Air Bridge Denial Program in response.
- April 24 – An unmanned RQ-4 Global Hawk surveillance aircraft flies automatically from Edwards Air Force Base, California, in the United States to Royal Australian Air Force Base Edinburgh in Edinburgh, Australia, non-stop and unrefuelled, becoming the first pilotless aircraft to cross the Pacific Ocean. At 13,219.86 km (8,214.44 mi), it is the longest point-to-point flight ever undertaken by an unmanned aircraft, and takes 23 hours and 23 minutes.

=== May ===
- The Republic of China places the Aviation Safety Council, formerly an independent government agency responsible for aviation accident investigation with the purpose of analyzing causal factors and proposing flight safety recommendations in Taiwan, under the control of the Executive Yuan.
- Air Somalia is banned from flying to Somaliland.
- Uganda Airlines ceases operations, and Uganda Airlines Corporation is liquidated.
- May 15 – The launch customer for the Boeing 737-900, Alaska Airlines, takes delivery of the first of the aircraft it ordered.
- May 18 – Belavia commences service between Minsk, Belarus and Paris, France with Tupolev Tu-134s and Tupolev Tu-154s on the route.

=== June ===
- June 12 – Jetsgo, a Canadian airline, commences operations.

=== July ===
- July 1
  - Singapore Airlines Cargo, operated by Singapore Airlines, begins operations.
  - Regional Air joins the Oneworld airline alliance.
- July 4 – Vladivostok Air Flight 352, a Tupolev-154, crashes during its approach to Irkutsk Airport, Russia, killing all 145 people on board.
- July 27 – Alitalia joins the Skyteam airline alliance.

=== August ===
- Alitalia Cargo joins the Skyteam Cargo airline alliance.
- August 4 – American Trans Air becomes the North American launch customer for the Boeing 757-300.
- August 13 – On a single flight, the NASA Helios Prototype sets the absolute world record for altitude by an unmanned aerial vehicle (UAV) and the world record for altitude for sustained flight by a winged aircraft, reaching 29,524 meters (96,864 feet). It spends 40 minutes flying above 96,000 feet (29,000 meters).
- August 24 – Air Transat Flight 236, an Airbus A330-243 flying from Toronto, Ontario, Canada, to Lisbon, Portugal, with 306 people on board, runs out of fuel over the Atlantic Ocean due to a fuel leak in the No. 2 engine. The aircraft performs the world's longest recorded glide by a jet airliner, covering 65 nautical miles (75 statute miles; 120 km) without power to an emergency landing at Lajes Air Base in the Azores. Eighteen people are injured – two seriously – while evacuating the aircraft, but there are no fatalities.
- August 25 – An overloaded Cessna 402B, registration number N8097W, crashes immediately after takeoff from Marsh Harbour Airport in the Abaco Islands in The Bahamas, killing all nine people on board, including the American recording artist, dancer, actress, and model Aaliyah.

=== September ===
- September 8 – Patrick Critton, wanted for hijacking Air Canada Flight 932 over Canada on December 26, 1971 and forcing it to fly to Havana, Cuba, is arrested for the crime at his home in Mount Vernon, New York. He is extradited to Canada to face charges.
- September 11 – Al-Qaeda members hijack four airliners, two of American Airlines and two of United Airlines, and crash them into the World Trade Center in New York City, the Pentagon in Arlington, Virginia, and a field in Pennsylvania in the September 11 attacks, killing 2,996 people. The four flights are American Airlines Flight 11, a Boeing 767-223ER with five hijackers and 87 other people on board which hits the North Tower of the World Trade Center; United Airlines Flight 175, a Boeing 767-222 with five hijackers and 60 other people on board which almost collides in mid-air with Delta Air Lines Flight 2315 and hits the South Tower of the World Trade Center; American Airlines Flight 77, a Boeing 757-223 with five hijackers and 59 other people on board which hits the Pentagon; and United Airlines Flight 93, a Boeing 757-222 with four hijackers and 40 other people on board which was to hit the United States Capitol or White House, but is taken over by the passengers and crashes in a rural area in Stonycreek Township, near Shanksville, Pennsylvania. In addition to the death of all 19 hijackers and all 246 other people aboard the planes, about 2,500 people in the World Trade Center and 125 people in the Pentagon die. Among the dead are American television producer David Angell, American photographer, actress, and model Berry Berenson, American filmmaker Carolyn Beug and American astronaut Charles Edward Jones aboard American Flight 11; Canadian professional ice hockey player Garnet "Ace" Bailey and American ice hockey player Mark Bavis aboard United Flight 175; American lawyer and television commentator Barbara Olson and American gymnastics coach Mari-Rae Sopper and former United States Navy Wilson Flagg aboard American Flight 77; and United States Army Lieutenant General Timothy Maude, the highest-ranking military officer killed during the day, in the Pentagon. With a combined total of 2,996 killed (including people on both the aircraft and the ground), the four crashes remain the deadliest air disaster in history. The attacks cause massive financial damage and trigger an economic depression in the aviation industry.
- September 12 – Ansett Australia leaves the Star Alliance due to bankruptcy.
- September 14
  - In the aftermath of the terrorist attacks of 11 September, the United States and Canada begin Operation Noble Eagle, a permanent operation to provide for the air defense of cities in the two countries. The United States Air Force provides F-15 Eagle and F-16 Fighting Falcon fighters for the operation, while Canadian Armed Forces Air Command provides CF-18 Hornet fighters and the United States Army National Guard contributes short-range ground-based air defense systems.
  - Ansett Australia ceases flight operations due to financial collapse.
- September 15 – TAM Airlines Flight 9755, a Fokker 100, suffers an engine failure over Belo Horizonte, fragments of the turbine blades break 3 windows and the passenger in Seat 19E is partially sucked out of the plane, the passenger does not survive, the plane makes an emergency landing Confins International Airport
- September 24 – US Airways decides to terminate all MetroJet flights.
- September 28 – The Government of Venezuela establishes the National Institute of Civil Aviation as Venezuela's national civil aviation authority.

=== October ===
- October 1
  - After receiving a guarantee from the Government of Australia, Ansett Australia resumes limited service between major cities using only its Airbus A320s.
  - Japan creates its Aircraft and Railway Accidents Investigation Commission; it replaces the Aircraft Accident Investigation Commission.
- October 2 – A major cash-flow crisis prompts Swissair to ground all of its aircraft.
- October 4 – Siberia Airlines Flight 1812, a Tupolev Tu-154, is suspected to have been shot down and crashes into the Black Sea. All 78 people on board die.
- October 5 – A Swiss government emergency loan allows Swissair to resume some flights.
- October 7 – The War in Afghanistan begins with strikes by American military aircraft against targets in Kabul, Kandahar, and Jalalabad as, in response to the al-Qaeda attacks of September 11, the United States launches Operation Enduring Freedom with a goal of dismantling al-Qaeda and ending its use of Afghanistan as a base by deposing the Taliban regime there.
- October 8 – Scandinavian Airlines Flight 686, a McDonnell Douglas MD87, collides with a Cessna Citation CJ2 business jet while taking off on a fog-shrouded runway from Linate Airport in Milan, Italy, for a flight to Copenhagen, Denmark; the airliner then crashes into a nearby hangar and catches fire. All six crew members and 104 passengers on the airliner are killed, as are the four occupants of the Cessna and four airport workers on the ground.
- October 10 - Flightline Flight 101 crashes into the Mediterranean Sea near the Columbretes Islands after a lightning strike, killing all 10 on board.
- October 31 – Air Canada Jetz, operated by Air Canada, commences operations.

=== November ===
- bmi begins transatlantic flights from Manchester in the United Kingdom after a failed attempt to start transatlantic flights from London Heathrow Airport.
- British Airways aborts a plan to take over KLM due to technical issues in the Treaty on Open Skies between the United States and the Netherlands.
- British Airways drops its controversial ethnic tailfins, which it had first adopted in 1997. It had initially slowed the process of adopting the tailfins in 1999; finally Chief Executive Rod Eddington decides that all aircraft will be painted with the new Union Flag livery, which had been one of the "ethnic" designs.
- Aeropostal Alas de Venezuela (LAV) begins service between Venezuela the Madrid, Spain.
- November 1 – Alitalia becomes a member of the Skyteam airline alliance.
- November 7 – The bankrupt Belgian airline SABENA ceases operations, having gone into liquidation the previous day.
- November 12 – New York City suffers its second plane disaster in as many months when American Airlines Flight 587, an Airbus A300-600, crashes in Queens, New York, shortly after takeoff from John F. Kennedy International Airport due to mechanical failure, killing all 260 people on board and five people on the ground.
- November 14 – An American airstrike south of Kabul, Afghanistan, kills senior al Qaeda leader Mohammed Atef, among others.
- November 19 – The Transportation Security Administration, a component of the United States Department of Transportation, begins operation. It has broad responsibilities for and powers related to ensuring the safety of the traveling public in the United States, but the bulk of its efforts are devoted to civil aviation, most notably the screening of passengers and baggage at over 450 airports in the United States.
- November 20 – A Royal Order creates Belgium′s Federal Public Service Mobility and Transport. Among other things, it serves as Belgium's national civil aviation authority, and it includes an Air Accident Investigation Unit, responsible for investigating aviation accidents and incidents in Belgium.
- November 24 – On approach to Zurich-Kloten Airport in Kloten near Zürich, Switzerland, in rain, snow, and poor visibility due to low clouds, Crossair Flight 3597, an Avro RJ100 (registration HB-IXM), crashes into a wooded range of hills near the small town of Bassersdorf about 4 kilometers (2.5 miles) short of the runway, where it breaks apart and bursts into flames, killing 24 of the 33 people on board. Melanie Thornton, the lead singer of the Eurodance group La Bouche, and singers Nathaly(i.e.) van het Ende and Maria Serrano Serrano of the German pop music group Passion Fruit are among the dead. Singer Debby St. Maarten of Passion Fruit survives with severe injuries.

=== December ===
- December 1 – Afriqiyah Airways begins flight operations. It operates Boeing 737-400 airliners.
- December 2
  - The 71-year history of Trans World Airlines (TWA) comes to an end, as it officially completes its merger into American Airlines. TWA had been created in October 1930.
  - Chautauqua Airlines, Corporate Airlines, and Trans States Airlines, which previously had operated in partnership with TWA under the Trans World Express brand, begin operating under the AmericanConnection brand as part of TWA's merger with American Airlines. Under the AmericanConnection brand, they become members of the Oneworld airline alliance.
- December 4 – Israeli Air Force aircraft strike Gaza International Airport in Gaza City in the Gaza Strip, destroying its control tower and radar facility. The airport closes after only three years of operation.
- December 5
  - Emery Worldwide is officially liquidated.
- December 22 – Aboard American Airlines Flight 63 – a Boeing 767 halfway across the Atlantic Ocean during a flight from Paris, France, to Miami, Florida, with 197 people on board – Richard Reid unsuccessfully attempts to detonate a bomb hidden in his shoe. He is subdued by passengers and the airliner, escorted by U.S. Air Force fighters, diverts to Logan International Airport in Boston, Massachusetts, where he is arrested.
- December 23 – During the 75-day period since 7 October, American aircraft have conducted 6,500 airstrikes in Afghanistan, dropping 17,500 munitions.
- December 28 – USA3000 Airlines begins operations.

== First flights ==
=== January ===
- January 4 – The HAL Light Combat Aircraft's (LCA's) first technology demonstrator, TD-1.

=== February ===
- February 2 – Prototype General Atomics RQ-1 Predator B, later redesignated MQ-9 Reaper.

=== July ===
- July 21 – XCOR EZ-Rocket, flown by Dick Rutan.
- July 27 – Sukhoi Su-38

== Entered service ==
=== May ===
- May 18 – Dassault Rafale, with the Flottille 12F squadron

=== November ===
- RQ-4A Global Hawk, with the United States Air Force

== Deadliest crash ==
2001 remains the deadliest year for aviation in history. The September 11 attacks marked the deadliest ever act of terrorism in history; an estimated 2,977 people were killed along with the 19 hijackers who commandeered four aircraft in the United States and crashed them into targets including the World Trade Center in New York City, The Pentagon in Washington, D.C., and in Shanksville, Pennsylvania. Alongside the attacks, which changed aviation significantly in following years, there were many notable accidents both before and after September 11 that have left a lasting impact on the industry. The deadliest such crash took place when American Airlines Flight 11, the first aircraft hijacked in the September 11 attacks, crashed into the North Tower of the World Trade Center, killing all 92 people on board and at least 1,600 in the North Tower.

The deadliest non-terrorist crash took place American Airlines Flight 587, an Airbus A300, crashed in Belle Harbor, Queens, shortly after taking off from John F. Kennedy International Airport on 12 November, two months and a mere few miles from the main site of the 9/11 attacks, killing all 260 people on board, as well as five on the ground. As 9/11 was a terrorist attack, Flight 587 is also the deadliest commercial aviation accident in the 2000s decade.
