= Air Somalia =

Somali private airline

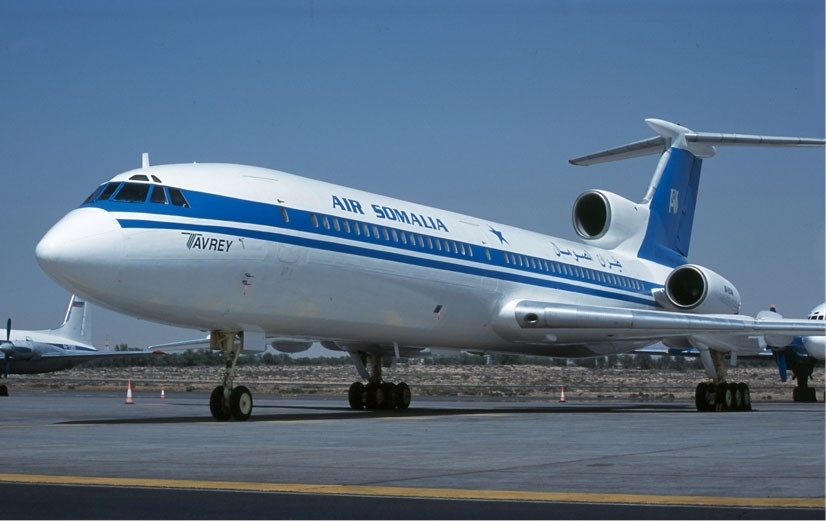
- Air Somalia Tupolev Tu-154 at Sharjah International Airport
IATA	ICAO	Call sign
—	RSM	AIR SOMALIA
- Founded: 2001
- Commenced operations: February 14, 2001
- Ceased operations: 2002
- Hubs: Aden Adde International Airport
- Fleet size: 1
- Headquarters: Mogadishu, Somalia
- Key people: Ali Farah Abdulleh (CEO)
- Website: airsomalia.com ^{a}

Notes
- a. Archived from Wayback Machine.

Air Somalia was a privately owned airline based in Somalia. It was the first private airline owned entirely by Somali nationals.

== Overview ==
The carrier was established in 2001. It provided internal passenger and international services to destinations in Africa and the Middle East. Air Somalia is now out of service, and in 2002 its one Tupolev Tu-154 they had was stored and later scrapped. In 2002, Air Somalia reported it ceased all operations and has liquidated all of its assets.

== History ==
Air Somalia was banned from flying to Somaliland in June 2001. It was suspected that the airline was practicing unsafe flights. Somali media accused the ban of being unfair, claiming that the reason for the ban was that the airline name included the word "Somalia" and possessed a Somali star. However, Somaliland Minister of Civil Aviation and Air Transport for Somaliland Abdillahi Duale disputed this.

== Fleet ==
=== History ===
Air Somalia had only one aircraft, a Tupolev Tu-154, which had gone through three registration changes while it was owned by Air Somalia. The aircraft was manufactured sometime in the 1990s. It was owned by five previous airlines, Aeroflot, Latavio-Baltic International, Latavio, Tavria and Tavria Mak. It was finally given to Air Somalia on 21 December 2000. It was stored on 17 January 2002. The aircraft was seen at Dubai International Airport on 31 October 2002, and again at Sharjah International Airport on 28 January 2003.

=== Registration changes ===
During its time with Air Somalia, the Tupolev Tu-154 has had its tail number changed four times. When the plane was delivered to Air Somalia, its registration number was UR-85546. On 21 September 2001, its registration was changed to ER-TAI, to later be changed back to UR-85546 on 3 November 2001. Its registration number was changed for the final time to ER-TAI on 30 December 2001.

=== Table ===
Fleet
Aircraft	Count	Passengers			Notes	Refs
Aircraft	Count	C	Y	Total	Notes	Refs
Tupolev Tu-154	1				Tail number fluctuated between UR-85546 and ER-TAI.	
Total	1					

== See also ==
- Jubba Airways
- Daallo Airlines
- Somali Airlines
