= Scandinavian Airlines System Flight 871 =

1960 aviation accident in Turkey

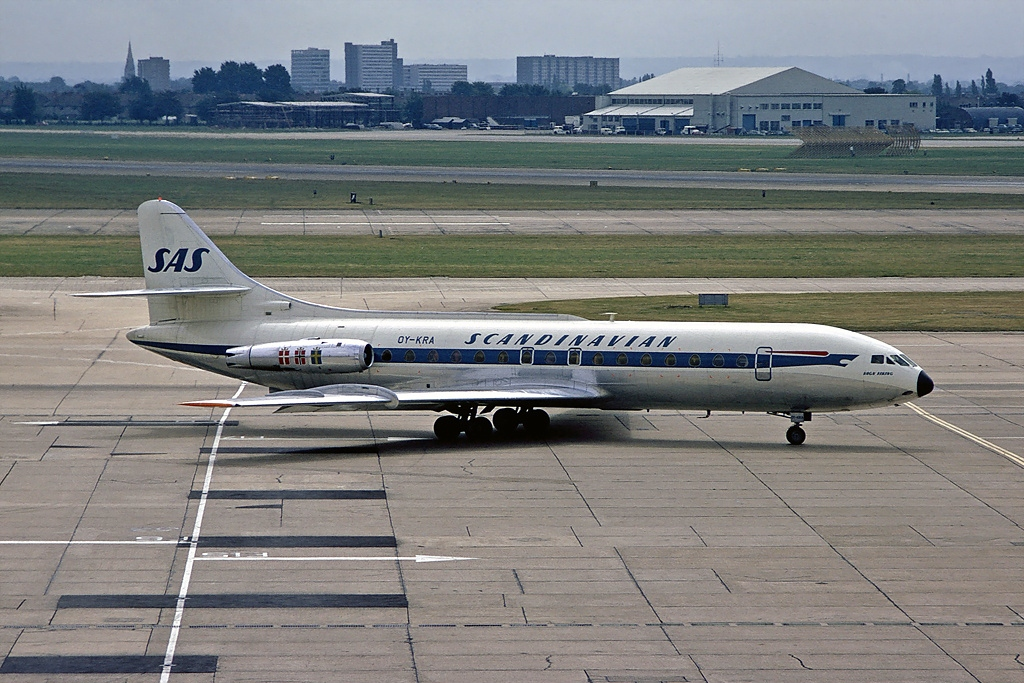
- A SAS Caravelle I similar to the accident aircraft

Accident
- Date: 19 January 1960
- Summary: Controlled flight into terrain
- Site: Near Esenboğa International Airport, Turkey, at approximately 40°01′03.79″N 32°55′07.73″E

Aircraft
- Aircraft type: Sud Aviation SE-210 Caravelle I
- Aircraft name: Orm Viking
- Operator: Scandinavian Airlines System
- Registration: OY-KRB
- Flight origin: Copenhagen, Denmark
- Stopover: Düsseldorf, Germany
- 2nd stopover: Vienna, Austria
- 3rd stopover: Istanbul, Turkey
- 4th stopover: Ankara, Turkey
- Destination: Cairo, Egypt
- Occupants: 42
- Passengers: 35
- Crew: 7
- Fatalities: 42
- Survivors: 0

Scandinavian Airlines System Flight 871 was a scheduled flight from Copenhagen in Denmark to the Egyptian capital of Cairo, with several intermediate stops, operated by Scandinavian Airlines System. On 19 January 1960, the Sud Aviation Caravelle flying the service crashed while operating a leg between Yeşilköy Airport, Turkey and Esenboğa International Airport in Turkey. The flight was on approach but crashed 6 NM (11 km; 7 mi) from the airport, killing all 42 occupants on board. This was the first fatal crash of a Caravelle.

== Accident ==
Flight 871 took off from Copenhagen Airport at 09:44 UTC. The aircraft had already stopped at Düsseldorf in Germany and Vienna in Austria before arriving at Istanbul at 17:20 UTC, where a fresh crew boarded the aircraft to operate the remaining portion of the flight. It departed Istanbul's Yeşilköy Airport at 18:00 UTC on a flight to Ankara's Esenboğa International Airport in Turkey. There were 35 passengers and 7 crew on board the aircraft. The flight was uneventful until the crew started the approach to the airport. At 18:41 UTC the crew reported to air traffic control that the aircraft was in a descent from FL135 (approximately 13,500 ft (4,100 m)) to FL120 (approximately 12,000 ft (3,700 m)). At 18:45 UTC the crew reported inbound passing an altitude of 6,500 ft (2,000 m) on the descent. At 18:47 UTC the aircraft struck the ground at an elevation of 3500 feet (1,067 m), between the Ankara range and the airport. The accident killed all 42 passengers and crew on board.

== Cause ==
"The accident occurred because of an unintentional descent below the authorized minimum flight altitude during final descent approach to Esenboga Airport. The reason for this descent could not be ascertained due to lack of conclusive evidence."
