= 1948 Northwood mid-air collision =

Mid air collision over UK

Accident
- Date: 4 July 1948
- Summary: Mid-air collision
- Site: Northwood, London, United Kingdom; 51.60°N 0.453°W
- Total fatalities: 39
- Total survivors: 0

First aircraft
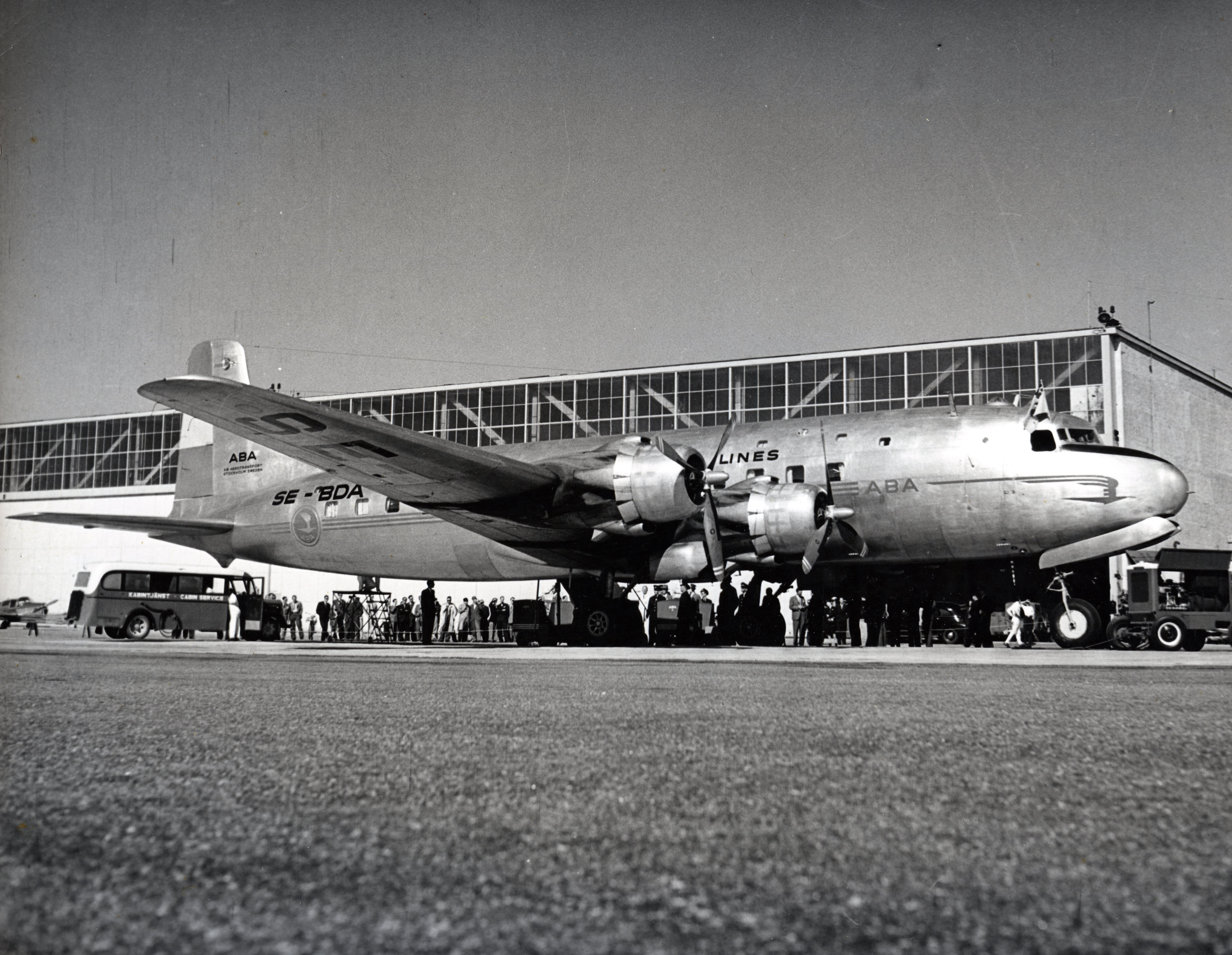
- SE-BDA, the aircraft involved in the accident, seen in the AB Aerotransport livery
- Type: Douglas DC-6
- Name: Agnar Viking
- Operator: Scandinavian Airlines System
- Registration: SE-BDA
- Flight origin: Stockholm Bromma Airport, Sweden
- Stopover: Amsterdam Airport Schiphol, Netherlands
- Destination: RAF Northolt, London, United Kingdom
- Occupants: 32
- Passengers: 25
- Crew: 7
- Fatalities: 32
- Survivors: 0

Second aircraft
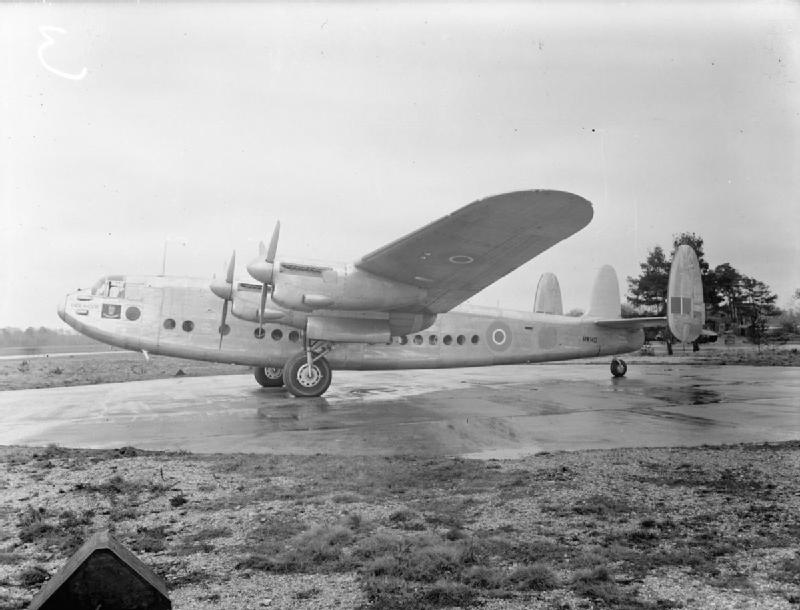
- RAF Avro York similar to the one in the collision
- Type: Avro York C.1
- Operator: 99 Squadron, Royal Air Force
- Registration: MW248
- Flight origin: RAF Luqa, Malta
- Destination: RAF Northolt, London, United Kingdom
- Occupants: 7
- Passengers: 1
- Crew: 6
- Fatalities: 7
- Survivors: 0

The 1948 Northwood mid-air collision took place on 4 July at 15:03 when a Douglas DC-6 of Scandinavian Airlines System (SAS) and an Avro York C.1 of the Royal Air Force (RAF) collided in mid-air over Northwood in London, UK (then in Middlesex). All thirty-nine people aboard both aircraft were killed. It was SAS's first fatal aviation accident and was at the time the deadliest civilian aviation accident in the UK. It is still the deadliest mid-air collision in British history.

The DC-6, registration SE-BDA and named Agnar Viking, was on an international scheduled flight from Stockholm via Amsterdam to London's RAF Northolt. The Avro York of the 99 Squadron, with serial number MW248, was on a flight from RAF Luqa in Malta to RAF Northolt. The aircraft were two of four participating in a stacking at Northolt. At the time of the accident, the SAS aircraft was holding at 2,500 feet while the RAF aircraft was holding at 3,000 feet. However, due to an error in the setting of the atmospheric pressure compensation of the RAF aircraft, it may have been lower. At the time of the collision the DC-6 was ascending, as the pilots had minutes before having to decide to leave the stacking and divert to Amsterdam.

== Flights ==
The SAS aircraft was flying a regular international scheduled flight from Stockholm Bromma Airport in Sweden via Amsterdam Airport Schiphol in the Netherlands to RAF Northolt in London on 4 July 1948. The aircraft, with Swedish registration SE-BDA and named Agnar Viking, was brand new and had first flown earlier that year. It had twenty-five passengers and a flight crew of seven, making a total of thirty-two people on board.

The Avro York C.1, with serial number MW248, was operated by the 99 Squadron of the Royal Air Force. It was flying a transport mission from RAF Luqa in Malta to RAF Northolt. On board were six crew members and the High Commissioner for the Federation of Malaya Edward Gent, who was returning to London. The weather was poor at the time of the accident.

== Collision ==
Upon arrival in the Northolt area both aircraft were placed in a stacking pattern, which in addition to the two involved aircraft included two other aircraft at higher altitudes. Each stack had an intermediate distance of 500 feet. The stacking was regulated by the air traffic control of Metropolitan Zone. Any aircraft entering the stack had to follow orders from air traffic control, which indicated their altitudes and route, and issued gates allowing the aircraft to enter and leave. Air traffic control issued atmospheric pressure measurements (QFE), allowing the aircraft to synchronise their altimeters.

At 14:12, the York was given permission to enter the Metropolitan Zone at 5,000 feet over Woodley, near Reading. It was at 14:38 told to circle Northolt at 5,000 feet. Air traffic control then gave the Swedish aircraft permission at 14:45 to descend to 2,500 feet. The RAF aircraft was cleared at 14:50 to descend to 4,000 feet. At 14:52 the DC-6 reported "just passed 2,500 feet; going down". The controller reminded the pilot that he was only cleared to 2,500 feet and was not to descend.

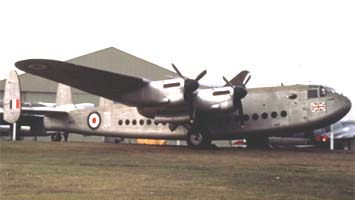
RAF Avro York similar to the one in the collision

Three minutes after the DC-6 report at 2,500 feet, at 14:54, the York was cleared down to 3,000 feet. The DC-6 decided to divert to Amsterdam at 14:59 and informed the tower; it was cleared to leave the area at 2,500 feet at 15:03 although this was not acknowledged by the DC-6. Nothing was heard from the York after 14:45 and it did not acknowledge further clearance down to 1,500 ft at 15:05.

The permission for the York to descend was given at least a minute or two after the DC-6 was cleared from the area, but neither aircraft acknowledged the last messages. At 15:03 the two aircraft collided about 6.4 kilometres (3.5 nmi; 4.0 mi) north of Northolt Aerodrome. An investigation officer from the Ministry of Civil Aviation later reported that the York was above the DC-6, which was climbing. The starboard wing of the DC-6 penetrated the York on the starboard side behind the freight door and detached the York's tail unit.

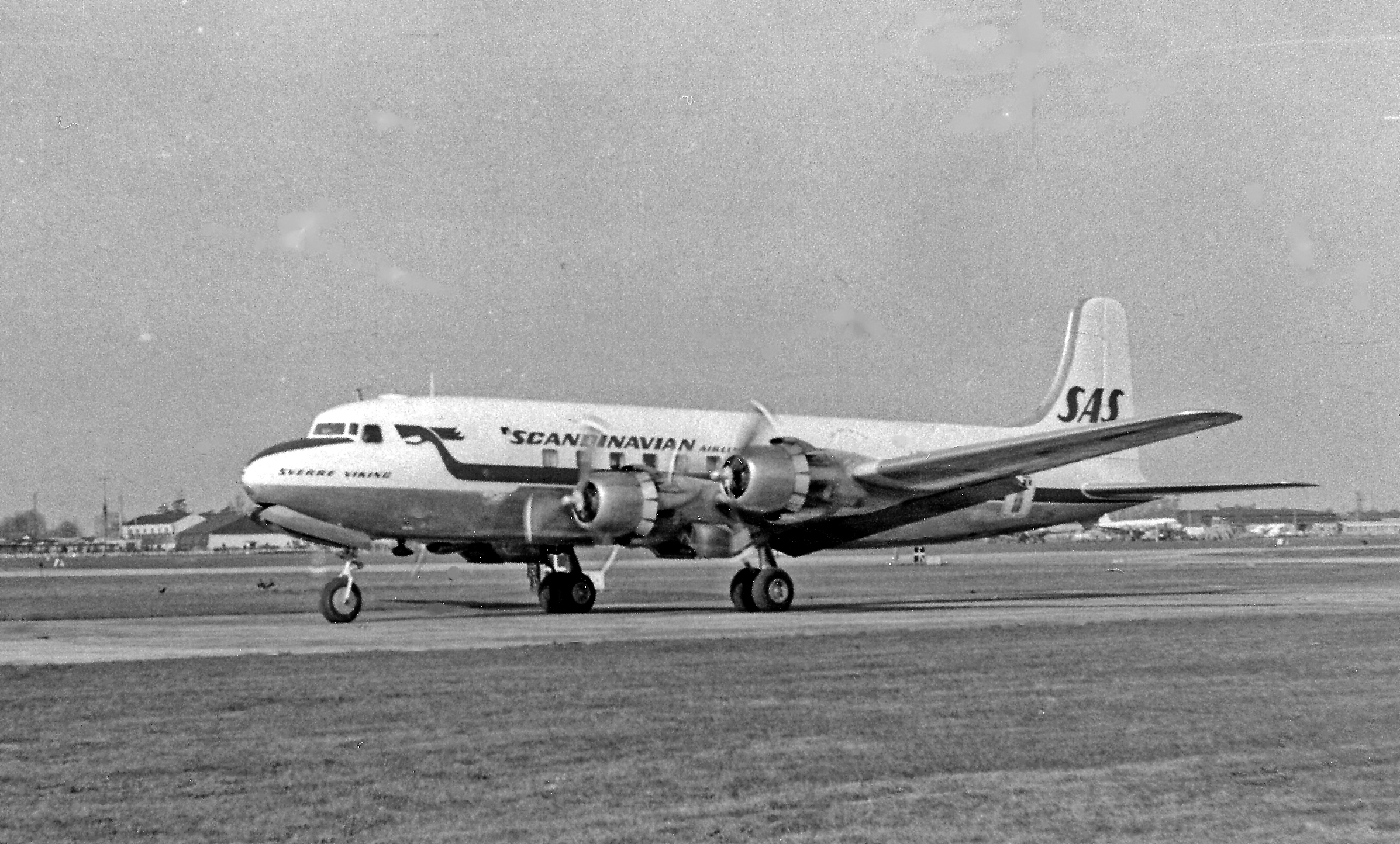
A SAS Douglas DC-6 similar to the one in the collision

Both aircraft crashed into a wood, bursting into flames on impact. After fire and rescue crews put out the fires, the Avro York was found to be completely destroyed by the crash and the only part of the DC-6 that was still intact was the rudder and tailplane, with the rest of the DC-6 also being destroyed by the fire. All seven passengers and crew of the Avro York died and all thirty-two passengers and crew of the DC-6 also died, bringing the total number of deaths to thirty-nine.

The collision was at the time the most lethal aviation accident in the United Kingdom and is still the deadliest mid-air collision in the UK. It now ranks as the fifteenth-most fatal accident in Britain. The accident was SAS's first fatal accident. It was the fourth loss of a DC-6 and the third-most fatal at the time.

== Investigation ==
A week after the accident it was announced that a public inquiry would be held into the accident, only the third such inquiry held in the United Kingdom for an air accident. The inquiry was chaired by William McNair and opened on 20 September 1948.

The inquiry report was published on 21 January 1949. One conclusion found that the height separation in force in the Northolt area of 500 feet provided an inadequate margin of safety and recommended that it be increased to 1,000 feet for the Metropolitan Control Zone. The report also discusses the standard setting for altimeters (known as the regional QFF) that had been introduced in May 1948 for aircraft above 1,500 feet within control zones, and that any error in setting the barometric pressure of one millibar gave an error of 28 feet.

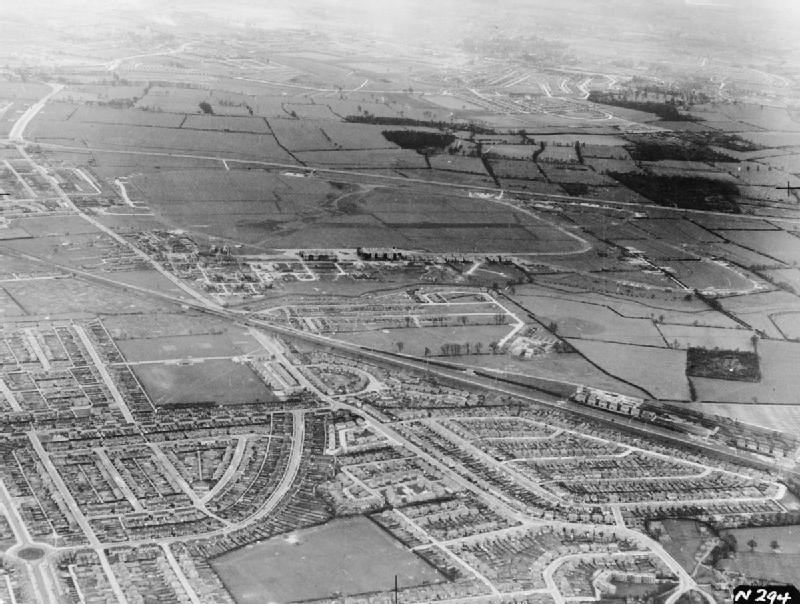
Aerial view of the area surrounding RAF Northolt during the 1940s

While the inquiry was satisfied that the air traffic control system was satisfactory it raised three operational errors of concern which may have contributed to the disaster. Specifically it underlined that the air traffic control issued a landing forecast to the RAF aircraft of a local QFF which could have been interpreted by the pilots as a regional QFF; the air traffic control not transmitting a regional QFF according to schedule; and the broadcasting of a faulty QFF to the SAS crew.

The court found no evidence of error by the Swedish crew, although it noted that the erroneous QFF may have caused the altimeter to be wrong by one millibar. Although there was evidence of a failure to adhere to proper radio communications procedure, it probably was not a factor in the accident. The report stated there was reason to believe that the York's altimeters were set a lot higher than the Regional QFF. This may have been caused by using the wrong QFF sent earlier by the controller or that the altimeters were still set to the standard mean sea level barometric pressure.

None of the evidence established the cause of the collision. However, in the opinion of the court of inquiry the cause would probably be found in one of the factors mentioned. It also noted that although the air traffic system was satisfactory, not all of the procedures involved appeared to have been equally promulgated. It therefore came with a series of recommendations:

- Broadcast of the regional QFF should be done on time and as a priority
- All clearances into a control zone should include the regional QFF and any local reading should not be given
- Altimeter setting messages should be sent on their own and not included in other messages to avoid confusion
- Air traffic procedures should be uniformly applicable to all users
- Air traffic officers should be examined periodically
- Ensure that there is no possibility of controllers confusing future regional QFF with the current QFF
- RAF crews should be given more information on procedures in the Metropolitan Control Zone.

The issue of flight stacking was debated at the time. This had largely focused on the problems with icing, but the collision at Northwood brought the attention of the risks of too little vertical distance between aircraft in the stack. In November 1948, after the inquiry had closed, the Ministry of Civil Aviation increased the vertical separation distance between aircraft in control zones from 500 feet to 1000 feet.
