= 2007 Bombardier Dash 8 landing gear accidents =

Aircraft accidents in Denmark

Scandinavian Airlines System Flight 1209
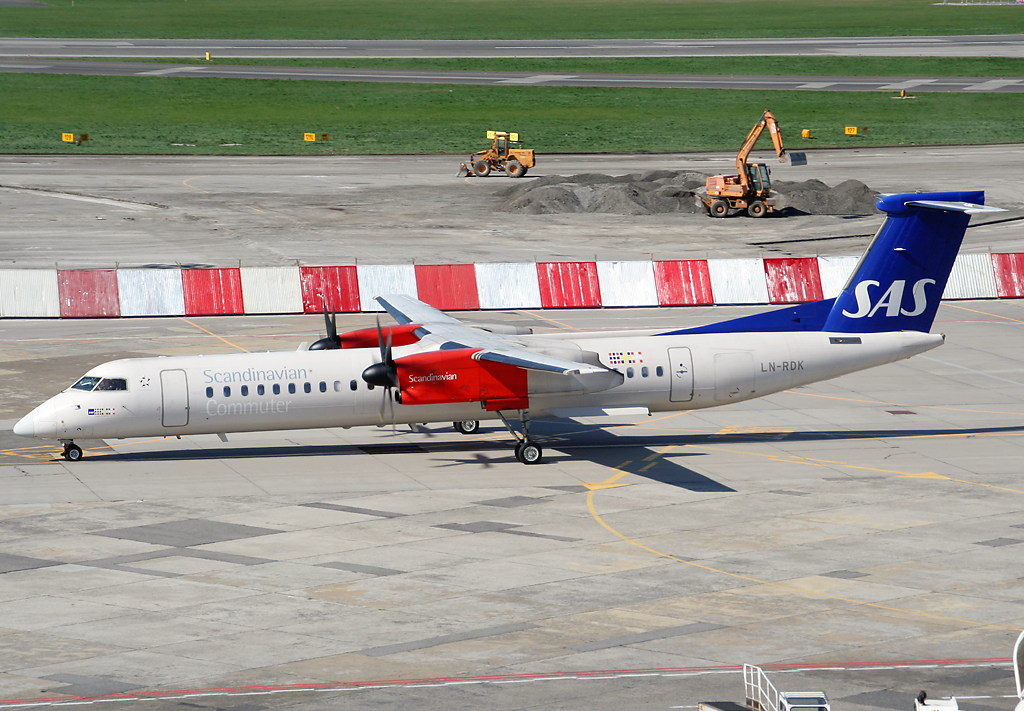
- LN-RDK, the aircraft involved in the first of these accidents, seen April 2007

Accident
- Date: 9 September 2007
- Summary: Landing gear failure
- Site: Aalborg Airport, Denmark

Aircraft
- Aircraft type: Bombardier Dash 8-400 (Q400)
- Aircraft name: Ingrid Viking
- Operator: Scandinavian Airlines System
- IATA flight No.: SK1209
- ICAO flight No.: SAS1209
- Call sign: SCANDINAVIAN 1209
- Registration: LN-RDK
- Flight origin: Copenhagen Airport
- Destination: Aalborg Airport
- Occupants: 73
- Passengers: 69
- Crew: 4
- Fatalities: 0
- Injuries: 5
- Survivors: 73

Scandinavian Airlines System Flight 2748
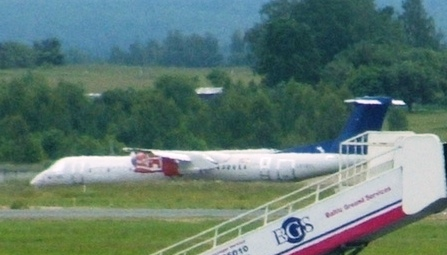
- The aftermath of LN-RDS after landing at Vilnius airport

Accident
- Date: 12 September 2007
- Summary: Landing gear failure
- Site: Vilnius International Airport, Lithuania

Aircraft
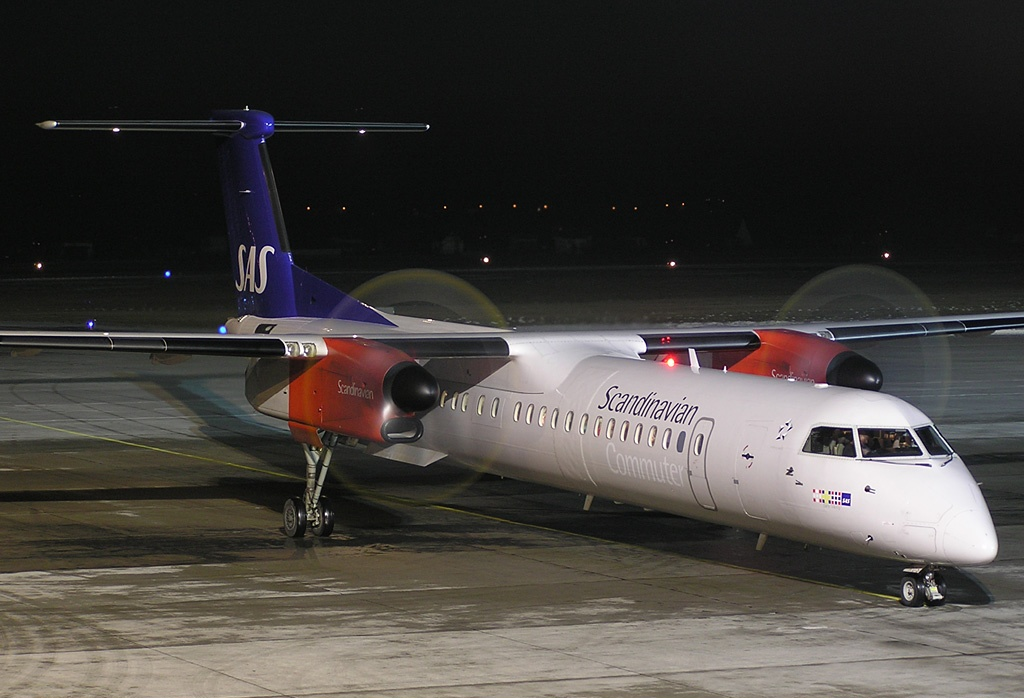
- LN-RDS, the aircraft involved, seen in 2005
- Aircraft type: Bombardier Dash 8-400 (Q400)
- Aircraft name: Göte Viking
- Operator: Scandinavian Airlines System
- IATA flight No.: SK2748
- ICAO flight No.: SAS2748
- Call sign: SCANDINAVIAN 2748
- Registration: LN-RDS
- Flight origin: Copenhagen Airport
- Destination: Palanga International Airport
- Occupants: 52
- Passengers: 48
- Crew: 4
- Fatalities: 0
- Survivors: 52

Scandinavian Airlines System Flight 2867
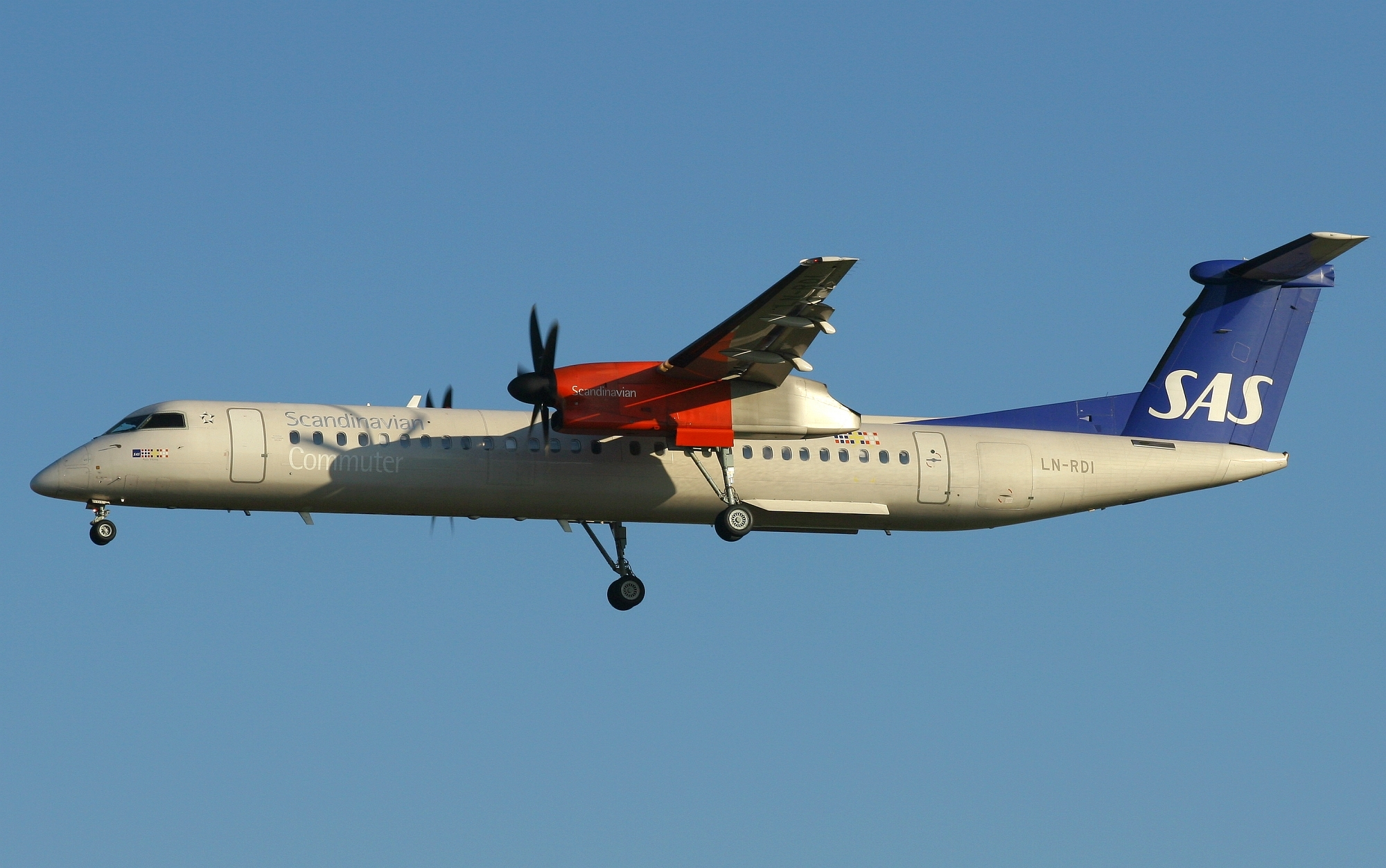
- LN-RDI, the aircraft involved in the accident, in 2006

Accident
- Date: 27 October 2007
- Summary: Landing gear failure
- Site: Copenhagen Airport, Denmark

Aircraft
- Aircraft type: Bombardier Dash 8-400 (Q400)
- Aircraft name: Asta Viking
- Operator: Scandinavian Airlines System
- IATA flight No.: SK2867
- ICAO flight No.: SAS2867
- Call sign: SCANDINAVIAN 2867
- Registration: LN-RDI
- Flight origin: Bergen Airport, Norway
- Destination: Copenhagen Airport, Denmark
- Occupants: 44
- Passengers: 40
- Crew: 4
- Fatalities: 0
- Survivors: 44

In September 2007, two separate accidents due to similar landing gear failures occurred within three days of each other on Bombardier Dash 8 Q400 aircraft operated by Scandinavian Airlines System (SAS). A third accident, again with an SAS aircraft, occurred on 27 October 2007, leading to the withdrawal of the type from the airline's fleet.

== Scandinavian Airlines System Flight 1209 ==
Scandinavian Airlines System Flight 1209, a Bombardier Dash 8 Q400 registered as LN-RDK, took off from Copenhagen Airport, Denmark, on 9 September 2007. It was on a domestic flight to Aalborg Airport.

Prior to landing, the right main landing gear failed to lock and the crew circled for an hour while trying to fix the problem then preparing for an emergency landing. After the aircraft touched down, the right landing gear collapsed, the right wing hit the ground, and a fire broke out. The fire went out before the aircraft came to rest and all passengers and crew were evacuated. Five people had minor injuries, some from parts of the propeller entering the cabin and others from the evacuation.

=== Investigation ===
When the handle for lowering the landing gear was activated, the indicator showed two green and one red light. The red light indicated that the right main gear was not locked in position. The landing was aborted. Attempts at lowering the gear manually were also unsuccessful. An investigation into the cause of the failure to deploy revealed that the right main gear hydraulic actuator eyebolt had broken away from the actuator. A further analysis of the actuator showed corrosion of the threads on both the inside threads of the piston rod and the outside threads of the rod end, leading to reduced mechanical strength of the actuator and eventual failure.

On 19 September 2007, the prosecutor of Stockholm commenced a preliminary investigation regarding suspicion of endangering another person.

=== Maintenance procedures ===
Scandinavian Airlines System (SAS) was accused of cutting corners in the maintenance of its Q400 aircraft. As the Swedish Civil Aviation Administration began an investigation of the accident, it brought renewed focus on SAS maintenance procedures. (Only two weeks previously, Swedish authorities had levelled a scathing critique at the airline after an aircraft of the same model nearly crashed because its engine accelerated unexpectedly during landing.) The outcome of the investigation was that the cause was not a lack of maintenance but over-cleaning of the landing gear, with pressure washers being used that washed out the corrosion preventative coatings between the eyebolt and the actuator rod end. The airline reportedly made 2,300 flights in which safety equipment was not up to standard, although the airline denied this.

AIB Denmark (Havarikommissionen) noted that the use of different alloys in the bolt and surrounding construction was most probably a contributing factor:

It is evident that the corrosion had attacked the piston rod threads that were in direct engagement with the rod end threads whereas the corrosion attacked in the key way area and in the non-engaged threads was less severe. This suggested that galvanic action between the nobler martensitic stainless steel and the less noble 4340 steel material had enhanced corrosion.

== Scandinavian Airlines System Flight 2748 ==
A second accident occurred when a Bombardier Q400, operating as Scandinavian Airlines System Flight 2748, took off from Copenhagen Airport, Denmark, on 12 September 2007. It was headed to Palanga, Lithuania, but was diverted to Vilnius International Airport when landing gear problems were discovered before landing. Again, the right landing gear collapsed immediately after the aircraft touched down. All passengers and crew were evacuated safely. The local officials at Vilnius International Airport noted that this was the most serious accident in recent years. This accident was also caused by corroded threads in the piston rod and rod end.

== Scandinavian Airlines System Flight 2867 ==
On 27 October 2007, a Q400 registered as LN-RDI was operating SAS Flight 2867 from Bergen, Norway to Copenhagen, Denmark with 40 passengers and 4 crew members when problems with the main landing gear were discovered. After waiting about two hours in the air to burn fuel and troubleshoot, the pilots attempted a prepared emergency landing. The pilots were forced to land the aircraft with the right main landing gear up. The right engine was shut down prior to the landing, because in the previous landings the propeller had hit the ground and shards of it ripped into the fuselage. This was not on the emergency checklist, rather it was the pilots making a safety-based decision. The aircraft stopped on the runway at 16:53 local time with the right wing touching the surface. It did not catch fire and the passengers and the crew were evacuated quickly. There were no serious injuries. The aircraft in question was one of six that had been cleared to fly just a month before, following the grounding of the entire Scandinavian Airlines Q400 fleet due to similar landing gear issues. The entire fleet was grounded again following the accident.

The preliminary Danish investigation determined this latest Q400 accident was unrelated to the airline's earlier corrosion problems; in this particular case being caused by a misplaced o-ring found blocking the orifice in a hydraulic restrictor valve. Accordingly, the European Aviation Safety Agency announced that "...the Scandinavian airworthiness authorities will reissue the Certificates of Airworthiness relevant to this aircraft type in the coming days".

The final report stated:

The Solenoid Sequence Valve (SSV) down port and up port filter elements may not withstand normal Landing Gear hydraulic operational pressure fluctuations and may collapse. At a given time prior to the accident, the SSV down port filter element collapsed and the O-ring located adjacent to the filter element migrated into the hydraulic line. ... the rogue O-ring was transferred from the SSV side of the hydraulic line to the Actuator side of the hydraulic line while trapped inside a Union [when the actuator was replaced and union bolts were interchaged] ... It was the opinion of the mechanic that if an O-ring was hidden inside one of the Unions, it would have been observed. ... However, it was not observed that the O-ring was trapped inside the Union. The AIB can not exclude that a thorough inspection of the Unions according to a defined inspection procedure might have led to a finding of the rogue O-ring. But any inspection done by humans is related to human factors and not a guarantee of any findings. It was proven that the O-ring could be trapped inside the Unions, and it was difficult to observe that fact. Furthermore there was no reason for the mechanic to anticipate that a foreign object was present in the Unions because [the mechanic] was not mentally prepared to find anything. Furthermore, the mechanic was told to do the reconfiguration and was not involved in the trouble shooting on the MLG. Probably, the conception of the work was that it was routine work and for that reason, a foreign object present in any of the Unions was not anticipated.

== Aftermath ==
After the second accident in Vilnius, SAS grounded its entire Q400 fleet consisting of 27 aircraft, and a few hours later the manufacturer Bombardier Aerospace recommended that all Q400 aircraft with more than 10,000 flights stay grounded until further notice, affecting about 60 of the 160 Q400 aircraft then in service worldwide. As a result, several hundred flights were cancelled around the world. Horizon Air grounded nineteen of its aircraft and Austrian Airlines grounded eight.

On 13 September 2007, Transport Canada issued an Airworthiness Directive applicable to Bombardier Q400 turboprop aircraft instructing all Q400 aircraft operators to conduct a general visual inspection of the left and right main landing gear systems and main landing gear retract actuator jam nuts. This effectively grounded all Q400 aircraft until the inspection had been carried out.

On 14 September 2007, Bombardier issued an All-Operators Message (AOM) recommending new procedures concerning the landing gear inspection for all aircraft with more than 8,000 flights. Bombardier acknowledged the likelihood of corrosion developing inside the retract actuator.

Previous maintenance procedures mandated checking this component after 15,000 landings. The new maintenance schedule affected about 85 of the 165 Q400 aircraft worldwide. Some operators found that spare parts for this unexpected actuator replacement program were not available, grounding their aircraft indefinitely.

Investigators detected corrosion inside actuators on 25 of 27 aircraft they checked. Accordingly, SAS decided to continue the grounding of its Q400 fleet until all the affected parts were replaced.

On 28 October 2007, SAS announced that it would retire its entire fleet of Q400 aircraft after a third accident involving the landing gear occurred the day prior.

On 10 March 2008, a multi-party agreement was announced, attempting to finalize the roles of maintenance and manufacture in causing the SAS accidents; as settlement the airline and its partners ordered a replacement set of short-haul aircraft from Bombardier, and in turn received a US$164 million discount.

It has been speculated that a November 2007 shakeup of Bombardier management was spurred by the Q400 landing gear issues.
