= Scandinavian Airlines System Flight 901 =

1984 aviation accident

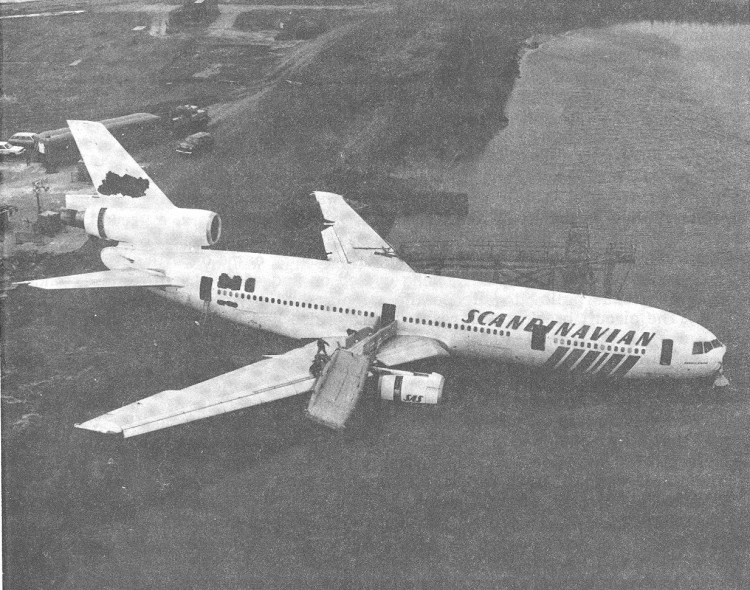
- Flight 901 after overrun

Accident
- Date: February 28, 1984
- Summary: Runway overrun on landing
- Site: 650 ft (200 m) from end of Runway 04R at John F. Kennedy Airport

Aircraft
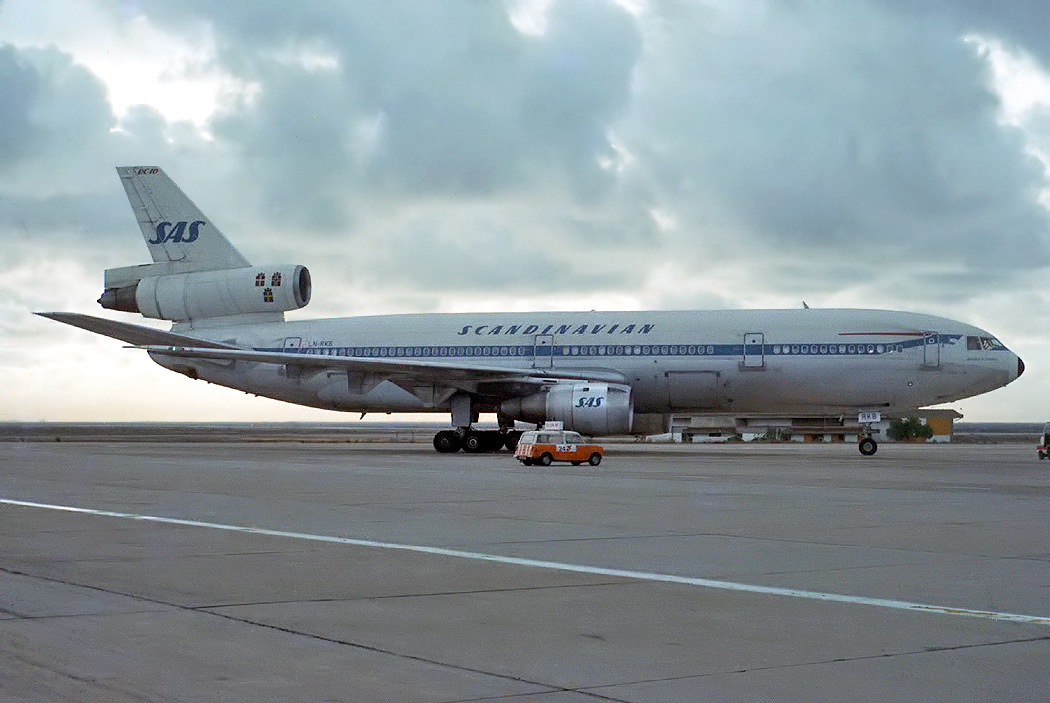
- LN-RKB, the aircraft involved in the accident, seen in a previous livery
- Aircraft type: McDonnell Douglas DC-10-30
- Aircraft name: Haakon Viking
- Operator: Scandinavian Airlines System
- IATA flight No.: SK901
- ICAO flight No.: SAS901
- Call sign: SCANDINAVIAN 901
- Registration: LN-RKB
- Flight origin: Stockholm Arlanda Airport, Stockholm, Sweden
- Stopover: Oslo Airport, Gardermoen, Oslo, Norway
- Destination: John F. Kennedy International Airport, New York City, United States
- Occupants: 177
- Passengers: 163
- Crew: 14
- Fatalities: 0
- Injuries: 12
- Survivors: 177

Scandinavian Airlines System Flight 901, was a scheduled international flight operated by the Scandinavian Airlines System, that overran the runway at its destination at John F. Kennedy International Airport on February 28, 1984. The flight, using a McDonnell Douglas DC-10, originated at Stockholm Arlanda Airport, Sweden, before a stopover at Oslo Airport, Gardermoen, Norway. All 177 passengers and crew members on board survived, although 12 were injured. The runway overshoot was attributed to the crew's failure to monitor their airspeed, and their overreliance on the autothrottle.

== Background ==
=== Aircraft ===
Flight 901 was a McDonnell Douglas DC-10-30, registered as LN-RKB, named the Haakon Viking, and first flown in testing in 1975. Its McDonnell Douglas construction number was 46871/219. The aircraft was equipped with three General Electric CF6-50C engines. It entered into commercial flight service with Scandinavian Airlines in January 1976.

=== Crew ===
The crew consisted of Captain Hans Olof Marner (age 54), First Officer Eddie George Lund (49), Flight Engineer Tord Gronvik (40), and 11 flight attendants. Captain Marner was a highly experienced pilot, having accumulated 18,000 flight hours, of which 2,500 were in the DC-10. First Officer Lund had accumulated 11,000 flight hours, of which 2,500 were in the DC-10.

== Investigation ==
The National Transportation Safety Board (NTSB) investigated the accident. Investigators first thought a probable cause of the overshoot could be hydroplaning since there was bad weather on arrival, but this was later ruled out when investigators inspected the runway and found that the grooves on the runway were in good condition and there were no recent reports of hydroplaning on that runway. The NTSB discovered from eyewitnesses that the airport's control tower could not see the flight arriving due to low visibility. However, they and passengers on the flight reported that the aircraft traveled an unusually long distance before landing. According to the flight's cockpit voice and flight data recorders, the aircraft was at an unusually high speed of 205 knots before landing. It was also noticed that the captain only monitored his airspeed, not the shown ground speed. To avoid striking the approach lighting system, they veered the DC-10 off Runway 04R using the aircraft's rudder. The aircraft came to a rest in shallow water 650 ft (200 m) from Runway 04R.

Investigators discovered that the captain was relying on the aircraft's autothrottle, believing that it would automatically decrease turbine power. NTSB investigators also found that the autothrottle control system had malfunctioned during previous flights. They believe that during the approach, the DC-10's autothrottle had a software malfunction, leading to increased airspeed before touching down. In the NTSB's final report, the probable cause of SAS Flight 901 states that "The flightcrew's disregard for prescribed procedures for monitoring and controlling of airspeed during the final stages of the approach and (b) decision to continue the landing rather than to execute a missed approach, and (c) overreliance on the autothrottle speed control system which had a history of recent malfunctions".

== Aftermath ==
The NTSB had issued two safety recommendations to the Federal Aviation Administration on November 16, 1984, one day after releasing the final report.

A-84-123: Apply the findings of behavioral research programs and accident/incident investigations regarding degradation of pilot performance as a result of automation to modify pilot training programs and flight procedures so as to take full advantage of the safety benefits of automation technology.

A-84-124: Direct air carrier principal operations inspectors to review the airspeed callout procedures of assigned air carriers and, where necessary, to require that these procedures specify the actual speed deviations (in appropriate increments, i.e., +10, +20, -10, -20, etc.) from computed reference speeds.

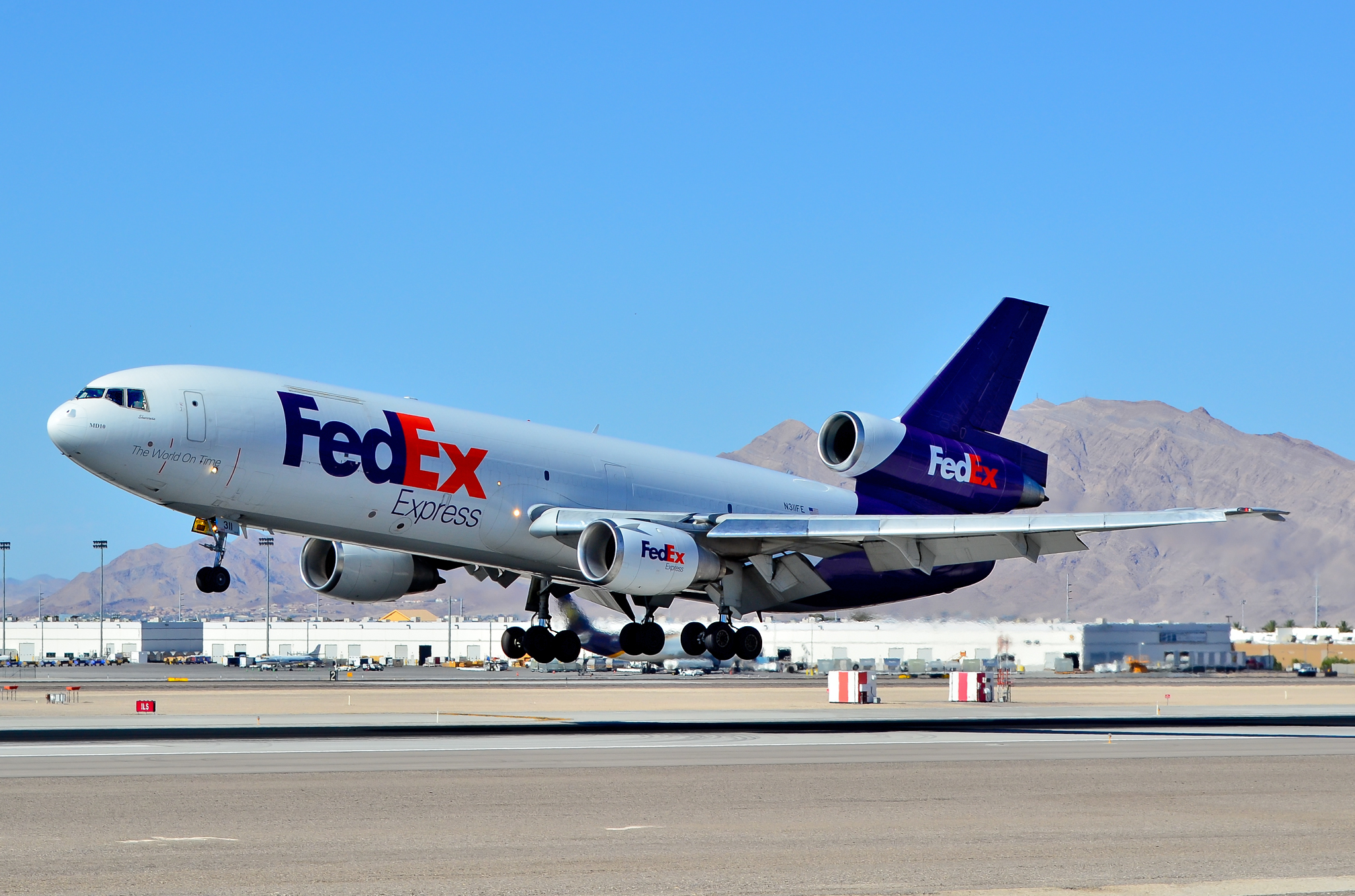
The aircraft, now in service with FedEx Express under the registration of N311FE, seen in 2014

After the accident, mechanics found that LN-RKB suffered substantial damage, but was later repaired and returned to service, until it was bought by Federal Express in 1985, reregistered as N311FE, and converted into a freighter. It was withdrawn from use and stored in 2012; in 2013, it was returned to service. The aircraft would operate for FedEx Express, before being retired on December 31, 2022. The aircraft would later be acquired by Panamanian freight airline Cargo Three in 2024, making it one of 10 DC-10s still in service in 2025. As of January 2026, the DC10 appears to be parked.
