= Ostrovica =

Ostrovica may refer to:

== Albania ==
- Ostrovicë, or Ostrovica, a mountain

== Bosnia and Herzegovina ==
- Ostrovica, Bosnia and Herzegovina, a village near Kulen Vakuf
  - Ostrovica Castle, a castle

== Croatia ==
- Ostrovica, Croatia, a village near Benkovac, in Lišane Ostrovičke municipality
  - Ostrovica Fortress, a castle
- Oštrovica, an interchange on the A6 motorway in Primorje-Gorski Kotar County

== Serbia ==
- Ostrovica, Niška Banja, a village near Niš
- Ostrvica Fortress, or Ostrovica, a castle
- Ostrovica (Tutin), a village
- Ostrovica (Vladičin Han), a village

== Slovenia ==
- Ostrovica, Hrpelje-Kozina, village in Slovenia

== See also ==
- Ostrvica (disambiguation)
- Ostrovitsa, Bulgaria, a village
