= Croatian Muslims (disambiguation) =

Croatian Muslims are adherents of Islam in Croatia.

The term Croatian Muslims may also refer to:

- Muslim Croats, ethnic Croats who are adherents of Islam
- Ethnic Muslims in Croatia, distinctive minority of ethnic Muslims in Croatia

== See also ==
- Bosnian Muslims (disambiguation)
- Serbian Muslims (disambiguation)
