= Kulenović =

Kulenović or Kulenovic is a surname. Notable people with the surname include:

- Adil Kulenović, Bosnian journalist and founder of Krug99
- Almin Kulenović (born 1973), Bosnian footballer
- Džafer-beg Kulenović (1891–1956), Vice President of the Independent State of Croatia during World War II
- Faruk Kulenović (1952–2026), Croatian-Bosnian basketball coach
- Goran Kulenović (born 1971), Croatian film director and screenwriter
- Katarina Matanović-Kulenović (1913–2003), the first female Croatian pilot and parachutist
- Luka Kulenović (born 1999), Bosnian footballer
- Maya Kulenovic (born 1975), Canadian artist and painter
- Mehmed-beg Kulenović (1776–1806), Ottoman soldier
- Nahid Kulenović (1929–1969), Croatian columnist
- Osman Kulenović (1889–1947), Croatian politician
- Rizah Kulenovic, curator of The Kulenovic Collection
- Slaven Kulenovic (born 1984), Slovene conductor
- Sandro Kulenović (born 1999), Croatian footballer
- Skender Kulenović (1910–1978), Bosniak poet, novelist and dramatist
- Tvrtko Kulenovic (1935–2019), Bosnian novelist, essayist and screenwriter
- Vuk Kulenovic (1946–2017), contemporary composer, living in Boston
- Vladimir Kulenovic, American conductor
- Željko Kulenović (1967-2025), Croatian economic developer
