= Battle of Ostrovica (1737) =

1737 battle

- Part of the Austro-Turkish War of 1737–1739
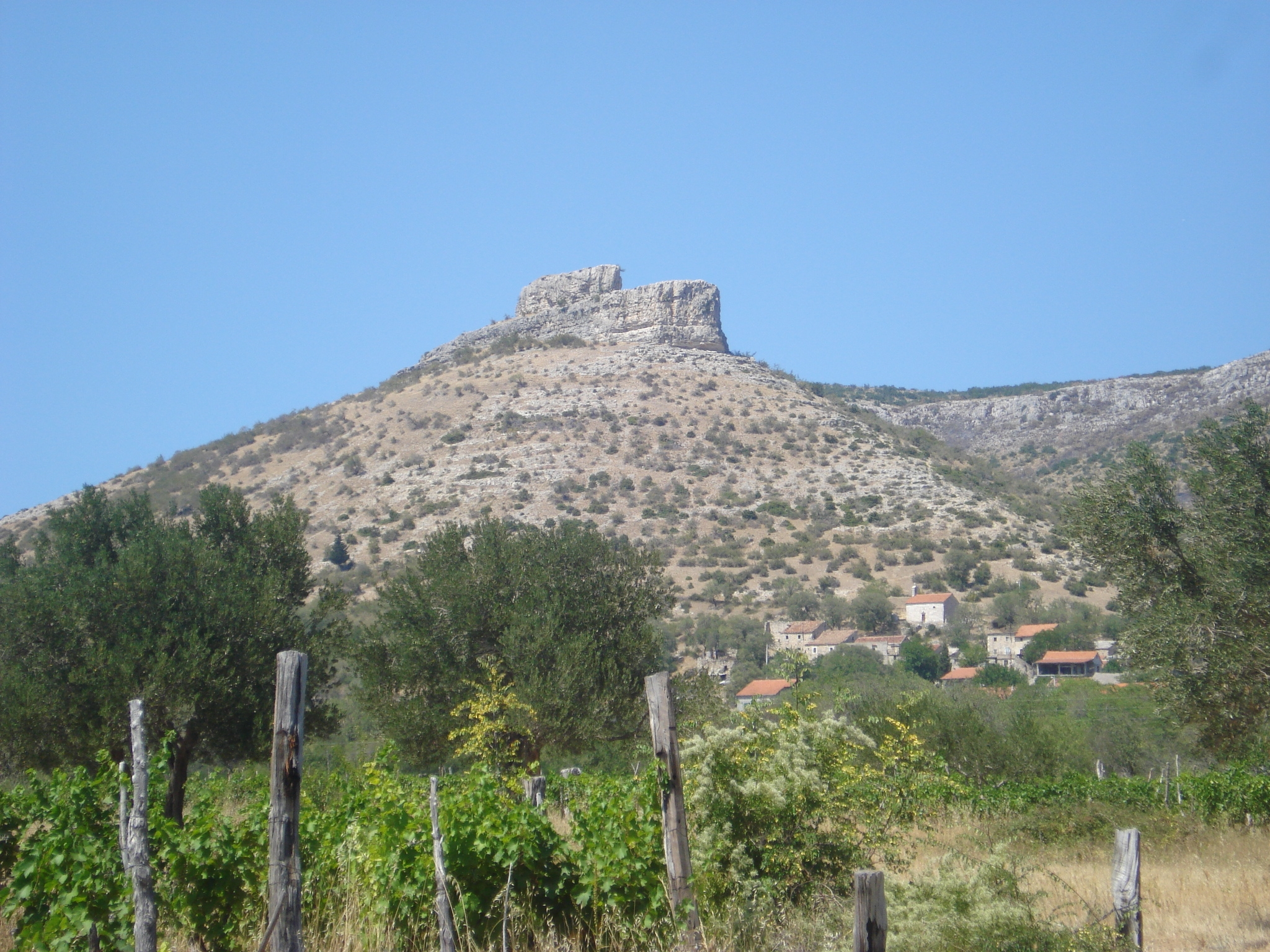
- Ostrovica castle
Date	22 July 1737
Location	Ostrovica Castle
Result	Ottoman victory

Belligerents
Habsburg monarchy	Ottoman Empire

Commanders and leaders
(Habsburg monarchy) Colonel Raunach † (Habsburg monarchy) Major Topp †	Pasha of Travnik

Strength
4,500 men	5,000 men

Casualties and losses
8 officers killed 600 killed 30 captured	Unknown

The Battle of Ostrovica was a military engagement between the Austrians and the Ottomans during the Austro-Turkish War of 1737–1739. The Austrians attacked the Ostrovia castle; however, they were forced to retreat and, in turn, were attacked and routed by the Ottomans.

== Background ==
Four Austrian columns were gathered at Karlovac led by Lieutenant General Stubenberg. He ordered them to advance toward Una Valley. The main column advancing through the Korana valley was led by General Count Herberstein. This crossed the Korana on the night of July 15 to 16 and reached Bihac after some fighting. A side column to the right of it headed towards Dreznik, another to the left towards Cetin, and began to bombard this fortress on July 21.

On the other hand, Colonel Raunach, believing that the Stubenberg and other groups would also cross the border on July 12, as had been previously determined, began his advance from Dobroselo on July 13, adhering to the agreed deadline and crossing the border on the said day; he crossed the Una on July 15.

== Battle ==
Raunach camped two hours from Ostrovica on July 16. Two days later, the Austrians encamped some distance from Ostrovica Castle without having the area reconnoitred. This was the castle the Austrians aimed to capture. The castle stood on a hill on the right bank of the Una River, and on the left was the city of Ostrovica Istelf. The Austrians began digging trenches in the evening due to Ottoman artillery fire. The next day the Austrians began bombarding the castle with two cannons, although one of the cannons exploded after a few shots. News came that the Ottomans were gathering their forces in the area. Nevertheless, the attack continued.

The Austrians had three guns; however, one was exploded on July 21, and the rest could not be brought due to insufficient length, leaving the Austrians with one cannon only. To disperse the Ottoman gathering, Raunach dispatched a force of 800 men, which moved on July 20. However, it was too late, as the Colonel ordered a retreat across Una to secure the line of retreat. The Ottomans attacked the Austrians and were also advancing to Dobroselo. The Colonel decided to open the way to Dobroselo by attacking the advancing Ottoman force; however, he had no time to divide his forces.

After the head of the corps emerged from the Ravines and passed into the plains, the Ottomans attacked them so fiercely that they had no time to fire their rifles. The Austrians were quickly broken; Colonel Raunach was killed alongside Major Topp. The infantry took refuge in the forest while the cavalry, unable to withstand the attack, rushed towards the retreating line detachment, whose men either ran off to bushes, offered resistance in small groups, or fled to baggage and artillery. The ammunition was lost along with the baggage. In this fiasco, the Colonel, 8 officers, and 600 men killed and 30 were captured.

== Aftermath ==
The remnants of the troops, caught in the flank and rear and then completely scattered, only managed to find a way back to Karlovac with great difficulty, and their terrified flight caused all three groups of Lieutenant General Stubenberg to flee in terror.

== Sources ==
- József Bánlaky: Military history of the Hungarian nation (MEK-OSZK), 0014/1149.The military operations of 1737.
- Friedrich Vaníček (1875), Special history of the military frontier, drawn from original sources and source works (In German).
- Gaston Bodart (1908), Military-historical encyclopedia, (1618-1905) (In German).
