= Muslims in Bosnia and Herzegovina (disambiguation) =

In terms of religion, Muslims in Bosnia and Herzegovina are all adherents of Islam in Bosnia and Herzegovina.

Muslims in Bosnia and Herzegovina can also refer to:

== Religion ==
- A majority of ethnic Bosniaks of Bosnia and Herzegovina who are adherents of Islam
- A majority of ethnic Turks of Bosnia and Herzegovina who are adherents of Islam
- A majority of Romani people in Bosnia and Herzegovina who are adherents of Islam

== Ethnicity ==
- Former designation for ethnic Bosniaks in Bosnia and Herzegovina (before 1993)
- Current designation for remaining ethnic Muslims (Muslimani) in Bosnia and Herzegovina

== See also ==
- Bosnian Muslims (disambiguation)
- Religion in Bosnia and Herzegovina
- Demographics of Bosnia and Herzegovina
