= Serbian Muslims (disambiguation) =

Serbian Muslims are adherents of Islam in Serbia.

The term Serbian Muslims may also refer to:

- Muslim Serbs, ethnic Serbs who are adherents of Islam
- Ethnic Muslims in Serbia, distinctive minority of ethnic Muslims in Serbia

== See also ==
- Bosnian Muslims (disambiguation)
- Croatian Muslims (disambiguation)
