= Bosnian Muslims (disambiguation) =

Bosnian Muslims can refer to:

- adherents of Islam in Bosnia and Herzegovina in general, or more specific - just in the region of Bosnia
- former colloquial designation for ethnic Bosniaks of Bosnia and Herzegovina, who are mainly adherents of Islam
- designation for the ethnic Muslims (Muslimani) in Bosnia and Herzegovina

== See also ==
- Muslims in Bosnia and Herzegovina (disambiguation)
- Croatian Muslims (disambiguation)
- Serbian Muslims (disambiguation)
