= Plenibabe =

- Village (Selo)
- Location within Serbia
- Coordinates: 43°02′N 20°19′E
- Country: Serbia
- District: Raška District
- Municipality: Tutin

Population (2002)
  - Total: 123
- Time zone: UTC+1 (CET)
  - Summer (DST): UTC+2 (CEST)

Plenibabe is a village in the municipality of Tutin, Serbia. According to the 2002 census, the village has a population of 123 people. it is a small area largest made up of a few spread out houses and some rural farm land. the only place of note in the town Is the Džamija Plenibabe mosque on its northern edge. on the western side of town it borders the Spomenik prirode "Promuklica" nature preserve in neighboring Ostrovica, Serbia
