= 1961 population census in Bosnia and Herzegovina =

9th Census of Bosnia and Herzegovina
31 March 1961
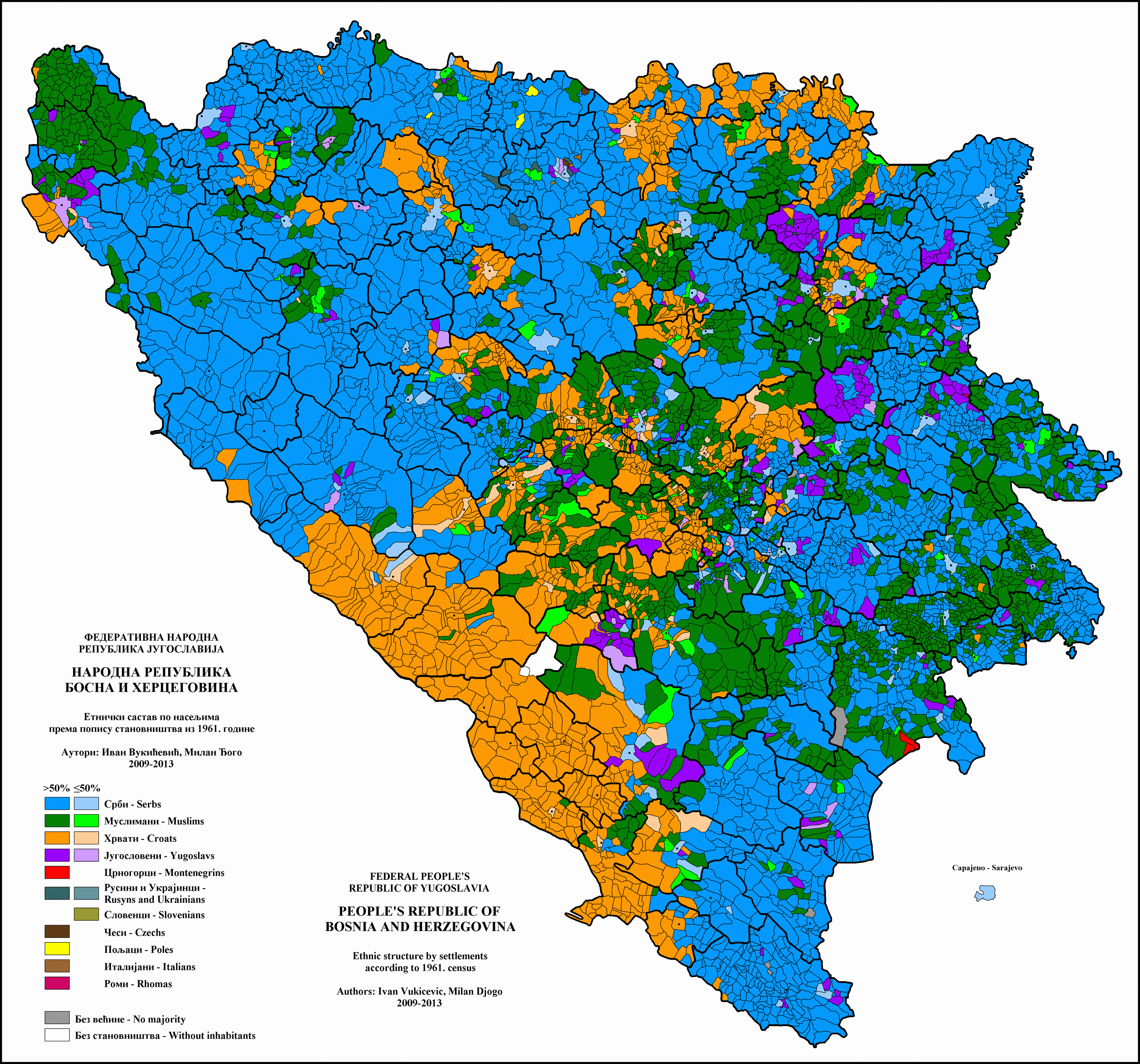
- Ethnic map of Bosnia and Herzegovina in 1961 by settlements

General information
- Country: Socialist Republic of Bosnia and Herzegovina

Results
- Total population: 3,277,935

Population of Bosnia and Herzegovina in 1961 by nationality
1. Serbs (42.9%)
2. Muslims (25.7%)
3. Croats (21.7%)
4. Yugoslavs (8.42%)
5. Others (1.28%)

The 1961 population census in Bosnia and Herzegovina was the ninth census of the population of Bosnia and Herzegovina. The Socialist Federal Republic of Yugoslavia conducted a population census on 31 March 1961. 3,277,935 people populated the territory of Socialist Republic of Bosnia and Herzegovina.

== Overall ==
Nationality	Number	Percentage	Number change	Percentage change
Serbs	1,406,053	42.89%	▲141,681	▼1.51%
Ethnic Muslims	842,247	25.69%	unknown	unknown
Croats	711,660	21.72%	▲57,431	▼1.25%
Yugoslavs	275,883	8.42%	▼615,917	▼22.9%
Montenegrins	12,828	0.39%	unknown	unknown
Ukrainians and Rusyns	6,136	0.19%	unknown	unknown
Slovenes	5,939	0.18%	unknown	unknown
Albanians	3,642	0.11%	unknown	unknown
Macedonians	2,391	0.07%	unknown	unknown
Turks	1,812	0.06%	unknown	unknown
Hungarians	1,415	0.04%	unknown	unknown
Czechs	1,083	0.03%	unknown	unknown
Russians	934	0.03%	unknown	unknown
Poles	801	0.02%	unknown	unknown
Italians	717	0.02%	unknown	unknown
Roma	588	0.02%	unknown	unknown
Jews	381	0.01%	unknown	unknown
Germans	347	0.01%	unknown	unknown
Slovaks	272	0.01%	unknown	unknown
Romanians	113	0.01%	unknown	unknown
Others	811	0.02%	unknown	unknown
Unknown	1,885	0.06%	unknown	unknown
Total	3,277,935	Steady	▲430,476	Steady
