= Osman Kulenović =

Yugoslav politician and lawyer

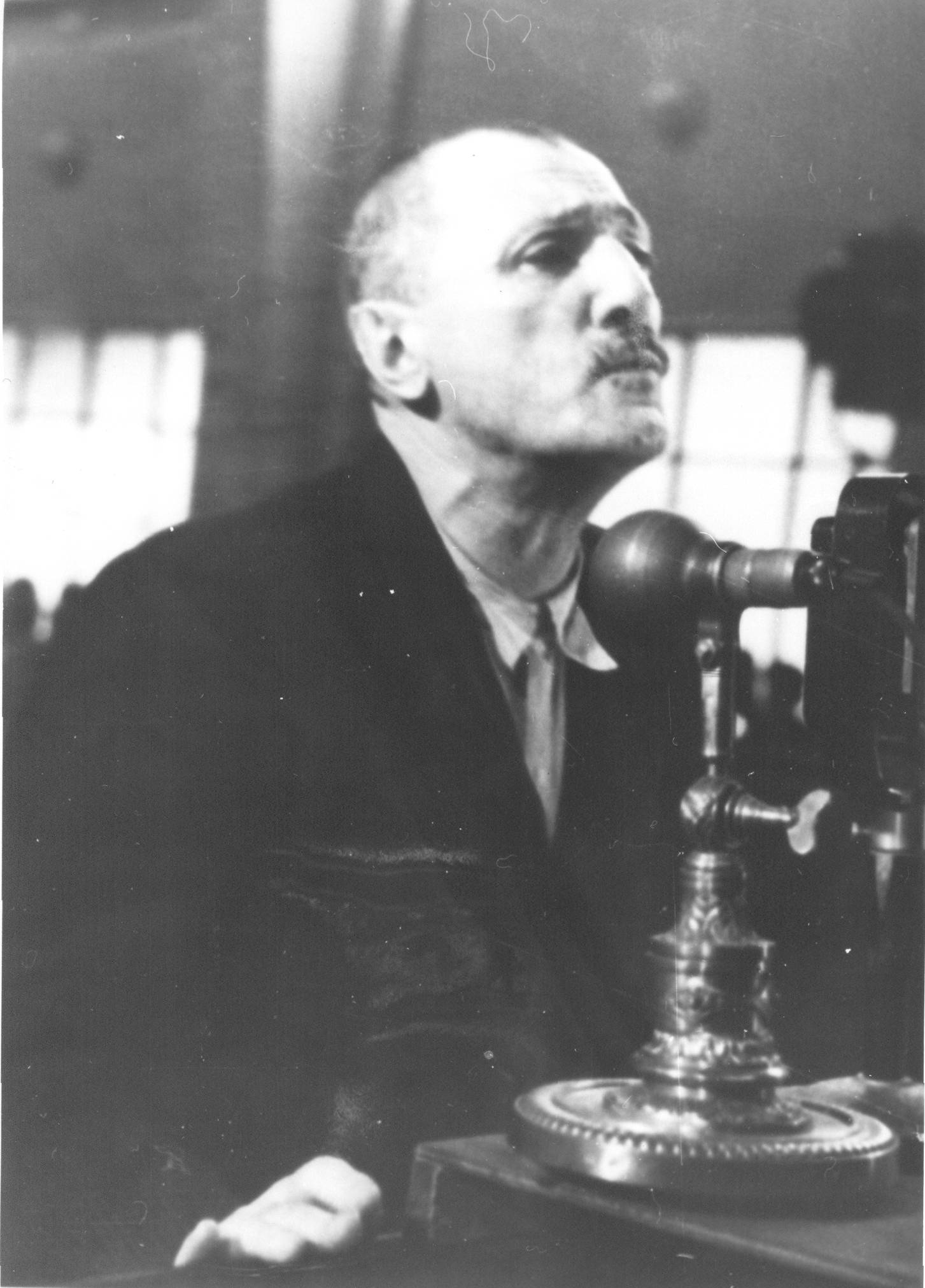
- Kulenović during his trial in 1947

1st Vice President of the Government of the Independent State of Croatia
- In office 16 April 1941 – 7 November 1941
- Leader: Ante Pavelić
- Preceded by: Office established
- Succeeded by: Džafer Kulenović

Personal details
- Born: 15 December 1889 Kulen Vakuf, Bosnia and Herzegovina, Austria-Hungary
- Died: 7 June 1947 (aged 57) Zagreb, PR Croatia, FPR Yugoslavia
- Party: Yugoslav Muslim Organization (until 1941)
- Relations: Džafer Kulenović (brother) Nahid Kulenović (nephew)
- Education: University of Vienna
- Occupation: Politician
- Profession: Lawyer

Osman Kulenović (15 December 1889 – 7 June 1947) was a Yugoslav politician and lawyer, most notable for serving as the Vice President of the Government of the Independent State of Croatia in 1941.

== Early life ==
Osman Kulenović was born to a Croat Muslim family in Kulen Vakuf, present-day Bosnia and Herzegovina. His family settled there in the 17th century from around the town of Udbina in the Croatian region of Lika.

When he entered the University of Zagreb he joined the Party of Rights. During Austrian-Hungarian rule he was among the younger representatives in the Croatian Sabor. His colleague was Ante Pavelić, the future Poglavnik of the Independent State of Croatia. Kulenović graduated from the Faculty of Law, University of Vienna in 1917, where he gained his Ph.D. as well. At the beginning of the 1920s he was the municipality president of Kotor Varoš, but due to his Croatian nationalist views, he was removed from the office. In 1923, after he was removed from the municipal post, he worked as a lawyer in Bihać.

== Independent State of Croatia ==
After the proclamation of the Independent State of Croatia (NDH) in April 1941, Pavelić invited Kulenović to Zagreb and named him vice president of the Government of the Independent State of Croatia on 16 April. Soon Banja Luka and Sarajevo became important political centres of the NDH, alongside Zagreb. Pavelić even considered moving several ministries to Banja Luka. As part of this policy, the vice presidency moved to Banja Luka, where Kulenović continued to work. As vice president, Kulenović visited towns and moved among the people. He informed Pavelić about the atrocities committed against the Serb population. After three months working for the government, Kulenović tendered his resignation, which Pavelić accepted only when he named Osman's brother, Džafer, to the post. In November, the seat of the vice presidency was returned to Zagreb.

Osman Kulenović was part of the Croatian delegation that went to Rome to sign the Treaty of Rome in which Croatia ceded large parts of its coast to Italy. In November 1941 Kulenović was named advisor and was assigned to the Foreign Ministry. In 1943 he greeted the Mufti of Jerusalem, Amin al-Husseini, after which he went to retirement, and lived in Zagreb until the end of the war. On 6 May 1945, he moved with rest of the officials towards Austria. He surrendered to the British authorities and was detained in a prison camp. On 10 October 1946, the British extradited him to the Yugoslav authorities which convicted him and other high-ranking NDH officials including Slavko Kvaternik on 7 June 1947. Kulenović was executed on the same day.
