= Croat Muslims =

Ethno-religious group

Croat Muslims Hrvati muslimani
Total population
- c. 12,200

Regions with significant populations
- Croatia 10,841 (2021); Bosnia and Herzegovina 1,429 (2013); Serbia 12 (2022)

Languages
- Croatian

Religion
- Sunni Islam

Related ethnic groups
- Other Croats, Bosniaks, other Slavic Muslims

Croat Muslims (Croatian: Hrvatski muslimani) or Croat Mohammedans (Croatian: Hrvatski Mohammedanci) are Muslims of Croat ethnic origin. They consist primarily of the descendants of the Ottoman-era Croats.

== Overview ==
Croats are a South Slavic people. According to the published data from the 2021 Croatian census, 10,841 Muslims in Croatia declared themselves as ethnic Croats. The Islamic Community of Croatia is officially recognized by the state. After World War II, thousands of Croats (including those with the Islamic faith) who had supported the Ustaše fled as political refugees to countries such as Canada, Australia, Germany, South America and Islamic countries. The descendants of those Muslim Croats established their Croatian Islamic Centre in Australia in 36 Studley St. Maidstone, Victoria and the Croatian Mosque in Toronto, which is now named Bosnian Islamic Centre, headed by Mr. Kerim Reis.

Croatian Muslims, who had been affiliated with the Ustaše, also fled to the Arab world, in particular Syria.

== History ==
=== Ottoman period ===
The Turkish Ottoman Empire conquered part of Croatia from the 15th to the 19th century and left a deep civilization imprint. Numerous Croats converted to Islam, some after being taken prisoners of war, some through the devşirme system. The westernmost border of Ottoman Empire in Europe became entrenched on Croatian soil. In 1519, Croatia was called the Antemurale Christianitatis ("bulwark of Christendom") by Pope Leo X.

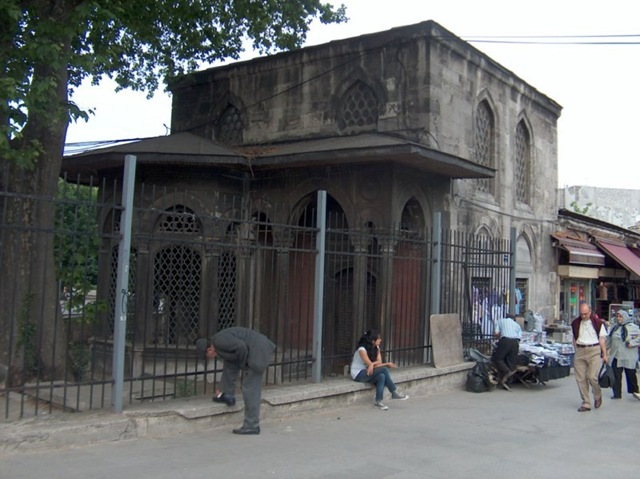
Entrance to the mausoleum Kuyucu Murad Pasha, an Ottoman statesman of Croat origin who served as grand vizier of the Ottoman Empire during the reign of Ahmed I. Part of the complex he had built in Istanbul before his death in 1611 and is today part of Istanbul University.

The fall of Bosnia to the Ottomans in 1463 resulted in increasing pressure on Croatian borders and continual losses of the territory, little by little moving the border line to the west. Permanent warfare during the Hundred Years' Croatian–Ottoman War (1493–1593) drastically reduced Croatian population in affected southeastern regions. Until the end of the 16th century the whole area of Turkish Croatia was occupied by the sultanate. The remaining Croats were converted to Islam and recruited as devşirme (blood tax). A part of the Croatian population managed to flee though, settling down in the northwestern regions of the country or abroad, in the neighbouring Hungary or Austria.

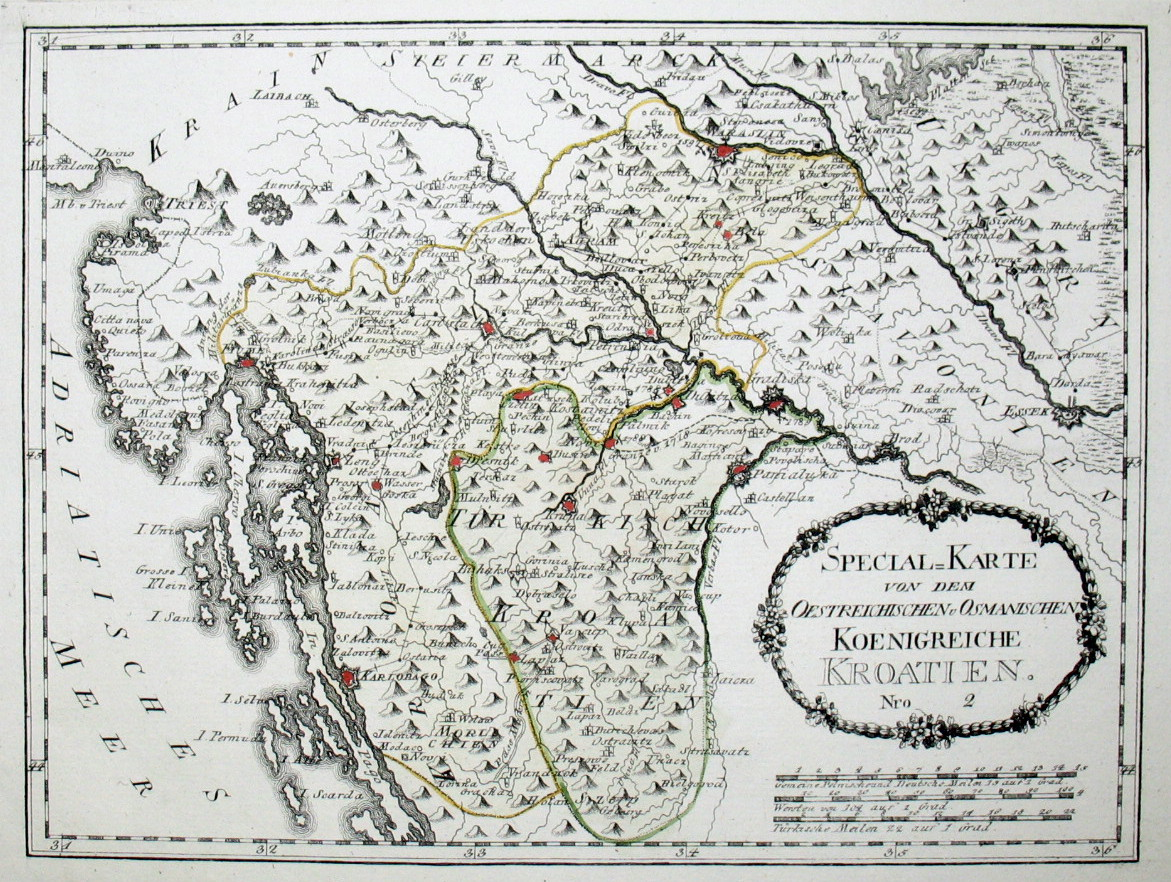
Turkish Croatia (marked by green border line and words "Türkisch Kroatien") on a map from 1791 made by Austrian cartographer Franz J. J. von Reilly

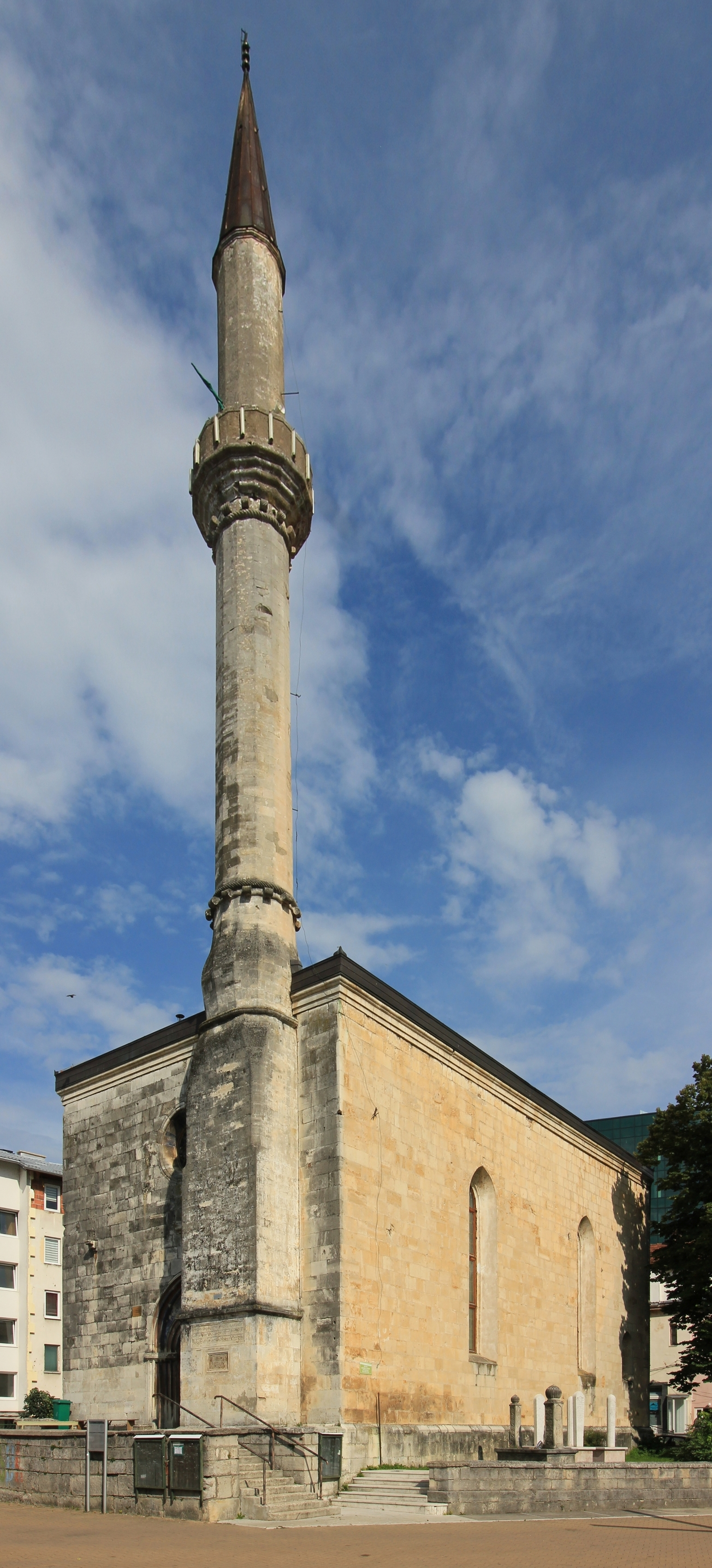
Fethija Mosque, located in the Bosnian city of Bihać, originally a church built in 1266 and one of the few European Islamic places of worship in the Gothic architectural style.

From the 16th to 19th century Turkish Croatia bordered Croatian Military Frontier (Croatian: Hrvatska vojna Krajina, German: Kroatische Militärgrenze), a Habsburg Empire-controlled part of Croatia, which was administered directly from Vienna's military headquarters. In the 19th century, following the Habsburg–Ottoman war in 1878 and the fall of the Bosnia Vilayet, Turkish Croatia remained within the borders of Bosnia and Herzegovina, who 1908 became a new Crown land of the Habsburg Monarchy. Although the (recently renamed) old Croatian territory was liberated, there were very few Croatian population left, i.e. population who actually lived in it registered as Catholics and Croats.

The historical names of many officials in the Ottoman Empire reveal their origin (Hirwat = Hrvat or Horvat, which is a Croatian name for Croat): Veli Mahmud Pasha (Mahmut Pasha Hirwat), Rüstem Pasha (Rustem Pasha Hrvat – Opuković), Piyale Pasha (Pijali Pasha Hrvat), Memi Pasha Hrvat, Tahvil Pasha Kulenović Hrvat etc. There was some considerable confusion over the terms "Croat" and "Serb" in these times, and "Croat" in some of these cases could mean anyone from the wider South Slavic area.

In 1553, Antun Vrančić, Roman cardinal, and Franjo Zay, a diplomat, visited Istanbul as envoys of the Croatian-Hungarian king to discuss a peace treaty with the Ottoman Empire. During the initial ceremonial greetings they had with Rüstem Pasha Hrvat (a Croat) the conversation led in Turkish with an official interpreter was suddenly interrupted. Rustem Pasha Hrvat asked in Croatian if Zay and Vrančić spoke Croatian. The interpreter was then dismissed and they proceeded in Croatian during the entire process of negotiations.

In 1585, a traveler and writer Marco A. Pigaffetta, in his Itinerario published in London, states: In Constantinople it is customary to speak Croatian, a language which is understood by almost all official Turks, especially military men. Crucially though, the lingua franca at the time among Slavic elites in the Ottoman Empire was still Old Church Slavonic. For Italians traveling through to Istanbul, the language of the Slavic Croats was often the only exposure they had to any of the Slavic languages; indeed, Bulgarian and Macedonian dialects were far more common in Istanbul than Croatian.

=== Muslims and Croat nationalism ===
One of the major ideological influences of the Croatian nationalism of the Croatian fascist movement Ustaše was 19th century Croatian activist Ante Starčević. Starčević was an advocate of Croatian unity and independence and was both anti-Habsburg and anti-Serbian. The Ustaše used Starčević's theories to promote the annexation of Bosnia and Herzegovina to Croatia and recognized Croatia as having two major ethnocultural components: Catholic Croats and Muslim Croats.

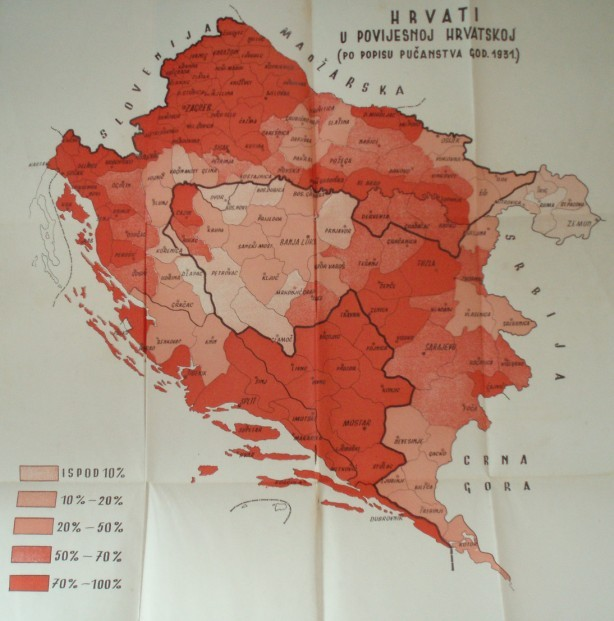
This 1939 map printed by Mladen Lorković in the Banovina of Croatia presents the results of the 1931 census such that all Catholic Croats as well as Muslims are identified as simply "Croats".

The Ustaše recognized both Roman Catholicism and Islam as the national religions of the Croatian people while rejecting Orthodox Christianity as incompatible with their objectives (with the exception of the Croatian Orthodox Church intended mainly to assimilate the Serb minority). Though the Ustaše emphasized religious themes, it stressed that duty to the nation took precedence over religious custom. They attached conditions to citizenship of people of Islamic faith, such as asserting that a Muslim who supported Yugoslavia would not be considered a Croat, nor a citizen but a "Muslim Serb" who could be denied property and imprisoned. The Ustase claimed that such "Muslim Serbs" had to earn Croat status. The Ustaše also saw the Bosnian Muslims as "the flower of the Croatian nation".

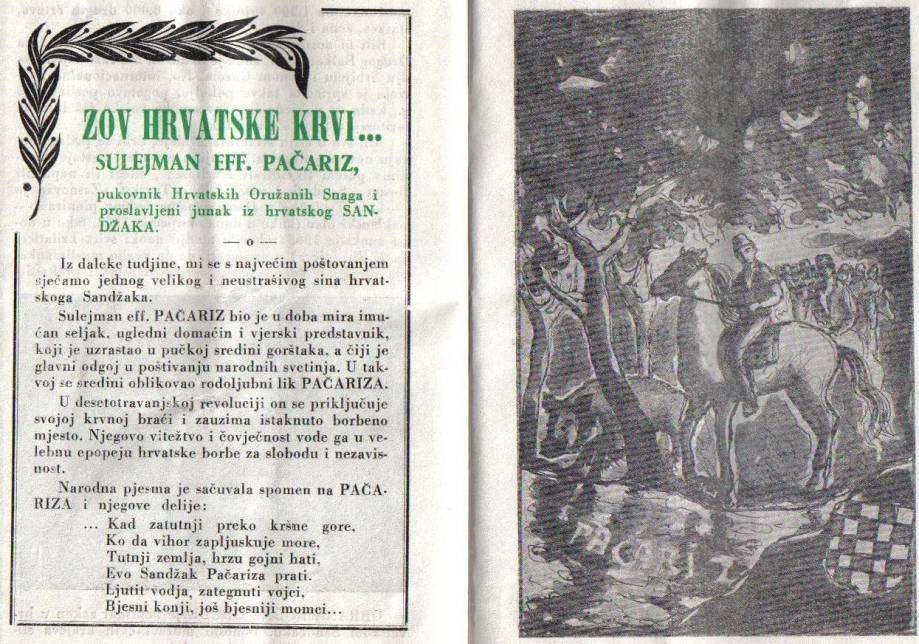
A propaganda tribute (shout of the Croatian blood) to the Islamic cleric and the commander of the Muslim Militia from Sandžak, Sulejman Pačariz. Published by the "Osvit" magazine during the WWII.

Džafer-beg Kulenović was a Muslim who later became the vice-president of the Independent State of Croatia (NDH) on 8 November 1941 and held the position until the war's end. He had actually succeeded his older brother Osman Kulenović in this position. Kulenović later immigrated to Syria. He lived there until his death on 3 October 1956 in Damascus. While in Syria, the Croats in Argentina published a collection of his journalistic writings. In 1950, the Croat Muslim Community in Chicago published a speech he wrote for the Muslim Congress following World War II in Lahore, Pakistan. This twenty-two page pamphlet entitled "A Message of Croat Muslims to Their Religious Brethren in the World" detailed Serb aggression against Croats of Islamic faith and promoted the idea of Croat unity. The pamphlet however failed to attract much attention in the Islamic world.

Only a few months before his death, the Croatian Liberation Movement was formed, with Dr. Kulenović being one of the founders and signatories.

== Statistics ==
The published data from the 2011 Croatian census included a crosstab of ethnicity and religion which showed that, out of a total of 62,977 Muslims (1.47% of the total population), 9,647 declared themselves as ethnic Croats.

Croat Muslims by census
Year	Croatia	Bosnia and Herzegovina	Serbia and other countries
1948	3,212	25,295	564
1953	4,057	15,477	N/A
1991	4,254	N/A	N/A
2001	6,848	–	–
2011	9,647	–	–
2013	–	1,429	–
2021	10,841	–	–
2022	–	–	7

=== Religion ===
Most Croat Muslims, like other Muslim communities (Albanians, ethnic Muslims, Muslim Roma, etc.), are Sunni Muslim; historically, Sufism has also played a significant role among all South Slavic Muslims. The Mufti of Zagreb is imam Aziz Hasanović, the leader of the Muslim community of Croatia. A new mosque in Rijeka was opened in May 2013. The Muslim community is also planning to build a mosque in Osijek and Sisak. A mosque in Karlovac is also being considered.

== Gallery ==
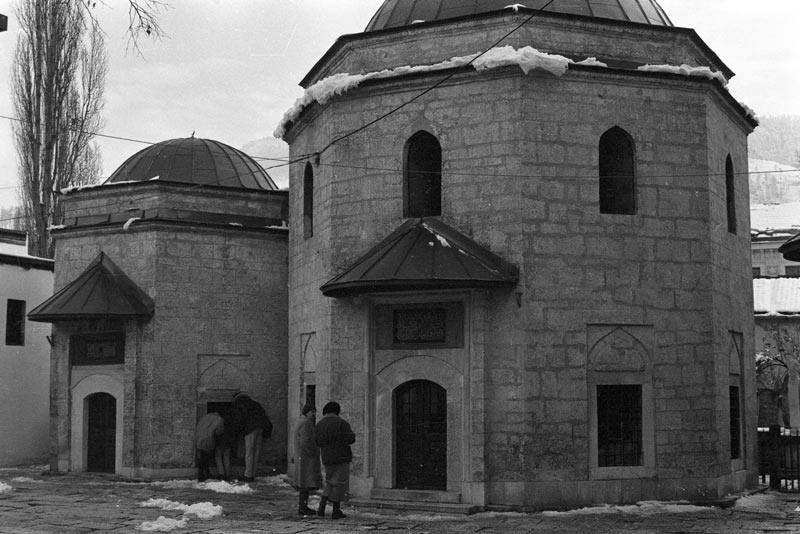
The türbe of the Croatian Ottoman general Murat-beg Tardić next to the mausoleum of Gazi Husrev-beg in Sarajevo.

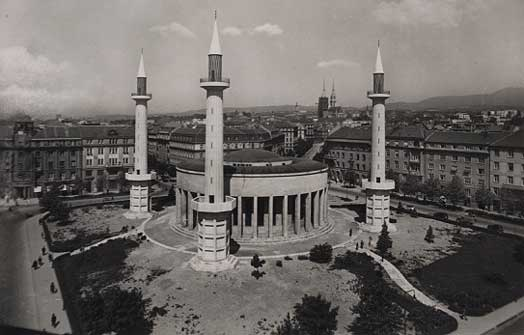
Mosque, built as a museum in 1938 and adapted in 1941 for the Zagreb Muslims by the Croatian fascist leader and politician who led the Ustaše movement Ante Pavelić, today Meštrović Pavilion, Square of Victims of Fascism.

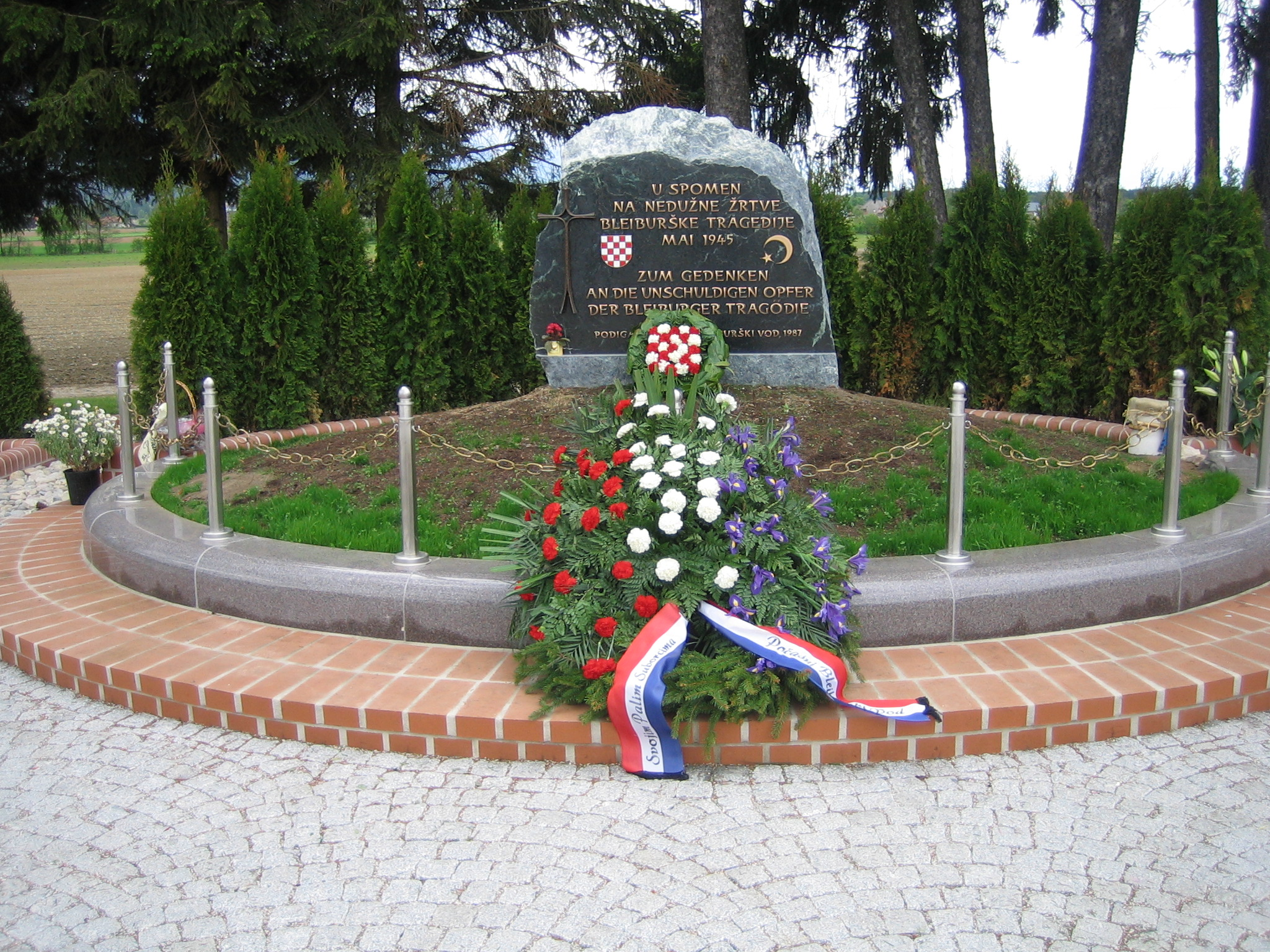
Memorial in Bleiburg, Austria, to massacred Croat Catholics and Croat Muslims during the Bleiburg repatriations and a large number of civilians.

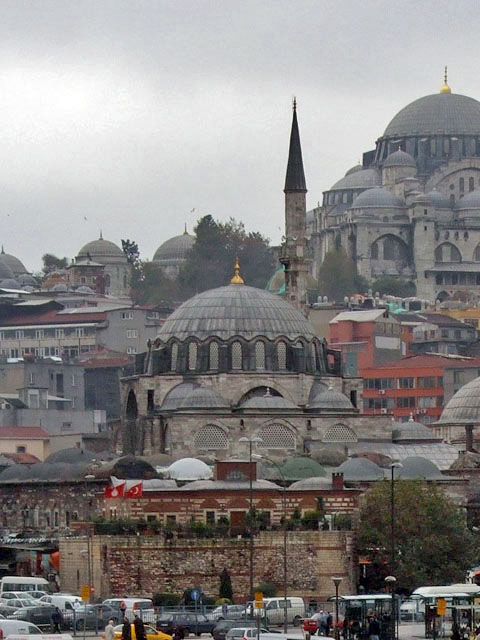
The Rüstem Pasha Mosque (center), overlooked by the Süleymaniye Mosque (upper right) dedicated to Suleiman the Magnificent.

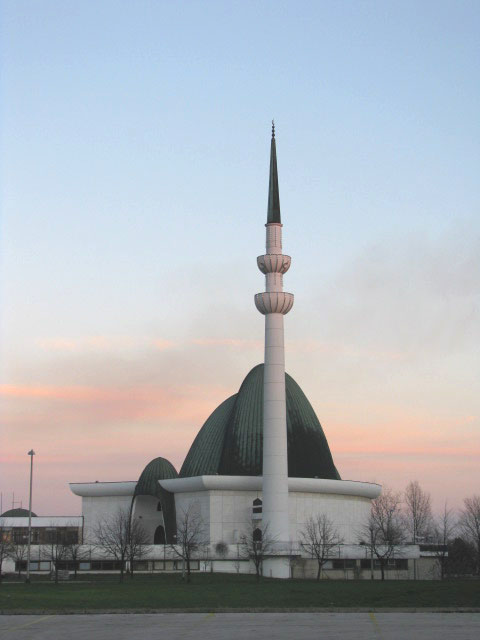
Mosque in the Croatian capital city Zagreb.

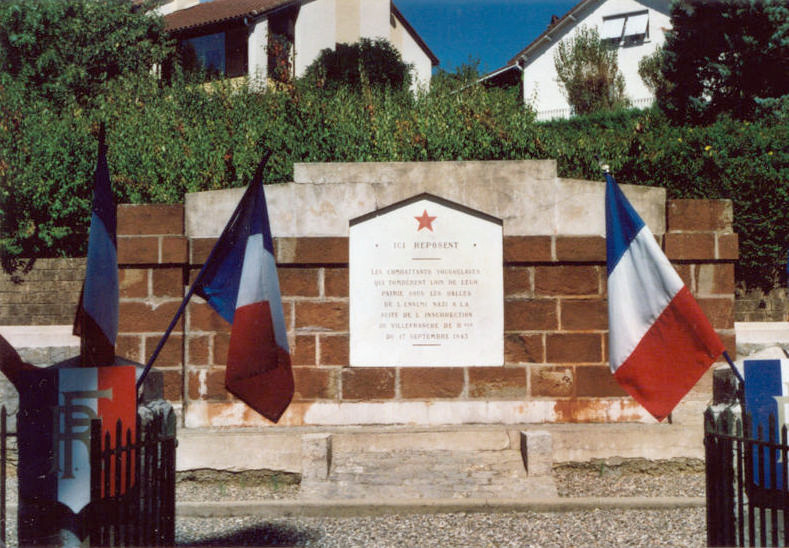
The memorial to the pro-Partisan members of the Handschar Waffen-SS in Villefranche-de-Rouergue. The locals decided to naming one of its streets Avenue des Croates and commemorating "the revolt of the Croats".

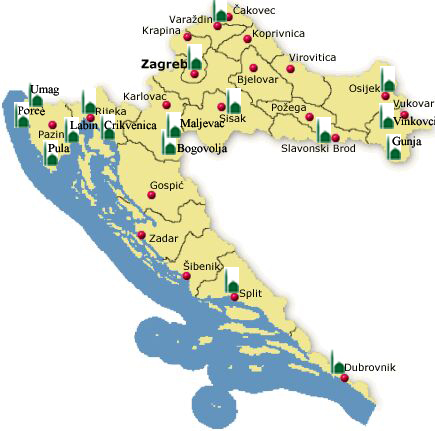
Places of worship for Muslims located in Croatia.

== Sources ==
- Ramet, Sabrina P. (2006). The Three Yugoslavias: State-Building and Legitimation, 1918–2005. Bloomington: Indiana University Press. ISBN 978-0-253-34656-8.
- Fischer, Bernd J., ed. (2007). Balkan Strongmen: Dictators and Authoritarian Rulers of South-Eastern Europe. Purdue University Press. ISBN 978-1-55753-455-2.
- Dizdar, Zdravko; Grčić, Marko; Ravlić, Slaven; Stuparić, Darko (1997). Tko je tko u NDH: Hrvatska 1941–1945 (in Croatian). Zagreb: Minerva. ISBN 978-953-6377-03-9.
- Ethnicity/National Affiliation, Religion and Mother Tongue (PDF). Sarajevo: Agency for Statistics of Bosnia and Herzegovina. 2019.
