= Nahid Kulenović =

Croatian politician (1929–1969)

- Born: 5 July 1929; Brčko, Kingdom of Yugoslavia
- Died: 30 June 1969 (aged 39); Munich, West Germany
- Cause of death: Assassinated by Yugoslav intelligence
- Occupations: Politician, newspaper columnist, editor and activist
- Spouse: Marijana Deželić
- Father: Džafer Kulenović
- Relatives: Osman Kulenović (uncle)

Nahid Kulenović (5 July 1929 – 30 June 1969) was an emigree Croatian newspaper columnist, editor (Hrvatska sloboda, Hrvatska straža) and activist, president of the German branch of Croatian Liberation Movement (HOP). He was the son of Džafer Kulenović, a highly ranked official of the Independent State of Croatia, and Zumra née Salihbegović. Kulenović was married to Marijana, daughter of a Croatian activist, Berislav Đuro Deželić.

Kulenović was assassinated, reportedly by the Yugoslav Secret Police (UDBA), in his Munich apartment in June 1969.
