= Ostrvica =

Ostrvica may refer to:

- Ostrvica or Ostrovica, a peak of Rudnik (mountain) in Serbia
- Ostrvica (castle) or Ostrovica, the fortified town on Ostrovica peak of Rudnik mountain in Serbia
- Ostrvica, Split-Dalmatia County, a village near Omiš, Croatia
- Ostrvica, Lika-Senj County, a village near Gospić, Croatia
- Ostrvica, Kosovo, a mountain in Kosovo

== See also ==
- Ostrovica
