= Ostrovica, Bosnia and Herzegovina =

Ostrovica Островица
- Village
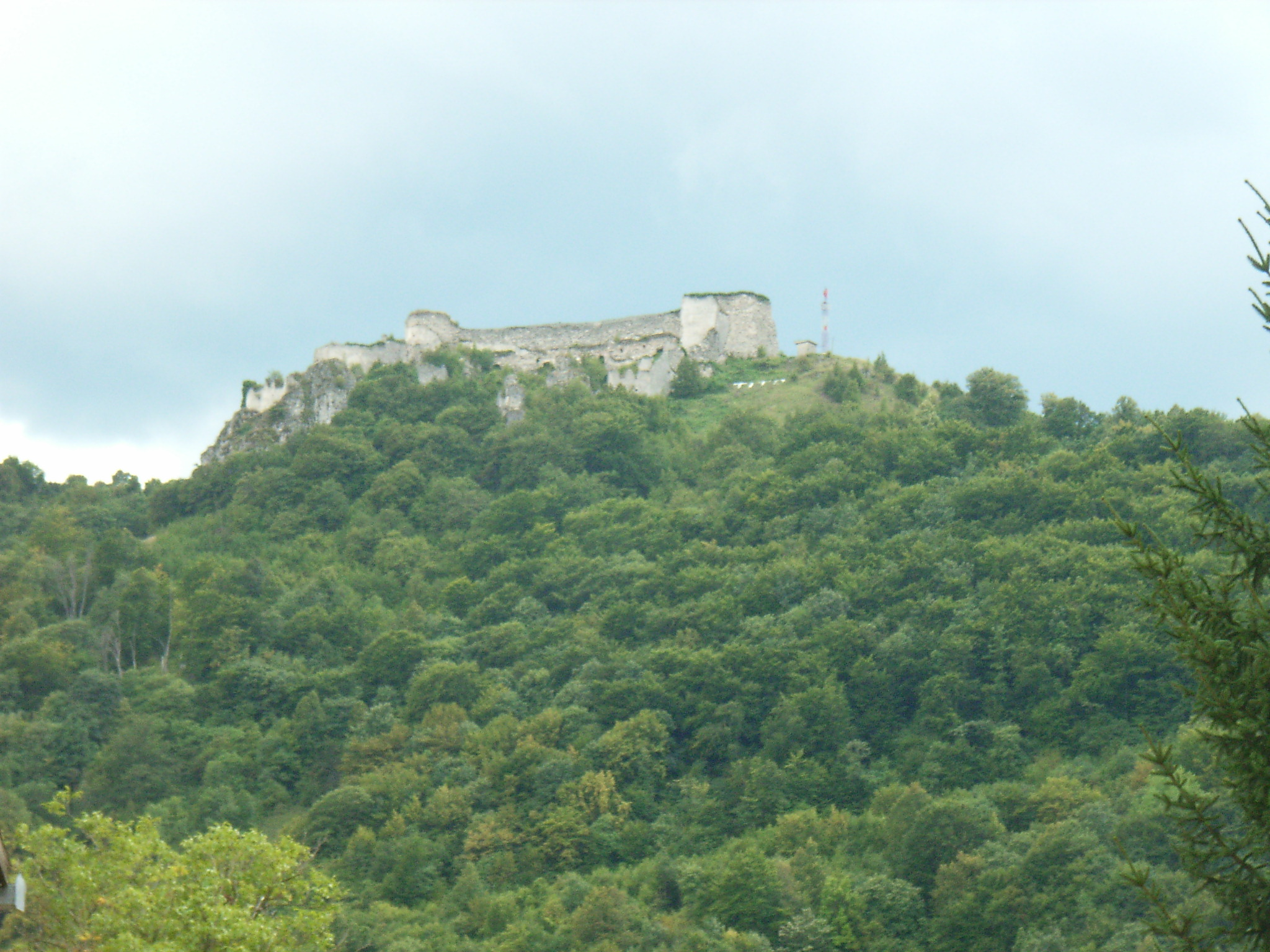

- Location within Bosnia and Herzegovina
- Coordinates: 44°34′N 16°04′E
- Country: Bosnia and Herzegovina
- Entity: Federation of Bosnia and Herzegovina
- Canton: Una-Sana
- Municipality: Bihać

Area
  - Total: 1.99 sq mi (5.15 km^{2})

Population (2013)
  - Total: 11
  - Density: 5.5/sq mi (2.1/km^{2})
- Time zone: UTC+1 (CET)
  - Summer (DST): UTC+2 (CEST)

Ostrovica (Serbian Cyrillic: Островица) is a village named after a small river (tributary of the Una) in the Una-Sana Canton of Bosnia and Herzegovina, located on a hill near the town of Kulen Vakuf.

In the Middle Ages, Ostrovica was a fort.

== Demographics ==
According to the 2013 census, its population was 11, all Bosniaks.
