= Croatian Liberation Movement =

Croatian Liberation Movement Hrvatski oslobodilački pokret
- President: Andrej Šebalj
- Founder: Ante Pavelić
- Founded: 8 June 1956
- Registered: 9 October 1991
- Preceded by: Ustaše
- Headquarters: Zagreb, Croatia
- Membership (2010): 650
- Ideology: Croatian socialism Croatian nationalism Anti-communism; Euroscepticism; Neo-fascism
- Political position: Far-right
- Religion: Roman Catholicism; Cult of the leader

Party flag

The Croatian Liberation Movement (Croatian: Hrvatski oslobodilački pokret, HOP; Spanish: Movimiento de Liberación Croata) is a minor political party founded in 1956 in Buenos Aires, Argentina, by Ante Pavelić, poglavnik of the Independent State of Croatia and its ruling party Ustaše from 1941 to 1945, and some Croatian emigrants.

== History ==
Until the 1970s, HOP was a Croatian emigrant organization with more than 80 percent of its members made up of people who had been politically active in some way in the 1941–1945 Independent State of Croatia regime. Originally led by Ante Pavelić, the former poglavnik, other signatories of HOP's first foundation charter included former Independent State of Croatia government officials such as Džafer Kulenović and Vjekoslav Vrančić, which caused it to be considered a successor of the Ustaše, the Croatian fascist movement which ran the Independent State of Croatia.

The stated goal of the organization was the re-establishment of the Independent State of Croatia in its World War II borders, encompassing most of the territory of present-day Croatia and Bosnia and Herzegovina, which was at the time of HOP's foundation part of SFR Yugoslavia. Although considered by outsiders to be the most radical Croatian nationalist organization, HOP officially described itself as an anti-communist organization committed to democratic political means.

After the collapse of communism in Yugoslavia in the early 1990s, the organization's headquarters were moved from Buenos Aires to Zagreb and it was officially registered as a political party in Croatia in October 1991.

Following registration, HOP ran in the August 1992 parliamentary election with little success. It has remained a marginal political force ever since. Their only other election campaign came fifteen years later for the 2007 election, in which they also fared poorly.

Today, HOP functions as a minor political party in Croatia without holding any seats in the Croatian Parliament or at any other government level. The organization has active branches in Canada (in Toronto, Winnipeg, and Vancouver), and Australia (in Melbourne and Sydney).
