= Džafer Kulenović =

Bosniak politician (1891–1956)

Beg Džafer Kulenović
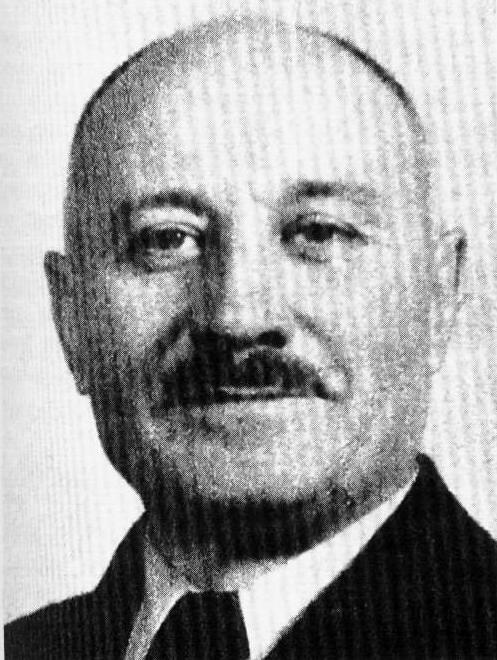

2nd Vice President of the Government of the Independent State of Croatia
- In office 7 November 1941 – 8 May 1945
- Prime Minister: Ante Pavelić (1941–1943); Nikola Mandić (1943–1945)
- Leader: Ante Pavelić
- Preceded by: Osman Kulenović
- Succeeded by: Office abolished

Minister of Forestry and Mining
- In office 26 August 1939 – 6 April 1941
- Prime Minister: Dragiša Cvetković (until 1941) Dušan Simović
- Preceded by: Ljubomir Pantić
- Succeeded by: Office abolished

Minister Without Portfolio
- In office 5 February 1939 – 26 August 1939
- Prime Minister: Dragiša Cvetković

3rd President of the Yugoslav Muslim Organization
- In office 29 June 1939 – 10 April 1941
- Preceded by: Mehmed Spaho
- Succeeded by: Office abolished

Member of Senate
- In office 6 January 1929 – 5 February 1939
- Prime Minister: See list: Petar Živković (1929–32); Vojislav Marinović (1932); Milan Srškić (1932–34); Nikola Uzunović (1934); Bogoljub Jevtić (1934–35); Milan Stojadinović

Member of the National Assembly
- In office December 1920 – 6 January 1929
- Prime Minister: See list: Milenko Vesnić (1920–21); Nikola Pašić (1921–24); Ljubomir Davidović (1924); Nikola Pašić (1924–26); Nikola Uzunović (1926–27); Velimir Vukićević (1927–28); Anton Korošec

Personal details
- Born: 17 February 1891 Kulen Vakuf, Bosnia and Herzegovina, Austria-Hungary
- Died: 3 October 1956 (aged 65) Damascus, Syria
- Party: Croatian Liberation Movement
- Other political affiliations: Yugoslav Muslim Organization
- Relations: Osman Kulenović (brother) Nahid Kulenović (son)
- Education: University of Vienna
- Profession: Lawyer

Džafer Kulenović (17 February 1891 – 3 October 1956), often referred to as Džafer-beg Kulenović, was a Croatian Muslim and Yugoslav politician who led the Yugoslav Muslim Organization in the Kingdom of Yugoslavia, and was briefly Minister of Forestry and Mining in the pre-war Yugoslav governments of Dragiša Cvetković and Dušan Simović. During World War II, he served as the Vice President of the Axis puppet state the Independent State of Croatia.

== Early life ==
Džafer beg Kulenović was born to a prominent Croat Muslim family in the village Kulen Vakuf near Bihać, Bosnia and Herzegovina, Austria-Hungary. His family settled there in the 17th century from around the town of Udbina in the Croatian region of Lika.

Kulenović was the son of Muhamed and his wife Meleća. He had an older brother, Osman (1889–1947), a politician and lawyer. Kulenović attended gymnasium in Sarajevo and Tuzla, and he was expelled from school in 1905 just two months before graduation due to a clash with Serbian students; because of that, he transferred to school in Mostar and graduated there in 1909. In the same year, he entered the University of Vienna, but because of health issues, he went to Faculty of Law, University of Zagreb from which he graduated. Kulenović was active in Vienna's Party of Rights' youth organisation of pro-Croat Muslims, Svijest ("Awareness", "Consciousness"), and was elected its president.

He was married to Zumra, a member of the Bosnian Muslim noble family, the Salihbegovićs, from Bijeljina.

== Kingdom of Yugoslavia ==
In 1919, after the Kingdom of Yugoslavia was established, Kulenović joined the Yugoslav Muslim Organization, a political party of Muslims from Bosnia. For every election held in Yugoslavia, he was elected to the National Assembly as a representative of the Brčko municipality. When the Vidovdan Constitution was voted on, his party ordered its members in the National Assembly to support the new constitution; however, Kulenović boycotted the voting as he was against the Constitution and thus did not violate his party's orders. When his party divided into the Centralist (pro-Serb) and the pro-Autonomy list, Kulenović supported the pro-Autonomy and pro-Croatian line.

In the 1923 election, the Autonomists defeated the pro-Serbian faction. Kulenović was also among those who made the Sarajevan Punctations, in which the YMO condemned the Serbian nationalist policy over Bosnia and Herzegovina and demanded Bosnian autonomy. After Mehmed Spaho, the President of the YMO, died, Kulenović was elected as the organization's new president on 29 June 1939. Uzeir Hadžihasanović who was influential amongst the Muslims, helped him win this post. At this time, the YMO was in a coalition called the Yugoslav Radical Union (YRU); the coalition was led by Milan Stojadinović. The YMO's membership in the YRU threatened YMO's existence, and Kulenović tried to save the party. His actions led to the division in the YRU.

During the crisis of the YRU, Kulenović stated to the press: Gentlemen, I am a Croat and a Croatian nationalist... And not only that I am a Croat and a Croatian nationalist, but the Bosnian Muslims are, as a whole, Croats and part of the Croatian nation.

— Džafer Kulenović

During the tenures of prime ministers Dragiša Cvetković and Dušan Simović, Kulenović was a minister without portfolio and Minister of Forestry and Mining. In 1939 Kulenović opposed the partition of Bosnia and Herzegovina when the Banovina of Croatia was created, and he also opposed the idea of Serbian nationalist ministers and politicians that the parts of Bosnia and Herzegovina, which were not included in the Croatian Banovina, should be included in Serbian lands. During the German Invasion of Yugoslavia in April 1941, Kulenović did not leave the country as most ministers did; he secretly left Belgrade and went to Užice, from where he went to Sarajevo and later to Brčko, where his family lived.

== Independent State of Croatia ==
He became the Deputy Prime Minister of the Independent State of Croatia (NDH) in November 1941 and held the position until the end of the war. He had succeeded his older brother Osman Kulenović in this position. At the end of the war he took part in the Independent State of Croatia evacuation to Austria. He was apprehended by British forces and sent to their detention centre at Spittal an der Drau on 17 May. He arrived one day after a group of NDH government officials had been sent back to Yugoslavia. In September he escaped from a military hospital in Villach.

== Emigration ==
Kulenović lived in Italy until 1948, then immigrated with his family to Syria. He lived there until his death on 3 October 1956 in Damascus. While in Syria, the expatriate Croat community in Argentina published a collection of his journalistic writings. In 1950, the Bosnian Muslim Community in Chicago published a speech he wrote for the Muslim Congress following World War II in Lahore, Pakistan.

A few months before Kulenović's death, the Croatian Liberation Movement was formed, with Kulenović as a founder and signatory. His son, Nahid continued working with this Movement, but was assassinated by the UDBA in Munich in 1969.

== Works ==
- A Message from Croat Moslems to their Religious Brethren in the World, 1951., (reprint, Createspace, 2011.)
- Džafer Kulenović, Sabrana djela, 1945.-1956., Buenos Aires, 1978. (editors: Jere Jareb, Stjepan Barbarić, Miron Krešimir Begić, Ragib Zukić)
- Izbor iz djela: članci i rasprave, Uzdanica, Zagreb, 1992.
