= Croatian socialism =

Fascist movement during World War II

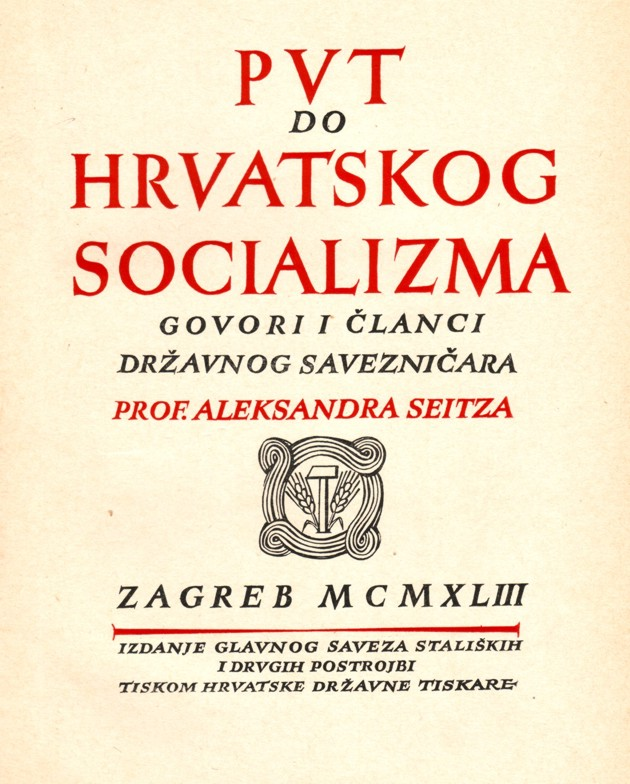
Book cover of Path to Croatian Socialism by Aleksandar Seitz, 1943

Croatian socialism (Croatian: Hrvatski socializam (Note: Etymological spelling of the word 'socijalizam' according to language laws of the Independent State of Croatia; for further information, see Croatian linguistic purism.)) was the social-economic ideology adopted by the Ustaše movement in the Independent State of Croatia during World War II. The Pavelić regime produced extensive literature regarding the economic and political organisation that the new Croatian state would follow, ultimately deciding to adopt a purely Croatian type of socialism, strongly inspired by Nazism, that would be based on class collaboration and ethnic nationalism for the common benefit of the Croats.

It was decided that Croatian socialism would be the appropriate model that suited the Croatian people, which was characterized by its community, solidarity, cooperative spirit, and worker-peasant structure. Croatian socialism was expanded upon in the works of philosophers Stjepan Zimmermann and Čedomil Veljačić, sociologist and ethnologist Mirko Kus Nikolajev, and syndicalist Aleksandar Seitz.
