= Ostrovica Castle =

Medieval castle in Ostrovica, Bosnia

- Ostrovica, Bosnia and Herzegovina; Near Kulen Vakuf in Bosnia and Herzegovina
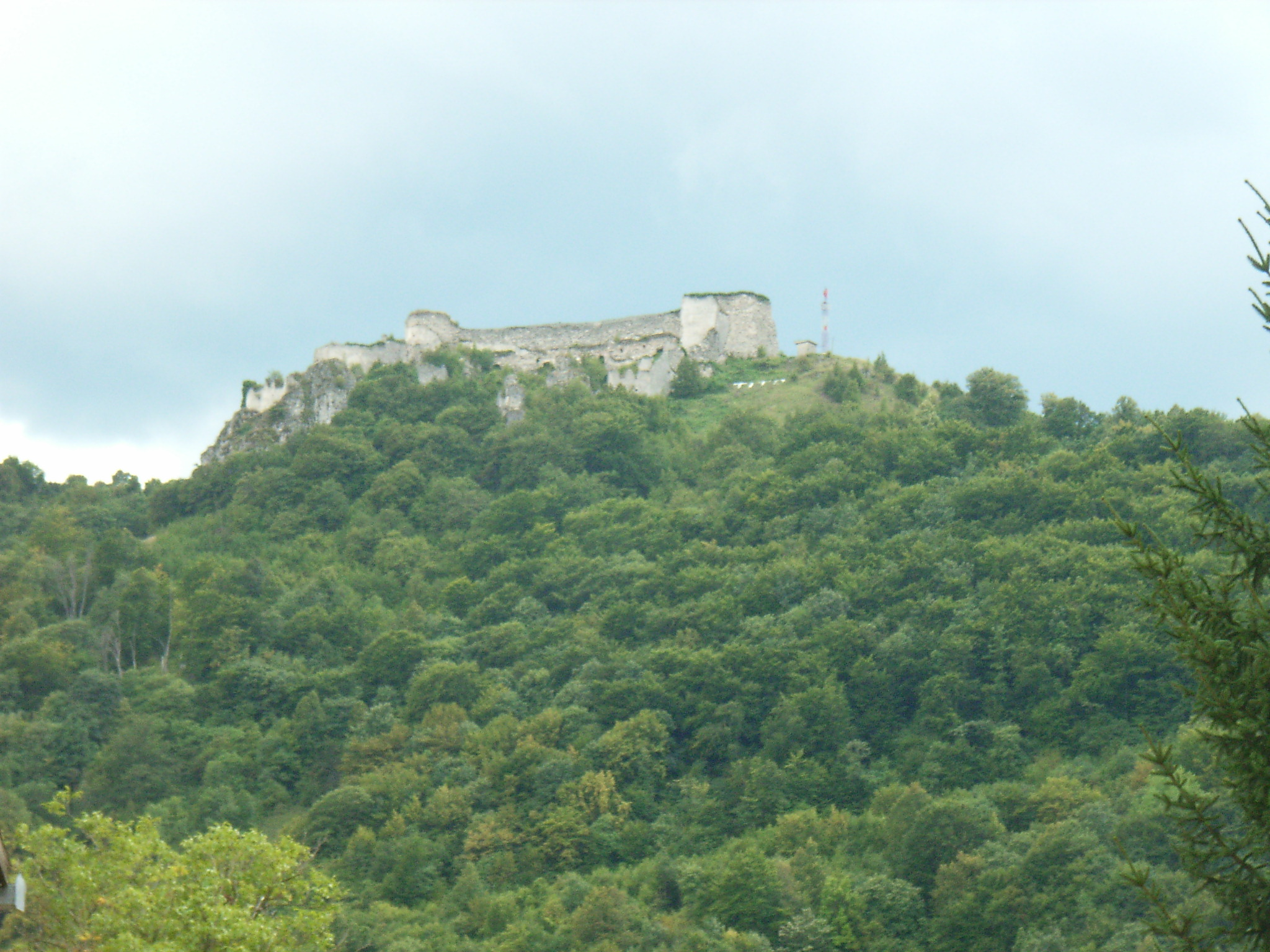
- Ostrovica Castle

Site information
- Type: Hilltop castle
- Controlled by: Hranić-Kosača, Disislavić noble family, Kurjaković noble family (later renamed Karlović), Juraj Mikulčić, Ivan Keglević, Frankopan noble family, Kulenović noble family
- Condition: damaged, partially renovated

Location
- Coordinates: 44.558°N 16.081°E

Site history
- Built: 15th century
- Built by: (unknown)
- Materials: hewn stone (ashlar)

Garrison information
- Designations

KONS of Bosnia and Herzegovina
- Official name: Ostrovica – Ostrovački fort, the historic site
- Type: Category II monument
- Criteria: A, B, D i., E iii., F ii.iii., G v., I iii.
- Designated: 4 June 2012 (?th session No. 05.1-2.3-73/12-15)
- Part of: Una National Park
- Reference no.: 3387
- State: National Monuments of Bosnia and Herzegovina
- Site is protected as National Monument of Bosnia and Herzegovina by the Government of BiH and its KONS

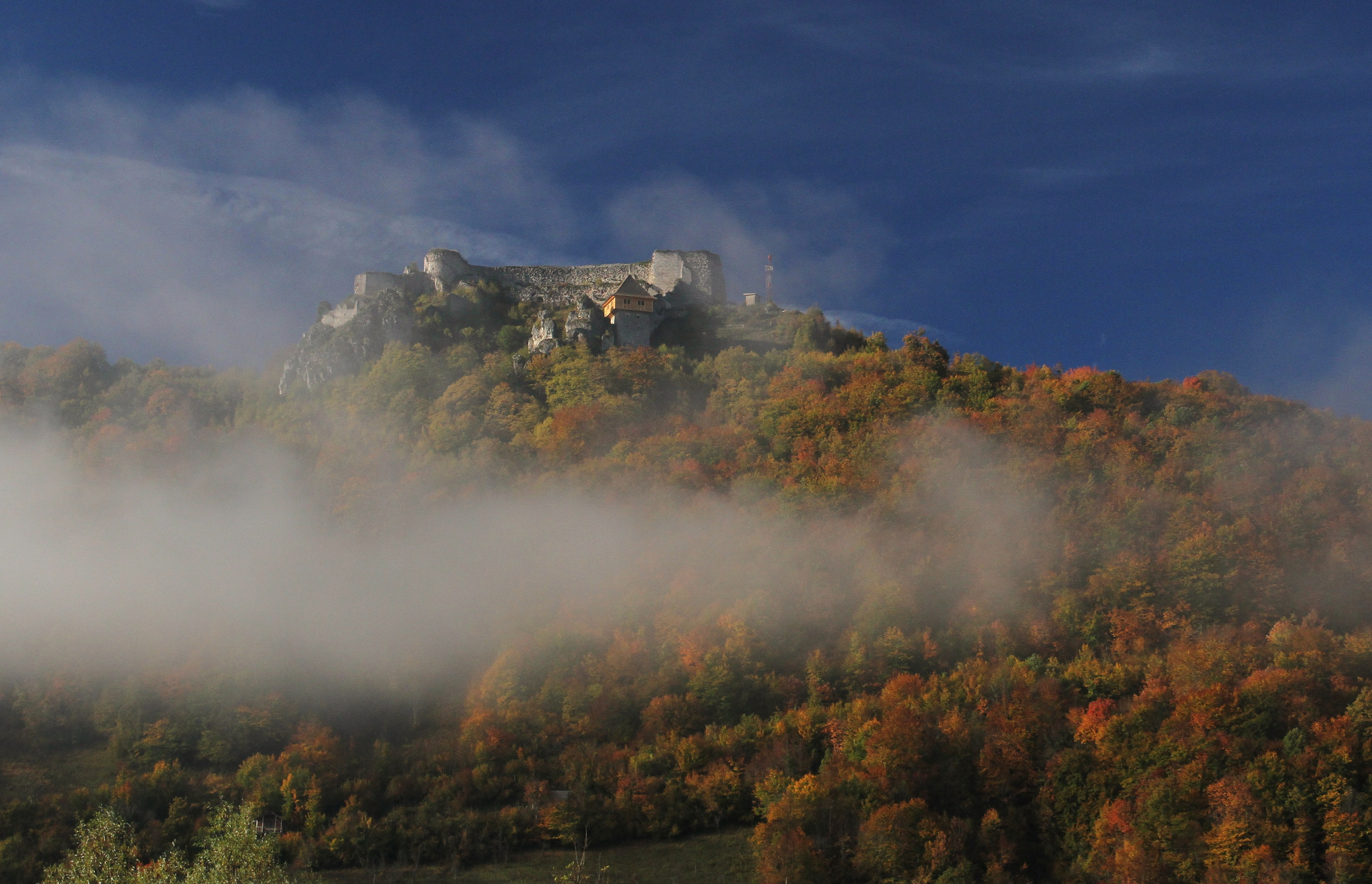
Ostrovica Castle on a foggy autumn day in 2013

The Ostrovica Castle (Bosnian: Stari grad Ostrovica, Ottoman Turkish: Ostroviçe kalesi) is a large medieval structure situated above the small village of Ostrovica near Kulen Vakuf, Bihać municipality, Bosnia and Herzegovina. Having been built on a heavily wooded ridge of a steep hill overlooking left bank of the shallow Una river, the castle was located on a strategic site connecting the northern and southern parts of the long Una valley.

The modern-day castle was most probably built during the 15th century on the foundations of ancient fortification which dates back to ancient Roman times or even earlier. In the Middle Ages, Ostrovica belonged to the Kingdom of Croatia and its Lapac County.

The first mention of the castle was in a charter from 1407, in which King Ladislaus of Naples, confirmed possession over Ostrovica to a Bosnian magnate and Grand Duke, Sandalj Hranić, who most likely rebuilt the fortress at the beginning of 15th century on a foundations of an ancient fortification, which dates back to ancient Roman times or even earlier. In 1523 it was conquered by the Ottomans.

== History ==
The first mention of the castle was in a charter from 1407, in which King Ladislaus of Naples, confirmed possession over Ostrovica and Skradin to a Bosnian magnate and Grand Duke, Sandalj Hranić, who received it as a dowry for his second marriage, this time to a niece of Hrvoje Vukčić Hrvatinić, daughter of Vuk Vukčić Hrvatinić, Katarina Vuković in May 1405. When Ladislaus started giving up of his reign over Dalmatia between 1409 and 1410 and selling possessions there to Venice, Sandalj, following in Ladislaus footsteps, sold both Skradin and Ostrovica also to Venice for 5000 ducats in 1409/1410. He also divorced Katarina in 1411. Most likely it was Sandalj who rebuilt the fortress at the beginning of 15th century on the foundations of ancient fortification which dates back to ancient Roman times or even earlier.

Later in the 15th century the castle was possessed by the Kurjaković family, (later renamed Karlović), known as Princes of Krbava (Croatian: Knezovi Krbavski), who came out from one of chieftain cadet branches of the old Croatian tribe of Gusić. After them, proprietors of the castle were also Juraj Mikulčić (who died in 1495), Ivan Keglević, and members of House of Frankopan, among others.

The Ottoman threatened Ostrovica since the fall of the medieval Kingdom of Bosnia in 1463. Still, it resisted until December 1523, when the castle and surrounding area came under Ottoman control.

The long period of Ottoman rule lasted until 1878. In that period the castle was enlarged and reinforced, serving as an Ottoman military stronghold. Military units situated there were commanded first by dizdar (16th and 17th century) and then (from the beginning of the 18th century) by a captain. A significant enlargement of the castle occurred during the reign of sultan Ahmed I at the beginning of the 17th century. The present-day look of the castle was finally given at the beginning of the 18th century. It measures 117 meters long and 83 meters wide. The main entrance is situated on the south side, while the auxiliary one is put at the north side of the fortification. During the Ottoman period Ostrovica was the seat of Kapetanija Stara Ostrovica (Old Ostrovica captaincy), also comprising smaller strongholds like Orašac, Havala, Džisri-kebir (modern-day Kulen Vakuf), Čovka and Donji Lapac. Long-term captains were members of the Kulenović noble family (titled begs), one of the most prominent families in Ottoman Bosnia.

After Donji Lapac had been returned to Croatian control (being within Habsburg monarchy), the Ottomans moved the seat of captaincy away from the nearby Croatian-Bosnian frontier to Prkose, a stronghold in the same-named village, situated northeast of Ostrovica. In 1737, the fortress was unsuccessfully besieged by the army of the Habsburg Empire during the Austro-Russian–Turkish War (1735–39). Other sieges are recorded in 1560, 1698, 1737, 1789, and 1834.

Finally, it was abandoned in 1878 after Austria-Hungary took control over Bosnia and Herzegovina territory from the Ottomans. Despite Croat demands, Ostrovica was not returned to the Croatian Kingdom, of which it had been part before the arrival of the Ottomans. Moreover, the whole territory of Turkish Croatia, including Ostrovica, Bihać, Banja Luka and so on, was given to direct Habsburg imperial control, as a part of Bosnia and Herzegovina.

== Protection of cultural-historical heritage ==
It is known that in 1838 castle was still in good shape, as it was kept in that way with regular repairs, notably in 1766, 1777 and 1791. As it was abandoned in 1878, Ostrovica was gradually ruined. Today the castle is protected as National Monument of Bosnia and Herzegovina by the government and its Commission to preserve national monuments of Bosnia and Herzegovina, and with its surroundings is part of Una National Park. The castle is occasionally renovated in the recent years in order to be more attractive to tourists.

== See also ==
- List of fortifications in Bosnia and Herzegovina
- Donji Kraji
- History of Bosnia and Herzegovina
- Kingdom of Croatia (1102–1526)
