= Kulen Vakuf =

Kulen Vakuf Кулен Вакуф
- Village
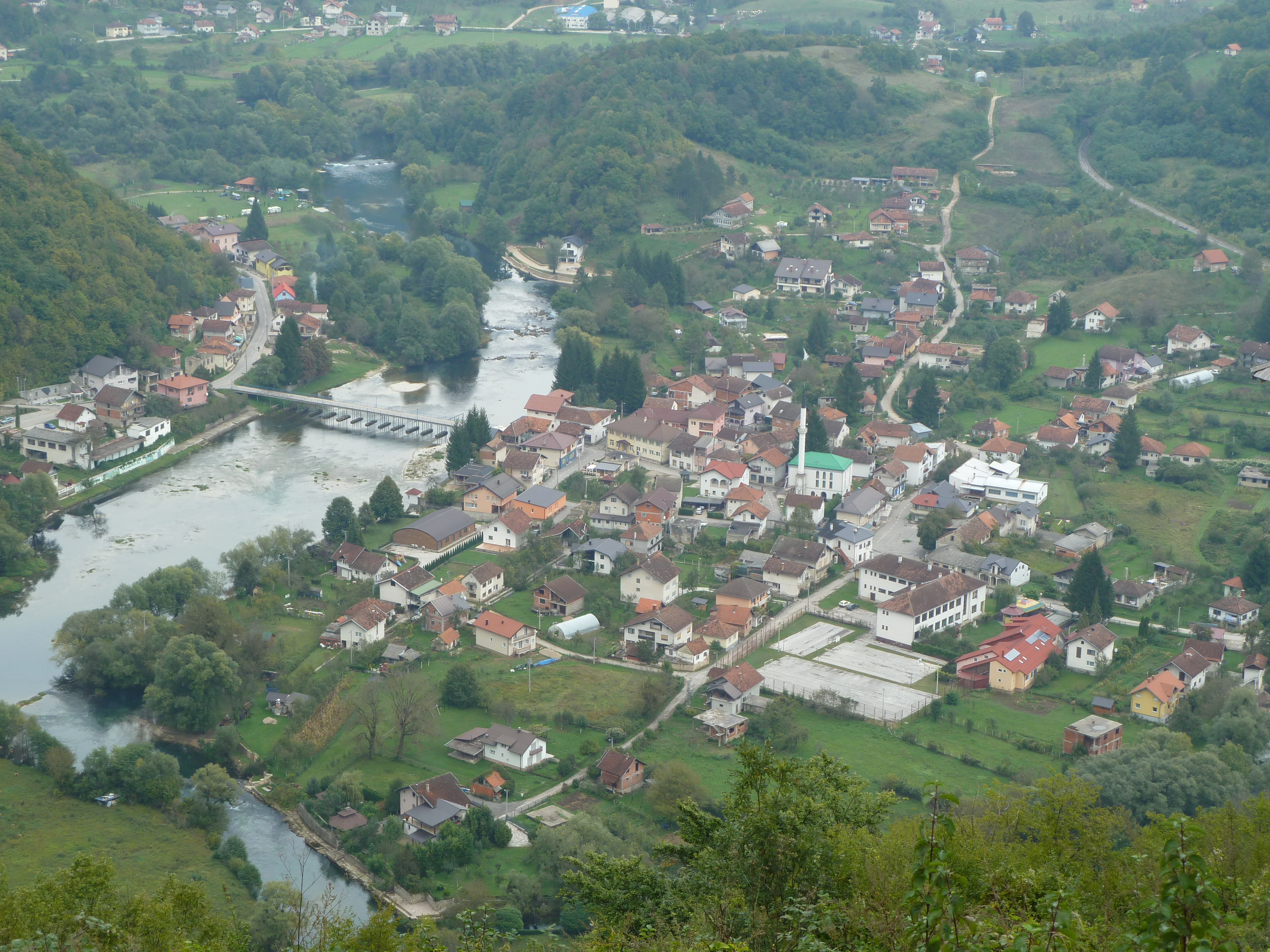
- View of Kulen Vakuf from Ostrovica Castle.

- Location within Bosnia and Herzegovina
- Coordinates: 44°34′N 16°05′E
- Country: Bosnia and Herzegovina
- Entity: Federation of Bosnia and Herzegovina
- Canton: Una-Sana
- Municipality: Bihać

Area
  - Total: 3.82 sq mi (9.90 km^{2})

Population (2013)
  - Total: 457
  - Density: 120/sq mi (46.2/km^{2})
- Time zone: UTC+1 (CET)
  - Summer (DST): UTC+2 (CEST)

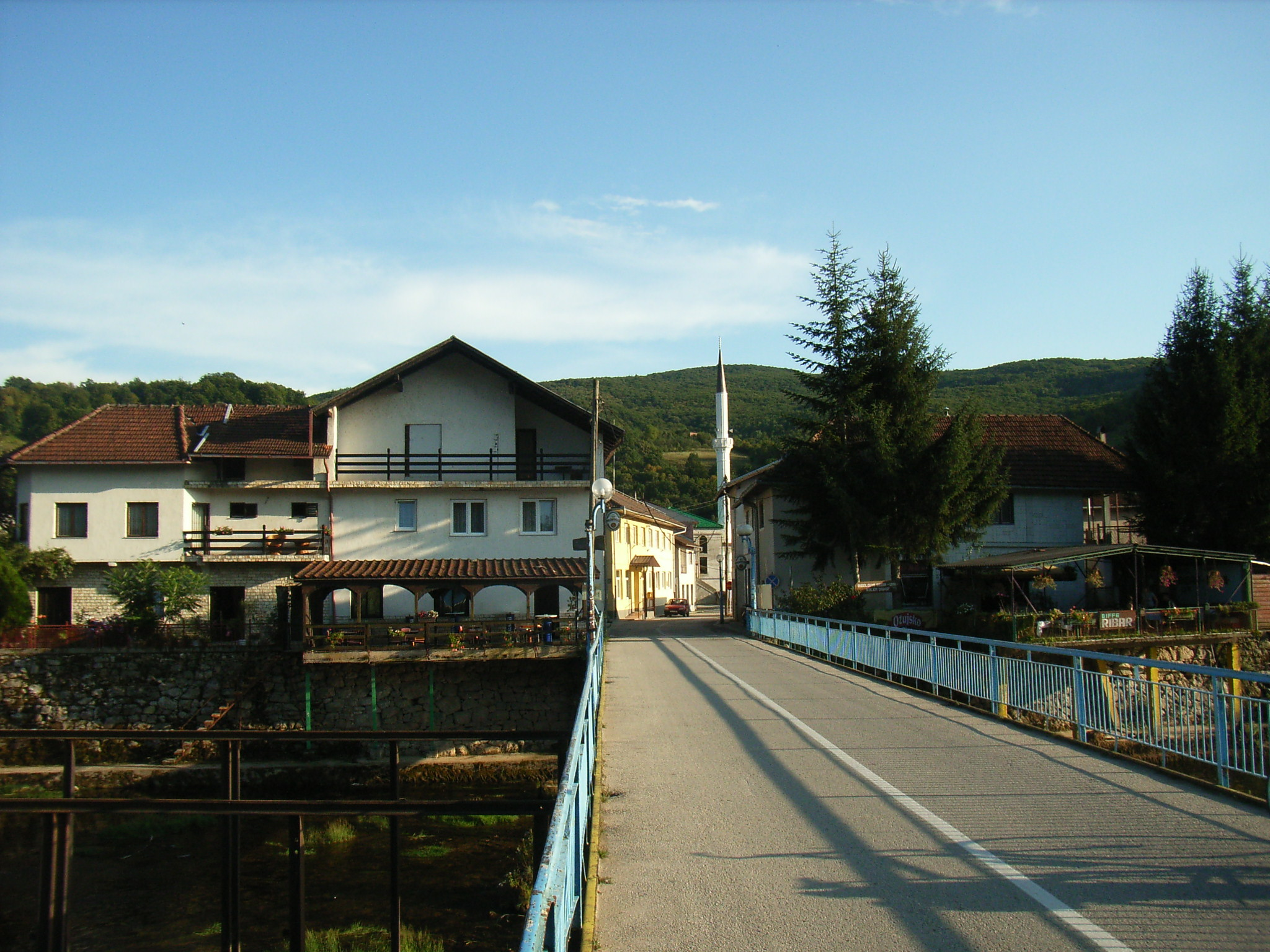
Bridge over Una in Kulen Vakuf.

Kulen Vakuf (Serbian Cyrillic: Кулен Вакуф) is a village in the municipality of Bihać, Bosnia and Herzegovina.

Kulen Vakuf was the birthplace of Bosnian Ottoman nobleman Mehmed-beg Kulenović and Džafer Kulenović, Vice President of the Axis puppet state the Independent State of Croatia.

== Demographics ==
According to the 2013 census, its population was 457.

Ethnicity in 2013
Ethnicity	Number	Percentage
Bosniaks	426	93.2%
Serbs	5	1.1%
Croats	3	0.7%
other/undeclared	23	5.0%
Total	457	100%

== See also ==
- Kulen Vakuf massacre
