= Muslims (ethnic group) =

Ethnoreligious group in former Yugoslavia

Muslimani Муслимани
- Flag used to represent various Muslim minorities in the former Yugoslavia

Total population
- c. 51,000

Regions with significant populations
- Serbia: 13,011 (2022)
- Bosnia and Herzegovina: 12,101 (2013)
- Slovenia: 10,467 (2002)
- Montenegro: 10,162 (2023)
- Croatia: 3,902 (2021)
- North Macedonia: 1,187 (2021)

Languages
- Bosnian, Serbian and Montenegrin

Religion
- Sunni Islam

Related ethnic groups
- Other mainly Muslim South Slavs: (Bosniaks; Croat Muslims; Serb Muslims; Gorani; Torbeši; Pomaks)

Muslims (Serbo-Croatian Latin and Slovene: Muslimani, Serbo-Croatian Cyrillic and Macedonian: Муслимани) are an ethnoreligious group of Serbo-Croatian-speaking Muslims, inhabiting mostly the territory of the former Yugoslavia.

The term Muslims became widely used for the Serbo-Croatian-speaking Muslims in the early 1900s. It gained official recognition in the 1910 census. The 1971 amendment to the Constitution of Yugoslavia also recognised them as a distinct nationality. It grouped several distinct South Slavic communities of Islamic ethnocultural tradition. Before 1993, the vast majority of present-day Bosniaks self-identified as ethnic Muslims, along with smaller groups of other ethnicities, such as the Gorani and the Torbeši. This designation did not include non-Slavic Yugoslav Muslims, such as Albanians, Turks and some Romani people.

After the breakup of Yugoslavia, the majority of the Serbo-Croatian-speaking Muslims of Bosnia and Herzegovina and Serbia adopted the Bosniak ethnic designation. They are today constitutionally recognised as one of three constituent nations of Bosnia and Herzegovina. Approximately 100,000 people across the rest of the former Yugoslavia consider themselves to be Slavic Muslims, mostly in Serbia. They are constitutionally recognized as a distinct ethnic minority in Montenegro.

== History ==
The idea of Muslims as an ethnicity or nationality developed mainly during the Yugoslav socialist period. Beginning in the 1960s, the government officially recognized Muslims by nationality (Muslimani) in census records, distinguishing them from other South Slavic peoples such as Serbs, Croats, and Montenegrins. This classification was part of a broader effort by the Yugoslav authorities to promote ethnic balance and reduce religious divisions by framing identity in secular, national terms rather than strictly religious ones.

The concept was also influenced by earlier perceptions from both Christian and communist leaders who viewed Muslims as a separate cultural group. Many of these populations were seen as moderately observant in their religious practices, reflecting a blend of Islamic, Slavic, and local traditions. Historically, most South Slavic Muslims lived in Bosnia and Herzegovina, the Sandžak region (spanning Serbia and Montenegro), northeastern Montenegro, western and central Macedonia, southern parts of Croatia, and southern Kosovo, including the Gorani communities.

The Ottoman conquests led many autochthonous inhabitants to convert to Islam. However, nationalist ideologies appeared among South Slavs as early as the 19th century, as with the First and Second Serbian Uprising and the Illyrian movement, national identification was a foreign concept to the general population, which primarily identified itself by denomination and province. The emergence of modern nation-states forced the ethnically and religiously diverse Ottoman Empire to modernise, resulting in several reforms. The most significant of these were the Edict of Gülhane of 1839 and Imperial Reform Edict of 1856. These gave non-Muslim subjects of the Empire equal status and strengthened their autonomous Millet communities.

There was a strong rivalry between South Slavic nationalisms. Vuk Karadžić, then the leading representative of Serbian nationalism, considered all speakers of the Štokavian dialect, regardless of religious affiliation, to be Serbs. Josip Juraj Strossmayer, the Croatian Catholic bishop and his People's Party advocated the idea of South Slavic unity. At the same time, Ante Starčević and his Party of Rights sought to restore the Croatian state based on the so-called historical right, considering Bosnian Muslims as Croats. In both Croatian and Serbian national ideology, the territory of the Bosnia vilayet was of great importance because both wanted to incorporate it into their future national states. From their point of view, Bosnian Muslims were Croats or Serbs who converted to Islam. In 1870, Bosnian Muslims comprised 42.5 per cent of the population of the Bosnia Vilayet, while Eastern Orthodox Christians accounted for 41.7 per cent and Catholics for 14.5 per cent. Which national state would get the territory of the Bosnia Vilayet thus depended on who the Bosnian Muslims would favour, the Croats or the Serbs.

In Bosnia and Herzegovina at that time, the population did not identify with national categories, except for a few intellectuals from urban areas who claimed to be Croats or Serbs. The population of Bosnia and Herzegovina primarily identified itself by religion, using the terms "Turci" (for Muslims), "Hrišćani" (Christians), "Grci" (for the Orthodox), and "Kršćani" (Latins, or Catholics). Furthermore, the Bosna vilayet particularly resisted the reforms, culminating in the rebellion of Husein Gradaščević and his ayans in 1831. Reforms were introduced in Bosnia and Herzegovina only after Omer Pasha Latas forcibly returned the province to the sultan's authority in 1850. The reforms marked the loss of the influence of the ulama (the educated clergy), Sharia was no longer used outside of family matters, and a system of public education was introduced, in addition to religious education. The reforms marked the beginning of journalism and the establishment of modern political institutions, and ultimately the establishment of a provincial assembly in 1865, in which non-Muslims also sat.

The revolt of the Bosnian ayans and the attempted formulation of provincial identity in the 1860s are often portrayed as the first signs of a Bosnian national identity. However, a Bosnian national identity beyond confessional borders was rare, and the strong Bosnian identity of individual ayans or Franciscans, as expressed at that time, reflected regional affiliation and a strong religious aspect. Christians identified more with the Croatian or Serbian nation. For Muslims, identity was more closely tied to the defence of local privileges, but it did not call into question their allegiance to the Ottoman Empire. The term "Bosniak" at that time did not have a national meaning but a regional one. When Austria-Hungary occupied Bosnia and Herzegovina in 1878, national identification was still a foreign concept to Bosnian Muslims.

The Austro-Hungarian administration of Béni Kállay promoted the idea of a non-confessional unitary "Bosniak" identity that would encompass all inhabitants (more akin to "Bosnism"), going even as far as prohibiting Bosnian cultural associations from using the terms "Serb" and "Croat" in their names in the 1880s. In 1883, they officially called the vernacular language "Bosnian". The policy placed its hopes mainly with the Catholic community (who were not yet as deeply entrenched in Croat nationalism as the Orthodox were in Serb nationalism) and the Muslim community (which it sought to distance from the Ottoman Empire). In reality, only a small circle of Muslim notables at the time favoured such a unitary nation. The main proponent of the movement was Mehmed Kapetanović. Although it failed, the Bosniak ideology promoted by the Austrian-Hungarian authorities laid the foundation for the modern Bosniak identity. By emphasising the pre-Ottoman past, it created a founding myth, a theory of the massive conversion of medieval Bogumils to Islam upon the Ottoman conquest, offering a historical continuity and reasoning behind their presence in Europe. The Serbo-Croatian Muslims were referred to as "Mohammedans" until the early 1900s, when the term "Muslims" gained wider traction. It gained an official recognition during the 1910 census.

After World War II, in the Socialist Federal Republic of Yugoslavia, the Bosnian Muslims continued to be treated as a religious group instead of an ethnic one. Aleksandar Ranković and other Serb communist members opposed the recognition of Bosniak nationality. Muslim members of the communist party continued in their efforts to get Tito to support their position for recognition. Nevertheless, in a debate that went on during the 1960s, many Bosnian Muslim communist intellectuals argued that the Muslims of Bosnia and Herzegovina are a distinct native Slavic people that should be recognized as a nation. In 1964, the Fourth Congress of the Bosnian branch of the League of Communists of Yugoslavia assured their Bosnian Muslim membership the Bosnian Muslims' right to self-determination will be fulfilled, thus prompting the recognition of Bosnian Muslims as a distinct nation at a meeting of the Bosnian Central Committee in 1968, however not under the Bosniak or Bosnian name, as opted by the Bosnian Muslim communist leadership. As a compromise, the Constitution of Yugoslavia was amended to list "Muslims" in a national sense; recognizing a constitutive nation, but not the Bosniak name. The use of Muslim as an ethnic denomination was criticised early on, especially on account of motives and reasoning, as well as disregard of this aspect of Bosnian nationhood. Following the downfall of Ranković, Tito also changed his view and stated that recognition of Muslims and their national identity should occur. In 1968 the move was protested in the Serbia and by Serb nationalists such as Dobrica Ćosić. The change was opposed by the Macedonian branch of the Yugoslav Communist Party. They viewed Macedonian speaking Muslims as Macedonians and were concerned that statewide recognition of Muslims as a distinct nation could threaten the demographic balance of the Macedonian republic.

Those loyal to Western Bosnia during the Intra-Bosnian Muslim War retained their Muslim designation

During the Intra-Bosnian Muslim War (1993–95) the forces loyal to the Autonomous Province of Western Bosnia retained their Muslim name, while those loyal to the central government of the Republic of Bosnia and Herzegovina adhered to the Bosniak term, adopted during the Bosnian war in 1993.

Sometimes other terms, such as Muslim with capital M were used, that is, "musliman" was a practising Muslim. At the same time "Musliman" was a member of this nation (Serbo-Croatian uses capital letters for names of peoples but small for names of adherents).

The election law of Bosnia and Herzegovina as well as the Constitution of Bosnia and Herzegovina, recognizes the results from 1991 population census as results referring to Bosniaks.

== Population ==
=== Serbia ===
According to the 2022 census, there were 13,011 ethnic Muslims in Serbia, making up 0.2% of the population.

Regarding religion, most ethnic Muslims declared themselves to be Muslims, 12,129 or 93.2% of them. The Eastern Orthodox Christians were second, comprising 196 or 1.5% of the ethnic Muslim population. They were followed by atheists and agnostics, 126 or 1% of the ethnic Muslim population. (Note: There were 121 or 0.9% of atheists and 5 or 0.04% of agnostics.) The rest belonged to other Christian and religious groups, with 523 or 4% of those undeclared or unknown.

Serbian was the mother tongue of 9,803 or 75.34% of ethnic Muslims. Bosnian was the second most-spoken language, with 1,283 speakers, or 9,86% of ethnic Muslim speakers. The third was Albanian, with 870, or 6.69%, of ethnic Muslims speaking the language.

Year	Population	Share
1991	180,027	2.3%
2002	19,503	0.2%
2011	22,301	0.3%
2022	13,011	0.2%

=== Bosnia and Herzegovina ===
According to the 2013 census, there were 12,121 ethnic Muslims in Bosnia and Herzegovina, making up 0.34% of the population. Before the adoption of the Bosniak identity in the late 1990s, 1,902,956 self-identified ethnic Muslims were living in Bosnia and Herzegovina, or 43.5% of the population. In contrast, 1,496 people identified as Muslims-Bosniaks, 1,285 as Bosniaks and 876 as Bosniaks-Muslims, totalling to 3,657 or 0.1% of the total population.

Per the latest 2013 census, regarding religion, most ethnic Muslims declared themselves followers of Islam or Muslims, 11,559 or 95.3% of them. (Note: The census regarded "Islam" and "Muslims" as two separate categories; 9,283 or 76.59% declared themselves to be followers of Islam, while 2,276 or 18.8% declared themselves to be Muslims.) The remaining part mainly were atheists or agnostics, 208 or 1.7% (Note: There were 192 or 1.6% of atheists and 16 or 0.1% of agnostics.) with 205 or 1.7% undeclared or unknown.

Bosnian was the mother tongue of 10,784, or 89%, of ethnic Muslims. Serbo-Croatian was listed as the mother tongue of 550 or 4.5% ethnic Muslims, with 447 or 3.69% opting for Serbian and 65 or 0.5% for Croatian. The majority of those who designated Serbian as their mother tongue, 423 of them, lived in Republika Srpska.

Subdivision	Ethnic Muslims	%	Share of the total ethnic Muslim population
Tuzla Canton	2,839	0.6%	23.4%
Una-Sana Canton	2,371	0.8%	19.5%
Republika Srpska	1,730	0.1%	14.2%
Sarajevo Canton	1,709	0.4%	14.1%
Zenica-Doboj Canton	1,519	0.4%	12.5%
Central Bosnia Canton	1,216	0.5%	10%
Herzegovina-Neretva Canton	357	0.1%	2.9%
Brčko District	169	0.2%	1.4%
Bosnian-Podrinje Canton Goražde	100	0.4%	0.8%
Posavina Canton	65	0.1%	0.5%
Canton 10	39	0.05%	0.3%
West Herzegovina Canton	7	0.01%	0.06%

Municipalities with a significant ethnic Muslim population (500 or more):

- Velika Kladuša (1,366)
- Tuzla (1,050)
- Travnik (535)
- Zenica (531)

=== Slovenia ===
According to the 2002 census, there were 10,467 ethnic Muslims in Slovenia, making up 0.53% of the population.

Per the 2002 census, regarding religion, most ethnic Muslims declared themselves followers of Islam, 9,328 or 89.1% of them. Atheism was opted by 251 or 2.4%, with 231, or 2.2%, declaring themselves as believers not belonging to any religion. The rest were mainly undisclosed or unknown, with a small Eastern Orthodox and Catholic minority.

Bosnian was the mother tongue of 5,456, or 52.1%, of ethnic Muslims. Serbo-Croatian was listed as the mother tongue of 2,886, or 27.6%, of ethnic Muslims. Slovene was designated as the mother tongue of 1,136 ethnic Muslims, or 10.9%; Croatian of 525 ethnic Muslims or 5%; Serbian of 147 ethnic Muslims or 1.4%; and Albanian of 101 ethnic Muslims or 1%.

=== Montenegro ===
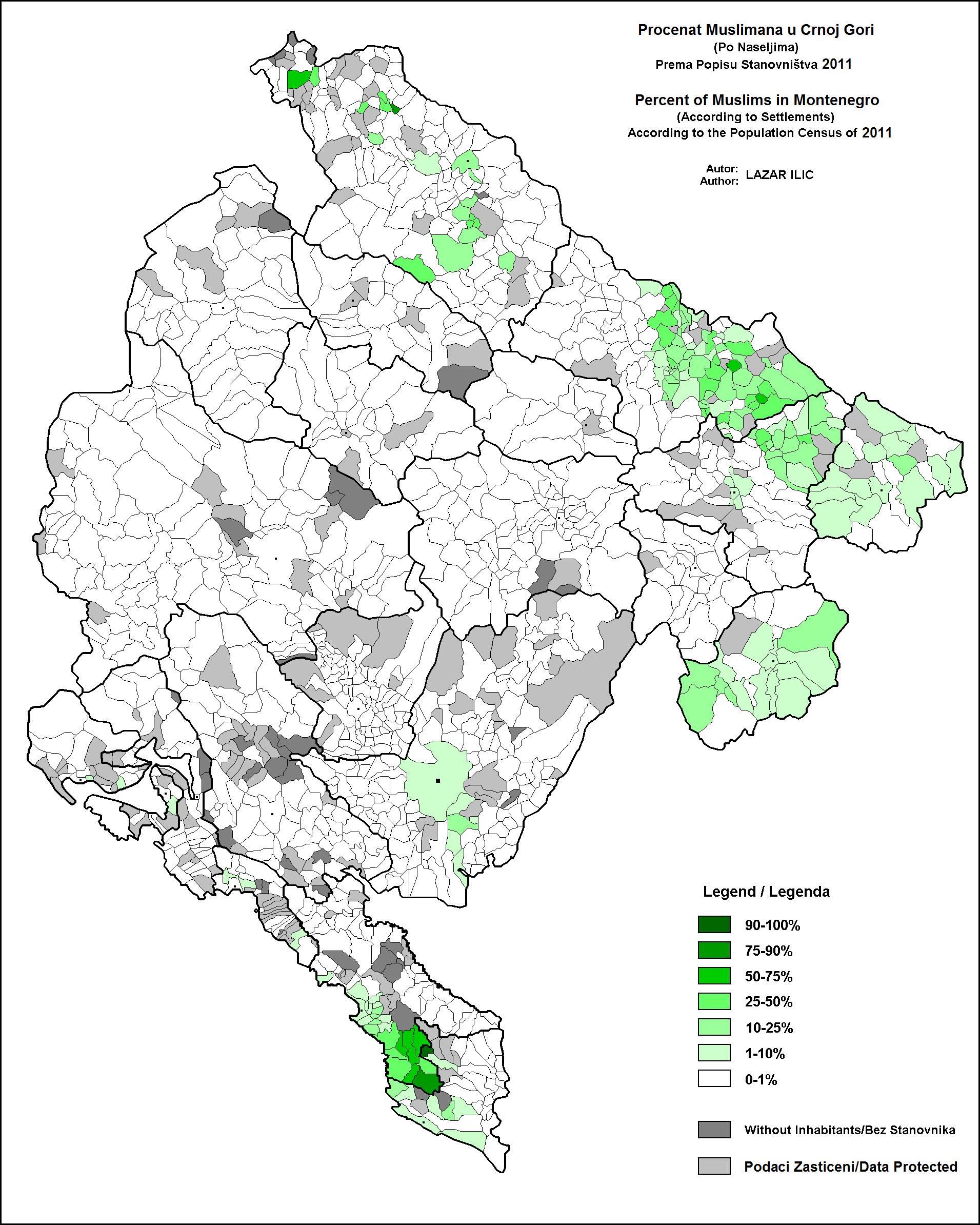
Ethnic Muslims in Montenegro, according to latest (2011) census

According to the 2023 census, there were 10,162 ethnic Muslims in Montenegro, making up 1.63% of the population.

Per the latest 2023 census, regarding religion, most ethnic Muslims declared themselves followers of Islam, 10,097 or 99.4% of them. The remaining part was mainly atheists and members of other religions, including Eastern Orthodox Christians, or undisclosed.

Montenegrin was the mother tongue of 8,550, or 84.1%, of ethnic Muslims. Bosnian was listed as the mother tongue of 464, or 4.6%, of ethnic Muslims, with an additional 101, or 1%, designating their language as Bosniak. Serbian was the mother tongue of 399, or 3.9%. Serbo-Croatian, or Montenegrin-Serbian-Bosnian-Croatian, was designated as the mother tongue of 235 ethnic Muslims, accounting for 2.3%. Albanian was the mother tongue of 175 ethnic Muslims, or 1.7%. The rest spoke other languages.

=== Croatia ===
According to the 2021 census, there were 3,902 ethnic Muslims.

The religious composition of ethnic Muslims in Croatia cannot be precisely determined, since the census grouped them with those who declared themselves Eastern Orthodox or with other ethnic religious designations. Per the census, 1,422 people declared Eastern Orthodoxy as their ethnicity, with 526 other people designating other religions as their ethnic designation. Of those combined, by religion, there were 3,436 Muslims, 1,266 Eastern Orthodox Christians, and 475 Catholics. There were 307 atheists and agnostics, while the rest belonged to other Christian denominations or religions.

The Croatian Bureau of Statistics did not publish data about the language of specific ethnic groups.

=== Other countries ===
- In North Macedonia, there were 1,187 ethnic Muslims according to the 2021 census.

== See also ==
- Bosniaks
- Serb Muslims
- Croat Muslims
- Bulgarian Muslims
- Gorani people
- Torbeši
- Pomaks
- Cultural Muslims
