= Environmental movement =

Movement for addressing environmental issues

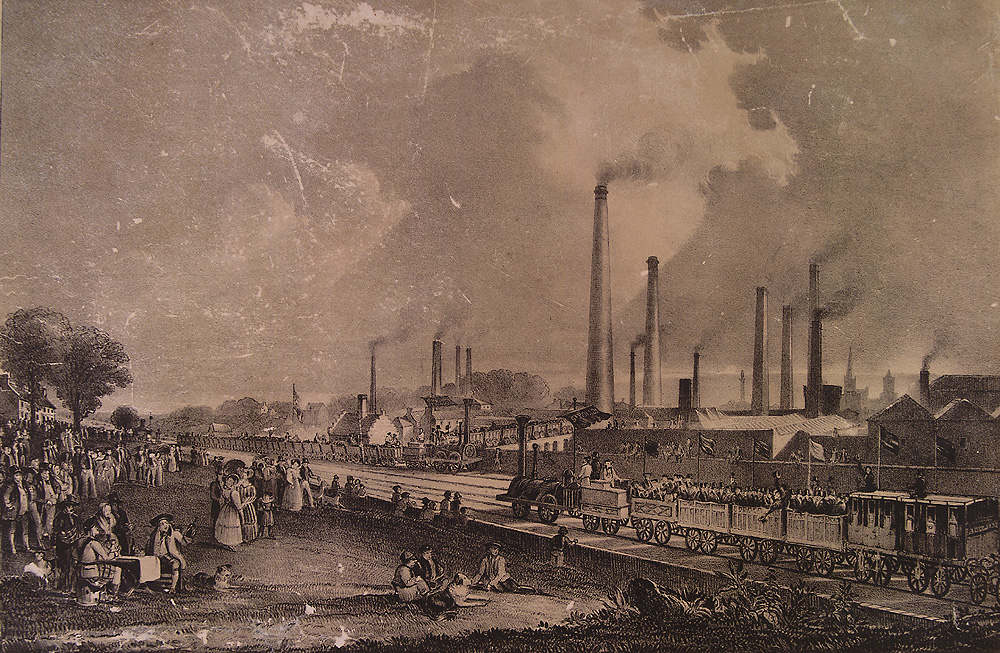
Levels of air pollution rose during the Industrial Revolution, sparking the first modern environmental laws to be passed in the mid-19th century.

The environmental movement, sometimes referred to as the ecology movement, is a social movement that aims to protect the natural world from harmful environmental practices in order to create sustainable living. In its recognition of humanity as a participant in (not an enemy of) ecosystems, the movement is centered on ecology, health, as well as human rights.

The environmental movement is an international movement, represented by a range of environmental organizations, from enterprises to grassroots and varies from country to country. Due to its large membership, varying and strong beliefs, and occasionally speculative nature, the environmental movement is not always united in its goals. At its broadest, the movement includes private citizens, professionals, religious devotees, politicians, scientists, nonprofit organizations, and individual advocates like former Wisconsin Senator Gaylord Nelson and Rachel Carson in the 20th century.

Since the 1970s, public awareness, environmental sciences, ecology, and technology have advanced to include modern focus points like ozone depletion, climate change, acid rain, mutation breeding, genetically modified crops and genetically modified livestock. The climate movement can be regarded as a sub-type of the environmental movement.

== Scope ==
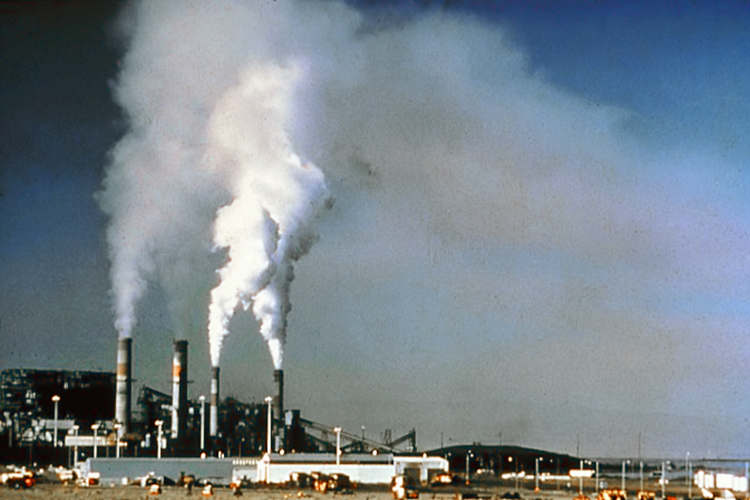
Before flue-gas desulfurization was installed, the air-polluting emissions from this power plant in New Mexico contained excessive amounts of sulfur dioxide.

The environmental movement contains a number of subcommunities, that have developed with different approaches and philosophies in different parts of the world. Notably, the early environmental movement experienced a deep tension between the philosophies of conservation and broader environmental protection. In recent decades the rise to prominence of environmental justice, indigenous rights and key environmental crises like the climate crises, has led to the development of other environmentalist identities.

=== Focus points ===
The environmental movement is broad in scope and can include any topic related to the environment, conservation, and biology, as well as the preservation of landscapes, flora, and fauna for a variety of purposes and uses. Examples include:

- Environmental conservation is the process in which one is involved in conserving the natural aspects of the environment. Whether through reforestation, recycling, or pollution control, environmental conservation sustains the natural quality of life.
- Environmental health movement dates at least to the Progressive Era, and focuses on urban standards like clean water, efficient sewage handling, and stable population growth. Environmental health could also deal with nutrition, preventive medicine, aging, and other concerns specific to human well-being. Environmental health is also seen as an indicator for the state of the environment, or an early warning system for what may happen to humans. This majorly helps the environment by making it so that fewer animals die.
- Environmental justice is a social movement that addresses injustice that occurs when poor or marginalized communities are harmed by hazardous waste, resource extraction, and other land uses from which they do not benefit.

==== Genetically modified plants and animals ====
Genetically modified plants and animals are said by some environmentalists to be inherently bad because they are unnatural. Others point out the possible benefits of GM crops such as water conservation through corn modified to be less "thirsty" and decreased pesticide use through insect-resistant crops. They also point out that some genetically modified livestock have accelerated growth which means there are shorter production cycles which again results in a more efficient use of feed. Besides genetically modified crops and livestock, synthetic biology is also on the rise and environmentalists argue that these also contain risks if these organisms were ever to end up in nature. This, as unlike with genetically modified organisms, synthetic biology even uses base pairs that do not exist in nature.

==== Anti-nuclear movement ====
The anti-nuclear movement opposes the use of various nuclear technologies. The initial anti-nuclear objective was nuclear disarmament and later the focus began to shift to other issues, mainly opposition to the use of nuclear power. There have been many large anti-nuclear demonstrations and protests. The pro-nuclear movement consists of people, including former opponents of nuclear energy, who calculate that the threat to humanity from climate change is far worse than any risk associated with nuclear energy. By the mid-1970s, anti-nuclear activism had moved beyond local protests and politics to gain a wider appeal and influence. Although it lacked a single coordinating organization the anti-nuclear movement's efforts gained a great deal of attention, especially in the United Kingdom and United States. In the aftermath of the Three Mile Island accident in 1979, many mass demonstrations took place. The largest one was held in New York City in September 1979 and involved 200,000 people.

=== Examples of environmental protests ===
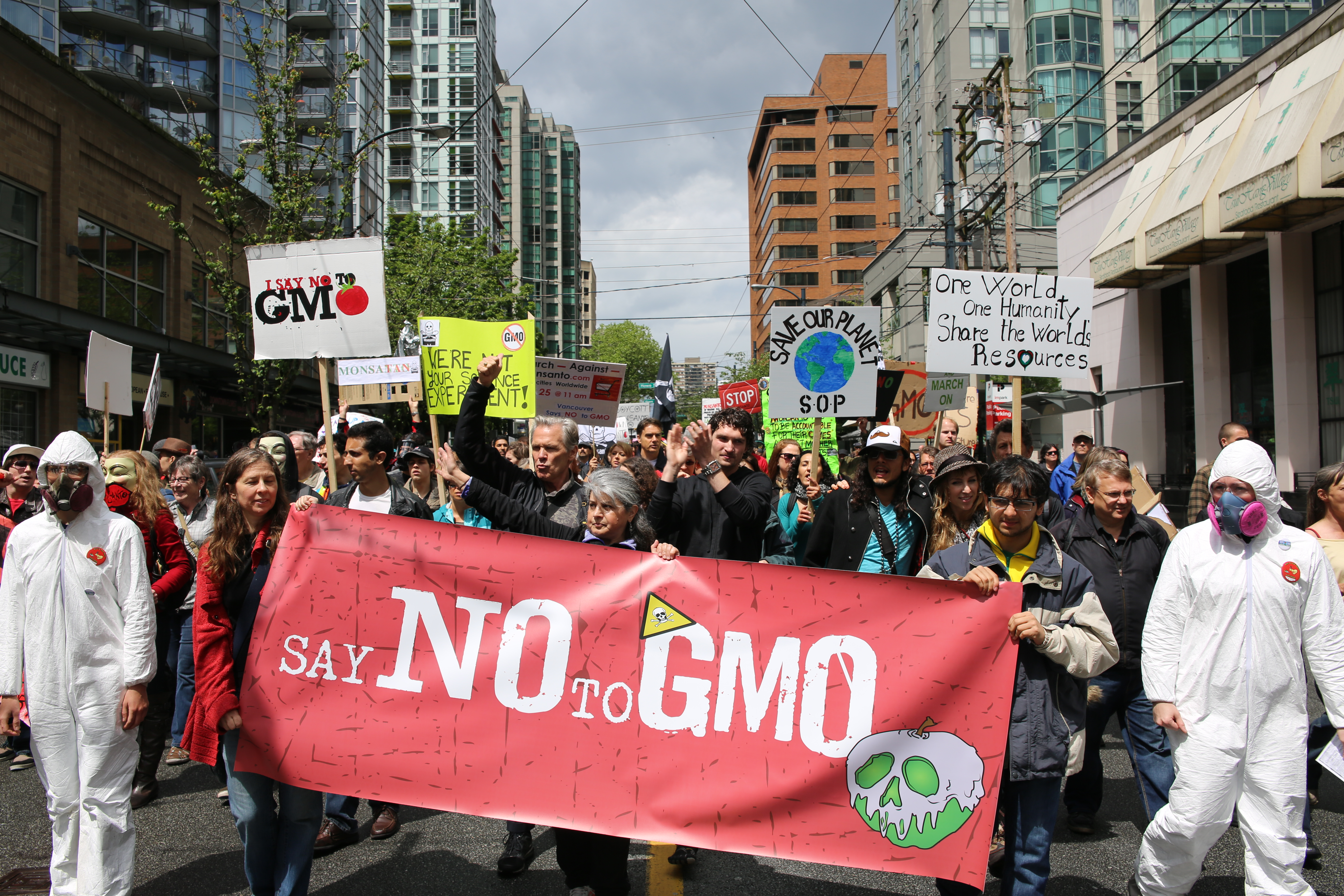
"March Against Monsanto", Vancouver, Canada, 25 May 2013

Tree sitting is a form of activism in which the protester sits in a tree in an attempt to stop the removal of a tree or to impede the demolition of an area with the longest and most famous tree-sitter being Julia Butterfly Hill, who spent 738 days in a California Redwood, saving a three-acre tract of forest. Also notable is the Yellow Finch tree sit, which was a 932-day blockade of the Mountain Valley Pipeline from 2018 to 2021. Sit-ins can be used to encourage social change, such as the Greensboro sit-ins, a series of protests in 1960 to stop racial segregation, but can also be used in ecoactivism, as in the Dakota Access Pipeline Protest. Notable environmental protests and campaigns include:

- 2010 Xinfa aluminum plant protest
- Anti-WAAhnsinns Festival
- Car-Free Days
- Camp for Climate Action
- Campaign against Climate Change
- Climate Rush
- Cofán people oil drilling protest (Ecuador)
- Earth Day
- Earth First!
- Earthlife Africa
- Extinction Rebellion
- Global Climate Strikes
- Global Day of Action
- Gurindji Strike
- Hands off our Forest
- Homes before Roads
- Water protectors
- Just Stop Oil
- Kupa Piti Kungka Tjuta
- Love Canal protests
- March Against Monsanto
- Nevada Desert Experience
- Plane Mad
- Plane Stupid
- Qidong protest
- Save Manapouri Campaign
- Say Yes demonstrations
- Shifang protest
- Stop Climate Chaos

== History ==
The origins of the environmental movement in Europe and North America lay in Smoke abatement programs in response to increasing levels of smoke pollution in the atmosphere during the Industrial Revolution. The emergence of great factories and the concomitant immense growth in coal consumption gave rise to an unprecedented level of air pollution in industrial centers; after 1900 the large volume of industrial chemical discharges added to the growing load of untreated human waste.

== Criticisms ==
Conservative critics of the movement characterize it as radical and misguided, and are critics of the United States Endangered Species Act, which came under scrutiny in the 21st century, and the Clean Air Act, which they said conflict with private property rights, corporate profits, and the nation's overall economic growth. Moreover, critics challenge the scientific evidence for global warming. They argue that the environmental movement has diverted attention from more pressing issues. Western environmental activists have also been criticized for performative activism, eco-colonialism, and enacting white savior tropes, especially celebrities who promote conservation in developing countries. When residents living near proposed developments organize opposition they are sometimes called "NIMBYS", short for "not in my back yard".

== By country ==
=== Asia ===
==== Bangladesh ====
Mithun Roy Chowdhury, President, Save Nature & Wildlife (SNW), Bangladesh, insisted that the people of Bangladesh raise their voice against Tipaimukh Dam, being constructed by the Government of India. He said the Tipaimukh Dam project will be another "death trap for Bangladesh like the Farakka Barrage," which would lead to an environmental disaster for 50 million people in the Meghna River basin. He said that this project will start desertification in Bangladesh. Bangladesh was ranked the most polluted country in the world due to defective automobiles, particularly diesel-powered vehicles, and hazardous gases from industry. The air is a hazard to Bangladesh's human health, ecology, and economic progress.

==== China ====
China's environmental movement is becoming stronger, with the establishment of environmental non-governmental organizations (NGOs) that are advocating policy changes and placing environmental causes on the national agenda. These activists have the tendency to spontaneously join with local citizens, specialists, as well as other actors to work on specific environmental concerns. Grassroots mobilization and protests have also become more common, frequently focusing on localized concerns such as pollution, forest depletion, or biodiversity conservation. Such campaigns may not necessarily attract extensive national media coverage, but collectively they promote environmental awareness and sustainability in China. Environmental protests in China are increasingly expanding their scope of concerns, calling for broader participation "in the name of the public."

The Chinese have realized the ability of riots and protests to succeed and had led to an increase in disputes in China by 30% since 2005 to more than 50,000 events. Protests cover topics such as environmental issues, land loss, income, and political issues. They have also grown in size from about 10 people or fewer in the mid-1990s to 52 people per incident in 2004. China has more relaxed environmental laws than other countries in Asia, so many polluting factories have relocated to China, causing pollution in China.

Water pollution, water scarcity, soil pollution, soil degradation, and desertification are issues currently in discussion in China. The groundwater table of the North China Plain is dropping by 1.5 m (5 ft) per year. This groundwater table occurs in the region of China that produces 40% of the country's grain. The Center for Legal Assistance to Pollution Victims works to confront legal issues associated with environmental justice by hearing court cases that expose the narratives of victims of environmental pollution. As China continues domestic economic reforms and integration into global markets, there emerge new linkages between China's domestic environmental degradation and global ecological crisis.

Comparing the experience of China, South Korea, Japan and Taiwan reveals that the impact of environmental activism is heavily modified by domestic political context, particularly the level of integration of mass-based protests and policy advocacy NGOs. Hinted by the history of neighboring Japan and South Korea, the possible convergence of NGOs and anti-pollution protests will have significant implications for Chinese environmental politics in the coming years.

==== India ====
Environmental and public health is an ongoing struggle within India. The first seed of an environmental movement in India was the foundation in 1964 of Dasholi Gram Swarajya Sangh, a labour cooperative started by Chandi Prasad Bhatt. It was inaugurated by Sucheta Kriplani and founded on land donated by Shyma Devi. This initiative was eventually followed up with the Chipko movement starting in 1974. The most severe single event underpinning the movement was the Bhopal gas leakage on 3 December 1984. 40 tons of methyl isocyanate was released, immediately killing 2,259 people and ultimately affecting 700,000 citizens. India has a national campaign against Coca-Cola and Pepsi Cola plants due to their practices of drawing groundwater and contaminating fields with sludge. The movement is characterized by local struggles against intensive aquaculture farms. The most influential part of the environmental movement in India is the anti-dam movement. Dam creation has been thought of as a way for India to catch up with the West by connecting to the power grid with giant dams, coal or oil-powered plants, or nuclear plants. Jhola Aandolan a mass movement is conducting a campaign against the use of polyethylene carry bags and promoting cloth/jute/paper carry bags to protect the environment and nature. Activists in the Indian environmental movement consider global warming, sea levels rising, and glaciers retreating decreasing the amount of water flowing into streams to be the biggest challenges for them to face in the early 21st century.

In 2008, the Eco Revolution movement was started by Eco Needs Foundation. Based in Aurangabad Maharashtra, it seeks the participation of children, youth, researchers, spiritual, and political leaders to organise awareness programmes and conferences. Child activists against air pollution in India and greenhouse gas emissions by India include Licypriya Kangujam. From the mid to late 2010s a coalition of urban and Indigenous communities came together to protect Aarey, a forest located in the suburbs of Mumbai. Farming and indigenous communities have also opposed pollution and clearing caused by mining in states such as Goa, Odisha, and Chhattisgarh.

==== Middle East ====
Share of agricultural land which is irrigated (2021)

Environmental activism in the Arab world, including Middle East and North Africa (MENA), mobilizes around issues such as industrial pollution and insists that the government provides irrigation. The League of Arab States has one specialized sub-committee, of 12 standing specialized subcommittees in the Foreign Affairs Ministerial Committees, which deals with Environmental Issues. Countries in the League of Arab States have demonstrated an interest in environmental issues on paper; some environmental activists have doubts about the level of commitment to environmental issues. Being a part of the world community may have obliged these countries to portray concern for the environment. The initial level of environmental awareness may be the creation of a ministry of the environment. The year of establishment of a ministry is also indicative of the level of engagement. Saudi Arabia was the first to establish environmental law in 1992 followed by Egypt in 1994. Somalia is the only country without environmental law. In 2010 the Environmental Performance Index listed Algeria as the top Arab country at 42 of 163; Morocco was at 52 and Syria at 56. The Environmental Performance Index measures the ability of a country to actively manage and protect its environment and the health of its citizens. A weighted index is created by giving 50% weight to the environmental health objective (health) and 50% to ecosystem vitality (ecosystem); values range from 0–100. No Arab countries were in the top quartile, and 7 countries were in the lowest quartile.

==== South Korea and Taiwan ====
South Korea and Taiwan experienced similar growth in industrialization from 1965 to 1990 with few environmental controls. South Korea's Han River and Nakdong River were so polluted by unchecked dumping of industrial waste that they were close to being classified as biologically dead. Taiwan's formula for balanced growth was to prevent industrial concentration and encourage manufacturers to set up in the countryside. This led to 20% of the farmland being polluted by industrial waste and 30% of the rice grown on the island was contaminated with heavy metals. Both countries had spontaneous environmental movements drawing participants from different classes. Their demands were linked with issues of employment, occupational health, and agricultural crisis. They were also quite militant; the people learned that protesting can bring results. The polluting factories were forced to make immediate improvements to the conditions or pay compensation to victims. Some were even forced to shut down or move locations. The people were able to force the government to come out with new restrictive rules on toxins, industrial waste, and air pollution. All of these new regulations caused the migration of those polluting industries from Taiwan and South Korea to China and other countries in Southeast Asia with more relaxed environmental laws.

==== Conservation movements in India and Burma during Colonial times ====
The modern conservation movement was manifested in the forests of India, with the practical application of scientific conservation principles. The conservation ethic that began to evolve included three core principles: human activity damaged the environment, there was a civic duty to maintain the environment for future generations, and scientific, empirically based methods should be applied to ensure this duty was carried out. James Ranald Martin was prominent in promoting this ideology, publishing many medico-topographical reports that demonstrated the scale of damage wrought through large-scale deforestation and desiccation, and lobbying extensively for the institutionalization of forest conservation activities in British India through the establishment of Forest Departments.

The Madras Board of Revenue started local conservation efforts in 1842, headed by Alexander Gibson, a professional botanist who systematically adopted a forest conservation programme based on scientific principles. This was the first case of state management of forests in the world. Eventually, the government under Governor-General Lord Dalhousie introduced the first permanent and large-scale forest conservation programme in the world in 1855, a model that soon spread to other colonies, as well as the United States. In 1860, the Department banned the use of shifting cultivation. Hugh Cleghorn's 1861 manual, The forests and gardens of South India, became the definitive work on the subject and was widely used by forest assistants in the subcontinent.

Dietrich Brandis joined the British service in 1856 as superintendent of the teak forests of Pegu division in eastern Burma. During that time Burma's teak forests were controlled by militant Karen tribals. He introduced the "taungya" system, in which Karen villagers provided labour for clearing, planting, and weeding teak plantations. Also, he formulated new forest legislation and helped establish research and training institutions. Brandis as well as founded the Imperial Forestry School at Dehradun.

=== Africa ===
==== South Africa ====
In 2022, a court in South Africa confirmed the constitutional right of the country's citizens to an environment that is not harmful to their health, which includes the right to clean air. The case is referred to as the "Deadly Air" case. The area includes one of South Africa's largest cities, Ekurhuleni, and a large portion of the Mpumalanga province.

=== Americas ===
==== Latin America ====
After the International Environmental Conference in Stockholm in 1972 Latin American officials returned with high hopes of growth and protection of the fairly untouched natural resources. Governments spent millions of dollars and created departments and pollution standards. However, the outcomes have not always been what officials had initially hoped. Activists blame this on growing urban populations and industrial growth. Many Latin American countries have had a large inflow of immigrants who are living in substandard housing. Enforcement of the pollution standards is lax and penalties are minimal; in Venezuela, the largest penalty for violating an environmental law is a 50,000 bolivar fine ($3,400) and three days in jail. In the 1970s or 1980s, many Latin American countries were transitioning from military dictatorships to democratic governments.

===== Brazil =====
In 1992, Brazil came under scrutiny with the United Nations Conference on Environment and Development in Rio de Janeiro. Brazil has a history of little environmental awareness. It has the highest biodiversity in the world and also the highest amount of habitat destruction. One-third of the world's forests lie in Brazil. It is home to the largest river, The Amazon, and the largest rainforest, the Amazon rainforest. People have raised funds to create state parks and increase awareness among people who have destroyed forests and polluted waterways. From 1973 to the 1990s, and then in the 2000s, indigenous communities and rubber tappers also carried out blockades that protected much rainforest. It is home to several organizations that have fronted the environmental movement. The Blue Wave Foundation was created in 1989 and has partnered with advertising companies to promote national education campaigns to keep Brazil's beaches clean. Funatura was created in 1986 and is a wildlife sanctuary program. Pro-Natura International is a private environmental organization created in 1986. From the late 2000s onwards, community resistance saw the formerly pro-mining southeastern state of Minas Gerais cancel a number of projects that threatened to destroy forests. In northern Brazil’s Pará state the Movimento dos Trabalhadores Rurais Sem Terra (Landless Workers Movement) and others campaigned and took part in occupations and blockades against the environmentally harmful Carajás iron ore mine.

==== United States ====
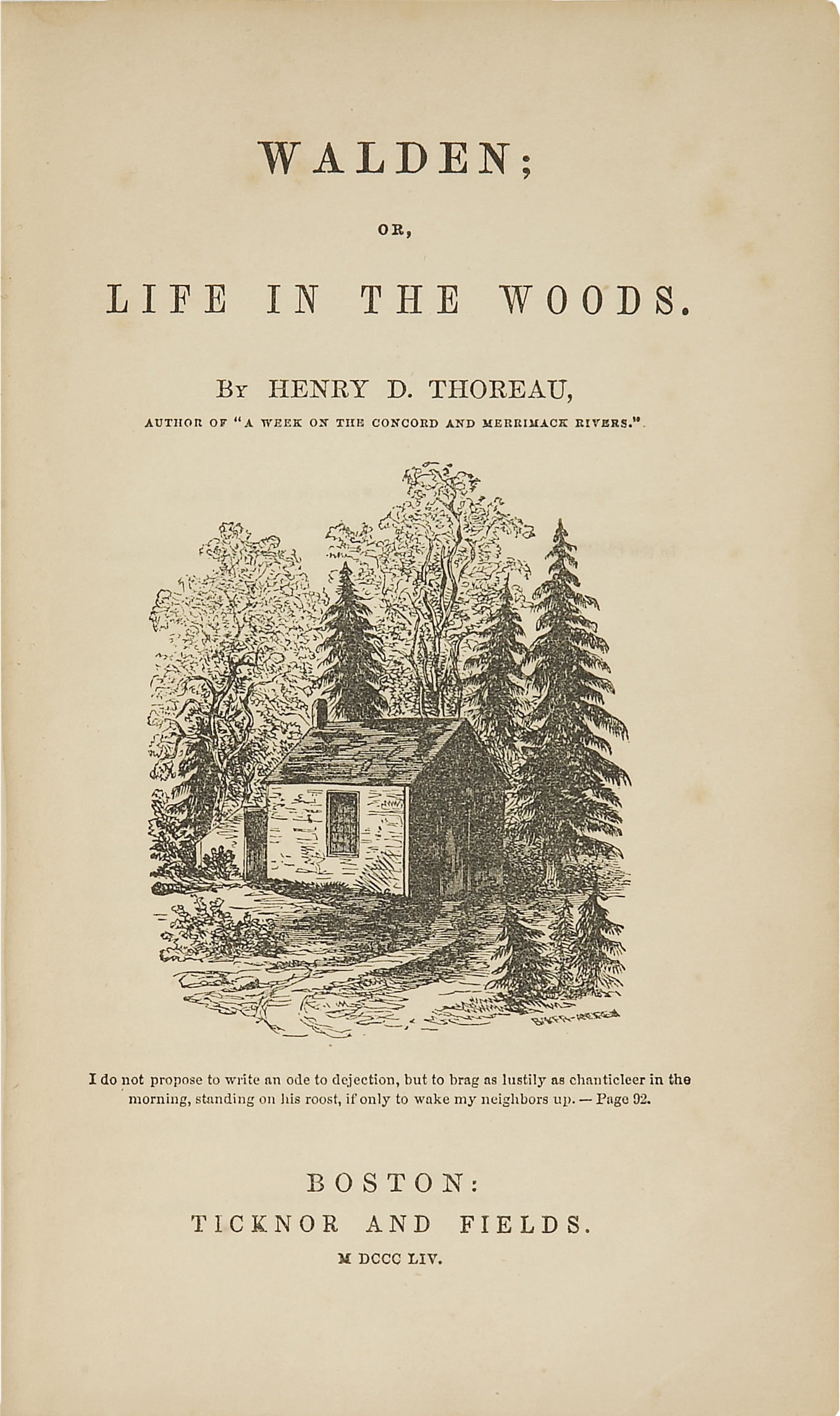
Original title page of Walden by Henry David Thoreau

The movement in the United States began in the late 19th century, out of concerns for protecting the natural resources of the West, with individuals such as John Muir and Henry David Thoreau making key philosophical contributions. Thoreau was interested in people's relationship with nature and studied this by living close to nature in a simple life. He published his experiences in the 1854 book Walden, which argues that people should become intimately close with nature. Muir came to believe in nature's inherent right, especially after spending time hiking in Yosemite Valley and studying both the ecology and geology. He successfully lobbied Congress to form Yosemite National Park and went on to set up the Sierra Club in 1892. The conservationist principles as well as the belief in an inherent right of nature became the bedrock of modern environmentalism.

Beginning in the conservation movement at the beginning of the 20th century, the contemporary environmental movement's roots can be traced back to Rachel Carson's 1962 book Silent Spring, Murray Bookchin's 1962 book Our Synthetic Environment, and Paul R. Ehrlich's 1968 The Population Bomb. American environmentalists have campaigned against nuclear weapons and nuclear power in the 1960s and 1970s, acid rain in the 1980s, ozone depletion and deforestation in the 1990s, and most recently climate change and global warming. Individuals such as Hope Sawyer Buyukmihci and Dorothy Richardson have attempted to change attitudes towards individual species of animal experiencing habitat loss and over-exploitation. The United States passed many pieces of environmental legislation in the 1970s, such as the Clean Water Act, the Clean Air Act, the Endangered Species Act, and the National Environmental Policy Act. These remain as the foundations for current environmental standards. In the 1990s, the anti-environmental 'Wise Use' movement emerged in the United States.

=== Europe ===
The EU's environmental policy was formally founded by a European Council declaration and the first five-year environment programme was adopted. The polluter pays principle was well established in environmental economics before it was included in the Single European Act. Following the 1973 oil crisis the Social Democratic Party of Germany (SPD) passed groundbreaking laws on energy efficiency.

==== Germany ====
During the 1930s the Nazis had elements that were supportive of animal rights, zoos and wildlife, and took several measures to ensure their protection. In 1933 the government created a stringent animal-protection law and in 1934, Das Reichsjagdgesetz (The Reich Hunting Law) was enacted which limited hunting. Several Nazis were environmentalists (notably Rudolf Hess), and species protection and animal welfare were significant issues in the regime. In 1935, the regime enacted the "Reich Nature Protection Act" (Reichsnaturschutzgesetz). The concept of the Dauerwald (best translated as the "perpetual forest") which included concepts such as forest management and protection was promoted and efforts were also made to curb air pollution.

==== Spain ====
During the Spanish Revolution in 1936, anarchist-controlled territories undertook several environmental reforms, which were possibly the largest in the world at the time. Daniel Guerin notes that anarchist territories would diversify crops, extend irrigation, initiate reforestation, start tree nurseries and help to establish naturist communities. Once there was a link discovered between air pollution and tuberculosis, the CNT shut down several metal factories.

==== United Kingdom ====
The late 19th century saw the formation of the first wildlife conservation societies. The zoologist Alfred Newton published a series of investigations into the Desirability of establishing a 'Close-time' for the preservation of indigenous animals between 1872 and 1903. His advocacy for legislation to protect animals from hunting during the mating season led to the formation of the Plumage League (later the Royal Society for the Protection of Birds) in 1889. The society acted as a protest group campaigning against the use of great crested grebe and kittiwake skins and feathers in fur clothing. The Society campaigned for greater protection for the indigenous birds of the island. The Society attracted growing support from the suburban middle-classes, and influenced the passage of the Sea Birds Preservation Act in 1869 as the first nature protection law in the world. It also attracted support from many other influential figures, such as the ornithologist Professor Alfred Newton. By 1900, public support for the organisation had grown, and it had over 25,000 members. The garden city movement incorporated many environmental concerns into its urban planning manifesto; the Socialist League and The Clarion movement also began to advocate measures of nature conservation.

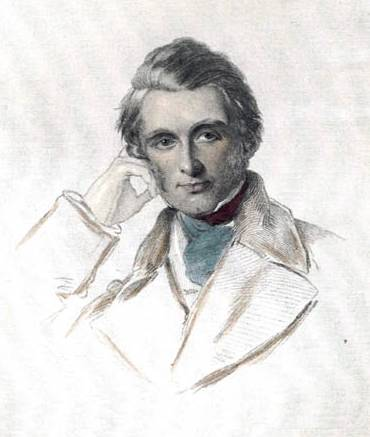
John Ruskin, an influential thinker who articulated the Romantic ideal of environmental protection and conservation

For most of the century from 1850 to 1950, the primary environmental cause was the mitigation of air pollution. The Coal Smoke Abatement Society was formed in 1898 making it one of the oldest environmental NGOs. It was founded by artist Sir William Blake Richmond, frustrated with the pall cast by coal smoke. Although there were earlier pieces of legislation, the Public Health Act 1875 required all furnaces and fireplaces to consume their own smoke. Systematic and general efforts on behalf of the environment only began in the late 19th century; it grew out of the amenity movement in Britain in the 1870s, which was a reaction to industrialization, the growth of cities, and worsening air and water pollution. Starting with the formation of the Commons Preservation Society in 1865, the movement championed rural preservation against the encroachments of industrialisation. Robert Hunter, solicitor for the society, worked with Hardwicke Rawnsley, Octavia Hill, and John Ruskin to lead a successful campaign to prevent the construction of railways to carry slate from the quarries, which would have ruined the unspoilt valleys of Newlands and Ennerdale. This success led to the formation of the Lake District Defence Society (later to become The Friends of the Lake District).

In 1893 Hill, Hunter and Rawnsley agreed to set up a national body to coordinate environmental conservation efforts across the country; the "National Trust for Places of Historic Interest or Natural Beauty" was formally inaugurated in 1894. The organisation obtained secure footing through the 1907 National Trust Bill, which gave the trust the status of a statutory corporation, and the bill was passed in August 1907. Early interest in the environment was a feature of the Romantic movement in the early 19th century. The poet William Wordsworth had travelled extensively in England's Lake District and wrote that it is a "sort of national property in which every man has a right and interest who has an eye to perceive and a heart to enjoy".

An early "Back-to-Nature" movement, which anticipated the romantic ideal of modern environmentalism, was advocated by intellectuals such as John Ruskin, William Morris, George Bernard Shaw and Edward Carpenter, who were all against consumerism, pollution and other activities that were harmful to the natural world. The movement was a reaction to the urban conditions of the industrial towns, where sanitation was awful, pollution levels intolerable and housing terribly cramped. Idealists championed the rural life as a mythical utopia and advocated a return to it. John Ruskin argued that people should return to a "small piece of English ground, beautiful, peaceful, and fruitful. We will have no steam engines upon it ... we will have plenty of flowers and vegetables ... we will have some music and poetry; the children will learn to dance to it and sing it." Ruskin moved out of London and together with his friends started to think about the post-industrial society. The predictions Ruskin made for the post-coal utopia coincided with forecasting published by the economist William Stanley Jevons. Practical ventures in the establishment of small cooperative farms were even attempted and old rural traditions, without the "taint of manufacture or the canker of artificiality", were enthusiastically revived, including the Morris dance and the maypole.

The Coal Smoke Abatement Society (now Environmental Protection UK) was formed in 1898 making it one of the oldest environmental NGOs. It was founded by artist Sir William Blake Richmond, frustrated with the pall cast by coal smoke. Although there were earlier pieces of legislation, the Public Health Act 1875 required all furnaces and fireplaces to consume their own smoke. It also provided for sanctions against factories that emitted large amounts of black smoke. This law's provisions were extended in 1926 with the Smoke Abatement Act to include other emissions, such as soot, ash, and gritty particles, and to empower local authorities to impose their own regulations. It was only under the impetus of the Great Smog of 1952 in London, which almost brought the city to a standstill and may have caused upward of 6,000 deaths, that the Clean Air Act 1956 was passed and airborne pollution in the city was first tackled. Financial incentives were offered to householders to replace open coal fires with alternatives (such as installing gas fires) or if they preferred, to burn coke instead (a byproduct of town gas production) which produces minimal smoke. 'Smoke control areas' were introduced in some towns and cities where only smokeless fuels could be burnt and power stations were relocated away from cities. The act formed an important impetus to modern environmentalism and caused a rethinking of the dangers of environmental degradation to people's quality of life.

=== Oceania ===
==== Australia ====
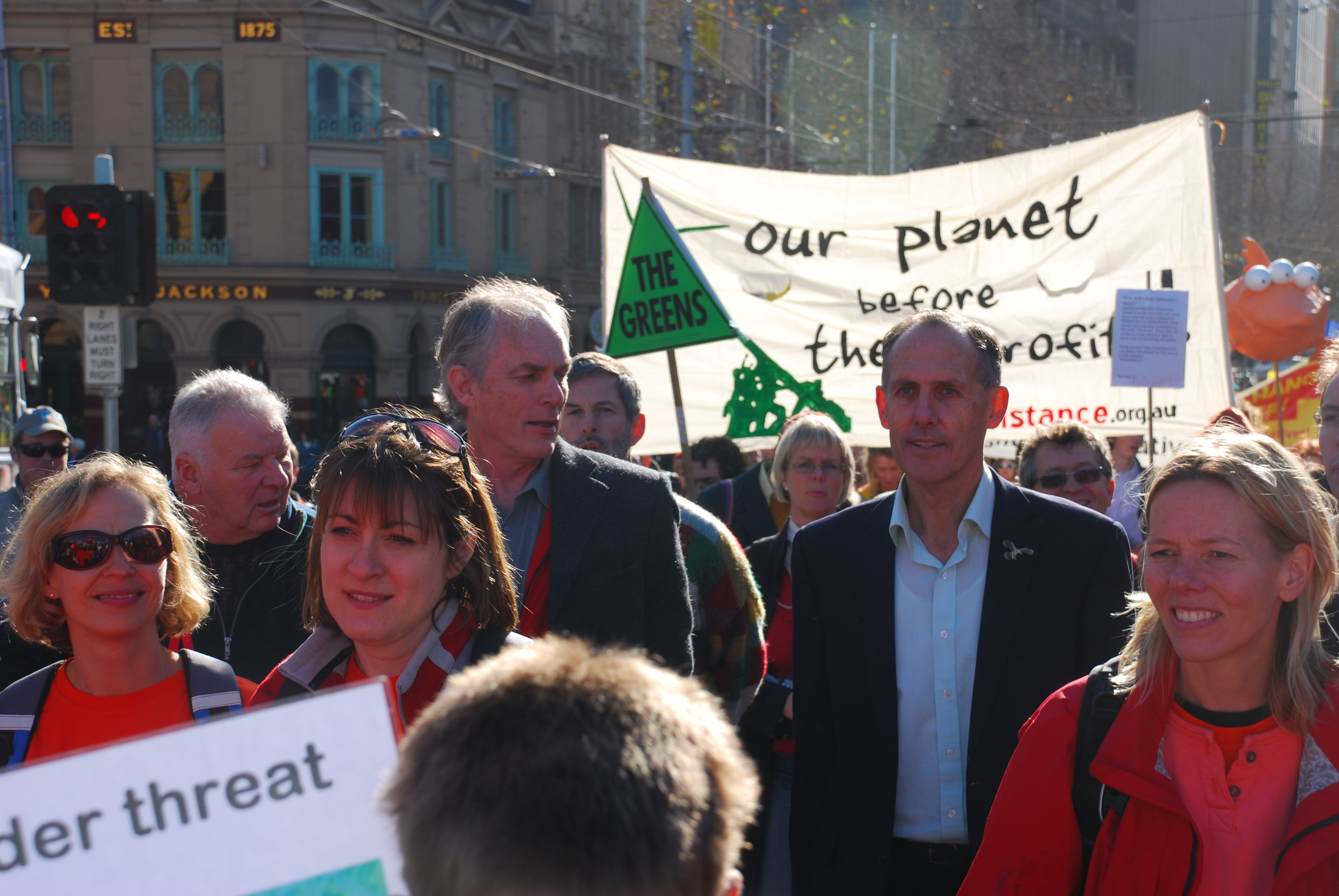
A climate change rally in Melbourne on 5 July 2008

Beginning as a conservation movement, the environmental movement in Australia was the first in the world to become a political movement. Australia is home to United Tasmania Group, the world's first green party. The environmental movement is represented by a wide range of groups sometimes called non-governmental organizations (NGOs). These exist on local, national, and international scales. Environmental NGOs vary widely in political views and in the amount they seek to influence environmental policy in Australia and elsewhere. The environmental movement today consists of both large national groups and also many smaller local groups with local concerns.

There are 5,000 Landcare groups in the six states and two mainland territories. Other environmental issues within the scope of the movement include forest protection, climate change and opposition to nuclear activities. In Australia, the movement has seen a growth in popularity through prominent Australian environmentalists such as Bob Brown, Peter Garrett, Steve Irwin, Tim Flannery, and David Fleay.

==== New Zealand ====
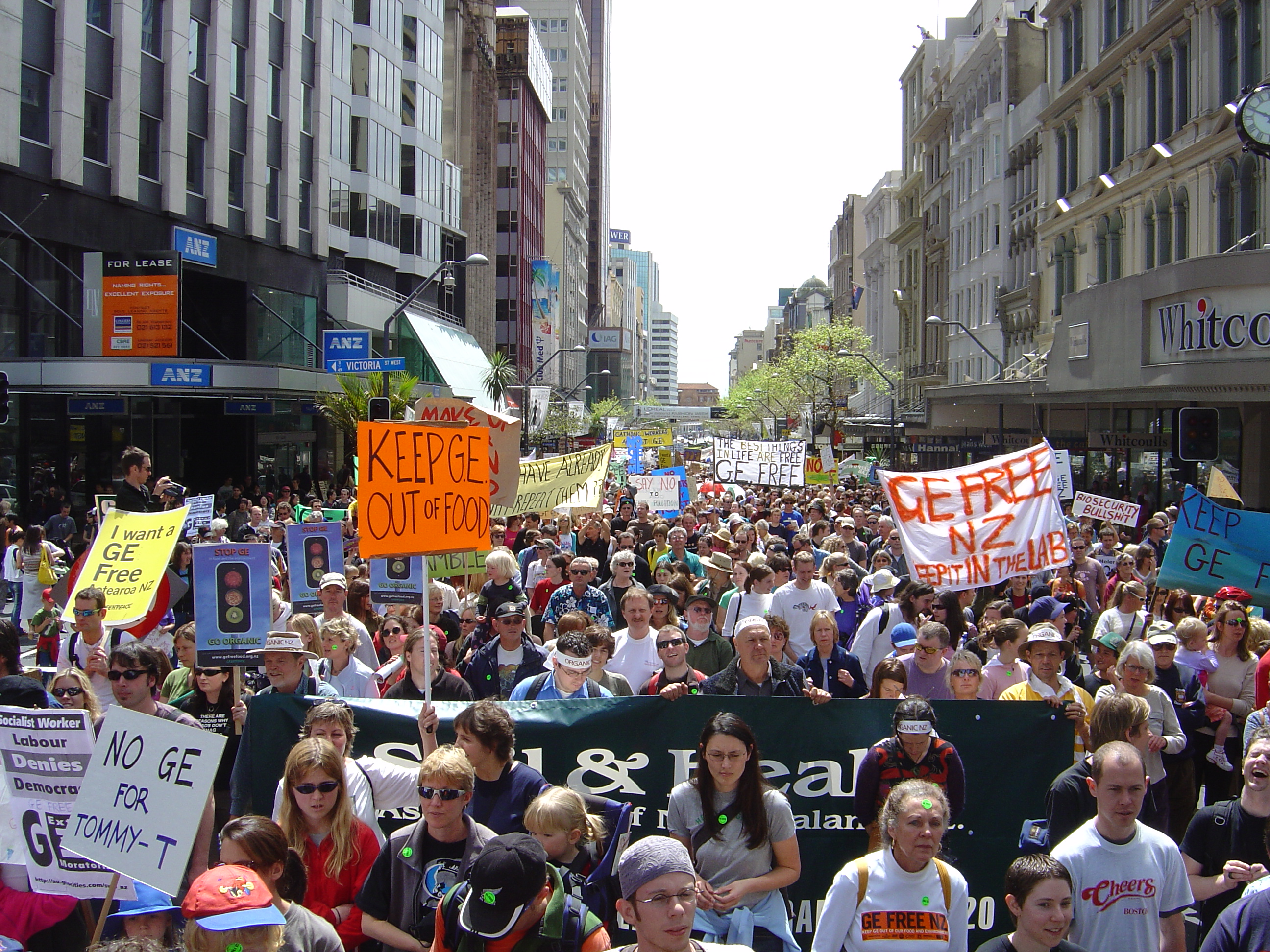
Part of a protest march held in 2003 voicing opposition to genetic engineering, making its way up Queen St, a main thoroughfare of Auckland

The environmental movement in New Zealand started in the 1950s, a period of rapid social change. Since then multiple high-profile national campaigns have contested various environmental issues including forest protection, transport decarbonisation, and coal mining. The environmental movement eventually spawned the Values Party, which was the first political party with a strong focus on environmental issues to contest national elections. The Values Party eventually morphed into the Green Party of Aotearoa New Zealand.

== See also ==
- Anti-consumerism
- Earth Science
- Earth Strike
- Ecological economics
- Eco-socialism
- Environmental defender
- Environmental justice
- Environmental organizations
- Green movement
- Holistic management
- List of women climate scientists and activists
- Political representation of nature
- Positive environmentalism
- Social ecology
- Sustainability
- Timeline of environmental events
- Water protector
