= Tamsin Omond =

British author, environmental activist and journalist

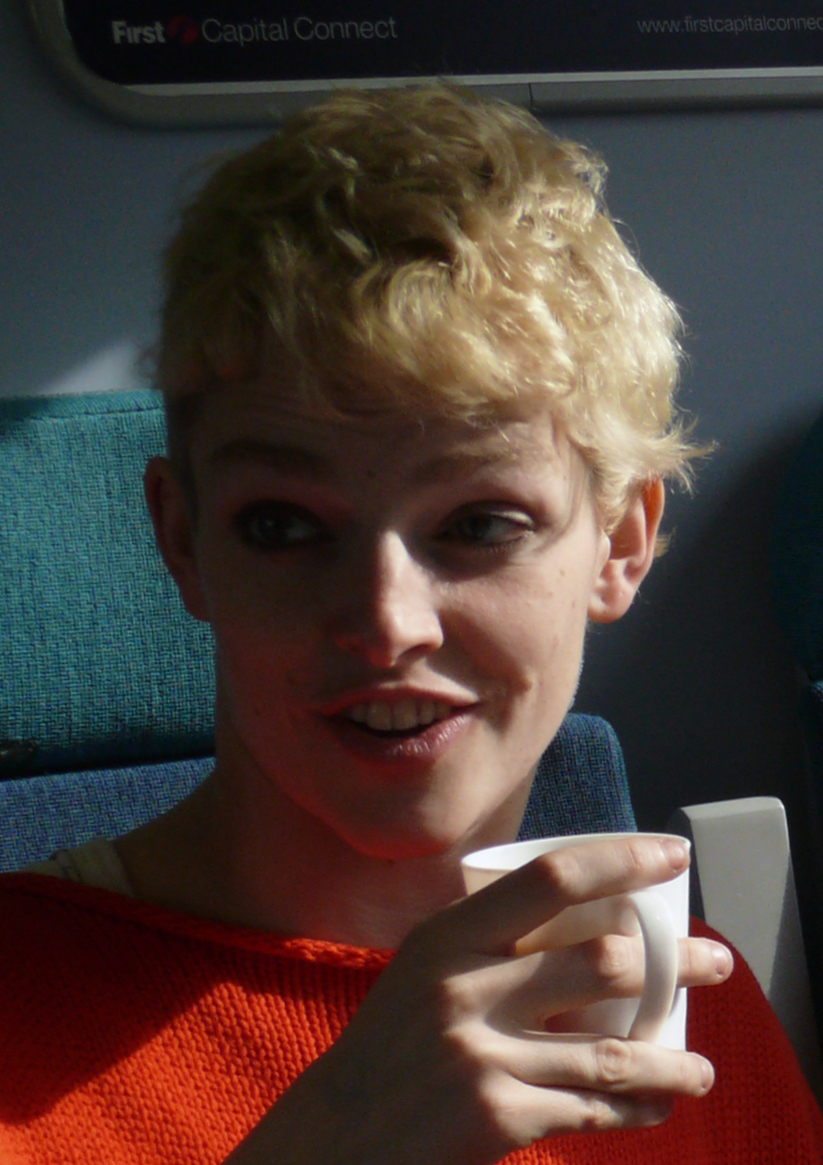
- Tamsin Omond in 2011

Personal details
- Born: 19 November 1984 (age 41)
- Party: Scottish Greens (March 2022 – present)
- Other political affiliations: Green Party of England and Wales (until 2022)
- Education: Westminster School
- Alma mater: Trinity College, Cambridge; Open University (MA)
- Website: www.tamsinomond.com

Tamsin Omond (born 19 November 1984) is a British author, environmental activist and journalist. They (Note: Omond identifies as non-binary and uses they/them pronouns.) have campaigned for the government of the United Kingdom to take action to avoid climate change.

== Early life and education ==
Tamsin Omond was born on 19 November 1984. They were educated at Westminster School and Trinity College, Cambridge. They went on to complete a master's degree in ecology and social justice with the Open University.

== Climate activism ==
In 2009, Omond's book Rush – The Making of a Climate Activist was published. In 2009 Omond was placed in the Sunday Times's Top 30 Power Players Under-30. They were also placed in 56th place in the Independent on Sunday's 2009 "Pink List", a list of the 101 most influential gay men and women in Britain. In 2010, they created a political party called The Commons which planned to engage young people in voting and promote sustainability in the local area. It was praised by the journalist Giles Coren. They received 0.2% of the vote.

Omond originally campaigned as a member of the activist group Plane Stupid, although the group said in 2012 that Omond had stopped working with them. They are a founding member of the activist group Climate Rush. They have organised a number of high-profile protests, including scaling the roof of the House of Commons to protest against aviation, for which they were arrested and bailed on the condition that they did not enter Parliament. In October 2008, they breached this condition by organising a 500-person "rush" on the Parliament of the United Kingdom. This led to them being re-arrested and threatened with imprisonment due to their breach of bail. Instead they were then bailed with a strengthening of their bail conditions to ban them from going within one kilometre of Parliament.

Omond has also organised protests against the expansion of Heathrow Airport. Omond has said that their activism has been inspired by the Suffragettes, who had campaigned using direct action for Women's suffrage in the United Kingdom at the beginning of the 20th century. An independent film has been made about Omond's connection to the campaigning techniques of the women's suffrage movement. Omond dressed as a suffragette for an anti-car protest targeting Jeremy Clarkson.

They were a founding member and activist in the climate protest movement Extinction Rebellion. In that capacity, they spoke at the Port Eliot Festival in 2019 about the group's campaign for people to not buy any new clothes for a year.

In 2021, Omond's second book Do Earth – Healing Strategies for Humankind was published.

== Green Party ==
Omond later joined the Green Party of England and Wales. In the 2015 general election, they were the party's candidate for East Ham, where they received 2.5% of the vote, finishing fourth.

Omond ran as a candidate on a joint platform with Amelia Womack to be co-leader of the Green Party of England and Wales in the 2021 Green Party of England and Wales leadership election. Omond's candidacy is believed to be the first time a non-binary person has stood for the leadership of a national party. Omond and Womack said that their joint candidacy "was aimed at getting more young people involved in the party" and offering "young intersectional feminist leadership". The election was in the event won by Carla Denyer and Adrian Ramsay.

On 1 March 2022, Omond announced that they had left the Green Party of England and Wales, criticising party processes such as conference being "used by terfs as tools to exclude and humiliate trans people."

In late January 2022, Omond tweeted about "a mid term plan" to move to Glasgow with their partner and join the Scottish Greens. On 2 March 2022, they tweeted a screenshot showing that they had joined the Scottish Greens, saying that they were glad for the party's "trans inclusive actions" and that they could be in "the arms of a party that listens to marginalised people and takes inclusion seriously" and that they planned to move to Glasgow the following year (2023).

== Personal life ==
Omond identifies as trans and non-binary, and uses they/them pronouns. They previously worked as head of global campaigns at the cosmetic company Lush.

== Bibliography ==
- Rush! : The Making of a Climate Activist. London: Marion Boyars. 2012. ISBN 978-0-7145-2240-1. OCLC 792686498.
- Omond, Tamsin (2021). Do Earth : Healing Strategies for Humankind. Do Book Company. ISBN 978-1-914168-00-0. OCLC 1259541445.
