= Environmental movement in Australia =

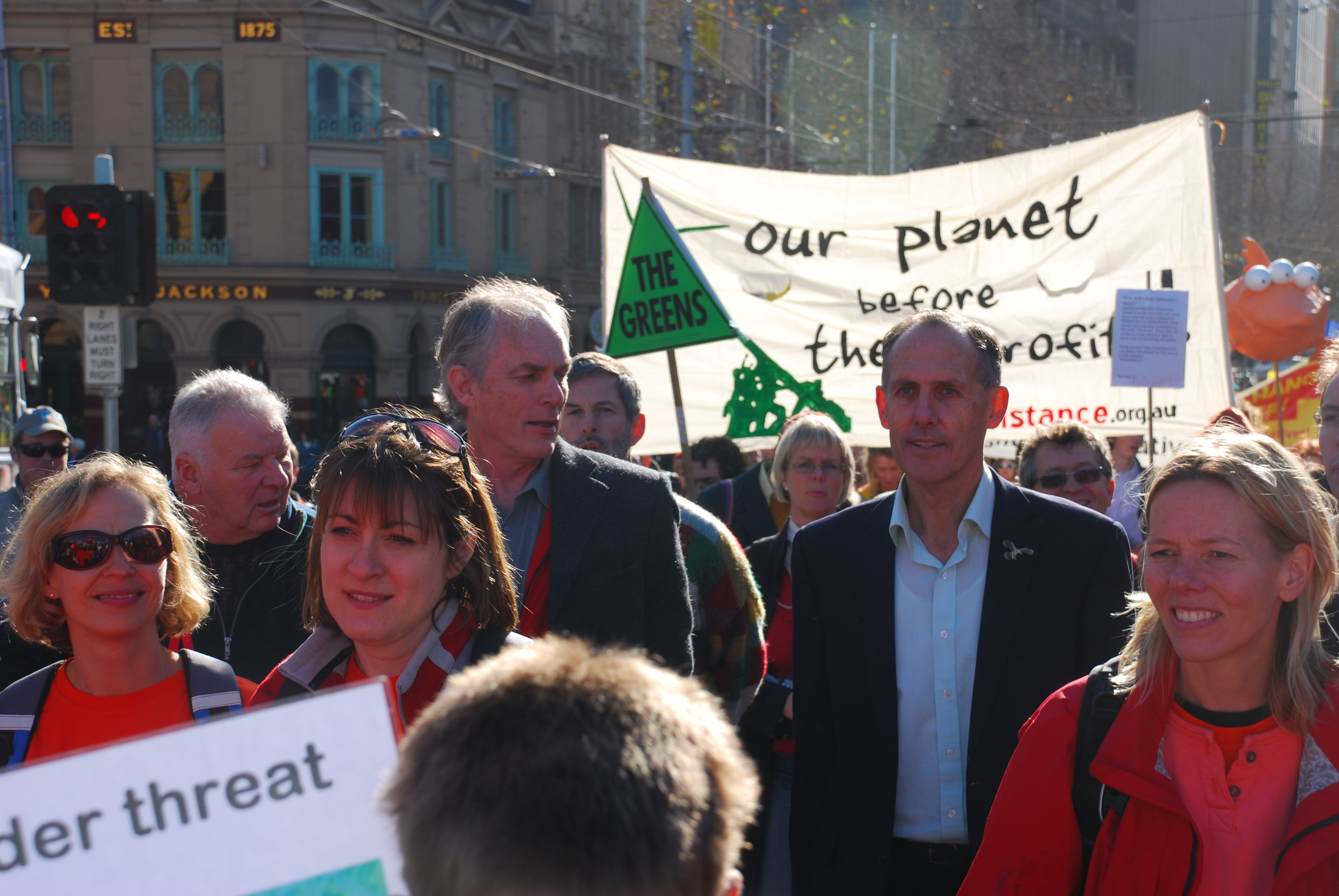
A climate change rally in Melbourne on 5 July 2008

Beginning as a conservation movement, the environmental movement in Australia was the first in the world to become a political movement. Australia is home to United Tasmania Group, the world's first green party. The environmental movement is represented by a wide range of groups sometimes called non-governmental organizations (NGOs). These exist on local, national, and international scales. Environmental NGOs vary widely in political views and in the amount they seek to influence environmental policy in Australia and elsewhere. The environmental movement today consists of both large national groups and also many smaller local groups with local concerns.

There are 5,000 Landcare groups in the six states and two mainland territories. Other environmental issues within the scope of the movement include forest protection, climate change and opposition to nuclear activities. In Australia, the movement has seen a growth in popularity through prominent Australian environmentalists such as Bob Brown, Peter Garrett, Steve Irwin, Tim Flannery, and David Fleay.

== Scope of the movement ==
At a political level, the most influential organisation is the Australian Greens. In recent years the Greens have at times held the balance of power in the Australian Senate. The strongest areas of focus are Landcare, conservation in Australia, clean energy and the Australian anti-nuclear movement. The largest and most influential and active environmental organizations in Australia are World Wildlife Fund, The Wilderness Society, Greenpeace, and the Australian Conservation Foundation. Alongside mass marches, trade unions bans were placed on uranium export and disruptive actions held at ports and other locations. There are also a large number of smaller conservation and advocacy groups. Many groups are involved in active acquisition for conservation as non-profit trusts or covenants to protect of environmentally sensitive land against inappropriate use. The largest of these, in terms of total land area, is Bush Heritage Australia.

== History ==
The first European settlers of Australia had little regard for the environment of the continent and the early focus was to use the abundant resources and convert the environment into a less hostile and European setting to make settlers feel more at home. The first signs of the environmental movement in Australia began with the growing naturalism movement at the turn of the 19th century.

=== Early field naturalists ===
The first naturalists arrived in Australia very early. Joseph Banks, a botanist and naturalist, was a member of First voyage of James Cook and the First Fleet. Despite some significant discoveries by botanists such as Joseph Maiden it wasn't for many decades and with the rapid deterioration of native habitat and growing understanding of the native environment that the first organised clubs began to form. The Field Naturalists Club of Victoria was formed in 1880, followed shortly after by the New South Wales Naturalists Club and Field Naturalists Society of South Australia. A similar organisation was established in Tasmania in 1904. Despite the existence of a strong Victorian era zoological movement, there was little emphasis on conservation or management of the environment and in the early days these naturalists were primarily concerned with cataloguing and academia.

=== First national parks ===
The idea of land conservation began 1879, when the Royal National Park in Sydney was proclaimed. Previously it had been a recreational area; however, it followed the lead of Yellowstone National Park in the United States as a conservation park. As the conservation movement grew, so too did the number of national parks.

=== Response to endangered species ===
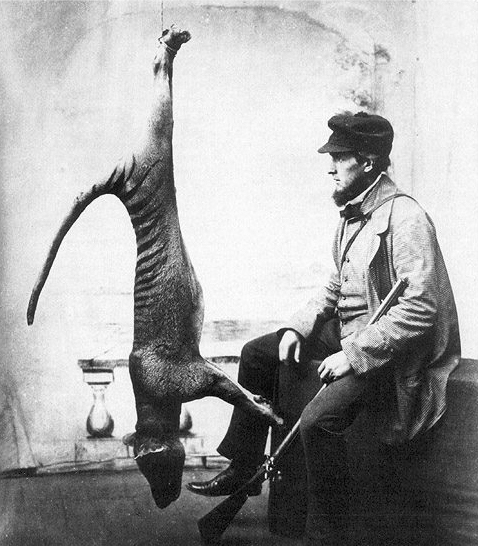
The thylacine, hunted to extinction in the wild by 1930, sparked public concern for other Australian mammals.

In 1908, the Victorian Naturalists Society and the Wilsons Promontory management committee were involved in advocating for the preservation of the thylacine, a species being hunted to extinction in Tasmania. Members of that group went on to establish Healesville Sanctuary. The environmental movement became mainstream with public outcry following extensive culling of koalas. Between 1915 and 1927, nearly 4 million koalas were killed, with the largest cullings occurring in Queensland. By 1924, koalas had officially become extinct in South Australia and endangered elsewhere. In response to the threat of extinction, Lone Pine Koala Sanctuary was opened.

Native fauna advisory committees began to be established to address the concern of rapidly dwindling populations of a number of mammal species. In 1928, the Tasmanian Advisory Committee for Native Fauna had recommended a reserve to protect any remaining thylacines, with potential sites of suitable habitat including the Arthur-Pieman area of western Tasmania. This was also the beginning of a Tasmanian wilderness movement. While the movement was started too late to save the thylacine from extinction, with the last thylacine dying in captivity in 1936, other species were saved with official protection orders. The koala was declared a protected species in all states in 1937. The Tasmanian devil, another iconic species hunted to the brink of extinction, was protected in 1941.

=== Landcare movement ===
While threats to iconic species stimulated the public to act, the conservation movement took some time to grow. Vast areas of Australia were set aside as crown land; however, these were seen as areas of potential development and land use rather than for conservation. Private land use was in general insensitive to native wildlife. The landcare movement in Australia was begun by farmers and has its roots in the 1960s to combat the growing problems of soil erosion and soil salinity which were having an increasing impact in Australia.

The movement later embraced benefits of native biodiversity. Groups of volunteers were formed for projects which promoted revegetation and better resource management. Many of these projects were funded by community groups such as the Returned Services Leagues and Rotary International, or official government programs, such as Land for Wildlife in Victoria or protection of remnant native vegetation through trusts and covenants. Having started locally, the landcare movement gained a national voice in the late 1980s with the foundation of Landcare and later Landcare Australia. Despite increasing awareness of greater environmental issues, however, a growing conflict was occurring between conservationists and farmers.

=== The anti-litter movement ===
The anti-litter movement also had its roots in the 1960s due to the growing problem in Australia of litter as a form of visual pollution. Keep Australia Beautiful, founder Dame Phyllis Frost saw the litter (cups, plastic bags, cans and bottles) strewn along the landscapes of Victoria and then sought the support of the National Council of Women, with a group of voluntary organisations and local government groups who were invited to join Australia's first anti-litter campaign. Initially named '§tate Wide Civic Pride' under the guidance of the Minister for Local Government R J Hamer, the group adopted the name 'Keep Australia Beautiful Council' and officially inaugurated the organisation in 1968.

Attracting public support from the Australian Prime Minister Gough Whitlam to the band ABBA supporting Keep Australia Beautiful's anti-litter campaigns, the organisation continues to campaign for a litter free and sustainable Australia. Their programs include the regional Tidy Towns Awards, the annual Keep Australia Beautiful Week, and other long standing education programs. Through litter auditing and government reporting the campaign aims to place responsibility on the corporate producers of waste.

=== The rise of the green movement ===
The first rumblings of the Australian green movement as a political force came with protests over the Lake Pedder damming project in 1972. The project gained worldwide publicity and brought the environmental movement to the mainstream in Australia. The movement escalated with the Franklin Dam project and Bob Brown was made a martyr for the cause when he was jailed for environmental activism.

The protests included the United Tasmania Group who were the precursor to the Tasmanian Greens and are now recognised as the world's first green party. The group that preceded the Tasmanian Wilderness Society, the South West Tasmania Action Committee, continued after the flooding. Another key development in the 1970s was the emergence of the Green Bans movement. In New South Wales the Builders Labourers' Federation, and allies such as the Federated Engine Drivers' and Firemens' Association, protected areas of urban bushland, alongside heritage sites, from clearing and demolition through the placement of work bans in support of community based campaigns.

=== Indigenous land ===
An increasing consciousness in Indigenous Australian culture and the practices of sustainable landcare also contributed to an overall increase in popularity of the environmental movement and concern for indigenous species. Additionally the Aboriginal Land Rights Act 1976 which granted indigenous people ownership based on traditional occupation, which effectively locked away large tracts of land from overdevelopment.

=== Late 20th century ===
The environmental movement reached a peak in Australia in the 1980s. Popular Australian culture began to embrace the environmental messages of rock bands like Midnight Oil. Blockades disrupting logging, mining, dredging, clearing and other environmentally destructive activities were increasingly undertaken throughout the 1980s and have become regularly used by campaigners.

The sinking of the Rainbow Warrior in New Zealand polarised the community on the green movement. Nuclear testing and whaling in the Pacific region had major impacts on the social consciousness of Australia. The environmental movement also became a hot political issue. The Australian Labor Party, in particular, began to capitalise on the popularity in its election campaigning with a national conservation and soil conservation strategy.

In July 1989, Bob Hawke made a famous "Our Country, Our Future" speech that the Australian Labor Party would plant a billion trees to combat soil erosion and declared the 1990s the "Decade of Landcare". In the same year, the government introduced the Industrial Chemicals Notification and Assessment Act 1989, the focus of which was to eliminate the use of chlorofluorocarbons. The widening hole in the ozone layer was of high concern due to Australia's growing rate of skin cancer incidence; however, with the shift to the Keating government the economy became the dominant issue and government environmental policy was not a mainstream political issue for over a decade.

=== 21st century ===
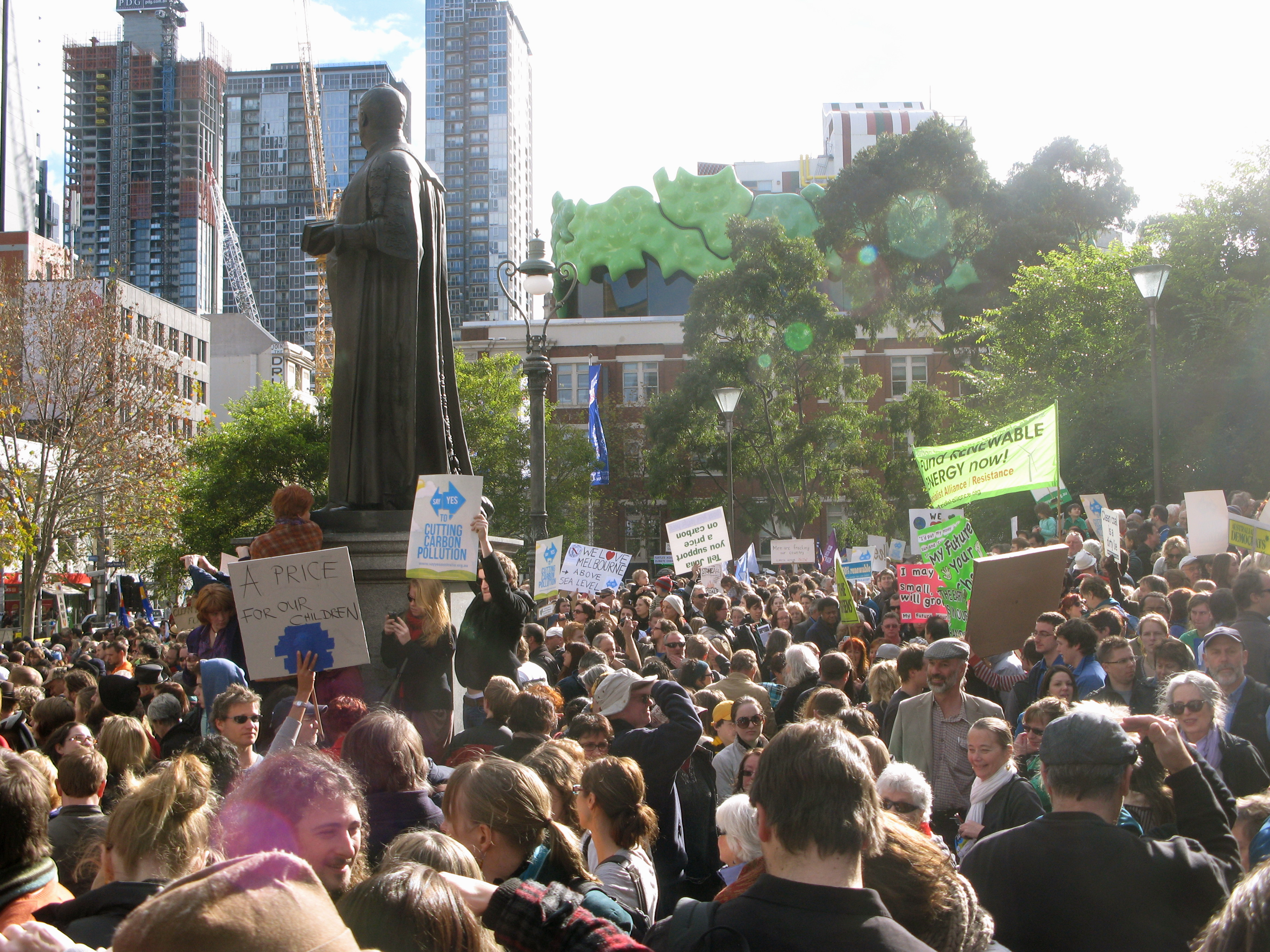
The 2011 Say Yes demonstrations were held in support of carbon pricing policies.

The 2000s Australian drought made climate change a more prominent issue at the turn of the century. A Newspoll released prior to the 2007 federal election found that the environment was the fourth most important issue to voters behind Medicare, education and the economy. At the grassroots level, Extinction Rebellion and School Strike for Climate were both active in Australia from the 2010s. Between 2010 and 2019, Australian environmental groups advertised over 24,000 events on Facebook. Grassroots climate change activism has continued into the 2020s with groups such as Rising Tide, Blockade Australia, and Disrupt Burrup Hub continuing to use disruptive tactics to challenge projects, gain media coverage, and recruit people to the movement.

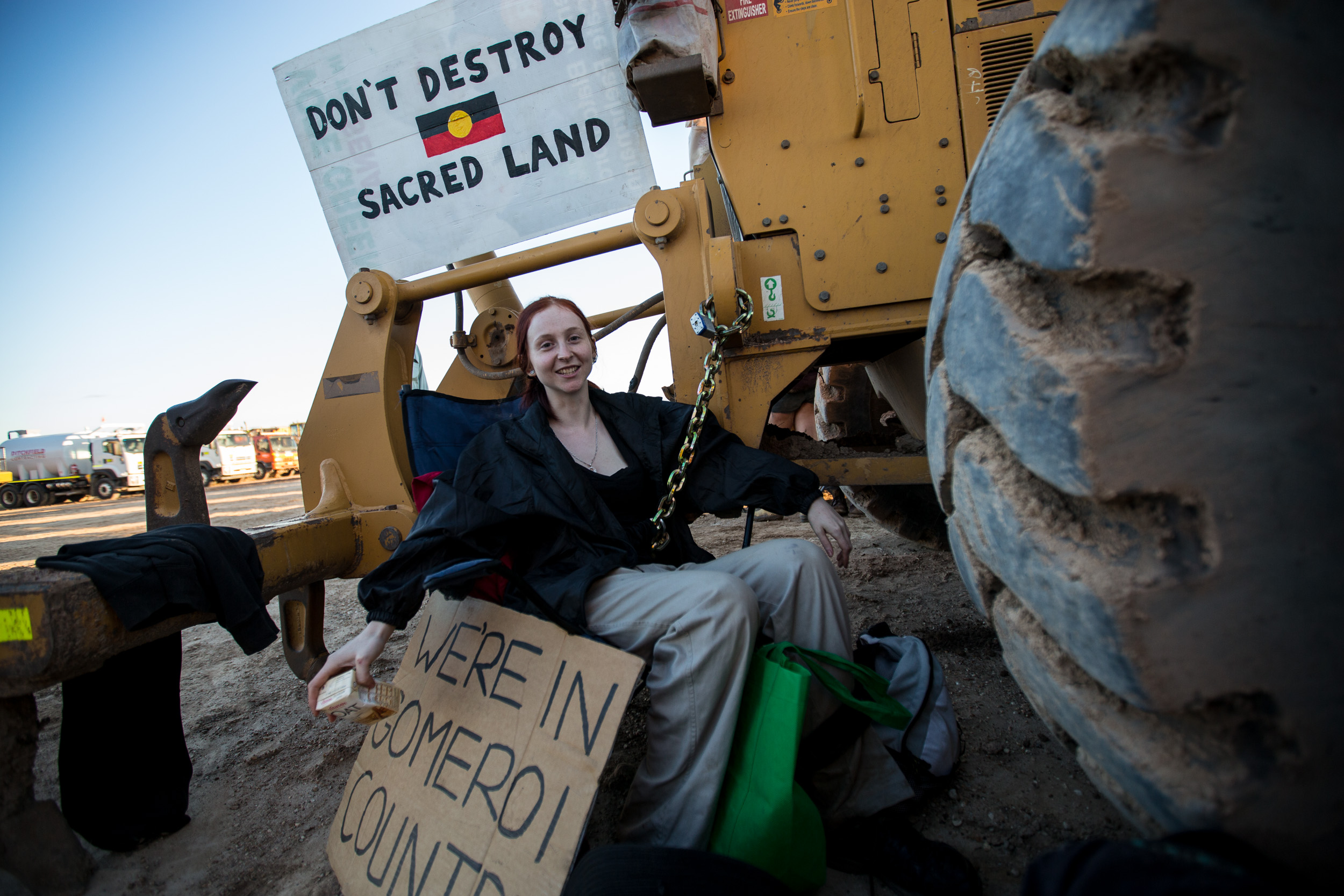
A protester at a lock-on in 2014 in opposition to a mine.

The governments of John Howard, Kevin Rudd and Julia Gillard all prioritised climate change policies such as carbon pricing and emissions trading schemes. Thousands of protesters joined Say Yes demonstrations in support of carbon pricing in 2011. However, the government of Tony Abbott opposed environmental policies and abolished a number of schemes after their 2013 federal election victory. Subsequent prime minister Malcolm Turnbull unsuccessfully proposed a National Energy Guarantee to address climate change and energy issues, but was also later removed as party leader due to opposition to it. His replacement, Scott Morrison, and his government were criticised for their response to the 2019–20 Australian bushfire season, which brought climate change to further popular attention. Environmental issues were a key political issue in the 2022 Australian federal election, where a loose alliance of "teal independent" candidates made addressing climate change a key campaign issue and won several seats from the incumbent Liberal coalition.

== Issues ==
=== Anti-nuclear movement ===
Nuclear testing, uranium mining and export, and nuclear power have often been the subject of public debate in Australia, and the anti-nuclear movement has a long history. Its origins date back to the 1972–73 debate over French nuclear testing in the Pacific and the 1976–77 debate about uranium mining in Australia.

Several groups specifically concerned with nuclear issues were established in the mid-1970s, including the Movement Against Uranium Mining and Campaign Against Nuclear Energy (CANE), cooperating with other environmental groups such as Friends of the Earth and the Australian Conservation Foundation. However, by the late 1980s, the price of uranium had fallen, and the costs of nuclear power had risen, and the anti-nuclear movement seemed to have won its case. CANE disbanded itself in 1988. New moves to expand uranium exports in the late 1990s and early 2000s gave rise to a new national movement, much of it focused on the successful campaign by the Mirrar people to prevent a mine being built at Jabiluka.

Since the 1990s, a number of campaigns by Aboriginal Traditional Owners and environmentalists have prevented nuclear waste dumps from being constructed. These have included sites located at Woomera, Wallerberdina and Kimba in South Australia and Muckaty in Northern Territory. Around 2003, proponents of nuclear power advocated it as a solution to global warming and the Australian government began taking an interest. Anti-nuclear campaigners and some scientists in Australia emphasised that nuclear power could not significantly substitute for other power sources, and that uranium mining itself could become a significant source of greenhouse gas emissions.

=== Climate change ===
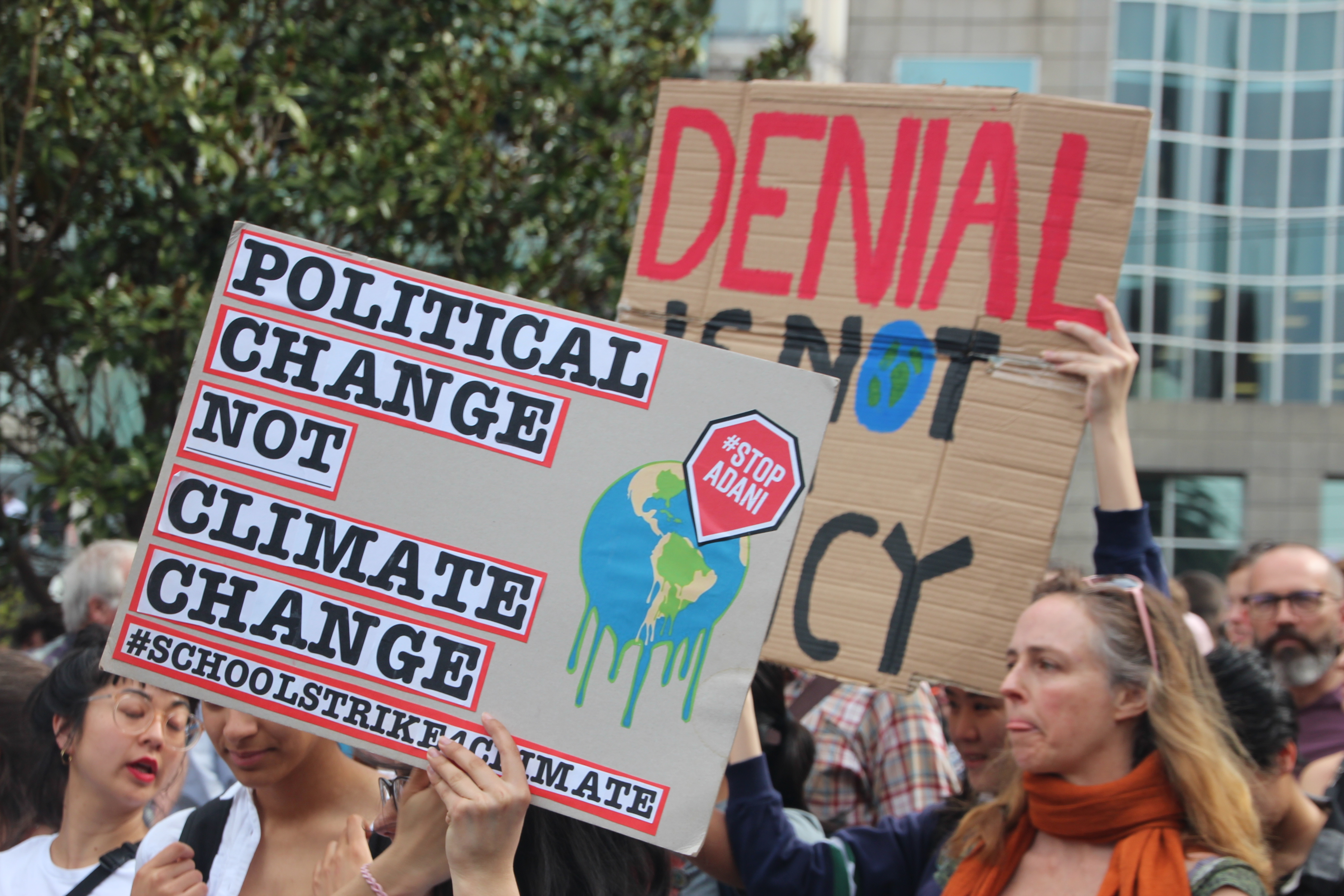
Melbourne Climate Strike, September 2019

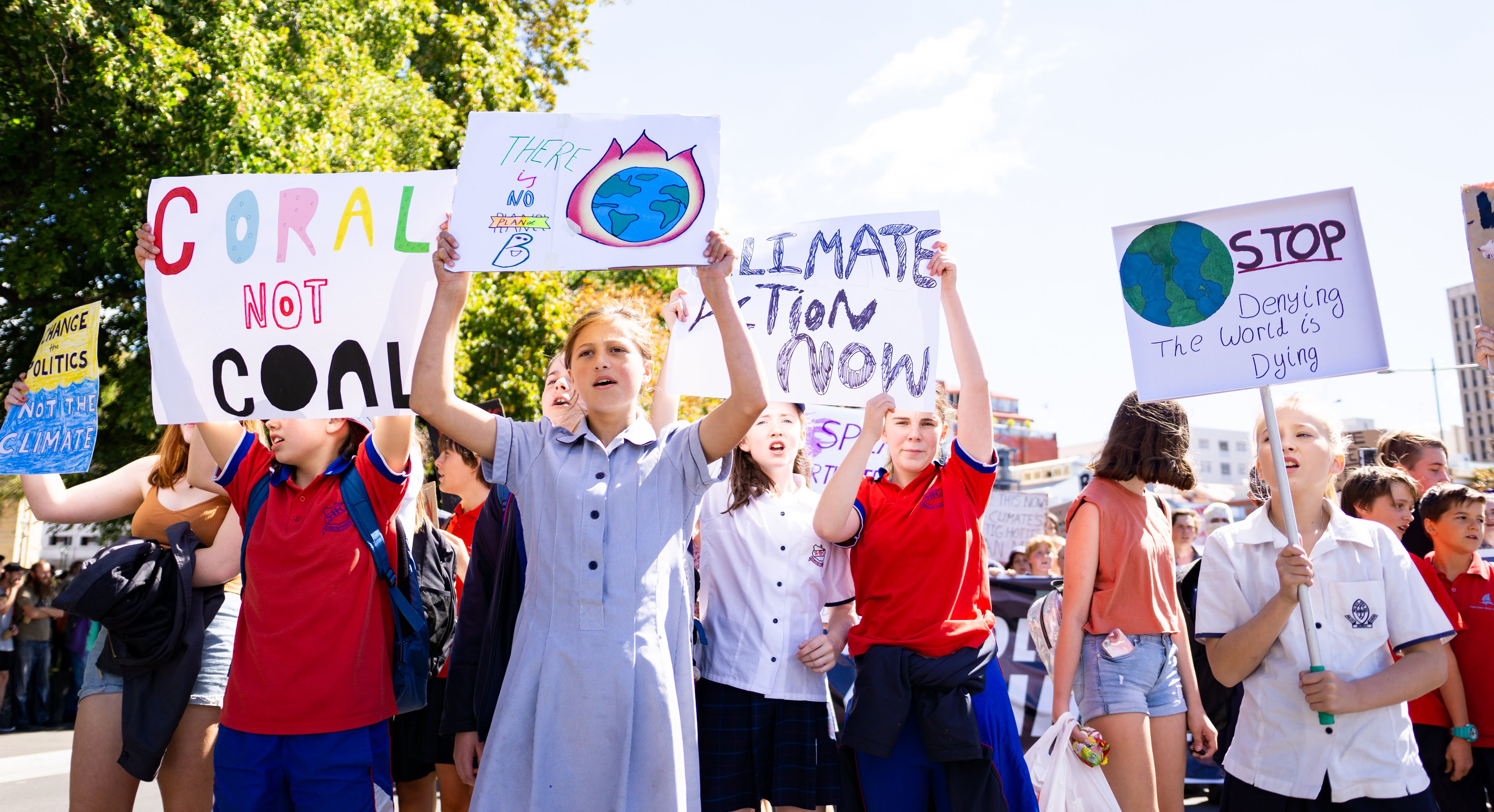
Protesters at a 2019 school strike for climate in Hobart.

Growing concern in Australia about climate change reached its peak in 2006, largely in response to climate change campaigner Al Gore's An Inconvenient Truth and once again pushed environmental issues to the forefront. The Howard government stirred the environmental movement by refusing to acknowledge the Kyoto Protocol and pushing a strongly pro-nuclear power stance. In addition, Howard created controversy by refusing to meet with Gore during his visit to Australia. In contrast, opposition leader Kevin Rudd proclaimed climate change as "the greatest moral, economic and social challenge of our time" and called for a cut to greenhouse gas emissions by 60% before 2050. The Rudd government began on 3 December 2007, and as his first official act after being sworn in, Kevin Rudd signed the Kyoto Protocol. Rudd stated that:

Australia's official declaration today that we will become a member of the Kyoto Protocol is a significant step forward in our country's efforts to fight climate change domestically – and with the international community.

The Rudd government's environmental credentials suffered some negative perception from environmental groups when post-Kyoto cuts to emissions were subsequently scaled back, and from the fallout of the public embarrassing Energy Efficient Homes Package scheme, which included the much criticized insulation and Green Loans programs. Criticism of government policy caused delays to the introduction of a Carbon Pollution Reduction Scheme including an abandoned emission trading scheme. It was finally replaced with the Gillard government's passed Clean Energy Bill 2011.

== Eco Warriors Flag ==
Eco Warriors Flag

The Eco Warriors Flag originated in Australia during the late 1990s. It is a symbol for worldwide cultural change. The Eco Warriors Flag has four colours. Red / yellow / black are colours from the Australian Aboriginal flag. Representing indigenous cultures worldwide and the beginnings of all humanity. Green represents nature and the environmental movement. In the centre of the flag is tripod symbol, which represents unity.

== See also ==
- Conservation in Australia
- Fusion Party
- The Kettering Incident, a TV series filmed in Tasmania
- List of Australian environmental books
- Sustainable Australia Party
