= Leila Deen =

British environmental activist

Leila Deen (born 1979) is a British environmental activist, campaigning on the issues of climate change, poverty and water politics. She is the founder and CEO of the Secure Energy Project, having previously been program director at SumOfUs, and led Greenpeace UK's campaign against fracking. She was also projects director with Greenpeace USA until 2019. She was previously an activist with the World Development Movement and Plane Stupid. She is most widely known for pouring green custard on the then Business Secretary Peter Mandelson in March 2009 in protest against the extension of Heathrow Airport, for which she was arrested and cautioned.

== Activism ==
Deen has been an activist since she was a teenager. Deen was a prominent member of anti-aviation group Plane Stupid and a campaigner for the World Development Movement, focusing on water, finance, and climate change. Deen made headlines in 2005 as part of a protest at the G8 meeting in Edinburgh when she scaled a crane along with two other protesters. She was quoted as saying "The crumbs of debt relief and aid increases... remain tied to debilitating conditions, which stands in direct contradiction to Make Poverty History".

In contrast to her later direct action, at the 2008 Kingsnorth Climate Camp Deen was reported to be "keen to stress that WDM does not support illegal protest methods". She has called Heathrow's Terminal 5 "a glorified shopping mall" and she called pro-flight counter-protesters "very misguided". In 2007 she joined Brian Haw's peace camp in Parliament Square against SOCPA and the Iraq War.

As a member of Plane Stupid, she dressed as a suffragette, glued herself to the doors of the Department for Transport, and blew an airhorn to interrupt a speech by Geoff Hoon. She was a finalist in the Sheila McKechnie Awards in 2006 for campaigning for Economic Justice.

With Greenpeace UK from 2010 to 2013 she was an energy campaigner, leading their opposition to fracking, running their "How clean is your cloud" campaign against the use of coal energy by internet companies, and campaigning against Arctic and deep-water oil drilling by Shell, Gazprom and other energy companies, including on board Greenpeace's MV Esperanza ship. In October 2013, she became Deputy Campaigns Director with Greenpeace USA.

=== Peter Mandelson Incident ===
Democracy has failed us. It's direct action, and direct action historically has been a major way that we have got change. You can look back historically through the suffragettes, through the miner strikes, through all of the major changes. It's about putting yourself in the way.

— Leila Deen

On 6 March 2009 Deen approached Business Secretary Peter Mandelson outside a Low Carbon summit on the government's carbon strategy at the Royal Society and threw a cup of green custard in his face, in protest over his support for a third runway at Heathrow airport. Deen lived along a Heathrow flight path in London, and had previously argued that airport expansion was incompatible with stopping climate change. She was quoted as saying "the only thing green about Peter Mandelson is the slime coursing through his veins." Plane Stupid claimed that the action was in protest at the frequent meetings between BAA's Roland Rudd and Mandelson and other ministers ahead of Labour's approval of a third runway.

Mandelson responded that "Whilst I'm prepared to take my fair share of the green revolution on to my shoulders, I'm less keen on having it on my face", and John Prescott said that "What is totally unacceptable is the way the woman walked away claiming it was her right in democracy. She should have been arrested. It is not acceptable that she should be allowed to walk away." Mandelson noted that "I was slightly surprised that she could just saunter off without being apprehended". Deen was arrested on 8 March over the incident, and was cautioned on 9 April for causing "harassment, alarm or distress".

== Journalism ==
Deen wanted to be a journalist when she was in her teens. Deen has written for New Statesman about the 2007 G8 summit, for Red Pepper about the 2003 anti-war protests at RAF Fairford and for The Independent. In the Guardian ahead of the G-20 protests, Deen argued that the green movement is strong as it relies on networks, built through baking cakes and making bunting rather than on violence and confronting police lines.

== Personal life ==
Deen went to school in Brighton. She is half-Egyptian, and is also known as Leila Aly-el-Deen. Her mother Sheila is a primary school teacher and Greenpeace member. Leila studied development studies and politics at Leeds University, where she voted in favour of banning The Sun newspaper from shops in the Students' Union in protest at its coverage of immigration and asylum issues. She subsequently received a master's degree from Sussex University.

== See also ==
- Environmental direct action in the United Kingdom
- Pieing
