= Climate Rush =

UK Climate Change public body

- Purpose: Environmentalism
- Region served: UK
- Method: Nonviolence and direct action
- Website: climaterush.co.uk

Climate Rush is a UK organisation that campaigns on various environmental issues related to climate change. Their website states that, "We are a diverse group of women and men who are determined to raise awareness of the biggest threat facing humanity today - that of Climate Change". The organisation was founded in October 2008 by a group of eleven women, including Tamsin Omond. They have organised various protests using direct action to highlight their cause. They model their actions on those of the suffragettes who campaigned a century ago to gain women the right to vote. Members of the Women's Institute have campaigned alongside members of the organisation.

== Protests ==
=== The Climate Rush, 13 October 2008 ===
On 13 October 2008 Climate Rush held a rally in Parliament Square to celebrate the anniversary of the Suffragette Rush on Parliament. Protesters wanted Parliament to take action on climate change. Three days later Ed Miliband, Secretary for Energy and Climate Change, reformed climate policy pledging in the Climate Change Bill to cut UK emissions by 80 per cent by 2050.

=== Climate Rush Hits Heathrow, 12 January 2009 ===
On 12 January 2009, two days before the government gave the go ahead for a third runway at Heathrow, Climate Rush held a sit-in dinner at domestic departures, Terminal One. The new runway would have made Heathrow the largest carbon emitter in the UK. Over 700 Climate Suffragettes protested in the terminal.

=== Climate Rush Gets Chained to Parliament, 28 January 2009 ===
On the day that the Houses of Parliament were debating the expansion of Heathrow Airport, ten climate suffragettes went armed with chains to the gates of Westminster. Their aim was to create a visible protest that would be impossible to ignore. Climate rush wanted the politicians to notice them as a group of activists who were so concerned about climate change that they would risk arrest as they walked into the Houses of Parliament to hold a debate about the climate impact of Heathrow. They were joined, last minute, by a pensioner from Twickenham who frustrated with writing to her MP and going on marches had decided to take a step further and engage in civil disobedience.

=== Climate Rush Host 'No New Coal Awards', 26 February 2009 ===
On the evening of the UK COAL AWARDS held at the Landmark Hotel in London, Climate Rush decided to disrupt the event. They publicised that they would be holding their own NO NEW COAL AWARDS at the same hotel at the same time. The UK COAL AWARDS decided to cancel their event, costing them at least £5000, and relocate to another venue. The Landmark Hotel pledged never to hold the award ceremony again.

=== Climate Rush Closes RBS HQ, 5 March 2009 ===
In the week when Fred "the Shred" Goodwin, CEO of a nationalised Royal Bank of Scotland, declined to give up his £16 million pension, Climate Rush decided to hold a party outside RBS HQ. The Royal Bank of Scotland prides itself on being 'the oil and gas bank', investing more in high carbon industry than any other UK bank. Climate Rush held a street party outside their London head offices forcing them to shut their doors for two hours and hindering the smooth running of their business. Their protest was reported in the Financial Times, signalling to big business that protests will be mounted against banks propped up by taxpayers, that continue to support the biggest carbon emitters.

=== Climate Rush Parliament Glue-On, 27 April 2009 ===
Climate Rush take inspiration from the Suffragettes so to mark the centenary of Marjory Hume's chaining herself to a statue in Parliament four climate suffragettes glued themselves around the same statue. It was four days after Ed Miliband declared his plan to invest in a new generation of coal-fired power stations, his answer to energy insecurity problems. The suffragettes spent two hours glued around the statue talking about the need for truly clean air.

=== Climate Rush: Bike Rush, 1 June 2009 ===
On the first day of the UN Climate Summit in Bonn over 600 climate Suffragettes mounted their bikes and took over central London. As international leaders were discussing what to put on the agenda for the UN Climate Summit in Copenhagen they were proving to politicians that there is a public mandate for action on climate change. They took a tour of climate criminals whose offices are based in central London, BP, BAA, Shell, Unilever, before congregating on Westminster Bridge, just under Big Ben. They managed to close the bridge for over an hour whilst they unfurled picnic blankets, listened to a ceilidh band, climbed on Boudica's statue and dropped banners proclaiming – DEEDS NOT WORDS.

=== Climate Rush: Love Life, Hate Palm Oil, 1 July 2009 ===
On the eve of the largest Agro-fuels investment conference Climate Rush decided to rush the hotel where the major investors in agro-fuels were holding their gala dinner. They pledged to have a protesting presence at any conference that was pushing false solutions, such as unsustainable agro-fuels, to climate change. Climate Rush felt that if they were to stand a chance of stopping runaway climate change then they must protect the largest carbon sink, the world's rainforests, rather than chopping them up to get rich by planting agro-fuels.

=== Climate Rush at Mandelson's house ===
In August 2009 protestors campaigning against the closure of a wind turbine factory chained themselves to the house of the Secretary of State for Business, Innovation and Skills, Peter Mandelson. They demanded that the government invests more in green technology.

=== Climate Rush: country tour ===
Several campaigners from the group set out on a month-long tour around the country, at the end of the month, to spread the message of their organisation.

=== Climate Rush: Jeremy Clarkson ===
In September 2009 seven campaigners dumped horse manure on Jeremy Clarkson's driveway and held a banner saying, "This is what you're landing us in". They said that they targeted him because of his blasé attitude towards climate change. Clarkson responded by saying that "People are bored of climate change" and that they prefer to watch the television series, Top Gear, that he presents, than hear about issues related to climate change. He later called the protestors "silly little girls".

=== The Great Climate Swoop, October 2009 ===
In October 2009, a thousand activists from Climate Camp, Plane Stupid and Climate Rush descended on Ratcliffe-on-Soar coal fired power station, shutting down the turbines for over 24 hours and saving the planet tonnes of CO_{2}. They provided a troop of climate suffragettes for the 'footsteps to the future' block, distracting the police while several hundred others took down the fences.

=== Love Opera, Hate Oil Spills ===
As BP spent the summer of 2010 trying to clean up its image by sponsoring arts, a group of climate suffragettes went to the opera (a live screening from the Royal Opera house in Trafalgar square) to remind the crowd, and the company, that its reckless actions wouldn't be forgotten with a climate rush banner.

=== Climate Viagra, 16 September 2010 ===
On 16 September 2010, six Climate Rush activists delivered a prop to the home of Nick Clegg, then leader of the Liberal Democrats, the day before the party's annual conference, calling on him to prioritise climate change policy.

=== Climate Rush storm the Daily Express, 7 October 2010 ===
Three women from Climate Rush stormed the Daily Express newsroom after they had published climate change denying articles against the scientific consensus of the validity of anthropomorphic climate change. Once inside the newsroom the climate suffragettes handed out cards with information on climate change before leaving peacefully.

=== Climate 'Banksy', 25 October 2010 ===
Three women and one man arrived at the Treasury and jumped off their bikes. They took spray cans from their bags and graffitied an image of Chancellor George Osborne next to his own words: 'A CONSERVATIVE TREASURY WILL DRIVE GREEN GROWTH... BY FINANCING A GREEN RECOVERY'. The stencil was approximately 2 x 0.8 metres and positioned under the stone by the entrance on which 'HM Treasury' is chiselled out.

=== Climate Rush vigil in memory of the Suffragettes, 18 November 2010 ===
On 18 November 1910, known as Black Friday 300 Suffragettes were met by 5000 police officers. Over a hundred Suffragettes were arrested, they were brutally treated, sexually assaulted and trampled. Climate Rush held a silent vigil in memory of these brave and inspiring women. Both Helen and Laura Pankhurst – the granddaughter and great-granddaughter of Sylvia Pankhurst made it over the fence so that they might lay the wreath at the foot of the statue of their ancestor.

Five days before the centenary of Black Friday, four artists from the Suffragette-inspired group took a stencil and spray cans to publicise the vigil. The stencil read 'Remember the Suffragettes – 18 November 2010' and has been sprayed in sites across London, including Buckingham Palace, the National Gallery, Hyde Park Corner and Holloway Prison, chosen for their historical connections to the Suffragettes.

=== CRDA visits N1, 23 December 2010 ===
On the night of 22 December as part of the ongoing campaign to raise awareness of the carbon emissions, of ‘Chelsea Tractors' the CRDA – Climate Rush Driving Authority – paid a flying visit to London borough of Islington, during which approximately 50 4×4 'Islington Tractors' had their license plates replaced with the 'CO2 K1LL5'.

== See also ==
- Camp for Climate Action
- Environmental direct action in the United Kingdom
- List of environmental protests
- Plane Stupid
