= Mountain Valley Pipeline =

Natural gas pipeline in the United States

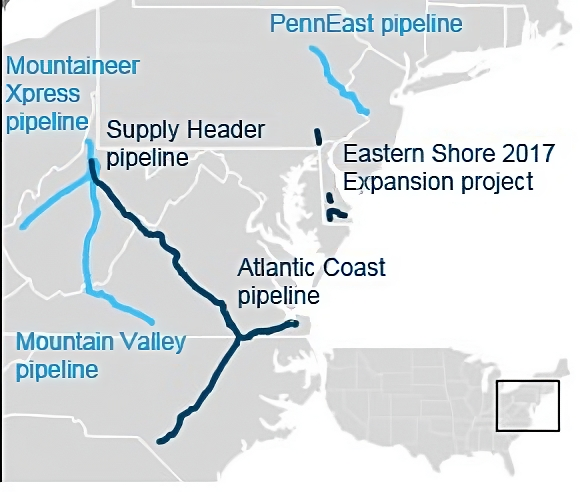
Potential pipelines under review by the Federal Energy Regulatory Commission, including the Mountain Valley Pipeline

The Mountain Valley Pipeline (MVP) is an operating natural gas pipeline running from northwestern West Virginia to southern Virginia. The MVP is 303 miles (488 km) long, and there is also a proposed Southgate Extension which will run 75 miles (121 km) from Virginia into North Carolina. The completed pipeline has a capacity of 2 million dekatherms (Dths) of natural gas per day (approximately 200 TWh per year), with gas produced from the Marcellus and Utica shale formations.

The pipeline was met with opposition in the form of legal challenges, regulatory hurdles, direct action and destruction of property. Some of the issues raised by opponents include the seizure of land through eminent domain and negative impacts to the forests, waterways, and protected wildlife. Opponents have also voiced concerns about the project's contribution to climate change, and permits have been denied on the basis of environmental justice laws in the state of Virginia. These challenges have resulted in the project being years behind schedule and billions of dollars over budget.

The American Petroleum Institute stated that the pipeline would get a cleaner, cost-effective fuel to market and spur the economy.

In July 2022, West Virginia senator Joe Manchin negotiated with US Democratic Party leadership to ease regulatory barriers for major infrastructure projects in exchange for his support of the Inflation Reduction Act. His proposed legislation would have required the Federal Energy Regulatory Commission (FERC) to take "all necessary actions" to ensure completion of the MVP. This deal prompted protests in Washington, DC in September, led by Indigenous people and others voicing environmental justice concerns. Manchin's bill was later withdrawn.

On June 3, 2023, President Biden signed into law the Fiscal Responsibility Act that requires all federal permits needed to complete the project be issued by June 24, 2023. The pipeline entered service on June 14, 2024.

== Project description ==
The MVP project is a natural gas pipeline from northwestern West Virginia to southern Virginia receiving its supply from the Marcellus and Utica shale sites. It is able to provide up to two billion cubic feet of firm capacity per day. The pipeline spans approximately 303 miles (488 km), and its route crosses the Appalachian Trail near Peters Mountain Wilderness in Virginia.

The MVP is owned by Mountain Valley Pipeline, LLC (MVP LLC), which is a joint venture between Equitrans Midstream, NextEra Energy Resources, Con Edison Transmission and other midstream partners. The MVP would be operated by Equitrans Midstream which is the majority owner. Equitrans Midstream was formed in a June 2020 merger.

The MVP is an interstate pipeline so it is federally regulated by the Federal Energy Regulatory Commission under United States Natural Gas Act. State level ordinances also apply. In October 2015, MVP LLC applied for permits for the pipeline from FERC, and the regulatory commission issued the Final Environmental Impact Statement in June 2017. The pipeline's operation would be regulated by the Pipeline and Hazardous Materials Safety Administration (PHMSA).

The evidence of a market demand and Federal Energy Regulatory Commission (FERC) Certificate policy requires at least 25 percent of the Mountain Valley Pipeline's capacity to deliver natural gas be met by service contract agreements in order to justify the need for the project. MVP LLC was able to secure these service contracts allowing them to proceed with the proposed project. The completed pipeline would have the ability to ship 2 million dekatherms (Dts) of natural gas per day for distribution, with a large quantity of that gas being produced from the Marcellus and Utica shale formations.

== Opposition to the project ==
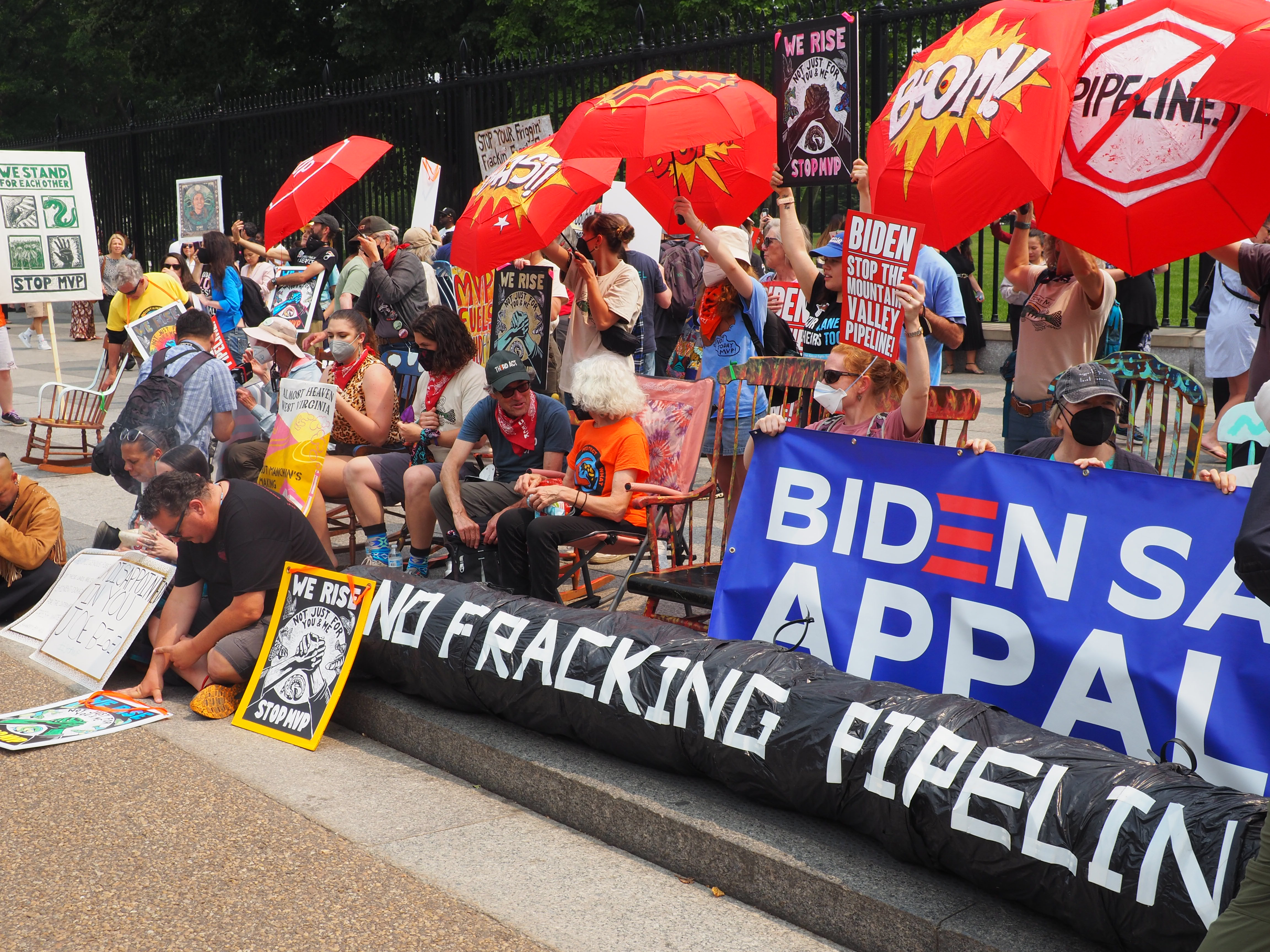
Protest against the Mountain Valley Pipeline in Washington, D.C. in June 2023

Opposition was met during the initial request to obtain a certificate of convenience and necessity from the FERC. Some of the issues raised by citizen groups include the right of eminent domain and the potential for negative impacts to the forests, waterways, and protected wildlife during construction. Concerns were raised because the route cuts across the Appalachian Trail. Activists have set up numerous blockades to prevent construction along the pipeline path including a month-long tree-sit near Peters Mountain, an aerial blockade in which a woman occupied a platform atop a pole for 57 days, other aerial blockades, and the 932 day yellow finch tree-sit from September 2018 to March 2021. Protestors have also blocked construction by parking junk cars on the pipeline route or locking themselves to machinery; in one case, a professor chained herself to construction equipment. Obstruction of pipeline construction has been ongoing in spite of significant criminal and civil penalties being levied against protestors.

The head of the Jefferson National Forest was reassigned, allegedly due to heavy handed tactics involving the protest, which included running ATVs on a section of the Appalachian Trail, and, according to Outside magazine, blocking food and water supplies to protesters. In Virginia, bumper stickers are appearing on cars that read "No Pipeline". Many articles against the pipeline have been published in The Roanoke Times, and many protests have been organized.

The MVP has been cited by government agencies for violations of Virginia's Stormwater Management Act because of problems with runoff from land clearing while installing the pipeline. The pipeline was challenged in court, including lawsuits during 2018 in which cultural preservation officers from the Rosebud Sioux Tribe and the Cheyenne River Sioux Tribe sued FERC for failing to satisfy the requirements of the National Historic Preservation Act after they found evidence of burial mounds along the path of the pipeline. These lawsuits were thrown out by federal courts in February 2019.

Many landowners complain that they are kept up at night by construction, mainly because most of the land used to build the pipeline was taken from private landowners by eminent domain. A ruling by U.S. District Court Judge Elizabeth Dillon on January 31, 2018, granted the right of eminent domain to MVP LLC in a disputed area but required current appraisals and bonds be set forth to compensate for any losses incurred by the land owners.

Landowners located along the pipeline project see the privately owned pipeline as a "government sanctioned land grab" impacting not only the environment, but also the local economies of surrounding towns. In June 2018, a federal court put a hold on a required permit for construction of the pipeline in Monroe County, West Virginia.

Compressor stations that were proposed as part of the Southgate extension were denied permits in Virginia in 2021 when state regulators ruled that the permits would violate state environmental justice laws. Residents were concerned about noise, pollution, and the danger of explosions.

For members of native tribes, there are social concerns associated with the continued construction of the pipeline. Female members of the Occaneechi and the Monacan nations have voiced concerns about the potential violence from "man camps" that would be accompany the pipeline construction.

== Impacts ==
The American Petroleum Institute stated that the pipeline would get a cleaner, cheaper fuel to market and spur the economy. There are concerns however from communities that will be impacted by the pipeline's construction and from groups who want to preserve historical landmarks, forests, wildlife, waterways, and parks. Questions were raised regarding the need for the project and its purpose. Additional inquiries called in to question whether there were alternatives to avoid impacts to the forest among other things which were detailed in the Final Environmental Impact Statement, along with recommendations by the FERC to minimize the impacts on the environment.

The environmental concerns of the pipeline include threats to the streams, rivers, and drinking water along the route. This can include the forests, endangered species, fish nurseries, and the public lands that surround the pipeline. Water contamination has been one of the biggest concerns with the growth of this project, and there are concerns by some about the path of the pipeline, which cuts across sections of national forests including the Jefferson National Forest in Virginia and West Virginia along with the Appalachian Trail.

Environmental impacts and pollution also infringe on the traditional and cultural practices of the Indigenous people who are tied to the land the pipeline is being built on. These practices are protected by the Declaration on the Rights of Indigenous Peoples.

The Appalachian Trail Conservancy has opposed the pipeline, with the following concerns:

- The permanent damage of the scenic landscape of the Appalachian trail
- Concerns for nearby towns due to the lands being picked for the building of the pipeline are most susceptible to soil erosion, landslides, and natural gas leaks
- In order to push for the building of the MVP, the Forest Service lowered their standard for water quality, visual impacts, and destruction of the forest within the Jefferson National Forest Management Plan. There is a concern that due to this change, there could be an increase in private companies taking advantage of National Parks or forests

The Natural Resources Defense Council, an environmental advocacy group, says:

- Private landowners near the pipeline will lose property to the pipeline company. If the landowners are able to keep their land, the property value will decrease due to the pipeline's presence. Due to the process of eminent domain, the ability for the government to attain private land and make it public land, landowners could have their land taken and given to pipeline companies.
- Consumers of the pipeline will have to pay additional taxes in their electrical bills to pay for the building of the Mountain Valley Pipeline
- Loss of ecosystem service value due to the destruction of the water purification and recreational benefits of the land.

== Timeline ==
=== 2014-2019 ===
June 12, 2014

- A non-binding open season for the MVP project commences June 12, 2014, and will extend through July 10, 2014. An open season provides all market participants – producers, marketers, industrials, and local distribution companies – the opportunity to subscribe for capacity on the MVP.

October 2014

- MVP LLC began the voluntary pre-filing process with the Federal Energy Regulatory Commission (FERC)

October 23, 2015

- MVP LLC filed formal application with FERC targeting an in-service date of late 2018

October 13, 2017

- FERC issues MVP LLC a Certificate of Public Convenience and Necessity and Environmental Impact Statement (EIS)

December 2017

- Virginia State Water Control Board issues Water Quality Certification for the Mountain Valley Pipeline

December 20, 2017

- The Bureau of Land Management issued a Rule of Decision granting MVP LLC an operational right of way through the Jefferson National Forest, and adopted the EIS

December 22, 2017

- The U.S. Army Corps of Engineers verified that the Mountain Valley Pipeline project meets the criteria of the Nationwide Permit 12.

January 31, 2018

- U.S. District Court Judge Elizabeth Dillon granted the right of eminent domain to MVP LLC in a disputed area but required current appraisals and bonds be set forth to compensate for any losses incurred by the land owners.

2018 (first quarter)

- Construction began, projected in-service date of the fourth quarter of 2019

July 3, 2018

- The U.S. Army Corps of Engineers reinstated their December 22 verification that the pipeline project complies with the Nationwide Permit 12, with several "special conditions". One notable condition states that river crossings were to be constructed using dry open-cut construction in order to minimize environmental damage.

July 27, 2018

- The 4th Circuit Court of Appeals annulled MVP LLC's right of way through federal land, which was originally granted by the Bureau of Land Management. It was annulled on the basis of failing to comply with the National Environmental Policy Act, the National Forest Management Act and the Mineral Leasing Act.

October 2, 2018

- The 4th Circuit Court of Appeals struck down Nationwide Permit 12, which was issued by the U.S. Army Corps of Engineers' Huntington District. The court found that the permit overlooked a requirement by West Virginia regulators that pipeline stream crossings must be completed within 72 hours to limit environmental harm.

November 27, 2018

- The 4th Circuit Court of Appeals elaborated on their October 2 decision regarding the Nationwide Permit 12, concluding that West Virginia did not follow the federally mandated notice-and-comment procedures for waiving special conditions part of the permit.

December 2018

- Virginia files suit against MVP LLC for "violations of the commonwealth's environmental laws and regulations at sites in Craig, Franklin, Giles, Montgomery, and Roanoke Counties."

March 1, 2019

- Virginia State Water Control Board decided they do not have the authority to revoke the water quality certification.

October 11, 2019

- The 4th Circuit Appeals Court rescinds the Biological Opinion and Incidental Take Statement issued by the U.S. Fish and Wildlife Service
- Virginia issued a statement forcing MVP LLC to submit to court-ordered and court-supervised compliance with environmental protections, imposing additional layers of independent, third-party monitoring on the project, and requiring the payment of a significant $2.15 million civil penalty. This agreement between Virginia and MVP LLC resolved the lawsuit Virginia filed against MVP LLC in December 2018.

October 15, 2019

- FERC ordered all work on MVP stop except stabilization and restoration activities

=== 2020-Present ===
June 2020

- MVP project is approximately 92% complete, in-service date revised to early 2021

July 31, 2020

- Trinity Energy Services, a contractor of MVP LLC, filed a lawsuit in West Virginia demanding enforcement of a mechanic's lien. Trinity claimed it was owed $102.4 million. If a court enforced the lien, MVP LLC would be required to sell the pipeline at auction. Three weeks later, Trinity Energy filed a $103.8 million lawsuit against MVP LLC in Pennsylvania, claiming breach of contract, failure to pay, and enforcement of a mechanics' lien.

August 11, 2020

- The North Carolina Department of Environmental Quality's Division of Water Resources denied MVP LLC's request for a 401 Water Quality Certification and Jordan Lake Riparian Buffer Authorization for the Southgate extension of the Mountain Valley Pipeline. The Division determined that the extension could lead to "unnecessary water quality impacts and disturbance of the environment in North Carolina."
- Secretary Michael S. Regan issued statement on the Department of Environmental Quality's decision, saying of the MVP, "This has always been an unnecessary project that poses unnecessary risks to our environment and given the uncertain future of the MVP Mainline, North Carolinians should not be exposed to the risk of another incomplete pipeline project."

August 25, 2020

- MVP LLC applied to FERC for a two-year extension of Certificate for Public Convenience and Necessity (had expiration date in mid October). Certificate is required for interstate pipeline construction.

September 4, 2020

- Federal regulators ruled that the pipeline would not jeopardize any of the five endangered or threatened species known to live in its path, reinstating the U.S. Fish and Wildlife Service Biological Opinion and Incidental Take Statement.

September 11, 2020

- U.S. Army Corps of Engineers reissued three permits (two years after being invalidated by federal appeals court), approving a path across almost 1,000 streams and wetlands.

September 22, 2020

- MVP LLC requested that FERC lift the stop work order (issued October 15) by September 25.

October 9, 2020

- FERC extended the Certificate of Public Convenience and Necessity for the Mountain Valley Pipeline.

February 21, 2022

- NextEra Energy wrote off its investment in the pipeline, saying that "continued legal and regulatory challenges have resulted in a very low probability of pipeline completion". They took a $800 million impairment charge.

July 27, 2022

- Senator Joe Manchin III (D-West Virginia) secured an agreement from Democratic leaders of the U.S. Senate and the Biden administration which would move completion of the pipeline forward. The agreement, to be included in major climate and tax legislation, "would ensure that federal agencies 'take all necessary actions to permit the construction and operation' of the gas line". The legislation ensures that future legal challenges to the pipeline will be heard by the United States Court of Appeals for the District of Columbia Circuit in the future.

September 8, 2022

- Manchin's deal with Democratic leadership prompted protests in Washington, DC led by Indigenous people and others voicing environmental justice concerns.

May 31, 2023

- As part of the Fiscal Responsibility Act of 2023, getting a federal permit for energy projects was made easier, thus allowing the MVP to move along

June 1, 2023

- During Senate votes on the Fiscal Responsibility Act of 2023, Senator Tim Kaine (D-Virginia) moved to remove the permitting provision. It failed to be removed under a 30-69 vote

June 3, 2023

- On June 3, 2023, President Biden signed into law the Fiscal Responsibility Act that requires all federal permits needed to complete the project be issued by June 24, 2023.

July 9, 2023

- FERC approves resuming construction on the MVP, with an estimated finish by the end of 2023. The estimated total cost of the project had risen to $6.6 billion, up from a 2018 estimate of $3.5 billion.

July 10, 2023

- The U.S. Court of Appeals for the 4th Circuit blocked construction of the pipeline through the Jefferson National Forest until other courts finish reviewing decisions made by the Department of the Interior concerning construction in that forest. The rest of the pipeline's construction remains unaffected. Senators Manchin and Capito of West Virginia voiced opposition to the decision as the Fiscal Responsibility Act stripped the 4th Circuit of its jurisdiction over the pipeline.

July 24, 2023

- Patrick Morrissey (R-West Virginia), the Attorney General of West Virginia, filed a brief to have the Supreme Court lift the "stay in connection with parallel litigation alleging the pipeline would violate the Endangered Species Act".

July 27, 2023

- The United States Supreme Court struck down the 4th Circuit Court of Appeals ruling of July 10, 2023, that blocked construction of the 303-mile Mountain Valley Pipeline from proceeding. Senator Manchin stated that he was "relieved that the highest court in the land has upheld the law Congress passed and the President signed."

August 8, 2023

- The United States Court of Appeals for the Fourth Circuit ruled that Congress, in enacting the Fiscal Responsibility Act of 2023, had stripped it of jurisdiction to consider any further litigation relating to the pipeline. The court also held that, because Congress had ratified agency action relating to the pipeline, the legal dispute over whether it complies with federal laws is moot.

June 11, 2024

- Operations for the pipeline were given the okay by the Federal Energy Regulation Committee. This allowed the pipeline to begin flowing gas and be put in service.

June 14, 2024

The pipeline entered into service.

February 4, 2025

- The Mountain Valley Pipeline Company filed an application to continue the project into North Carolina. This extension would result in the construction of 31 miles of pipeline.
