= Yellow Finch tree sit =

Blockade against Mountain Valley Pipeline

The Yellow Finch tree sit was an aerial blockade in Montgomery County, Virginia against the Mountain Valley Pipeline (MVP). The blockade lasted 932 days from September 5, 2018, until March 24, 2021. Participants in the blockade have claimed that it is the longest continuous aerial blockade in the United States. Activists rotated in and out of the trees and were supported by teams on the ground providing food and supplies. A court-issued injunction in November 2020 removed the ground encampment. A representative from MVP stated in November 2020 that the blockade had cost the company $213,000 in delays and security expenses.

== Background ==
The Mountain Valley Pipeline is a 42-inch, 303-mile underground natural gas pipeline under construction in the United States from southern Virginia to northwestern West Virginia. The completed pipeline would have a capacity of 2 million dekatherms (Dts) of natural gas per day. Most of that gas would originate from the Marcellus and Utica shale formations. This would make the pipeline full of highly explosive natural gas and under, approximately, 1.440 pounds per square inch of pressure.

=== Concerns ===
Opponents of the MVP have expressed safety concerns related to pipeline explosions, objection to seizures of private land through eminent domain, and concerns about the project’s contribution to climate change. They have also expressed concerns about erosion from disturbance on steep slopes causing water pollution, and damage to scenery around the Appalachian Trail.

=== Opposition to the pipeline ===
The Yellow Finch tree sit was one of several blockades against the MVP as part of an ongoing resistance to the pipeline that began in 2018. This resistance is organized by a non-hierarchical group of autonomous individuals called Appalachians Against Pipelines. Individuals in this group often use pseudonyms to maintain anonymity. Some local residents have supported the campaign and been arrested for participating in blockades.

Other blockades related to the campaign include: a one-month tree-sit in Roanoke, Virginia; a 57-day tree-sit that ended on May 23, 2018, and became the longest continuously occupied blockade east of the Mississippi; a monopod blockade beginning on May 21, 2018; and several incidents where individuals have chained themselves to construction equipment or otherwise blocked access to construction sites.

A Facebook group for Appalachians Against Pipelines had over 19,000 followers in September 2021 when MVP subpoenaed Facebook in an attempt to acquire the names and telephone numbers of the people who manage the page.

Activists associated with Appalachians Against Pipelines have made statements connecting their campaign against the pipeline to the prison abolition movement.

== Description of the Yellow Finch blockade ==
The Yellow Finch blockade consisted of three tarp-covered platforms about 50 feet high in white pine and chestnut oak trees near Yellow Finch Lane in Montgomery County, Virginia near Elliston. The blockade was located in an area with steep slopes, making access with cranes difficult for law enforcement officials attempting to extract the protestors. Several activists rotated in and out of the stands with support from a ground team of approximately ten people until ground support was removed by law enforcement following a court-ordered injunction in November 2020.

Two activists in the tree stands refused to vacate the stands after the Nov. 2020, injunction. Following their refusal, the judge found them in contempt of court and fined them $500 per day.

== Extraction and sentencing ==
Only two of the three tree stands that comprised the blockade were occupied when law enforcement extracted the remaining activists on March 24, 2021. Steep slopes and difficult terrain made extraction difficult, and a hydraulic crane was brought in and assembled on site.

The protestors extracted from the blockade were each convicted of two misdemeanor charges for obstructing justice and interfering with the property rights of MVP. They were sentenced to two days in jail for each day they had occupied the blockade, resulting in a 158 day sentence for one of the activists and a 254 day sentence for the other. They were also fined $10,000 and $17,500 respectively and ordered to pay MVP $141,386 in accrued costs for the extraction operation.

Other activists occupying the blockades were not identified.
