= Positive environmentalism =

Positive environmentalism is a term used to refer to a pro-technology, pro-"progress" view of protecting the world's environment. The term came into usage in UK politics after it was used on BBC News by Alex Singleton, Director-General of the Globalisation Institute.

According to Alex Singleton: "There are fundamentally two approaches to environmental action - there is the negative environmentalism, full of doom and gloom, which thinks that improving the environment has to be through restricting foreign holidays, stopping economic growth, limiting trade, or curbing GDP. And then there is the positive environmentalism, which recognises the importance of technology, innovation and economic development, and practical measures by individuals".

== See also ==
- Bright green environmentalism
- Technogaianism
- Patrick Moore, prominent positive environmentalist
