= Plane Mad =

Irish direct action group

Plane Mad was an Irish direct action group that campaigned against the aviation industry's contribution to climate change for a short period in the late 2000s. It was established in 2007, and was a sister group to the British group Plane Stupid. It was a non-hierarchical organisation.

Its four main demands were:

- An end to airport expansion
- An end to subsidies for internal flights
- A ban on advertising of aviation
- A tax on aviation fuel

In September 2008, it interrupted the Ryanair AGM at Dublin Airport, during CEO Michael O'Leary's speech. In November 2008, it interrupted a speech by Green Party Minister for the Environment, Heritage and Local Government John Gormley in north Dublin in protest at the planned expansion of Dublin Airport.

== See also ==
- Environmental impact of aviation
