= Global Climate Strike =

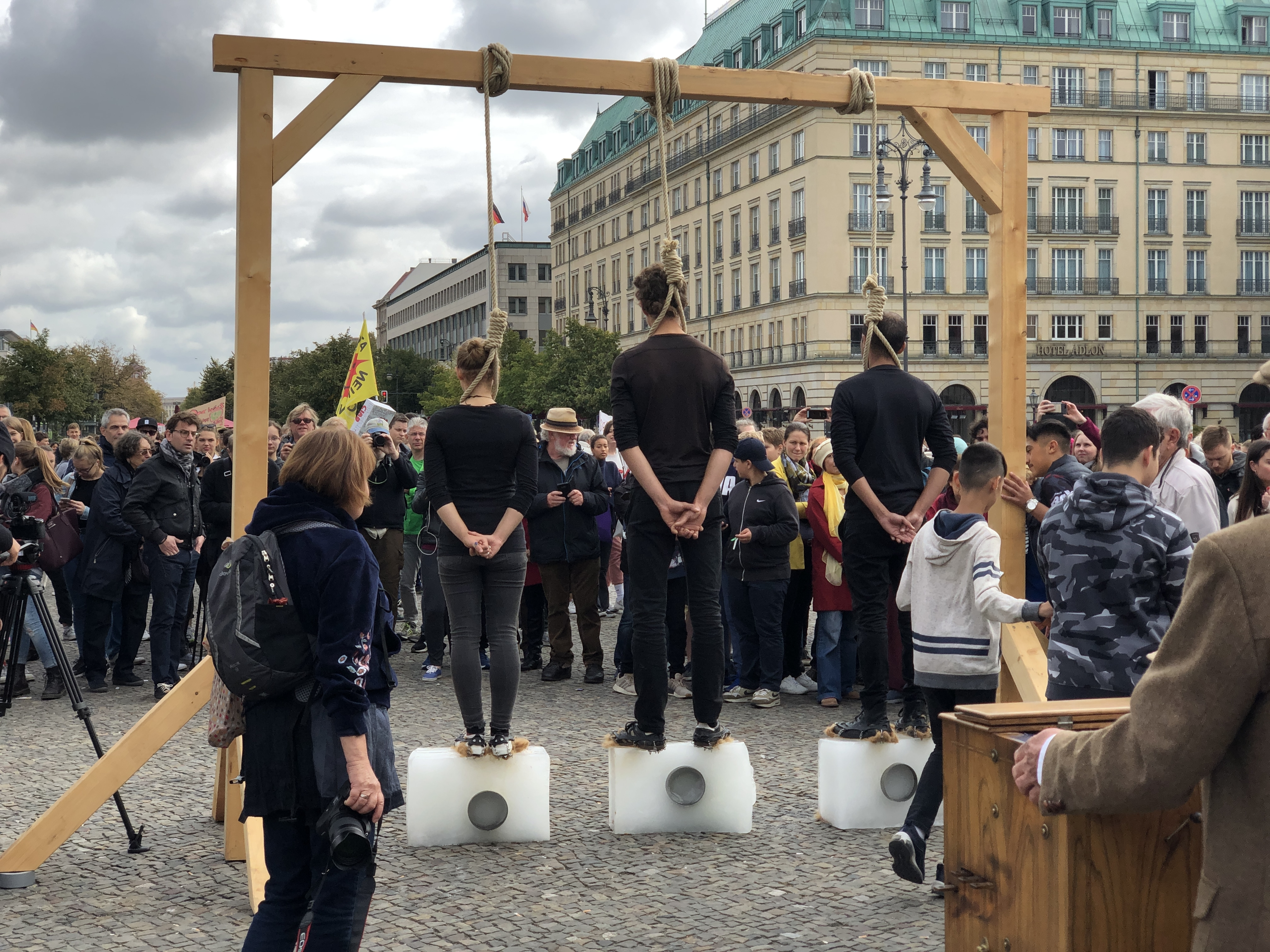
Image of Global climate strike in Berlin 2019-09-20

Global Climate Strike may refer to:

- Climate Strike of November 2015, a worldwide climate strike occurring on 30 November 2015 in parallel to the 2015 United Nations Climate Conference
- Global Climate Strike for Future, the first global climate strike of the Fridays for Future movement on 15 March 2019
- Global Climate Strike of May 2019, the second global climate strike of the Fridays for Future movement on 24 May 2019

United Nations Climate Action Summit

- Global Climate Strike of November 2019, the fourth global climate strike of the Fridays for Future movement on 29 November 2019 three days before the start of the United Nations Climate Change Conference (COP25) in Madrid

== See also ==
- School strike for climate
- List of school climate strikes
- List of environmental protests
