= Say Yes demonstrations =

Series of Australian political demonstrations

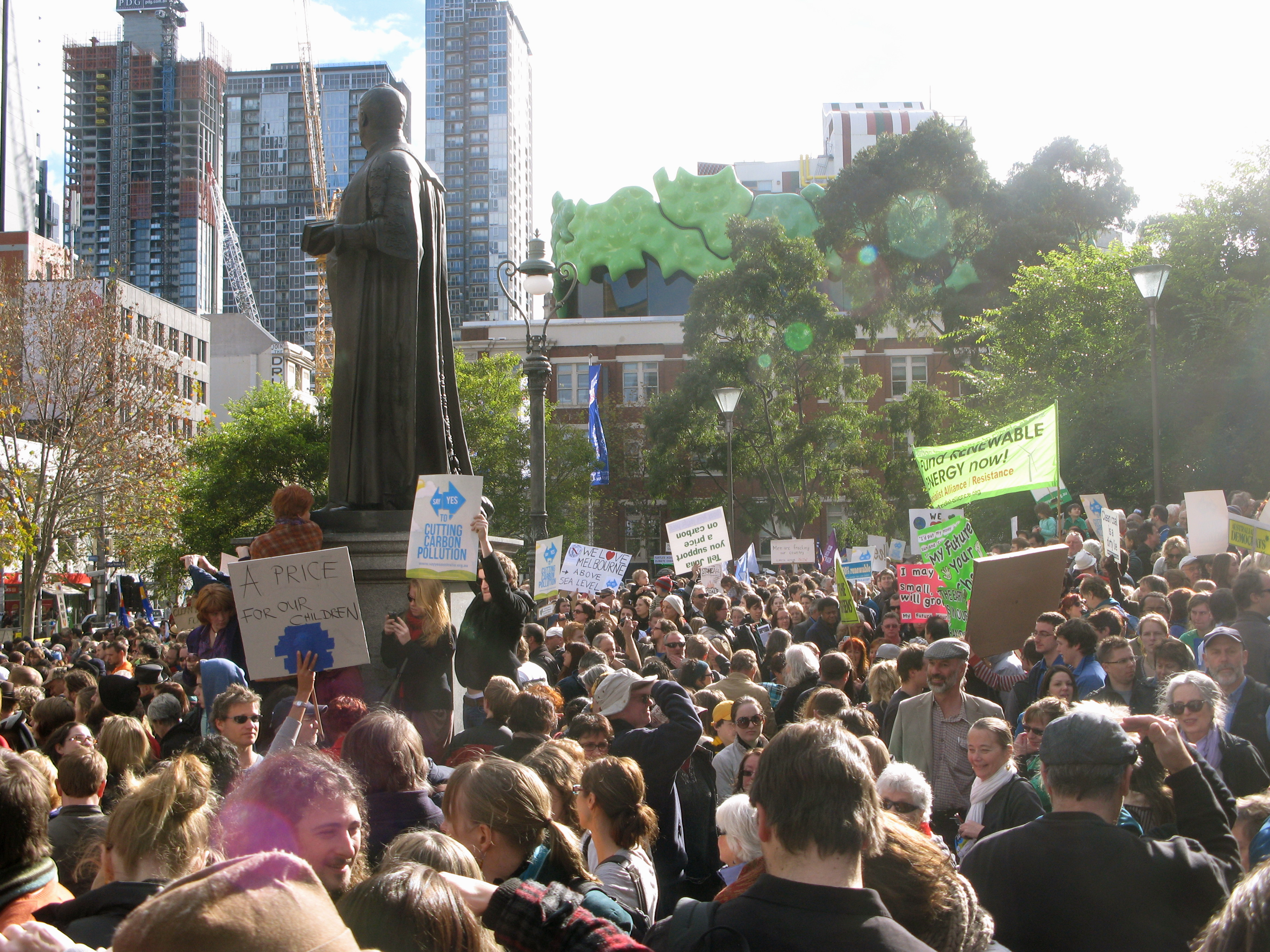
Part of the crowd at the State Library of Victoria during the Melbourne demonstration.

The "Say Yes" demonstrations were a series of simultaneous political demonstrations held in major cities across Australia on 5 June 2011 to coincide with World Environment Day. The gatherings were organised as demonstrations of some public support for political action on climate change in Australia, including support for mitigation, investment in renewable energy and decommissioning of fossil fuel power stations and polluting industry. The largest individual gatherings attracting 10,000 in Melbourne and 8,000 in Sydney.

== Description ==
The "Say Yes" campaign was started with actors Cate Blanchett and Michael Caton appearing in a national television advertisement.

The demonstrations were organised by Say Yes Australia, a coalition of community groups, environmental organisations, unions, associations and other groups and was apolitical. All demonstrations were peaceful with no injuries or arrests.

The Federal Treasurer, Wayne Swan, attended the Brisbane rally. In Canberra, the ACT Chief Minister, Katy Gallagher, was in attendance.

== Locations and attendance ==
- Melbourne - 10,000
- Canberra
- Sydney - 8,000
- Brisbane - 5,000 or 2,000
- Adelaide - 5,000 or 3,000
- Perth - 3,000
- Hobart
