= Plane Stupid =

UK-focused group of environmental protesters

- Founded: 2005
- Purpose: Environmental
- Region served: United Kingdom
- Method: Nonviolence, direct action
- Website: www.planestupid.com

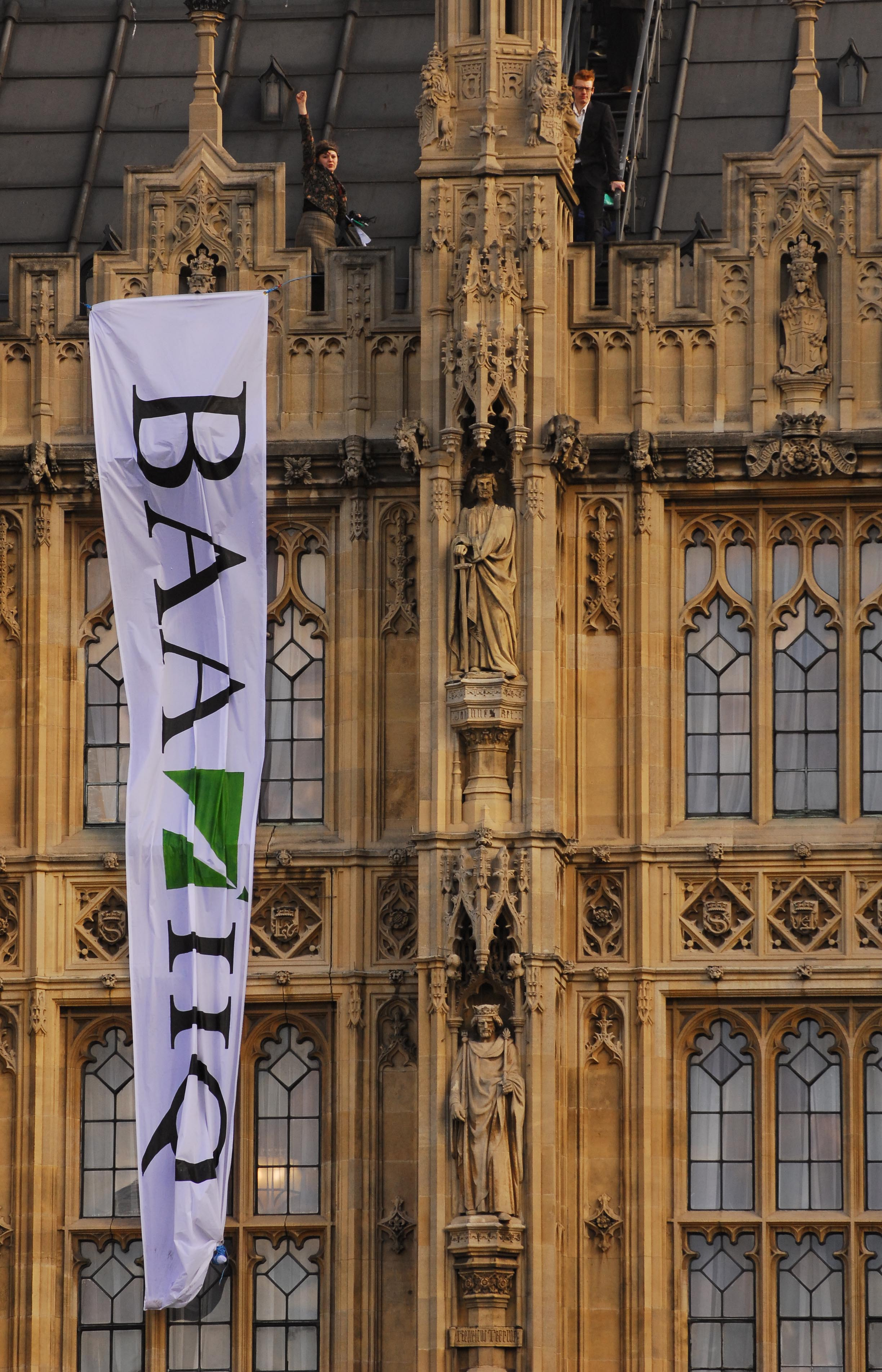
Protesters on the roof of the Palace of Westminster

Plane Stupid is a UK-focused group of environmental protesters who state their aim as wanting to see an end to airport expansion for what it sees as "unnecessary and unsustainable" flights. It is a loose association of autonomous regional groups, and is funded by donations.

The group was founded in 2005 by Joss Garman, Richard George and Graham Thompson. In January 2008 Joss Garman was named by The Guardian as one of its "50 people who could save the planet" for his campaigning work around aviation.

== History ==
The group was formed in September 2005 when a group of activists decided to disrupt an international aviation conference held in a central London hotel. They released helium balloons with personal alarms up to the ceiling during the keynote speech by a senior British Airways executive.

=== Protests at UK airports ===
In September 2006 Plane Stupid blocked a taxiway at East Midlands Airport for four hours. Leicestershire police said that officers were on scene within minutes, but by that time airport security already had the demonstrators contained and therefore they did not find it necessary to deploy all the resources available to them.

In October 2007 Plane Stupid blockaded the entrance to at Manchester Airport's departure lounge in Terminal 3.

Protesters protested the opening of Heathrow Airport's Terminal 5 in March 2008. A spokesman for Heathrow's owner, BAA plc, stated that the group was better off debating with the aviation industry than performing publicity stunts, and Michelle Di Leo of Flying Matters commented that the gesture was irresponsible.

==== Stansted Airport, December 2008 ====
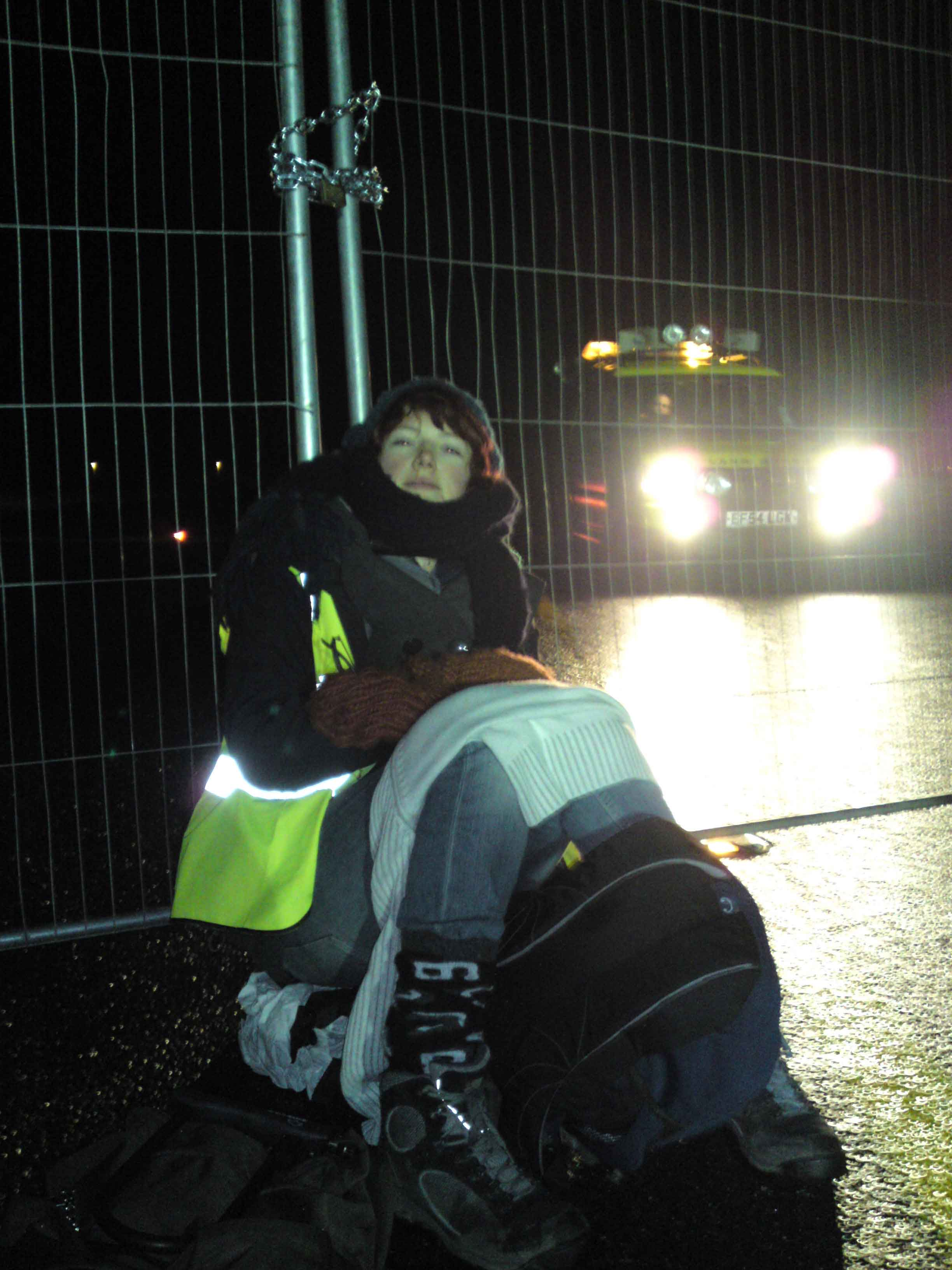
A protester blocking the taxi-way

On 8 December 2008 Plane Stupid activists occupied a taxiway at London Stansted Airport. The protest occurred during the 2008 United Nations Climate Change Conference in Poznań. They breached security whilst the runway was closed and prevented it from re-opening as planned at 05:00. Fifty-seven protesters were later arrested. BAA said protesters did not get on to the runway, but it was closed as a "precaution". Fifty-six Ryanair flights were cancelled and 56,000 passengers were delayed by the protest.

David Millward, Transport Editor for The Telegraph suggested that they should be called 'Plane Selfish' and Judge John Perkins told the court when sentencing 22 protesters to between 50 and 90 hours of community services that "Substantial loss was caused to the authorities that were carrying out lawful activities. I accept there is an honourable tradition of peaceful protest in this country, and long may it continue. But that does not justify the sort of activity that you were involved in." Ryanair is seeking £2.2 million in compensation for the disruption caused and almost £500,000 for "reputational damage" from BAA.

BAA formally withdrew its planning application for a second Stansted runway on 24 May 2010.

==== Southampton Airport, February 2009 ====
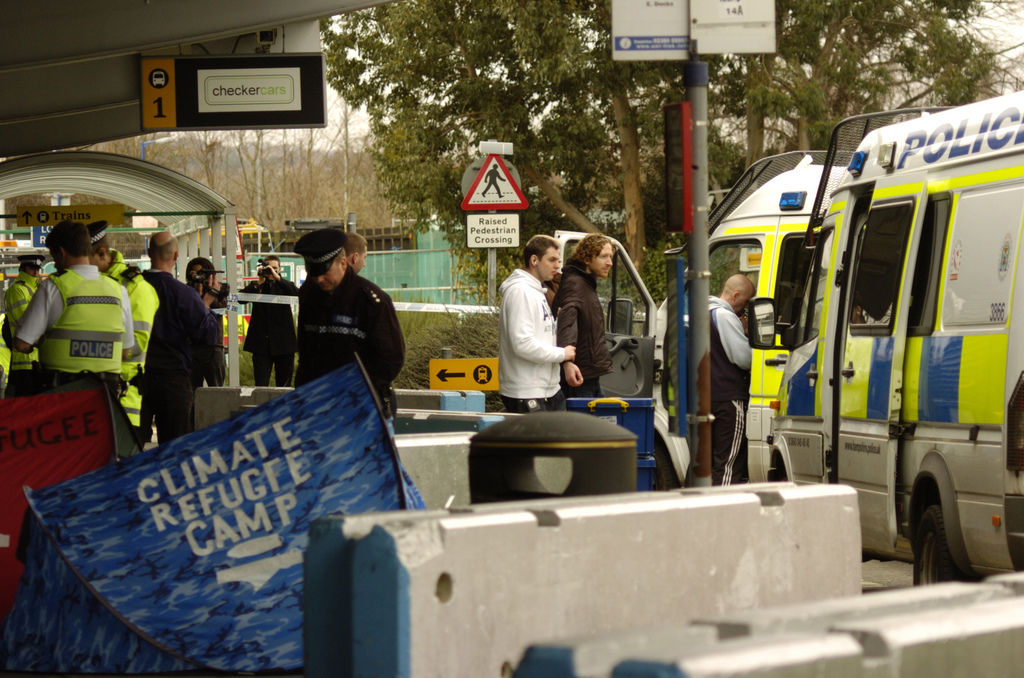
Protesters outside Southampton Airport

Activists chained themselves to the main entrance to Southampton Airport and put up tents in protest at plans to expand the airport.

==== Aberdeen Airport, March 2009 ====
On 3 March 2009, seven protesters from Plane Stupid occupied a taxiway at Aberdeen Airport, barricading themselves within a makeshift wire enclosure while two further protesters occupied the roof of the main terminal building.

Nine of the activists involved were released on bail from Aberdeen Sheriff Court on 4 March after being charged with breach of the peace and vandalism in connection with the protest. They were banned from going near airports.

==== London City Airport, 10 June 2009 ====
Five activists dressed in pinstriped suits and bowler hats cut through the perimeter fence at London City Airport in the early hours of the morning and formed a 'human wheel clamp' around one of the private jets parked next to the runway. During the three-hour protest, the first flights into the airport were diverted until a Protester Removal Team arrived and cut through the metal arm-locks linking the activists together. The action was designed to bring attention to the highly polluting effects of private jets.

On 29 September 2009 Plane Stupid activists together with activists from Flight the Flights dressed up in business suits protested at London City Airport on the first day of the new 'business-class only' trans-Atlantic British Airways flight to New York City. The service, which carries 32 passengers, was launched one week after Willie Walsh pledge to the United Nations that aviation would deliver deep cuts in carbon emissions over the coming decades. A spokesman for British Airways said the company was "absolutely committed to tackling aviation's impacts on climate change". The protest also highlighted London City Airport's plans to increase the number of flights by 50% to 120,000 a year.

==== Manchester Airport, May 2010 ====
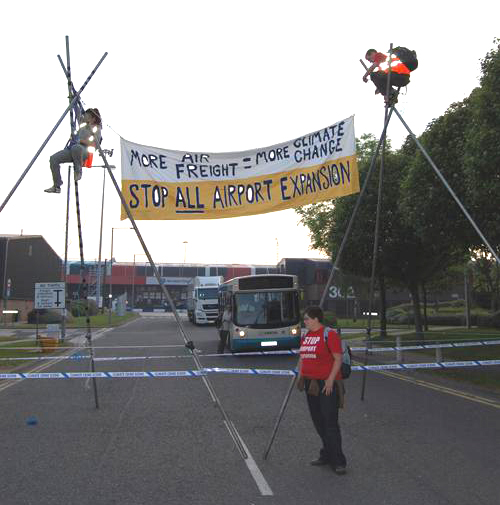
Roadside blockade of World Freight Terminal. Manchester Airport, UK. May 2010.

On 24 May 2010, two protests took place simultaneously at Manchester Airport.

==== London Heathrow Airport, July 2015 ====
On 13 July 2015, at London Heathrow Airport, thirteen protesters cut a hole in the metal perimeter fence of the airport at 3.30 a.m. and occupied the airport's north runway, causing general disruption and cancellation of 25 flights. They remained on the airport's runway until 10 a.m., when they were removed by police. The motive was opposition to the building of a third runway at the airport, which had been recommended by the Airport Commission only weeks earlier.

All thirteen protesters were arrested on suspicion of offences of the Aviation Act. During their trial, the protesters were supported by the Green Party's leader Natalie Bennett. A testimony by John McDonnell was deemed irrelevant by the residing judge. The protesters were found guilty of aggravated trespass. Although it was considered likely that all thirteen protesters would face custodial sentences, the sentencing on 24 February 2016, concluded a six-week sentence, that is suspended for 12 months. The trial was followed by a 300-strong group of supporters outside the building. One member of the group, Danielle Paffard, commented on the sentence as "a triumph for democracy, a triumph for the movement".

=== Camp for Climate Action, August 2007 ===
Climate activists blockade British Airports Authority's headquarters during a day of action.

In 2007 the Climate Camp, in its second year, chose to protest near London Heathrow Airport and on the last day of the week-long camp between 1,000 and 1,400 took part in a day of action. In the lead-up to the camp BAA applied for a wide-reaching injunction which could have restricted the movement of over 5 million people near the airport and on approach routes to the airport. Ken Livingstone, the mayor of London, said that someone at BAA must be "out of their skull."

In the end, an injunction was granted, covering three named defendants and any members of Plane Stupid, Heathrow Association for the Control of Aircraft Noise and Airportwatch who acted unlawfully. During the camp, Plane Stupid also carried out protests at Airbus, Farnborough and Biggin Hill. After the camp ended, Duncan Bonfield, BAA director of corporate affairs, and Mark Mann, BAA head of media relations, resigned without stating their reasons.

=== Other actions ===
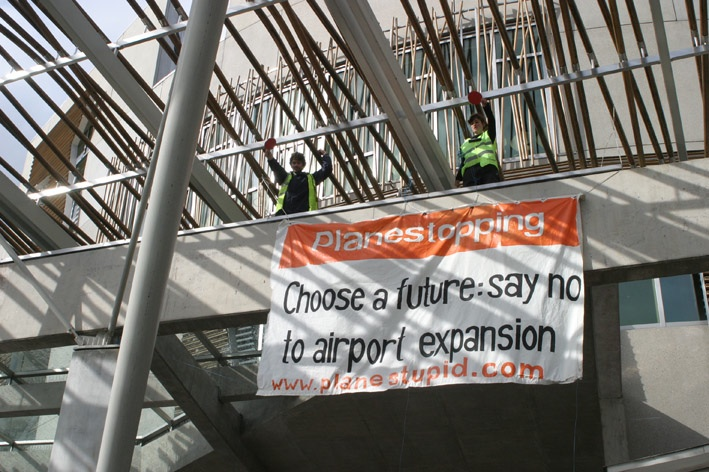
Activists on the Scottish Parliament Building

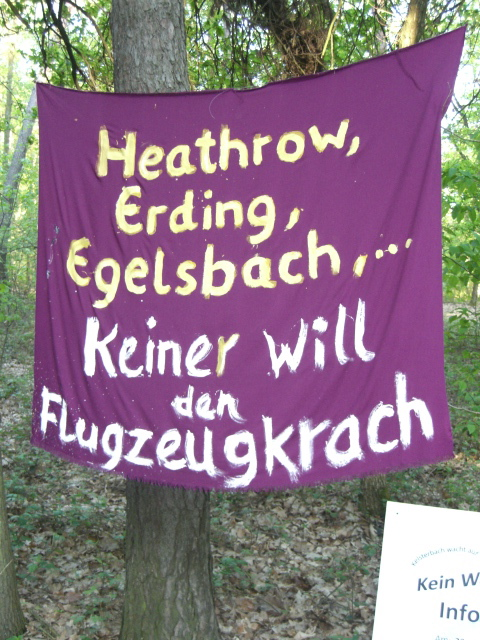
"Heathrow, Erding, Egelsbach ... nobody wants the airplane noise"

The group protested on the roof of EasyGroup's headquarters in November 2006 at the same time as the United Nations Climate talks in Nairobi. About 20 Easygroup staff were delayed getting into the building by an hour and a half.

They disrupted the deliberations of a Transport Select Committee inquiry into the future of UK airports operator BAA in November 2007, handing out leaflets and chanting before being removed by police.

During the 'Climate March' in London in December 2007, Plane Stupid activists claimed to have 'shut down' travel agents along the route. Their spokesman said: "These businesses continue, with full support from the government, to profit from wrecking our climate".

In January 2008, 30 protesters from Plane Stupid dressed as penguins took over the Natural History Museum's ice rink in protest at British Airways sponsorship of the museum's annual winter festivities.

In February 2008 Plane Stupid launched a five-person strong roof-top protest on the UK's Houses of Parliament.

In April 2008 a number of protesters climbed onto the roof of the Scottish Parliament Building. They came down after five hours and two people were arrested. The house of one of the protesters was raided by police afterwards which the protester considered harassment.

In January 2009 Plane Stupid drew attention to the opposition to the expansion of Frankfurt Airport and visited the protest camp in April

On 6 March 2009, protester Leila Deen threw green custard over Business Secretary Peter Mandelson at a low carbon summit hosted by Gordon Brown. The action was in protest at the frequent meetings between BAA representatives and ministers.

Plane Stupid activists disrupted the 'PR Week magazine awards' ceremony on 20 October 2009 after arriving in evening wear and 'hijacking' the table reserved for Virgin Atlantic. Most of the protesters were removed after around an hour.

Plane Stupid launched their 'Adopt a resident' scheme on 30 March 2009 where individual eco-activists are 'buddied' with residents of Sipson and will help them resist having their houses demolished as part of any future expansion of Heathrow; 40 residents and activists were brought together at St Mary's Church Hall in Harmondsworth on 30 March.

== Police and legal issues ==
In April 2008, Plane Stupid claimed that their group was infiltrated by an international espionage agency. The Times reported that Toby Kendall, 24, an employee of C2i International, had gone undercover in the group using the name of "Ken Tobias." Airport operator, BAA confirmed to The Times that they had been in contact with C2i International but denied ever hiring the company.

At the end of 2008, the group's website was taken offline temporarily by their web host, 1and1, following suggestions from their hosting company that they were libelling BAA plc.

Four protesters were arrested in March 2009 for Breach of the Peace after a banner drop from a multi-story carpark at Edinburgh Airport.

The Guardian reported in April 2009 that Plane Stupid activist Matilda Gifford was subject to an attempt by Strathclyde Police to recruit her as a paid informer about the group.

Plane Stupid posted a spoof website in July 2010 targeting the Fairford Air Tattoo highlighting the linkage between climate change and the military–industrial complex.

== See also ==
- AirportWatch
- Climate Rush
- Environmental direct action in the United Kingdom
- Environmental effects of aviation in the United Kingdom
- Environmental impact of aviation
- Flying Matters
- Plane Mad
