= Glasgow Airport railway station =

Proposed railway station in Renfrewshire, Scotland

Glasgow Airport
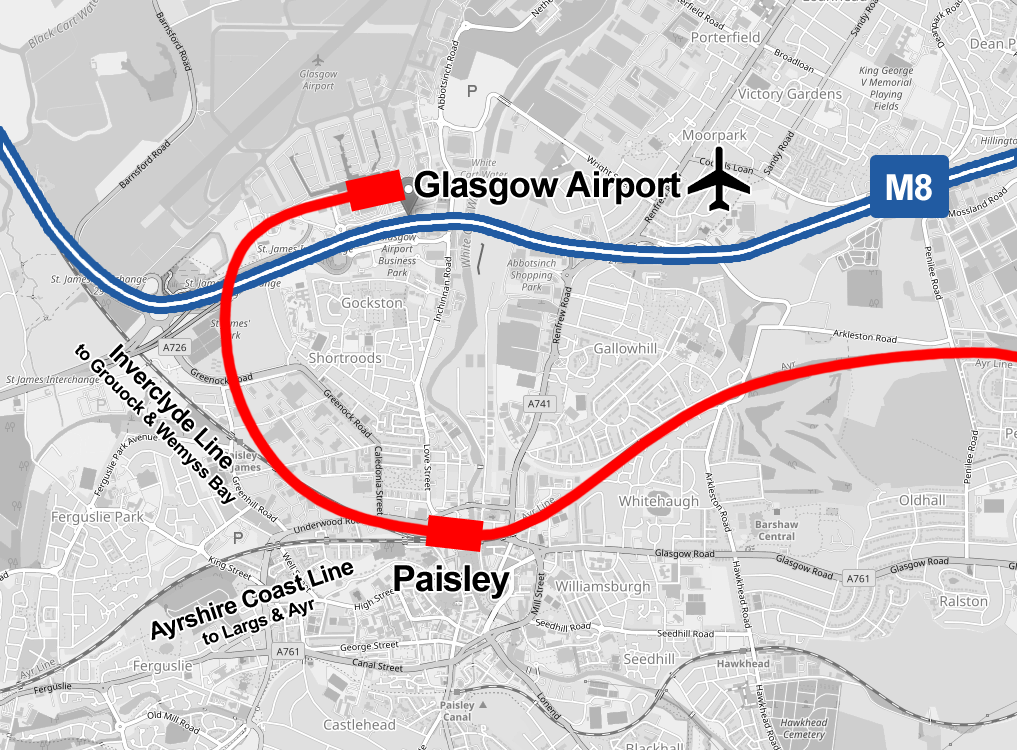
- Glasgow Airport Station on map for GARL

General information
- Location: Glasgow Airport, Renfrewshire; Scotland
- Coordinates: 55.863°N 4.428°W
- Grid reference: NS480659
- Manager: Unknown
- Transit authority: SPT
- Platforms: 2 (In original Glasgow Airport Rail Link Plan)

Other information
- Fare zone: 2

History
- Opening: Unknown
Location

Glasgow Airport railway station is a planned railway station to serve Glasgow Airport, Scotland.

== Background ==
Map of the proposed Glasgow Airport Rail Link route with Glasgow Subway connections

Glasgow Airport railway station is a planned railway station to serve Glasgow Airport, Scotland. Originally intended to open in 2010, the station would be the western terminus of the Glasgow Airport Rail Link (GARL) before it was cancelled in 2009.

On 29 November 2006, the Scottish Parliament passed the Glasgow Airport Rail Link bill by 118 votes to 8, allowing construction of the link to begin, including the airport railway station. The station was expected to be built in 2008 after a viaduct linking the proposed route with the Inverclyde Line was due for construction across the M8 motorway.

BAA Limited, the owners of Glasgow Airport at the time, were expected to fund the building of a walkway from the main terminal building to the proposed railway station. The station would have had two platforms available for terminating and departing services.

== Revival plans ==
=== 2016 Tram-Train ===
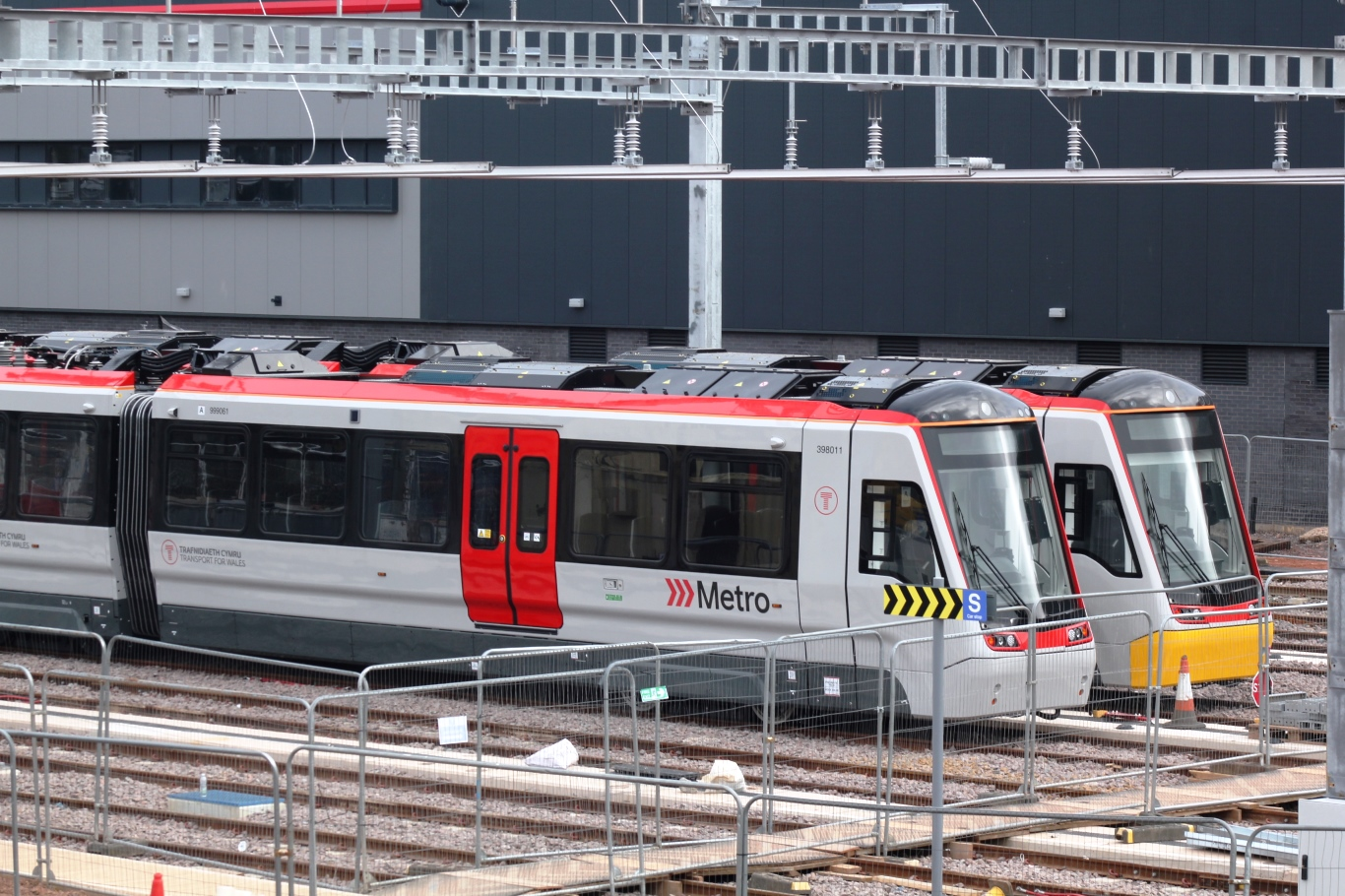
Class 398 Tram-Trains for Wales

In December 2016, councillors approved a tram-train link to the airport which was intended to be operational by 2025. The link would branch off Paisley Gilmour Street then head to a new station at Glasgow Airport. The link was proposed to be operated by Abellio ScotRail.

=== 2019 PRT Proposal ===
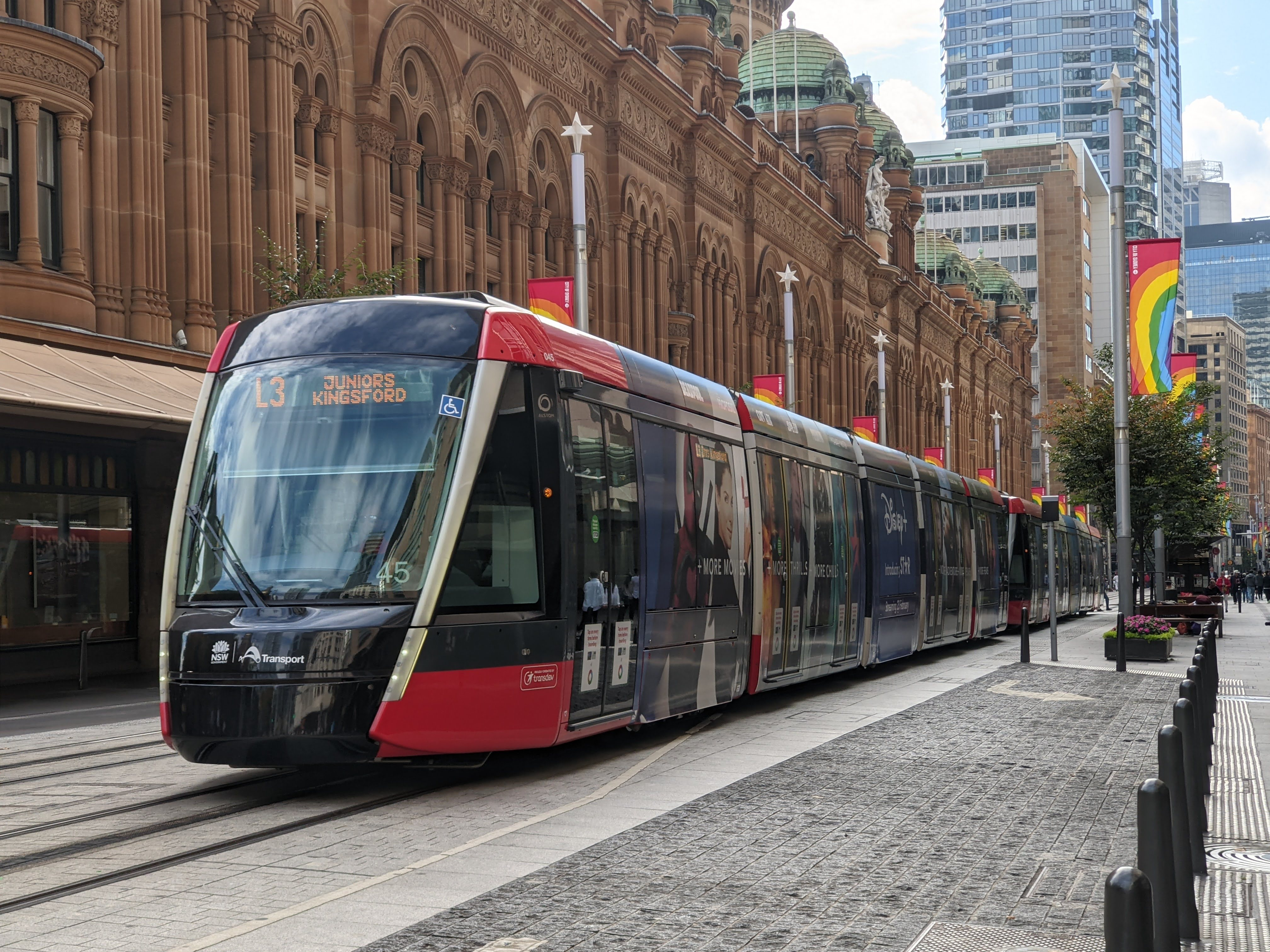
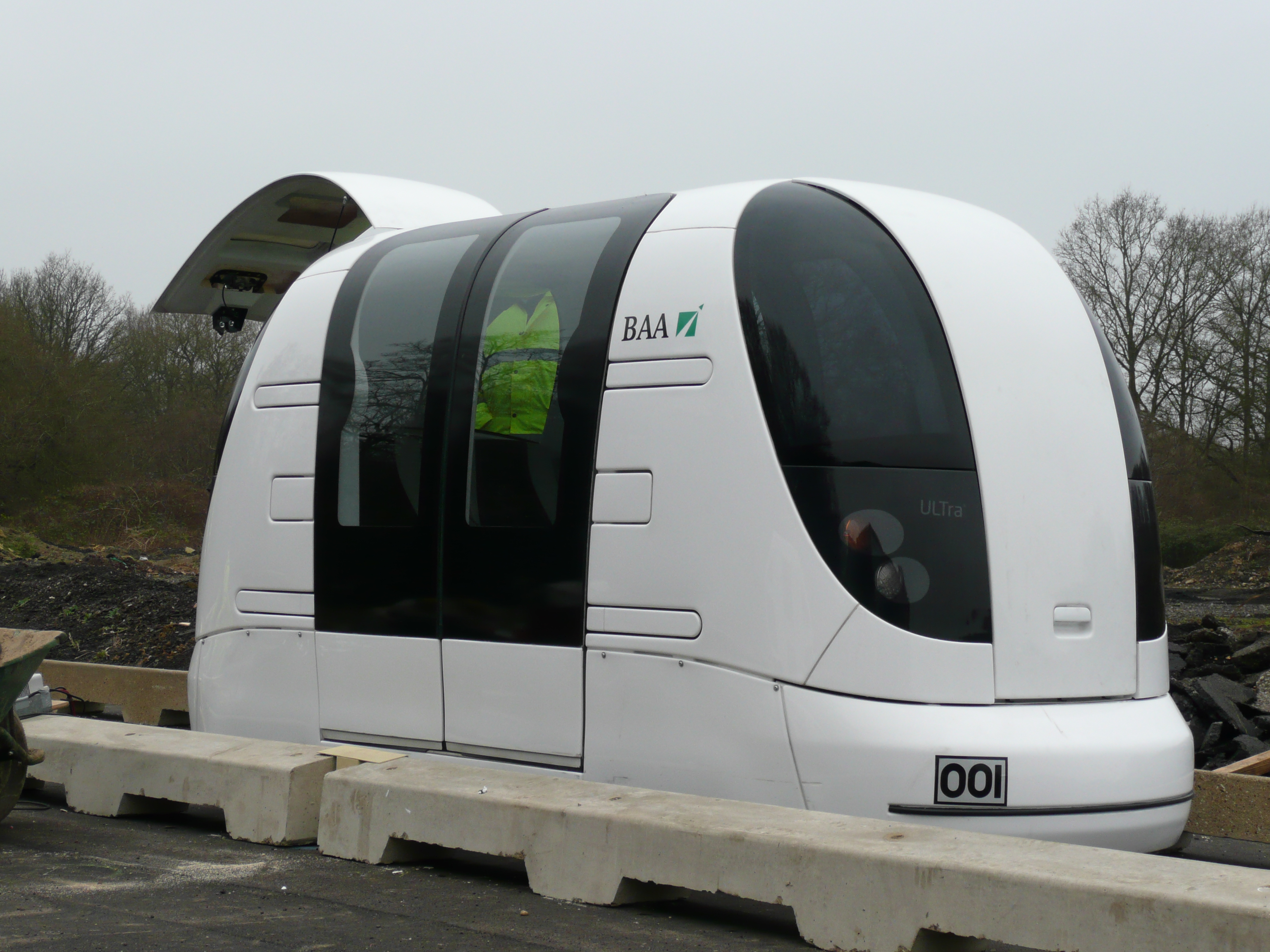
Light rail (left) and PRT (right) options

In 2019, the initial plans to create a direct light rail link were once again shelved. One of the reasons stated was concerns of overcrowding at Glasgow Central. A new proposal was then suggested to adopt the cheaper Personal Rapid Transit system instead between Glasgow Airport and Paisley Gilmour Street. Glasgow MP Paul Sweeney criticised Glasgow City Council leader Susan Aitken for supporting the downgraded option to use the people mover system to the airport, instead of light rail that would be integrated with the main Paisley Gilmour Street railway station and the wider city region rail network.

In 2019 as part of a wider £10 billion plan for a 'Glasgow Metro' network, the Glasgow Connectivity Commission endorsed light rail instead of the PRT option and proposed linking Glasgow airport to Braehead and the Queen Elizabeth University Hospital with a segregated light rail line to Glasgow Central via Govan, instead of using tram-trains. The first phase was approved by Glasgow and Renfrewshire council leaders in early 2020. The initial project would link Glasgow airport to Paisley Gilmour Street train station. Construction will not begin until full approval from both councils is given.

=== Clyde Metro ===
The later 2019 project has now been integrated into the larger Clyde Metro plan, with a proposed station at Glasgow Airport on a heavy metro line.
