= AirMall =

US airport concession operator

Coordinates: 40.49591°N 80.24697°W

AirMall USA was a developer and manager of retail, food and beverage concessions at various US airports, with a major presence at Pittsburgh International Airport. In 2014 AirMall was acquired by the German Fraport Group, which continued the airport concession operations.

== History ==
The first AirMall opened at Pittsburgh International Airport in 1992. Today the company also operates AirMall at Baltimore/Washington International Airport and Boston's Logan International Airport, however Pittsburgh remains by far the largest. An AirMall opened at Cleveland Hopkins International Airport in the spring of 2009 as well. The stores in the AirMall were the first in the US to price their merchandise the same as they would at a store in a typical retail setting, a policy that was later followed by concessionaires at some other airports in the US.

Originally owned by BAA USA (then a subsidiary of BAA plc), AirMall was then owned by the New York-based investment company Prospect Capital Corporation. In August 2014 AirMall was acquired by the German Fraport Group, the operator of Frankfurt International Airport and another ten airports around the globe. Fraport has since merged its North American concessions business into its Fraport USA division.

== Pittsburgh International Airport concessions ==
Opened along with the new airport in 1992, AirMall in Pittsburgh was the largest airport shopping complex in the United States. The current mall, now under Fraport management, is located within the airport's airside terminal, mostly in the "Center Core" area, with some shops and restaurants extending into the concourses. Prior to 9/11, and the opening of The Mall at Robinson, the Airmall served as a shopping destination for residents of the western suburbs of Pittsburgh.

Because the mall is located beyond the security checkpoint, where only ticketed passengers and authorized personnel had been permitted for more than a decade after 9/11, and the reduction of the use of Pittsburgh International as a US Airways hub, sales have decreased in recent years. On April 13, 2007, it was announced that guests staying at the attached airport Hyatt hotel would be able to obtain passes to shop during their stay. Even with sales being down due to US Airways cutbacks and the Great Recession, the AirMall in Pittsburgh still accounted for the highest per passenger spending of any airport in the country, at an average of $13.60/passenger.

In 2017, Pittsburgh International became the first US commercial airport to allow the general public access to the area beyond the checkpoint. Visitors must first sign up for the "myPITpass" program on the airport's website; following approval, they must still pass the same security checks required of ticketed passengers. The Association of Professional Flight Attendants condemned the move.

After the Allegheny County Airport Authority moved to end Fraport's concession lease at the Pittsburgh airport, Fraport sued; the case went to trial in 2022. The airport authority cited lax safety standards by Fraport for pulling the lease; Fraport denied this. As of May 2023, The Allegheny County Airport authority appeals ruling ordering the return of evicted AirMall operator.
