= AGS Airports =

British airport operator

AGS Airports Limited
- Company type: Private
- Industry: Transport
- Founded: 30 September 2014
- Founder: Ferrovial; Macquarie Group
- Headquarters: Leeds, England, UK
- Key people: Kam Jandu (CEO); Charles Hammond (Chairman)
- Products: Airport operations and services
- Revenue: £198 million (2023)
- Operating income: £69 million (2023)
- Net income: (£14 million) (2023)
- Parent: AviAlliance (78%); Blackstone (22%)
- Subsidiaries: Aberdeen Airport; Glasgow Airport; Southampton Airport
- Website: www.agsairports.co.uk

The 3 airports owned by AGS

AGS Airports Limited is the owner of Aberdeen, Glasgow and Southampton airports. Based in Leeds, England, it was formed in September 2014 by Ferrovial and Macquarie Group. In January 2025 it was sold to AviAlliance.

== History ==
Aberdeen, Glasgow and Southampton airports were originally owned and operated by the British Airports Authority, which acquired them in the 1970s. In the late 1980s the authority was sold off by the government and became BAA plc.

By 2012 BAA had sold off three of its seven airports and rebranded as Heathrow Airport Holdings (HAH). In 2014 HAH decided to sell off Aberdeen, Glasgow and Southampton to enable the company to focus on improving Heathrow for passengers and winning support for Heathrow expansion.

Meanwhile, AGS Airports was formed by Ferrovial and Macquarie Group. In December 2014, three months after being incorporated, AGS acquired Aberdeen, Glasgow and Southampton Airports from HAH.

In November 2024, it was announced that terms had been agreed to sell AGS for £1.53 billion to AviAlliance. In March 2025 Blackstone acquired a 22% shareholding in AGS with AviAlliance retaining the other 78%.

== Airports ==
AGS owns and operates three airports:

- Aberdeen Airport
- Glasgow Airport
- Southampton Airport
