= Glasgow Airport Rail Link =

Proposed airport rail line

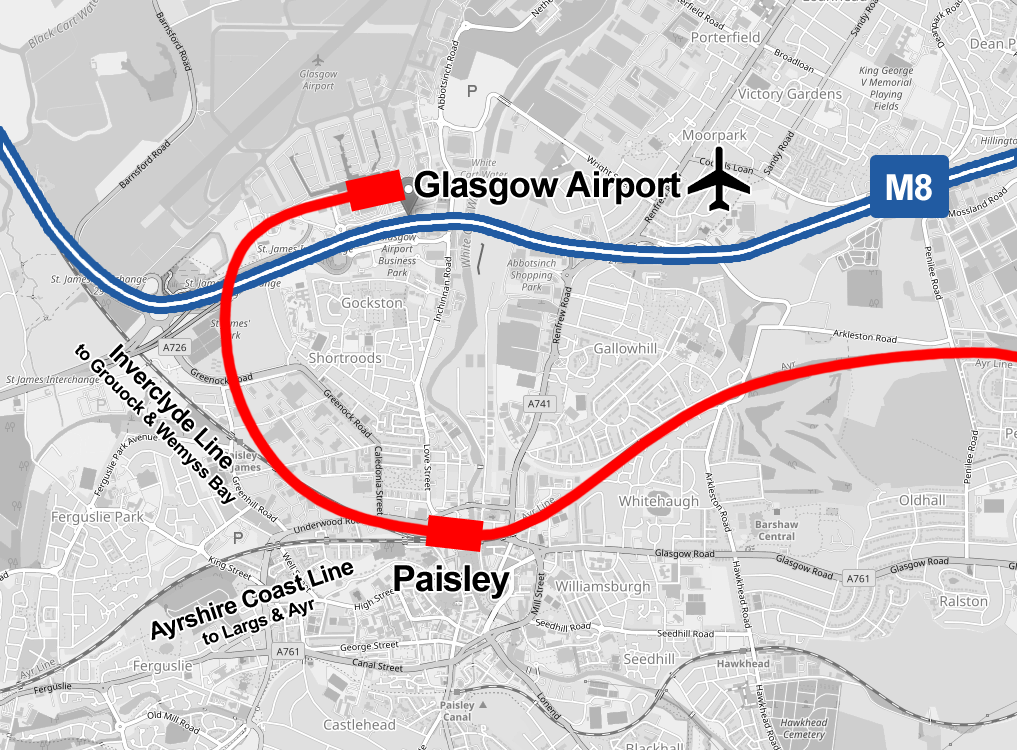
- The 2006 planned route of GARL from Paisley to Glasgow Airport

Overview
- Status: Proposed
- Locale: Glasgow; Renfrewshire
- Termini: Glasgow Central; Glasgow Airport
- Connecting lines: Ayrshire Coast Line; Inverclyde Line
- Website: www.transportscotland.gov.uk/projects/garl

Service
- System: ScotRail

Technical
- Number of tracks: Double track
- Track gauge: 1,435 mm (4 ft 8 1/2 in) standard gauge

The Glasgow Airport Rail Link (GARL) is a proposed link between Glasgow City Centre and Glasgow Airport. The original plans for an airport rail link were proposed during the 2000s to directly link Glasgow Central station with Glasgow Airport in Scotland. The link was intended for completion by 2013 and would have had a service of four trains per hour via Paisley Gilmour Street railway station.

On 17 September 2009 the rail link was cancelled as part of public spending cuts.

In 2014, proposals were in place to resurrect the project dependent on the outcome of the Scottish independence referendum.

In October 2016, plans were resurrected to build a railway link to Glasgow Airport. A journey time of 16.5 minutes has also been proposed. Under those plans the line would be opened in 2025.

In 2019, it was proposed to deliver the project as part of a wider Clyde Metro network, using a new light rail line via Govan.

== Route ==
Map of the proposed route with Glasgow Subway connections

GARL would have run from a reconstructed Platform 11A at Glasgow Central on the former Glasgow and Paisley Joint Railway, Ayrshire Coast Line and Inverclyde Line; via Cardonald, Hillington East and Hillington West, to Paisley Gilmour Street station. It would then have run along the Inverclyde Line branching-off just before Paisley St James, onto a new purpose-built 1.2-mile (1.9 km) line which would have taken it over the M8 motorway into the airport station, situated close to the main terminal building at Glasgow Airport. A video and extra information regarding the project can be found on the linked here.

== Construction of the link ==
The Scottish Parliament on 29 November 2006 passed the GARL bill by 118 votes to 8, thus allowing the construction of the route to begin. Construction was to be in phases with the re-location of football pitches in the route's path at Paisley St James scheduled for 2007, before route clearing and track work in 2007 and 2008. The cost of the route was estimated at £170m, with inflation increasing the cost to a potential £210m.

The Ayrshire and Inverclyde lines are very busy with passenger and freight traffic. To provide capacity for trains serving the airport, the GARL plans included the installation of a bi-directional third track in the center of the existing two between Shields Junction at the Glasgow end and Arkleston Junction, approximately one mile (1.6 km) east of Paisley Gilmour Street, and the installation of an additional two tracks between Arkleston Junction and a re-configured Wallneuk Junction immediately east of Gilmour Street where the Ayrshire and Inverclyde lines split before entering the station.

The most controversial proposal in the scheme was the building of the line on a viaduct over playing fields in the Paisley St. James area and into Glasgow Airport. After much discussion, SPT assured local residents that the playing fields would be returned to original use, with even better facilities such as under-soil drainage and new changing rooms. Using a one-piece bridge design, GARL was to cross the M8 motorway and into the airport.

The scheme was also criticised for the absence of direct connections to the rest of the Scottish railway network which would bypass Glasgow Central - historically the two options for doing this have been Cross rail Glasgow and the electrification of the Shotts Line to Edinburgh. In May 2008, First ScotRail announced that the Shotts Line had been route cleared for Class 158 and Class 170 DMU trains to operate on the line and that an increase in services was likely in the near future.

In 2008, control of the GARL project passed from SPT to Transport Scotland who would have overseen the building of the route. Overhead catenary work and a re-modelling of Shields Junction over the past year have already taken place in connection with GARL. In December 2008, Transport Scotland announced that the tender competition will begin in spring 2009, meaning GARL would have been operational in early 2013.

== Rolling stock ==
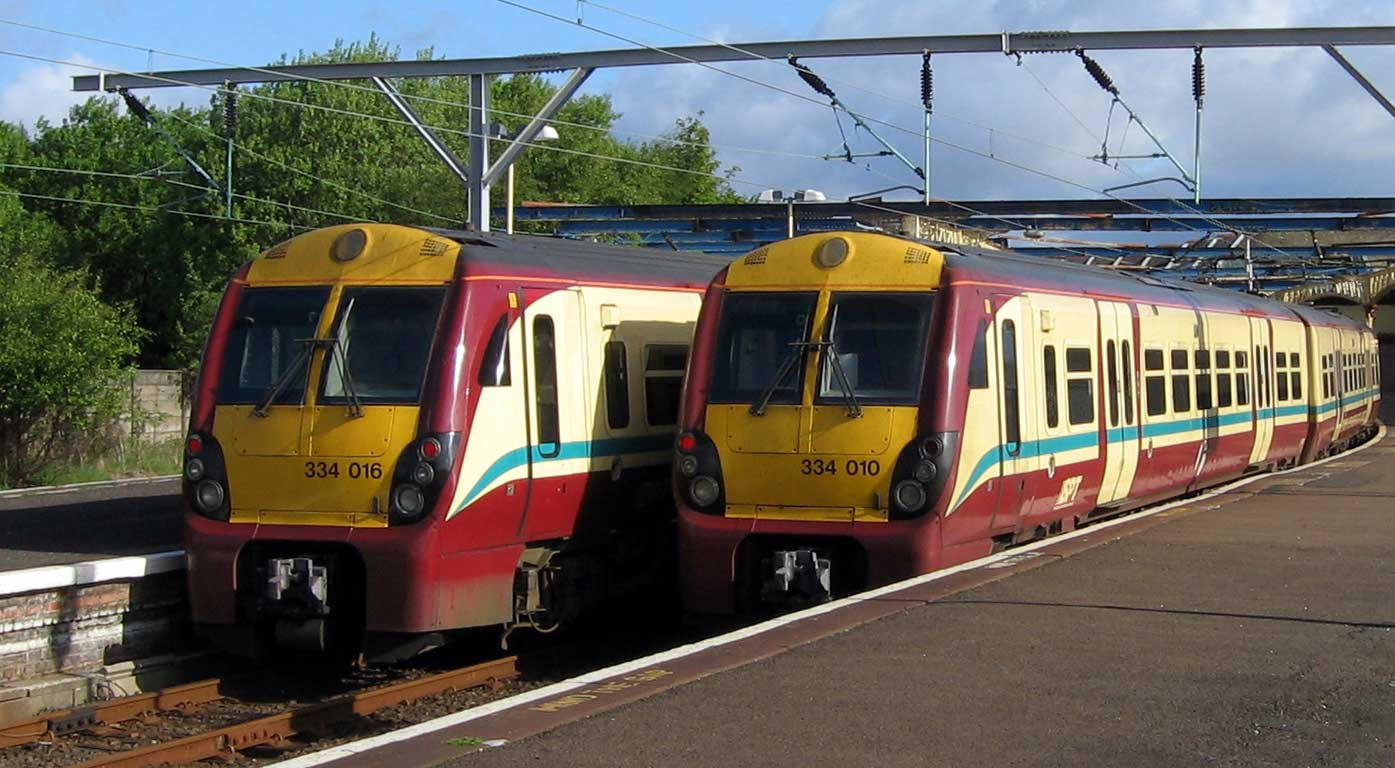
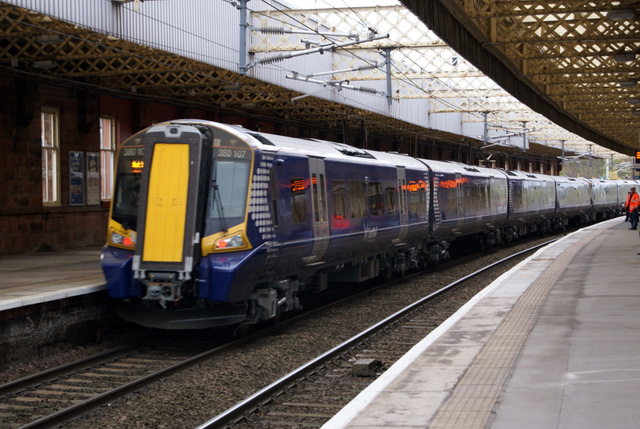
Class 334 (left) and Class 380 (right)

In the proposals drawn up by Strathclyde Partnership for Transport, Class 334 units are shown to work the route. However, speculation surrounds actual rolling stock plans for GARL with the likelihood of First ScotRail using 4-car EMUs rather than a traditional 3-car unit. First ScotRail formerly used 4-car British Rail Class 322 units on its Glasgow Central/Edinburgh Waverley to North Berwick service - themselves ex-airport rail link trains, having been originally built to serve Stansted Airport near London.

In April 2008, First ScotRail placed a bid to tender for a new build of railway carriages for the SPT network of 120 vehicles. Subsequently, on 11 July 2008, Transport Scotland announced that 38 Class 380 trains have been ordered for use on Ayrshire and Inverclyde services and also the Glasgow Airport Rail Link. With the latter project cancelled, the additional units will be put to use on other services in the future.

== Cancellation ==
On 17 September 2009, the Scottish Government cancelled the airport branch component of the GARL project amid concerns over the need for public spending cuts. However, elements of the GARL plans that upgraded the Glasgow–Paisley lines (including replacement of life-expired signalling, provision of two additional platform at Glasgow Central, and installation of the additional tracks between Shields and Wallneuk Junction) were excluded from the cancellation decision and instead taken forward as the separate Paisley Corridor Improvements project, which was completed in 2012.

As part of the driver training programme for the route and new rolling stock, design and media company Totalize Media were hired to create a simulation of the infrastructure. This simulation was built using a professional derivative of the railway simulator Train Simulator / RailWorks. With the cancellation of the project, Totalize Media redirected the development into a home simulation title.

== Planned reinstatement of the link ==
After the project was cancelled, a tram-train line has been proposed to connect Glasgow Airport with the City Centre using a one-mile tram line to the airport from the Inverclyde Line.

On 3 July 2014, an article in Glasgow's Evening Times newspaper - jointly written by Prime Minister David Cameron and Chief Secretary to the Treasury Danny Alexander - said: "Glasgow plans to create a £1.1 billion infrastructure fund that will support projects such as the city centre-airport rail link, major improvements to the region's roads and bus network, and the development of new employment sites." The proposals would entail a 50/50 investment with £500m each coming from the UK central government in Westminster and the Scottish Government in Holyrood, but being dependent on a "No" vote in the Scottish Independence referendum. A resurrected GARL would be included as one of the projects which could possibly be funded by the fund.

=== 2016 Proposals ===
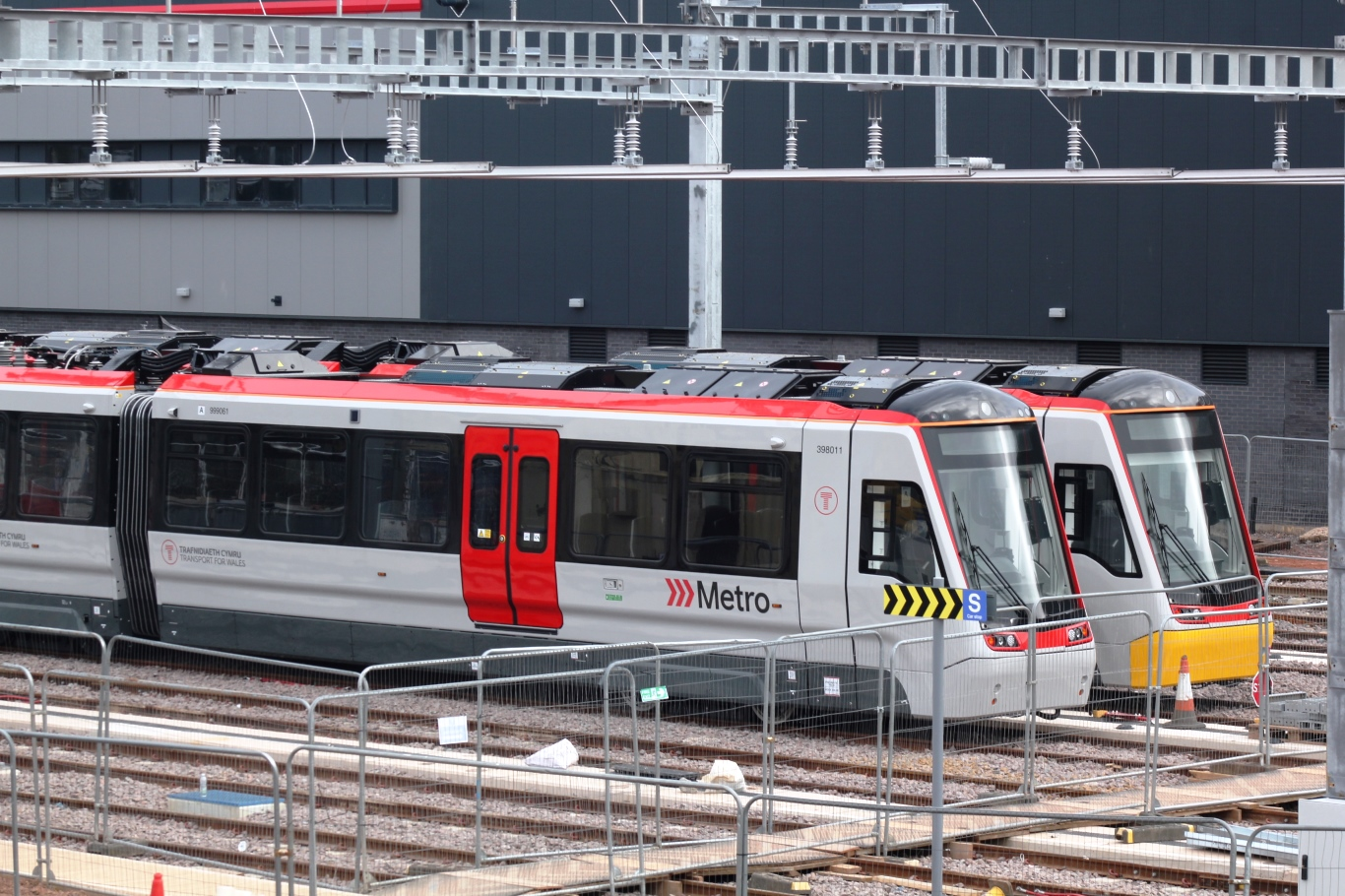
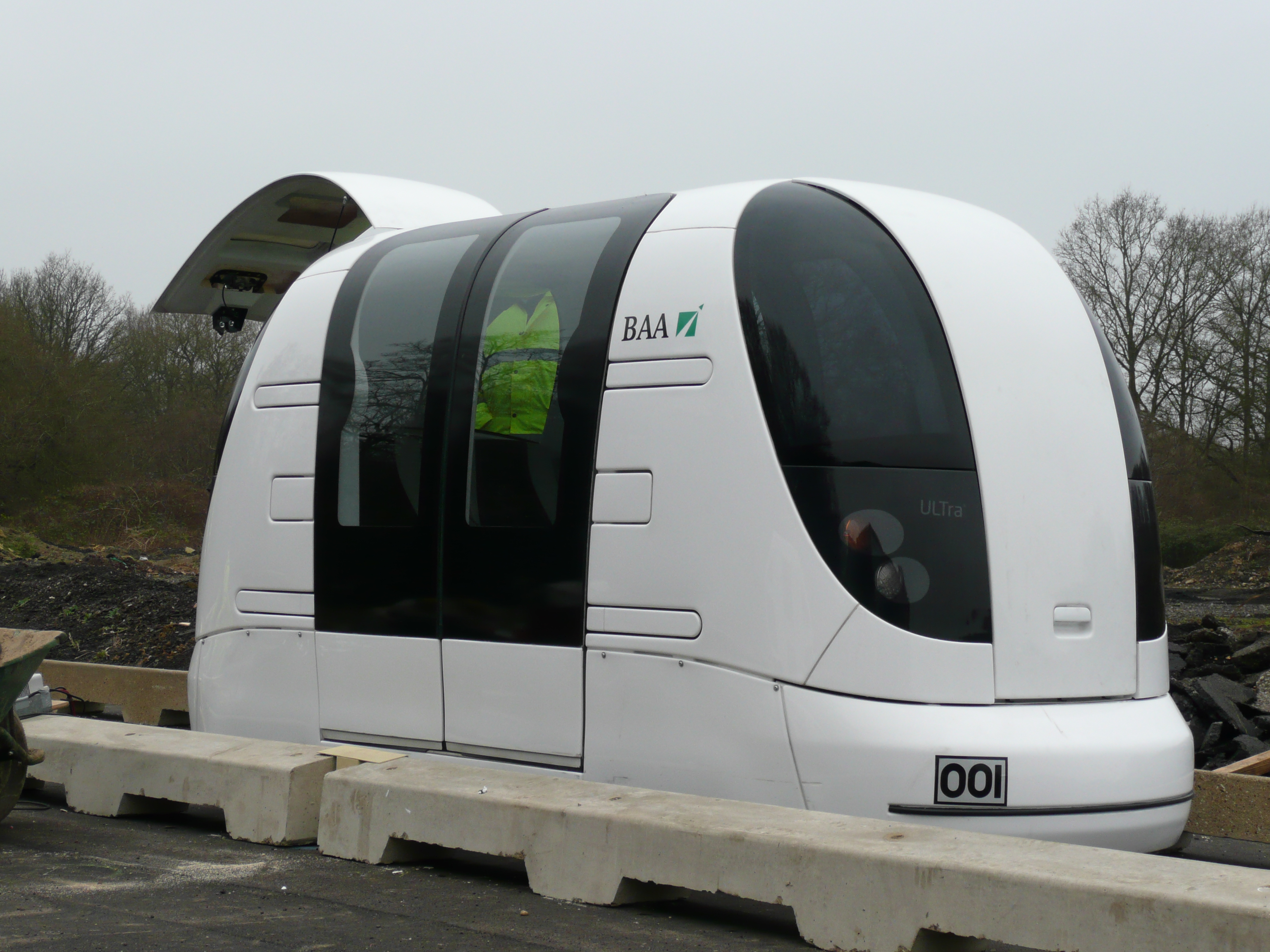
Tram-train (left) and PRT (right) options

In October 2016, plans were resurrected to build a railway link to Glasgow Airport as part of the Glasgow City Deal. A journey time of 16.5 minutes was also proposed. The outline proposals included two options:

- Light Rail Option: Cost of £144 million; Running between Glasgow Central to Glasgow Airport via Paisley Gilmour Street railway station using tram-train rolling stock.
- Personal Rapid Transit (PRT) pod option: Proposed link off the existing Inverclyde Line to the airport via a relocated Paisley St James. It was described as having the following features: Passengers would travel on the Glasgow Central/Wemyss Bay - Gourock line and disembark at a relocated Paisley St James station. They would then join the Personal rapid transit pod system and four minutes later arrive at the airport. A new station was proposed to be built at junction 29 of the M8 for interchange (relocated Paisley St James) to the existing line and then a PRT pod link to the airport.

It was claimed that either scheme could be opened by 2025.

Council leads approved the light rail option between Glasgow Airport and Glasgow Central, with construction proposed to begin in 2022 and be completed by 2025.

In 2019, the initial plans to create a direct light rail link were once again shelved. One of the reasons stated was concerns of overcrowding at Glasgow Central. A new proposal was then suggested to adopt the cheaper Personal Rapid Transit system instead between Glasgow Airport and Paisley Gilmour Street. Glasgow MP Paul Sweeney criticised Glasgow City Council leader Susan Aitken for supporting the downgraded option to use the people mover system to the airport, instead of light rail that would be integrated with the main Paisley Gilmour Street railway station and the wider city region rail network.

=== 2019 Proposal ===
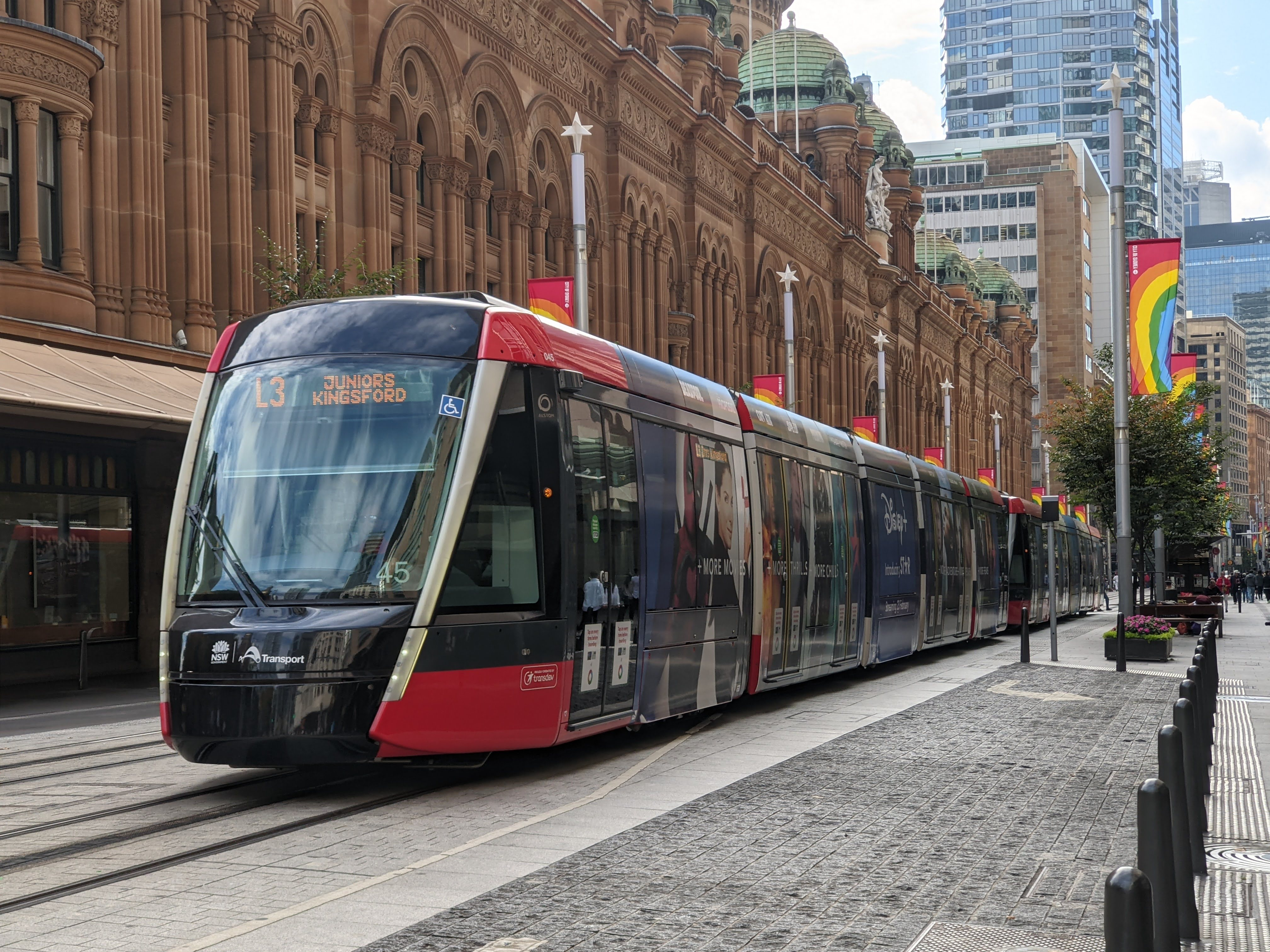
Light Rail in Sydney

In 2019 as part of a wider £10 billion plan for a 'Glasgow Metro' network, the Glasgow Connectivity Commission endorsed light rail instead of the PRT option and proposed linking Glasgow airport to Braehead and the Queen Elizabeth University Hospital with a segregated light rail line to Glasgow Central via Govan, instead of using tram-trains. The first phase was approved by Glasgow and Renfrewshire council leaders in early 2020. The initial project would link Glasgow airport to Paisley Gilmour Street train station. Construction will not begin until full approval from both councils is given.

=== Clyde Metro ===
In recent years, the 2019 plans to connect the airport have been integrated into the wider proposed Clyde Metro Project. Plans indicate that the airport would be connected with a heavy metro line.

== See also ==
- Edinburgh to Glasgow Improvement Programme
- Western Rail Approach to Heathrow
