= Glasgow Airport =

International airport in Glasgow, Scotland

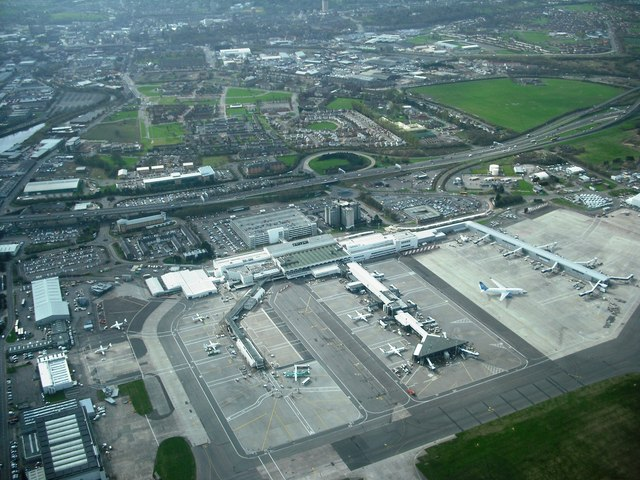
- IATA: GLA; ICAO: EGPF

Summary
- Airport type: Public
- Owner: AGS Airports
- Operator: Glasgow Airport Ltd.
- Serves: Glasgow
- Location: Paisley, Renfrewshire, Scotland, UK
- Opened: 2 May 1966; 60 years ago
- Hub for: Loganair
- Focus city for: easyJet; Jet2.com; TUI Airways
- Elevation AMSL: 26 ft (7.9 m)
- Coordinates: 55°52′19″N 004°25′59″W
- Website: www.glasgowairport.com

Map
- Location of the airport in Renfrewshire

Runways
Direction	Length		Surface
Direction	m	ft	Surface
05/23	2,665	8,743	Grooved asphalt

Statistics (2025)
- Passengers: 8,205,280
- Passenger change 24-25: ▲1.7%
- Aircraft movements: 80,008
- Movements change 24-25: ▲4%
- Sources: UK AIP at NATS; Statistics from the UK Civil Aviation Authority; Location from Glasgow Airport

Glasgow Airport, also known as Glasgow International Airport (IATA: GLA, ICAO: EGPF), and formerly Abbotsinch Airport, is an international airport located in Paisley, Renfrewshire, Scotland, 7 miles (11 km) west of Glasgow. In 2024 it handled 8.06 million passengers, a 9.6 per cent annual increase, making it the second-busiest in Scotland, after Edinburgh Airport, and the ninth-busiest in the United Kingdom.

It is owned and operated by AGS Airports, which also owns and operates Aberdeen and Southampton airports. It was previously owned and operated by Heathrow Airport Holdings (formerly known as BAA). Loganair are headquartered at the airport and have a maintenance hangar here. easyJet, Jet2.com and TUI Airways also use Glasgow as a hub. British Airways also operates a major maintenance facility for its narrowbody (Airbus A320) fleet within the airport boundary.

It was opened in 1966 and originally flights only operated to other places in the UK and Europe. It began to offer flights to elsewhere — flights that previously used Glasgow Prestwick Airport, which was subsequently relegated as the city's secondary airport catering for Ryanair and freight operators.

== History ==
The history of the present Glasgow Airport goes back to 1932, when the site at Abbotsinch, between the Black Cart Water and the White Cart Water, near Paisley in Renfrewshire, was opened. In 1933 No. 602 (City of Glasgow) Squadron AAF of the Auxiliary Air Force (present day Royal Auxiliary Air Force) moved its Westland Wapiti IIA aircraft from nearby Renfrew. The RAF Station headquarters, however, was not formed until 1 July 1936 when 6 Auxiliary Group, Bomber Command, arrived. From May 1939, until moving away in October 1939, the Squadron flew the Supermarine Spitfire.

=== 1940–1960 ===
In 1940 a torpedo training unit was formed, which trained both Royal Air Force and Royal Navy crews under RAF Coastal Command. The Admiralty was granted a lodger facility for a RN Air Section at Royal Air Force Abbotsinch from 19 June 1940. The airbase was transferred from No. 19 Group RAF to the Admiralty on 11 August 1943, known as Royal Naval Air Station Abbotsinch, (or RNAS Abbotsinch). Its primary function was an Aircraft Maintenance Yard and Reserve Aircraft Storage and Salvage. On 20 September it was commissioned HMS Sanderling. During the 1950s the airfield housed a large aircraft storage unit and squadrons of the Royal Naval Volunteer Reserve.

The Royal Navy left in October 1963. The name Sanderling was, however, retained as a link between the two: HMS Sanderling's ship's bell was presented to the new airport and a bar in the airport was named The Sanderling Bar.

The following squadrons were based at Glasgow Airport at some point:

- No. 21 Squadron RAF
- No. 34 Squadron RAF
- No. 88 Squadron RAF
- No. 225 Squadron RAF
- No. 232 Squadron RAF
- No. 239 Squadron RAF
- No. 254 Squadron RAF
- No. 269 Squadron RAF
- No. 309 Polish Fighter-Reconnaissance Squadron
- No. 414 Squadron RCAF
- No. 602 Squadron RAF
- No. 607 Squadron RAF
- No. 610 Squadron RAF
- No. 666 Squadron RAF
- 730 Naval Air Squadron
- 768 Naval Air Squadron
- 800 Naval Air Squadron
- 801 Naval Air Squadron
- 802 Naval Air Squadron
- 804 Naval Air Squadron
- 807 Naval Air Squadron
- 813 Naval Air Squadron
- 816 Naval Air Squadron
- 818 Naval Air Squadron
- 819 Naval Air Squadron
- 821 Naval Air Squadron
- 824 Naval Air Squadron
- 825 Naval Air Squadron
- 831 Naval Air Squadron
- 832 Naval Air Squadron
- 835 Naval Air Squadron
- 852 Naval Air Squadron
- 892 Naval Air Squadron
- 1702 Naval Air Squadron
- 1830 Naval Air Squadron
- 1840 Naval Air Squadron
- 1843 Naval Air Squadron

Units

- No. 2 Coastal Patrol Flight (October 1939 – May 1940)
- No. 4 Air Experience Flight RAF (January 1997 – )
- No. 4 Gliding School RAF (May 1945 – May 1951)
- No. 6 Aircraft Assembly Unit (? – 1943)
- No. 418 Flight RAF (July 1940)
- No. 663 Gliding School RAF (November 1959 – July 1962)
- No. 1441 (Combined Operations Development) Flight RAF (January–October 1942)
- No. 1680 (Western Isles Communication) Flight RAF (May 1943 – April 1944)
- No. 1967 Reserve Air Observation Post Flight RAF (December 1952 – September 1954 & September 1955 – March 1957)
- Torpedo Training Unit RAF (May 1940 – November 1942) which then moved to RAF Turnberry
- Universities of Glasgow and Strathclyde Air Squadron (January 1993 – )

=== 1960–1970 ===
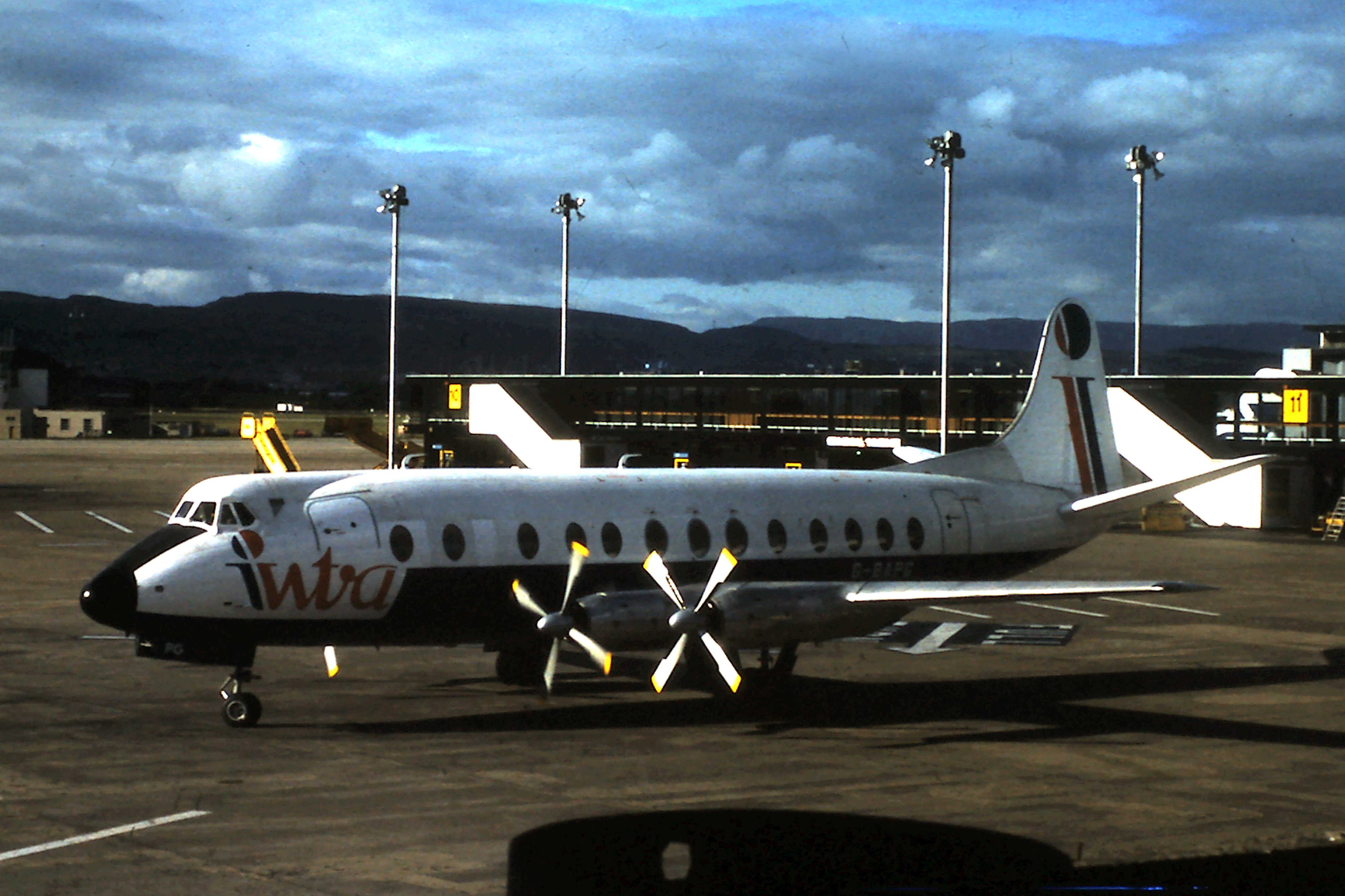
An Intra Airways Vickers Viscount at Glasgow Airport in 1979

In the 1960s Glasgow Corporation decided that a new airport for the city was required. The original site of Glasgow's main airport, Renfrew Airport, was 3 km (1.9 mi) east of the current airport, in what is now the Dean Park area of Renfrew. The original Art Deco terminal building of the original airport has not survived. The site is now occupied by a Tesco supermarket and the M8 motorway; this straight and level section of motorway occupies the site of the runway.

Abbotsinch took over from Renfrew Airport on 2 May 1966. Her Majesty's Government had already committed millions into rebuilding Glasgow Prestwick Airport fit for the "jet age". Nevertheless, the plan went forward and the new airport, designed by Basil Spence and built at a cost of £4.2 million, it was completed in 1966, with British European Airways beginning services using De Havilland Comet aircraft.

The first commercial flight to arrive was a British European Airways flight from Edinburgh, landing at 8 am on 2 May 1966. The airport was officially opened on 27 June 1966 by Queen Elizabeth II. The political rows over Glasgow and Prestwick airports continued, with Prestwick enjoying a monopoly over transatlantic traffic (under the 1946 US-UK air transport agreement known as the Bermuda Agreement), while Glasgow Airport was only allowed to handle UK and intra-European traffic.

=== 1970s–1990s ===
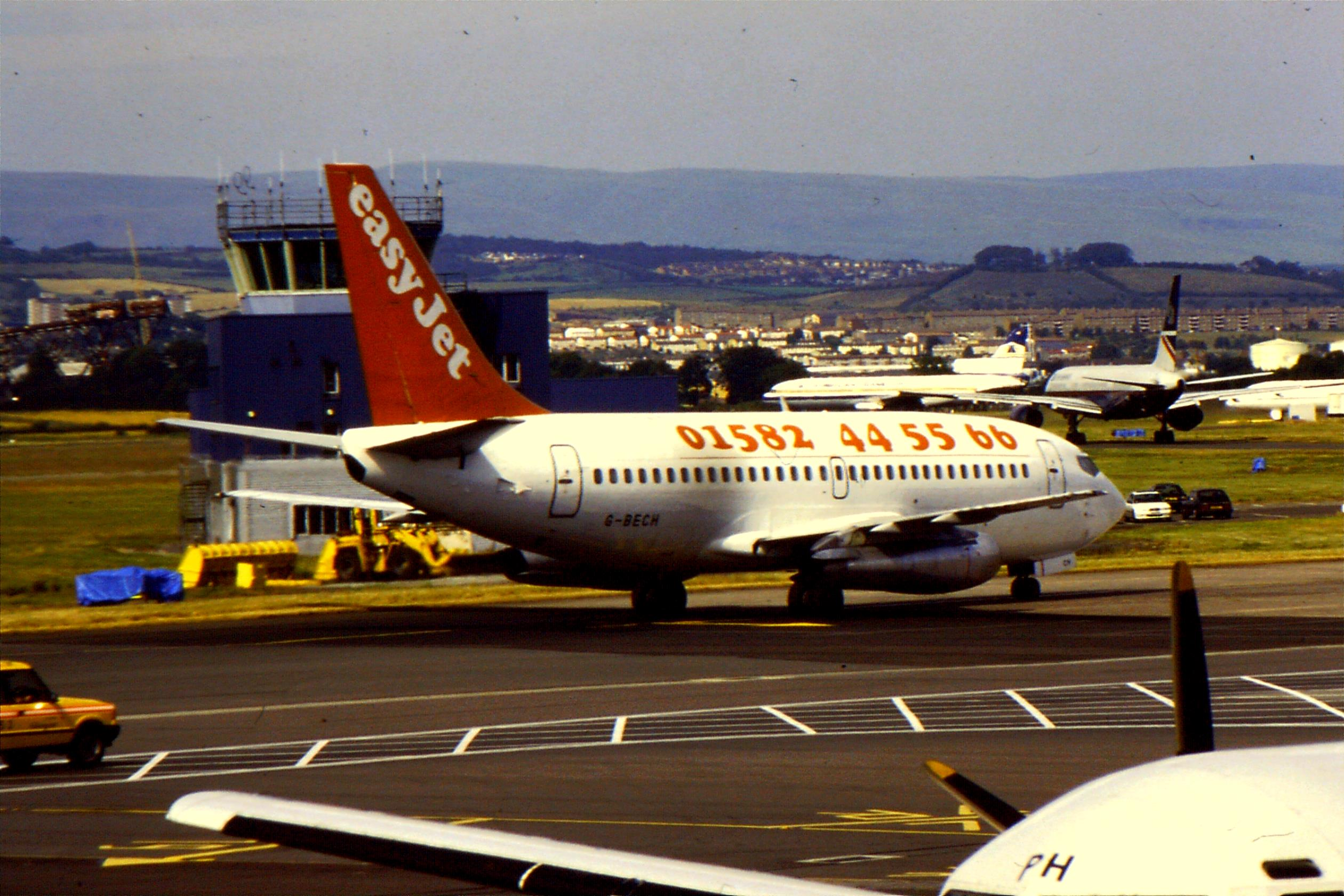
An easyJet Boeing 737-200 departing Glasgow in 1995

In 1975 the BAA took ownership of Glasgow Airport. When BAA was privatised in the late 1980s, as BAA plc, it consolidated its airport portfolio and sold Prestwick Airport. BAA embarked on a massive redevelopment plan for Glasgow Airport in 1989.

In the early 1990s Glasgow became the first UK airport, and one of the first in Europe to screen all baggage. Until this time, only 'high-risk' flights had their hand luggage and hold luggage checked. This was a result of the bombing of Pan Am Flight 103 on 21 December 1988 over the Scottish town of Lockerbie.

An extended terminal building was created by building a pre-fabricated metal structure around the front of the original Basil Spence building, hence screening much of its distinctive Brutalist style architecture from view, with the void between the two structures joined by a glass atrium and walkway. Spence's original concrete facade which once looked onto Caledonia Road now fronts the check-in desks. The original building can be seen more clearly from the rear, with the mock barrel-vaulted roof visible when airside.

A dedicated international departure lounge and pier were added at the western side of the building, leaving the facility with a total of 38 gates, bringing its capacity up to nine million passengers per year. In 2003 BAA completed redevelopment work on a satellite building (called "T2", formerly the St Andrews Building), to provide a dedicated check-in facility for low-cost airlines, principally Jet2.com.

By 1996 Glasgow was handling over 5.5 million passengers per year, making it the fourth-busiest in the UK.

=== Post-2000 ===
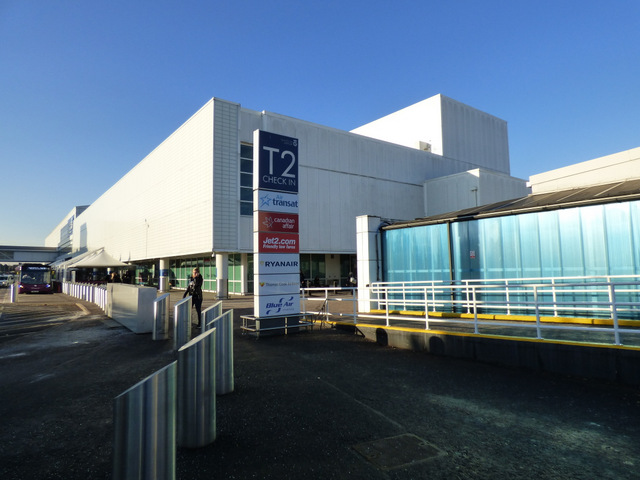
Glasgow Airport Terminal 2 (T2) building

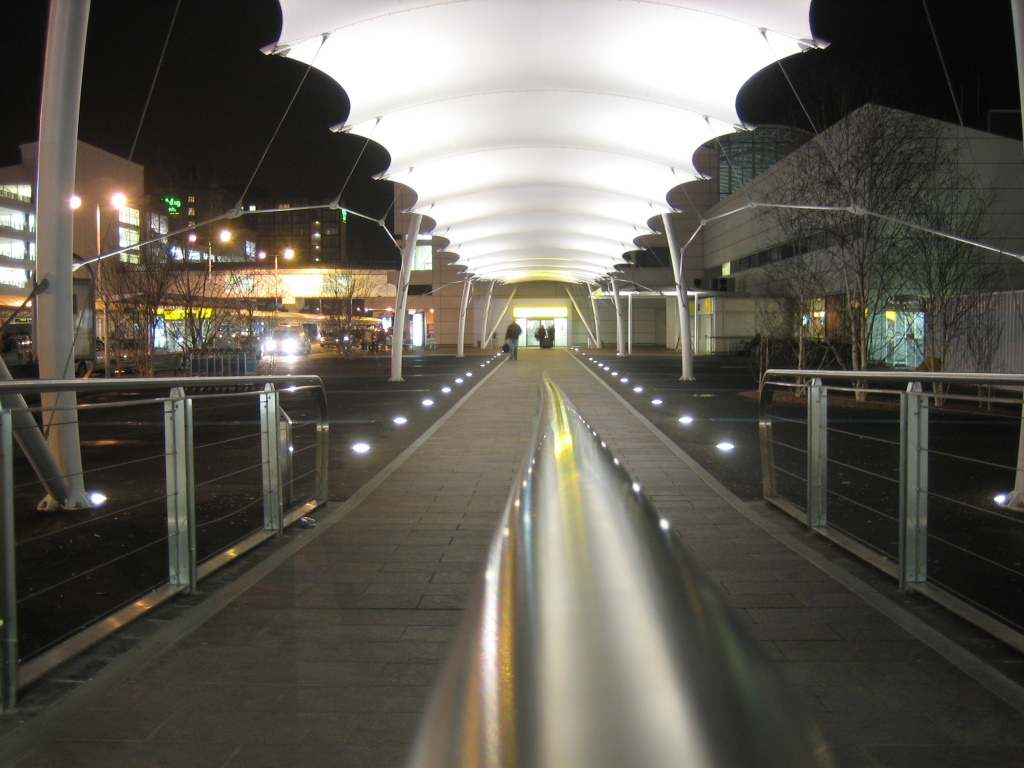
Glasgow Airport walkway

It serves a variety of destinations throughout Canada, Europe and the Middle East. The terminal consists of three piers; the West Pier, Central Pier and East Pier. The West Pier, commonly known as the International Pier, was built as part of the 1989 extension project and is the principal international and long haul departure point. All but two of the stands on this pier are equipped with airbridges. This pier has stands 27 - 36. In 2019, the pier received the ability to facilitate the Airbus A380 following an £8 million upgrade.

The Central Pier is part of the original 1966 building. The main user of the pier is British Airways, who tend to use the majority of its gates, with London shuttles (to Heathrow, Gatwick and London City) making up almost all its traffic. The British Airways lounge is located on this pier, across from gate 15. Aer Lingus, Loganair, Jet2.com and TUI Airways also operate from the central pier. Most of the stands on this pier are equipped with airbridges. This pier has stands 14–26. The now defunct airlines Flybe and British Midland (bmi) were once major users of the Central Pier.

The East Pier, constructed in the mid-1970s, was originally used for international flights but in recent years has been re-developed for use by low-cost airlines. None of the stands on this pier are equipped with airbridges. The main users of this pier are easyJet and Loganair. In 2015, a £3 million extension was added to the pier, creating space for 750,000 extra passengers a year. This pier has stands 1–12.

In late 2007 work commenced on Skyhub (located between Terminal 1 and Terminal 2) which created a single, purpose-built security screening area in place of the previous individual facilities for each of the three piers, the other side effect being an enlarged duty-free shopping area created by taking most of the previous landside shopping and restaurant facilities airside. This new arrangement also frees up space in the departure lounges through the removal of the separate duty-free shops in the West and Central Piers. This however meant that the former public viewing areas of the apron are now airside, making the airport inaccessible to aviation enthusiasts and spectators.

Future growth is hampered by the airport's location, which is constrained by the M8 motorway to the south, the town of Renfrew to the east and the River Clyde to the north. At present the areas of Drumchapel, Clydebank, Bearsden, Foxbar, Faifley and Linwood all sit directly underneath the approach paths into the airport, meaning that further increases in traffic may be politically sensitive. The airport is challenged by Edinburgh Airport, which now serves a wider range of European destinations and has grown to overtake Glasgow as Scotland's busiest airport. The Scottish Government announced in 2002 that a rail line – known as the Glasgow Airport Rail Link (GARL) – would be built from Glasgow Central station to Glasgow Airport. The rail link was to be completed by 2012 with the first trains running early in 2013. In 2009, however, it was announced by the Scottish Government that the plan had been cancelled.

Currently, the airport is easily accessible by road due with direct access to the adjoining M8 motorway. It is also served by a frequent bus service, the Glasgow Airport Express, which operates services to the city centre. The service is run by First Glasgow and all buses feature leather seats, USB charging ports and free WiFi. The airport is home to the Scottish regional airline Loganair, previously a Flybe franchise operator, who have their head office located on site. British Airways has a maintenance hangar at the airport, capable of carrying out overhaul work on Airbus A320, as well as a cargo facility. The RAF also has a unit based within the airport – The Universities of Glasgow and Strathclyde Air Squadron – to provide flying training to university students who plan to join the RAF.

In 2007 Glasgow became the second-busiest airport in Scotland as passenger numbers were surpassed by those at Edinburgh Airport.

==== 2007 terrorist attack ====
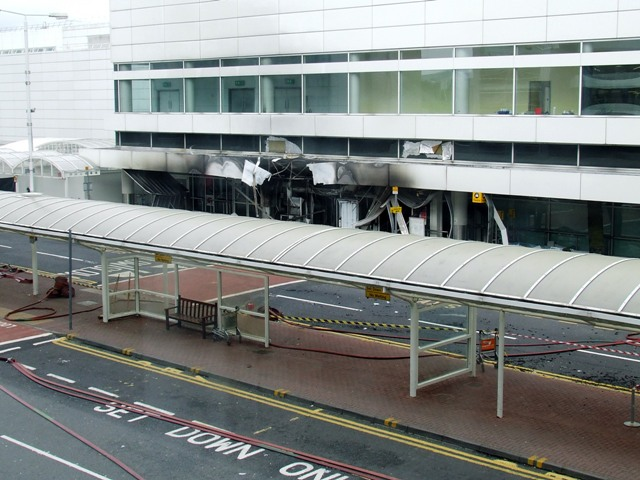
The aftermath of the 2007 Glasgow Airport attack

On 30 June 2007, a day after the failed car bomb attacks in London, an attack at Glasgow International Airport occurred. A flaming Jeep Cherokee was driven into the entrance of Main Terminal. Two men, one alight, fled the vehicle before being apprehended by a group of police officers, airport security officers and witnesses. One of the men died in the following months due to his injuries. New barriers and security measures have since been added.

==== Airline expansion ====
Icelandair temporarily moved its base of operations from Keflavík International Airport to Glasgow due to the 2010 eruptions of Eyjafjallajökull.

On 10 April 2014 the airline Emirates operated an Airbus A380 to Glasgow to celebrate the 10th anniversary of the Glasgow–Dubai route, and was the first time an A380 had visited a Scottish airport.

In July 2014 Emirates opened a dedicated lounge at the airport for First and Business class passengers. It is located at the top of the West Pier. In October 2014 Heathrow Airport Holdings reached an agreement to sell the airport, together with Southampton and Aberdeen, to a consortium of Ferrovial and Macquarie Group for £1 billion.

In 2017 easyJet became the first airline to carry more than one million passengers from the airport in a period of 12 months.

In 2026, German flag carrier Lufthansa temporarily suspended flights to Glasgow, due to the sharp rise in fuel costs caused by the ongoing conflict in Iran, the airline is working to restore the route as soon as possible, but has paused all sale on the route for the winter season.

== Airlines and destinations ==
=== Passenger ===
The following airlines operate regular scheduled flights to and from Glasgow:

Airlines	Destinations
Aer Lingus	Belfast–City, Cork, Dublin
Air Charter Scotland	Wick
Air Transat	Toronto–Pearson
British Airways	London–City, London–Gatwick, London–Heathrow; Seasonal: Nice (begins 16 May 2027), Palma de Mallorca, San Sebastián
Corendon Airlines	Seasonal: Antalya
Discover Airlines	Frankfurt (begins 29 March 2027); Seasonal: Munich (begins 16 May 2027)
easyJet	Alicante, Amsterdam, Antalya, Barcelona, Belfast–City, Belfast–International, Birmingham, Bristol, Enfidha, Faro, Hurghada, Jersey, Lisbon, London–Gatwick, London–Luton, London–Stansted, Málaga, Paris–Charles de Gaulle, Prague, Rome–Fiumicino, Sharm El Sheikh, Southampton; Seasonal: Agadir, Berlin, Bordeaux, Chania, Dalaman, Fuerteventura, Geneva, Gran Canaria, Kos, Lanzarote, Larnaca, Malta, Marrakesh, Palma de Mallorca, Pisa, Porto, Pula, Reus, Split, Tenerife–South
Edelweiss Air	Seasonal: Zurich
Emirates	Dubai–International
Eurowings	Seasonal: Hannover
Icelandair	Reykjavík–Keflavík
Jet2.com	Agadir, Alicante, Antalya, Faro, Fuerteventura, Funchal, Gran Canaria, Hurghada (begins 11 February 2027), Lanzarote, Málaga, Marrakesh, Rome–Fiumicino Tenerife–South; Seasonal: Berlin, Bodrum, Budapest, Burgas, Corfu, Dalaman, Dubrovnik, Geneva, Girona, Heraklion, Ibiza, İzmir, Kefalonia, Kos, Kraków, Larnaca, Malta, Menorca, Naples, Palma de Mallorca, Paphos, Prague, Reus, Reykjavík–Keflavík, Rhodes, Verona, Vienna, Zakynthos
KLM	Amsterdam
Loganair	Barra, Benbecula, Campbeltown, Derry, Donegal, Islay, Kirkwall, Stornoway, Sumburgh, Tiree; Seasonal: Newquay
Norwegian Air Shuttle	Seasonal: Tromsø (begins 11 December 2026)
Ryanair	Alicante, Dublin, Kraków, London–Stansted, Málaga, Malta, Warsaw–Modlin, Wrocław
TUI Airways	Alicante, Gran Canaria, Lanzarote, Sal, Sharm El Sheikh, Tenerife–South; Seasonal: Barbados, Cancún, Chambéry, Corfu, Dalaman, Dubrovnik, Enfidha, Ibiza, Kittilä, La Romana, Málaga, Melbourne/Orlando, Menorca, Naples, Palma de Mallorca, Paphos, Reus, Rhodes, Salzburg, Turin, Verona, Zakynthos
United Airlines	Seasonal: Newark

=== Cargo ===
Airlines	Destinations
Loganair	Kirkwall, Stornoway, Sumburgh

== General aviation ==
=== Gama aviation and air ambulance ===
The Scottish Air Ambulance Services (SAS) contract involves the provision of fixed-wing aircraft and helicopters in addition to the coordination and operational management of all flights. This long-term contract resulted in the company investing in the development of new infrastructure at the airport, with the creation of the Scottish Specialist Transport and Retrieval (ScotSTAR) facility.

== Future ==
=== Investment area ===
The Glasgow Airport Investment Area is a £39.1 million project to administer infrastructure and environmental improvements in the surrounding airport area to facilitate the development of a world-class business and commercial hub in the heart of Renfrewshire.

There are plans for a new bridge connecting Paisley town centre and Gilmour Street Station with the airport as part of the larger £59 million AMIDS South project. The bridge is planned to be operational by 2028.

=== Expansion plans ===
In 2005 BAA published a consultation paper for the development of the airport. The consultation paper included proposals for a second runway parallel to and to the north-west of the existing runway 05/23; redevelopment and enlargement of the East (low-cost) pier to connect directly with Terminal 2; and an additional International Pier to the west of the existing International Pier. There were plans for a new rail terminal, joined to the airport's passenger terminal and Multistorey car park. On 29 November 2006 the Scottish Parliament gave the go-ahead for the new railway station as part of the Glasgow Airport Rail Link to Glasgow Central station, originally due for completion in 2011. However, on 17 September 2009 the rail link was cancelled as part of public spending cuts and escalating costs.

BAA's plans, which are expected to cost some £290 million over the next 25 years, come in response to a forecasted trebling of annual passenger numbers passing through the airport by 2030. The current figure of 9.4 million passengers passing through the airport is expected to rise to more than 24 million by 2030.

As of late 2017, there were plans to build a light rail link that will connect the city centre to the airport via Govan, with plans already underway to begin construction of the project after the cancellation of the original Glasgow Airport Rail Link project. Since then this plan has been implemented into the larger Clyde Metro project.

On 23 March 2025, AviAlliance announced that it would be investing £350 million across AGS Airports, with the majority being invested in Glasgow Airport. Plans include work to enable arriving aircraft to be turned around faster, expanding the airside part of the terminal beyond security to add more shops and places to eat and drink, the west end of the check-in hall to be expanded, along with the T2 check in area at the east end of the building. The three piers of aircraft boarding gates will be overhauled for the first time in 30 years. This work was due to commence in 2030, will now start in 2025 and is scheduled to be completed by 2027.

=== Proposed rail/metro link ===
Proposed alignment for the Glasgow Airport Rail Link

Plans for a rail link from the airport to Glasgow Central railway station were proposed in the 2000s, shelved in 2009 and then resurrected in December 2016; though progress towards the proposal has yet to come to fruition. In recent years a Larger scale plan known as Clyde Metro, currently in the planning stages aims to create a new metro system for the Glasgow city region which includes a link to the airport, the plan previously being proposed and led by Transport Scotland is now being developed by Strathclyde Partnership for Transport and is currently in the case for investment stage.

== Statistics ==
=== Annual traffic ===
Traffic by calendar year
Year	Passengers	Aircraft movements	Cargo (tonnes)
2000	6,965,500	104,929	8,545
2001	7,292,327	110,408	5,928
2002	7,803,627	104,393	5,041
2003	8,129,713	105,597	4,927
2004	8,575,039	107,885	8,122
2005	8,792,915	110,581	8,733
2006	8,848,755	110,034	6,289
2007	8,795,653	108,305	4,276
2008	8,178,891	100,087	3,546
2009	7,225,021	85,281	2,334
2010	6,548,865	77,755	2,914
2011	6,880,217	78,111	2,430
2012	7,157,859	80,472	9,497
2013	7,363,764	79,520	11,837
2014	7,715,988	84,000	15,411
2015	8,714,307	90,790	13,193
2016	9,327,193	98,217	12,921
2017	9,902,239	102,766	15,935
2018	9,698,862	97,157	15,466
2019	8,843,241	91,812	12,822
2020	1,944,981	34,715	6,601
2021	2,071,008	39,713	5,436
2022	6,516,029	70,391	6,618
2023	7,355,987	74,563	5,516
2024	8,064,791	76,916	6,531
2025	8,205,280	80,008	6,420
Source: CAA Statistics

=== Busiest routes ===
Busiest international routes from Glasgow (2025)
Rank	Destination	Passengers	Change 2024 to 2025
1	Dublin	524,518	▲4%
2	Amsterdam	418,164	▼4%
3	Dubai	316,335	▼6%
4	Tenerife–South	273,491	▼4%
5	Málaga	258,133	▲7%
6	Alicante	257,995	▲3%
7	Paris-Charles de Gaulle	211,890	▲14%
8	Palma de Mallorca	205,994	▲5%
9	Antalya	167,788	▲17%
10	Frankfurt (Main)	156,024	▲1%
Source: CAA Statistics

Busiest domestic routes from Glasgow (2025)
Rank	Destination	Passengers	Change 2024 to 2025
1	London–Heathrow	959,919	▲1%
2	London–Gatwick	429,579	▼6%
3	Belfast–International	308,571	Steady
4	Bristol	295,945	▲1%
5	London–Luton	276,405	▲8%
6	London–City	221,193	▲6%
7	London–Stansted	215,207	▼4%
8	Birmingham	157,084	▼4%
9	Belfast–City	100,655	▼10%
10	Southampton	97,226	▲1%
Source: CAA Statistics

== Accidents and incidents ==
- A Norwegian Arado Ar 196A crashed near Glasgow in April 1940.
- On 3 September 1999, a Cessna 404 carrying nine Airtours staff from Glasgow to Aberdeen on a transfer flight, crashed minutes after takeoff near the town of Linwood, Renfrewshire. Eight people were killed and three seriously injured. No one on the ground was hurt. The Air Accident Investigation Branch determined the aircraft had developed an engine malfunction during takeoff. Although the captain decided to return to the airfield, he mistakenly identified the working engine as the faulty one and shut it down, causing the aircraft to crash. A fatal accident inquiry was also held, which reached the same conclusion.
- On 30 June 2007, a group of extremists attacked the airport by ramming a Jeep Cherokee into the entrance of the main terminal which set the car on fire. There was some damage to the airport. One of the perpetrators died in hospital and the others were jailed.
- In August 2019, two intoxicated United Airlines pilots tried to fly a plane to Newark, United States, but were stopped by local authorities and arrested.

== Ground transport ==
=== Bus ===
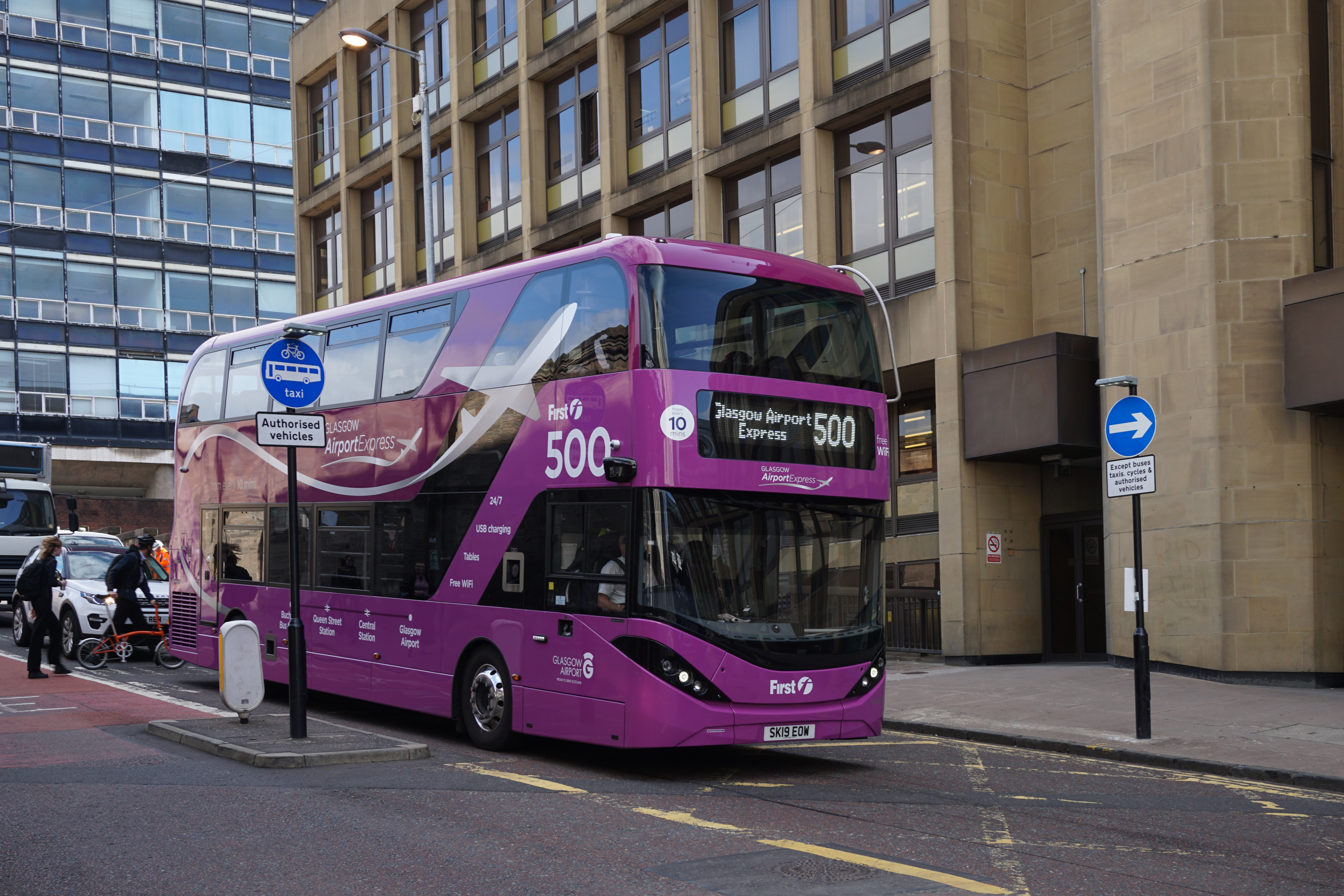
First Glasgow Airport Express bus

The airport is linked to Glasgow city centre by the Glasgow Airport Express (route 500) service, operated by First Glasgow under contract to Glasgow Airport, using a fully electric fleet. Started in 2011, the service runs direct via the M8 motorway.

Other services include route 757, linking the airport with Paisley, Erskine and Clydebank, and route 77 to the city centre via Renfrew and Partick.

Longer distance coach services also operate from the airport, with FlixBus operating services to Aberdeen via Stirling, Perth, and Dundee; Ember operating to Fort William and Oban; and Scottish Citylink to Edinburgh and South Lanarkshire. In addition, limited Scottish Citylink services stop at the airport en route between Glasgow and Campbeltown, Oban, and the Isle of Skye.

=== Road ===
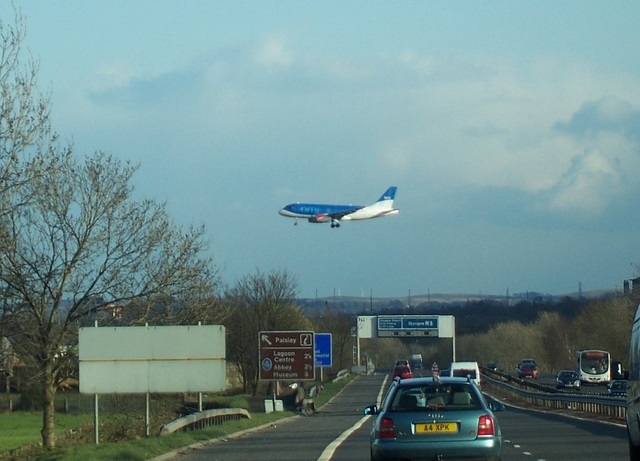
M8 motorway approaching Glasgow Airport

Glasgow Airport is the only airport in Scotland with direct motorway access, being right next to the M8 motorway providing easy access to the UK motorway network.

=== Rail ===
The closest railway station to the airport is Paisley Gilmour Street with easy access for walking and cycling, or via bus 757 from the terminal to the station.
