= BAA USA =

Former American airports subsidiary

- BAA logo
- Company type: Subsidiary
- Industry: Aviation
- Founded: 1992; 34 years ago
- Defunct: 2010; 16 years ago
- Fate: Bought out
- Headquarters: Pittsburgh, United States
- Products: AirMall
- Parent: BAA

BAA USA, also referred to as just BAA in the United States, was an American airports subsidiary owned by the British airports operator BAA. At its peak, BAA USA owned AirMall as well as the airside shopping outlets and management contracts for several American airports. It was set up in 1992 and operated each airport under a subsidiary company with BAA affixed to the name of the city. It was bought out by Prospect Capital Corporation in 2010 who renamed it AirMall USA as part of a BAA asset stripping policy.

== History ==
BAA was a privatised company created from the British Airports Authority government department. Though they were a private company, they were regulated by the Airports Act 1986 which put restrictions on the amount BAA could charge in the United Kingdom for airport services. BAA USA was set up as a way for BAA to gain income without limitations.

In 1992, they outbid four American contractors to win the right to run the retail outlets at Pittsburgh International Airport, which they did under a brand called AirMall. They implemented a rule stating that the shops airside could not charge more for a product than they charged outside the airport. They also located their headquarters at Pittsburgh Airport. In 1994, they won a management contract for Indianapolis International Airport. In 1995, they made a $66 million profit. In 1997, they took over management of Harrisburg International Airport. In 1998 they also signed a management contract with Newark International Airport and a concessions one with Logan International Airport in 2000.

== New York and final years ==
In 2000, as part of a long-running dispute between the Port Authority of New York and New Jersey and New York City, the Mayor of New York City Rudy Giuliani threatened to award BAA USA the management contracts for John F. Kennedy International Airport and LaGuardia Airport with the intended view that BAA USA would eventually buy the airports. Giuliani eventually did award the contracts to BAA USA. In response, the Port Authority cancelled BAA USA's contract with Newark, which Mayor Giuliani accused of being a "vindictive" move. In 2001, BAA USA's contract with Harrisburg Airport was terminated by the Susquehanna Area Regional Airport Authority due to failing to provide workers' compensation and failing to meet promised targets. BAA USA sued over this and despite an injunction being denied, it was settled out of court with BAA USA being given $650,000 in compensation. All BAA USA employees at Harrisburg were retained except for the director. The plans to take over the New York airports also fell through after Giuliani's successor as Mayor, Michael Bloomberg signed an extension to the Port Authority's lease.

In 2005, they ran Baltimore/Washington International Airport after winning the contract to run the concessions. In 2008, BAA USA won the concessions contract for Cleveland Airport under their AirMall brand. However, later in the year, BAA had announced a plan to sell off "non-core assets" following a British Competition Commission ruling that BAA had to sell some of their British airports. By 2010, it was announced that BAA USA had been sold for $50 million to Prospect Capital Corporation who announced they would rename BAA USA to AirMall USA.
