= Compass Centre =

Office building in London Heathrow Airport

Coordinates: 51.4809°N 0.4689°W

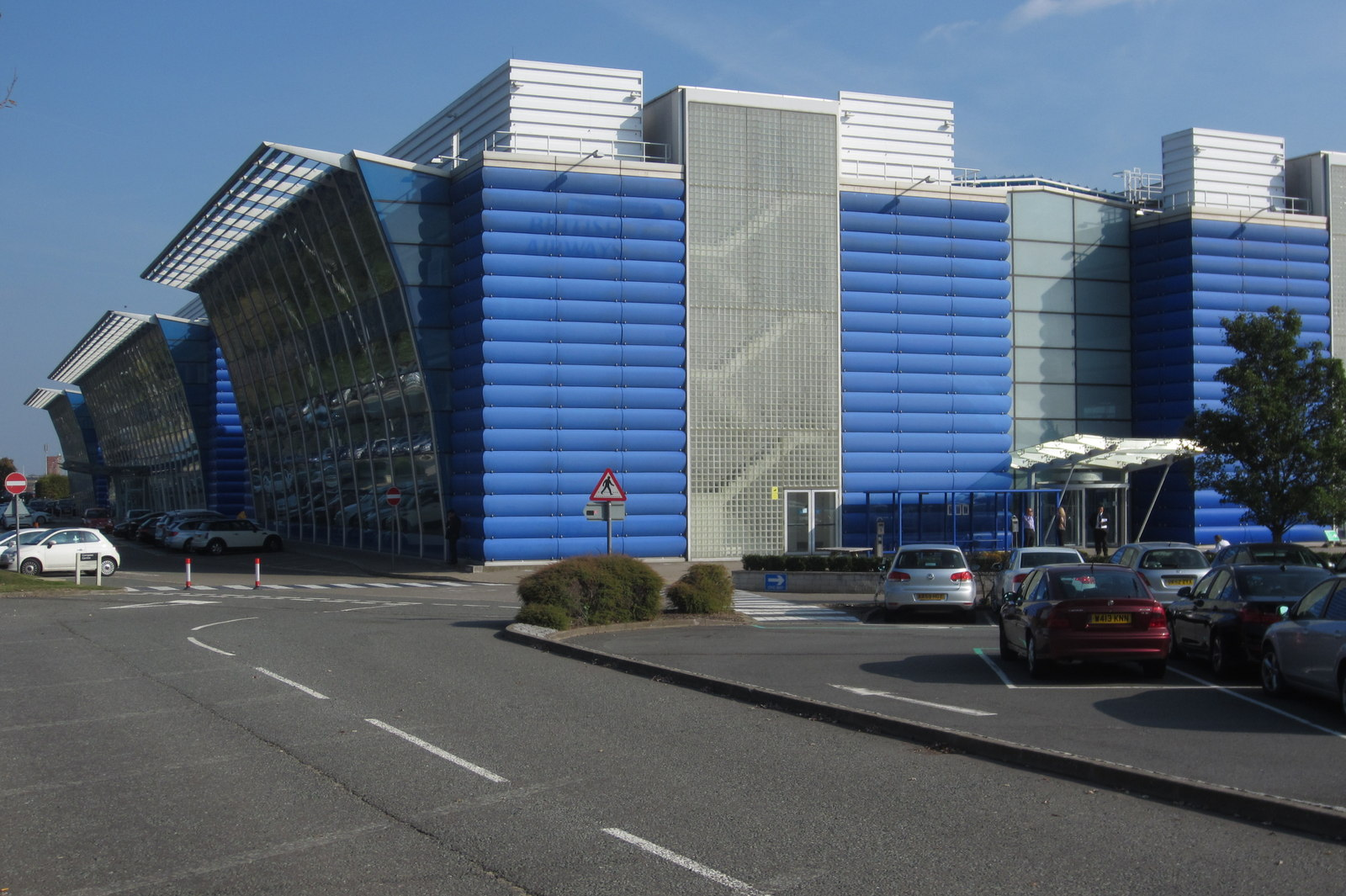
Compass Centre

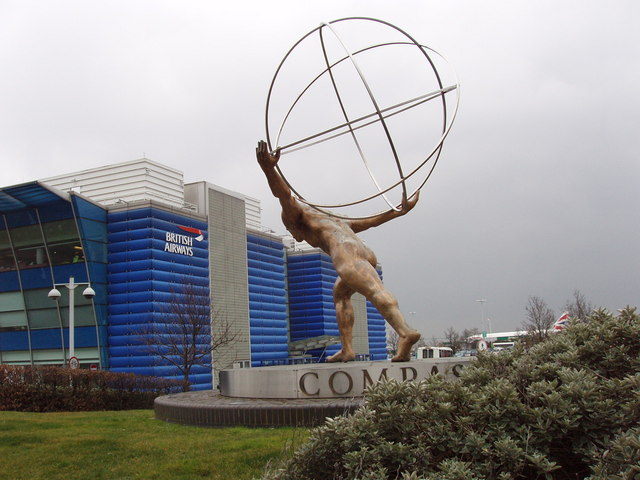
The Compass Centre, when it was a British Airways facility

Compass Centre is an office building on the grounds of Heathrow Airport in the London Borough of Hillingdon. The building serves as Heathrow Airport Holdings's head office. Compass Centre previously served as a British Airways flight crew centre.

== History ==
The Compass Centre was originally conceived as speculative offices for Lynton plc, which was the property development division of Heathrow Airport Limited. British Airways was a prospective but not necessarily a sole tenant. The airline decided to consolidate its scattered operations into the Compass Centre. In August 1992 on-site construction began. The building was completed 15 months later.

When Heathrow Terminal 5 opened on 27 March 2008, British Airways staff, including crew check-in staff, relocated from the Compass Centre to Terminal 5. A refurbishment of the head office was completed in September 2009, after Heathrow Airport Limited (then BAA) moved into the building.

On 5 March 2019, an explosive package was mailed to Compass Centre which ignited upon opening. No-one was injured in the attack. The package, one of three sent at the same time to Heathrow Airport, London City Airport and Waterloo station, was believed to have originated from Ireland. Compass Centre was evacuated for the day but reopened the following morning.

== Location and design ==
The Compass Centre was designed by Nicholas Grimshaw & Partners, which designed the core, external works, and shell of the building. Compass Centre is alongside but slightly askew from Heathrow's northern runway, with the Northern Perimeter Road, T5 Long Stay car park and Compass Centre car park between the runway and the Compass Centre. In 1995 Penny McGuire of The Architectural Review said that "Its shining glass and bright blue clad exterior reminds you, particularly when seen glowing at night, that one of the largest and busiest airports in the world is otherwise encumbered with a really grim collection of buildings. Decent ones are a rare sight around here." It was designed to house up to 800 British Airways employees. British Airways wanted a large, on-airport facility close to its operations, so it decided to use the Compass Centre.

Compass Centre consists of a linear arrangement of three connected blocks; East, Meridian (placed in the middle) and West, with Meridian slightly larger than the other two. Each block has three floors and is split again into North and South sides, with Meridian having a glass atrium. The arrangement provides a claimed 200,000 square feet (19,000 m^{2}) of office space.

The design stems from a client's request for a building that could be easily divided between tenants. The building can accommodate sub-letting and flexibility involving several tenants. Reinforced concrete was used to construct the structural frame due to economy, fire resistance, and speed. The frame has a raked roof slab and circular columns. Glass was the primary material used to construct the shell, because glass has little radar interference, and in the words of McGuire, can be "acoustically efficient." The design limits heat gain and solar glare, and the building environment is sound-proofed.

The British Council for Offices awarded the building the "Best Delivered Workplace." In 2008, ownership passed from BAA to Arora Group, and in 2021, it was sold to Prologis.

== Facilities ==
The building has its own restaurant on the first floor of the West Block, and a Caffe Nero concession on the Meridian ground floor under the glass atrium. The Meridian ground floor also houses a visitors suite with a number of meeting rooms secured separately to the staff-only access of the rest of the building. The ground floor of West block is normally used as a training centre with its own entrance and reception. During the COVID-19 pandemic, West Block was reconfigured for the vaccination rollout, handling more than 100,000 people in less than 2 years.

Compass Centre also hosts Heathrow Airport's Operation Centre (second floor, East Block). Opened in 2014, it hosts all the key functions of the airport (Security, Engineering, Police, Fire, IT etc.) in one place, along with a video wall containing 60 flatscreen panels.
