= Colin Matthews (businessman) =

British businessman

Colin Stephen Matthews CBE FREng (born 20 April 1956) is a British businessman, and was the Chairman of Highways England from 2014 to 2020; and EDF Energy.

== Early life ==
He attended the independent Oundle School in north Northamptonshire. He is the son of Sir Peter Matthews, the former boss of Vickers, and was born in Canada. He holds dual Canadian-British nationality.

In 1977 he gained a First Class MA degree in Engineering from the University of Cambridge. In 1984 he gained an MBA from INSEAD, a famous business school in France. He became a Chartered Engineer.

== Career ==
He started out on an engineering apprenticeship at Lucas Girling, a brakes manufacturer, in Birmingham, in 1977.

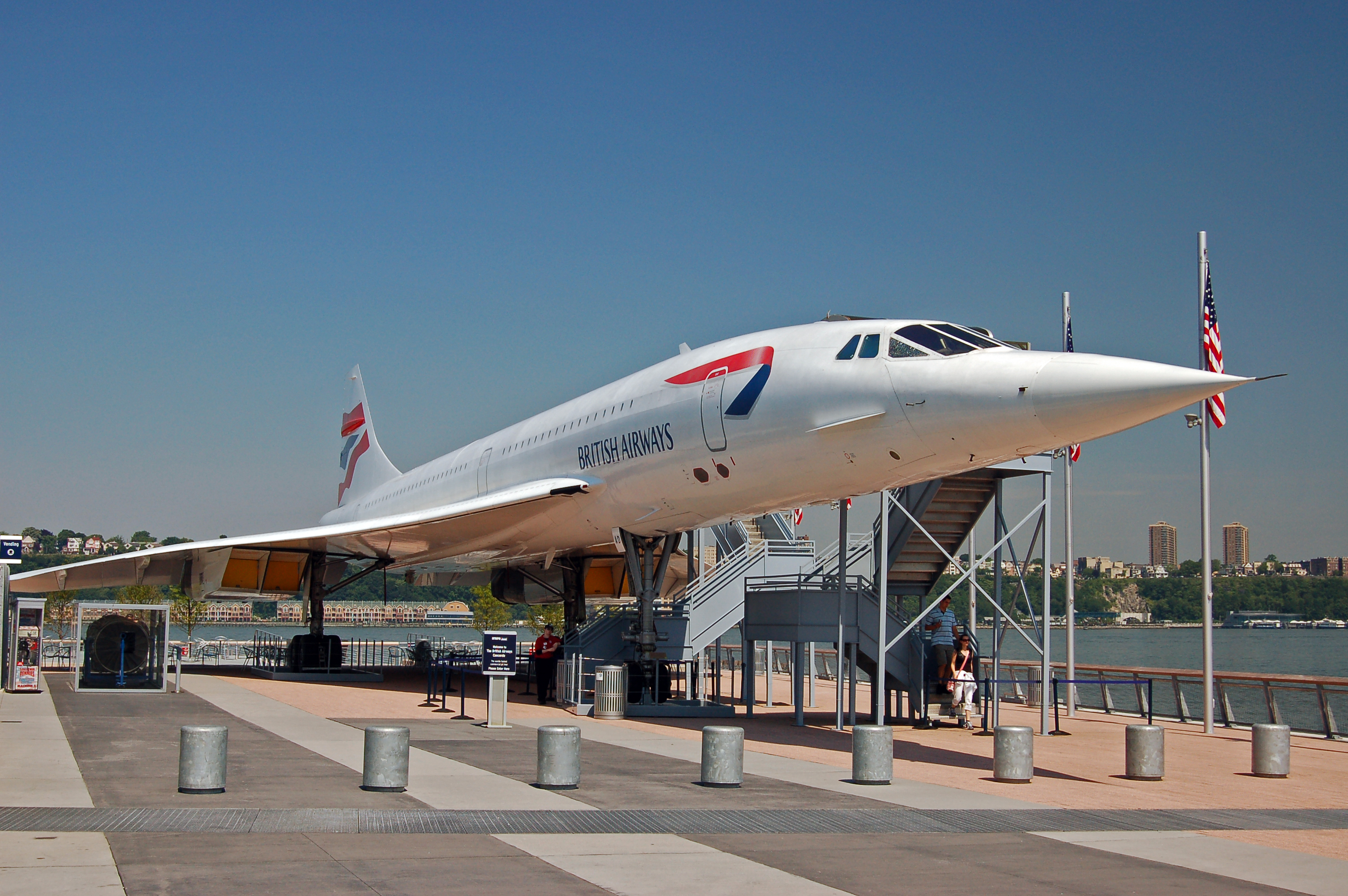
As Technical Director of British Airways in 2000 he tried unsuccessfully to keep Concorde flying

=== General Electric ===
He joined GE in 1988.

=== British Airways ===
In 1997 he became Managing Director of the engineering division of British Airways. As Technical Director, he left British Airways in 2001.

=== BAA ===
In 2008 he became Chief Executive of BAA plc, renamed Heathrow Airport Holdings in 2012. He announced his resignation from Heathrow Airport Holdings on 1 April 2014 when he announced he would leave the company later that year. Heathrow is Europe's busiest airport.

=== Highways England ===
On 21 July 2014 he was appointed as Chairman of the Highways Agency, which became Highways England in December 2014. He took up his position at the Highways Agency on 1 September 2014. As of 2015, Matthews was paid a salary of between £130,000 and £134,999 by the agency for his part-time role, making him one of the 328 most highly paid people in the British public sector at that time.

== Personal life ==
He is married with four children. He has a French wife, Florence. In 2015 he became a Fellow of the Royal Academy of Engineering. He lives in the London Borough of Richmond upon Thames, with another house in France. He enjoys sailing in Cornwall. He is a devout Christian.

== See also ==
- Jim O'Sullivan, Chief Executive of Highways England since July 2015, who also came from BAA plc, and a former Chief Engineer of Concorde.

Business positions
Preceded by	Chief Executive of BAA plc April 2008 - June 2014	Succeeded by John Holland-Kaye
Preceded by Alan Cook	Chairman of Highways England; September 2014 -	Succeeded by Incumbent
