= Southampton Airport =

Airport in Southampton, England

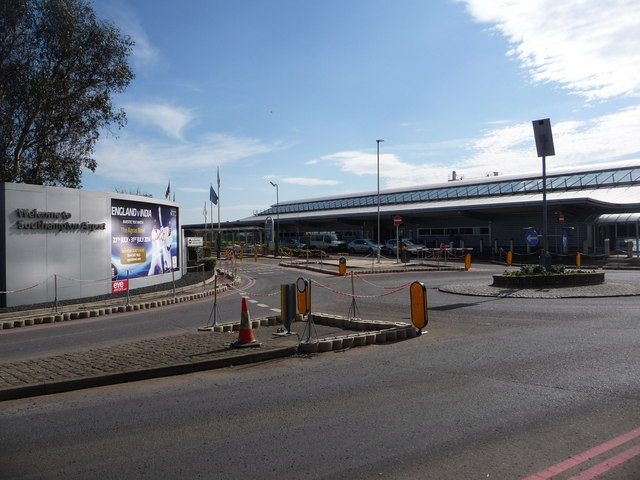
- IATA: SOU; ICAO: EGHI

Summary
- Airport type: Public
- Owner: AGS Airports
- Operator: Southampton International Airport Ltd.
- Serves: South of England
- Location: Eastleigh, Hampshire, England
- Opened: 1917; 109 years ago
- Focus city for: easyJet
- Operating base for: Aurigny
- Elevation AMSL: 44 ft (13 m)
- Coordinates: 50°57′01″N 001°21′24″W
- Website: www.southamptonairport.com

Map
- Location in Hampshire SOU/EGHI (England)

Runways
| Direction | Length | | Surface |
| Direction | m | ft | Surface |
|---|---|---|---|
| 02/20 | 1,887 | 6,191 | Asphalt |

Statistics (2025)
- Passengers: 885,266
- Passenger change 24-25: ▲3.8%
- Aircraft movements: 20,092
- Movements change 24-25: ▼6%
- Source: United Kingdom AIP; Statistics from the UK Civil Aviation Authority

Southampton Airport (IATA: SOU, ICAO: EGHI) is an international airport located in both Eastleigh and Southampton, (Note: The airport has a Southampton postal address, but parts of the site fall within both Eastleigh and Southampton administrative areas. Responsibility is divided between Southampton City Council and Eastleigh Borough Council.) Hampshire, in England. The airport is located 3.5 nautical miles (6.5 km; 4.0 mi) north-northeast of central Southampton.

Southampton Airport has a CAA Public Use Aerodrome Licence (Number P690) that allows flights for the public transport of passengers or for flying instruction. It is owned and operated by AGS Airports.

== History ==
Aviation began at the site in 1910, when pioneer pilot Edwin Rowland Moon used the meadows belonging to North Stoneham Farm as a takeoff and landing spot for his monoplane, Moonbeam Mk II. The site became known as Eastleigh Airfield.

=== First World War ===
The Royal Flying Corps earmarked the site as an aircraft acceptance base during the First World War, but when forces from the United States Navy Air Service (NAS) arrived in 1917 it was handed over to them and designated NAS Eastleigh. Work on the building of hangars which had begun under the Royal Flying Corps was accelerated. At the peak of the American presence, 4,000 officers and men were billeted in tents and huts along the adjacent London to Southampton railway line.

=== Inter-War years ===
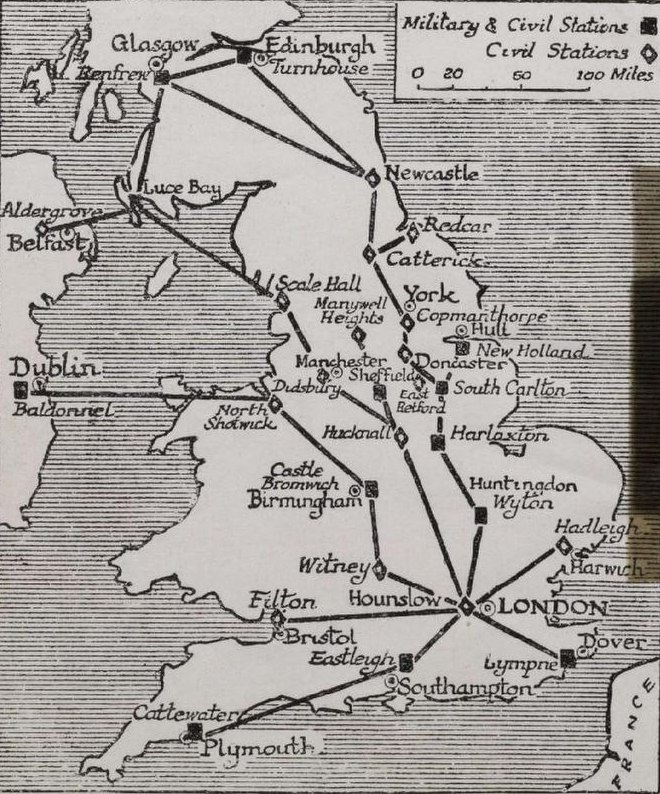
Map of Air Routes and Landing Places in Great Britain, as temporarily arranged by the Air Ministry for civilian flying, published in 1919, showing Eastleigh as a military and civil station.

After the war, the site became a transit camp for refugees, mainly Russian, who wished to sail to America from the port of Southampton. Shipping companies Cunard and White Star Line (the Oceanic Steam Navigation Company), together with the Canadian Pacific Railway, formed the Atlantic Park Hostel Company to house them temporarily. In 1921, the hangars were converted into dormitories, kitchens and dining rooms.

The hostel was intended as a short-term clearing house for those trans-migrants changing ships, but following changes to United States immigration law which restricted entry under national origins quotas, some residents were forced to stay much longer. In 1924, about 980 Ukrainian Jewish would-be emigrants were cared for at the hostel. Some of them were still there seven years later, stranded between the US and UK which would not accept them, and unable to return to the countries they had fled. Atlantic Park had a school, library, and synagogue; the refugees formed football teams that played local sides and took part in local events, such as Eastleigh carnival. At the height of its use, 20,000 passed through Atlantic Park in 1928, but then numbers started to fall away, leading to the closure of the hostel in 1931.

In 1932, Southampton Corporation purchased the site, and it became Southampton Municipal Airport. This was allowed for by the Southampton Corporation Act 1931, which allowed for the creation of a public aerodrome. By 1935, part of the site was being used by the Royal Air Force (RAF) and was briefly known as RAF Eastleigh before it became RAF Southampton in 1936. Also in 1936, Supermarine opened a flight test facility on the site and built a large new flight shed at the south end of the aerodrome in 1937–1938, and construction of the vast Cunliffe-Owen Aircraft factory between this and Wide Lane soon followed. The latter factory was better known post-war for production of the Ford Motor Company's Transit vans until this finally closed in 2013 – leaving only the almost forgotten Supermarine Flight Shed which had accommodated so many Spitfires locally before their first flights and deliveries to the RAF. Sadly, despite its obvious historical significance, this 84-year-old building is now set for demolition and redevelopment with modern industrial units.

=== Second World War ===
The first test flight of the Supermarine Spitfire took place at the airport on 5 March 1936, an event commemorated in 2004 by the erection of a two-thirds-size sculpture of K5054, the prototype Spitfire, at the road entrance. On 5 March 2006, five restored Spitfires took off from Southampton Airport to commemorate the 70th anniversary of the first test flight of the Spitfire. The local council wanted to rename the airport after R. J. Mitchell, designer of the Spitfire. However, the airport owner at the time, Heathrow Airport Holdings, did not agree.

The military site was transferred to naval command in 1939, renamed RNAS Eastleigh (HMS Raven), and spent most of the war in a ground and air training role for the Royal Navy. Owing to the 'HMS' designation in the airport's name, Nazi propaganda inaccurately reported that HMS Raven had been sunk when a bombing raid hit the airport. It passed back into civilian ownership in April 1946.

=== Development after the Second World War ===
The Cierva Autogiro Company rented portions of the Cunliffe-Owen plants from 1946, but had to move to another location on the field when it was acquired by Briggs. In 1951, Saunders-Roe took over the interests of Cierva Autogyro and built a rotor testing building on the eastern side of the airfield, which is now derelict. They continued operations on the field until about 1960.

During the 1950s, a mainstay of business for the airport was the cross-channel car ferry service operated by Silver City Airways using Bristol Freighters and Superfreighters.

In 1959, Southampton (Eastleigh) Airport was purchased by racing pilot J.N. 'Nat' Somers, who laid the foundation for the regional airport that exists today by building the concrete runway in 1963 and negotiating with British Rail to build Southampton Airport Parkway railway station next to the airport. Somers also worked with the Department of Transport to plan for the new M27 motorway to pass through the airport just south of the runway and north of Ford's plant, at the same time installing a major roundabout outside the airport. This forward-thinking programme encouraged most of the airlines at Bournemouth (Hurn) airport to move to Southampton in the mid-1960s. In 1988 Somers' company sold the airport to Peter de Savary, who a few years later sold it to the owners of London Heathrow.

In 1993, construction of a new terminal began after an investment of £27 million by BAA. It was completed in 1994 and opened by Prince Andrew, the Duke of York.

=== 21st century ===
In 2003, the airport reached one million passengers.

In 2010, the airport arranged a series of events to commemorate the 100th anniversary of the first flight at the airport. In 2012, the Olympic flame visited the airport as part of the torch relay for the 2012 Olympics, in London. In October 2014, Heathrow Airport Holdings reached an agreement to sell the airport, together with those at Glasgow and Aberdeen, for £1 billion to AGS Airports, a consortium of Ferrovial and Macquarie Group.

In 2016 the airport won the Airport of the Year award of the European Regional Airlines Association, having demonstrated extraordinary involvement with the local community and reducing its carbon footprint, whilst growing and expanding in a highly competitive market. In March of the same year, Aer Lingus Regional announced it would fly from Southampton to Cork Airport with an ATR 72, operated by Stobart Air. In 2017, the airport reached two million passengers. In 2019 Southampton was ranked third of 30 airports in the UK for customer satisfaction by Which? magazine, with a score of 77%. On 5 June Air Force One touched down in Southampton carrying then president, Donald Trump. He then travelled to Portsmouth to mark the 75th anniversary of D-Day. The Boeing 757 was the biggest jet ever to visit Southampton.

In September 2019, the airport announced plans to extend its runway north by 164 m (538 ft) to allow it to support larger aircraft, which would enable longer routes. The airport stated its aim to increase passenger numbers from 2 million to 5 million by 2037. The airport managing director claimed that if the runway extension was not approved, the airport might have to close in 2021. Work commenced on the 164 m runway extension on 31 March 2023. It became operational on 15 August 2023 with a formal opening on 21 September. Attendees included the Aviation Minister, Baroness Vere, as well as the MP for Eastleigh, Paul Holmes.

Up to March 2020, 95% of the flights from Southampton were operated by Flybe. However, the airline went into administration on 5 March 2020 with all flights cancelled. When Flybe was purchased and relaunched, it was announced that they would start serving Southampton Airport from the 23 July 2022. The reincarnated Flybe ultimately ceased operations nine months after its relaunch.

On 9 December 2020, British Airways (BA CityFlyer) announced they would fly to 13 destinations, mainly holiday destinations, to Spain, Portugal, France, Austria, Italy and Greece. These flights filled the void left by Flybe.

On 25 May 2023, easyJet announced that they would start flying to two domestic destinations, with twice weekly flights to Glasgow and thrice weekly flights to Belfast International starting at the end of October. On 7 November 2023, easyJet yet again announced they would start flying to two summer destinations, those being Faro once a week and Alicante once a week. Not long after, easyJet announced the third summer route, a twice weekly service to Palma de Mallorca.

== Operations ==
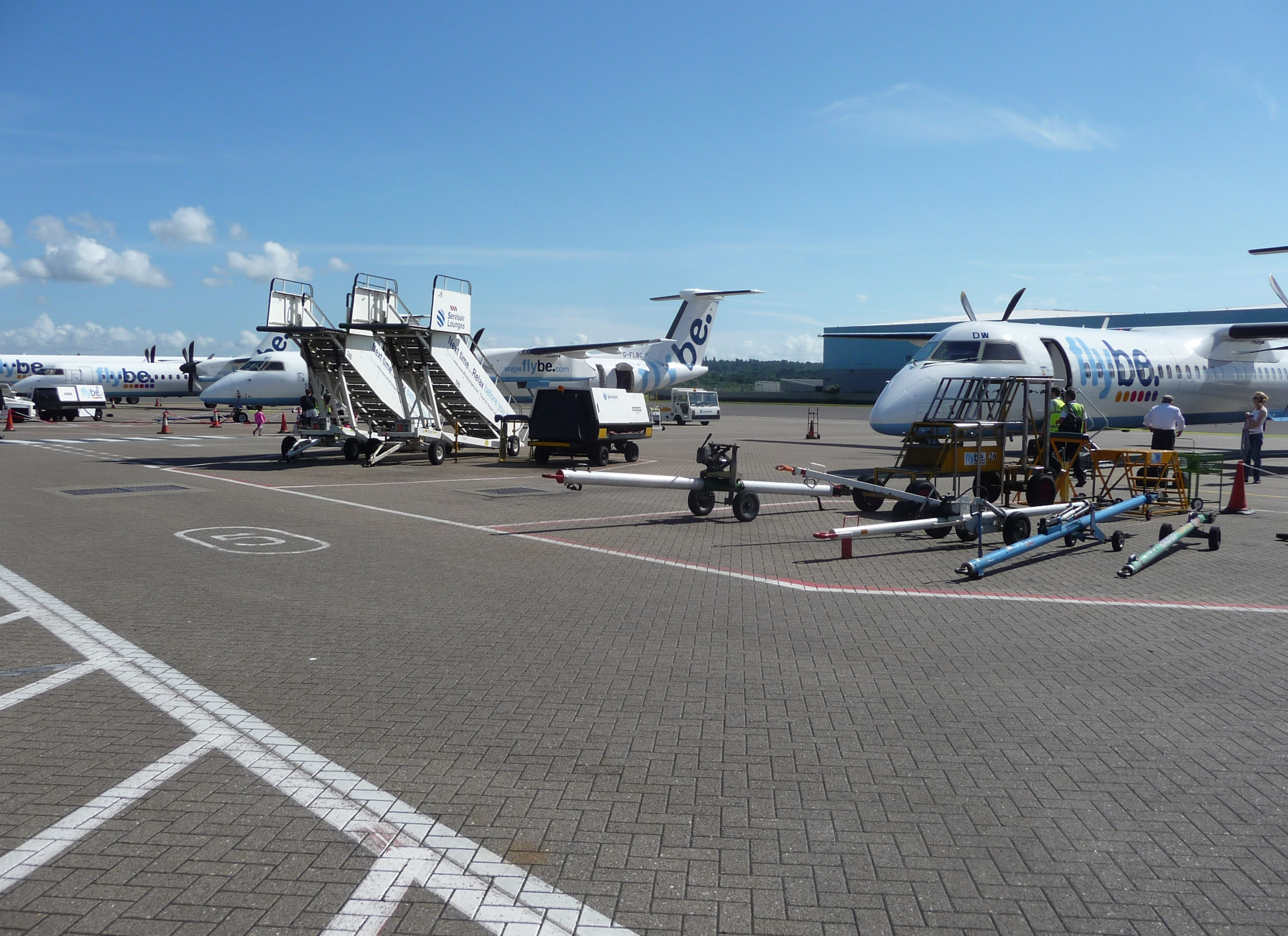
Airport apron

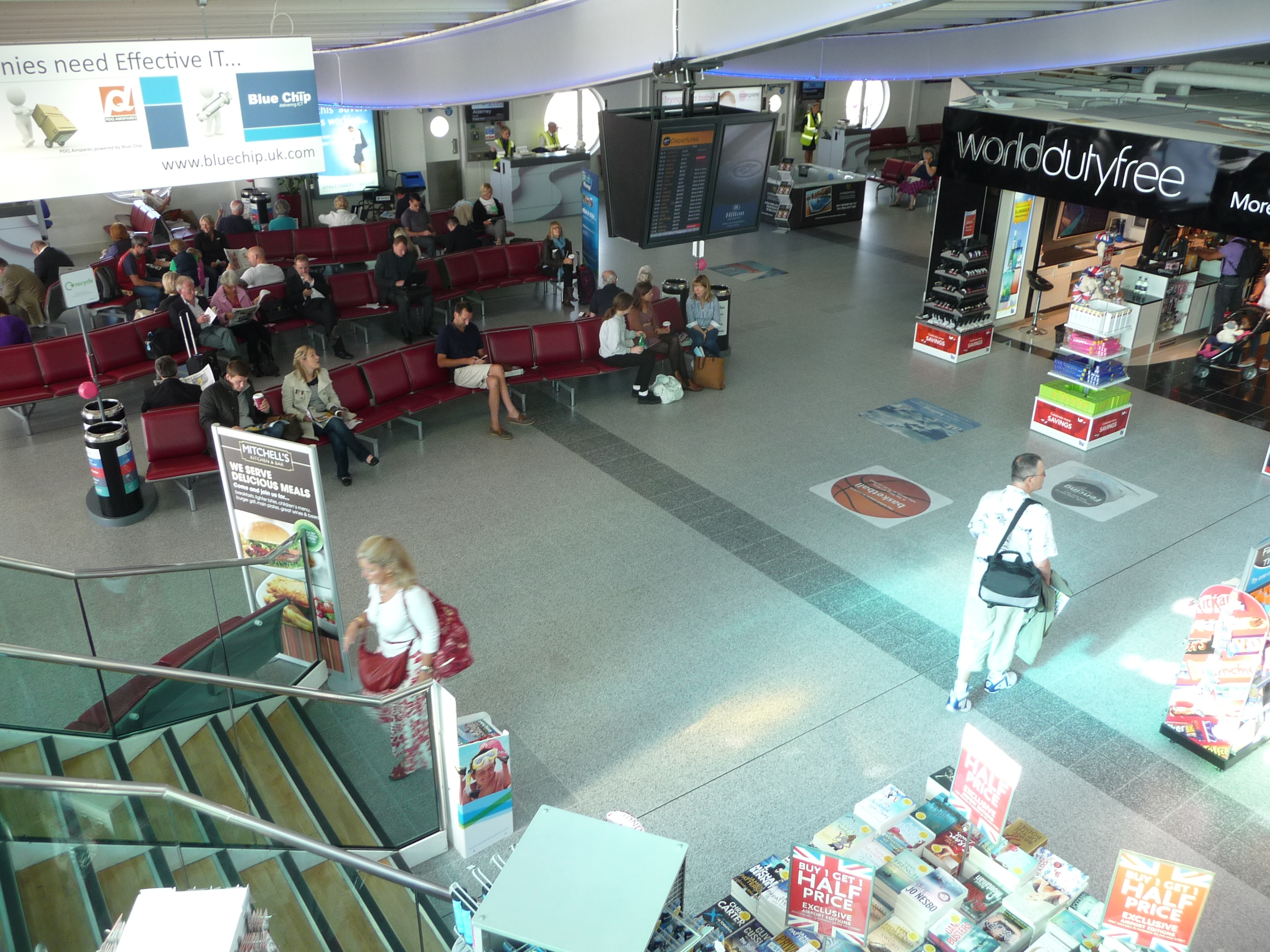
Terminal interior

=== Terminal ===
Southampton Airport has one terminal which has twelve stands. None of the stands are equipped with jet bridges. Inside the terminal, there are thirteen check-in desks. Facilities include coffee shops, bars, stationers, a duty-free shop and an upstairs lounge.

=== Airfield ===
Southampton Airport has one main ground handler, Swissport (Servisair), who took over from Aviance. They handle all passenger services and apron operations for all airlines except for Aurigny Air Services who operate their own ground handling.

Southampton has one asphalt runway, 02/20, which is 1,887 m (6,191 ft) long and 37 m (121 ft) wide. Runway 20 has an Instrument Landing System, VOR/DME and NDB navigation aids. Visual approach is allowed in both directions.

== Airlines and destinations ==
The following airlines operate regular scheduled services to and from Southampton:

| Airlines | Destinations |
|---|---|
| Aer Lingus | Belfast–City, Dublin |
| Aurigny | Alderney, Guernsey |
| easyJet | Alicante, Barcelona, Edinburgh (begins 28 March 2027), Glasgow, Malaga (begins 1 May 2027), Manchester (begins 4 December 2026), Paris–Charles de Gaulle; Seasonal: Belfast–International, Faro, Geneva, La Rochelle (begins 29 May 2027), Palma de Mallorca |
| KLM | Amsterdam |
| Loganair | Edinburgh, Jersey |
| TUI Airways | Seasonal: Palma de Mallorca |

== Statistics ==
=== Passenger numbers ===
Southampton Airport Passenger Totals 2002–2025 (thousands)
Updated: June 2021.

| Year | Passengers | Aircraft movements | Cargo (tonnes) |
|---|---|---|---|
| 2001 | 857,670 | 48,204 | 332 |
| 2002 | 789,325 | 46,767 | 382 |
| 2003 | 1,218,634 | 51,423 | 322 |
| 2004 | 1,530,776 | 54,484 | 272 |
| 2005 | 1,835,784 | 58,045 | 204 |
| 2006 | 1,912,979 | 55,786 | 195 |
| 2007 | 1,965,686 | 54,183 | 297 |
| 2008 | 1,945,993 | 50,689 | 264 |
| 2009 | 1,789,901 | 45,502 | 209 |
| 2010 | 1,733,690 | 45,350 | 116 |
| 2011 | 1,762,076 | 45,700 | 132 |
| 2012 | 1,694,120 | 43,284 | 359 |
| 2013 | 1,722,758 | 40,501 | 133 |
| 2014 | 1,831,732 | 40,374 | 133 |
| 2015 | 1,789,470 | 39,379 | 185 |
| 2016 | 1,947,052 | 42,824 | 173 |
| 2017 | 2,069,910 | 39,285 | 200 |
| 2018 | 1,991,014 | 39,651 | 233 |
| 2019 | 1,781,457 | 36,473 | 203 |
| 2020 | 296,094 | 10,931 | 69 |
| 2021 | 263,131 | 8,464 | 23 |
| 2022 | 631,458 | 16,253 | 22 |
| 2023 | 754,931 | 21,998 | 33 |
| 2024 | 852,727 | 21,369 | 81 |
Source: CAA Official Statistics

=== Busiest routes ===
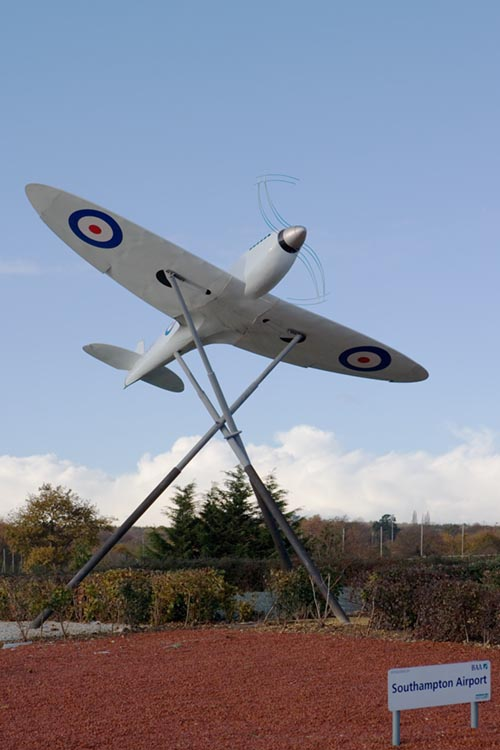
Two-thirds scale model Supermarine Spitfire prototype K5054 at Southampton Airport

Busiest routes to and from Southampton (2025)
| Rank | Airport | Total passengers | Change 2024–2025 | Carrier(s) |
|---|---|---|---|---|
| 1 | Amsterdam | 121,698 | ▲17.04% | KLM, EasyJet |
| 2 | Dublin | 101,664 | ▲15.57% | Aer Lingus |
| 3 | Glasgow | 97,226 | ▲0.53% | EasyJet |
| 4 | Belfast City (George Best) | 96,738 | ▲3.29% | Aer Lingus |
| 5 | Guernsey | 90,185 | ▼3.96% | Aurigny |
| 6 | Jersey | 83,462 | ▼6.77% | Loganair |
| 7 | Edinburgh | 82,130 | ▼0.53% | Loganair |
| 8 | Belfast International | 43,979 | ▼8.22% | EasyJet |
| 9 | Newcastle | 41,194 | ▼3.00% | Loganair |
| 10 | Alicante | 29,556 | ▲109.57% | EasyJet |

== Ground transport ==
=== Rail ===
Southampton Airport has a dedicated mainline railway station, Southampton Airport Parkway. It is on the South West Main Line from London Waterloo (66 minutes away) to Winchester (15 minutes away), Southampton (city centre about 7 minutes away), Bournemouth, Poole, Dorchester and Weymouth, with a fast and frequent service to those places. The station is a 60-second walk from the terminal, one of the closest airport links in Europe.

=== Bus ===
Unilink buses run to Southampton city centre throughout the day. Taxis are available outside Arrivals. Bluestar also runs services between Eastleigh and Hedge End aboard their 24 service hourly on the south-side of the train station.

=== Motorway ===
The airport is near the junction of the M3 and M27 motorways, giving easy road access to Southampton, Winchester, Bournemouth, Poole, Portsmouth and places between.

=== Bicycle ===
Southampton Airport has designated parking and storage for bicycles. Southampton cycle route 7 is proposed to run just outside the airport, giving it a direct cycle path to the city centre. National Cycle Route 23 also runs outside the airport, running between Southampton and Reading via Basingstoke, Alresford, Winchester and Eastleigh.

== Accidents and incidents ==
- On 10 June 1990, British Airways Flight 5390 suffered an explosive decompression over Didcot, Oxfordshire while flying from Birmingham to Málaga, Spain. The captain, Tim Lancaster, was partially ejected from the cockpit; (Note: Multiple media reports said “sucked out”, but aviation safety guidance describes rapid decompression as an outward rush of cabin air that can eject unsecured occupants.) co-pilot Alastair Atchison managed to land the plane safely at Southampton with no fatalities. Two crew members including Lancaster were seriously injured, but all passengers were unharmed. This accident appeared on the National Geographic television programme Air Crash Investigation (known as Mayday in some countries).
- On 26 May 1993, a Cessna 550 Citation II landed with a tailwind of 15 knots (28 km/h; 17 mph), while the operating manual recommended a maximum safe tailwind of 10 knots (19 km/h; 12 mph); this resulted in a landing distance requirement greater than that available at the airport. The plane overran the runway through the airport perimeter fence and onto the M27 motorway where it collided with two cars and caught fire. The two flight crew sustained minor whiplash injuries, and the three car occupants also sustained minor injuries. The aircraft was destroyed.
