= AviAlliance =

German airport operator

- Type: Private
- Industry: Airports
- Founded: 1997
- Headquarters: Düsseldorf, Germany
- Area served: Global
- Parent: Public Sector Pension Investment Board
- Website: www.avialliance.com

AviAlliance is an airport management company headquartered in Düsseldorf, Germany. The company was founded in 1997 as Hochtief AirPort, a subsidiary of Hochtief. Since 27 September 2013, the company has been owned by a subsidiary of the Public Sector Pension Investment Board.

== Airports ==
AviAlliance acquires interests in privatized airports and operates them – together with the other shareholders – as independent commercial enterprises. AviAlliance supports the operational and economic management of airport holdings.

As of 28 January 2025, AviAlliance holds shares in the following airports:

- Aberdeen Airport, 78%, acquired January 2025
- Athens International Airport, >50%
- Düsseldorf Airport, 30%
- Glasgow Airport, 78%, acquired January 2025
- Hamburg Airport, 49%
- San Juan Airport, 40%
- Southampton Airport, 78%, acquired January 2025

== Competitors ==
The company's competitors include Frankfurt based Fraport, Ferrovial, Aéroports de Paris and Vinci.
