= Heathrow Airport Holdings =

Company based in the United Kingdom

Heathrow Airport Holdings Ltd.
- Formerly: BAA plc
- Type: Private
- Traded as: LSE: BAA; FTSE 100 component (until 2006)
- Industry: Transport
- Founded: 13 December 1985; 40 years ago (as BAA plc)
- Headquarters: Compass Centre, London, England
- Key people: Thomas Woldbye (CEO); Philip Jansen (chairman)
- Products: Airport operations and services
- Services: Airport Operations
- Revenue: £3,623 million (2025)
- Operating income: £1,261 million (2025)
- Net income: £444 million (2025)
- Number of employees: 8,094 (2025)
- Parent: FGP Topco Limited, majority held by Ardian (32.61%) and QIA (20%)
- Subsidiaries: Heathrow Airport; Heathrow Express
- Website: heathrow.com/company

Heathrow Airport Holdings is a company that operates and manages Heathrow Airport based in London, England. It was formed by the privatisation of the British Airports Authority as BAA plc as part of Margaret Thatcher's privatisation of government-owned assets, and was once a constituent of the FTSE 100 Index.

BAA plc was bought in 2006 by a consortium led by Ferrovial, a Spanish firm specialising in the construction and operation of transport and urban infrastructure. In March 2009, the company was eventually required to sell Gatwick and Stansted airports; eventually BAA sold all its airports other than Heathrow and was renamed to its current name in 2012 to reflect its main business; businesses sold include the management of airports in the US and Africa, as well as the retailer World Duty Free. In 2024, Ferrovial sold most of its shares to the private capital Ardian and the Saudi Public Investment Fund, now among other foreign institutional investors.

The company's head office is in the Compass Centre, on the grounds of Heathrow Airport in the London Borough of Hillingdon. The company makes money from charging landing fees and departing passenger levies to airlines, and from ancillary operations within those airports such as retail, car parking and property.

== History ==
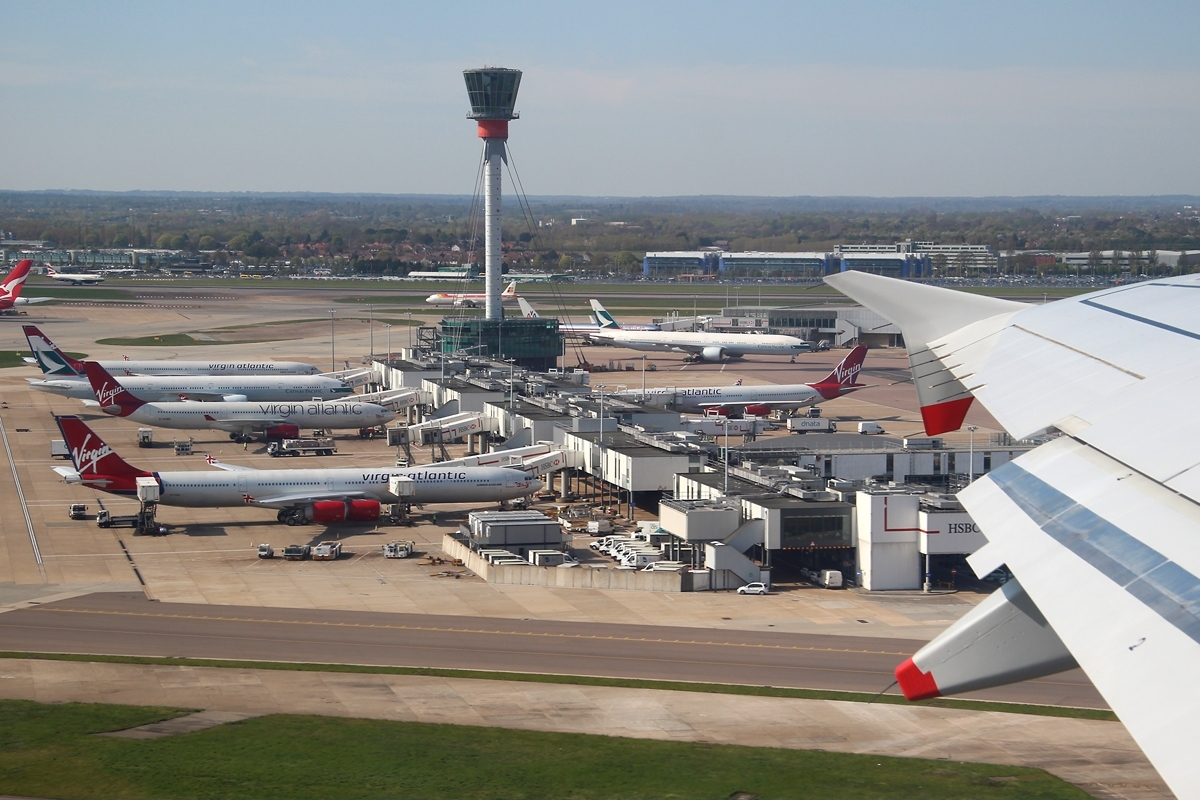
Heathrow Airport accounts for 95% of the company's business

=== British Airports Authority ===
The British Airports Authority was established by the Airport Authority Act 1965, to take responsibility for four state-owned airports from the Ministry of Aviation – Heathrow Airport, Gatwick Airport, Prestwick Airport and Stansted Airport. In the following few years, the authority acquired Edinburgh Airport (1971), Glasgow Airport (1975) and Aberdeen Airport (1975). The authority took on the Ministry of Civil Aviation Constabulary in 1966, which was renamed to become the British Airports Authority Constabulary, and was disbanded between 1974 and 1975.

As part of Margaret Thatcher's moves to privatise government owned assets, the Airports Act 1986 was passed which mandated the creation of BAA plc as a vehicle by which stock market funds could be raised. The initial capitalisation of BAA plc was £1,225 million. In the early 1990s, the company sold Prestwick International Airport (now known as Glasgow Prestwick Airport).

=== International operations and takeover ===
BAA won a contract to manage the retail operations at Pittsburgh International Airport in 1991 through its BAA USA subsidiary.

In 1995, BAA was became a cross listed company when listed on the Australian Securities Exchange in anticipation of the privatisation of the Federal Airports Corporation's airports. It was delisted in July 1998.

In December 2005, BAA made a winning bid of £1.2 billion for a 75% stake in Budapest Ferihegy International Airport, the largest airport in Hungary, which was being privatised by the Hungarian government.

In July 2006, BAA was taken over by a consortium led by Ferrovial, following a bid which valued the company at £10.1 billion ($20 billion). As a result, the company was delisted from the London Stock Exchange (where it had previously been part of the FTSE 100 Index) on 15 August 2006. Following the take-over, the decision was made to sell the stake in Ferihegy and this was completed in June 2007, when a consortium led by Hochtief AirPort of Germany purchased the stake.

BAA expanded into international operations, including retail contracts at Logan International Airport and Baltimore-Washington International Airport (through BAA USA), and a management contract with the City of Indianapolis to run the Indianapolis International Airport (as BAA Indianapolis, Inc.) before ultimately selling off its US division to Prospect Capital Corporation in July 2010.

=== Divestitures under Ferrovial ===
After an inquiry which ran from August 2008 to March 2009, the UK Competition Commission announced that BAA would be required to sell three of the seven UK airports it owned at the time within two years, over fears the monopoly position held by BAA over London and Scotland's airports could have "adverse effects for both passengers and airlines". These were Gatwick, Stansted and either Glasgow or Edinburgh airports. The sales were forecast to raise between £3.5bn and £4bn.

BAA announced plans to sell Gatwick Airport on 17 September 2009. At that time, the airport was valued at £1.8bn by regulators and it appeared that several firms including Macquarie Group, Manchester Airports Group, Fraport and Virgin Atlantic were interested in this sale, either on their own or as part of a consortium of companies. Ferrovial and its partners (Government of Singapore Investment Corporation and the Caisse de dépôt et placement du Québec) had been seeking £1.8bn to £2bn when they opened the bidding process.

Eventually, the sale was confirmed on 21 October 2009 and formally completed on 3 December 2009, for a fee of £1.51 billion, almost 25 per cent less than BAA had expected Gatwick would fetch when the sale was announced a year previously. BAA sold the airport to Global Infrastructure Partners, the fund backed by Credit Suisse and General Electric, who also operate London City Airport. Ferrovial, the majority holder in BAA, said that it expected to make a capital loss of around 142 million euros (US$212.6 million) against its consolidated earnings following the sale.

In October 2011, BAA announced that Edinburgh Airport would be put up for sale in early 2012 with an aim to handing over the running of the site to a new owner by summer 2012. Numerous groups were reported to have expressed interest, including a consortium of Scottish businesses headed by former Edinburgh Airport Manager, and Fraport, the owners of Frankfurt Airport, Germany. The airport was sold to Global Infrastructure Partners in 2012. Later that year, the company name was changed to Heathrow Airport Holdings Limited.

In January 2013, it was announced that Stansted would be sold to the Manchester Airports Group, a holding company owned by the 10 borough councils of Greater Manchester.

In May 2014, Heathrow Airport Holdings announced the appointment of John Holland-Kaye, current Development Director, as chief executive officer, succeeding Colin Matthews on 1 July 2014. The company agreed on 16 October 2014 to sell Glasgow, Southampton and Aberdeen airports to AGS Airports, a consortium of Ferrovial and Macquarie Group for £1 billion, in order to focus solely on Heathrow.

=== COVID-19 pandemic and new consortium ===
As of 2020, during the COVID-19 pandemic which enormously reduced air travel, the company had debts of over £17 billion to banks and bondholders. It is amongst the highest indebted UK companies, though 90% of its shares are held overseas. Its request in October 2020 to increase airport charges was rejected by the Civil Aviation Authority.

In January 2024, Ferrovial announced it would sell its shareholding to Ardian and the Public Investment Fund, subject to approval by regulatory bodies and rights which may be exercised by other shareholders. On 15 December 2024, it was reported that Ardian and the Public Investment Fund of Saudi Arabia have successfully acquired 22.6% and 15% respectively of stakes in Heathrow Airport for a combined US$4.12 billion through Ferrovial and other shareholders in FGP TopCo.

== Senior leadership ==
=== Chairman ===
- Nigel Foulkes (1972–1977)

=== List of chief executives ===
1. Jeremy Marshall (1987–1989)
2. Sir John Egan (1990–1999)
3. Michael Hodgkinson (1999–2003)
4. Mike Clasper (2003–2006)
5. Stephen Nelson (2006–2008)
6. Colin Matthews (2008–2014)
7. John Holland-Kaye (2014–2023)
8. Thomas Woldbye (2023 - Current)

== Corporate affairs ==
The BAA logo, introduced in 1986

As BAA, the company stated that its name did not stand for anything. It was still widely referred to as the "British Airports Authority" by both the media and the public, though the Authority was dissolved following the 1986 privatisation. BAA should not be confused with BA, the abbreviation of British Airways.

The company's former logo, composed of three green triangles, was created by John Lloyd and Jim Northover of the design consultancy Lloyd Northover, at the time of the privatisation in 1986.

The original BAA plc was acquired in 2006 by Airport Development and Investment Limited (ADI), a new company formed by the Ferrovial consortium. In October 2008, ADI changed its name to BAA Limited, and on 15 October 2012, the company announced that it had changed its name to Heathrow Airport Holdings. Colin Matthews, Chief Executive of the company, said that, given the reduction in the number of airports owned by the company, the BAA name was no longer appropriate; after the sale of Stansted, Heathrow Airport would account for 95% of the company's business. Each remaining airport owned by the company reverted to operating under its own name rather than the BAA banner.

As a major client of the UK construction industry, it is a member of the Construction Clients' Group, which represents client views to the government's Strategic Forum for Construction.

Ownership (as FGP Topco Limited)
Owner	Shares
Ardian	32.61%
Qatar Investment Authority	20%
Public Investment Fund	15.01%
GIC	11.2%
Australian Retirement Trust	11.18%
China Investment Corporation	10%

=== Head office ===
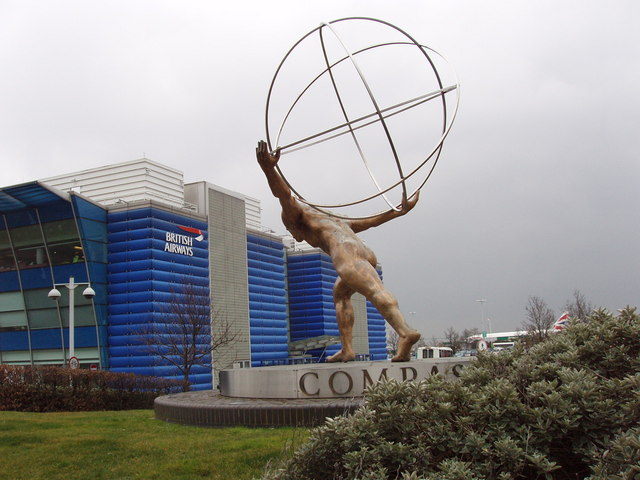
Compass Centre, when it was a British Airways facility

The company's head office is located in the Compass Centre on the grounds of Heathrow Airport in Hounslow. The Compass Centre previously served as a British Airways flight crew centre. When Heathrow Terminal 5 opened on 27 March 2008, British Airways staff, including crew check-in staff, relocated from the Compass Centre to Terminal 5.

The original BAA plc's head office was located near London Victoria station in the City of Westminster, London.

=== Flying matters ===
BAA was a founding member of Flying Matters, a coalition of business groups, trade unions, tourism groups and the aviation industry (airports, airlines, aerospace manufacturers and air traffic control) launched in June 2007 to "balance the argument around issues of aviation and climate change" arguing that aviation does not contribute significantly to climate change, and that an expansion of aviation will aid the developing world, benefit social justice, and is essential for UK tourism and for the UK economy. The group was dissolved in April 2011 after several members, including BAA, left the coalition.

=== Expansion of Heathrow Airport ===
Since 2009, the company has been progressing a plan to build a third runway to expand Heathrow Airport. This requires government approval, and on 5 June 2018 the Cabinet approved the third runway, with a full vote planned for Parliament. The financing of the expansion has yet to be arranged, with Heathrow Airport Holdings' finances already highly leveraged. In 2017 borrowings were £13.4 billion, with shareholders' equity at £0.7 billion.

== Current operations ==
=== Owned and operated ===
Heathrow Airport Holdings UK airport
- Heathrow Airport

=== Rail ===
- Heathrow Express (operated by Great Western Railway)

== Previous operations ==
=== Previously owned and operated airports ===
- Aberdeen Airport (sold in December 2014 to AGS Airports)
- Edinburgh Airport (sold in April 2012 to Global Infrastructure Partners)
- Gatwick Airport (sold in December 2009 to Global Infrastructure Partners)
- Glasgow Airport (sold in December 2014 to AGS Airports)
- Glasgow Prestwick Airport (sold in 1992)
- Naples International Airport 65% stake (sold in 2010)
- Southampton Airport (sold in December 2014 to AGS Airports)
- Stansted Airport (sold in February 2013 to Manchester Airports Group)

=== Previously managed airports ===
- Baltimore-Washington International Airport (retail only)
- Boston Logan International Airport (retail only)
- Indianapolis International Airport
- Pittsburgh International Airport (retail only)
- Sir Seewoosagur Ramgoolam International Airport

=== Rail ===
- Heathrow Connect (joint operation with First Great Western, superseded by TfL Rail in May 2018)

=== Retail ===
- World Duty Free (previously ran all of BAA's retail operations. Sold in 2008 to Autogrill)

== Controversies ==
=== Heathrow management ===
The company has received criticism for prioritising shops over extra security aisles at Heathrow. After much criticism for this, BAA removed some shops to provide extra security lanes. The Economist wrote that retail is important for BAA at Heathrow because, by law, landing charges are much less than those of similar-scope airports and shops help make up the difference.

BAA has been accused of under-investing in snow and ice-fighting technology at Heathrow, which led to runway closures and severe delays in December 2010.

In July 2019, Unite threatened a strike over pay after growing frustration on pay inequality. Whilst the CEO John Holland-Kaye was awarded a 103% pay rise from £2,100,000 to £4,200,000, staff have been denied a 4.5% increase.

=== Heathrow protest injunction ===
In July 2007, BAA sought an injunction preventing potential protesters involved in the Camp for Climate Action from approaching Heathrow Airport. The injunction specifically targeted anyone belonging to, or protesting in the name of, AirportWatch, The No Third Runway Action Group and Plane Stupid. Airport Watch members included Friends of the Earth, Greenpeace, the Campaign to Protect Rural England, the World Development Movement, the National Trust and the Royal Society for the Protection of Birds – all of whom were caught by what was described as the 'Mother of all Injunctions'.

BAA denied seeking a blanket ban on airport protest. In the end they won a more limited injunction, and the camp went ahead amid considerable worldwide publicity. Afterwards, Duncan Bonfield, BAA director of corporate affairs, and Mark Mann, BAA head of media relations, resigned.

=== General aviation ===
BAA's pricing structure mostly excludes general aviation access to their airports by either banning the movements of light aircraft, or setting high fees and mandatory handling charges. The total charges for landing, one night of parking, and mandatory handling for a Cessna 152 (including VAT) in 2013 was £234 at Aberdeen, £193 at Glasgow, and £187 at Southampton. Heathrow Airport does not permit any flights for recreational, commemorative, charity and record breaking purposes, light twin-engine private aircraft and all light single-engine aircraft.

BAA has since taken steps to improve this issue, including the waiving of mandatory handling fees for light aircraft at Aberdeen and Southampton. In 2014, the equivalent charges were £29.65 at Southampton and £64.63 at Aberdeen. However, the fees remained the same at Glasgow. It was also acknowledged that Heathrow Airport's runways are used at 99% of their capacity, and therefore the charges were set on the basis of very high demand and the lack of supply.

== See also ==
- List of companies based in London
