= Clyde Metro =

Proposed mass-transit system in Scotland

Clyde Metro is a proposed multimodal mass-transit system in Scotland for the city of Glasgow and the surrounding area. It is named after the River Clyde, which flows through the city.

== History ==
In 2022, a Scottish Government review of public transport in Scotland, the second Strategic Transport Projects Review (STPR2), made a series of recommendations to public transport provisions, of which one was Clyde Metro.

Incorporating existing modes and routes, including the Glasgow Subway and existing rail lines, the proposals outline the possibility of new light surface-running metro lines and heavy rail converted into heavy metro, with expansions of the latter.

The Scottish Government notes that the recommendations in STPR2 are 'not fully funded and is subject to the funding allocations agreed by Parliament each year through the annual budget process'.

=== Case for Investment ===
In November 2023, it was announced that SPT would be taking the lead and working with Glasgow City Council, Glasgow City Region and Transport Scotland to establish the business case and the initial delivery phases; this phase is estimated to take two years, starting from 2024.

In December 2024, the Scottish Government wrote, 'We will keep providing technical assurance to SPT, as they lead the Case for Investment for Clyde Metro. This key stage of the development process, which will inform decisions about network selection, phasing and implementation, is expected to be complete by early 2027'.
