= Environmental effects of aviation in the United Kingdom =

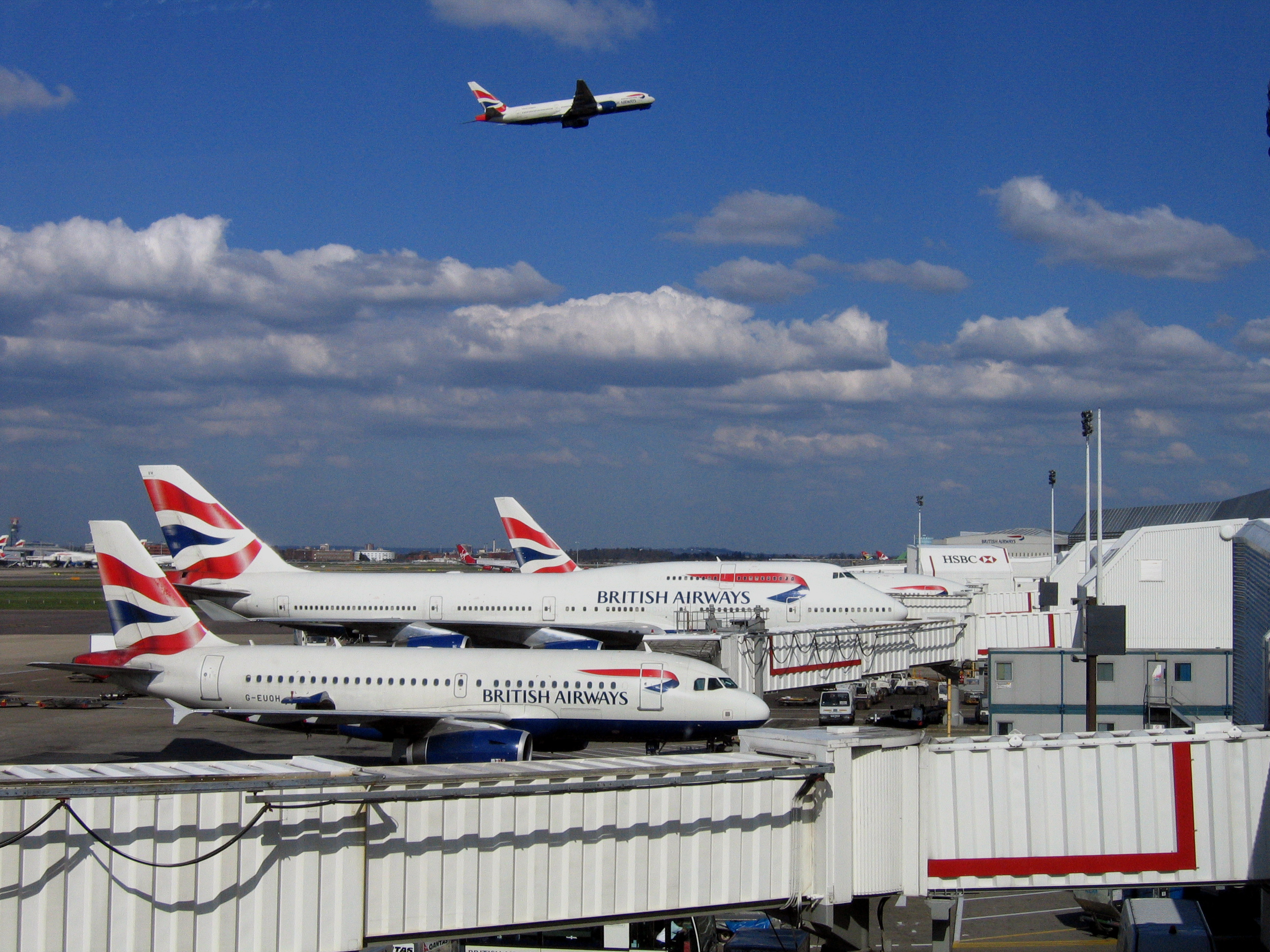
London Heathrow Airport

The environmental effects of aviation in the United Kingdom are increasing due to the increasing demand for air travel in the country. In the past 25 years the UK air transport industry has seen sustained growth, and the demand for passenger air travel in particular is forecast to increase more than twofold, to 465 million passengers, by 2030. Two airports; London Heathrow and London Gatwick, are amongst the top ten busiest airports in the world for international passenger traffic. Whilst more than half of all passengers travelling by air in the UK currently travel via the five London area airports, regional airports have experienced the most growth in recent years, due to the success of 'no-frills' airlines over the last decade.

The ability of the existing airport infrastructure to meet forecast demand is limited, and government policy published in 2003 supports the development of additional airport capacity by 2030 to address this. The strategy is generally based on making the best use of existing facilities, although an additional five new runways nationwide are considered to be necessary, three of them at the London airports of Stansted, Heathrow and, towards the end of the timeframe involved, Gatwick. This policy is designed to be a balanced and measured approach to the future of the air transport industry; one that recognises both an economic advantage in providing for growth in demand for air travel and also the need to address the consequent environmental effects. The strategy has been criticised by the House of Commons Environmental Audit Select Committee, by environmentalist and campaign groups, and in research papers, for implementing a predict and provide model that overstates the economic advantages whilst paying insufficient heed to the environmental consequences.

Support for airport expansion is based on an economic case that regards the air transport industry not only as an important industry in its own right, but also as a facilitator of growth for the economy as a whole. One study predicts that the government's strategy will realise an additional £13 billion per annum in Gross Domestic Product (GDP) by 2030. Another study which is critical of the government approach, and which favours addressing environmental effects through increased taxation of air transport, indicates a negative economic benefit resulting from airport expansion. In 2006 the industry was responsible for over 6 per cent of all UK carbon emissions, a figure that is set to rise as demand increases. Under current strategies of emissions reduction and growth in air transport, air travel in the UK could account for up to 50 per cent of the UK carbon budget by 2050. Industry attempts to address this issue are longer term efforts based on technological and operational improvements, whilst government policy is based on the inclusion of air transport within emissions trading schemes. Critics advocate a shift in government policy to address environmental effects by constraining the growth in demand for air travel, primarily through the use of economic instruments to price air travel less attractively. Local environmental issues include noise and air quality, and the effects of these, particularly in the case of the former, is subject to debate. Government policy generally is that these are local issues best addressed locally, and has introduced legislation designed to facilitate this.

== Air transport framework ==
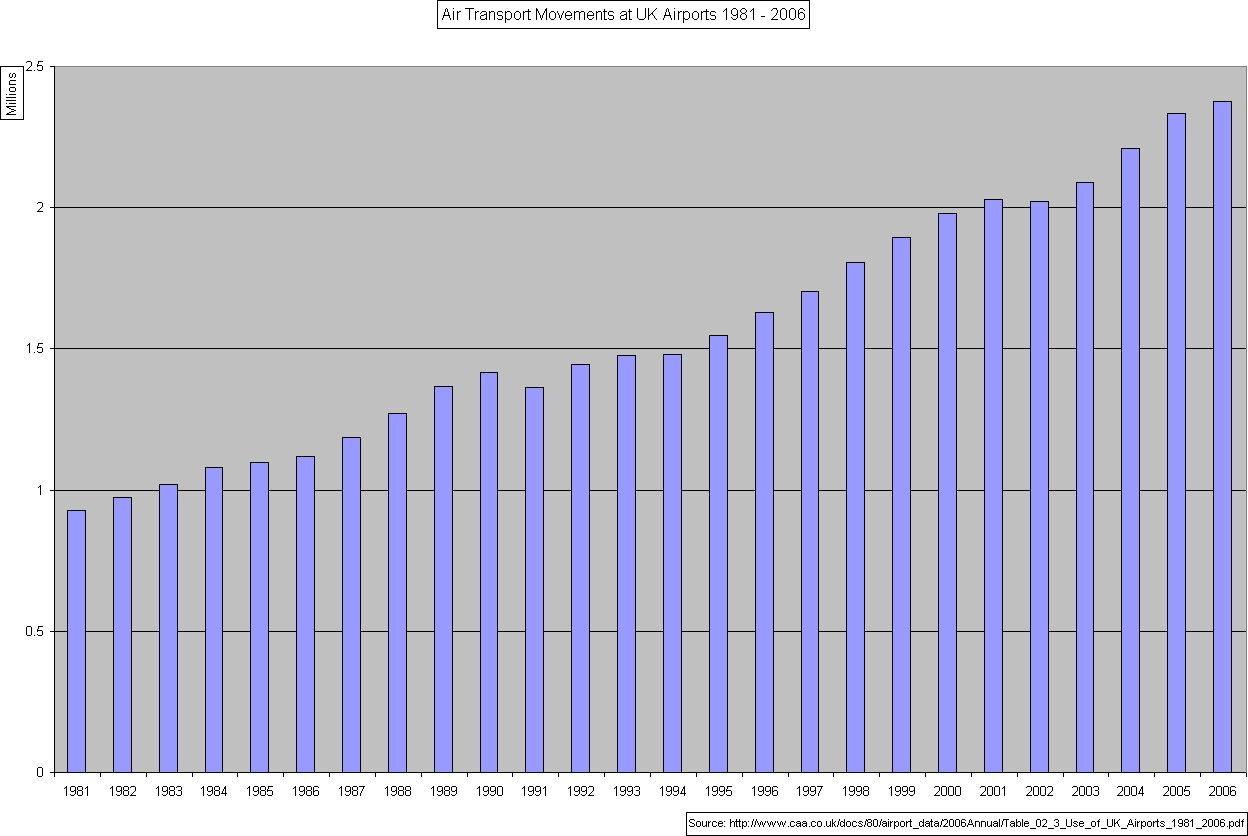
Growth in air transport movements 1981–2006

Air transport in the United Kingdom is a growth industry. In the period 1981 to 2006 the number of terminal passengers increased by 400 per cent and air transport movements by 250 per cent. Although the transport of freight declined slightly year on year between 2004 and 2006, in the decade since 1996 air freight has increased by 31 per cent. During the period in which government policy was being formulated the number of passengers exceeded 200 million, and in 2006 the industry handled over 236 million passengers (up 3 per cent from the previous year), with nearly 2.4 million air transport movements (up 1.8 per cent).

=== Infrastructure ===
Air traffic services for all UK airspace is provided by National Air Traffic Services (NATS), which also provides air traffic control at 15 airports. The largest airport operator is Heathrow Airport Holdings, owner of six UK airports including Heathrow airport. In some cases airport ownership is in the hands of local government authorities rather than private businesses, and the largest UK owned operator, Manchester Airports Group, operator of Manchester Airport, Bournemouth Airport, East Midlands Airport, and Humberside Airport, is owned by a consortium of 10 Manchester area local authorities. Whilst the number of airports in the UK runs into hundreds, many are smaller aerodromes dealing with general aviation rather than air transport. In terms of the latter, statistics are collected from 59 main airports, and the largest concentration of services is located in the London and South East of England areas.

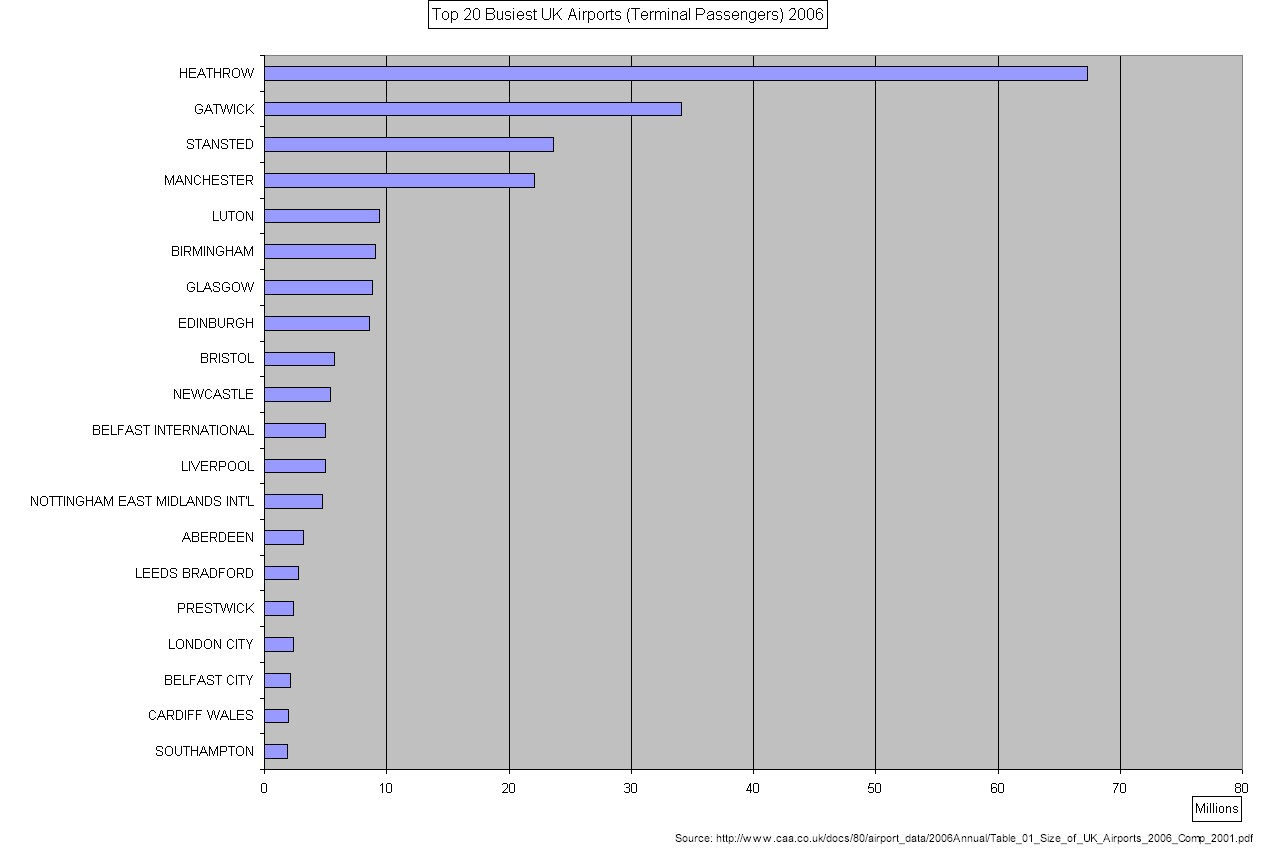
Largest UK airports 2006

Heathrow is the largest airport in the country, handling over 67 million terminal passengers in 2006, making it the third busiest airport in the world, and the busiest if measured by the number of international passengers. Nearly a third of all overseas residents visiting the UK enter the country via this airport, which also handles more than a fifth of all overseas visits by UK residents. Even though there are no dedicated freight services operating out of Heathrow, the practise of transporting cargo in the holds of passenger aircraft means that this airport still accounts for more than half of all freight handled by UK airports. Gatwick airport, with 34 million terminal passengers, is the second largest in the country, eighth busiest in the world for international passenger traffic, and lays claim to the busiest single runway airport in the world. Between them the five London airports handle nearly 137 million terminal passengers, 59 per cent of the national total. Stansted and East Midlands airports have both experienced large growth in freight handling over the past decade, and these two airports are the major hubs for express freight operations.

Outside of London and the South East, the use of regional airports has increased dramatically in recent years, with the amount of air traffic using these facilities doubling in the period 1995 to 2005. To illustrate this growth, in the five years from 2001 passenger numbers at the regional airports of Exeter Airport, Bristol Airport, and Newcastle Airport increased by 191 per cent, 113 per cent, and 60 per cent respectively. In the same period the largest airports experienced some of the slowest growth, with Heathrow passenger numbers increasing by 11 per cent, and those of Gatwick increasing by less than 10 per cent.

=== Airlines ===
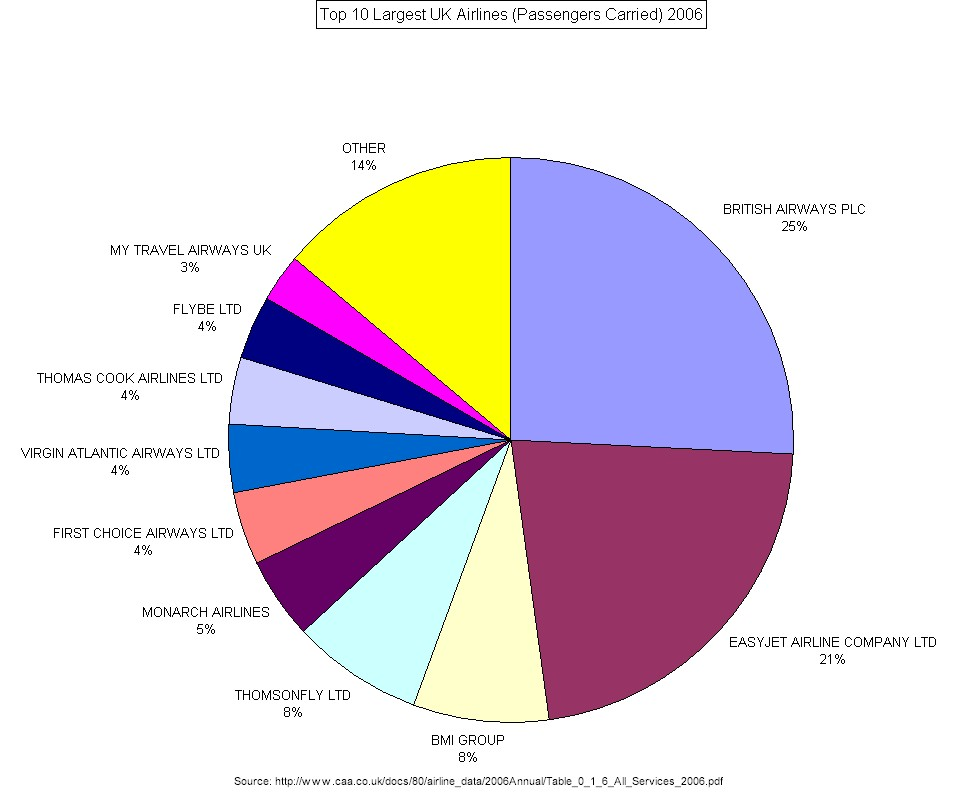
Largest UK airlines 2006

The majority of all passengers travelling by air to or from the UK are carried by UK airlines, of which there are around twenty-five, and at the end of 2006 the UK air transport fleet numbered 963 aircraft, flying just under 1.2 million flights and averaging over eight hours of flying daily. Together the two largest airlines as measured by passenger numbers; British Airways and easyJet, account for nearly half of the 127 million passengers flown on UK airlines. In terms of capacity, both available and used, British Airways is again the largest airline, whilst easyJet is pushed into third place by Virgin Atlantic. British Airways passenger flights also account for over 50 per cent of all cargo carried by UK airlines, and when combined with its cargo operations the airline carries over 60 per cent of all cargo carried by UK airlines.

The advent in the mid-1990s of 'no-frills' carriers, such as easyJet, has had a significant influence on air travel in the UK. In 2005 these airlines carried 77.5 million passengers, up from just 4.3 million in 1996. They are responsible for the growth of regional airports, operating from 35 airports in 2006 compared to 10 in 1996, and increasing the choice of international destinations, serving 150 in 2006, compared to 12 a decade earlier. The annual rate of growth in the overall demand for air travel has remained stable since 1975, averaging 5.8 per cent annually. Recent growth is being serviced by the no-frills airlines at the expense of traditional carriers which, since 2000, have experienced flat or declining traffic levels. In response, traditional carriers have lowered costs to compete more effectively on price, leading to lower prices on the short haul routes serviced by this sector, especially in business fares. They have also limited or reduced capacity and in some cases launched no-frills subsidiaries of their own.

=== Passenger travel ===
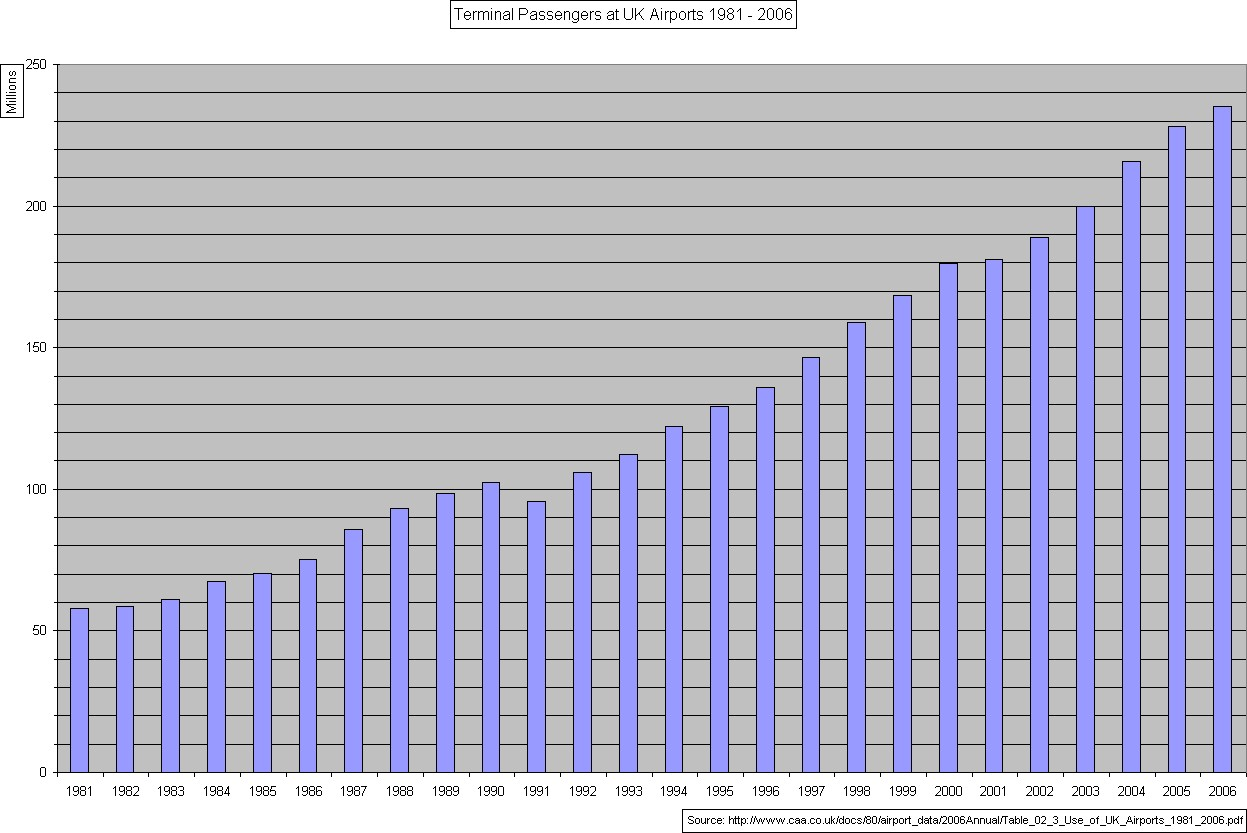
Passenger numbers 1981–2006

Just over a fifth of all terminal passengers are travelling on domestic routes only, whilst half are travelling between the UK and the rest of the European Union (EU). Of the latter, travel between the UK and Spain, France, Germany and Italy account for around half, with Spain almost matching the other three combined in terms of passenger numbers. Outside of the EU, the United States, the Far East, Switzerland and the Middle East together account for just over half of all passengers flying between the UK and the rest of the world, with the USA exceeding the other three combined in terms of passenger numbers. Air travel is the most popular mode of transport for visitors both to and from the UK. In 2005 it was used for 80 per cent of all visits by UK residents travelling overseas and by 74 per cent of all inbound visits. Just over a quarter of all passengers are travelling on business. The advent of no-frills carriers has had a significant effect on passenger travel profiles, with strong growth in business travel from regional airports, and increasing inbound traffic generated for the purposes of non-UK residents visiting friends and relatives based in the UK. Whilst these carriers have been perceived to democratise air travel, providing the opportunity for lower income groups to travel more often, the main result is actually that middle and higher income groups travel more often, and often for shorter trips. Researchers have been raising concern about the globally increasing hypermobility of individuals, involving frequent and often long distance air travel and the resulting environmental and climate effects.

== Airport development strategy ==
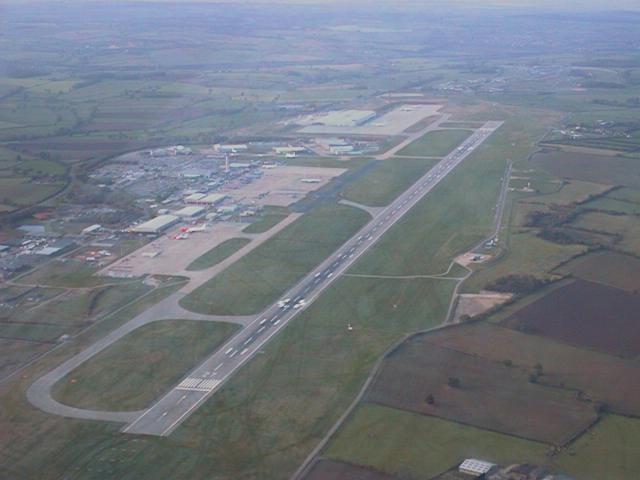
East Midlands airport – Major hub for express freight operations

Whilst airport development in the UK is subject to local planning authority processes, the government regards airports as an important part of the national infrastructure and which therefore requires their development to be planned with a strategic approach. To support this, the government began a three-year public consultation process with the publication in December 2000 of The Future of Aviation consultation document. This outlined the issues underpinning air transport and sought views on how they should be addressed in any future policy. One of the main questions asked was whether policy should focus on meeting demand or whether it should focus instead on limiting the negative effects of air transport. Another key issue for which views were sought was how the industry might best meet the environmental costs it incurs. Between July 2002 and February 2003 a further seven regional consultation documents were published. These focussed on the economic, environmental, social and airspace appraisals relating to options for future airport development specific to the regions, and together they generated half a million responses. During the spring of 2003, workshops based on a consultation document titled Aviation and the Environment – Using Economic Instruments were held to seek stakeholder views on the desirability and effectiveness of various financial measures that might address the environmental effects of aviation. The consultation process ended in December 2003 with the publication of The Future of Air Transport White Paper which detailed the government's conclusions.

The White Paper does not in itself authorise or preclude any development, but seeks instead to define a "national strategic framework for the future development of airport capacity" over the next 30 years. The principal conclusion is that the two extremes of failing to provide additional airport capacity, and encouraging growth without regard for the wider consequences, are equally unacceptable options. Instead a "balanced and measured approach" to the future of air transport in the UK is adopted. This approach is designed to cater for the forecast growth in demand, thus supporting economic prosperity nationally and enabling ordinary people to travel at reasonable cost, whilst at the same time managing and mitigating the environmental effects of aviation and ensuring that the costs associated with them are reflected in the price of air travel. The strategy seeks to minimise new airport development by making best use of existing facilities, and specific policies include:

Region	Policy
Scotland	Expansion of Edinburgh Airport with an additional runway, to accommodate up to 20mppa by 2020, and the recommendation that measures be taken to safeguard a possible additional runway at Glasgow Airport.
Wales	Cardiff Airport to remain the main airport serving South Wales, to be supported by additional terminal capacity and improved surface links, subject to satisfactory resolution of any local environmental concerns.
Northern Ireland	Support for the development of capacity within the existing boundaries of Belfast Airport and early consideration of the future development of the City of Derry Airport, with all developments needing careful environmental assessment.
North of England	Expansion of Manchester Airport to increase terminal capacity to support up to 50mppa, accompanied by "stringent measures" to minimise noise disruption and ensure air quality standards. The possibility of extending the runway at Liverpool Airport. Development of surface access at a number of airports in the region.
Midlands	Expansion of Birmingham Airport with an additional runway, accompanied by "stringent measures" to minimise noise disruption and ensure air quality standards, and improvements to surface access. The option to expand East Midlands Airport with an additional runway is to be kept under review.
South West of England	Development of Bristol Airport with a runway extension and additional terminal, to support up to 12mppa, having due regard to the environmental effects of such developments, and support for the development of Bournemouth Airport, conditional on surface access improvements and minimal or compensated effects on sensitive ecological sites. Support for development of Newquay and Exeter Airports.
South East of England	Expansion of Stansted Airport with an additional runway, with "strict environmental controls", as soon as possible and in the expectation of achieving this around 2011/2012. Development of Heathrow Airport, conditional on meeting "stringent environmental limits", to include an additional runway in the 2015–2020 timeframe, and "... an urgent programme of work and consultation to find solutions to the key environmental issues at Heathrow ...". Expansion of Gatwick Airport with an additional runway after the planning agreement preventing this expires in 2019.

=== Subsequent developments ===
In December 2006 the government published the Air Transport White Paper Progress Report 2006 to report on progress made in "... delivering a sustainable future for aviation." The report re-iterates the government's commitment to the strategy defined in the original White Paper, stating that it "... strikes the right balance between economic, social and environmental goals." It also reports that; the extra runway at Edinburgh airport is now thought unlikely to be needed before 2020; Bristol airport does not currently see a case to support extending its runway, although the option will be kept under review; the additional runway at Stansted airport is not expected to be operational before 2015; and the runway extension at Liverpool airport is now being proposed for early next decade. Elsewhere, recent forecasts conducted for Birmingham airport indicate that a new runway will not be required there before 2030.

Following the publication of the White Paper, the Project for the Sustainable Development of Heathrow ('Project Heathrow' for short) was set up to examine how expansion at Heathrow could best be accomplished within the constraints of the stringent environmental limits the White Paper required. A provisional assessment indicates that increased usage of the existing runways could be realised without increasing the number of people affected by noise if 'mixed mode' operations (the simultaneous use of both runways for arrivals and departures) are phased in gradually as noisier aircraft are retired. Indications ahead of the Project Heathrow environmental assessment indicate that increased noise and deterioration in air quality are likely to significantly constrain traffic using a new third runway. These issues are to be addressed as part of a three-month consultation beginning in December 2007, and considerable opposition is being mobilised against the expansion of Heathrow.

== Economic contribution ==
The aviation industry and the government have together commissioned two significant studies into the economic contribution of air transport, both undertaken by the consultancy Oxford Economic Forecasting (OEF). The first; The Contribution of the Aviation Industry to the UK Economy, was published in 1999 and was used as a source of economic information in The Future of Air Transport White Paper. The second study; The Economic Contribution of the Aviation Industry in the UK, co-sponsored by the national tourist agency VisitBritain, was published in October 2006 to extend and update the earlier report, and was used as a source in the Air Transport White Paper Progress Report 2006. Both studies concluded that whilst aviation is an important industry in its own right, the most important contribution is as "... a facilitator of growth for the economy as a whole."

Environmental groups dispute the economic benefits that are claimed for air transport, and the OEF reports have been specifically challenged. The Aviation Environment Federation (AEF), publishing the Rebuttal of Oxford Economic Forecasting Report, has labelled the 2006 OEF report "biased and misleading". AirportWatch, an umbrella movement for national environmental organisations and airport community groups opposed to aviation expansion, has produced a critique of the 2006 OEF report and the DfT's reliance on economic research that has been "... sponsored by the aviation industry." In response to government policy supporting further growth in aviation, Friends of the Earth (FoE) published Pie in the Sky in September 2006. This study concludes that the economic benefits of aviation have been exaggerated, and that the costs arising from environmental damage, as well as to other sectors of the economy, are ignored. Also published in 2006, the Environmental Change Institute study Predict and decide – Aviation, climate change and UK policy re-examined the economic arguments made in favour of aviation, concluding that restricting future growth would not necessarily be detrimental to the economy, and could potentially result in some economic benefits.

=== Direct economic contribution ===
In terms of direct contribution to the UK economy, air transport is an £11.4 billion industry, a figure which represents 1.1 per cent of the country's economy. It employs 186,000 people (full-time equivalents), and indirectly supports an additional 334,000 jobs, although the inclusion of indirect employment as an economic benefit of air transport is disputed. In terms of productivity the aviation industry in 2004 was the third most productive, after the oil/gas extraction and utilities sectors, exceeding the national average by a factor of two and a half. The industry is also very capital intensive, accounting for up to 3.5 per cent of total UK business investment in the period 2000 to 2004. Air transport was directly responsible for £3.6 billion in tax and national insurance contributions in 2004/5, which includes £0.9 billion raised in Air Passenger Duty (APD), a figure set to double after APD rates were doubled in February 2007. Because of the global nature of the industry, article 15 of the Chicago Convention effectively prevents the imposition of fuel duty on aviation, and the industry does not pay Value Added Tax (VAT). Environmental groups argue that these, along with duty-free sales, are iniquitous tax concessions valued at £9 billion annually. Despite generating £6.9 billion in exports in 2004, representing 3 per cent of all UK exports and 7 per cent of the total export of services, the patronage in the UK of air transport services provided by overseas airlines resulted in a £3.3 billion balance of payments deficit attributable to the industry.

=== Indirect economic contribution ===
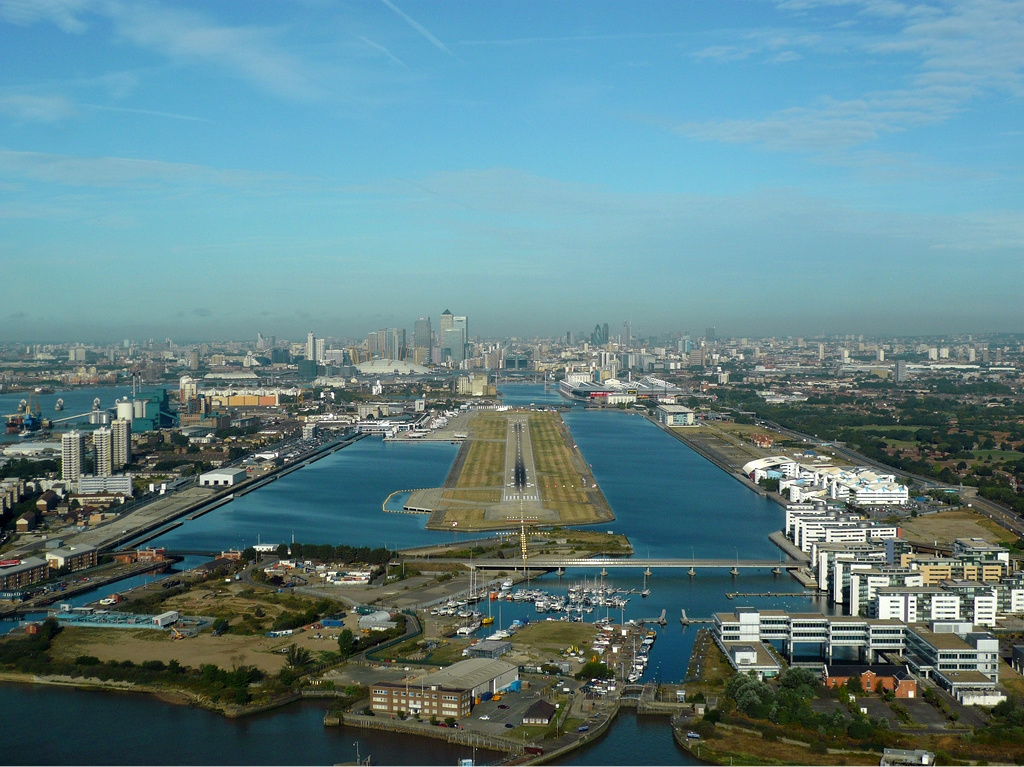
London City Airport

The government's response to the challenges of an increasingly global economy is to build a "strong, modern knowledge economy", and the 2006 OEF study concludes that the UK economy is "...set to become increasingly dependent on aviation as the structure of the economy evolves." The availability of air transport services is regarded as an important factor in facilitating business activities, with benefits being realised in sales and marketing activities, customer and supplier relationships, the ability to serve a wider market, access to emerging markets, and more efficient production. Within industry sectors that are likely to support the development of a knowledge based economy, such as pharmaceuticals, banking and finance, communication services, computer services etc., there is conflicting evidence about a correlation between growth in a sector and that sector's use of air travel, although survey results show that knowledge based services and high-tech manufacturing businesses are more dependent on air transport for sales than their more traditional economy counterparts.

The most successful example of the country's economic evolution is the international financial services industry based in London. Within this sector aviation services are seen as critically important for both businesses and their clients, even in the era of video-conferencing. London's air transport services are widely regarded within the London business community surveyed by the OEF to provide a competitive advantage over the rest of Europe, and expansion of airport capacity in the South East has significant support. Whilst these economic contributions are not disputed by environmental groups, they are not considered as sufficient justification to support further growth in air transport services which would primarily service increased demand for leisure travel rather than a business travel market which is already well served.

Transport links generally are regarded as an important factor which affects a company's decision on where to locate, and thus invest, although the latest survey shows quality of telecommunications moving above transport in importance. Survey evidence indicates that a quarter of companies regard access to air services as an important factor in the decision of where in the UK to locate operations, whilst one in ten companies report that the absence of good air transport links has affected their decision to invest in the UK. The survey has been criticised as suffering from a poor response rate and therefore open to bias, though this issue has been recognised and rationalised by the report's authors.

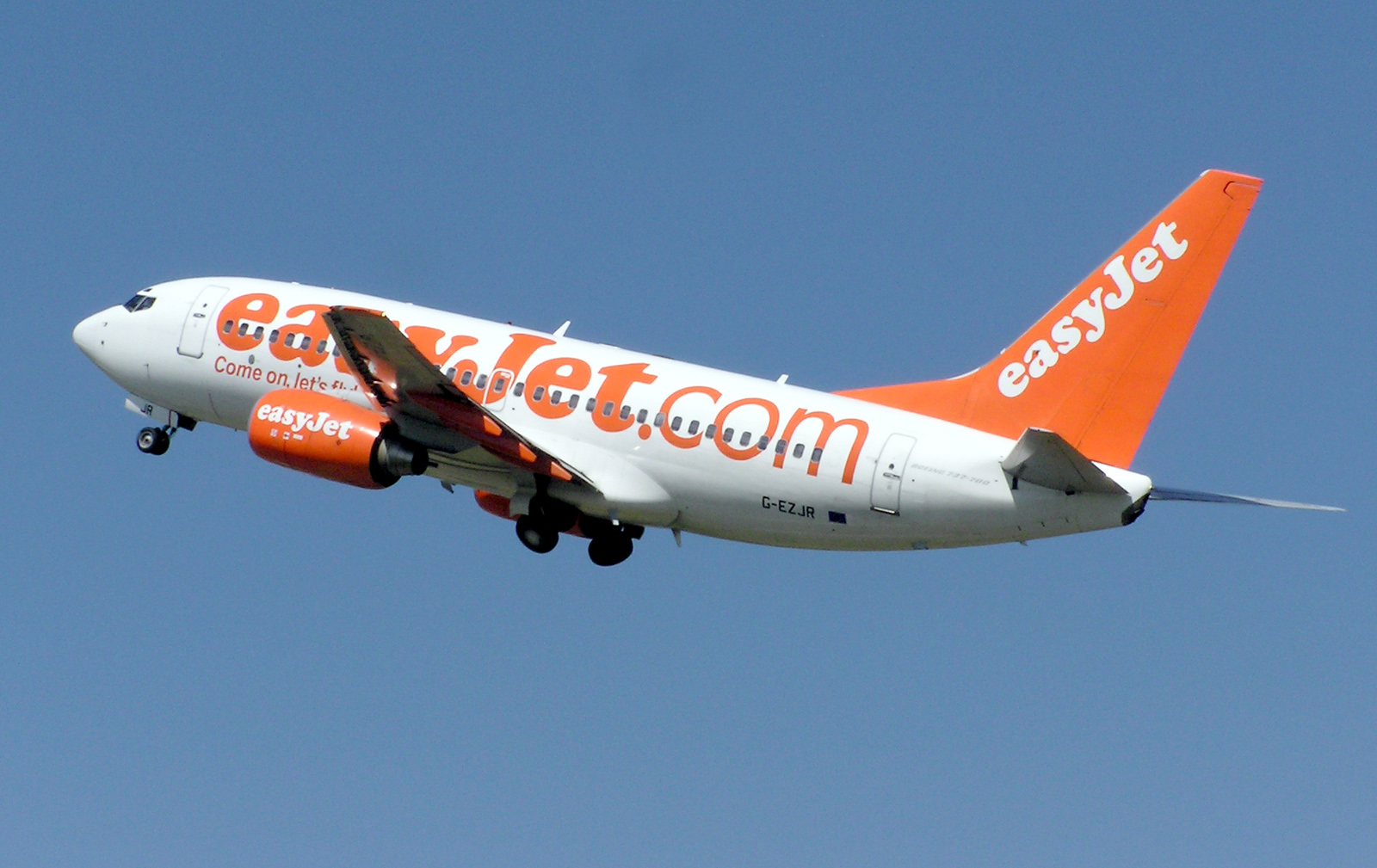
easyJet, one of the no-frills carriers that has changed air travel in the UK in recent years

Tourism is an industry where the influence of air transport services is more obvious. In 2005 some 22 million overseas visitors arrived by air, spending around £12 billion (1.1 per cent of GDP) and supporting 170,000 jobs in the tourist industry. In the same year air travel also accounted for 36 million trips abroad by UK tourists, and UK tourists as a whole spend twice as much abroad as overseas visitors spend in the UK. This has led to the assertion that aviation represents a "net negative effect" on the UK tourism industry, and that restraining demand for air travel would encourage more domestic tourism, with the consequent economic benefit of reducing the tourism deficit.

Exports and imports by air in 2005 were estimated at £62.7 billion and £59.6 billion respectively, with a significant majority of air freight operations being conducted with countries outside of the EU, and express freight operations transporting 5 per cent by value of all UK exports in 2004. Whilst export/import facilities provide opportunities for international trade and competition, they are not without negative effect, and British horticulture is one example of domestic industry damaged by cheap imports.

=== Forecast economic outlook ===
Attempts to quantify the economic effects of growth in the air transport sector generate results which depend on assumptions made, and therefore the viewpoint of the organisation making the analysis. The OEF study has produced a figure of £2.5 billion per annum of additional GDP by 2015 for Heathrow, or £7 billion per annum by 2030 if a third runway is built there. Full implementation of the White Paper runway proposals resulted in a forecast yield of an additional £13 billion per annum in GDP by 2030. Calculations done for the AEF, based on a new runway at Stansted, and which assume increased taxation of the industry, result in a negative economic benefit.

== Environmental effects ==
External costs, also referred to as hidden costs, are quantifications of the environmental and climate effects of air transport. Whilst setting a financial value on all such effects is difficult to do precisely, figures have been produced for the most significant. In 2000 the government valued the annual cost of climate change induced by greenhouse gas emissions from UK air transport at £1.4 billion, rising to £4.8 billion per annum by 2030. The effect of noise was costed at around £25 million per annum in 2000, and for the same year the effect on air quality was costed at between £119 million and £236 million per annum. Based on figures produced by the European Environment Agency the AEF has calculated a much higher total external cost for 2000 of around £6 billion.

=== Global environmental effects ===
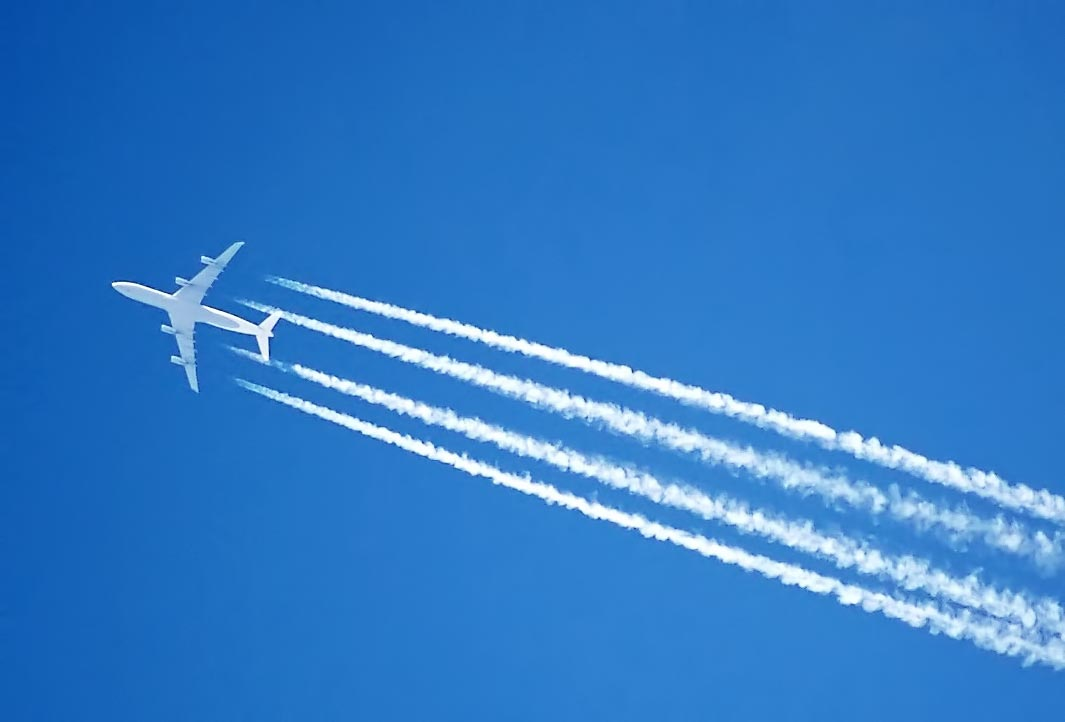
Contrails over London

Whilst carbon emissions from all UK activities other than aviation had declined by 9 per cent in the 10 years between 1990 and 2000, carbon emissions from aviation activities doubled in the same period. Air transport in the UK accounted for 6.3 per cent of all UK carbon emissions in 2006. When the radiative forcing effect of other emissions are taken into account the total effect of emissions attributable to aviation is estimated to be twice that of its carbon emissions alone. Although the government has committed to reducing total UK carbon emissions by 60 per cent from existing levels by 2050, its policy is based on the use of "... economic instruments to ensure that growing industries are catered for within a reducing total." Even if this reduction in total carbon emissions is achieved, research published in February 2006 concluded that aviation could account for between 24 per cent and 50 per cent of the UK's carbon budget by 2050.

The government recognises that there are no viable alternative aviation fuels, and whilst it accepts that the exemption of aviation fuel from fuel tax is anomalous, it sees no scope for a unilateral approach in addressing this. The strategy adopted in the White Paper seeks to mitigate the global effects of air transport primarily through emissions trading schemes. Although the Kyoto Protocol implemented emissions trading as a means to reduce emissions at national levels, the global nature of air transport means that all air travel is excluded from this mechanism. The government is seeking to redress this through the International Civil Aviation Organization (ICAO), which has been working on the environmental issue since 1998, but progress is slow. In the meantime efforts are being made to include aviation in the EU Emission Trading Scheme (EU ETS) with an original target to implement this by 2008. In 2006 the government re-affirmed this policy as the best approach for addressing the climate change effects of aviation, and current proposals aim at accomplishing this for all flights within the EU by 2011, with the scheme being extended to include all flights to and from the EU the following year.

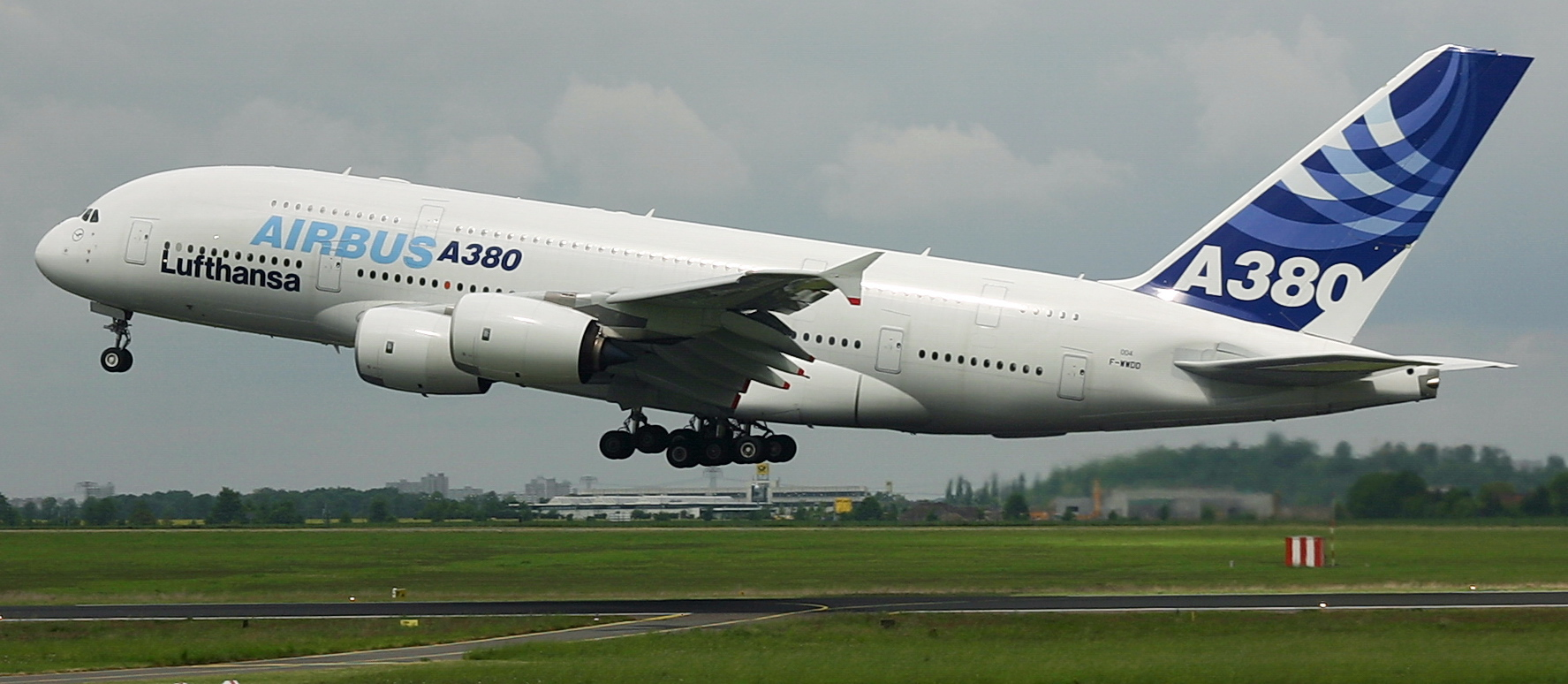
The Airbus A380 is cleaner and quieter than previous generations of airliners.

The aviation industry is seeking to reduce its climate change effects by becoming more fuel efficient, and in the last 40 years fuel efficiency has more than doubled. In June 2005, Sustainable Aviation; a joint initiative involving a number of UK airlines, airports, manufacturers and the air traffic service provider NATS, was launched with a vision statement relating to environmental issues of "...removing or minimising any negative impacts on the local and global environment...". One of its commitments is to achieve, by means of airframe, engine and air traffic management improvements, a 50% reduction in CO_{2} emissions, and an 80% reduction in NO_{x} emissions in new aircraft of 2020 relative to new aircraft in 2000. These are however long term aspirations, and whilst progress is being made in engine development, the more immediate efforts of Sustainable Aviation to address climate change are directed towards supporting research, common reporting of emissions, emissions trading, and personal offsetting.

Critics of an expansionist policy consider the EU ETS to be too late and to price carbon too low to adequately mitigate the climate change effects of aviation emissions. Instead they advocate addressing these effects by constraining demand for air travel. The study Predict and Decide – Aviation, climate change and UK policy, noting that a 10 per cent increase in fares generates a 5 to 15 per cent reduction in demand, recommends that the government should seek an alternative aviation policy based on managing demand rather than providing for it. This would be accomplished via a strategy that presumes "... against the expansion of UK airport capacity" and constrains demand by the use of economic instruments to price air travel less attractively. In another study the levying of £9 billion of taxes is calculated to constrain the forecast growth in demand by 2030 to 315 million passengers, reducing the annual rate of growth to 2 per cent. The environmental message is echoed in the ninth report of the House of Commons Environmental Audit Select Committee, published in July 2006, which labels the government strategy a predict and provide model and expresses scepticism about the timescale and efficiency of the EU ETS. It recommends instead that the government rethinks its airport expansion policy and considers ways, particularly via increased taxation, in which future demand can be managed in line with industry performance in achieving fuel efficiencies, so that emissions are not allowed to increase in absolute terms.

=== Local environmental effects ===
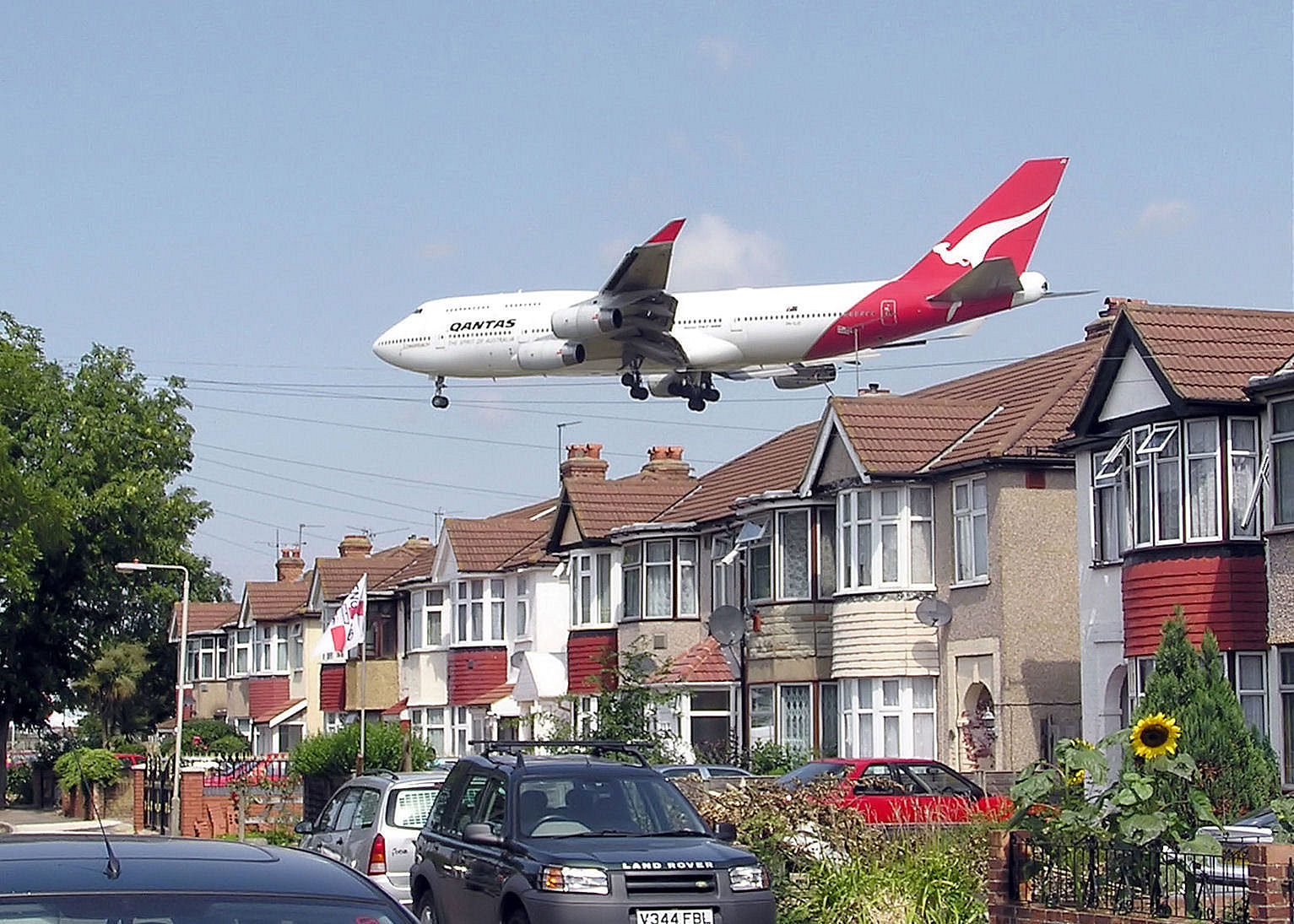
Qantas Boeing 747-400 landing at Heathrow, 2004

Under the provisions of the Civil Aviation Act aircraft in flight are specifically exempted from trespass and nuisance controls, which denies any form of redress to those living near airports who are disturbed by noise. Government sanctioned measurements of noise near airports take an average sound level, measured in decibels (dB), over a 16‑hour day, and are expressed as an LAeq figure. Officially, 57 dB LAeq is the threshold at which noise levels become disturbing, 63 dB LAeq represents moderate disturbance, whilst 69 dB LAeq represents high disturbance. Technological improvements in aircraft design means that aircraft are becoming quieter. Taking Heathrow as an example, between 1990 and 2004 the area around the airport affected by noise levels of 57 db LAeq and above fell by 60 per cent, whilst the number of people similarly affected fell by 51 per cent. Campaign groups dispute the methodology used to measure noise, asserting that it is flawed in a number of ways. Amongst other issues they point to the World Health Organisation view that annoyance begins at 50 db LAeq whilst serious annoyance begins at 55 dB LAeq, and they assert that the LAeq measurement does not give sufficient weight to the increasing incidence of noise events. Their conclusion is that noise levels, and the number of people affected, have increased rather than decreased. This is borne out by the latest survey of attitudes to noise published in November 2007 which reports that, compared with over 20 years ago, more people today are annoyed by the same level of noise as measured by LAeq. Whilst this may be attributable to changing attitudes, the report concludes that the contribution of aircraft numbers to annoyance has increased, and that an alternative method of estimating levels of annoyance that takes this into account would appear to be more relevant than the LAeq measurement. The report has attracted criticism in peer reviews, and one such review, characterising the survey as inconclusive, counsels "... against using the detailed results and conclusions [...] in the development of government policy."

Air quality around airports is another major issue and a 2006 study found that levels of nitrogen dioxide exceeds EU guidelines at more than two-thirds of airports surveyed. Whilst aircraft contribute to the problem the study states that "...cars, buses and taxis ferrying passengers to and from these sites are dominant sources of pollution." Birmingham airport dismissed the findings, asserting that the results were skewed by M42 motorway traffic unrelated to the airport, whilst studies at Southampton Airport attribute 5.55 per cent of total pollutants to airport activities, the majority of the remainder being generated by non-airport related road traffic. The government recognises Heathrow as the only UK airport where national and European air quality limits are being exceeded.

A provision of the original Civil Aviation Act allows designated airports to be required to provide facilities for consultation with affected parties, where local environmental concerns can be raised, and some 51 airports have been so designated. A 2000 consultation by the government re-iterated its policy that generally, local issues arising from airport operations are best addressed locally. To support this the Civil Aviation Act was extended in 2006 to give all airports the authority to mandate measures to address noise and air quality issues beyond their boundaries, and to impose financial penalties on aircraft which fail or are unable to adhere to such measures. The Civil Aviation Act 2006 also extends the provisions of section 78 of the original act, augmenting the powers of the Secretary of State to intervene directly in operations at designated airports; currently Heathrow, Gatwick and Stansted, "...for the purpose of avoiding, limiting or mitigating the effect of noise and vibration connected with aircraft landing or taking off." The largest airports also implement voluntary schemes to assist local communities in coping with the local effects of airport operations. Birmingham Airport, for example, has been operating a sound insulation scheme since 1978, in which 7,600 properties are eligible for sound proof glazing paid for by the airport. Schemes are also available to residents most affected by noise around Heathrow, designed to protect property prices ahead of any development of a third runway, assist with relocation costs for people who wish to move, and provide sound insulation for private and communal property currently affected by noise. In both cases local residents have also set up campaign groups; Birmingham Airport anti-Noise Group, and HACAN Clearskies at Heathrow, to represent themselves over local environmental issues arising from airport operations. Even the smallest of airports engaged in air transport operations; Gloucestershire Airport, has attracted organised opposition to its plans to extend the main runway there, and the umbrella group AirportWatch lists over 20 local airport campaign groups.

== See also ==
- Environmental effects of aviation
- Greenhouse gas emissions by the United Kingdom
- Flying Matters – industry coalition
- Hypermobility
- Plane Stupid
- Stop Stansted Expansion – pressure group
