= Flying Matters =

United Kingdom pro-aviation coalition (2007–2011)

Flying Matters was a pro-aviation coalition in the United Kingdom. Members included tourist organisations, airlines, aerospace manufacturers, trade associations, airport operators, growers and others. Formed in June 2007, they have issued briefings, press releases, lobbied Members of Parliament and commissioned advertisements. The organisation was wound up at the end of April 2011 following the withdrawal of four founding members including BA, BAA and Virgin Atlantic.

== Staff ==
Brian Wilson, Chairman was frequently quoted in the press representing Flying Matters. He was a Labour Party member of parliament from 1987 to 2005 and Energy Minister at the Department of Trade and Industry from 2001 to 2003. Michelle Di Leo, Director is a public affairs practitioner who has also worked for Airport Operators Association and on the 'Freedom To Fly' campaign in 2003 during the lead up to the Aviation White Paper. Until recently she was a partner in a strategic communications consultancy and has also worked for the National Union of Teachers and the British Lung Foundation. The Steering Group consisted of representatives of the major members and was chaired by Toby Nicol, Communications and Corporate Affairs Director at easyJet.

== Members ==
The Flying Matters coalition included trade associations such as the Airport Operators Association, Air Transport Users Council, British Air Transport Association, Society of British Aerospace Companies and Tourism Alliance. Tourism bodies and travel agents were also well represented with members including Association of British Travel Agents, Association of Corporate Travel Executives, First Choice, MyTravel and Thomas Cook. A number of airlines operators and manufacturers were members including Airbus, Boeing, British Airways, EasyJet, Flybe, Monarch, Rolls-Royce and Virgin Atlantic, as were two airport operators BAA and Manchester Airport. Trade unions included Transport and General Workers Union, Unite - The Union and GMB Union. In addition to the above Farmers Own (growers) and the Fresh Produce Consortium (importers), DHL (freight), Nats (air traffic control), Macquarie Group (finance) and Qinetiq (defence) was also members. A full list was available on their main website.

== History ==
=== 2007 ===
The organisation was formed early in 2007 and was very busy during the year. They commissioned various polls and attended the party conferences arguing that in particular that the Conservatives' position on aviation to limit aviation growth would lose them votes. They lobbied against restrictions of airport growth generally and were frequently quoted in the press.

The first public news of the organisation was released in May in Brand Republic and in Airport News. The organisation was formally launched late in July with the stated aim of showing that the aviation sector was "taking climate change seriously". They accused Inuit leader of "apocalyptic green spin" at the official enquiry over the expansion of Stansted Airport and respond the Conservative Party policy of limiting aviation growth and gave their first details off their proposed advertising campaign featuring "No Entry" signs in front of the Taj Mahal and Sydney Opera House

In August BAA, a Flying Matters member, applied for the "mother of all injunctions" against the Camp for Climate Action which was to be held near Heathrow airport in August. and won a much reduced injunction and the protest camp arrives close to Heathrow Flying Matters published a number of briefings: "Aviation and Climate Change", "Aviation and Tourism", Aviation and the UK economy, "Aviation and trade with the developing world" and "Aviation and People".

In September, Flying Matters attended the UK Party conferences. At the Labour conference, they sponsored a fringe meeting entitled "going Green" at which Brian Wilson was "taken to task as he defended the growth of airports and spoke against higher taxes". An aide to Ken Livingstone, the Labour Mayor of London, proposed a tax on "frivolous fliers" - Brian Wilson is quoted as saying: "Deeply offensive, I have never heard of a bigger suicide pill politically than curbing frivolous flights."

The Conservative Party proposed increased taxes on flights and cars and Brian Wilson is quoted as saying, "Taxes which increase the cost of flying will simply price working families out of flying".

In the run-up to the Conservative Party conference, Flying Matters issued press releases titled "Voters in key marginals shun Conservative proposals for higher taxes on air travel", "'Green' holiday tax plan puts Conservatives 6 per cent behind Labour in 30 most important marginals in the Country" and "US, China and India bear most responsibility for climate change according to new poll"

They contributed to a discussions at the Liberal Democrats party conference.

In October, they issued press releases "Soil Association should not undermine its objectives by potentially damaging producers in the developing world with unrealistic demands" and Brian Wilson is quoted as saying "Unless teleportation becomes viable in the next few years there is no alternative for them (Kenyan farmers) to get their fresh produce to market in time.". Flying Matters accuse Plane Stupid of irresponsibility and Plane Stupid accuse Flying Matters of spying

In December, Private Eye reported on a Flying Matters in relation to the Labour Party Conference and Plane Stupid published a copy of a letter sent privately to MPs lobbying on the Climate Change Bill. Flying Matters issued a press release saying that "Stopping new runways would cost half a million new UK jobs"

=== 2008-2011 ===
In October 2008 they announced that after discussion with Pret a Manger and Innocent Drinks, they had both changed their public policy with regard to air freight. Pret a Manger had previously stated, "We believe airfreighting fruit and veg is completely over the top. It's unnecessary and, with the exception of basil leaves (and in the case of an emergency), we don't do it. At certain times of the year, basil lets us down. We're working hard to find a supplier closer to home." After an approach from the Fresh Produce Consortium and Blue Skies they changed their message to "These are challenging questions with no simple answers. We tackle them, one by one. We listen to the arguments and weigh up the evidence. Fingers crossed, we make the right decisions. For instance, whilst we do not airfreight our fruit and veg, we understand that for many farmers, particularly in developing countries, airfreight is an important way to get goods to market and that those goods contribute a great deal towards social and economic development. It’s a sustainability conundrum". Smoothie manufacturer Innocent has removed all references to airfreight from its website.

In response to a parliamentary vote in October 2008 to approve the Climate Change Bill, committing Britain to slashing greenhouse gas emissions by 80 per cent by 2050 and for the first time including aviation and shipping into the bill, Michelle Di Leo, director Flying Matters, said it was a "hollow victory" for environmentalists that was both "ineffective and unfair".

The organisation was wound up at the end of April 2011 following the withdrawal of BA, BAA, Manchester Airports Group and Virgin Atlantic.

== See also ==
- Aviation and the environment
- Aviation Environment Federation, the principal UK non-profit making organisation concerned with the environmental effects of aviation
- Plane Stupid, a UK focused non-violent direct action group
- Air transport and the environment (United Kingdom)
