= Environmental impact of aviation =

Effect of emissions from aircraft engines

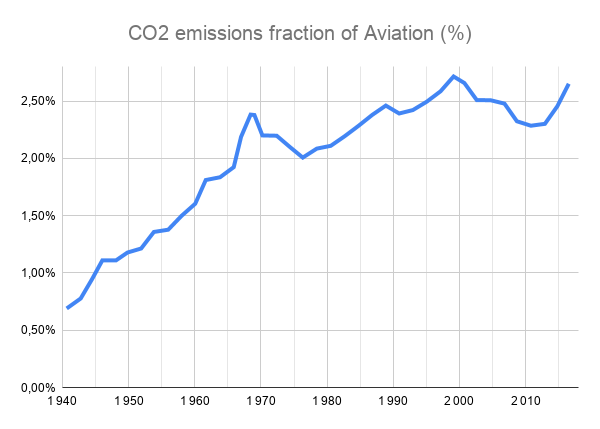
Between 1940 and 2018, aviation CO_{2} emissions grew from 0.7% to 2.65% of all CO_{2} emissions

Aircraft engines produce gases, noise, and particulates from fossil fuel combustion, raising environmental concerns over both global impacts and their effects on local air quality. Jet airliners contribute to climate change via their exhaust, which contains carbon dioxide (CO_{2}), nitrogen oxides, and particulates, and which can lead to the formation of contrails under certain atmospheric conditions. Excluding the effect of contrail-induced cirrus clouds (which is not accurately quantified), the radiative forcing of jet exhaust is estimated at 1.3–1.4 times that of CO_{2} alone. In 2018, global commercial operations generated 2.4% of all CO_{2} emissions.

Jet airliners became about 70% more fuel efficient between 1967 and 2007, and CO_{2} emissions per revenue ton-kilometer (RTK) in 2018 were 47% of those in 1990. In 2018, CO_{2} emissions averaged 88 grams of CO_{2} per revenue passenger per km. While the aviation industry is more fuel efficient, overall emissions have risen as the volume of air travel has increased. By 2020, aviation emissions were 70% higher than in 2005 and they could grow by 300% by 2050.

Aircraft noise pollution disrupts sleep, children's education and could increase cardiovascular risk. Airports can generate water pollution due to their extensive handling of jet fuel and deicing chemicals if not contained, contaminating nearby water bodies. Aviation activities emit ozone and ultrafine particles, both of which are health hazards. Piston engines used in general aviation burn Avgas, releasing toxic lead.

Aviation's environmental footprint can be reduced by better fuel economy in aircraft, or air traffic control and flight routes can be optimized to lower non-CO_{2} effects on climate from NO_{x}, particulates or contrails. Aviation biofuel, emissions trading and carbon offsetting, part of the ICAO's CORSIA, can lower CO_{2} emissions. Aviation usage can be lowered by short-haul flight bans, train connections, personal choices and aviation taxation and subsidies. Fuel-powered aircraft may be replaced by hybrid electric aircraft and electric aircraft or by hydrogen-powered aircraft. Since 2021, the IATA members plan net-zero carbon emissions by 2050, followed by the ICAO in 2022.

== Climate change ==
=== Factors ===
Radiative forcings from aviation emissions, estimated in 2020

Airplanes emit gases (carbon dioxide, water vapor, nitrogen oxides or carbon monoxide − bonding with oxygen to become CO_{2} upon release) and atmospheric particulates (incompletely burned hydrocarbons, sulfur oxides, black carbon), interacting among themselves and with the atmosphere. While the main greenhouse gas emission from powered aircraft is CO_{2}, jet airliners contribute to climate change in four ways as they fly in the tropopause:

Carbon dioxide (CO_{2})
CO_{2} emissions are the most significant and best understood contribution to climate change. The effects of CO_{2} emissions are similar regardless of altitude. Airport ground vehicles, those used by passengers and staff to access airports, emissions generated by airport construction and aircraft manufacturing also contribute to the greenhouse gas emissions from the aviation industry.

Nitrogen oxides (NO_{x}, nitric oxide and nitrogen dioxide)
In the tropopause, emissions of NO_{x} favor ozone (O_{3}) formation in the upper troposphere. At altitudes from 8 to 13 km (26,000 to 43,000 ft), NO_{x} emissions result in greater concentrations of O_{3} than surface NO_{x} emissions and these in turn have a greater global warming effect. The effect of O_{3} surface concentrations are regional and local, but it becomes well mixed globally at mid and upper tropospheric levels. NO_{x} emissions also reduce ambient levels of methane, another greenhouse gas, resulting in a climate cooling effect, though not offsetting the O_{3} forming effect. Aircraft sulfur and water emissions in the stratosphere tend to deplete O_{3}, partially offsetting the NO_{x}-induced O_{3} increases, although these effects have not been quantified. Light aircraft and small commuter aircraft fly lower in the troposphere, not in the tropopause.

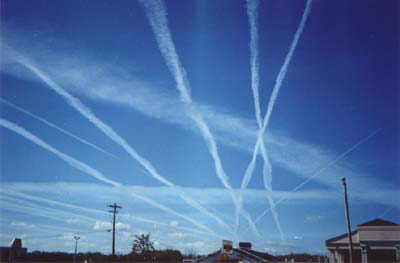
Contrails and cirrus clouds

Contrails and cirrus clouds
Fuel burning produces water vapor, which condenses at high altitude, under cold and humid conditions, into visible line clouds: condensation trails (contrails). They are thought to have a global warming effect, though less significant than CO_{2} emissions. Contrails are uncommon from lower-altitude aircraft. Cirrus clouds can develop after the formation of persistent contrails and can have an additional global warming effect. Their global warming contribution is uncertain and estimating aviation's overall contribution often excludes cirrus cloud enhancement.

Particulates
Compared with other emissions, sulfate and soot particles have a smaller direct effect: sulfate particles have a cooling effect and reflect radiation, while soot has a warming effect and absorbs heat, while the clouds' properties and formation are influenced by particles. Contrails and cirrus clouds evolving from particles may have a greater radiative forcing effect than CO_{2} emissions. As soot particles are large enough to serve as condensation nuclei, they are thought to cause the most contrail formation. Soot production may be decreased by reducing the aromatic compound of jet fuel.

In 1999, the IPCC estimated aviation's radiative forcing in 1992 to be 2.7 (2 to 4) times that of CO_{2} alone − excluding the potential effect of cirrus cloud enhancement. This was updated for 2000, with aviation's radiative forcing estimated at 47.8 mW/m^{2}, 1.9 times the effect of CO_{2} emissions alone, 25.3 mW/m^{2}.

In 2005, research by David S. Lee, et al., published in the scientific journal Atmospheric Environment estimated the cumulative radiative forcing effect of aviation as 55 mW/m^{2}, which is twice the 28 mW/m^{2} radiative forcing effect of the cumulative CO_{2} emissions alone, excluding induced cirrus clouds. In 2012, research from Chalmers university estimated this weighting factor at 1.3–1.4 if aviation induced cirrus is not included, 1.7–1.8 if they are included (within a range of 1.3–2.9). This ratio depends on how aviation activity grows. If the growth is exponential then the ratio is constant. But if the growth stops, the ratio will go down because the CO_{2} in the atmosphere due to aviation will continue to go up, whereas the other effects will stagnate.

Uncertainties remain on the NO_{x}–O_{3}–CH_{4} interactions, aviation-produced contrails formation, the effects of soot aerosols on cirrus clouds and measuring non-CO_{2} radiative forcing.

In 2018, CO_{2} represented 34.3 mW/m^{2} of aviation's effective radiative forcing (ERF, on the surface), with a high confidence level (± 6 mW/m^{2}), NO_{x} 17.5 mW/m^{2} with a low confidence level (± 14) and contrail cirrus 57.4 mW/m^{2}, also with a low confidence level (± 40). All factors combined represented 43.5 mW/m^{2} (1.27 that of CO_{2} alone) excluding contrail cirrus and 101 mW/m^{2} (±45) including them, 3.5% of the anthropogenic ERF of 2290 mW/m^{2} (± 1100). Again, it must be remembered that the effect of CO_{2} accumulates from year to year, unlike the effect of contrails and cirrus clouds.

=== Volume ===
By 2018, airline traffic reached 4.3 billion passengers with 37.8 million departures, an average of 114 passengers per flight and 8.26 trillion RPKs, an average journey of 1,920 km (1,040 nmi), according to ICAO. The traffic was experiencing continuous growth, doubling every 15 years, despite external shocks − a 4.3% average yearly growth and Airbus forecasts expect the growth to continue. While the aviation industry is more fuel efficient, halving the amount of fuel burned per flight compared to 1990 through technological advancement and operations improvements, overall emissions have risen as the volume of air travel has increased. Between 1960 and 2018, RPKs increased from 109 to 8,269 billion.

In 1992, aircraft emissions represented 2% of all man-made CO_{2} emissions, having accumulated a little more than 1% of the total man-made CO_{2} increase over 50 years. By 2015, aviation accounted for 2.5% of global CO_{2} emissions. In 2018, global commercial operations emitted 918 million tonnes (Mt) of CO_{2}, 2.4% of all CO_{2} emissions: 747 Mt for passenger transport and 171 Mt for freight operations. Between 1960 and 2018, CO_{2} emissions increased 6.8 times from 152 to 1,034 million tonnes per year. Emissions from flights rose by 32% between 2013 and 2018.

Aviation GHG emissions within the European Economic Area for the EU ETS, showing the top 10 emitters (2013–2019).

Between 1990 and 2006, greenhouse gas emissions from aviation increased by 87% in the European Union. In 2010, about 60% of aviation emissions came from international flights, which are outside the emission reduction targets of the Kyoto Protocol. International flights are not covered by the Paris Agreement, either, to avoid a patchwork of individual country regulations. That agreement was adopted by the International Civil Aviation Organization, however, capping airlines carbon emissions to the year 2020 level, while allowing airlines to buy carbon credits from other industries and projects.

In 1992, aircraft radiative forcing was estimated by the IPCC at 3.5% of the total man-made radiative forcing.

=== Per passenger ===
Between 1950 and 2018, efficiency per passenger grew from 0.4 to 8.2 RPK per kg of CO_{2}.

As it accounts for a large share of their costs, 28% by 2007, airlines have a strong incentive to lower their fuel consumption, reducing their environmental footprint. Jet airliners have become 70% more fuel efficient between 1967 and 2007. Jetliner fuel efficiency improves continuously, 40% of the improvement come from engines and 30% from airframes. Efficiency gains were larger early in the jet age than later, with a 55–67% gain from 1960 to 1980 and a 20–26% gain from 1980 to 2000.

The average fuel burn of new aircraft fell 45% from 1968 to 2014, a compounded annual reduction of 1.3% with variable reduction rate. By 2018, CO_{2} emissions per revenue ton-kilometer (RTK) were more than halved compared to 1990, at 47%. The aviation energy intensity went from 21.2 to 12.3 MJ/RTK between 2000 and 2019, a 42% reduction.

In 2018, CO_{2} emissions totalled 747 million tonnes for passenger transport, for 8.5 trillion revenue passenger kilometres (RPK), giving an average of 88 gram CO_{2} per RPK. The UK's Department for BEIS calculate a long-haul flight release 102 g of CO_{2} per passenger kilometre, and 254 g of CO_{2} equivalent, including non-CO_{2} greenhouse gas emissions, water vapor etc.; for a domestic flight in Britain.

The ICAO targets a 2% efficiency improvement per year between 2013 and 2050, while the IATA targets 1.5% for 2009–2020 and to cut net CO_{2} emissions in half by 2050 relative to 2005.

=== Evolution ===
In 1999, the IPCC estimated aviation's radiative forcing may represent 190 mW/m^{2} or 5% of the total man-made radiative forcing in 2050, with the uncertainty ranging from 100 to 500 mW/m^{2}. If other industries achieve significant reductions in greenhouse gas emissions over time, aviation's share, as a proportion of the remaining emissions, could rise.

Alice Bows-Larkin estimated that the annual global CO_{2} emissions budget would be entirely consumed by aviation emissions to keep the climate change temperature increase below 2 °C by mid-century. Given that growth projections indicate that aviation will generate 15% of global CO_{2} emissions, even with the most advanced technology forecast, she estimated that to hold the risks of dangerous climate change to under 50% by 2050 would exceed the entire carbon budget in conventional scenarios.

In 2013, the National Center for Atmospheric Science at the University of Reading forecast that increasing CO_{2} levels will result in a significant increase in in-flight turbulence experienced by transatlantic airline flights by the middle of the 21st century. This prediction is supported by data showing that incidents of severe turbulence increased by 55% between 1979 and 2020, attributed to changes in wind velocity at high altitudes.

Aviation CO_{2} emissions grow despite efficiency innovations to aircraft, powerplants and flight operations. Air travel continue to grow.

In 2015, the Center for Biological Diversity estimated that aircraft could generate 43 Gt of carbon dioxide emissions through 2050, consuming almost 5% of the remaining global carbon budget. Without regulation, global aviation emissions may triple by mid-century and could emit more than 3 Gt of carbon annually under a high-growth, business-as-usual scenario. Many countries have pledged emissions reductions for the Paris Agreement, but the sum of these efforts and pledges remains insufficient and not addressing airplane pollution would be a failure despite technological and operational advancements.

The International Energy Agency projects aviation share of global CO_{2} emissions may grow from 2.5% in 2019 to 3.5% by 2030.

By 2020, global international aviation emissions were around 70% higher than in 2005 and the ICAO forecasts they could grow by over further 300% by 2050 in the absence of additional measures.

By 2050, aviation's negative effects on climate could be decreased by a 2% increase in fuel efficiency and a decrease in NO_{x} emissions, due to advanced aircraft technologies, operational procedures and renewable alternative fuels decreasing radiative forcing due to sulfate aerosol and black carbon.

== Noise ==
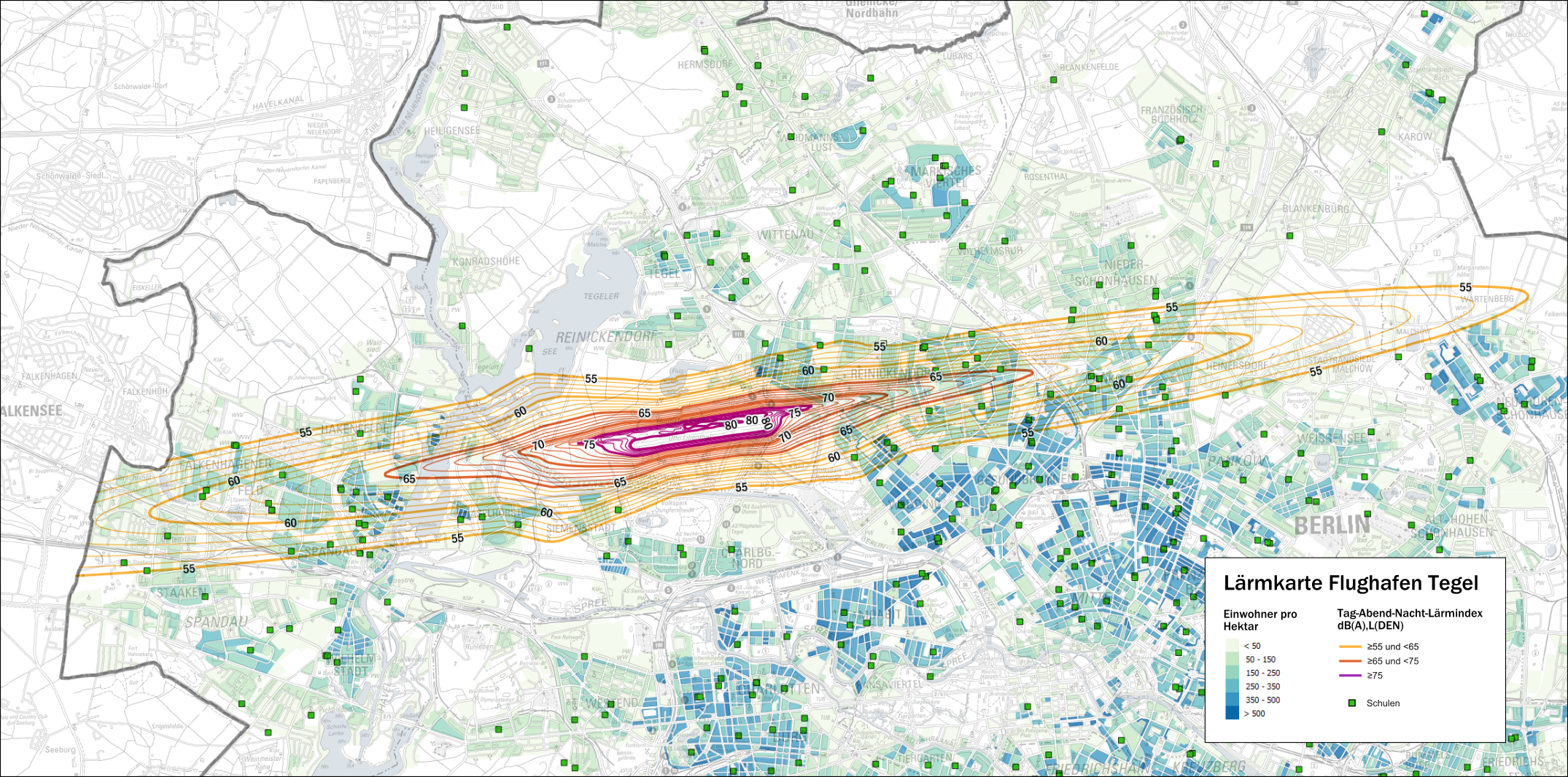
Noise map of Berlin Tegel Airport

Air traffic causes aircraft noise, which disrupts sleep, adversely affects children's school performance and could increase cardiovascular risk for airport neighbours. Sleep disruption can be reduced by banning or restricting flying at night, but disturbance progressively decreases and legislation differs across countries.

The ICAO Chapter 14 noise standard applies for aeroplanes submitted for certification after 31 December 2017, and after 31 December 2020 for aircraft below 55 t (121,000 lb), 7 EPNdB (cumulative) quieter than Chapter4. The FAA Stage 5 noise standards are equivalent. Higher bypass ratio engines produce less noise. The PW1000G is presented as 75% quieter than previous engines. Serrated edges or 'chevrons' on the back of the nacelle reduce noise.

A Continuous Descent Approach (CDA) is quieter as less noise is produced while the engines are near idle power. CDA can reduce noise on the ground by ~1–5 dB per flight.

== Water pollution ==
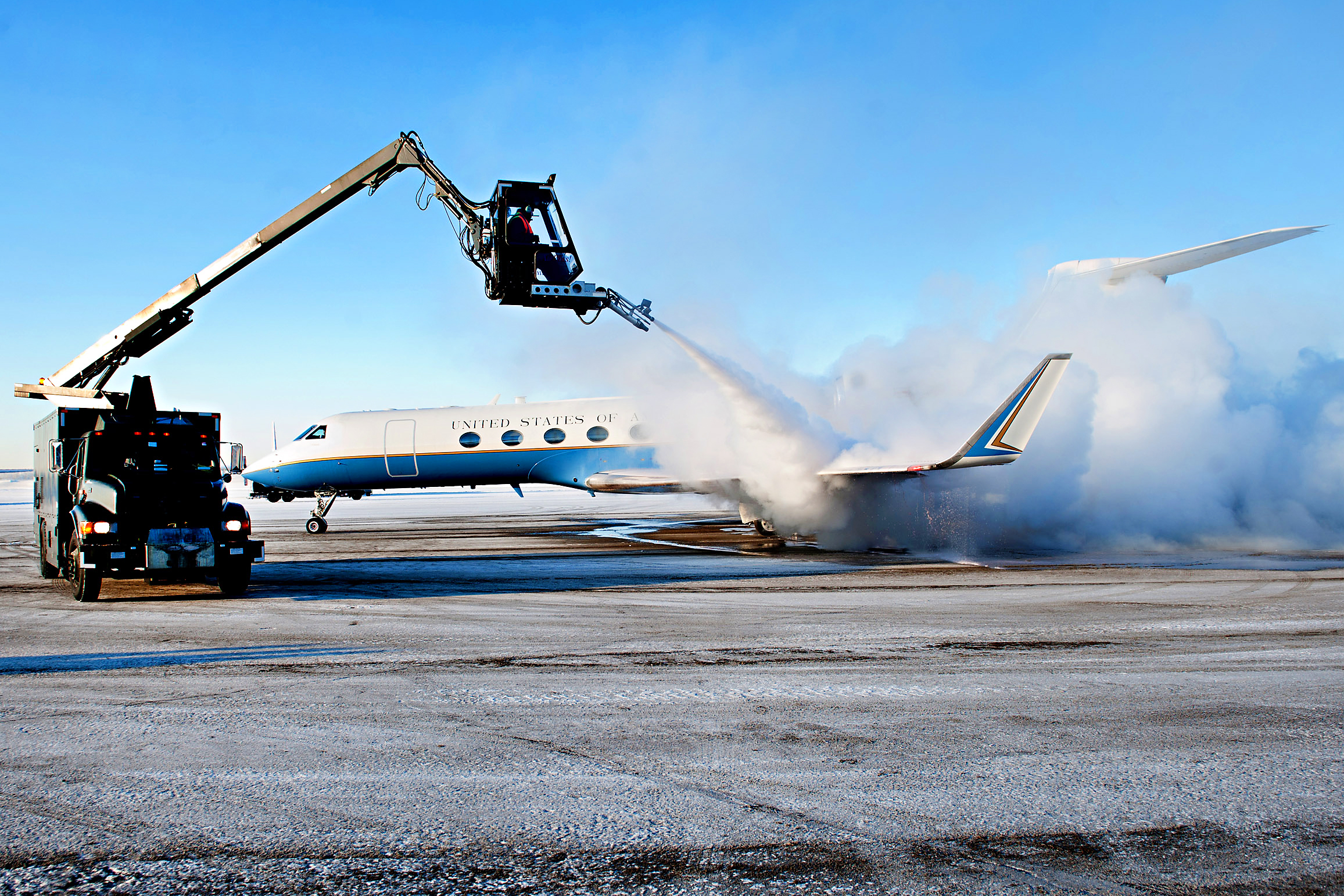
Excess aircraft deicing fluid may contaminate nearby water bodies

Airports can generate significant water pollution due to their extensive use and handling of jet fuel, lubricants and other chemicals. Chemical spills can be mitigated or prevented by spill containment structures and clean-up equipment such as vacuum trucks, portable berms and absorbents.

Deicing fluids used in cold weather can pollute water, as most of them fall to the ground and surface runoff can carry them to nearby streams, rivers or coastal waters. Deicing fluids are based on ethylene glycol or propylene glycol. Airports use pavement deicers on paved surfaces including runways and taxiways, which may contain potassium acetate, glycol compounds, sodium acetate, urea or other chemicals.

During degradation in surface waters, ethylene and propylene glycol exert high levels of biochemical oxygen demand, consuming oxygen needed by aquatic life. Microbial populations decomposing propylene glycol consume large quantities of dissolved oxygen (DO) in the water column. Fish, macroinvertebrates and other aquatic organisms need sufficient dissolved oxygen levels in surface waters. Low oxygen concentrations reduce usable aquatic habitat because organisms die if they cannot move to areas with sufficient oxygen levels. Bottom feeder populations can be reduced or eliminated by low DO levels, changing a community's species profile or altering critical food-web interactions.

Glycol-based deicing fluids are toxic to humans and other mammals. Research into non-toxic alternative deicing fluids is ongoing.

== Air pollution ==
Aviation is the main human source of ozone, a respiratory health hazard, causing an estimated 6,800 premature deaths per year.

Aircraft engines emit ultrafine particles (UFPs) in and near airports, as does ground support equipment. During takeoff, 3 to 50 × 10^{15} particles were measured per kg of fuel burned, while significant differences are observed depending on the engine. Other estimates include 4 to 200 × 10^{15} particles for 0.1–0.7 gram, or 14 to 710 × 10^{15} particles, or 0.1–10 × 10^{15} black carbon particles for 0.046–0.941 g.

In the United States, 167,000 piston aircraft engines, representing three-quarters of private airplanes, burn Avgas, releasing lead into the air. The Environmental Protection Agency estimated this released 34,000 tons of lead into the atmosphere between 1970 and 2007. The Federal Aviation Administration recognizes inhaled or ingested lead leads to adverse effects on the nervous system, red blood cells, and cardiovascular and immune systems. Lead exposure in infants and young children may contribute to behavioral and learning problems and lower IQ.

== Private jet travel ==
A 2024 study published in Communications Earth & Environment revealed that carbon dioxide emissions from private jet travel surged to 15.6 million tonnes in 2023, a 46% increase compared to 2019. Despite serving only 256,000 individuals—approximately 0.003% of the global population—the industry contributes significantly to greenhouse gas emissions.

The research further highlights that nearly half of these flights covered distances shorter than 500 kilometers. Moreover, many flights involved empty legs, where aircraft traveled without passengers, often for repositioning or ferry flights.

The private jet industry is poised for further growth, with projections indicating a 33% increase in the global fleet to 26,000 aircraft by 2033.

== Mitigation ==
Aviation's environmental footprint can be mitigated by reducing air travel, optimizing flight routes, capping emissions, restricting short-distance flights, increasing taxation and decreasing subsidies to the aviation industry. Technological innovation could also mitigate damage to the environment and climate, for example, through the development of electric aircraft, biofuels, and increased fuel efficiency.

In 2016, the International Civil Aviation Organization (ICAO) committed to improve aviation fuel efficiency by 2% per year and to keeping the carbon emissions from 2020 onwards at the same level as those from 2010. To achieve these goals, multiple measures were identified: more fuel-efficient aircraft technology; development and deployment of sustainable aviation fuels (SAFs); improved air traffic management (ATM); market-based measures like emission trading, levies, and carbon offsetting, the Carbon Offsetting and Reduction Scheme for International Aviation (CORSIA).

In December 2020, the UK Climate Change Committee said that: "Mitigation options considered include demand management, improvements in aircraft efficiency (including use of hybrid electric aircraft), and use of sustainable aviation fuels (biofuels, biowaste to jet and synthetic jet fuels) to displace fossil jet fuel."

In February 2021, Europe's aviation sector unveiled its Destination 2050 sustainability initiative towards zero CO_{2} emissions by 2050:

- aircraft technology improvements for 37% emission reductions;
- SAFs for 34%;
- economic measures for 8%;
- ATM and operations improvements for 6%;

while air traffic should grow by 1.4% per year between 2018 and 2050. The initiative is led by ACI Europe, ASD Europe, A4E, CANSO and ERA. This would apply to flights within and departing the European single market and the UK.

In October 2021, the IATA committed to net-zero carbon emissions by 2050. In 2022, the ICAO agreed to support a net-zero carbon emission target for 2050.

The aviation sector could be decarbonized by 2050 with moderate demand growth, continuous efficiency improvements, new short-haul engines, higher SAF production and CO_{2} removal to compensate for non-CO_{2} forcing. With constant air transport demand and aircraft efficiency, decarbonizing aviation would require nearly five times the 2019 worldwide biofuel production, competing with other hard-to-decarbonize sectors, and 0.2 to 3.4 Gt of CO_{2} removal to compensate for non-CO_{2} forcing. Carbon offsets would be preferred if carbon credits are less expensive than SAFs, but they may be unreliable, while specific routing could avoid contrails. As of 2023, fuel represents 20–30% of the airlines' operating costs, while SAF is 2–4 times more expensive than fossil jet fuel. Projected cost decreases of green hydrogen and carbon capture could make synthetic fuels more affordable, and lower feedstock costs and higher conversion efficiencies would help FT and HEFA biofuels. Policy incentives like cleaner aviation fuel tax credits and low-carbon fuel standards could induce improvements, and carbon pricing could render SAFs more competitive, accelerating their deployment and reducing their costs through learning and economies of scale.

According to a 2023 Royal Society study, reaching net zero would need replacing fossil aviation fuel with a low or zero carbon energy source, as battery technologies are unlikely to give enough specific energy. Biofuels can be introduced quickly and with little aircraft modification, but are restricted by scale and feedstock availability, and few are low-carbon. Producing enough renewable electricity to produce green hydrogen would be a costly challenge and would need substantial aircraft and infrastructure modification. Synthetic fuels would need little aircraft modification, but necessitates green hydrogen feedstock and large scale direct CO_{2} air capture at high costs. Low-carbon Ammonia would also need costly green hydrogen at scale, and would need substantial aircraft and infrastructure modifications.

In its Sixth Assessment Report, the IPCC notes that sustainable biofuels, low-emissions hydrogen, and derivatives (including ammonia and synthetic fuels) can support mitigation of CO_{2} emissions but some hard-to-abate residual GHG emissions remain and would need to be counterbalanced by deployment of carbon dioxide removal methods. On 29 March 2003, during a Senate hearing, hydrogen propulsion proponents like ZeroAvia or Universal Hydrogen bemoaned that the incumbents like GE Aerospace or Boeing were supporting sustainable aviation fuel (SAF) because it does not require major changes to existing infrastructure.

An April 2023 report of the Sustainable Aero Lab estimate current in-production aircraft will be the vast majority of the 2050 fleet as electric aircraft will not have enough range and hydrogen aircraft will not be available soon enough : the main decarbonisation drivers will be SAF; replacing regional jets with turboprop aircraft; and incentives to replace older jets with new generation ones.

The airline industry faces a significant climate challenge due to the scarcity of clean fuel options, exemplified by the recent establishment of LanzaJet Inc.'s $200 million facility in Georgia, the first to convert ethanol into jet engine-compatible fuel, with an annual production target of 9 million gallons of sustainable aviation fuel (SAF). This volume, however, is minuscule compared to the global demand, as evidenced by the world's airlines consuming 90 billion gallons of jet fuel last year, and even major airlines like IAG SA (parent company of British Airways) using only 0.66% of their total fuel consumption as SAF, with a goal to increase this to 10% by 2030. Incentives such as the $1.75 per gallon SAF credit offered by the US Inflation Reduction Act, set to expire in 2027, aim to boost SAF usage, while L.E.K. Consulting forecasts that alcohol-to-jet technology will become the dominant source of SAF by the mid-next decade. Meanwhile, emerging technologies like e-kerosene, though potentially reducing climate impacts significantly, face economic challenges as they cost nearly seven times more than traditional jet fuel, and the future of 45 proposed power-to-liquids plants in Europe remains uncertain, according to Transport & Environment.

=== Technology improvements ===
==== Electric aircraft ====
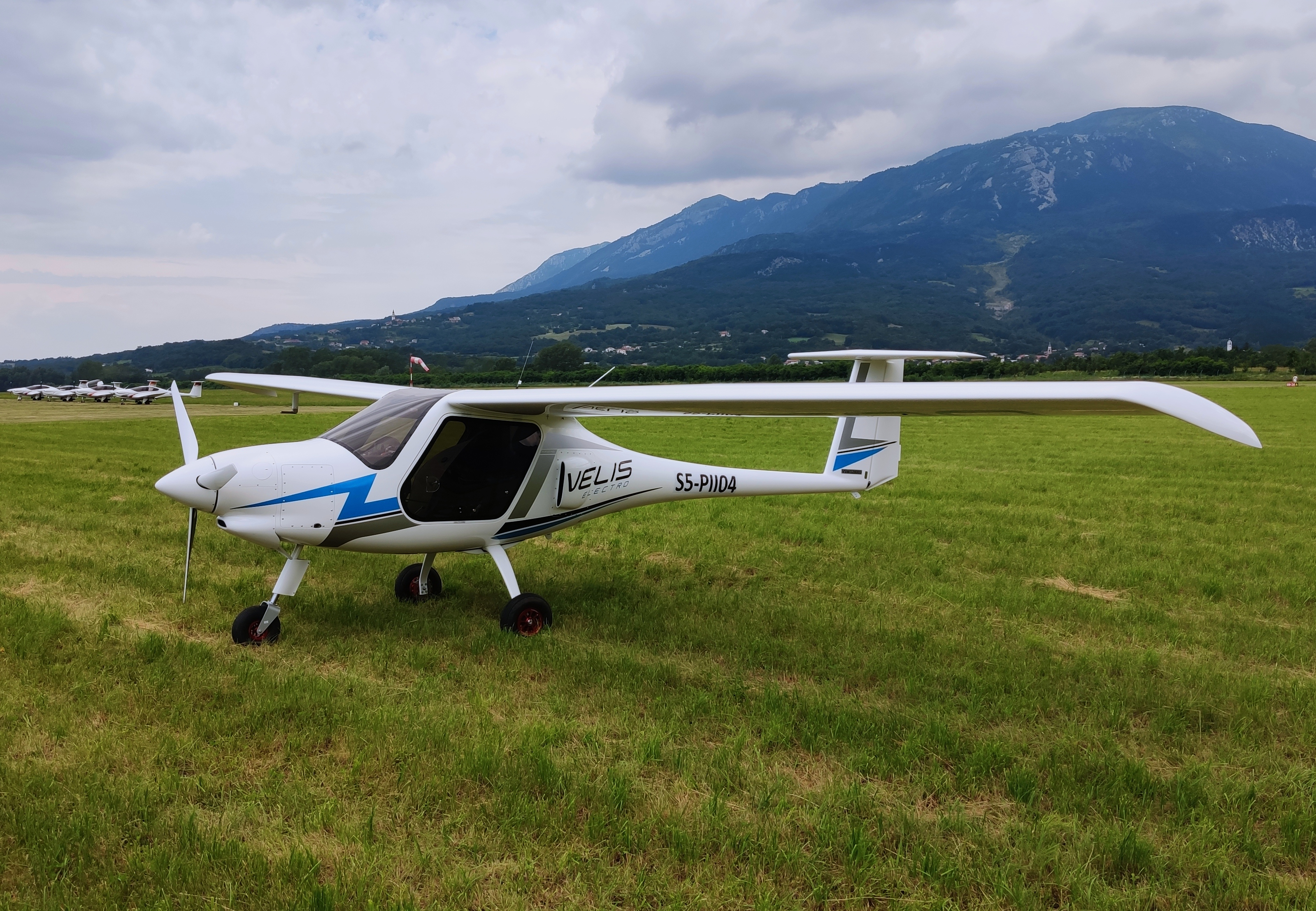
The Velis Electro was the first type certificated electric aircraft on 10 June 2020.

Electric aircraft operations do not produce any emissions and electricity can be generated by renewable energy. Lithium-ion batteries including packaging and accessories gives a 160 Wh/kg energy density while aviation fuel gives 12,500 Wh/kg. As electric machines and converters are more efficient, their shaft power available is closer to 145 Wh/kg of battery while a gas turbine gives 6,555 Wh/kg of fuel: a 45:1 ratio. For Collins Aerospace, this 1:50 ratio forbids electric propulsion for long-range aircraft. By November 2019, the German Aerospace Center estimated large electric planes could be available by 2040. Large, long-haul aircraft are unlikely to become electric before 2070 or within the 21st century, whilst smaller aircraft can be electrified. As of May 2020, the largest electric airplane was a modified Cessna 208B Caravan.

For the UK's Committee on Climate Change (CCC), huge technology shifts are uncertain, but consultancy Roland Berger points to 80 new electric aircraft programmes in 2016–2018, all-electric for the smaller two-thirds and hybrid for larger aircraft, with forecast commercial service dates in the early 2030s on short-haul routes like London to Paris, with all-electric aircraft not expected before 2045. Berger predicts a 24% CO_{2} share for aviation by 2050 if fuel efficiency improves by 1% per year and if there are no electric or hybrid aircraft, dropping to 3–6% if 10-year-old aircraft are replaced by electric or hybrid aircraft due to regulatory constraints, starting in 2030, to reach 70% of the 2050 fleet. This would greatly reduce the value of the existing fleet of aircraft, however. Limits to the supply of battery cells could hamper their aviation adoption, as they compete with other industries like electric vehicles. Lithium-ion batteries have proven fragile and fire-prone and their capacity deteriorates with age. However, alternatives are being pursued, such as sodium-ion batteries.

==== Hydrogen-powered aircraft ====
In 2020, Airbus unveiled liquid-hydrogen-powered aircraft concepts as zero-emissions airliners, poised for 2035. Aviation, like industrial processes that cannot be electrified, could use primarily Hydrogen-based fuel.

A 2020 study by the EU Clean Sky 2 and Fuel Cells and Hydrogen 2 Joint Undertakings found that hydrogen could power aircraft by 2035 for short-range aircraft. A short-range aircraft (< 2,000 km, 1,100 nmi) with hybrid Fuel cell/Turbines could reduce climate impact by 70–80% for a 20–30% additional cost, a medium-range airliner with H_{2} turbines could have a 50–60% reduced climate impact for a 30–40% overcost, and a long-range aircraft (> 7,000 km, 3,800 nmi) also with H_{2} turbines could reduce climate impact by 40–50% for a 40–50% additional cost. Research and development would be required, in aircraft technology and into hydrogen infrastructure, regulations and certification standards.

==== Sustainable aviation fuels (SAF) ====
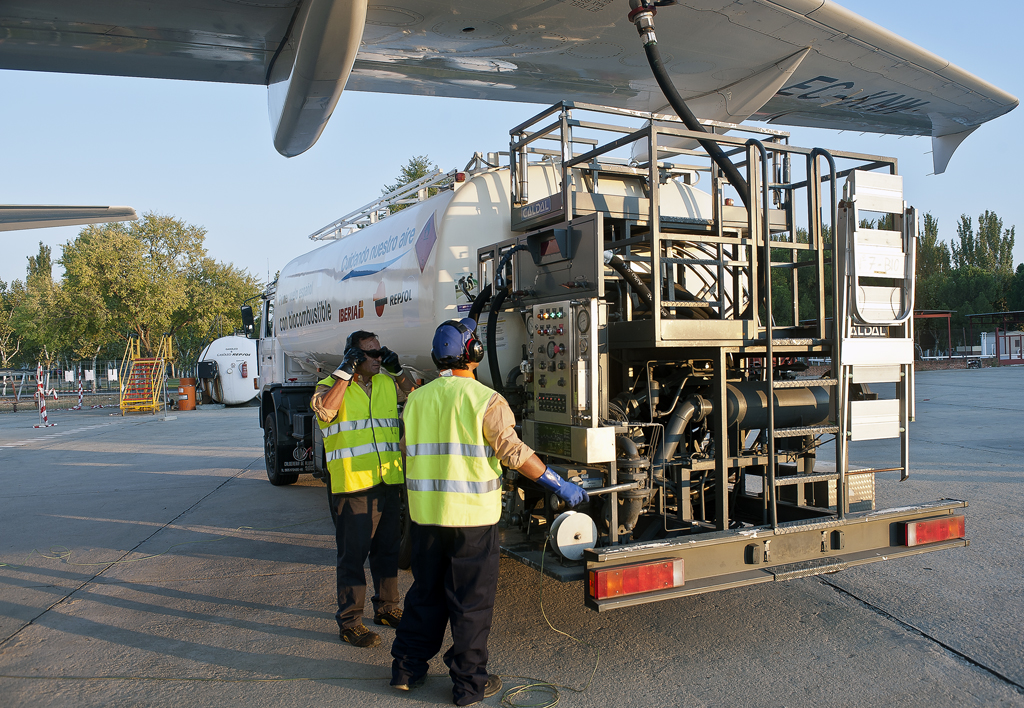
Refueling an Airbus A320 with biofuel in 2011

An aviation biofuel (also known as bio-jet fuel, bio-aviation fuel (BAF), semi-synthetic jet fuel, or sustainable aviation fuel (SAF)) is a biofuel used to power aircraft. The International Air Transport Association (IATA) considers it a key element in reducing the environmental impact of aviation. Aviation biofuel can be used to decarbonize otherwise hard-to-decarbonise medium and long-haul air travel via "drop-in-replacement" which does not require extensive modification to aircraft engine design. Synthetic paraffinic kerosene (SPK) refers to any non-petroleum-based hydrocarbon mixture designed as a blending component or complete replacement of kerosene jet fuel.

Not all bio-fuels are produced in a sustainable manner. Typically sustainable aviation fuel is certified as being sustainable by a third-party organisation and may benefit from emissions trading or carbon-credit schemes depending on local laws.

Biofuels are biomass-derived fuels from plants, animals, or waste; depending on which type of biomass is used, they could lower CO_{2} emissions by 20–98% compared to conventional jet fuel. The first test flight using blended biofuel was in 2008, and in 2011, blended fuels with 50% biofuels were allowed on commercial flights. In 2023 SAF production was 600 million liters, representing 0.2% of global jet fuel use. By 2024, SAF production was to increase to 1.3 billion liters (1 million tonnes), representing 0.3% of global jet fuel consumption and 11% of global renewable fuel production. This increase came as major US production facilities delayed their ramp-up until 2025, having initially been expected to reach 1.9 billion liters.

Aviation biofuel can be produced from upgraded plant or animal sources such as Jatropha, algae, tallows, waste oils, palm oil, Babassu, and Camelina (bio-SPK); from solid biomass using pyrolysis processed with a Fischer–Tropsch process (FT-SPK); with an alcohol-to-jet (ATJ) process from waste fermentation; or from synthetic biology through a solar reactor. Pathways which use electricity-derived hydrogen as a feedstock are called Electrofuels or e-fuels. Small piston engines can be modified to burn ethanol as a replacement for aviation gasoline.

==== Electrofuels (e-fuels) ====
The Potsdam Institute for Climate Impact Research reported a €800–1,200 mitigation cost per ton of CO_{2} for hydrogen-based e-fuels. Those could be reduced to €20–270 per ton of CO_{2} in 2050, but maybe not early enough to replace fossil fuels. Climate policies could bear the risk of e-fuel uncertain availability, and Hydrogen and e-fuels may be prioritised when direct electrification is inaccessible.

==== Aircraft with lower design speed and altitude ====
According to a research project focusing on short to medium range passenger aircraft, design for subsonic instead of transonic speed (about 15% less speed) would save 21% of fuel compared to an aircraft of conventional design speed and similar characteristics in terms of size, range and expected general technology improvements. The lower mach number and turboprop instead of turbofan propulsion leads to lower flight altitude with a disproportionately high reduction in Non-CO_{2} emissions. Thus, over 60% climate impact reduction can be potentially achieved by such advanced turboprop aircraft compared to current short to medium range passenger aircraft, yet before switching to synthetic fuels.

=== Reducing air travel ===
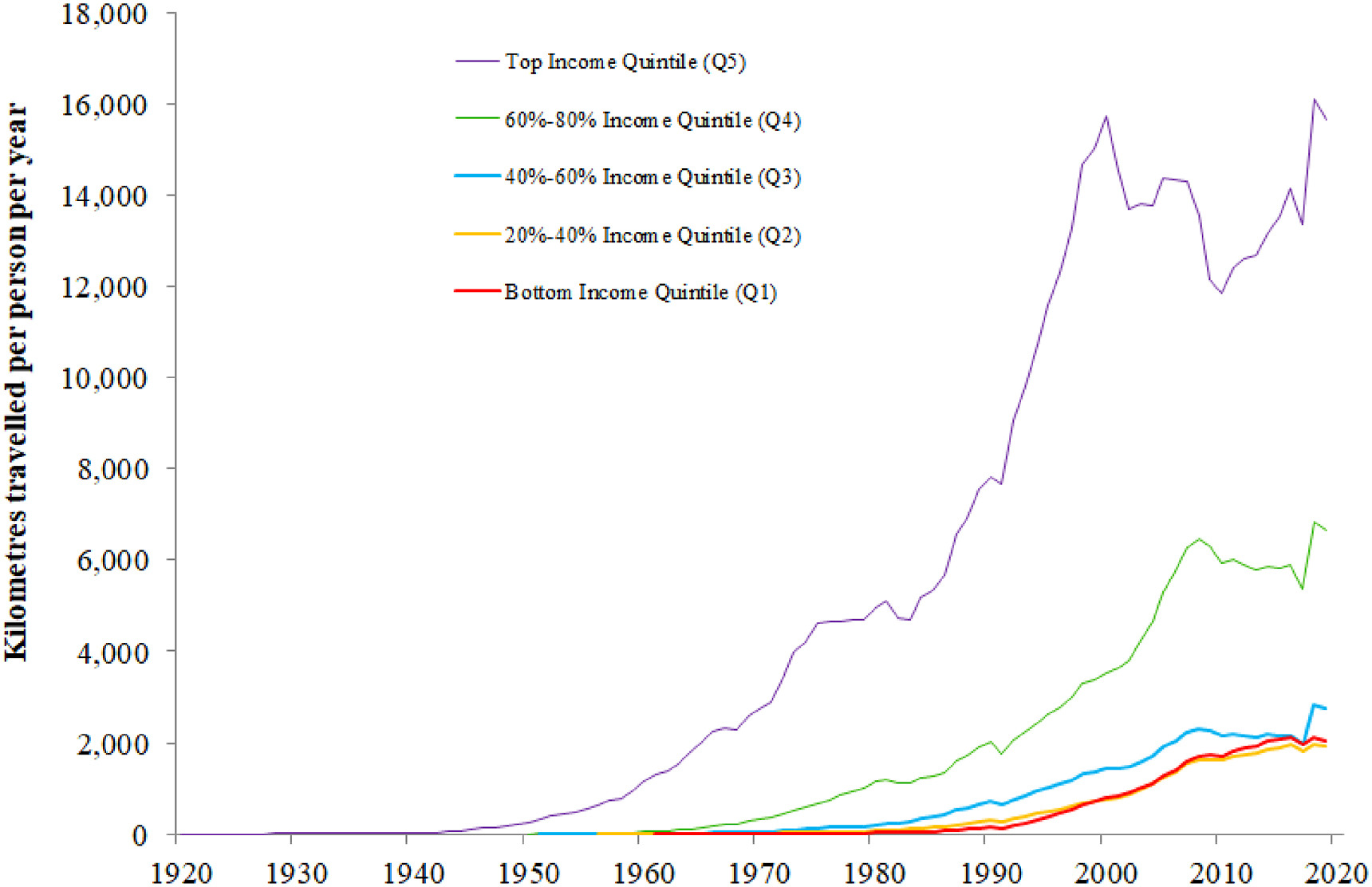
UK air travel by income quintile through time

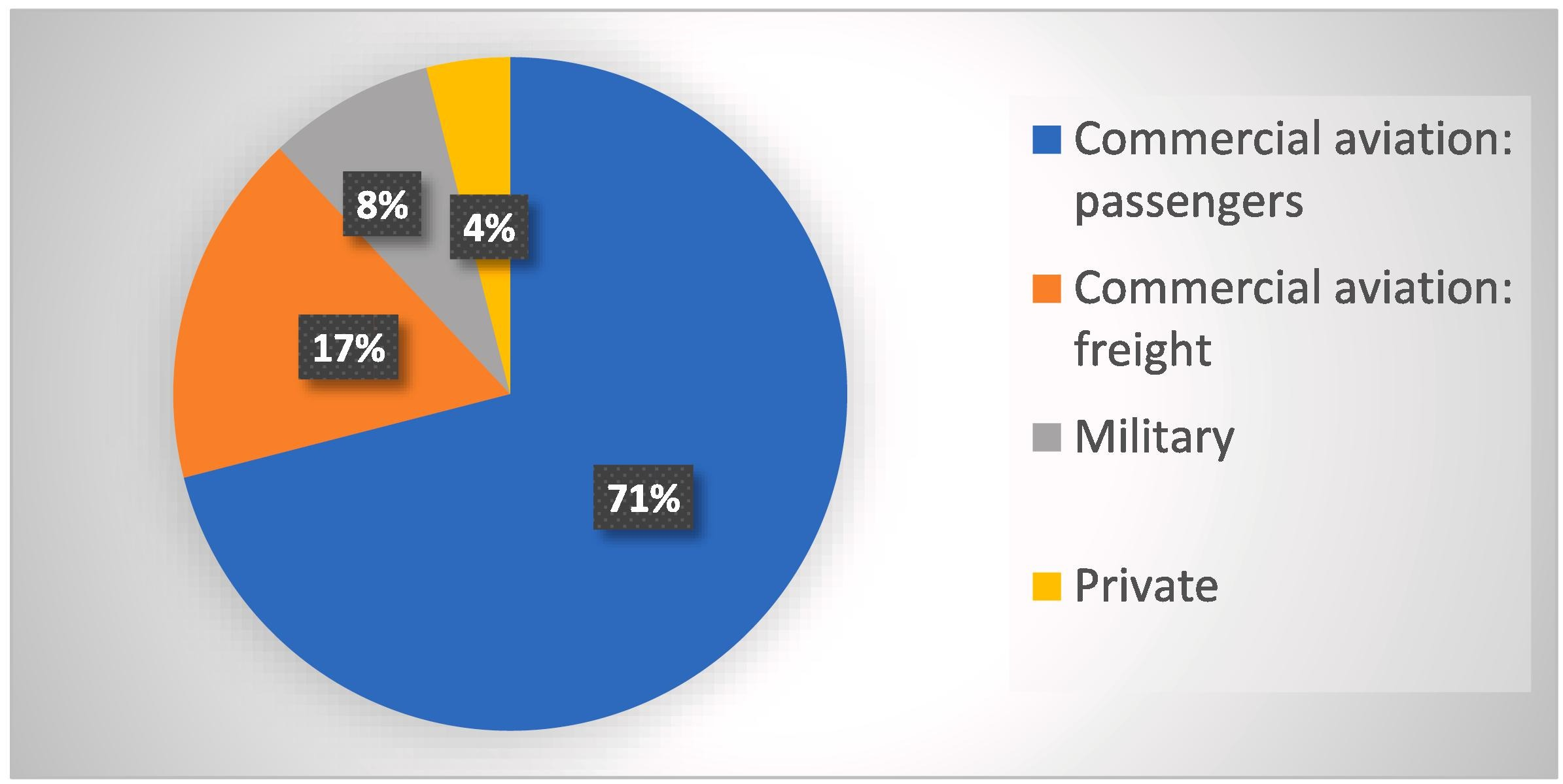
Global distribution of aviation fuel use

Aviation is one of three sectors identified in a study where "demand-side options" can have a large effect in "reaching SDS levels". According to a study, the attainment of the 1.5–2 °C global temperature goal necessitates substantial demand reductions in the critical sectors of aviation, shipping, road freight, and industry, should large-scale negative emissions not be realized. According to the IMAGE model used to project scenarios aimed at limiting global temperature increases to 1.5 °C and 2 °C, it is suggested that achieving deep decarbonization within the aviation sector within the specified timeframe is contingent upon a reduction in air travel in certain markets. The decreases in carbon intensity of aviation energy in net-zero scenarios "are heavily dependent on projected changes in aviation demand and energy intensity". The significant challenges of sustainable aviation fuel expansion, including food security, local community impacts, and land use issues, underscore the importance of simultaneous demand reduction efforts. For instance, according to a report by the Royal Society, to produce enough biofuel to supply the UK's aviation industry would require using half of Britain's farming land which would put major pressures on food supplies.

Tourism is projected to generate up to 40% of total global CO_{2} emissions by 2050. Of climate change mitigation consumption options investigated by a review, the consumption options with "the highest mitigation potential advocate reduction in car and air travel". A study projected a potential reduction of "transport direct CO_{2} emissions by around 50% in the end of the century compared to the baseline" via combined behavioral factors.

==== Measures ====
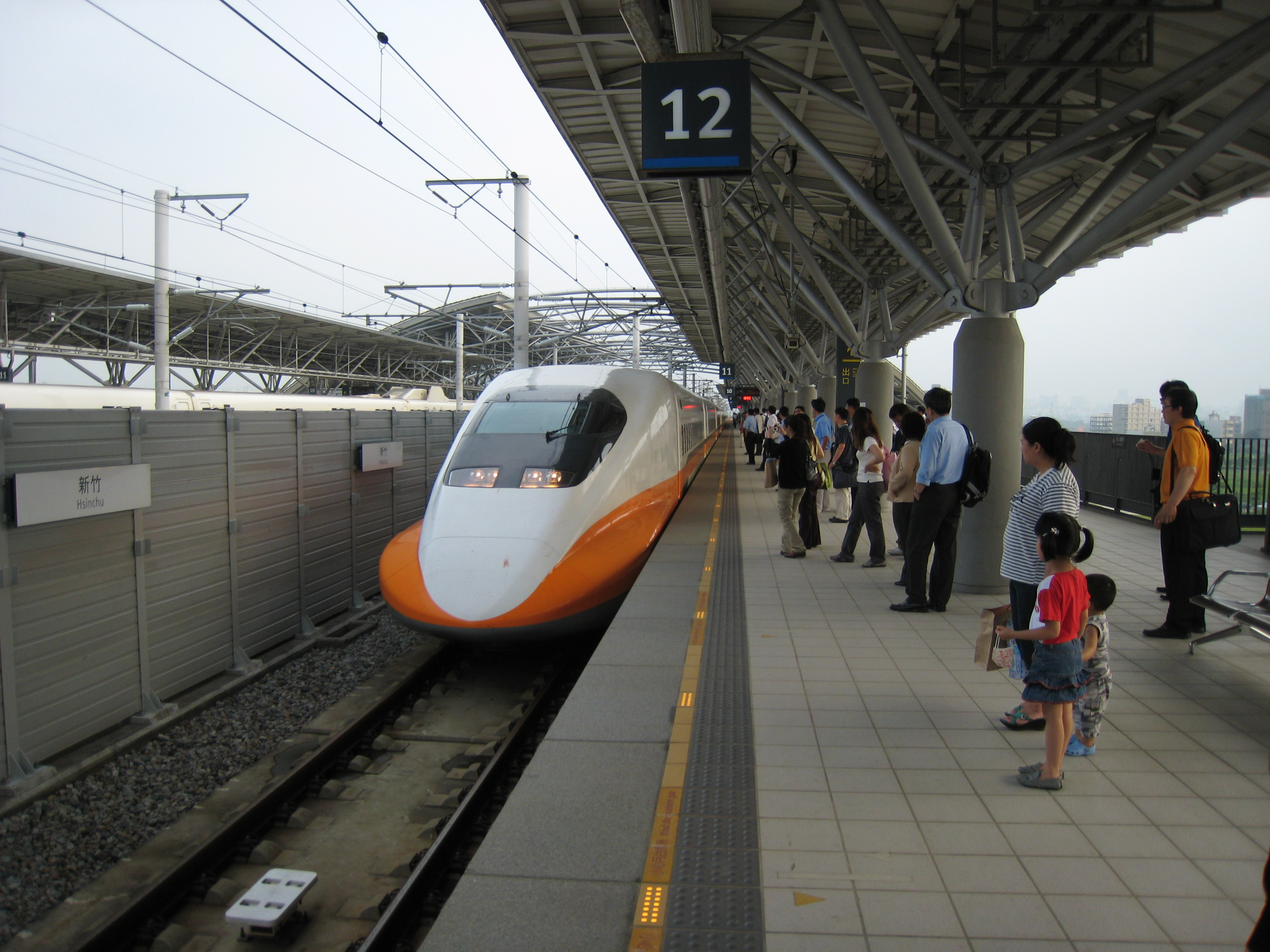
The Taiwan High Speed Rail in 2007

According to the IPCC Sixth Assessment Report, "the greatest Avoid potential" in demand-side mitigation, which consists of Avoid-Shift-Improve (ASI) options, "comes from reducing long-haul aviation and providing short-distance low-carbon urban infrastructure". It lists the following related mobility measures:

- Avoid: integrate transport & land use planning, tele-working, fewer long-haul flights, local holidays
- Shift: from air travel to high-speed rail

It found that socio-cultural factors promoting a preference for train travel over long-haul flights have the potential to reduce aviation greenhouse gas emissions by 10% to 40% by 2050.

The ICCT estimates that 3% of the global population take regular flights. Stefan Gössling of the Western Norway Research Institute estimates 1% of the world population emits half of commercial aviation's CO_{2}, while close to 90% does not fly in a given year.

Per capita emissions from domestic and international flights

In early 2022, the European Investment Bank published the results of its 2021–2022 Climate Survey, showing that 52% of Europeans under 30, 37% of people between 30 and 64 and 25% for people aged 65 and above plan to travel by air for their summer holidays in 2022; and 27% of those under 30, 17% for people aged 30–64 and 12% for people aged 65 and above plan to travel by air to a faraway destination.

Short-haul flight ban

A short-haul flight ban is a prohibition imposed by governments on airlines to establish and maintain a flight connection over a certain distance, or by organisations or companies on their employees for business travel using existing flight connections over a certain distance, in order to mitigate the environmental impact of aviation (most notably to reduce anthropogenic greenhouse gas emissions which is the leading cause of climate change). In the 21st century, several governments, organisations and companies have imposed restrictions and even prohibitions on short-haul flights, stimulating or pressuring travellers to opt for more environmentally friendly means of transportation, especially trains.

Flight shame
In Sweden the concept of "flight shame" or "flygskam" has been cited as a cause of falling air travel. Swedish rail company SJ AB reports that twice as many Swedish people chose to travel by train instead of by air in summer 2019 compared with the previous year. Swedish airports operator Swedavia reported 4% fewer passengers across its 10 airports in 2019 compared to the previous year: a 9% drop for domestic passengers and 2% for international passengers.

Personal allowances
Climate change mitigation can be backed by Personal carbon allowances (PCAs) where all adults receive "an equal, tradable carbon allowance that reduces over time in line with national targets." Everyone would have a share of allowed carbon emissions and would need to trade further emissions allowances. An alternative would be rationing everyone's flights: an "individual cap on air travel, that people can trade with each other".

=== Economic measures ===
==== Emissions trading ====
CO_{2} price in the European Union Emission Trading Scheme

ICAO has endorsed emissions trading to reduce aviation CO_{2} emission, guidelines were to be presented to the 2007 ICAO Assembly. Within the European Union, the European Commission has included aviation in the European Union Emissions Trading Scheme operated since 2012, capping airline emissions, providing incentives to lower emissions through more efficient technology or to buy carbon credits from other companies. The Centre for Aviation, Transport and Environment at Manchester Metropolitan University estimates the only way to lower emissions is to put a price on carbon and to use market-based measures like the EU ETS.

==== Taxation and subsidies ====
Financial measures can discourage airline passengers and promote other transportation modes and motivates airlines to improve fuel efficiency. Aviation taxation include:

- air passenger taxes, paid by passengers for environmental reasons, may be variable by distance and include domestic flights;
- departure taxes, paid by passengers leaving the country, sometimes also applies outside aviation;
- jet fuel taxes, paid by airlines for the consumed jet fuel. Jet fuel taxation is applied in the United States, but banned in the European Union.

Consumer behavior can be influenced by cutting subsidies for unsustainable aviation and subsidising the development of sustainable alternatives. By September–October 2019, a carbon tax on flights would be supported by 72% of the EU citizens, in a poll conducted for the European Investment Bank.

Aviation taxation could reflect all its external costs and could be included in an emissions trading scheme. International aviation emissions escaped international regulation until the ICAO triennial conference in 2016 agreed on the CORSIA offset scheme. Due to low or nonexistent taxes on aviation fuel, air travel has a competitive advantage over other transportation modes.

=== Carbon offsetting ===
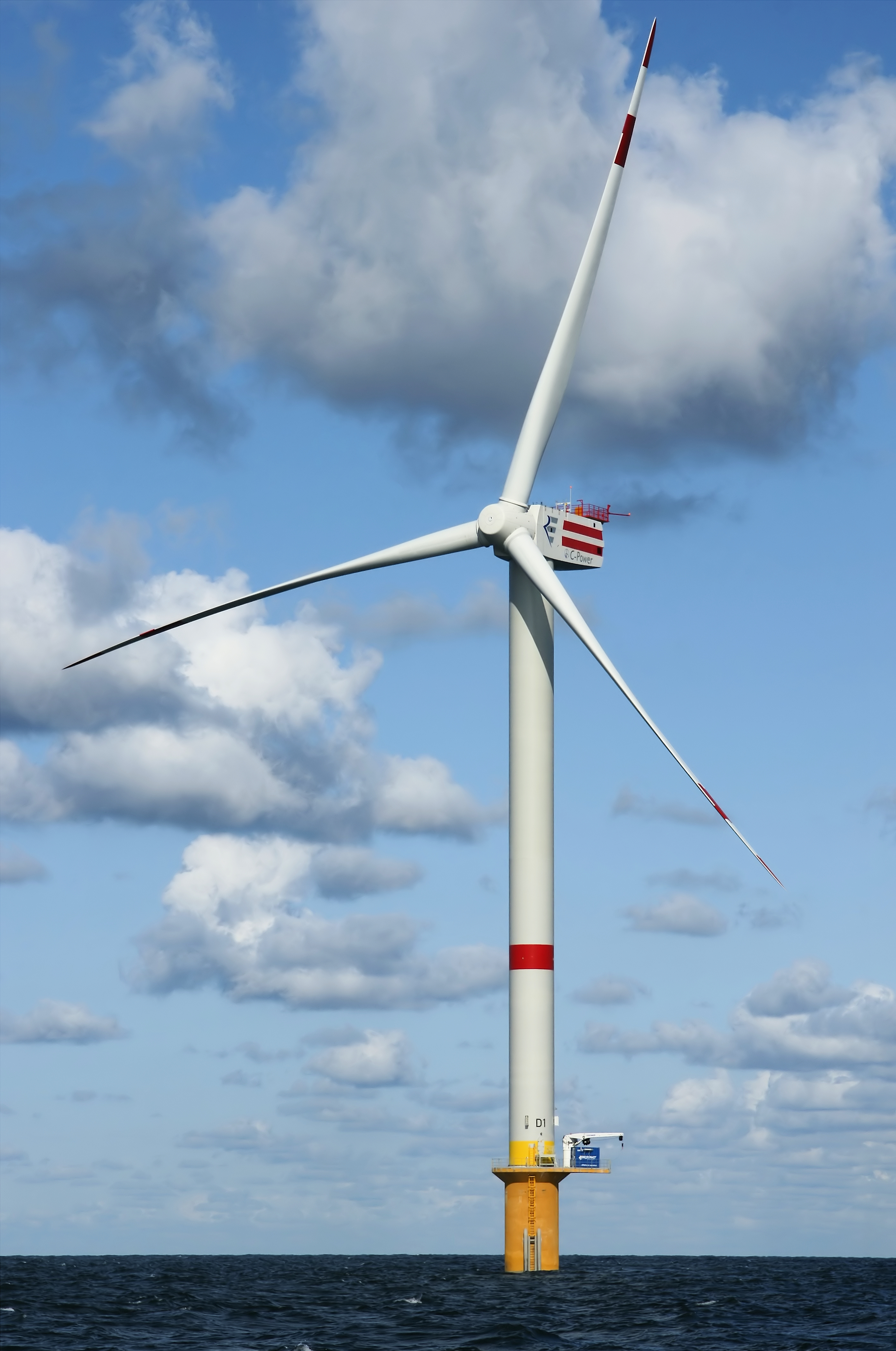
Money generated by carbon offsets from airlines often go to fund green-energy projects such as wind farms.

A carbon offset is a means of compensating aviation emissions by saving enough carbon or absorbing carbon back into plants through photosynthesis (for example, by planting trees through reforestation or afforestation) to balance the carbon emitted by a particular action.

However, carbon credits permanence and additionality can be questionable. More than 90% of rainforest offset credits certified by Verra's Verified Carbon Standard may not represent genuine carbon reductions.

==== Consumer option ====
Some airlines offer carbon offsets to passengers to cover the emissions created by their flight, invested in green technology such as renewable energy and research into future technology. Airlines offering carbon offsets include British Airways, Continental Airlines, easyJet,; and also Air Canada, Air New Zealand, Delta Air Lines, Emirates, Gulf Air, Jetstar, Lufthansa, Qantas, United Airlines and Virgin Australia. Consumers can also purchase offsets on the individual market. There are certification standards for these, including the Gold Standard and the Green-e.

==== National carbon budgets ====
In UK, transportation replaced power generation as the largest emissions source. This includes aviation's 4% contribution. This is expected to expand until 2050 and passenger demand may need to be reduced. For the UK Committee on Climate Change (CCC), the UK target of an 80% reduction from 1990 to 2050 was still achievable from 2019, but the committee suggests that the Paris Agreement should tighten its emission targets. Their position is that emissions in problematic sectors, like aviation, should be offset by greenhouse gas removal, carbon capture and storage and reforestation. The UK will include international aviation and shipping in their carbon budgets and hopes other countries will too.

==== Airline offsets ====
Some airlines have been carbon-neutral like Costa Rican Nature Air, or claim to be, like Canadian Harbour Air Seaplanes. Long-haul low-cost venture Fly POP aims to be carbon neutral.

In 2019, Air France announced it would offset CO_{2} emissions on its 450 daily domestic flights, that carry 57,000 passengers, from January 2020, through certified projects. The company will also offer its customers the option to voluntarily compensate for all their flights and aims to reduce its emissions by 50% per pax/km by 2030, compared to 2005.

Starting in November 2019, UK budget carrier EasyJet decided to offset carbon emissions for all its flights, through investments in atmospheric carbon reduction projects. It claims to be the first major operator to be carbon neutral, at a cost of £25 million for its 2019–2020 financial year. Its CO_{2} emissions were 77 g per passenger in its 2018–2019 financial year, down from 78.4 g the previous year.

From January 2020, British Airways began offsetting its 75 daily domestic flights emissions through carbon-reduction project investments. The airline seeks to become carbon neutral by 2050 with fuel-efficient aircraft, sustainable fuels and operational changes. Passengers flying overseas can offset their flights for £1 to Madrid in economy or £15 to New York in business-class.

US low-cost carrier JetBlue planned to use offsets for its emissions from domestic flights starting in July 2020, the first major US airline to do so. It also plans to use sustainable aviation fuel made from waste by Finnish refiner Neste starting in mid-2020. In August 2020, JetBlue became entirely carbon-neutral for its U.S. domestic flights, using efficiency improvements and carbon offsets. Delta Air Lines pledged to do the same within ten years.

To become carbon neutral by 2050, United Airlines invests to build in the US the largest carbon capture and storage facility through the company 1PointFive, jointly owned by Occidental Petroleum and Rusheen Capital Management, with Carbon Engineering technology, aiming for nearly 10% offsets.

=== Air traffic management improvements ===
Improved Air Traffic Control would allow more direct routes

An improved air traffic management system, with more direct routes than suboptimal air corridors and optimized cruising altitudes, would allow airlines to reduce their emissions by up to 18%. In the European Union, a Single European Sky has been proposed since 1999 to avoid overlapping airspace restrictions between EU countries and to reduce emissions. By 2007, 12 million tons of CO_{2} emissions per year were caused by the lack of a Single European Sky. As of September 2020, the Single European Sky has still not been completely achieved, costing 6 billion euros in delays and causing 11.6 million tonnes of excess CO_{2} emissions.

=== Operations improvements ===
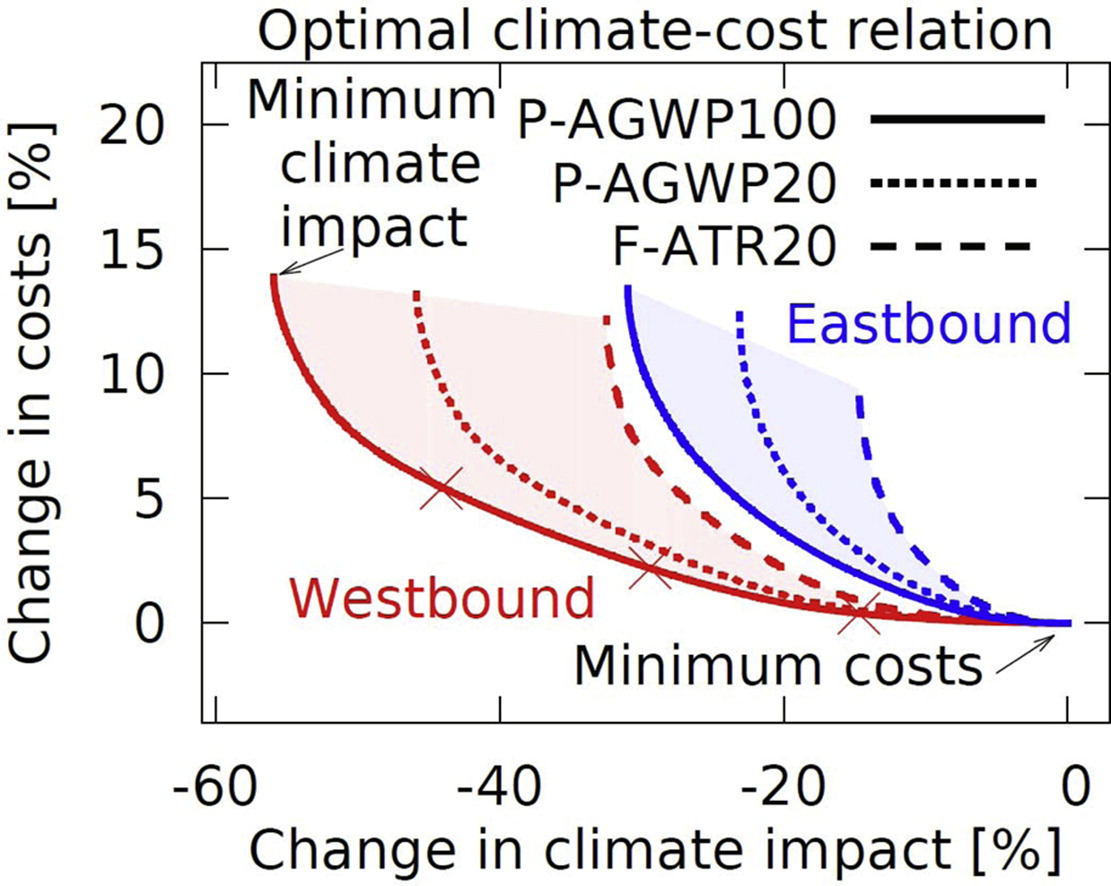
Economic cost and climate influence relation for transatlantic traffic

Non-CO_{2} emissions
Besides carbon dioxide, aviation produces nitrogen oxides (NO_{x}), particulates, unburned hydrocarbons (UHC) and contrails. Flight routes can be optimized: modelling CO_{2}, H_{2}O and NO_{x} effects of transatlantic flights in winter shows westbound flights climate forcing can be lowered by up to 60% and ~25% for jet stream-following eastbound flights, costing 10–15% more due to longer distances and lower altitudes consuming more fuel, but 0.5% costs increase can reduce climate forcing by up to 25%. A 2000 feet (~600 m) lower cruise altitude than the optimal altitude has a 21% lower radiative forcing, while a 2000 feet higher cruise altitude 9% higher radiative forcing.

Nitrogen oxides (NO_{x})
As designers work to reduce NO_{x} emissions from jet engines, they fell by over 40% between 1997 and 2003. Cruising at a 2,000 ft (610 m) lower altitude could reduce NO_{x}-caused radiative forcing from 5 mW/m^{2} to ~3 mW/m^{2}.

Particulates
Modern engines are designed so that no smoke is produced at any point in the flight while particulates and smoke were a problem with early jet engines at high power settings.

Unburned hydrocarbons (UHC)
Produced by incomplete combustion, more unburned hydrocarbons are produced with low compressor pressures and/or relatively low combustor temperatures, they have been eliminated in modern jet engines through improved design and technology, like particulates.

Contrails
Contrail formation would be reduced by lowering the cruise altitude with slightly increased flight times, but this would be limited by airspace capacity, especially in Europe and North America, and increased fuel burn due to lower efficiency at lower altitudes, increasing CO_{2} emissions by 4%. Contrail radiative forcing could be minimized by schedules: night flights cause 60–80% of the forcing for only 25% of the air traffic, while winter flights contribute half of the forcing for only 22% of the air traffic. As 2% of flights are responsible for 80% of contrail radiative forcing, changing a flight altitude by 2,000 ft (610 m) to avoid high humidity for 1.7% of flights would reduce contrail formation by 59%. DLR's ECLIF3 study, flying an Airbus A350, show sustainable aviation fuel reduces contrail ice-crystal formation by 56% and soot particle by 35%, maybe due to lower sulphur content, as well as low aromatic and naphthalene content.

== See also ==
- Aviation Environment Federation, UK concerned organization
- Construction of solar photovoltaic arrays on airport roofs to offset their electricity use
- Business jet
- Energy efficiency in transport
- European Green Deal
- Environmental effects of aviation in the United Kingdom
- Environmental effects of transport
- Flying Matters, UK former pro-aviation coalition
- Health hazards of air travel
- Individual action on climate change
- Plane Mad, Irish concerned action group
