= Berlin's Environmental Zone =

Berlin’s Environmental Zone, also known as Berlin’s Umweltzone, refers to a region within the city of Berlin and has been deemed a low-emissions zone. This zone permits only vehicles that have an environmental badge, or a green sticker, to enter. The policy was put into place in January 2008 due to the high density of Berlin’s inner city being affected by pollutants such as fine dust (PM 10) and nitrogen dioxide (NO_{2}) threatening human health.

== Definition ==
The pollution from vehicles highly affects human health in Berlin and surrounding areas, as well as a very high contribution to greenhouse gas emissions and the effect that has on the rest of the planet. It was brought to the forefront in 2002 that Berlin was not falling within the emission limits of these toxins that were set out by the World Health Organization for Europe and Copenhagen. Part of the Berlin Governments’ additional measures to mitigate this issue, was the Environmental Zone. The Environmental Zone is part of Berlin’s Air Quality Plan to reduce the emissions from vehicles focusing specifically on particulate matter (PM 10) and nitrogen dioxide (NO_{2}). Sixteen monitoring stations where set up in the city to record pollution concentrations in an effort to eventually narrow it down to a specific area of the city that required the most focus. The area decided upon comprises eighty-eight square kilometres that contains an estimated one million residence. It is regulated based on vehicles compliance or non-compliance of standard pollution levels, which will allow them to gain access to the Environmental Zone if they fall within the restrictions.

== Types ==
This system is controlled through what is called ‘environment bandage classification’ which categorizes cars based on the emissions they release. To attain an environmental badge, your vehicle must meet certain exhaust standards. There are four pollutant classes for diesel, and two for petrol, all based on the European emission standards set by The World Health Organization for Europe and Copenhagen. There are 6 stages ranging from Euro 1, which was released in 1993, to Euro 6, which was released in 2014, each one becoming more stringent each year.

=== Petrol ===
For petrol engine vehicles, there are two classifications simply meaning that a vehicle either does meet the European standard, or it does not. To meet the Euro standard, they require a closed-loop catalytic converter. This is a complex technology for emission control that converts harmful toxins that are emitted from cars such as NO_{2} and carbon monoxide (CO), into less hazardous by-products including carbon dioxide and water vapour.

=== Diesel ===
For diesel engine passenger vehicles, there are four different stickers that can be attained. Each sticker is based on the level of Euro standard that every vehicle within the environmental zone must meet. To reach these standards, vehicles must have a diesel particulate filter retrofit that traps PH10 particles in its filter lowering the emission of that vehicle.

=== Exemptions ===
There are certain exemptions for this law. One is a vintage car, for all vehicles that are at least 30 years of age. These vehicles must be registered to attain a historic registration number or a red vintage car registration number plate. In addition, there are exemptions for commercial vehicles that fall within three categorizes. The first is special vehicles where there is no retrofitting solution, the second is fleet vehicles for companies with an abundance of vehicles with the idea of retrofitting threatening the company’s survival, and the third is cases of hardship. These exemptions are put into place to avoid putting people into situations of distress where they may no long be able to maintain their occupation and therefore not obtain the same level of income.

== Scientific understanding ==
=== Humans ===
Berlin's regulation encompassing the Environmental Zone focuses on reducing PM 10 and NO_{2} particles that are commonly produced from the fossil fuels in the oil in vehicles. PM10 consists of organic and inorganic particles that are found suspended within air particles and have health damaging effects as it acts as a trigger for cardiovascular and respiratory disease in humans. NO_{2}, while also found in air, have scientifically been shown to cause bronchitis as well as reduce lung function growth in children

People who choose not to use a public or natural form of transportation such as walking or biking, are required to have a sticker on their vehicle. This sticker shows what type of pollutant your vehicle is in order to be used in the environmental zone. If the driver or passenger does not obey to have this sticker on their vehicle within any environmental zones in Germany they have to pay a fine.

=== Earth ===
In addition to the grave effects on human health, these toxins also affect our planet. These harmful substances have been directly linked to the Earths overall increase in temperature over recent decade’s, which is also referred to as climate change, or global warming. The emissions that vehicles release are known as fossil fuels that produce greenhouse gases. These gases build up in the atmosphere and act as a blanket preventing the energy from the sun to reflect back into space. Instead, this energy is getting trapped within our atmosphere increasing the overall temperature of the planet. This may seem like an insignificant issue, but these small increases continuously offset the natural balance of Earth. For example, as Tzamkiozis, Ntziachristos, and Samaras wrote about in their article in ‘The Atmospheric Environment’, PM10 is known to be an absorbing aerosol. This means that it warms air offsetting atmospheric stability and leading to larger fluctuations in the hydraulic cycle resulting in unnatural climate effects. Even the smallest increases in temperature intensify natural disasters such as floods, earthquakes, or hurricanes. Furthermore, these increasing temperatures have consequential effects on sea levels as the warmer temperatures have been directly correlated with the increased melting of the polar ice caps as well as expansion of seawater from higher temperatures, thus generating an influx of environmental migrants.

== Progress ==
In an environmental impact statement written up by Martin Lutz of the Senate Department for Health, Environment and Consumer Protection in 2009, studies found that vehicles registered with high emissions that has been prohibited from the environmental zone had decreased.
