= AirportWatch =

British environmental group

AirportWatch is an environmental group which campaigns for sustainable air transport through reduction or redistribution of demand, determined by either timing or location (Demand Management approach).

== History ==
AirportWatch was formed in 2000.

In the run-up to the 2007 Camp for Climate Action near Heathrow Airport, BAA sought an injunction, banning members of groups supporting AirportWatch, such as the National Trust and Greenpeace, from attending the protest. The airport operator won a reduced injunction naming senior members of AirportWatch and Plane Stupid, but not including AirportWatch or its members.

AirportWatch is a member of the Stop Climate Chaos Coalition.

== Campaign Issues ==
These campaign issues have been identified by AirportWatch:

- Climate change effect of the carbon dioxide emissions
- Noise complaints by local communities near airports
- Environmental impact near airports
- Growth in low-cost holiday flights affecting the UK economy
- Possible environmental effects from aviation
- Effectiveness of carbon offsetting in removing CO_{2} from the atmosphere

== See also ==
- Air transport and the environment (United Kingdom)
- Carbon offsetting
- Climate Change
- Environmental direct action in the United Kingdom
- Flying Matters – a pro-aviation expansion commercial coalition
- Heathrow Airport
- Stop Stansted Expansion
