= Aviation Environment Federation =

Trade association in the UK

The Aviation Environment Federation (AEF) is the principal UK non-profit making organisation concerned with the environmental effects of aviation. These range from aviation noise issues associated with small airstrips or helipads to the contribution of airline emissions to global warming and climate change. Whilst essentially an anti-aviation pressure group, AEF is nonetheless widely quoted in international media as a source of research and analysis on issues related to aviation and the environment.

The AEF was established in 1975 and its members include, to an extent, community and environmental groups, local authorities, parish assemblies, and individuals.

AEF is a member of AirportWatch, a UK-wide network of conservation and residents' groups, Transport and Environment, which campaigns for smarter, greener transport in Europe, and the International Coalition for Sustainable Aviation.

== See also ==
- AirportWatch
- Aviation noise
- Climate Change
- Environmental impact of aviation
- Global warming
- Hypermobility (transport)
- Natural environment
- List of airports in the United Kingdom
