= British Air Transport Association =

Trade association in the UK

Airlines UK is the trade association for registered airlines in the United Kingdom.

== History ==
In November 2016, the British Air Transport Association became Airlines UK.
