= Transportation demand management =

Policies to reduce transportation demands

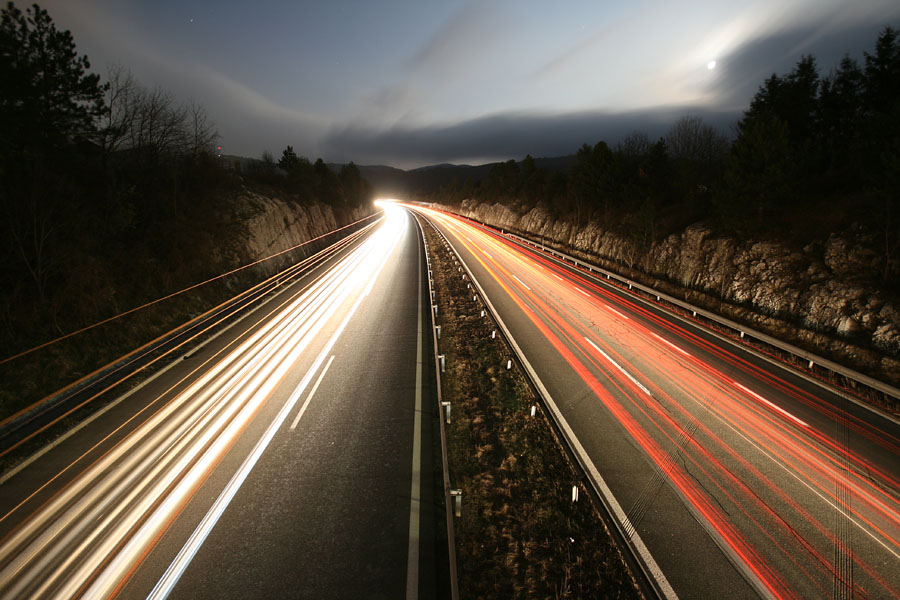
Evening traffic on the A1 freeway in Slovenia

Transportation demand management or travel demand management (TDM) is the application of strategies and policies to increase the efficiency of transportation systems, that reduce travel demand, or to redistribute this demand in space or in time.

In transport, as in any network, managing demand can be a cost-effective alternative to increasing capacity. A demand management approach to transport also has the potential to deliver better environmental outcomes, improved public health, stronger communities, and more prosperous cities. TDM techniques link with and support community movements for sustainable transport.

The Association for Commuter Transportation defines TDM as the use of strategies to inform and encourage travelers to maximize the efficiency of a transportation system leading to improved mobility, reduced congestion, and lower vehicle emissions.

== Background ==
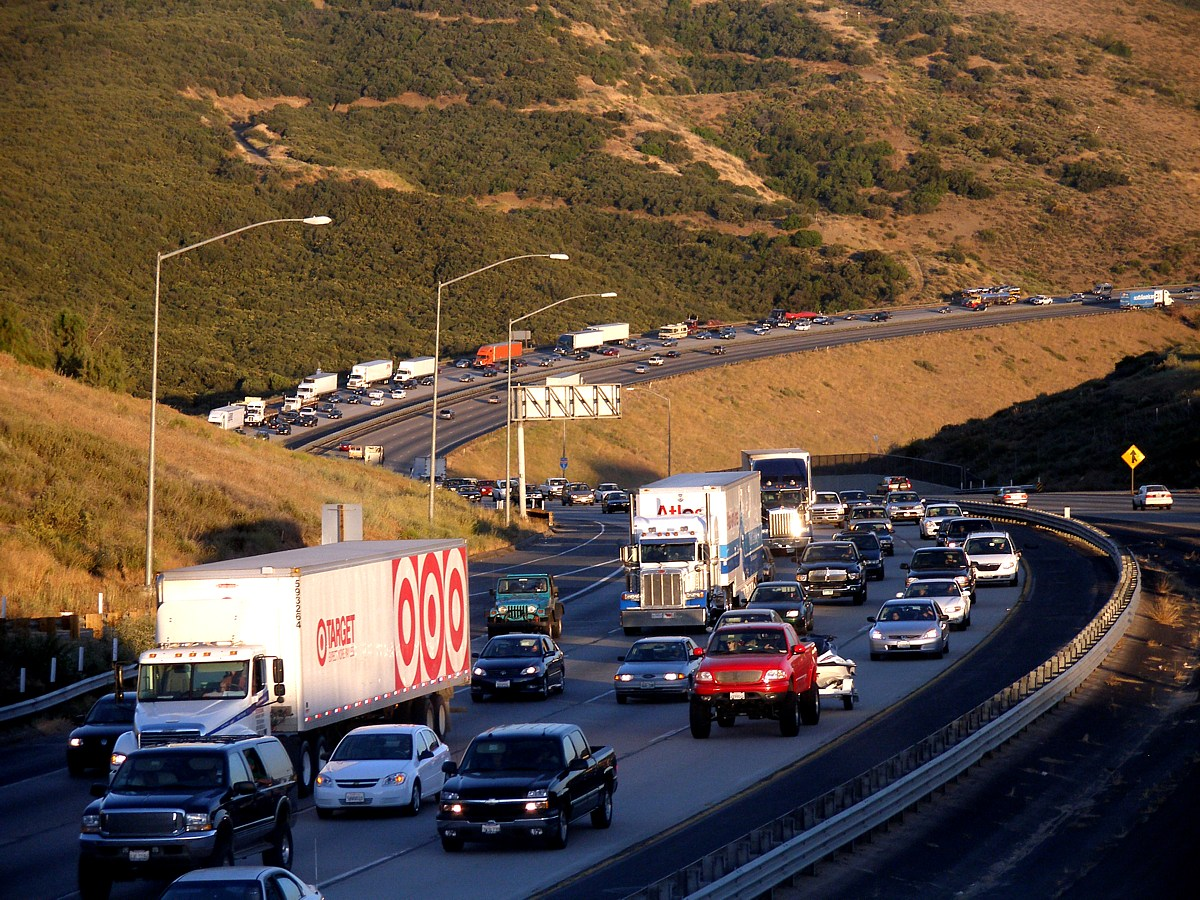
Traffic congestion on Interstate 5, at Los Angeles, California

The term "TDM" has its origins in the United States in the 1970s and 1980s, and is linked to the economic impacts of the sharp increase in oil prices during the 1973 oil crisis and the 1979 energy crisis. When long lines appeared at gas stations, it became self-evident that alternatives to single-occupancy commuter travel needed to be provided in order to save energy, improve air quality, and reduce peak period congestion.

The concepts of TDM borrowed from mainstream transport planning in Europe, which had never been based on assumptions that the private car was the best or only solution for urban mobility. For example, the Dutch Transport Structure Scheme has since the 1970s required that demand for additional vehicle capacity be met only "if the contribution to societal welfare is positive" and since 1990 has included an explicit target to halve the rate of growth in vehicle traffic.

Some cities outside Europe have also consistently taken a demand management approach to transport and land use planning, notably Curitiba, Brazil; Portland, Oregon, US; Arlington, Virginia, US; and Vancouver, Canada.

Oil price trend, 1861–2007, both nominal and adjusted to inflation

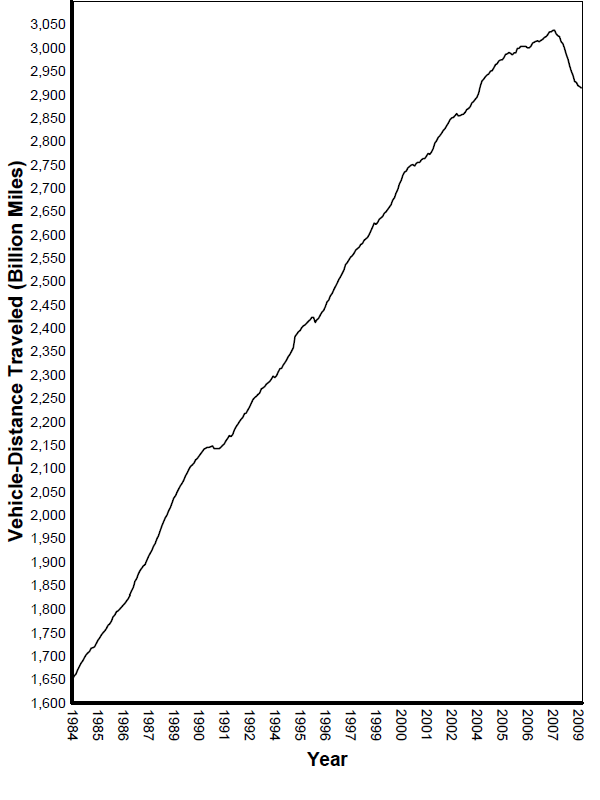
Vehicle miles travelled in the United States to March 2009

Relatively low and stable oil prices during the 1980s and 1990s led to significant increases in vehicle travel, both directly because people chose to travel by car more often and for greater distances, and indirectly because cities developed tracts of suburban housing, distant from shops and from workplaces, now referred to as urban sprawl. Trends in freight logistics, including a movement from rail and coastal shipping to road freight and a requirement for just in time deliveries, meant that freight traffic grew faster than general vehicle traffic.

Because vehicle travel was increasing rapidly from 1980 to 2000, it follows that (with a few exceptions) the techniques of demand management were not widely or successfully applied during this period. Small-scale projects to provide alternatives to single occupant commuter travel were common, but generally were led from outside the mainstream of transport planning. However many of the techniques in the demand management toolbox were developed during this period.

The British Government's White Paper on Transport marked a change in direction. In the introduction to the White Paper, Prime Minister Tony Blair stated that

We recognise that we cannot simply build our way out of the problems we face. It would be environmentally irresponsible - and would not work.

A companion document to the White Paper called "Smarter Choices" researched the potential to scale up the small and scattered sustainable transport initiatives then occurring across Britain, and concluded that the comprehensive application of these techniques could reduce peak period car travel in urban areas by over 20%.

A similar study by the United States Federal Highway Administration, was also released in 2004 and also concluded that a more proactive approach to transportation demand was an important component of overall national transport strategy.

In 2023, the Biden-Harris Administration released the U.S. National Blueprint for Transportation Decarbonization. Developed by the Departments of Energy, Transportation, Housing and Urban Development, and the Environmental Protection Agency, the Blueprint is a landmark strategy for cutting all greenhouse emissions from the transportation sector by 2050.

The Blueprint recommends the use of Transportation Demand Management (TDM) strategies, policies, and regulations to increase the efficiency of our transportation systems. The Blueprint states, "it is essential to implement design solutions that increase convenience, provide better access to clean modes of travel, and support demand management policies that make it easier and more convenient to choose more efficient travel options".

== Terminology ==
Since 2010 transportation professionals have suggested that the term "transportation demand management" is widely misunderstood simply as a collection of vaguely related initiatives, and that this misunderstanding is constraining the true potential of the concept. TDM practitioners have found that TDM is far more effective when framed as a philosophical approach which over time becomes a cornerstone of sustainable urban transport systems. A new paradigm in transport planning, internationally recognised as TDM, appears to be emerging which embraces concepts such as "mobility management" and "active travel management" under its umbrella.

Crucial to the delivery of a sustainable urban transport system is integrating the TDM philosophy into urban transport planning, as well as the daily management and operation of transport services and infrastructure. It appears that managing travel demand has largely been compartmentalized as a set of “soft measures” to promote sustainable travel options or programs to promote and offer shared ride arrangements. Demand management means different things to different disciplines. For example: to Information Technology (IT) specialists, managing demand is new technology to provide information; to operations managers, managing demand is controlling the flow onto highways; to economists, it is pricing the system to find equilibrium with capacity; to marketers, it is promoting innovative campaigns; and to many policymakers TDM remains a largely unknown entity.

The concept has become confused as each discipline has tried to mold the concept to their set of tools. This “silo” thinking inhibits the kind of policy integration that is needed to develop a sustainable urban transport solution strategy. There remains much confusion as to what a sustainable transport system would comprise. It is helpful therefore to consider different approaches to sustainable transport along a spectrum of viewpoints, ranging from weak to strong sustainability. Efforts to address the impact of transport on climate change have, to date, generally been focused on technology. The impact of this technology-led approach has been very limited in the transport sector. TDM has the potential to move the transport sector from a position of weak to strong sustainability by combining behavior-change with technology improvements.

In this context transport demand management is understood as a much broader concept. Implicit in the use of the term is the assumption that it is accompanied by the implementation of sustainable mobility, introduction of full cost pricing and organizational or structural measures to ensure a broad range of complementary interventions work effectively together to realize the benefits of sustainable transport. It is the unifying philosophy of TDM, not specific measures associated with it, that underpin the policy objective of a more sustainable system of transport. This philosophy of managing demand accepts that meeting unfettered demand for travel is impractical and that therefore the system needs to be managed. That demand for travel needs to be managed by:

- Expanding the supply and availability of (more sustainable) alternatives;
- Controlling demand for the use unsustainable modes;
- Providing incentives and rewards for undertaking sustainable travel habits; and
- Imposing full-cost pricing on the use of the automobile.

== Rationale for managing travel demand ==
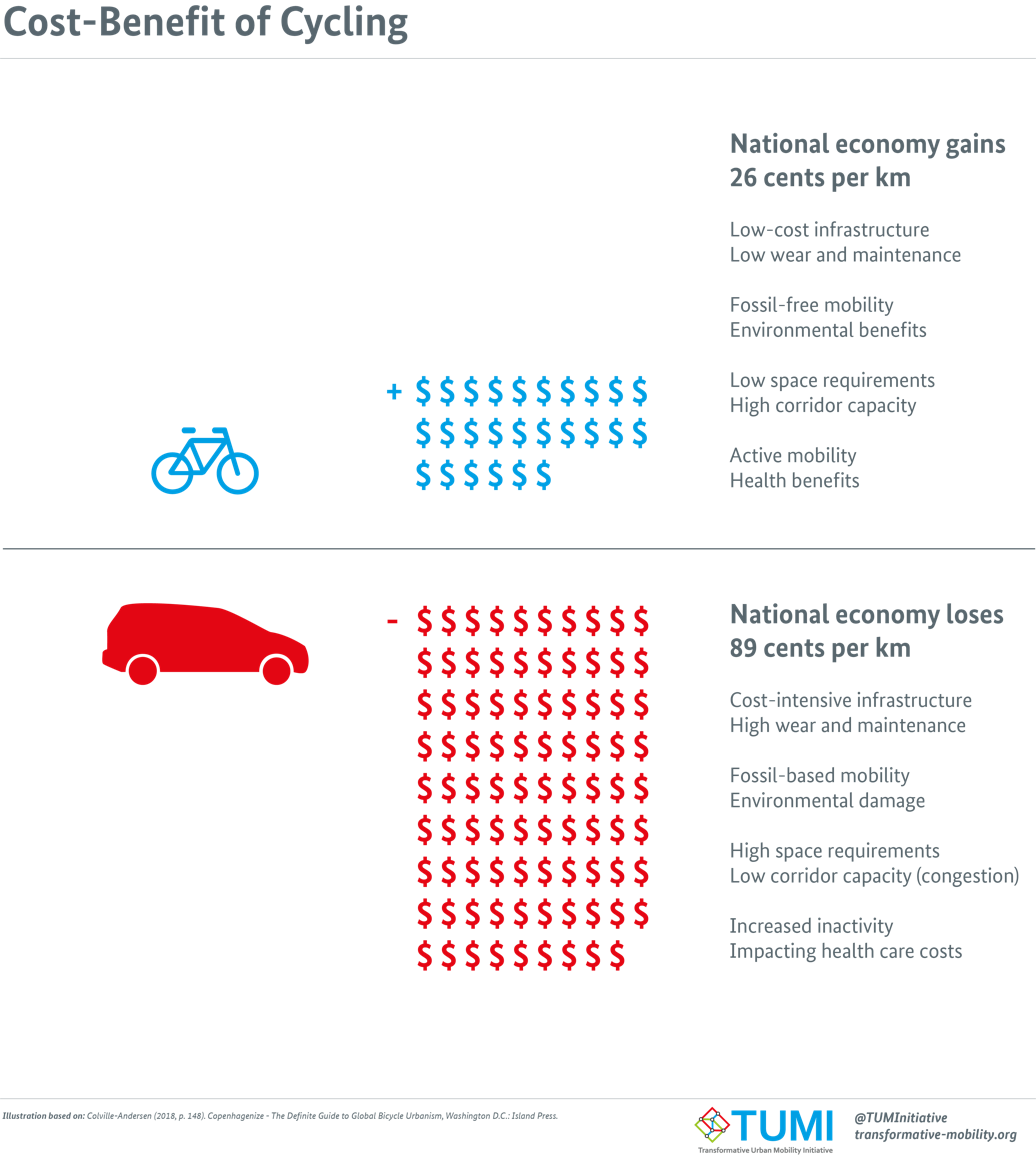

The need to manage travel demand has now become urgent for a number of converging reasons.

Oil prices have now passed the previous peak in 1980, and 95% of all energy used in transport is oil. Vehicle travel in the United States, which has been rising steadily since records began, started to level out before the fuel price increases and is now in decline. Part of this decline is likely to be people making fewer trips, with potentially far-reaching economic and social consequences. Countries and cities where the car is one of many travel choices are more likely to prosper, as people can choose to drive less but are still able to travel by transit, cycle safely, walk to local shops and facilities, or choose to work or study from home.

Transport systems are responsible for 23% of energy-related greenhouse gas emissions, and are increasing at a faster rate than any other energy using sector. Demand management is central to the effort to reduce greenhouse gas emissions from urban transportation,

Increases in vehicle travel are linked to a range of health problems including poor urban air quality, road injuries and fatalities, and reduced physical activity. The World Health Organization stated in 2003:

We are concerned that current patterns of transport, which are dominated by motorised road transport, have substantial adverse impacts on health.

The efficacy of adding roadway capacity to manage traffic congestion is being increasingly challenged. Much of the traffic on new or expanded roads has been shown to be induced.

A growing sustainable transport movement is mobilising public demand for investment in safer, more livable cities with a greater range of travel choices.

=== Aviation ===
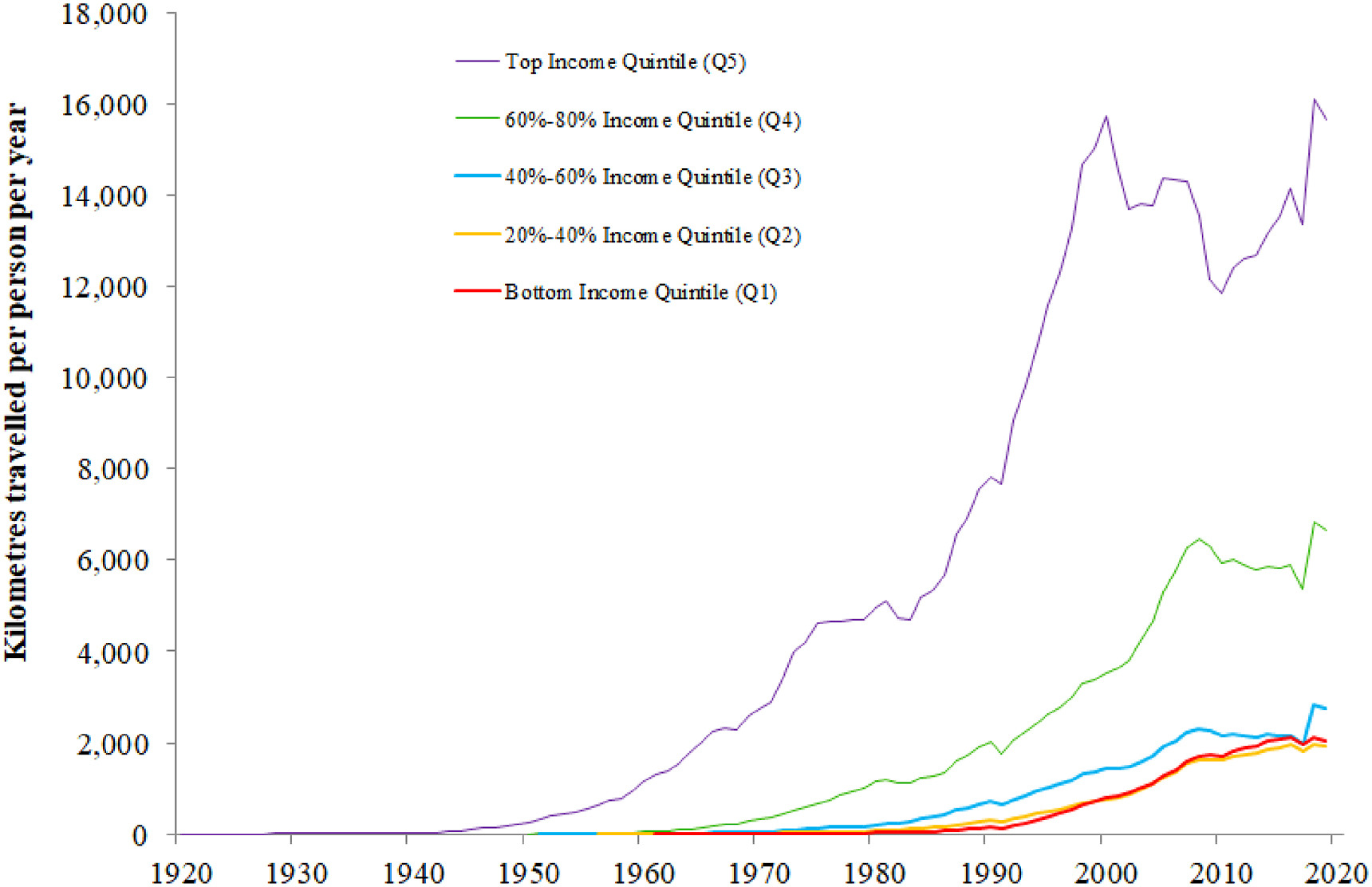
UK air travel by income quintile through time

Air travel demand mitigation or aviation demand reduction or air travel demand reduction is a part of transportation demand management and climate change mitigation.

Inhibition of a large or general growth in demand or reduction of demand and need for flights is considered an important part of climate change mitigation as air travel has a substantial impact on the climate. Changes in "behavioral travel parameters can significantly impact the projections for travel demand and the associated energy use and CO_{2} emissions".

== Demand management toolbox ==
There is a broad range of TDM measures, including:

- Transportation management associations: leverage public and private funds to increase the use of ridesharing and other commuting options that reduce traffic congestion and improve air quality
- Including or improving pedestrian-oriented design elements, such as short pedestrian crossings, wide sidewalks and street trees.
- Requiring users of parking to pay the costs directly, as opposed to sharing the costs indirectly with others through increased rents and tax subsidies.
- Including and improving public transportation infrastructure, such as subway entrances, bus stops and routes.
- Subsidizing transit costs for employees or residents.
- Bicycle-friendly facilities and environments, including secure bike storage areas and showers. See Bicycle transportation engineering
- Providing active transportation (AT) facilities including bike lanes and multi-use trails.
- Providing traveler information tools, including intelligent transportation system improvements, mobile and social applications, wayfinding tools, and other methods for promoting alternatives to single occupancy vehicle (SOV) modes
- Flex-time work schedules with employers to reduce congestion at peak times
- Active traffic management
- Congestion pricing during peak hours.
- Road space rationing or alternate-day travel by restricting travel based on license plate number, at certain times and places.
- Workplace travel plans
- Roadspace reallocation, aiming to re-balance provision between private cars which often predominate due to high spatial allocations for roadside parking, and for sustainable modes.
- Time, distance and place (TDP) road pricing, where road users are charged based on when, where and how much they drive. Some transportation experts believe TDP pricing is an integral part of the next generation in transportation demand management.

== See also ==
- Automobile dependency
- Bus lane
- Change management
- Congestion pricing
- Discrete choice
- GNSS road pricing
- Green transport hierarchy
- Hierarchy of roads
- High-occupancy vehicle lane
- Hypermobility
- Modal share
- Mode choice
- Park and ride
- Pedestrian zone
- Remote work
- Shared space
- Street hierarchy
- Traffic calming
- Travel behavior
- Travel survey
- Urban planning
- Urban sprawl
- Woonerf
