= Flight shame =

Social movement that discourages airline flying

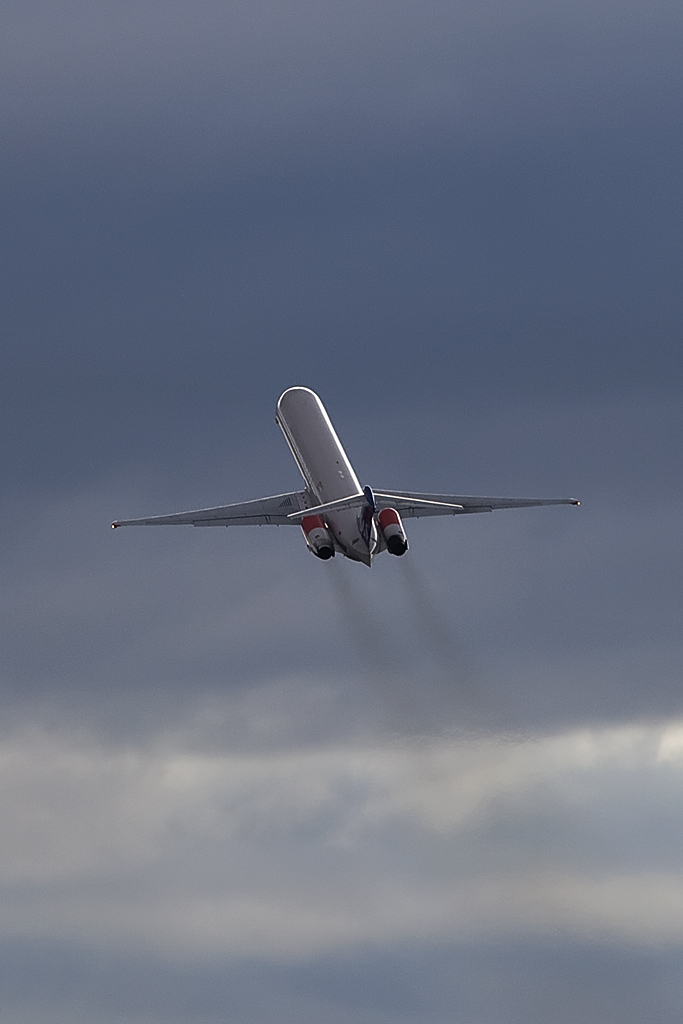
A McDonnell Douglas MD-80 of Scandinavian Airlines leaving a trail of smoke as it climbs, thus adding to carbon emissions from air travel.

Flight shame or flygskam (Swedish) is a social movement that discourages air travel due to its environmental impact, including outsized carbon emissions linked to anthropogenic climate change. Originating in Sweden, the term was popularised by climate activist Greta Thunberg, with the movement alternatively known as an anti-flying or anti-flight movement.

Flight shame refers to an individual's uneasiness over engaging in consumption that is energy-intense with consequences for the climate and environment. It also reflects on air travelers as people involved in socially undesirable activities, and adaptive behaviour as described in the related Swedish term smygflyga (i.e. sneak-flying).

The movement took off in 2018 in Sweden and gained traction the following year throughout northern Europe. Flygskam is a Swedish word that literally means "flight shame".

== Origins ==
Staffan Lindberg, a Swedish singer, was reported to have coined the term in 2017. Björn Ferry, an Olympic athlete, was also one of the first notable champions of the concept. Malena Ernman, an opera singer and the mother of teenage activist Greta Thunberg, also announced publicly that she would stop flying. Thunberg helped popularise the movement. The idea would continue to grow as other Swedish celebrities followed suit. Maja Rosén in 2018 started the We Stay on the Ground movement in Sweden. The group pledges to give up flying for a year once 100,000 people in a given country commit to do the same. The word started to become mainstream among English speakers in 2019.

== Tågskryt ==
Tågskryt, a Swedish word that literally means "train brag", has resulted from the flygskam movement. This idea encourages people to travel by train rather than by airliner. Furthermore, it encourages people to utilise social media by posting pictures from their train trip and tagging it #tågskryt.

Att smygflyga, which means "to fly in secret", is also another term that has been derived from the flygskam movement.

== Impact ==
About 2.5 percent of global human carbon emissions come from commercial flights. Additionally, planes emit other gases such as nitrogen oxide and water vapour as contrails that also have an environmental impact. When the flight shame movement started, the volume of flights was projected to expand, although the aviation industry was taking steps to decrease their emissions.

=== Individual decisions ===
While reducing aviation emissions on a global scale requires policy changes because they reflect regulatory and business failures to address the climate crisis, individuals have supported this idea by reducing the carbon footprint of their travel and serving as influencers, voters, and social movement participants to pressure governments and businesses into action.

In Sweden, train ridership has increased, while domestic flying has decreased. SJ, Sweden's main railway operator, reported that it sold 1.5 million more tickets in 2018 than the year prior. According to Swedavia, Sweden's airport operators, domestic travel decreased 9% from the previous year. Passenger numbers at Sweden's ten busiest airports decreased 5% in the summer of 2019, compared to the year prior.

The same pattern was seen in Germany. Deutsche Bahn AG railway service reported a record high number of travellers in 2019. German airports showed a decrease in passengers taking domestic flights, down 12% from November 2019, compared to the year prior.

In a 2019 survey of 6,000 people by the Swiss bank UBS, 21% of respondents in the United States, France, England and Germany said they flew less in the past year.

This pattern has so far not been observed in the Netherlands. A 2019 survey by NBTC-Nipo Research showed that almost 60% of Dutch people (a percentage that has barely changed in 10 years) stated they found it important to factor in sustainability when planning a holiday, but 5% more planned to fly to their destination in the future than in 2019. A 2020 survey by NBTC-Nipo Research showed the situation had further exacerbated: out of a total of 39.9 million holidays, the Dutch made 10.1 million holiday flights (a 3% increase) and 10 million holiday car trips in 2019 (a 3% decrease), meaning flying holidays outnumbered driving holidays for the first time in Dutch history.

Similarly, flight shame has not been a factor in Belgium either, where a new record of 35 million passengers departed or arrived by plane in 2019. However, it is not clear whether this implied an increase in pollution. For example, Brussels Airport reported a 0.5% decrease in the number of flights, despite a 2.5% increase in passengers, suggesting many of the planes were simply flying more full, than in 2018.

Some U.S. airline executives were concerned that flight shame popularised by Greta Thunberg could play a role as global air travel growth slowed to 4% in 2019, down from an average of 5% per year over the previous decade.

Flight shame tends to occur mostly when surrounded by others who feel strongly about the ecological impacts that flying has. It is then dependent on one's social environment and how obligated one feels to justify their decisions to those who feel morally obligated to follow what others are doing. If the goal is to avoid judgment, then the number of those who enact flight shame will appear more passionate about the topic. Similarly, flight shame occurs most often on vacation travel than other types of travel.

=== Short-haul flight bans ===
By 2019, the flight shame movement had inspired dozens of organisations, including universities and businesses such as Klarna Bank AB, across Europe to impose short-haul flight bans on their employees, as well as discouraging long-haul flights. In May of 2023, the government of France completely outlawed short-haul, domestic flights serving routes which are both within a 2.5-hour radius and can alternatively be served by SNCF's high speed rail service. However, the effect was abysmally minimal for the reason that as of 2023, it only affected three specific routes from Paris's Orly Airport to the cities of Bordeaux, Nantes, and Lyon.

=== Industry response ===
The airline industry has recognised the movement as a threat to its business interests. In 2019, at the annual International Air Transport Association (IATA) in Seoul, combating flygskam was discussed. Some airlines, such as easyJet, stated they would spend tens of millions of British Pounds to buy carbon offsets. In September 2024, Sweden's centre-right government announced it would abolish its aviation tax from July 2025, with Infrastructure Minister Andreas Carlson stating "there are few reasons to feel flight shame".

=== COVID-19 pandemic ===
By April 2020, the COVID-19 pandemic had caused global air travel numbers to plummet, as airlines cut up to 95% of their trips, dwarfing the impact of the flygskam movement. Prithwiraj Choudhury of the Harvard Business School and Jillian Anable of the University of Leeds consider that many aviation crisis adaptions made during the pandemic could lead to lasting behavioural changes after it ends, and that flying could be unlikely to return to pre-pandemic levels, in order to address climate change.

== Public debate ==
Individual carbon footprint reductions for various actions

The 2009 German short video The Bill, created by Germanwatch, explores how travel and its impacts are commonly viewed in everyday developed-world life, and the social pressures that are at play.

British writer George Marshall has investigated common rationalisations that act as barriers to making the personal choice to travel less, or to justify recent trips. In an informal research project, "one you are welcome to join", he says, he deliberately steered conversations with people who are attuned to climate change problems towards questions about their recent long-distance flights and why their travel was justified. Reflecting on actions contrary to their beliefs, he noted, "(i)ntriguing as their dissonance may be, what is especially revealing is that every one of these people has a career that is predicated on the assumption that information is sufficient to generate change – an assumption that a moment's introspection would show them was deeply flawed."

In a blog post, Alexandre de Juniac, then-director general and CEO of the airline trade association IATA, said that "Flying is freedom" and "Confining people's horizons to train distances or boat speeds back-steps on a century of worldwide progress. Relying on virtual meetings to make global connections ignores the feelings and sensations that make us human."

Research professor Brené Brown has argued that flight guilt is more productive than flight shame: "Shame is a focus on self, guilt is a focus on behavior. Shame is, 'I am bad.' Guilt is, 'I did something bad.'"

In 2011, S. Cohen observed both air travel and concern over its climate impacts were growing, balanced by technology and physical resources, self and external regulation and social norms including stigmatisation of excessive air travel. In 2009, Stefan Gössling pointed out the conflict caused by air travel growth in a carbon-constrained world, with a minority of hypermobile individuals responsible for a large share of air travel.

In 2018, 11% of the global population took a flight, 4% flew abroad and 1% was responsible for half of global aviation emissions, according to a November 2020 study from Linnaeus University.

In 2021, Evelien van Leeuwen published an article about flight shaming which examined the motivations and the decision-making process of airline passengers who decided to offset their carbon emissions through KLM's CO2ZERO program. This program enabled passengers to offset their flight's carbon emissions by investing in sustainable energy projects. The research found that while most respondents were motivated by environmental concerns, cost and convenience were also important factors in their decision-making process. The study concludes that while voluntary carbon offsetting can contribute to mitigating the environmental impact of air travel, it is not a sufficient solution to address the climate crisis.

=== Surveys ===
In autumn 2014, a German survey showed that Green Party voters travel more often by plane: 49% flew once a year compared to 42% of Left voters, 36% of CDU/CSU (Conservatives) supporters and 32% of SPD (Labour) supporters. None of them had never flown, compared to 17%, 16% and 13% for the other supporters, respectively. Only 48% of the Green voters agreed with the statement "It's a good thing that many people can afford to fly today" while 69% to 77% of the other parties agreed. Greens supporters are often well educated and earn more than the average, and travel frequently for business and tourism. In Britain in 2015, a survey carried out by Travelzoo showed that Green Party supporters are the most likely to fly long-haul.

In February 2020, a French opinion survey conducted by Paul Chiambaretto, et al., of the Montpellier Business School showed that 90% of people overestimate the air transport share of CO_{2} emissions, more than half think it is over 10% instead of the actual figure of 2–3%. 90% of people think the emissions per passenger have been stable or grew, while they actually reduced by 25% within the last 15 years and 70% overestimate modern aircraft fuel consumption (within 2–3 L/100 km per passenger) with 24% thinking they burn over 10 L/100 km per passenger. Of the 37% of French people who avoided air travel in 2019, 15% of them (5.6% overall) preferred other transport means for environmental reasons. After the COVID-19 pandemic, 61% of people said that they intend to travel by air in 2021, more hindered by the travel restrictions than environmental concerns. The environment is a concern for those who avoided air travel before, around 20% of the surveyed population.

In early 2022, the European Investment Bank published the results of its 2021–2022 Climate Survey, showing that 52% of Europeans under 30, 37% of people between 30 and 64 and 25% for people aged 65 and above plan to travel by air for their summer holidays in 2022; and 27% of those under 30, 17% for people aged 30–64 and 12% for people aged 65 and above plan to travel by air to a faraway destination.

== See also ==
- Air travel demand reduction
