= Air travel demand reduction =

Climate change mitigation method

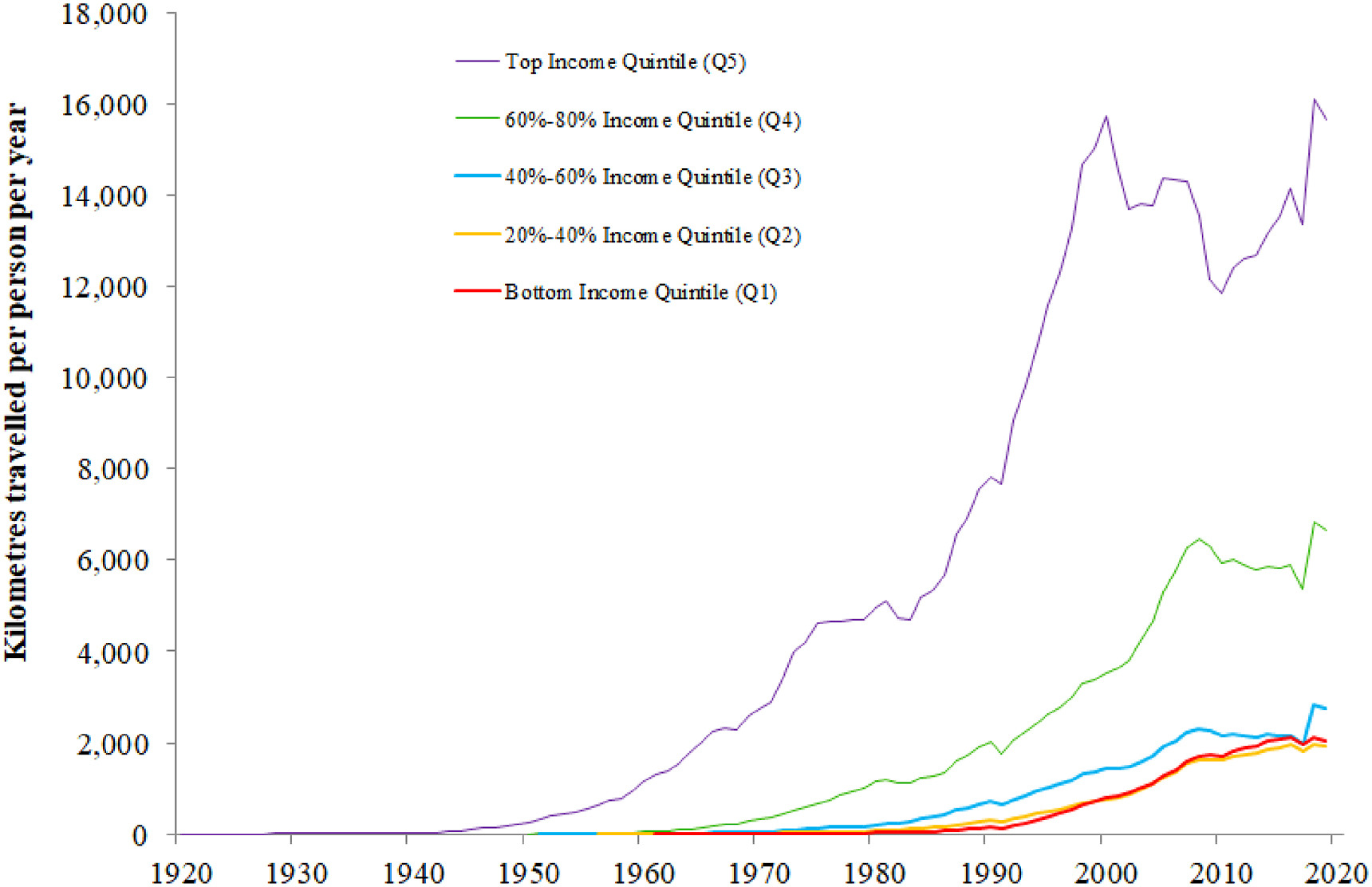
UK air travel by income quintile through time

Air travel demand mitigation or aviation demand reduction or air travel demand reduction is a part of transportation demand management and climate change mitigation.

Inhibition of a large or general growth in demand or reduction of demand and need for flights is considered an important part of climate change mitigation as air travel has a substantial impact on the climate. Changes in "behavioral travel parameters can significantly impact the projections for travel demand and the associated energy use and CO_{2} emissions".

== Significance to global air travel emissions reduction ==
Aviation is one of three sectors identified in a study where "demand-side options" can have a large effect in "reaching SDS levels". According to a study, the attainment of the 1.5–2 °C global temperature goal necessitates substantial demand reductions in the critical sectors of aviation, shipping, road freight, and industry, should large-scale negative emissions not be realized. According to the IMAGE model used to project scenarios aimed at limiting global temperature increases to 1.5 °C and 2 °C, it is suggested that achieving deep decarbonization within the aviation sector within the specified timeframe is contingent upon a reduction in air travel in certain markets. The decreases in carbon intensity of aviation energy in net-zero scenarios "are heavily dependent on projected changes in aviation demand and energy intensity". The significant challenges of sustainable aviation fuel expansion, including food security, local community impacts, and land use issues, underscore the importance of simultaneous demand reduction efforts. For instance, according to a report by the Royal Society, to produce enough biofuel to supply the UK's aviation industry would require using half of Britain's farming land which would put major pressures on food supplies.

Tourism is projected to generate up to 40% of total global CO_{2} emissions by 2050. Of climate change mitigation consumption options investigated by a review, the consumption options with "the highest mitigation potential advocate reduction in car and air travel". A study projected a potential reduction of "transport direct CO_{2} emissions by around 50% in the end of the century compared to the baseline" via combined behavioral factors.

== Measures ==
According to the IPCC Sixth Assessment Report, "the greatest Avoid potential" in demand-side mitigation, which consists of Avoid-Shift-Improve (ASI) options, "comes from reducing long-haul aviation and providing short-distance low-carbon urban infrastructure". It lists the following related mobility measures:

- Avoid: integrate transport & land use planning, tele-working, fewer long-haul flights, local holidays
- Shift: from air travel to high-speed rail

It found that socio-cultural factors promoting a preference for train travel over long-haul flights have the potential to reduce aviation greenhouse gas emissions by 10% to 40% by 2050.

=== Role of targeted measures in demand mitigation ===
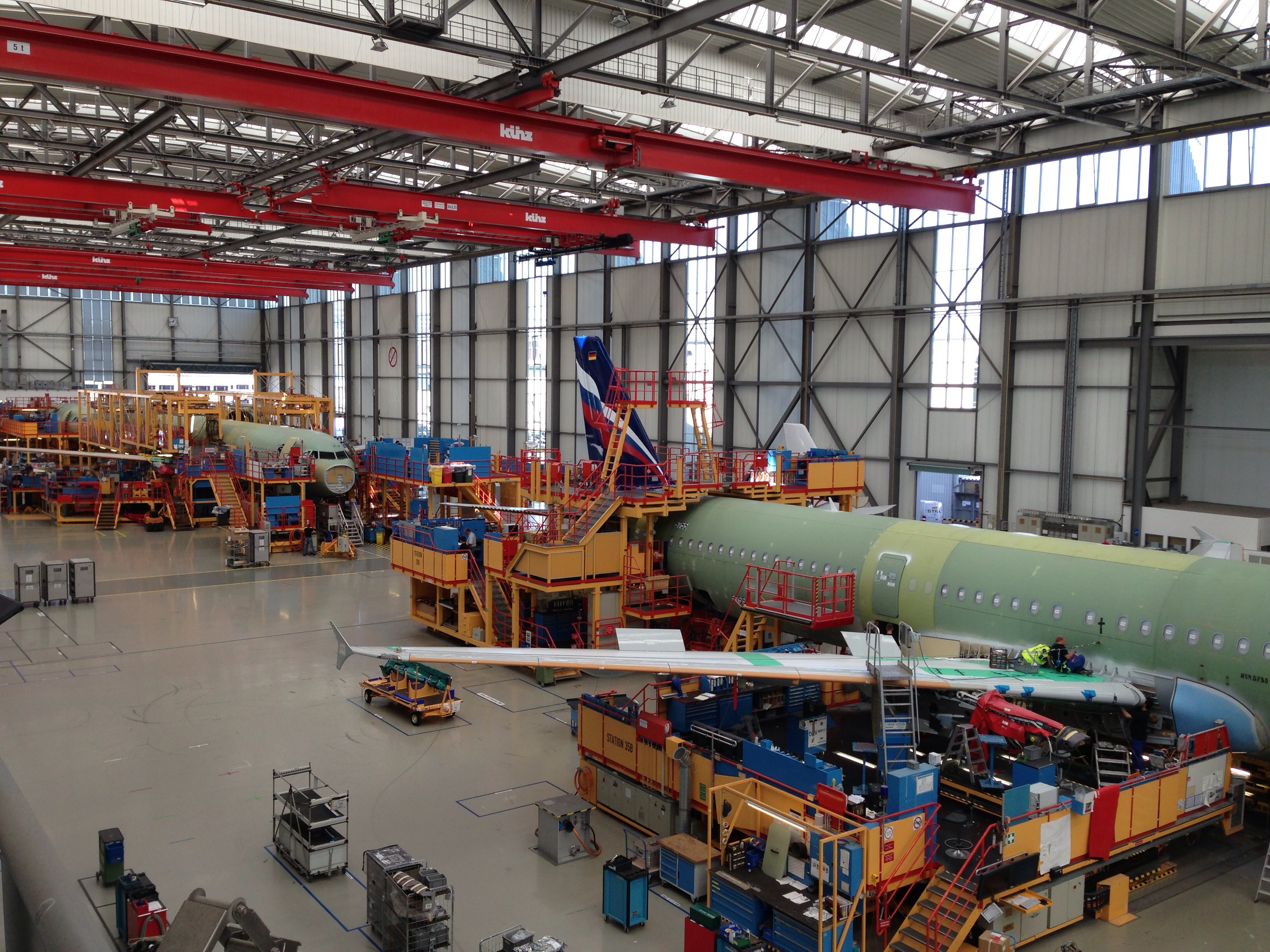
Production of an Airbus A321 in 2013, the most used aircraft as of 2022 with more of the product line entering the market as of 2023

The IPCC report also concluded that "voluntary behaviour change can support emissions reduction, but behaviours that are not convenient to change are unlikely to shift without changes to policy". A study demonstrated varying attitudes towards environmental measures across different contexts. While voluntary measures like carbon offsetting faced skepticism, there was more willingness to accept regulatory measures, including government intervention through taxation. The study concluded that voluntary approaches alone would be insufficient, emphasizing the need for a diverse policy mix to promote behavioral change in public flying habits. The response of governments "has been to encourage voluntary public behaviour change towards lower carbon lifestyles; an approach that has failed to gain traction in the context of discretionary tourist air travel".

Cities can increase the capability of citizens to make sustainable choices such as by "changing urban form to increase locational and mobility options and providing feedback mechanisms to support socio-behavioural change". Socio-politico-technical feedback processes could "be decisive for climate policy and emissions outcomes". A modal shift away from air transport is complicated by that many people are "used to the current affordability, flexibility and speed of air travel" due to which "passenger acceptance will be a significant barrier to modal shifts and lower cruising speed particularly in wealthy nations". Collective efforts to reduce air-travel-related carbon emissions are much more likely to be successful than isolated attempts.

A 2020 study reported that authors "could not locate quantitative research on large-scale modal shifts and demand reduction in aviation, except during the COVID-19 lockdown."

Related policies have been called "travel demand management" (TDM) policies or "mobility management strategies".

=== Short-haul flight restrictions ===
Per capita emissions from domestic and international flights

Restricting short-haul flights has a relatively high potential for reducing emissions (and non-emission forcing). One approach or element of such restrictions could be short-haul flight bans: A short-haul flight ban is a prohibition imposed by governments on airlines to establish and maintain a flight connection over a certain distance, or by organisations or companies on their employees for business travel using existing flight connections over a certain distance, in order to mitigate the environmental impact of aviation (most notably to reduce anthropogenic greenhouse gas emissions which is the leading cause of climate change). In the 21st century, several governments, organisations and companies have imposed restrictions and even prohibitions on short-haul flights, stimulating or pressuring travellers to opt for more environmentally friendly means of transportation, especially trains.

=== Improvement of train infrastructure ===
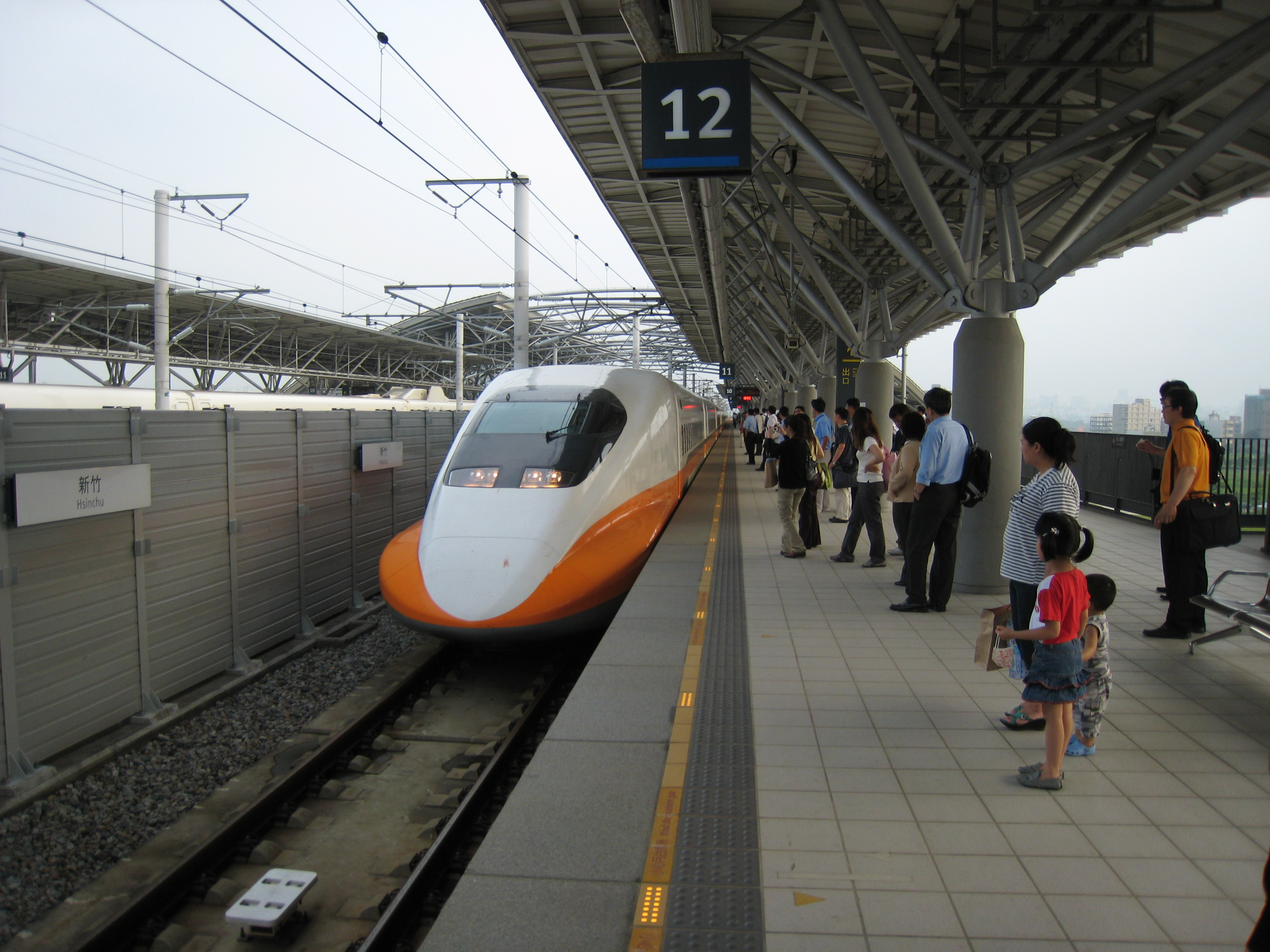
The Taiwan High Speed Rail in 2007

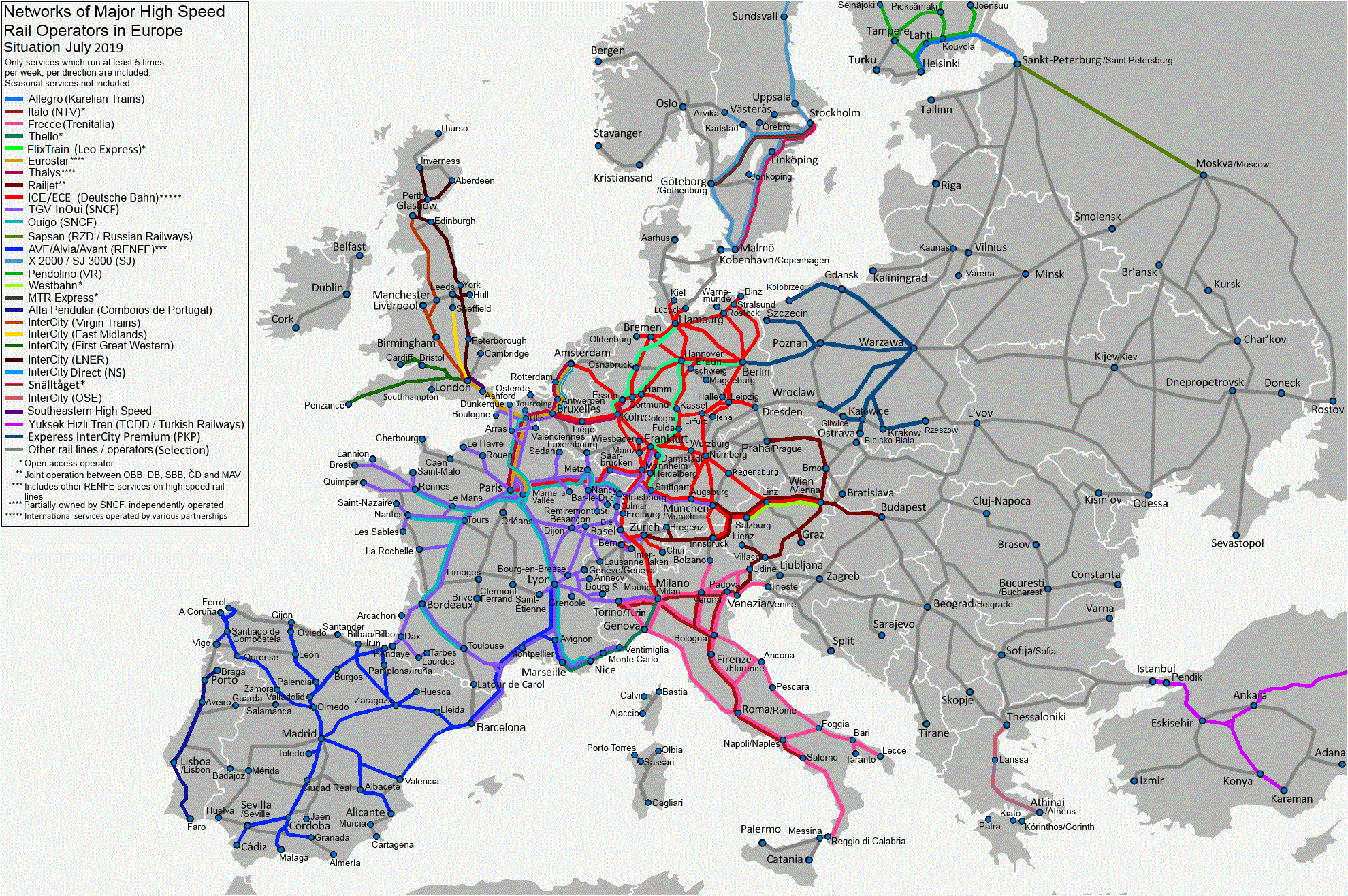
Networks of major high speed rail operators in Europe, ~2018

A shift towards high-speed rail could replace air travel. While improvements in rail travel times "have resulted in reductions in short-haul air travel", substitution results vary. Notably, concurrent "expansion of low-cost carriers has led to a significant increase in total European air traffic". Air travel demand decreased significantly after the entry of the Beijing-Shanghai high-speed rail. Costs of train trips are often higher but can in some cases "be offset by travelling on an overnight train and avoiding the cost of a hotel room".

In studies up to 2022, levels of air traffic reduction from substitution by rail ranged between 7% and 28% – for example, one study estimated that about 17% of intra-European short- and medium-haul traffic can be substituted by rail with an up to 20% increase in travel time. Not considering complementary concurrent measures, another study estimated that air traffic could be reduced by 25% if high-speed rail were available between all major cities. One study from 2005 found there "recently been a rather large reduction of between 34% and 75% in domestic aviation demand in Korea", identifying "the introduction of several new highway services and the fact that Korea Train Express (KTX) began operating a route between Seoul and Daegu in April 2004" as the "two primary causes".

Train connections can reduce feeder flights.

=== Regional travel ===
Local holidays can avoid emissions. Boosting or building "travel bubbles" (limited-range tourism) "through other means of transport like train services with landlocked countries" and encouraging more domestic tourism could help in substantial reductions of air travel demand. Long-distance travel can be replaced with travel along short-haul regional bubbles.

A study suggests that a stronger demand for medium- to long-haul air transport is the main driver of the tourism industry's increasing greenhouse gas emissions. A 2014 study notes that the travel sector could compensate for losses from distant-destination travel mitigation, for instance, "by investing in less carbon-intensive (domestic, short-haul) tourism or by raising a small fee on long-haul travel to contribute to a special poverty alleviation fund. It also found that a "reduction in tourist travel distances" has significantly less severe impacts than previously envisioned". It "strongly recommended" that future research examines "impacts of specific policies aimed at reducing the growth of tourism transport demand for long- and medium-haul travel based on the adoption of a more holistic approach and the inclusion of economic aspects in a more systematic manner". Moreover, there also are "negative impacts of the current growth of air transport on the tourism economies in both poor and wealthy countries" as many countries "may attract additional tourists by reducing the distances that people travel", specifically those viably reachable by high-speed rail or other low-carbon modes of transport from domestic and nearby countries.

A study indicates promotion of low-carbon travel markets could play a role and noted that "[l]ong-haul markets are [...] generally much more carbon-intensive than visitors from proximal (nearby) source markets, even though they tend to stay longer and spend more per journey". It also noted that destination country governments could contribute to optimizing the demand mix proactively and that the "current approach toward the tourism market mix is largely passive".

=== Changes to international conferences ===
Most international professional or academic conference attendants travel by plane, conference travel is often regarded as an employee benefit as costs are supported by employers. The Tyndall Centre has reported means to change common institutional and professional practices. Environmental impacts of in-person conferences can also be reduced via "multi-site" or "multi-hub hybrid conferences" with "spatially optimized conference hubs".

=== Air travel infrastructure ===
Building new or larger airports increase greenhouse gas emissions. A "limit to airport expansion" could suppress demand. Concerning constraints to individual airports' capacities, one study suggests that "airlines would adjust operations within a constrained flight network in such a way as to avoid airports with high delays". The large expansion in air travel over the last decades has been facilitated by the increased network of airports along with the "relative cheapness of flights (compared to other travel modes), greater incomes and more available leisure time".

=== Economics ===
Changes in prices – mainly concurrent increases and decreases in ticket prices – "will impact air transport demand and supply characteristics", making travelers consider alternative travel modes. While demand does not appear to be sensitive to small incremental price changes, "particularly for long-haul and business trips", more significant price increases could significantly suppress demand. High carbon taxes may be needed for shifts to high-speed trains. Distance-based air passenger taxes through increased ticket prices could reduce demand, depending on the tax level and price elasticity. Taxes may be especially effective "if there is a direct link between punishing polluting behaviour and investments that benefit many". Targeted interventions could make not only air travel more expensive but also train tickets cheaper using, for instance, subsidies.

Humans who travel have a "Travel Time Budget (TTB) and Travel Money Budget (TMB)".

=== Norms, social feedback, psychology, and awareness ===
Current norms may promote unsustainable behaviors like frequent flying. Air travel is relevant to contemporary social capital generation. (e.g. see standard of living or life activities, interpersonal attraction, social norm, and motivations for travel)

The failure of voluntary policy-independent changes has been partly explained by "contemporary neoliberal western lifestyles" which encourage "unrestrained consumption" of the socioeconomic system's products. The "deeply embedded nature of contemporary tourist air travel in developed societies" has been described as 'air travel addiction' which could be compared to other public health issues and related lobbies. Social media "has been instrumental in creating an interest in frequent air travel". A study notes that declining real cost of air travel "has 'normalized' flying into an everyday activity.

Sustainability education – e.g. about the impacts of aviation, flights and climate change – can also play a role in reducing air travel demand. Moreover, a review finds that if the media stops "uncritical reporting on technology 'solutions'", this would raise feelings of responsibility and if it does "not accept advertisement for air travel", this could reduce demand. There are reports about some implemented bans for advertisements for emissions-intensive products that include cheap short-haul flights.

Information provision, "to encourage and stimulate pro-climate decision-making", and related 'nudging' and social marketing approaches could also play a role. A study outlines potential decision-making or psychological reactions by air travelers "feeling accountable for emissions", including cognitive dissonance.

There are organizations that campaign for targets-based demand management interventions such as removing "the considerable tax breaks the aviation industry receives, through not paying VAT or fuel duty" or "airport expansion" such as UK's AirportWatch and the global Stay Grounded.

Bottom-up voluntary unbeneficial action such as flying less if sustained "could alter social norms can spark collective action and move the needle on policy". It can also alter incentives for top-down decisions including consumer demand and raise expectations for reciprocity as collectively "We punish free riders who don't do their part and reward those who chip in", which could co-trigger some level of further action, for instance from the industry. The Fridays for Future movement prompted "debates regarding the desirability and justifiability of air travel, with evidence of [some subsequent] avoidance and substitution".

==== Flight shame ====
In Sweden the concept of "flight shame" or "flygskam" has been cited as a cause of falling air travel. To a small extent, the concept has also spread globally. Swedish rail company SJ AB reports that twice as many Swedish people chose to travel by train instead of by air in summer 2019 compared with the previous year. Swedish airports operator Swedavia reported 4% fewer passengers across its 10 airports in 2019 compared to the previous year despite global growth: a 9% drop for domestic passengers and 2% for international passengers.

=== Personal carbon allowances ===
With personal carbon allowances (PCAs), certificates must be used for GHG-intensive activities. If they were implemented, they could also include air travel. According to Sodha, "rationing everyone's flights" – an "individual cap on air travel, that people can trade with each other" – could play a role in climate change mitigation.

In 2021, a study published in Nature Sustainability concluded that PCAs could be a component of climate change mitigation. It found there currently is an open window of opportunity for first trial implementations in climate-conscious technologically advanced countries. PCAs could consist of credit-feedbacks and decreasing default levels of per capita emissions allowances.

A PCA scheme was trialed in the UK with 100 volunteers, showing the technical feasibility of the scheme in 2008. The nature of the traded credits for personal consumption could lead to additional psychology-based impacts when compared to a carbon tax. A rationing framework may reduce air travel in a fair and just way.

=== Other ===
- Telepresence and remote work: adoption of teleworking, remote working, videoconferencing, and other telepresence technologies, can reduce flight demand.
- Restricting the use of private jets
- Frequent flyer levies (FFLs)
- Prior-travel evaluation: a study suggests many people who took flights for purposes other than vacation considered a large share of their flights to have been of little importance or unnecessary, suggesting "curtailing travel" may be possible by further means. The COVID-19 pandemic illustrated that a significant share of business travel is unnecessary.
- Delegation: Bearne suggested that if there is "someone who lives or works nearer to the event or meeting who could go", this could be leveraged to reduce air travel.

Alternative propulsion has limited near-term potential, as commercial availability of such designs is expected only after 2030.

== Air travel usage and social impacts ==
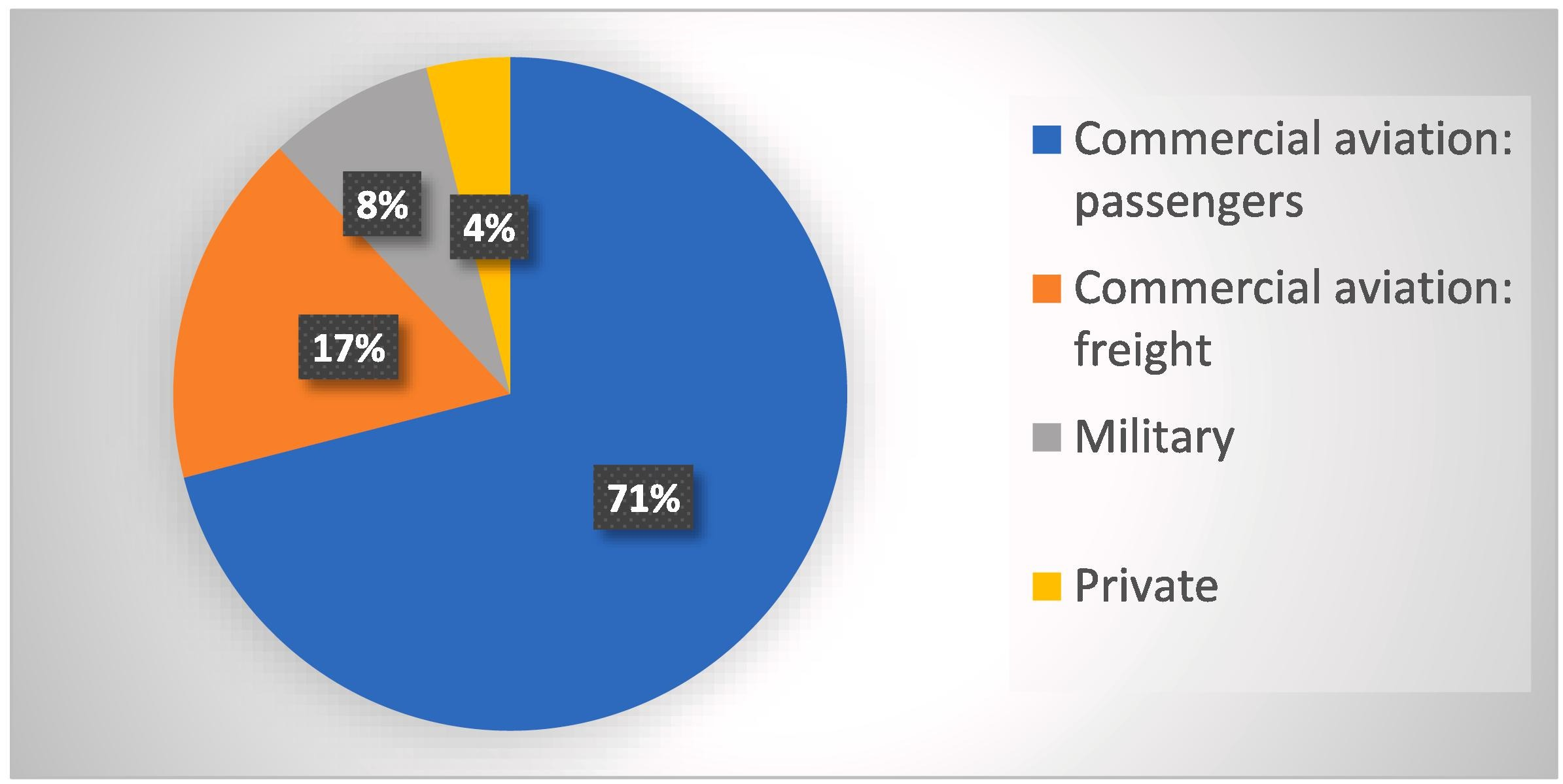
Global distribution of aviation fuel use

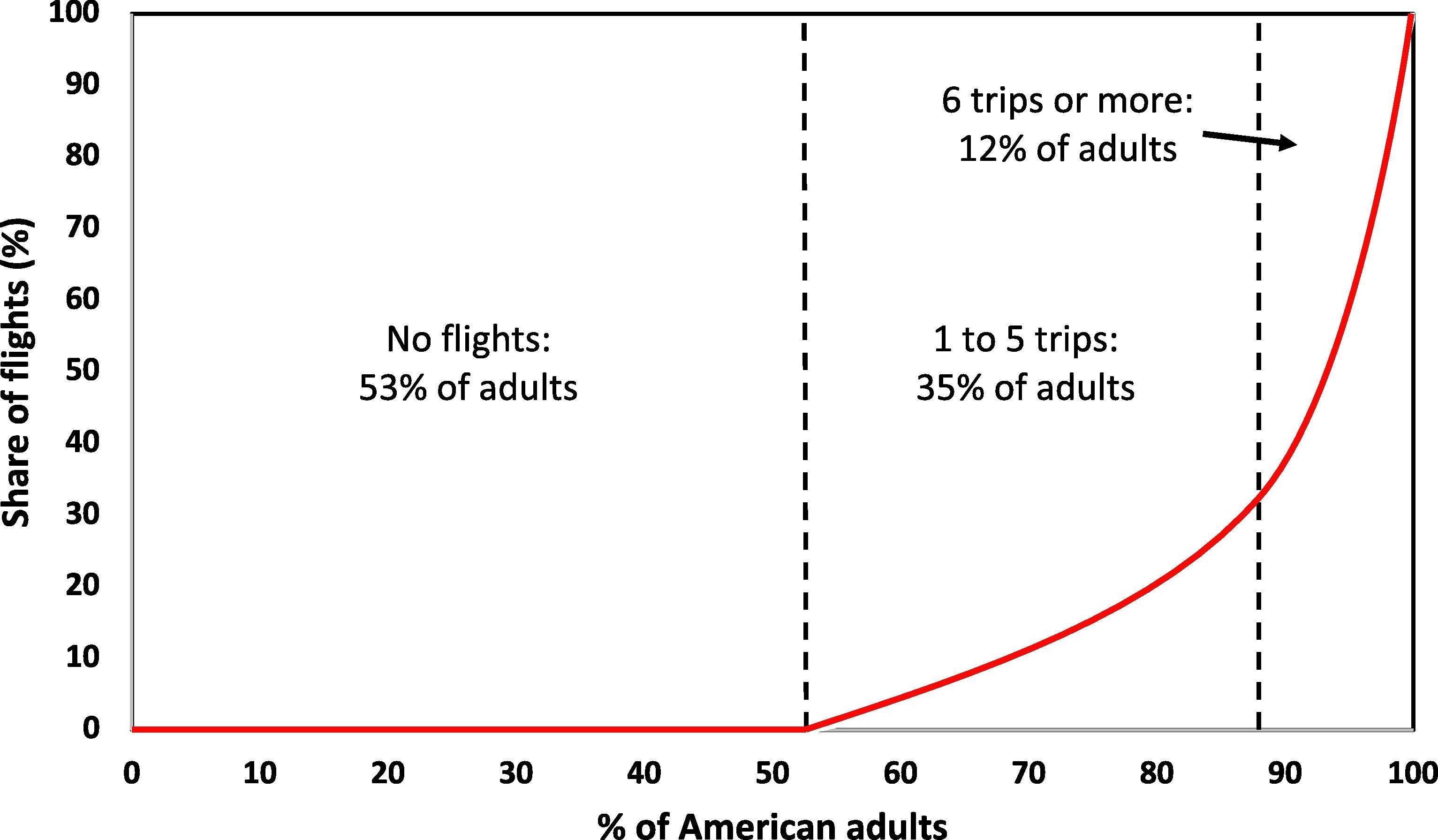
Air transport demand distribution in the US

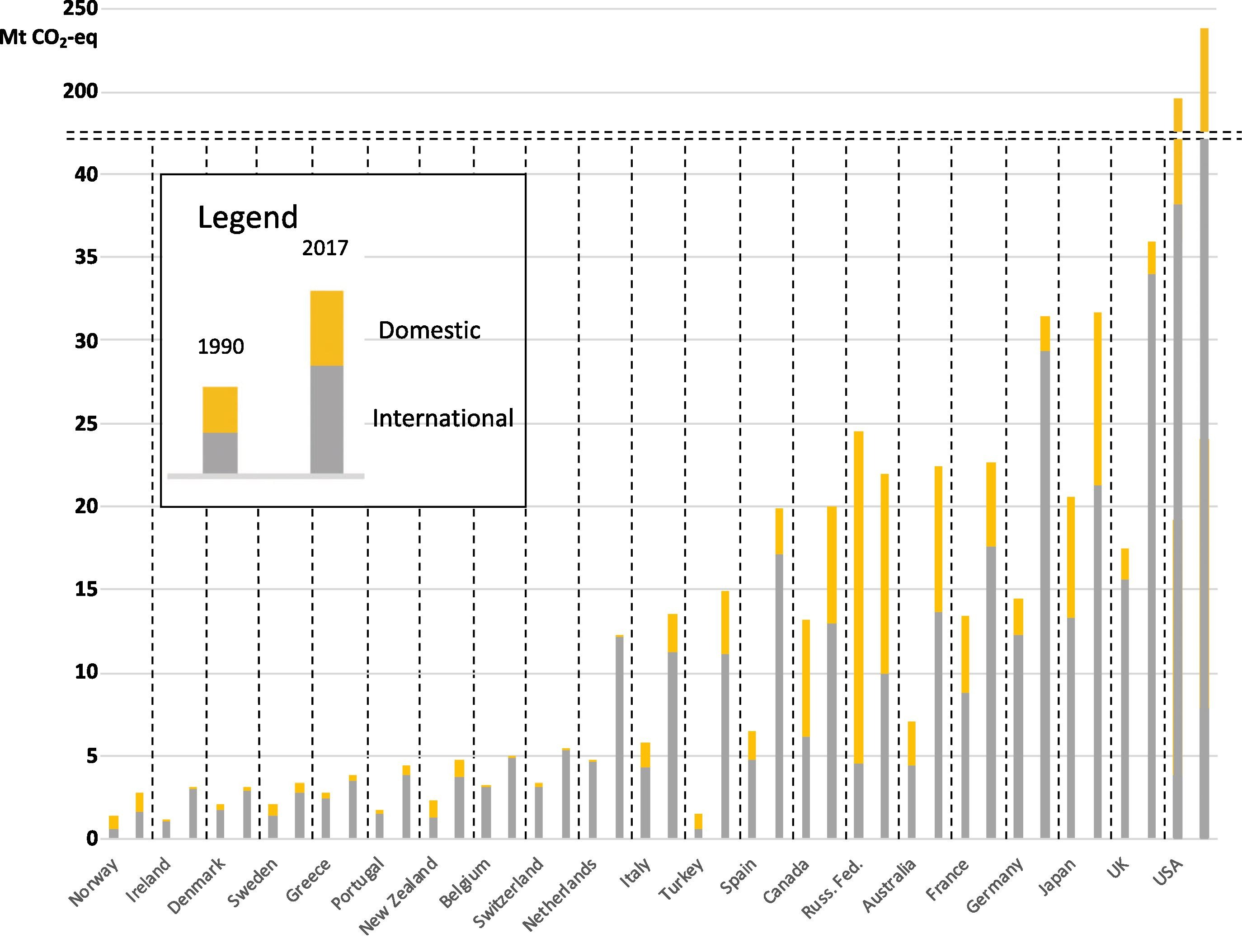
Aviation bunker fuel emissions in the 21 highest emitting Annex I countries

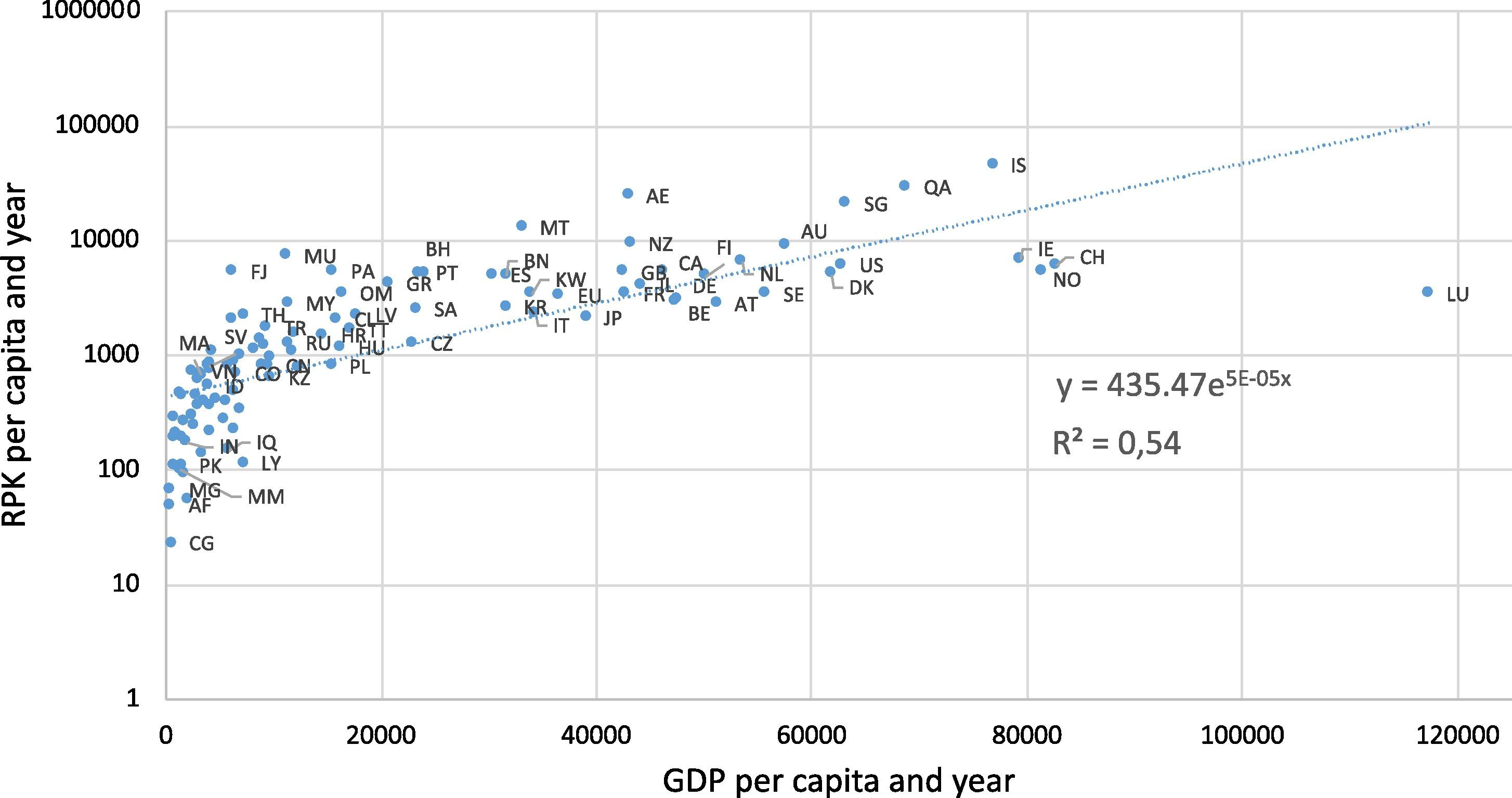
Revenue-passenger kilometers (RPK) and GDP (logarithmic scale)

The aviation industry's emissions are projected to continue to rise – and rapidly so – without related climate policy and demand for air travel is projected to quickly return to its pre-COVID-19 pandemic level.

A study found that "[l]ong-term scenarios generally project a steep increase in global travel demand, leading to an rapid rise in CO_{2} emissions", with "[m]ajor driving forces" being "the increasing car use in developing countries and the global growth in air travel".

Demand for air travel across countries and population groups is "closely associated with affluence and lifestyle". While "the share of passenger demand is substantially smaller in the Middle East (9%), Latin America and the Caribbean (5%) and Africa (2%), demand in those regions has been rapidly increasing, for example, growing by 234% in the Middle East between 2007 and 2019". It has been estimated that around 90% of people have never flown and 1% of the current population is responsible for 50% of current emissions from flying. It is estimated that, "at most, 11% of the global population flew in 2018, and only 2%–4% traveled between countries". Total aviation demand in 2019 was almost 1 trillion ton-kilometer equivalent with 78% representing passenger flights and 22% freight.

The ICCT estimates that 3% of the global population take regular flights.

Stefan Gössling of the Western Norway Research Institute estimates 1% of the world population emits half of commercial aviation's CO_{2}, while close to 90% does not fly in a given year.

A study finds that "disadvantaged groups" remain far less likely to be "affected by air travel demand management policies because air travel inequality is still at a very high level". Taxes on air travel would raise fewer fairness concerns than other types of carbon taxes. A study notes that in comparison, kinds of frequent flyer levies or levies on excessive consumption in general have the potential to (more easily or inherently) be "equitable, effective and politically acceptable environmental policy".

In early 2022, the European Investment Bank published the results of its 2021–2022 Climate Survey, showing that 52% of Europeans under 30, 37% of people between 30 and 64 and 25% of people aged 65 and above plan to travel by air for their summer holidays in 2022; and 27% of those under 30, 17% for people aged 30–64 and 12% for people aged 65 and above plan to travel by air to a faraway destination.

== See also ==
- Electric aircraft
- Hydrogen-powered aircraft
- Impact of the COVID-19 pandemic on aviation
- Travel during the COVID-19 pandemic
- Energy demand management
- Environmental psychology
- Demand destruction
- Marketing
- Water demand management
- Supply reduction
- Modal share
