= Smart mobility =

Electric cars, alternatives to cars, rentals

Smart mobility refers to many modes of transport.

Some smart mobility services include:

- Public transport (with real-time timetabling and route optimization, seamless travel and digital ticketing)
- Carsharing
- Mobility as a service (MaaS)
- Mobility on demand (MOD)
- Autonomous transport systems
- Smart mobility services in freight and logistics
- Drones and low-altitude aerial mobility

== Overview ==
=== Mobility as a service ===
Mobility as a service enables multimodal mobility by providing user-centric information and travel services (navigation, location, booking, payment, ...) hence allowing mobility as a seamless service across all transport modes. Mobility on Demand also don't require ownership of private automobiles and gives convenient access to a range of travel modes while socialising the high initial costs of switching to electric-vehicle based mobility. Integrated mobility on demand services can contribute to modal shift to public transport and also addresses spatial inefficiencies of private transport. The car also has a small role to play within smart mobility (it is particularly useful in a context which does not require personal ownership of the car, see above). Cars can be made to use intelligent transportation systems.

== Smart Mobility Hub ==
A Smart Mobility Hub is a physical location that integrates different shared transport options, such as car-sharing, bike-sharing and e-scooters, with public transport within walking distance. These hubs go beyond transport connections by combining three dimensions of integration: physical integration through accessible infrastructure and connections, digital integration through information and mobility services, and democratic integration through citizen participation in planning and decision-making.

== See also ==
- Smart city
- Shared mobility
- European Green Deal: Smart mobility is a component thereof
- Remote work
