= Stefan Gössling =

Swedish academic

Stefan Gössling (born 1970) is a Swedish academic who studied geography and biology at the University of Münster in Germany. He is a professor at the Linnaeus University School of Business and Economics and Lund University's Department of Service Management. He is also the research coordinator at the Western Norway Research Institute's Research Centre for Sustainable Tourism. Gössling is on the editorial board of the Journal of Sustainable Tourism.

Gössling has published, co-authored or presented a number of academic works, and co-edited the book Climate Change and Aviation: Issues, Challenges and Solutions (2009). With three co-authors he wrote the book's chapter on hypermobility. He also wrote the book Carbon Management in Tourism: Mitigating the Impacts on Climate Change and co-authored a chapter of a Finnish government report on development in a carbon-constrained world.

== See also ==
- Environmental impact of aviation
