= Car ownership =

Automobile as personal property

Car ownership is the ownership of a car. Car ownership typically requires far fewer permits than driving that car on public roads (i.e. driver's license, car insurance, etc.).

== History ==
Levels of ownership have risen significantly since automobiles were pioneered in the 19th century. The United States was the first country in which mass ownership became common and 60% of families owned a car in 1929. By the 21st century in the United States, there was, on average, a vehicle for every person of driving age and more vehicles than people with driving licenses. In 2010, the total number of vehicles dropped significantly for the first time, falling by four million to 247 million.

In the United Kingdom, only 14% of households had access to a car in 1951. By 1971, this had increased to 45%, and by 2001, it was at 75% (with many households having more than one car).

Overall, across the world, levels of ownership increased fourfold between 1950 and 1999.

== Forms of ownership ==
A car is typically a major purchase and so there are a variety of financial schemes to facilitate the purchase. These include hire purchase, company cars, trade-in and leasing. Other forms of provision which centralise the ownership as a service include rental, car sharing and vehicle hire.

== Legal requirements ==
In some countries, there are additional regulations that must be fulfilled before purchasing or leasing a car. For example, in Japan, due to the high population density and limited space, a prospective owner must first provide proof of a space to park the car in question (proof-of-parking).

In the Philippines and India, there is also interest in introducing proof-of-parking.

In Singapore, there are additional requirements in the form of Certificate of Entitlement which only allows the vehicle's owner to own the vehicle for 10 years. (Prospective) owners of heavy vehicles in Singapore must first provide proof of a space to park the heavy vehicle in question under the Vehicle Parking Certificate Scheme.

=== Consequences of legal requirements ===
In Japan, the proof-of-parking regulation, combined with high taxing, has caused a class of cars known as kei cars (kei jidōsha) to develop. These small cars, limited in dimension (3.40x1.48x2.00m length, width and height) and engine displacement (660 cc or 0.66 L) are popular due to tax discounts on the excise tax (3% instead of 5% for normal vehicles), the weight tax (30% cheaper), and the insurance cost is also more than 10% lower and the annual road tax, calculated on the engine size.

== Ownership documents ==
=== Title ===
In the United States, vehicle ownership is documented on a certificate of title. In the United States, each state's Department of Motor Vehicles or Registry of Motor Vehicles issues such documents when a vehicle is registered. Title deeds vary by design but always include vehicle-specific information at the front of the document (such as: year, make, model, VIN, color, etc.) and several boxes for transaction information at the back where information about change of ownership is recorded (such as sale date, odometer reading, seller and buyer names and signatures, etc.). In-state vehicle sales are recorded at the back of the title as long as there are unused reassignment boxes. If a vehicle is sold out-of-state, the new owner must apply for a new title at their local DMV office.

In Spain a second-hand vehicle ownership transfer is done at the DGT office or Tráfico as it's known locally. Transfer tax must be paid using a Modelo 620 form. This must be done within 30 days after signing the contract of sale for the vehicle and must be done by the buyer.

=== MCO ===
In the United States, the Manufacturer’s Certificate of Origin (MCO), also known as Manufacturer's Statement of Origin (MSO) is the ownership document issued by the vehicle manufacturer that assigns ownership of a new vehicle to a franchise car dealership until said vehicle is registered and titled. This document is similar to the title deed in content, but is to be used among licensed car dealers only.

== Rates of car ownership ==
In the developed world, the number of cars per 100 people is generally between 30 and 50, with a few countries (such as Canada and New Zealand) over this. In China there are 15 cars per 100 people, and very poor countries such as Somalia have less than one car per thousand people.

In 2007, the expectation was that the rate of car ownership would be increasing almost everywhere, and rise very rapidly indeed in countries such as China and India. About ten years later, however, there is a trend from car ownership towards shared mobility, as countries try to reduce congestion and pollution caused by traffic in cities. For example, in Singapore, due to the Certificate of Entitlement quota system, the growth on the car population in the country has remained at zero percent since 2017. As the price of a Certificate of Entitlement fluctuates with market demand, the price of a Cat A certificate (for cars with engines of 1,600cc and below) hit a record high of S$106,000 (US$77,380) in October 2023. Additional taxes are also added to the car purchase price depending on the market value of the car when it was imported. This has resulted in Singapore being the most expensive place in the world to own a car, and has resulted in car ownership rates dropping to about 33% in 2023, a decrease from 40% in 2013.

== See also ==
- Economics of car use
- Effects of the car on societies
- Carsharing
- History of the automobile
- Modal share
- Neighborhood Electric Vehicle
- Micromobility
