= Modal share =

Share of mode of transport

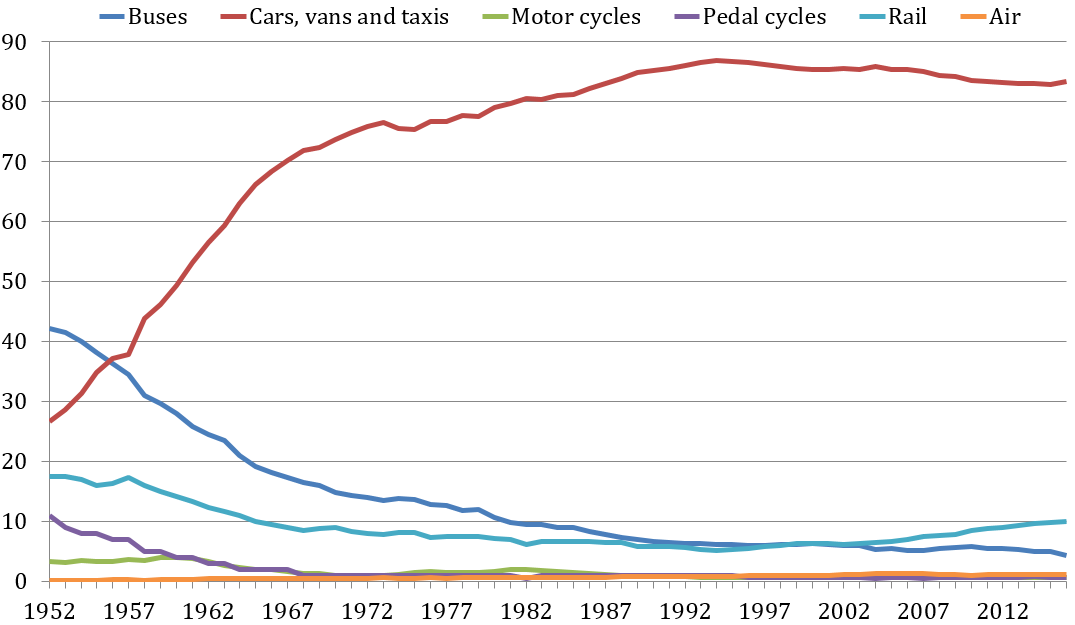
United Kingdom transport modal share from 1952 to 2014, Department for Transport

A modal share (also called mode split, mode-share, or modal split) is the percentage of travelers using a particular type of transportation or number of trips using said type. In freight transportation, this may be measured in mass.

Modal share is an important component in developing sustainable transport within a city or region. In recent years, many cities have set modal share targets for balanced and sustainable transport modes, particularly 30% of non-motorized (cycling and walking) and 30% of public transport. These goals reflect a desire for a modal shift, or a change between modes, and usually encompasses an increase in the proportion of trips made using sustainable modes.

== Comparability of data ==
Modal share data is usually obtained by travel surveys, which are often conducted by local governments, using different methodologies. Sampling and interviewing techniques, definitions, the extent of geographical areas and other methodological differences can influence comparability. Most typical surveys refer to the main mode of transport used during trips to work. Surveys covering entire metropolitan areas are preferred over city proper surveys which typically cover only the denser inner city. As of 26 August 2025 the reference years in these lists span over two decades, making comparisons problematic, especially given changing population, new transportation infrastructure and the effect of the COVID-19 pandemic, among other factors.

== Modal split of journeys to work ==
The following tables present the modal split of journeys to work. It is better to use a measure of all trips on a typical weekday, but journey to work data is more readily available. It would also be beneficial to disaggregate private motor vehicles figures to car driver, car passengers and motorbikes (especially relevant for Asian cities).

=== Metropolitan areas with over 1,000,000 inhabitants ===
Metro area	Walking	Cycling	Public transport	Private motor vehicle	Year	Survey area	Country
(Australia) Adelaide	3%	1%	11%	85%	2016	GCCSA	Australia
(United States) Atlanta	1%	0%	3%	86%	2016	UA	USA
(Greece) Athens	8%	2%	37%	53%	2006		Greece
(New Zealand) Auckland	5%	1%	12%	81%	2018	MUA	New Zealand
(United States) Austin	2%	1%	3%	83%	2019		USA
(United States) Baltimore	3%	0%	7%	84%	2016	UA	USA
(Indonesia) Bandung	5%	1%	11%	82%*	2017	UA *74% motorbike	Indonesia
(Indonesia) Banjarmasin	2%		3%	93%	2023	UA	Indonesia
(Spain) Barcelona	34.35%	2.28%	37.33%	26.04%	2018		Spain
(China) Beijing	21%	32%	26%	21%	2005/2011		China
(Serbia) Belgrade	23%	1%	49%	27%	2015		Serbia
(Germany) Berlin	34%	18%	26%	22%	2023		Germany
(Australia) Brisbane	4%	1%	14%	81%	2016	GCCSA	Australia
(Belgium) Brussels	36%	9%	24%	29%	2022		Belgium
(Colombia) Bogotá	24%	7%	43%	15%	2019		Colombia
(United States) Boston	5%	1%	14%	73%	2016	UA	USA
(Romania) Bucharest	31%	2%	27%	36%	2015	Other (taxi): 4%	Romania
(Hungary) Budapest	32%	1%	47%	20%	2011		Hungary
(Canada) Calgary	4%	1%	8%	84%	2021	CMA	Canada
(United States) Chicago	4%	1%	11%	82%	2024	UA	USA
(Germany) Cologne	25%	19%	21%	35%	2017		Germany
(United States) Dallas	1%	0%	2%	90%	2016	UA	USA
(South Korea) Daejeon	26%	2%	28%	44%	2012		South Korea
(India) Delhi	21%	12%	48%	19%	2008/2011		India
(Indonesia) Denpasar	0%		1%	99%	2023	UA	Indonesia
(United States) Detroit	1%	0%	2%	92%	2016		USA
(United States) Denver	2%	1%	4%	81%	2020	UA	USA
(Bangladesh) Dhaka	19%	39%	29%	13%	2009		Bangladesh
(Republic of Ireland) Dublin	18%	7%	15%	59%	2020		Ireland
(Canada) Edmonton	3%	1%	6%	87%	2021	CMA	Canada
(China) Guangzhou	35%	19%	22%	23%	2021		China
(Germany) Hamburg	22%	22%	24%	32%	2022		Germany
(Finland) Helsinki	10.99%	9.34%	32.42%	46%	2016	MA, Other: 0.5%	Finland
Hong Kong	11%	0.5%	77%	12%	2011		China
(United States) Houston	1%	0%	2%	91%	2016	UA	USA
(United States) Indianapolis	1%	0%	1%	91%	2016	UA	USA
(Indonesia) Jakarta	1%	0.2%	20%	78%*	2019	UA *67% motorbike	Indonesia
(Malaysia) Kuala Lumpur	0.5%	0.5%	21%	78%	2018		Malaysia
(United States) Las Vegas	1%	0%	4%	90%	2016	UA	USA
(United Kingdom) London	26%	2.5%	44.5%	27%	2020		UK
(United States) Los Angeles	3%	1%	5%	85%	2016	UA	USA
(Spain) Madrid	34%	0.5%	25%	40%	2018		Spain
(Indonesia) Makassar	1%		3%	95%	2023	UA	Indonesia
(Philippines) Manila	9%	2%	44%	45%	2019		Philippines
(Australia) Melbourne	4%	2%	19%	76%	2016	GCCSA	Australia
(Indonesia) Medan	0%	1%	20%	78%*	2019	UA *70% motorbike	Indonesia
Mexico City	1%	1%	71%	22%	2019		Mexico
(United States) Miami	2%	1%	4%	87%	2016	UA	USA
(Italy) Milan	13%	7%	43%	32%	2025		Italy
(Belarus) Minsk	13%	1%	63%	20%	2016		Belarus
(Canada) Montreal	5%	2%	22%	70%	2016	CMA	Canada
(India) Mumbai	27%	6%	52%	15%	2008/2011		India
(Germany) Munich	33%	21%	22%	24%	2023		Germany
(Japan) Nagoya	15%	13%	30%	43%	2011		Japan
(United States) New York City	30.7%	1.1%	32.1%	30.2%	2019	UA	USA
(Japan) Osaka	7%	19%	61%	13%	2010		Japan
(Canada) Ottawa	8%	2%	18%	72%	2016	CMA	Canada
(Indonesia) Palembang	2%		13%	83%	2023	UA	Indonesia
(France) Paris	40%	2%	22%	34%	2020	Parisiens	France
(Australia) Perth	3%	1%	12%	84%	2016	GCCSA	Australia
(United States) Philadelphia	4%	1%	10%	80%	2016	UA	USA
(United States) Phoenix	2%	1%	2%	87%	2016	UA	USA
(United States) Portland	3%	3%	7%	78%	2016	UA	USA
(Czech Republic) Prague	35%	1%	37%	25%	2021		Czech Republic
(Brazil) Rio de Janeiro	29%	3%	43%	25%	2012	UA	Brazil
(Italy) Rome	4%	1%	29%	66%	2014		Italy
(United States) San Antonio	2%	0%	3%	90%	2016	UA	USA
(United States) San Diego	3%	1%	3%	85%	2016	UA	USA
(United States) San Francisco	5%	2%	20%	64%	2016	UA	USA
(United States) San Jose	2%	2%	5%	84%	2016	UA	USA
(Chile) Santiago	34.5%	4%	29.6%	25.7%	2012	UA	Chile
(Brazil) São Paulo	32%	1%	36%	31%	2017	UA	Brazil
(United States) Seattle	4%	1%	10%	77%	2016	UA	USA
(South Korea) Seoul	N/A	4%	66%	23%	2014		South Korea
(China) Shanghai	27%	20%	33%	20%	2009/2011		China
Singapore	22%	1%	44%	33%	2011		Singapore
(Bulgaria) Sofia	N/A	N/A	73% (Note: Result achieved using the percentage of commuters using PT (63%) plus Taxi (3%) and additionally marshrutkas (7%).)	27%	2010		Bulgaria
(Sweden) Stockholm	14%	7%	47%	32%	2011		Sweden
(Indonesia) Surabaya	0%	2%	3%	91%*	2017	UA *83% motorbike	Indonesia
(Australia) Sydney	5%	1%	27%	65%	2020	Deloitte	Australia
(Taiwan) Taipei	13%	4%	43%	40%	2016		Taiwan
(Israel) Tel Aviv	8.2%	4.3%	17.7%	62.5%	2022		Israel
(Japan) Tokyo	23%	14%	51%	12%	2008/2009		Japan
(Canada) Toronto	5%	1%	16%	76%	2021	CMA	Canada
(Canada) Vancouver	6%	2%	15%	75%	2021	CMA	Canada
(Austria) Vienna	30%	11%	34%	25%	2024		Austria
(Poland) Warsaw	18%	3%	47%	32%	2015		Poland
(United States) Washington, D.C.	3%	1%	6%	56%	2022	UA	USA

=== Metropolitan areas with over 250,000 inhabitants ===
Metro area	walking	cycling	public transport	private motor vehicle	year
(Denmark) Aarhus	7%	27%	19%	43%	2004
(Spain) Alicante	18%	0%	13%	69%	2004
(Netherlands) Amsterdam	5%	30%	19%	42%	2020
(Italy) Bari	13%	1%	14%	72%	2001
(Switzerland) Basel	33%	17%	27%	22%	2015
(Switzerland) Bern	30%	15%	32%	22%	2015
(Spain) Bilbao	68.1%	0.9%	19.6%	11.1%	2021
(United Kingdom) Birmingham	1%	1%	25%	66%	2001
(Italy) Bologna	8%	4%	21%	67%	2001
(Germany) Bonn	28%	15%	17%	41%	2017
(Slovakia) Bratislava	26.7%	1.6%	32.6%	37.7%	2014
(Czech Republic) Brno	5%	2%	57%	32%	2012
(United States) Buffalo	6%	1%	14%	79%	2012
(Germany) Bremen	25%	25%	15%	36%	2018
(United Kingdom) Bristol	19%	8%	12%	55%	2011
(Australia) Canberra	5%	3%	8%	85%	2016
(New Zealand) Christchurch	4%	6%	5%	84%	2018
(Denmark) Copenhagen	30%	26%	18%	26%	2021
(Spain) Córdoba	18%	1%	10%	71%	2004
(Germany) Dortmund	19%	10%	22%	49%	2019
(Germany) Dresden	26%	18%	20%	36%	2018
(Republic of Ireland) Dublin	13.2%	7.6%	21.5%	48.5%	2016
(Germany) Düsseldorf	34%	13%	18%	35%	2017
(United Kingdom) Edinburgh	19%	7%	30%	42%	2009–2010
(Netherlands) Eindhoven	3%	24%	8%	65%	2004
(Germany) Essen	19%	7%	19%	55%	2019
(Italy) Florence	8%	4%	21%	69%	2001
(Germany) Frankfurt	11%	15%	30%	44%	2015
(Germany) Freiburg im Breisgau	29%	34%	16%	21%	2017
(Belgium) Gent	15.6%	33.8%	11.2%	39%	2021
(Poland) Gdańsk	20.8%	5.9%	32.1%	41.2%	2016
(Spain) Gijón	24%	0%	17%	59%	2004
(Sweden) Gothenburg	12%	14%	21%	52%	2004
(Austria) Graz	19%	19%	20%	42%	2018
(Netherlands) The Hague	5%	22%	30%	43%	2004
(Canada) Halifax	8%	1%	12%	78%	2016
(Canada) Hamilton	4%	1%	10%	84%	2016
(Germany) Hanover	26%	19%	19%	36%	2017
(Poland) Kraków	28.4%	1.2%	36.3%	33.7%	2013
(Spain) Las Palmas	15%	0.42%	13%	68%	2011
(Portugal) Lisbon	15.6%	2.5%	30.8%	50.2%	2020
(Spain) Málaga	12%	0%	11%	77%	2004
(Sweden) Malmö	14%	26%	25%	34%	2018
(Spain) Murcia	18%	1%	7%	74%	2004
(Italy) Naples	13%	0%	26%	60%	2001
(Germany) Nuremberg	30%	15%	23%	32%	2023
(Norway) Oslo	32%	6%	31%	29%	2022
(Italy) Palermo	12%	1%	9%	78%	2001
(Spain) Pamplona	42%	2%	13%	41%	2013
(Poland) Poznań	20.6%	8.4%	33.7%	37.3%	2019
(Canada) Quebec City	2%	6%	11%	80%	2016
(Netherlands) Rotterdam	5%	14%	25%	56%	2004
(Spain) Seville	13%	7%	18%	62%	2014
(Germany) Stuttgart	29%	8%	23%	40%	2017
(Estonia) Tallinn	14%	2%	34%	49%	2020
(Finland) Tampere	10%	10%	14%	66%	2021
(Italy) Turin	12%	3%	5%	79%	2004
(Netherlands) Utrecht	25.3%	48.4%	5.4%	18.7%	2018
(Spain) Valencia	16%	1%	21%	62%	2004
(Spain) Valladolid	22%	1%	20%	57%	2004
(Spain) Vigo	19%	0%	13%	68%	2004
(Lithuania) Vilnius	36%	0%	26%	38%	2011
(Spain) Vitoria-Gasteiz	45.6%	8.0%	9.5%	35.5%	2021
(New Zealand) Wellington	21%	4%	23%	49%	2018
(Canada) Victoria (CMA)	10%	7%	11%	70%	2016
(Canada) Winnipeg	5%	2%	14%	79%	2016
(Poland) Wrocław	24.2%	6.3%	27.6%	41.4%	2018
(Spain) Zaragoza	45.91%	2.90%	23.71%	26.88%	2017
(Switzerland) Zürich	33%	12%	32%	21%	2015
Mean ± SD	13±8%	8±9%	24±13%	55±17%	

Notes: European data is based on the Urban Audit

== Modal share targets ==
The Charter of Brussels, signed by 36 cities including Brussels, Ghent, Milan, Munich, Seville, Edinburgh, Toulouse, Bordeaux, Gdansk, and Timișoara, commits the signatories to achieve at least 15% of bicycling modal share by 2020, and calls upon European institutions to do likewise. The cycling modal share is strongly associated with the size of local cycling infrastructure.

The Canadian city of Hamilton adopted a similar modal share target plan in 2005.

== Modal share in the developing world ==
The modal share differs considerably depending on each city in the developing world.

According to UNECE, the global on-road vehicle fleet is to double by 2050 (from 1,2 billion to 2,5 billion, see introduction), with most future car purchases taking place in developing countries. Some experts even mention that the number of vehicles in developing countries will increase by 4 or 5-fold by 2050 (compared to current car use levels), and that the majority of these will be second-hand.

== Legislation impacting the modal share ==
Legislation can discourage car ownership through, for example, taxation and conditions on new car purchases). This could help in achieving a modal shift.

== See also ==
- Air travel demand reduction – Climate change mitigation method
- Car ownership – Automobile as personal property
- Circulation plan
- Phase-out of fossil fuel vehicles
- Intermodal passenger transport – Places for travelers to transfer from one category of vehicle to another
- Mobility transition – Change in transport planning and policy
- Mode choice – Decisions that determine Modal share
- Mode of transport – Movement of goods or people between locations
- Motonormativity – Car ownership as the social norm
- Rail usage statistics by country
- Road reallocation – Land route
- Environmental aspects of the electric car
- Smart mobility – Electric cars, alternatives to cars, rentals
