= Western Norway Research Institute =

Norwegian research foundation

- Address: Røyrgata 4, 6856 Sogndal
- Location: Sognahallen, Sogndalsfjøra
- Coordinates: 61°13′51″N 7°05′10″E
- Interactive map of Western Norway Research Institute
- Website: https://www.vestforsk.no/en

The Western Norway Research Institute (WRNI; Norwegian: Vestlandsforsking), is an assignment-based research foundation founded by Sogn og Fjordane County Municipality. Located in the Fosshaugane Campus, of the Sogn og Fjordane University College in Sogndalsfjøra (Sogndal Municipality), the institute is independent of the university and conducts research and development studies commissioned by research councils, industry and, the public sector. Though international in nature the institute maintains strong regional ties particularly in the fields of climate adaptation and rural tourism. Its special areas of expertise include; information communication, technology systems, organizational research, environmental research, sustainable tourism, environmental policy and energy production and use and, climate change social impacts, evaluation and adaptation.

== Research areas ==
=== Environment ===
In accordance with Agenda 21 guidelines, the institute takes the concept of sustainable development as the starting point in its environmental research programmes. Main thematic areas covered are: local environment and climate policy, industrial ecology, sustainable mobility, alternative fuels, and sustainable agriculture.

=== Innovation ===
Within this interdisciplinary field the institute is focused on the following: eGovernment and public sector organisation; Regional development; Infrastructure and networking; eCommerce in small and medium-sized businesses.

=== Tourism ===
Within this department the focus is on sustainable tourism, IT and tourism, and leisure-time consumption.

=== Usability ===
The institutes work in the field of Usability largely focuses on human computer interfaces (HCI), information architecture and semantic web. Most of the projects are user-oriented and include the following:

- Analysis of IT systems (mostly web sites and web applications) with the help of indicator systems
- Developing requirements specifications for web sites and web applications
- Developing controlled vocabularies for better semantic support in web portals
- Analysis and development of search systems, taxonomies and ontologies (through semantic technologies like topic maps)

== Climate change adaptation ==
The institute has been engaged in climate specific adaptation projects at a regional level through its involvement with NORADAPT - Community Adaptation and Vulnerability in Norway. Focus has been on how projected changes in climate interact with changes in socio-economic and institutional conditions, and how these interactions shape vulnerability and adaptation at the local level in Norway. This has led to a series of climate adaptation strategies being developed by municipalities such as Fredrikstad and Flora with the support of the institute. The institute is currently engaged in identifying the conditions that facilitate or constrain the adaptive capacity of municipalities to climate change with particular emphasis being placed on the interaction of climate and socioeconomic changes. This expertise led to the institute's involvement with the Northern Periphery Programme (NPP), Clim-ATIC, where it was activity co-ordinator, providing guidance and expertise on local climate change impacts and the combining of climate and socio-economic scenarios .

== International projects ==
The institute is engaged in a range of national and international projects and organisations such as POSC Caesar Association POSC Caesar (PCA) an international, open, not-for-profit, member organization that promotes the interoperability of data, software and related matters.

== Selected publications ==
=== Climate adaptation ===
- Historical records of natural hazards events as guidance for preventive spatial planning
- Local climate change adaptation: missing link, Black Jack or blind alley?
- Integrating climate change adaptation into civil protection: comparative lessons from Norway, Sweden and the Netherlands
- Implementing adaptation to climate change at the local level
- Klimatilpassing i Sogn og Fjordane anno 2008
- Klimaproblemet og bankenes tilpasning
- Exit War, Enter Climate? Institutional change and the introduction of climate adaptation in Norways public system of civil protection
- Report from the CIVILCLIM study tour to Sweden and the Netherlands, October 2008
- Naturskade i kommunene - Sluttrapport fra prosjekt for KS
- Regional klimasårbarheitsanalyse for Nord-Norge.
- Indicators for Local-Scale Climate Vulnerability Assessments
