= Hypermobility (travel) =

Act of taking frequent trips

Hypermobile travelers are "highly mobile individuals" who take "frequent trips, often over great distances." They "account for a large share of the overall kilometres travelled, especially by air." These people contribute significantly to the overall amount of air miles flown within a given society. Although concerns over hypermobility apply to several modes of transport, the environmental impact of aviation and especially its greenhouse gas emissions have brought particular focus on flying. Among the reasons for this focus is that these emissions, because they are made at high altitude, have a climate impact that is commonly estimated to be 2.7 times greater than the same emissions if made at ground-level.

Although the amount of time people have spent in motion has remained constant since 1950, the shift from feet and bicycles to cars and planes has increased the speed of travel fivefold. This results in the twin effects of wider, and shallower regions of social activity around each person (further exacerbated by electronic communication which can be seen as a form of virtual mobility), and a degradation of the social and physical environment brought about by the high speed traffic (as theorised by urban designer Donald Appleyard).

The changes are brought about locally due to the use of cars and motorways, and internationally by aeroplanes. Some of the social threats of hypermobility include:

- Increased polarisation between rich and poor
- Reduced health and fitness

Compulsive travel has been proposed as a model of addiction in one paper.

Widespread Internet use is seen as a contributory factor towards hypermobility due to the increased ease which it enables travel to be desired and organized. On the other hand, the proliferation of online communication tools as an alternative to in-person meetings has been linked to a 25% decrease in business travel by UK residents from 2000 to 2010.

The term hypermobility arose around 1980 concerning the flow of capital, and since the early 1990s has also referred to excessive travel. [See: Hepworth and Ducatel (1992); Whitelegg (1993); Lowe (1994); van der Stoep (1995); Shields (1996); Cox (1997); Adams (1999); Khisty and Zeitler (2001); Gössling et al. (2009); Mander & Randles (2009); and (Higham 2014).] The term is widely credited as having been coined by Adams (1999), but apart from the title of the work it says nothing explicit about it except that "[t]he term hypermobility is used in this essay to suggest that it may be possible to have too much of a good thing."

== See also ==
- Dromomania – Historical psychiatric diagnosis
- Environmental impact of aviation – Effect of emissions from aircraft engines
- Pareto principle – Statistical principle about ratio of effects to causes
