= Forth =

Forth or FORTH may refer to:

== Arts and entertainment ==
- forth magazine, an Internet magazine
- Forth (album), by The Verve, 2008
- Forth, a 2011 album by Proto-Kaw
- Radio Forth, a group of independent local radio stations in Scotland

== People ==
- Eric Forth (1944–2006), British politician
- Frederick Forth (1808–1876), British colonial administrator
- Hugh Forth (1610–1676), English politician
- Jane Forth (born 1953), American actress and model
- John Forth (c. 1769 – 1848), British jockey and racehorse trainer
- Lisette Denison Forth (c. 1786 – 1866), American slave who became a landowner and philanthropist
- Tasman Forth, pen name of Alexander Rud Mills (1885–1964), Australian Odinist

== Places ==
- Forth, Tasmania, Australia
- Forth, Eckental, Germany
- Forth, South Lanarkshire, Scotland
- River Forth, Scotland
- River Forth (Tasmania), Australia
- Forth (County Carlow barony), Ireland
- Forth (County Wexford barony), Ireland
- Forth (Edinburgh ward), Scotland

== Ships ==
- HMS Forth, the name of several ships of the Royal Navy
- Forth (1814 ship), a sailing ship built at Calcutta, British India
- Forth (1826 ship), a sailing ship built at Leith, Scotland

== Other uses ==
- Forth (programming language)
- Foundation for Research & Technology – Hellas, a research centre in Greece

== See also ==
- Fort (disambiguation)
- Fourth (disambiguation)
- Sally Forth (disambiguation)
- Firth of Forth, an estuary in Scotland
  - Islands of the Forth
