= Fourth =

Fourth or the fourth may refer to:

- the ordinal form of the number 4
- One fourth, 1/4, a fraction, one of four equal parts of a whole
- Fourth (album), by Soft Machine, 1971
- Fourth (angle), an ancient astronomical subdivision
- Fourth (music), a musical interval
- The Fourth, a 1972 Soviet drama

== Places ==
- 4th meridian east, a line of longitude extending through Europe and Africa
- 4th meridian west, a line of longitude extending through Europe and Africa
- 4th parallel north, a circle of latitude above the Equator
- 4th parallel south, a circle of latitude below the Equator
- 4th Street (disambiguation)
- Fourth Avenue (disambiguation)

== Time ==
- 4th century
- 4th century BC

=== Dates ===
- Fourth of the month, a recurring calendar date
  - Fourth of January
  - Fourth of February
  - Fourth of March
  - Fourth of April
  - Fourth of May
  - Fourth of June
  - Fourth of July
  - Fourth of August
  - Fourth of September
  - Fourth of October
  - Fourth of November
  - Fourth of December

== See also ==
- 1/4 (disambiguation)
- 4 (disambiguation)
- Fourth Amendment (disambiguation)
- The fourth part of the world (disambiguation)
- Forth (disambiguation)
- Quarter (disambiguation)
- Independence Day (United States), or The Fourth of July
- Star Wars Day, or May the Fourth
- 4th Newtownabbey F.C.
