= Gordon Ramsay Plane Food =

Restaurant in Heathrow Airport Terminal 5

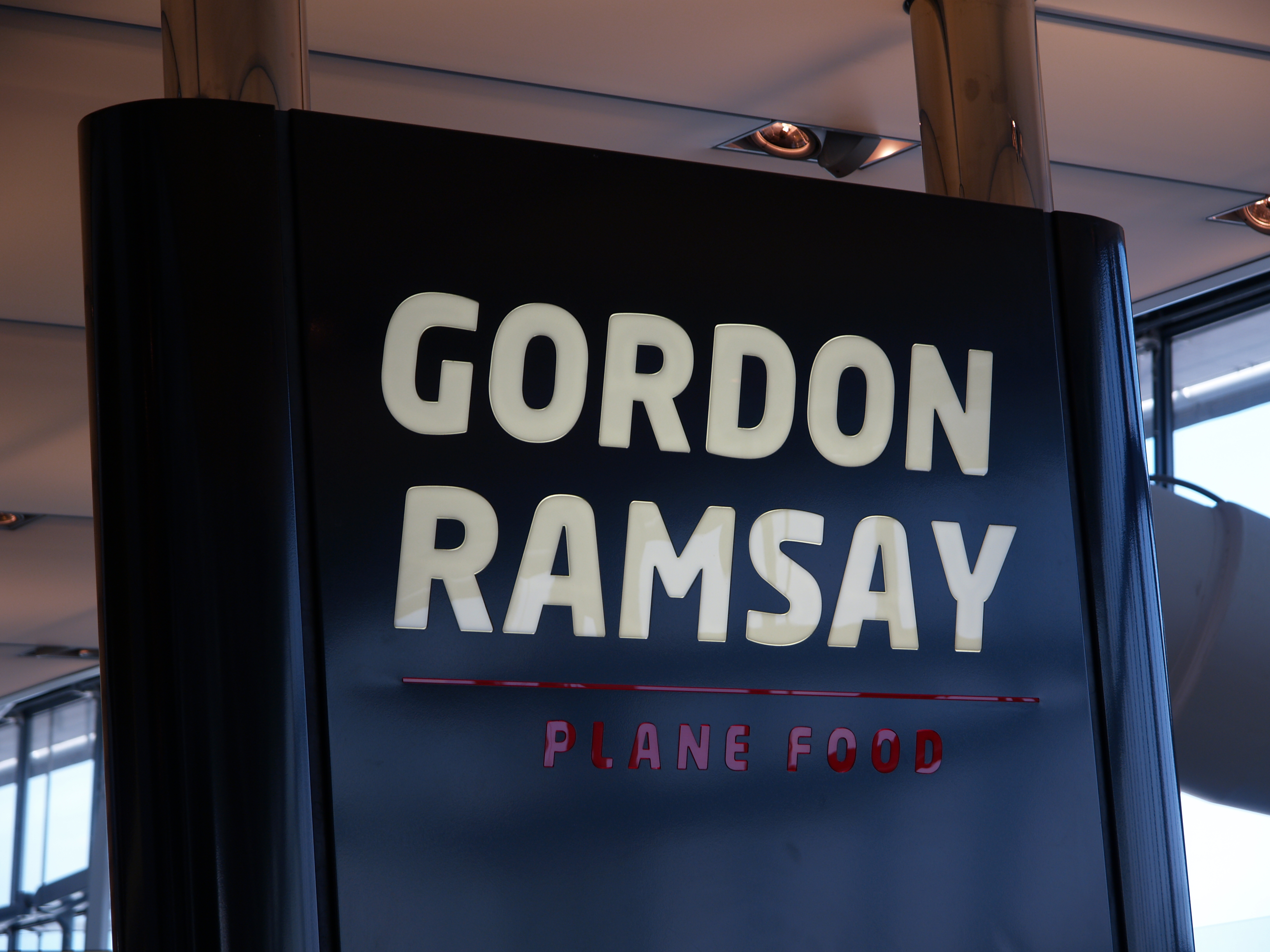
- The sign outside the entrance to Gordon Ramsay Plane Food

- The location of the restaurant within Greater London

Restaurant information
- Established: 27 March 2008; 18 years ago
- Owner: Gordon Ramsay
- Head chef: Andrew Winstanley
- Chef: Gordon Ramsay
- Food type: European cuisine
- Location: Heathrow Terminal 5, England
- Coordinates: 51.47278°N 0.48756°W
- Seating capacity: 175
- Website: London - Hong Kong

Gordon Ramsay Plane Food is a restaurant owned by chef Gordon Ramsay, located within Heathrow Airport Terminal 5 in London, United Kingdom. The restaurant cost £2.5 million to build and is located within the airside area of the airport. It opened in 2008 alongside the rest of Terminal 5, and with several other Ramsay-related openings that year. Ramsay said that he aimed to keep the menu lean without the use of heavy sauces, and menus are also offered for quick dining as well as takeaway cool boxes which contain a three course meal to be eaten on a plane.

Critics have been mostly positive, although one initial poor review by Jan Moir was picked up by the mainstream media. The concept of the cool boxes was also praised. It was Ramsay's first airport-based restaurant, and in 2013 he announced that he was planning to take the concept to a number of airports within the United States.

== Description ==
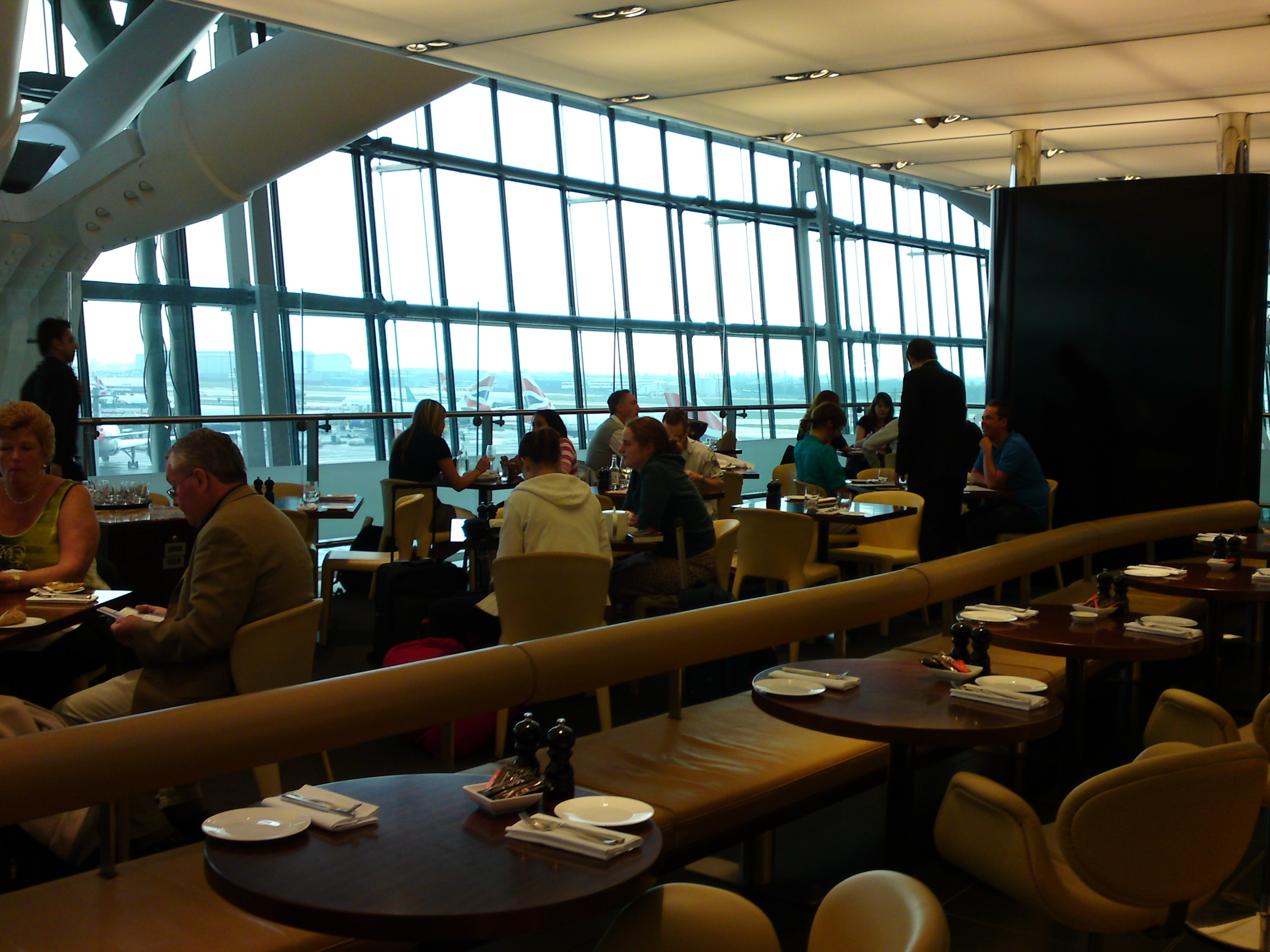
The interior of Gordon Ramsay Plane Food

Gordon Ramsay Plane Food is located on the sixth floor of Terminal 5 within Heathrow Airport, London, next to the Wagamama restaurant. It is airside, meaning that the restaurant is only accessible to passengers who have passed through security. The restaurant cost £2.5 million to set up, and Ramsay signed an initial lease for ten years with the airport. The chef patron of the restaurant is Stuart Giles, who had previously worked at Ramsay's Boxwood Cafe. Since September 2015 the executive chef is Andrew Winstanley.

The interior is decorated with a marble bar, above which hangs a painting by Barnaby Gorton worth £90,000. There are large windows at one end of the restaurant, which look out onto the airport itself. The restaurant has a seating capacity for 175 diners.

As with all restaurants at Terminal 5, Plane Food cannot use gas equipment due to safety reasons and so electric ovens and hobs are used instead as well as a single microwave. The cutlery is also a standard airport size so that the knives cannot be used as weapons. Ramsay requires that staff who are working at Plane Food must gain work experience in another one of his restaurants first.

=== Menu ===
Pricing is similar to other restaurants owned by Ramsay, and it is intended to bring a fine dining experience out of specialist airport lounges and make it available to any traveller. Starters include a pea, leek, and goat cheese tart, while mains include sea bass which is steamed and served alongside lemongrass and white asparagus. Chocolate fondue with marshmallows and waffles are among the options for dessert as well as a knickerbocker glory. Traditional fine dining dishes are also included on the menu, such as Sevruga caviar. Ramsay said in interviews around the launch of the restaurant that he aimed to keep "it all very lean, lean, lean. No heavy sauces". He compared the menu to a cross between The Ivy, his own Boxwood Cafe and The Wolseley. A specific menu is offered for quick dining, called "Plane Fast". This has multiple-course meals which aim to be served within 25 minutes.

== History ==
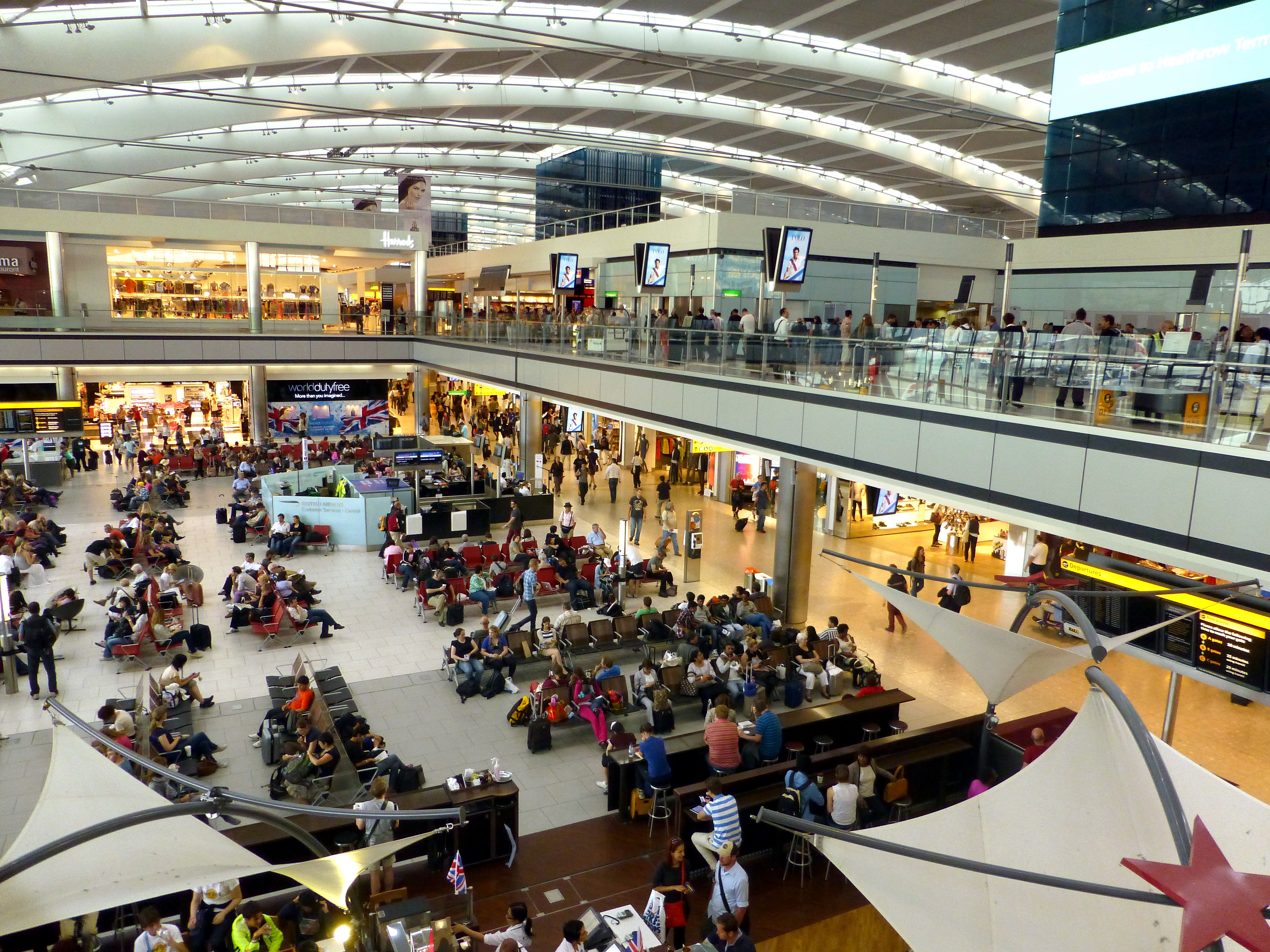
Heathrow Terminal 5 was opened on 27 March 2008.

Plane Food was announced in December 2007 to launch upon the opening of Heathrow Airport's new Terminal 5 on 27 March 2008. It was Gordon Ramsay's ninth restaurant opening in London, and his first in an airport. It was opened around the same time as Ramsay's first restaurant in France, Gordon Ramsay au Trianon, located within the Palace of Versailles. He also expanded his restaurant empire in other areas during 2008, with Murano (alongside Angela Hartnett), York & Albany and Maze Grill also opening. Partly due to the delays in opening the terminal, the restaurant had a loss of £780,767 during the first year.

During 2009, Ramsay had financial issues with tax payments. A liquidation petition was placed by HM Revenue & Customs against Plane Food, Maze, Restaurant Gordon Ramsay and The Narrow. He was given two weeks to pay the tax debts accumulated by Plane Food. It was announced on 10 December that he had achieved this and the restaurant remained open. His 2010 opening, Bread Street Kitchen, was based on the same concept as Plane Food, as its location within the One New Change office and retail development created a similar need to cater for quick dining and a high volume of single diners.

In 2013, Ramsay announced that he planned to expand the Plane Food concept to several sites in the United States including O'Hare International Airport in Chicago, and airports at Los Angeles, Las Vegas and New York. A partnership was also formed during that year with No.1 Traveller to provide a lounge experience within Terminal 5 for passengers. While the wider plans to include American airports never came to fruition, in December 2019 a Gordon Ramsay Plane Food To Go location opened up in Terminal 1 of the Hong Kong International Airport. In early January 2022, the Hong Kong location was "temporarily closed" due to COVID pandemic-related restrictions, but re-opened by mid-September 2022.

== Reception ==
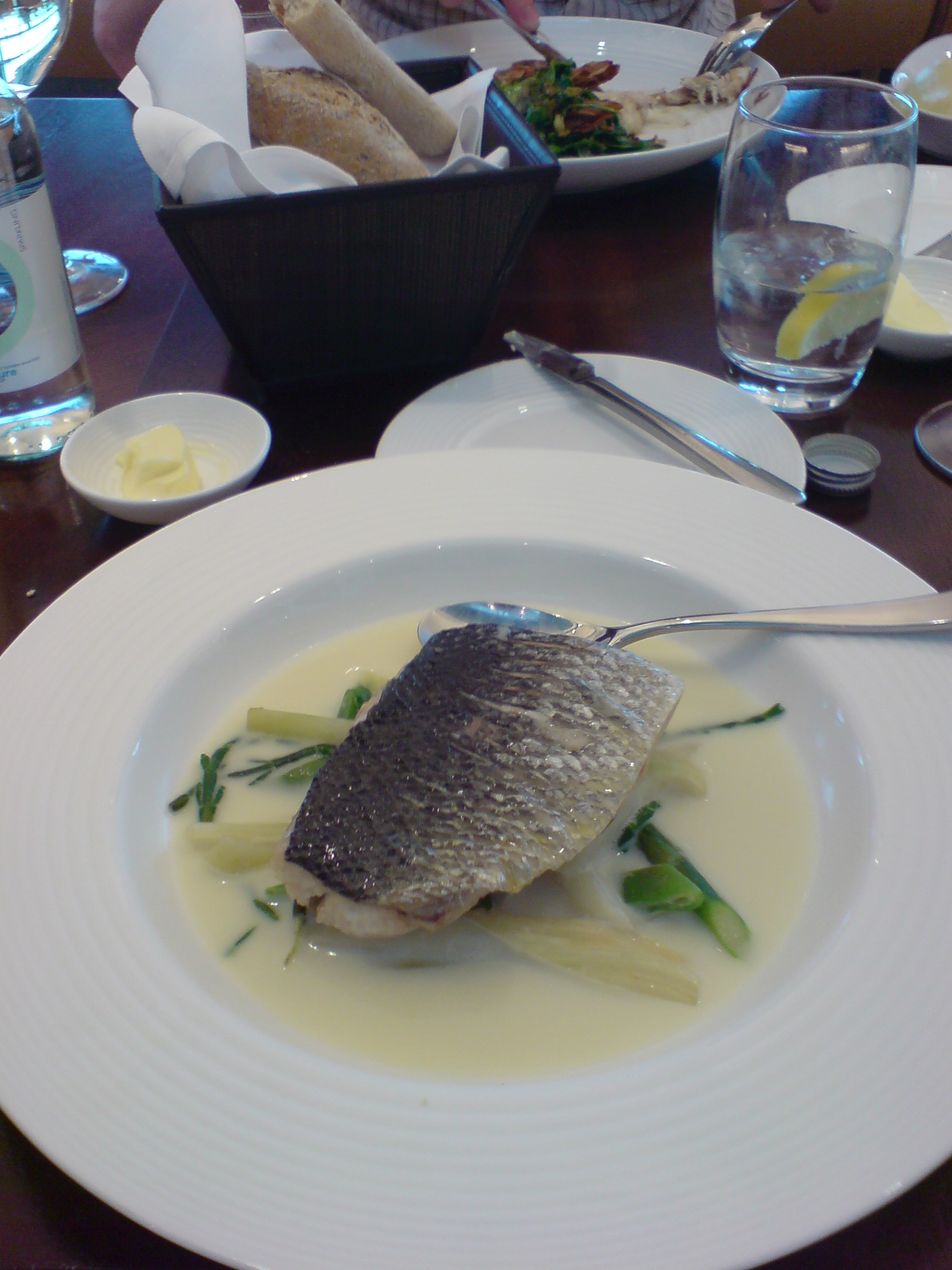
A sea bream dish served at Plane Food

Food critic Jan Moir was the first to review the restaurant after opening, after some five hours on the first day. She did not think that the quality of the food was enough to attract first and executive class passengers. Moir was also concerned that the pricing was too expensive for those travelling in economy. She said that the required use of electric stoves instead of gas resulted in her steak resembling a "parched leather shoe rotting in the rain". Jasper Gerard, in his review for The Daily Telegraph said that he enjoyed the caviar and the sea bass dishes, but did not like the vegetable accompaniments. He criticised negative reviews of the restaurant, saying "Are they comparing like with like? Heathrow will never be Royal Hospital Ro[ad], Ramsay's Chelsea nosh house, but it's hardly a kitchen nightmare".

Tam Cowan also reviewed it shortly after opening for the Daily Record. He gave it a score of 20 out of 25, finding it difficult to believe that food of such good quality was being served inside an airport. He called a macaroni gratin with mushrooms and Parmigiano-Reggiano cheese "fantastic" and said that an apple crumble was "awesome". Mark Bollard, in his review of the restaurant for the Evening Standard in 2009, was not expecting much from the restaurant. However, he called his Caesar salad starter a "revelation" and said that the chocolate brownie was "dense, dark and rich". Although he was disappointed with the polenta chips, he said overall that the food was "utterly sublime" and he suggested that Ramsay should expand the concept to railway stations across London. In 2012, John Walsh wrote about Jamie Oliver's restaurant at Gatwick Airport, saying that Ramsay's Plane Food had "pioneered the concept of non-revolting airport food".

Chris Haslam reviewed a number of in-flight meal options on various airlines as well as Plane Food in an article for the Sunday Times. He gave it a score of 7 out of 10, saying about the takeaway cool boxes that "as long as it lasts, it's like being in business class".
