= Fourth Avenue =

Fourth Avenue or 4 Av may refer to:

- Fourth Avenue (Manhattan) or Park Avenue
- Fourth Avenue (Brooklyn)
- Fourth Avenue (Pittsburgh)
- 4 Av, the fourth day of Av, the fifth month of the Hebrew calendar

== See also ==
- Fourth Avenue Building (disambiguation)
- Fourth Avenue Historic District (disambiguation)
- Fourth Avenue Line (disambiguation)
