= Quarter =

A quarter is one-fourth, 1/4, 25%, or 0.25.

Quarter or quarters may refer to:

== Places ==
- Quarter (urban subdivision), a section or area, usually of a town

=== Placenames ===
- Quarter, South Lanarkshire, a settlement in Scotland
- Le Quartier, a settlement in France
- The Quarter, Anguilla
- Quartier, Sud, Haiti

== Arts, entertainment, and media ==
- Quarters (children's game) or bloody knuckles, a schoolyard game involving quarters or other coins
- Quarters (game), a drinking game
- Quarters!, a 2015 album by the psychedelic rock group King Gizzard and the Lizard Wizard
- Quarter note, in music one quarter of a whole note
- "Quarters" (Wilco song)
- "Quarter" (song)
- Quarter (film), an American coming-of-age comedy-drama

== Coins ==
- Quarter (Canadian coin), valued at one-fourth of a Canadian dollar
- Quarter (United States coin), valued at one-fourth of a U.S. dollar
  - Washington quarter, the current design of this coin
- Quarter farthing, an archaic British monetary unit
- Quarter dollar, 1/4 unit of currencies that are named dollar
- Quarter guinea, a British coin

== Military ==
- General quarters, a naval status requiring all hands to go to battle stations
- Barracks or quarters, buildings built to house military personnel or laborers
- Quarter, a promise or guarantee of mercy to a vanquished enemy; see Safe conduct and no quarter

== Time ==
- Academic quarter (class timing), term used by universities in various European countries for the 15 minutes between the defined start time for a lecture and the actual time it will start
- Academic quarter (year division), a division of an academic year lasting from 8 to 12 weeks
- Quarter days, in British and Irish tradition, one of four dates in each year on which rents, etc. were due
- Quarter (calendar year), one of four divisions of a calendar year or fiscal year (q.v.)

== Other uses ==
- Quarter (unit), various obsolete customary units of measurement
- Quarters of nobility or quarterings, the number of generations in which noble status has been held by a family
- Hanged, drawn and quartered, formerly a punishment for treason in England
- Quarter (heraldry)
- William Quarter (1806–1848)
- Lunar phase - Shape of the Moon's sunlit portion as viewed from Earth, sometimes called the quarters.

== See also ==
- 1/4 (disambiguation)
- Fourth (disambiguation)
- No quarter (disambiguation)
- The Quarters (disambiguation)
- QTR (disambiguation)
- Quart (disambiguation)
- Quarterdeck (disambiguation)
- Quartering (disambiguation)
- Quartet (disambiguation)
- Quarterly, a magazine published four times a year
- Quartiere, a subdivision of certain Italian towns
- Quartier (unit), an obsolete French unit of measurement
- Quartile, a term in statistics
- Shoe (The back and rearward sides of a shoe are called quarters)
