= Kool Skools =

Kool Skools is a multimedia and recording project for secondary school students across the Australian states of Victoria and New South Wales. The projects are open to all secondary schools, council youth agencies and youth clubs. Kool Skools promotes, develops and supports a diverse range of talent and genres of contemporary music. Participants of Kool Skools have the opportunity to work within a professional recording environment to record and package an album of music. At the end of each year an awards night is held where participants have the opportunity to perform some of their songs and are recognised for their work throughout the year.

== High profile participants with professional releases, most available on Spotify ==
- Missy Higgins
- Delta Goodrem
- Tom Ugly (band name [is]
- Anthony Callea
- The Cat Empire (group)
- Dean Geyer
- Casey Donovan
- Axle Whitehead
- White Summer
- The Mellows
- Say Please
- The Quarters
- Shane Price
- Tim Wheatley
- Natasha Duarte
- Marc Collis
- Plunja / The Whiteroom
- Anna Leeworthy (previously Anna Mannering)
- Jordie Lane
- Kelebek - (previously Nessa Mae) (X-Factor)
- Andrew James Christie (Bleeding Fingers Music / Hans Zimmer Productions)
- James Phillips (aka Jaymz Phillips) Bushido Band
- Ben Edgar
- Simon Bruce
- Axle Whitehead
- Jourdain Wongtrakun (Urban Zoo)
- Cooper Lower
- Jess Pollard
- ALZZY (Alyssa Allen)
- Erin Finlay
- Georgia Scofield
- Stella Farnan
- Daniel Cropley
- Rory O'Donnell
- Messed Up Moose
- Coby Demaria
- Shewolf
- Nyssa Bradsworth
- Abby Fuller
- Briana Lee
- Revival Nona
- Ella Freestone
- Charli Liligan
- Zygotic (Luke Hemmens)
- The Cat Empire
- Nancie Schipper
- Tash Eloise
- Katie Weston
- Boyracer
- The Quarters
- Robert Baxter
- Amaya Laucirica
- Bianca Berto (The Razz)
- Brydie Lanyon
- Joshua Vale
- Sadie Musto
- The Viceroys
- Jeremiah Johnston
- Soldiers Road
- Laylah Baines
- Mikayla King
- AMA Band

== JB HiFi Music Prize Recipients ==
2007: The Heave (NSW)

2007: [is] Featuring Tom Ugly

2008: Bad Day's Goodnight featuring Natasha Duarté (NSW)

2008: Zygotic (NSW)

2009: Unsafe Thort (VIC)

2009: No Pressure (NSW)

2010: The Kalaharis (VIC)

2010: The Chestnuts (NSW)

2011: The Razz (VIC) featuring Bianca Berto

2011: Jeff (NSW)

2012: Kelebek (NSW) (aka Nessa Mae)

2013: Natasha Eloise (NSW) (Aka Tash Eloise)

2013: Bonney Ranch (VIC)

2014: The Mellows (VIC)

2014: SheWolf (VIC)

2015: Cooper Lower (VIC)

== Koolest Skool Award winners ==
=== Victoria ===
- 2026: TBA in November 2026
- 2025: Mill Park SC
- 2024: Coburg High School
- 2023: Heathdale Secondary College
- 2022: Mount Lilydale Mercy College
- 2021: Awards This year was cancelled due to the Covid 19 Pandemic
- 2020: Awards This year was cancelled due to the Covid 19 Pandemic
- 2019: Victory Christian College
- 2018: Mount Lilydale Mercy College
- 2017: Mill Park Secondary College
- 2016: Mount Lilydale Mercy College
- 2015: Mill Park Secondary College
- 2014: Emmanuel College, Warrnambool
- 2013: Thomastown SC
- 2012: Notre Dame College
- 2011: Albury Youth Cafe (a combination of Albury/Wodonga schools)
- 2010: Copperfield College
- 2009: Thomastown Secondary College
- 2008: Noble Park Secondary College
- 2007: Notre Dame College
- 2006: Geelong Grammar
- 2005: Notre Dame College
- 2004: Thomastown Secondary College
- 2003: Pakenham Secondary College
- 2002: Wangaratta High School
- 2001: Heathdale Christian College
- 2000: East Gippsland Schools, including Lakes Entrance and Bairnsdale
- 1999: Wangaratta High School
- 1998: Billanook College
- 1997: Swinburne Snr Secondary College

=== New South Wales ===
- 2023; Project Pending Reinstatement post Covid 19 Interruption
- 2021: Cancelled year due to Covid 19 Pandemic
- 2020: Cancelled year due to Covid 19 Pandemic
- 2019: Cancelled due to Sydney Studio closure
- 2018: Canterbury Girls High School
- 2017: Canterbury Girls High School
- 2016: Mackellar Girls Campus
- 2015: Mackellar Girls Campus
- 2014: St Andrews College
- 2013: N/A
- 2012: N/A
- 2011: Brisbane Water Secondary College
- 2010: Fairfield City Council, Bring It On Festival
- 2009: Brisbane Waters Secondary College
- 2008: Manly Council Youth Services
- 2007: Brisbane Water Secondary College
- 2006: Loseby Park Youth Centre
- 2005: Mackellar Girls Campus
- 2004: (not held in NSW in 2004)
- 2003: Brisbane Water Secondary College
- 2002: Brisbane Water Secondary College
- 2001: Prairiewood Languages High School
- 2000: Port Hacking High School

== Recording Studios Involved ==
=== Melbourne, Victoria ===
- Studio 52 1997–2019
- Empire Music Studios (previously Studio 52, new facilities at Heidelberg West, VIC) - 2019 onwards

=== Sydney, NSW ===
- Velvet Sound 2000 - 2004
- Troy Horse Studios 2005 - 2010
- Megaphon Studios 2011 - 2016
- Music Feeds Studios 2017 - 2018

=== Hobart, Tasmania ===
- Red Planet. 2003 - 2006

=== Adelaide, SA ===
- Fat Trax 2003 - 2005
- Mixmasters, Adelaide city based studio. 2006

=== Brisbane & GC, QLD ===
- Gingerman Studios - Brian Cadd's Gold Coast home studio
- Troy Horse Brisbane

=== Perth, WA ===
- Initially booked for the famous Planet Studios but didn't go ahead due to the studio fire which destroyed the studio prior to any projects confirmed
