= Post box topper =

Needlework public decor for special occasion of UK

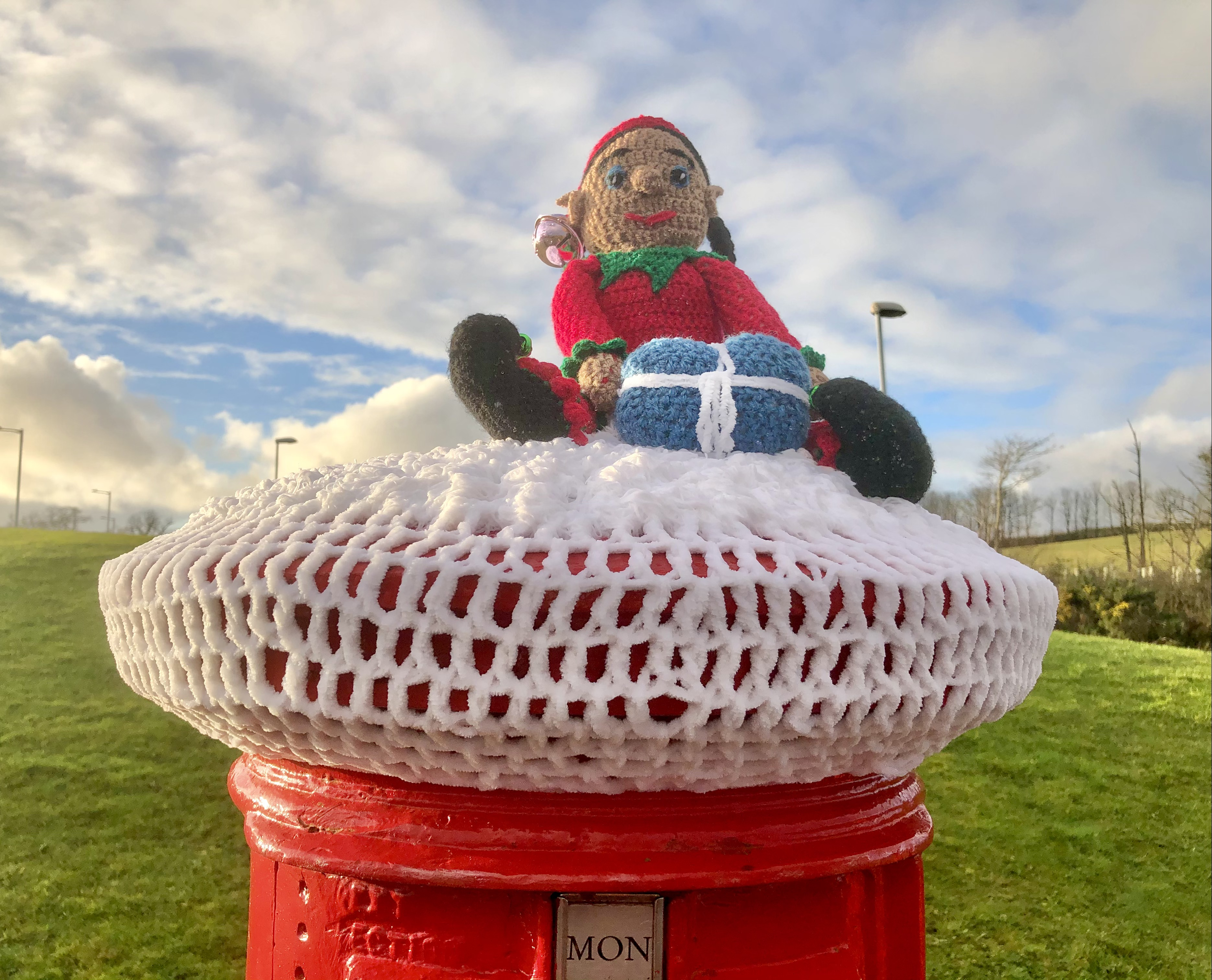
A crocheted Christmas post box topper at Inverkip, Scotland, December 2020.

A post box topper is any display of crafting placed on top of a pillar box or other style of post box for public enjoyment. In the United Kingdom they are often designed as a tribute or commemoration, and have been used to pay tribute to NHS workers during the coronavirus pandemic, for Elizabeth II's Platinum Jubilee, and in September 2022 as a tribute upon her death. Seasonal toppers for Christmas and other events are popular, and although toppers are often crochet or knitted, many other crafts are also used.

In June 2021, the Warrington Guardian reported that "yarn bombers" had placed numerous toppers or bonnets on post boxes in the area to mark local events or connections.

A spokesperson for Royal Mail said "We first began to see these toppers in 2012 over the festive season, although this soon spread to other key times of the year such as Easter. More recently, we have noticed decorations celebrating various frontline workers during the pandemic, including postal workers."

On Christmas Day 2022, a knitted post box topper created by a woman using the pseudonym Syston Knitting Banxy appeared on an edition of Coronation Street.

In March 2023, Daily Mail journalist Jan Moir branded those who make post box toppers as "Woolly Delinquents," a label that the topper community, also known as "Yarn Bombers", has embraced.

== Gallery ==
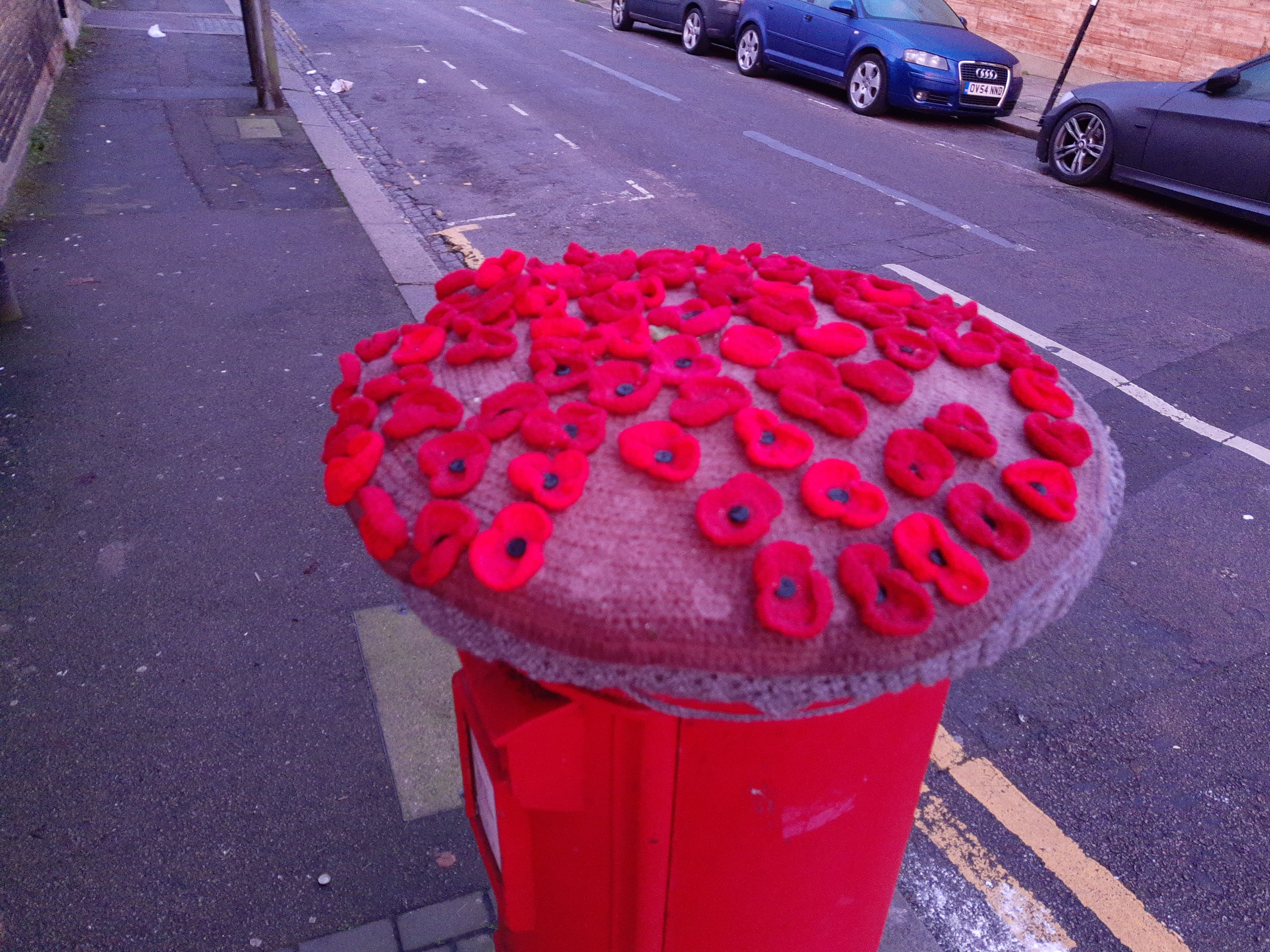
Knitted Remembrance poppies in Walthamstow, Greater London, 2020

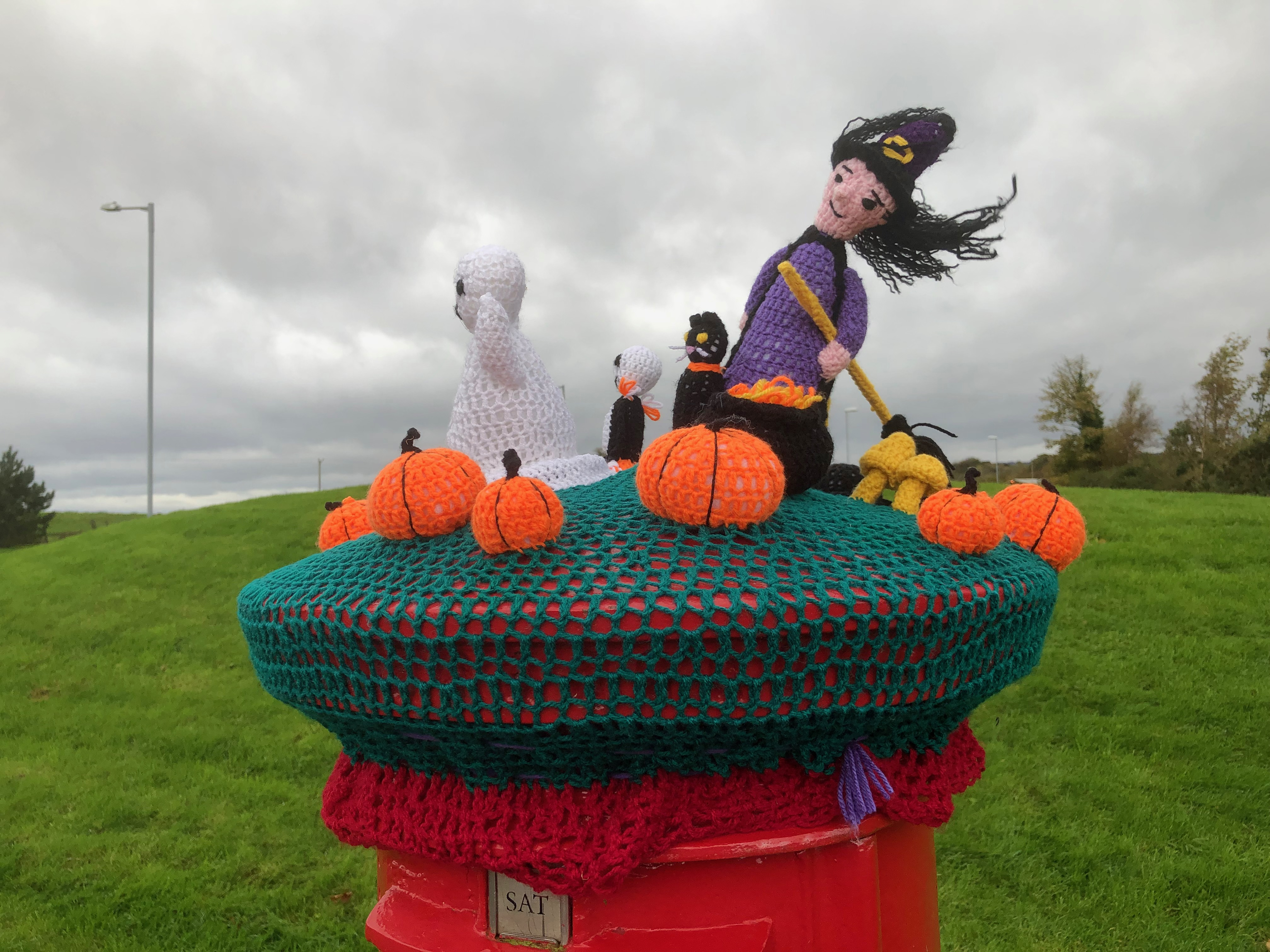
Halloween topper in Inverkip, Inverclyde, 2021

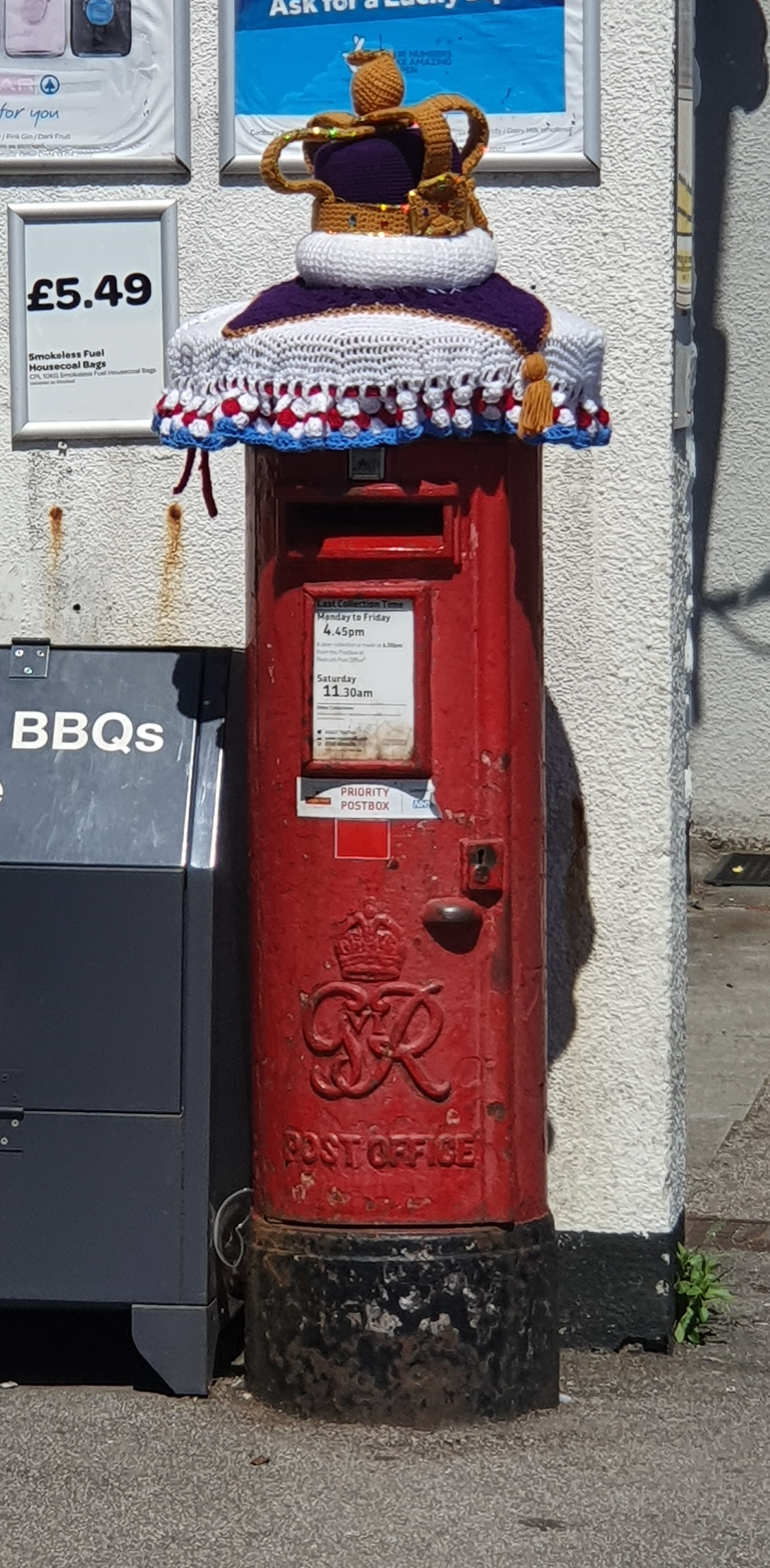
Platinum Jubilee crown in Pool, Cornwall, 2022

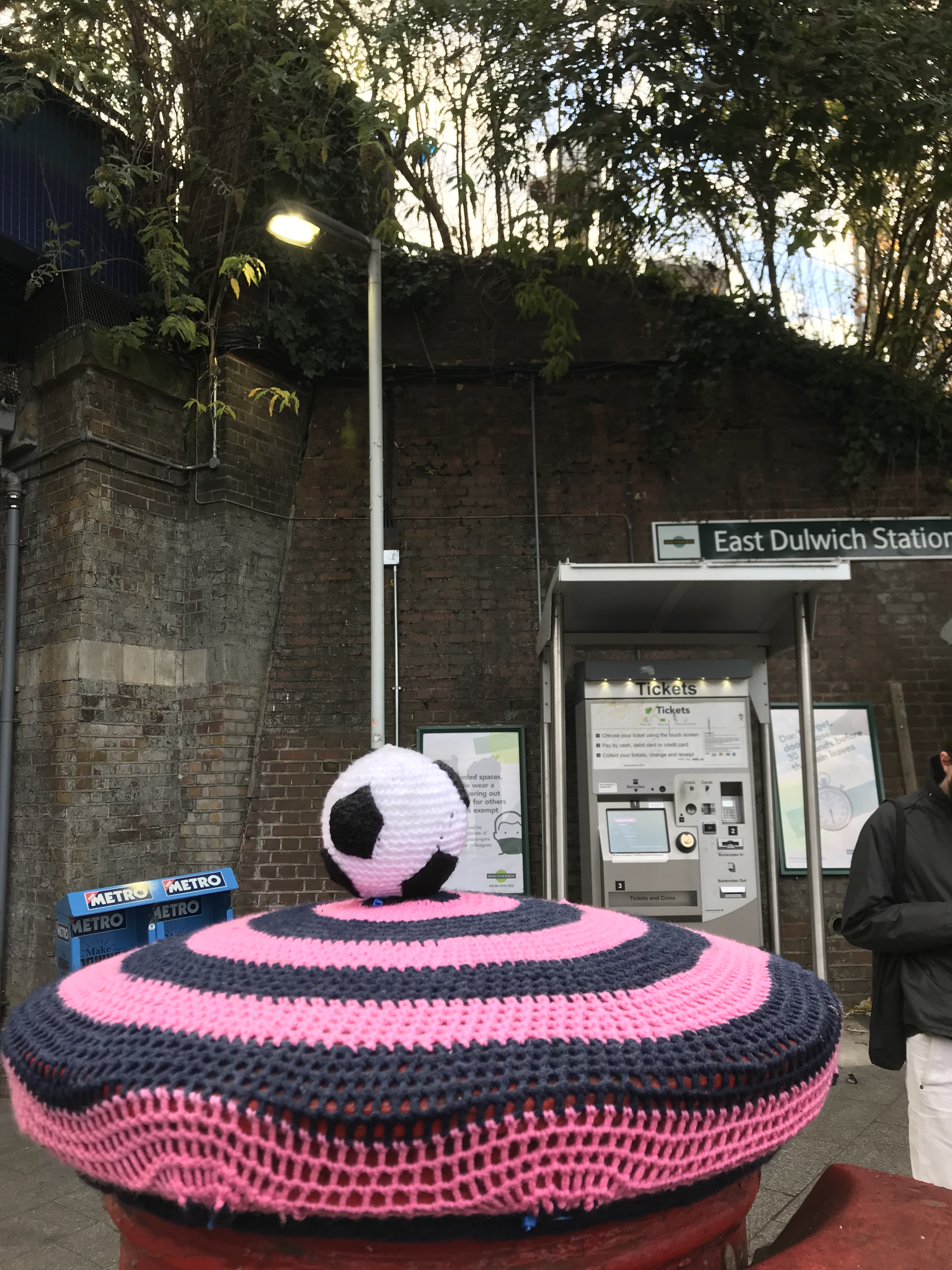
A football to celebrate England women's national football team winning the UEFA Women's Euro 2022 final, East Dulwich, Greater London, 2022

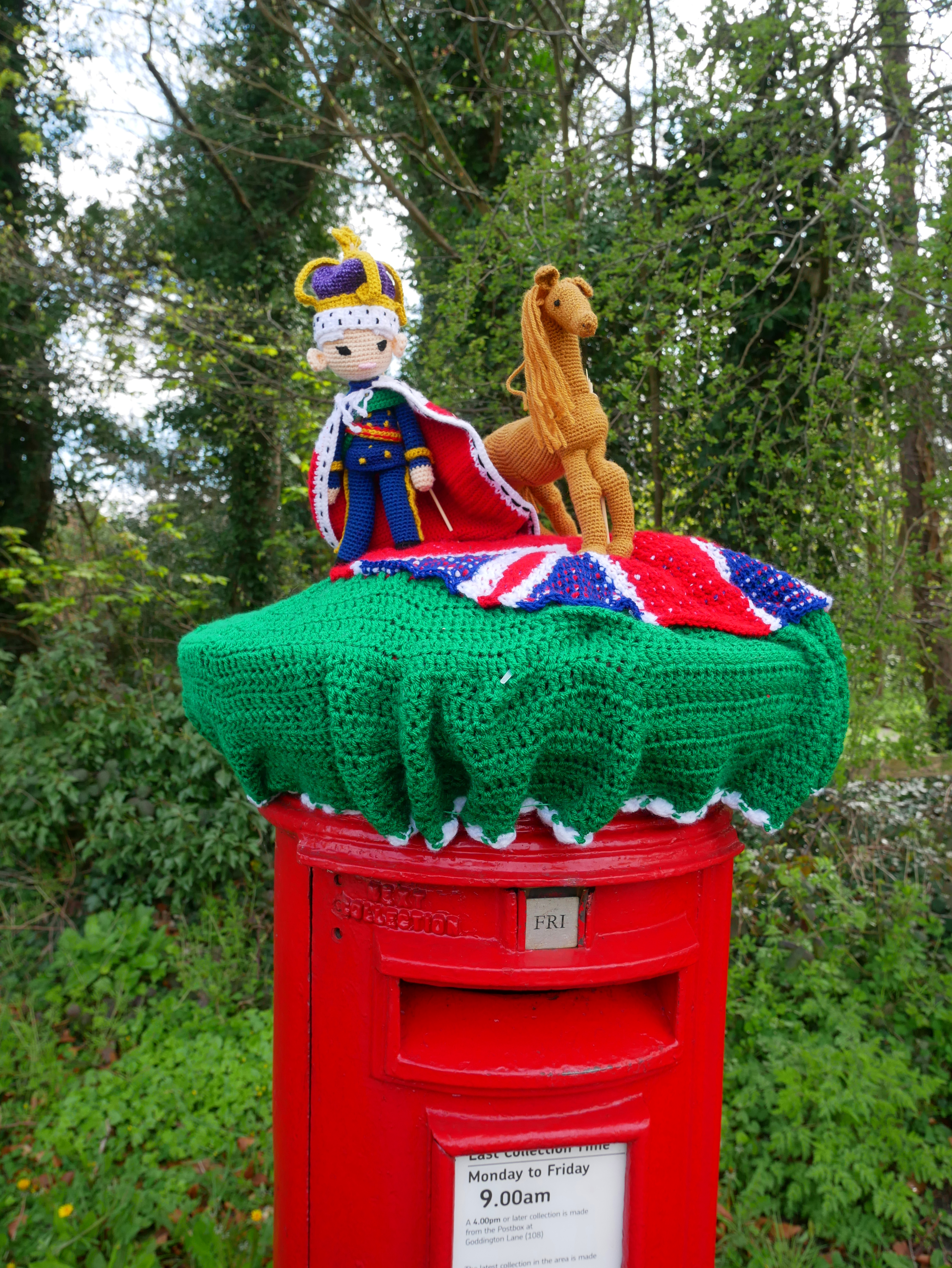
Depiction of Charles III for his coronation, Godalming, Surrey, 2023.

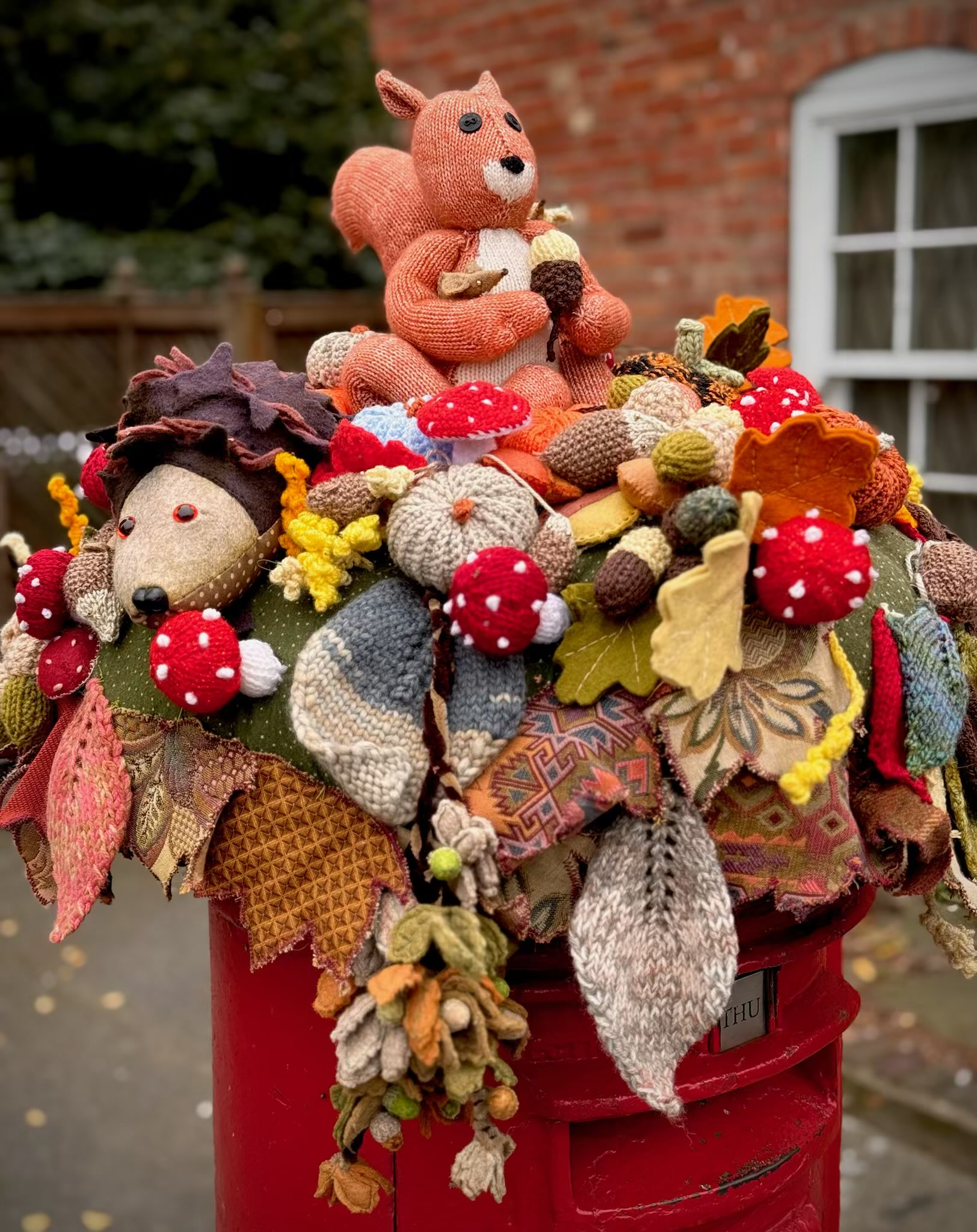
An elaborate post box topper in Collingham, Nottinghamshire at the arrival of autumn.
