= 1/4 =

1/4 or 1/4 or ¼ may refer to:

- The calendar date January 4, in month-day format
- The calendar date 1 April in day-month format
- 1st Battalion, 4th Marines, an infantry battalion in the US Marine Corps
- A fraction of one fourth, one quarter, 25% or 0.25
- 1/4 (single album), by South Korean band Onewe

== See also ==
- Fourth (disambiguation)
- Quarter (disambiguation)
- Number Forms, a Unicode block containing characters that have specific meaning as numbers
