= Heathrow Terminal 5 =

Airport terminal at London Heathrow Airport

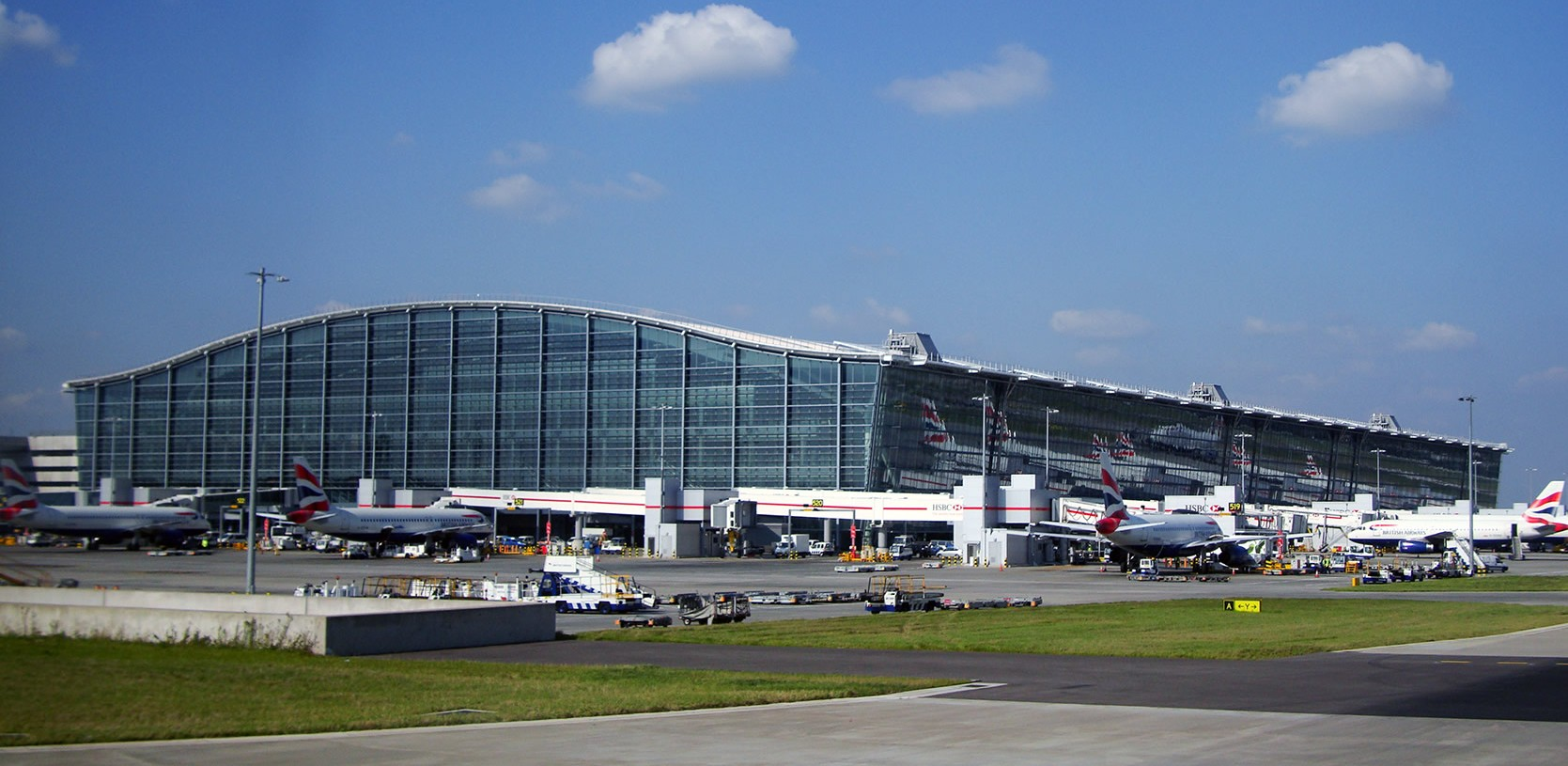
- Terminal 5A exterior

- Location within Greater London
- Alternative names: Terminal 5, British Airways Terminal 5, T5

General information
- Status: Completed
- Type: Airport terminal
- Location: Junction 14 of the M25 off the A3044, Harmondsworth, Hounslow, TW6 2GA
- Coordinates: 51.47278°N 0.48756°W
- Elevation: 22 m (72 ft)
- Construction started: September 2002
- Completed: 2008
- Opened: 27 March 2008
- Inaugurated: 14 March 2008
- Cost: £4.2 billion
- Owner: Heathrow Airport Holdings

Technical details
- Structural system: Steel frame roof with glass facades
- Floor area: 353,020 m^{2} (3,799,900 sq ft) (main terminal building), 18,500 m^{2} (199,000 sq ft) (retail area)

Design and construction
- Architect: Richard Rogers
- Architecture firm: Richard Rogers Partnership
- Services engineer: Hathaway Roofing Ltd (roof)
- Civil engineer: Arup (above ground), Mott MacDonald (substructures)
- Main contractor: Mace, AMEC, Laing O'Rourke, Morgan Vinci JV (tunnelling)

Other information
- Public transit: Heathrow Terminal 5 station

Website
- Heathrow Airport

Heathrow Terminal 5 is an airport terminal at Heathrow Airport, the main airport serving London. Opened in 2008, the main building in the complex is the largest free-standing structure in the United Kingdom. Until 2012, the terminal building was used solely by British Airways. It now is used as one of the three global hubs of IAG, served by British Airways and Iberia.

The terminal was designed to handle 30 million passengers a year. In 2018, Terminal 5 handled 32.1 million passengers on 211,000 flights. It was the busiest terminal at the airport, measured both by passenger numbers and flight movements.

The building's leading architects were from the Richard Rogers Partnership and production design was completed by aviation architects Pascall+Watson. The engineers for the structure were Arup and Mott MacDonald. The building cost £4 billion and took almost 20 years from conception to completion, including the longest public inquiry in British history.

== History ==
=== Plans ===
The possibility of a fifth terminal at Heathrow emerged as early as 1982, when there was debate over whether the expansion of Stansted or the expansion of Heathrow (advocated by BA) was the way forward for the UK aviation industry. Planning studies for the terminal began in February 1988 and Richard Rogers Partnership was selected to design the terminal in 1989. Richard Rogers compared his design to the Centre Pompidou, an earlier project that has similar flexibility in its use of space.

BAA formally announced its proposal for construction of Terminal 5 in May 1992, submitting a formal planning application on 17 February 1993. A public inquiry into the proposals began on 16 May 1995 and lasted nearly four years, finally ending on 17 March 1999 after sitting for 525 days. The inquiry, based at the Renaissance Hotel Heathrow, was the longest planning inquiry ever held in the UK. Finally, more than eight years after the initial planning application, Secretary of State for Transport Stephen Byers announced on 20 November 2001 the British government's decision to grant planning permission for the building of a fifth passenger terminal at Heathrow.

=== Construction ===
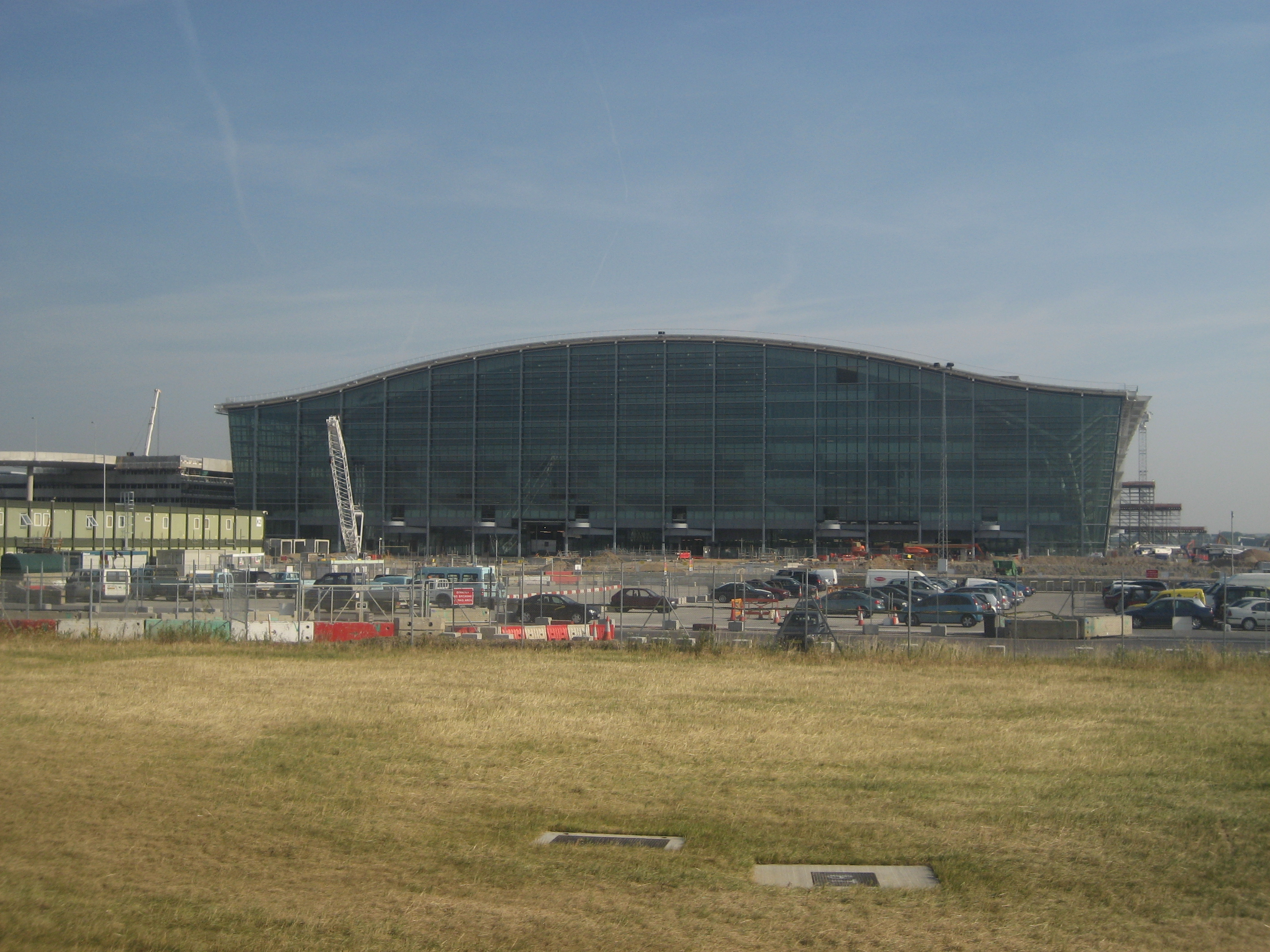
Terminal 5 under construction in July 2006. The frontal car park building can be seen to the left, air side is to the right

Construction, which was undertaken by Laing O'Rourke, began in September 2002, with earthworks for the construction of the buildings' foundation.

A preparatory archaeological dig at the site found more than 80,000 artefacts. Among the artefacts discovered by the archaeological dig include 18,000 pieces of pottery, 40,000 pieces of worked flint, and a wooden bowl dating to the Middle Bronze Age, around 3,000 years ago. Earthworks were also discovered, including a pathway and evidence of agricultural boundaries. Objects recovered from the dig site were immediately analysed and catalogued, allowing for the preparation works for Terminal 5 to occur simultaneously alongside the research being conducted.

In November 2003, work started on the steel superstructure of the main terminal building. By January 2005, the nine tunnels needed to provide road and rail access, and to provide drainage, were completed. In March that year, the sixth and final section of the main terminal roof was lifted into position, and in December the building was made weatherproof. The roof could not have been lifted with conventional cranes because it would have vertically intersected with the airport's radar field. Therefore, the roof was assembled on the ground using smaller cranes, then lifted into place by eight custom-built towers, each fitted with two hydraulic jacks to pull the roof up. At peak there were around 8,000 people working on the construction site, whilst over the life of the project over 60,000 people were involved in the construction. Over 15,000 volunteers were recruited for a total of 68 trials lasting from September 2007 until March 2008 to test the operational readiness of Terminal 5 prior to its opening.

=== Opening ===
Queen Elizabeth II officially opened Terminal 5 in a ceremony on 14 March 2008. Used by British Airways (and now IAG (Iberia)) as well as American Airlines (OneWorld Partner), the terminal opened for passenger use on 27 March 2008, with flight BA26 from Hong Kong its first arrival at 04:50 GMT. The first passenger to enter Terminal 5 was Paul Walker, a UK emigrant from Kenya who entered through security at 04:30 on 27 March 2008 and was presented with a boarding pass by the British Airways CEO Willie Walsh for the first departing flight, BA302 to Paris.

==== Controversy ====
On the day of opening, it quickly became apparent that the new terminal was not operating as planned, forcing British Airways to cancel 34 flights and suspend baggage check-in. Over the following 10 days some 42,000 bags failed to travel with their owners, and over 500 flights were cancelled. British Airways was not able to operate its full schedule from Terminal 5 until 8 April 2008 and had to postpone the transfer of its long-haul flights from Terminal 4 to Terminal 5. The difficulties were later blamed on a number of problems with the terminal's IT systems, coupled with car parking. These resulted in the sacking of BA's director of operations Gareth Kirkwood, and director of customer services David Noyes. Four months after opening, British Airways launched an advertising campaign to assure the public that things were working normally.

== Site ==
=== Overview ===
The Terminal 5 building is on a 260-hectare (640-acre) site on the western side of the airport, between the western ends of the northern and southern runways. The site was previously occupied by the Perry Oaks sewage works and an area of smallholdings called Burrows Hill Close Estate, and is east of the M25 motorway; see also Heathrow (hamlet). Two artificial watercourses, the Longford River and the Duke of Northumberland's River, originally ran through the middle of the site. Most of the terminal is in the ecclesiastical parish of Harmondsworth. The southern section, including the railway station, is in the ecclesiastical parish of Stanwell. The whole area is in the London Borough of Hillingdon.

=== Twin Rivers Diversion Scheme ===
One of the most time-critical civil engineering sub-projects of the Terminal's construction programme was the diversion of the Longford River and Duke of Northumberland's River around the western perimeter of the airport. This was a complex scheme, which involved not only the re-routing of the two rivers but also the realignment of the A3044 dual carriageway and Western Perimeter Road. The challenge was complicated by strict time constraints and the proximity of the works to local residents. Further restrictions to site activities resulted from the overhead flight path from both runways. 95% of the diverted rivers were placed in two open man-made channels 6 kilometres (3.7 mi) in length, compared with only 50% of the original rivers which were conveyed beneath the runways in culverts. The Twin Rivers Diversion scheme achieved a Civil Engineering Environmental Quality (CEEQUAL) Award for its ability to maintain high environmental standards and quality during design and construction of the project. It involved much moving and planting of river wildlife and plants.

== Buildings ==
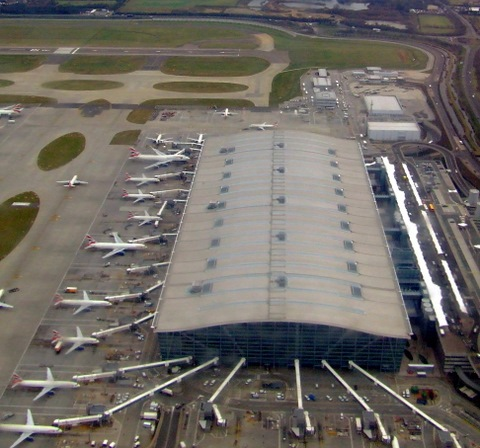
The main building from the air

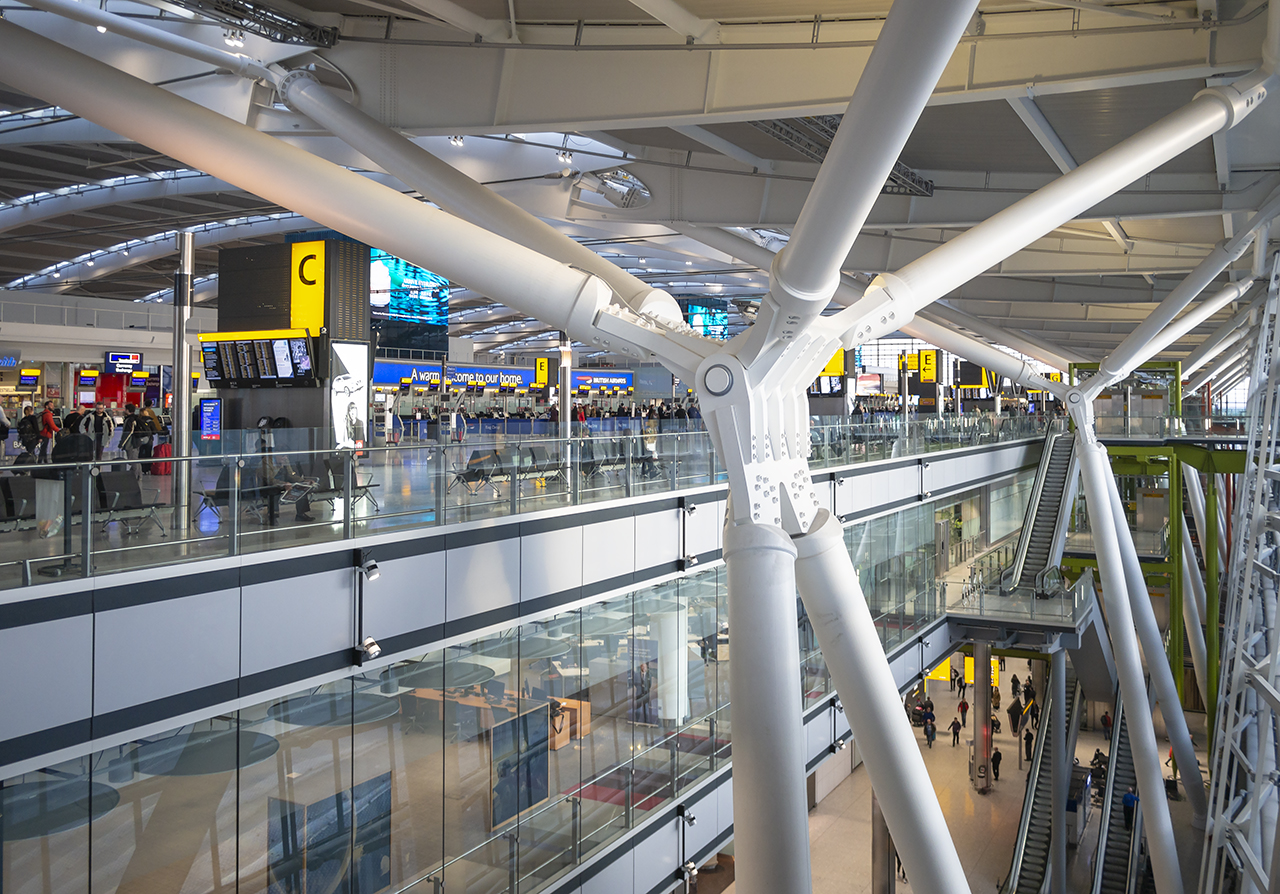
Interior of Heathrow Terminal 5, with check-in visible on the left, and arrivals at bottom right.

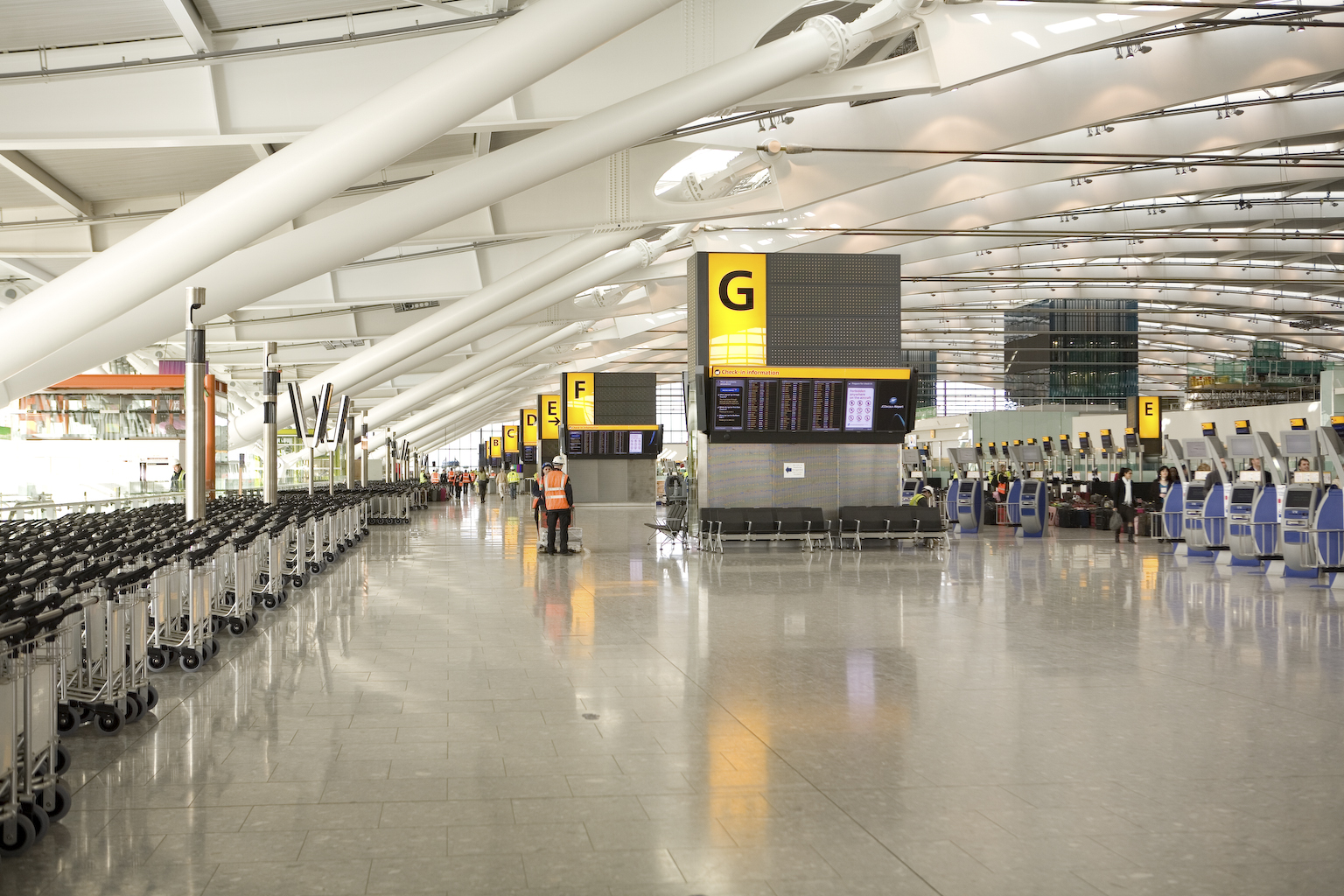
Check-in Area in the main building

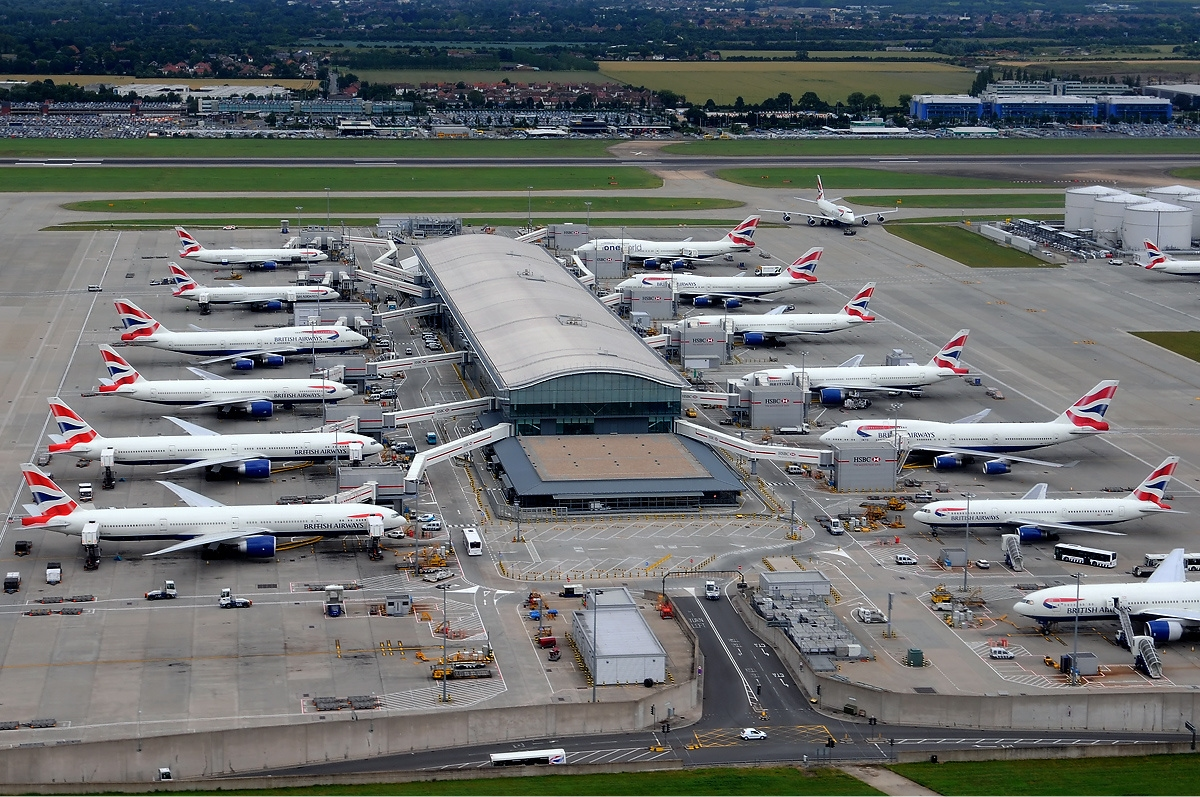
Satellite Terminal 5C

The Terminal 5 complex includes several buildings, a new control tower, and a railway station. The main terminal building is referred to as Terminal 5A. There are two satellite buildings, Terminal 5B and Terminal 5C. At the time of opening, Terminal 5A and Terminal 5B were completed, whilst Terminal 5C, which was built by Carillion, was under construction and scheduled to open later in May 2010; however it only opened in June 2011. The whole complex is fronted by a separate building containing road transport facilities. Within the complex there are more than 100 shops and restaurants.

=== Terminal 5 ===
The main terminal building is 396 metres (1,299 ft) long, 176 metres (577 ft) wide and 40 metres (130 ft) tall. It is the largest building in the Terminal 5 complex and is the largest free-standing building in the United Kingdom. Its four storeys are covered by a single-span undulating steel frame roof, with glass façades angled at 6.5 degrees to the vertical. The area covered by the roof is the size of five football pitches, and each section weighs 2,200 tonnes.

T5A contains a check-in hall, a departure lounge with retail stores and other passenger services, and a baggage reclaim hall. T5A contains the bulk of the terminal's baggage handling system. This baggage handling system is the largest in the world with 5 miles (8.0 km) of high-speed track and 11 miles (18 km) of regular conveyor belts. It is designed to handle 4,000 bags per hour, and also has an "early bag store" which can temporarily store up to 4,000 bags.

Departing passengers enter the departures level on the third floor by lift or escalator from the interchange plaza. Upon entering the departures concourse, passengers see views across Heathrow and the surrounding area, and are in a space that is unobstructed to the rising roof above. After check-in and security screening, the airside departure lounge also provides views across the airport, its runways and beyond. Additional mezzanine levels forming a fourth and fifth level at the north, south and centre of the building contain the British Airways frequent flyer lounges and premium restaurants.

There are 53 gates numbered A1–A23, B32–B48 and C52–C66. All are equipped with jetbridges except for gates A4 and A10 which are coaching gates. A number of jet bridge equipped gates can also be used for coaching departures if required.

British Airways maintains offices overlooking the main Terminal 5 passenger handling areas, designed so that staff can have, in the words of Aviation Transport Weekly, a "visual connection to customers". When Terminal 5 opened on 27 March 2008, British Airways staff, including crew check-in staff, relocated from the Compass Centre to Terminal 5. London based interior designer Katharine Pooley was commissioned to design the interior of the Windsor Suite which receives and hosts VIPs.

In April 2023, Heathrow proposed renaming Terminal 5 as "The King's Terminal" after King Charles III to celebrate his coronation, similar to Terminal 2 being named "The Queen's Terminal" after his mother Queen Elizabeth II. However, King Charles declined the offer due to environmental concerns.

=== Satellite terminal buildings ===
Terminal 5B was the first satellite building to be built. Terminal 5C is the second satellite building, opening unofficially on 20 May 2011, with official opening on 1 June 2011, in conjunction with the relaunch of British Airways service to San Diego. Terminal 5B measures 442 metres (1,450 ft) long by 52 metres (171 ft) wide and 19.5 metres (64 ft) high, and contains 37 lifts and 29 escalators. Terminal 5B also contains an additional premium lounge for British Airways passengers.

There is also the potential for an additional satellite building, T5D, to be located to the east of T5C, as displayed in Heathrow's Capital Investment Plan for 2009. As of 2022 there were no plans to add T5D.

An underground automated people mover (APM), known as the Transit, connects passengers between Terminal 5A, Terminal 5B and Terminal 5C. The escalators which service the APM system from the main T5A concourse are the longest in the United Kingdom – previously this record had been held by Angel station on the London Underground, which had held the title since 1992.

In a level below the APM are pedestrian walkways, which were opened for passenger use in 2015.

=== Frontal building ===
Unlike most airport terminals, the main terminal building does not have direct road access. Instead it is fronted by a six-level frontal building, which contains a bus station and taxi rank (at ground level), a 3,800-space short-stay multi-storey car park (levels 1 to 4) and a drop-off zone (level 5). A walkway at level 1 of the frontal building provides under-cover access to the Sofitel Heathrow Airport T5 Hotel, while a section of level 2 is used for the link to the long-term business car park (see below).

The frontal building is connected to the main terminal by covered walkways at ground level (the arrivals level of the main terminal building) and skybridges at level 5 (departures level). The combination of the two buildings with the linking walkways creates a series of open courtyards. One of these courtyards is occupied by the access structures for the railway station below; others contain a dancing fountain and a grove of 40 London planes, and are accessible to passengers and other visitors.

=== Taller control tower ===
At the time of its design Terminal 5's proposed height was so tall that it would have blocked runway views from Heathrow Airport's then control tower. Therefore, before construction began on the terminal building, a new taller air traffic control tower was constructed. Costing £50 million, it was assembled off-site before being manoeuvred into position within the central terminal area near to Heathrow Terminal 3 during 2004. This control tower weighs nearly 1000 tons and is 87 metres (285 ft) in height, making it one of the tallest in Europe and twice the height of London's Nelson's Column. It became operational in April 2007.

== Airlines ==
As of 1 June 2023, British Airways and Iberia use Terminal 5, with British Airways operating the majority of its flights from Heathrow there, with some short-haul destinations served from Terminal 3 due to T5 capacity restrictions. In summer 2023 British Airways was to move 12 of its long-haul flights to Terminal 3, and 6 of its short haul flights from Terminal 3 to Terminal 5.

Since March 2012, International Airlines Group subsidiary Iberia has operated from Terminal 5, apart from a temporary relocation to Terminal 3 from 12 July 2022 until 31 May 2023.

During the COVID-19 pandemic, several Oneworld members other than British Airways and Iberia also used this terminal. American Airlines moved into Terminal 5 on 7 July 2020, but has since moved back to Terminal 3 on 12 July 2022. On 27 July 2020, Qatar Airways moved into Terminal 5, but moved back to Terminal 4 on 14 June 2022. On 29 July 2020, Japan Airlines moved into Terminal 5. It has since moved back to Terminal 3. China Southern Airlines previously operated from this terminal until it was relocated to Terminal 4 in November 2022.

Unlike Terminal 3 and 4, Terminal 5 handles not only international flights, but also UK and Irish flights along with Terminal 2. Loganair was planning to use this terminal to codeshare with British Airways, but uses Terminal 2 rather than Terminal 5 due to the amount of space used at Terminal 5.

== Ground transport ==
The transport network around the airport has been extended to cope with the increase in passenger numbers. This has involved widening of the M25 motorway, the construction of new branches of both the Heathrow Express and the London Underground Piccadilly line, and connection to the Elizabeth line, opened in 2022.

=== Railway links ===
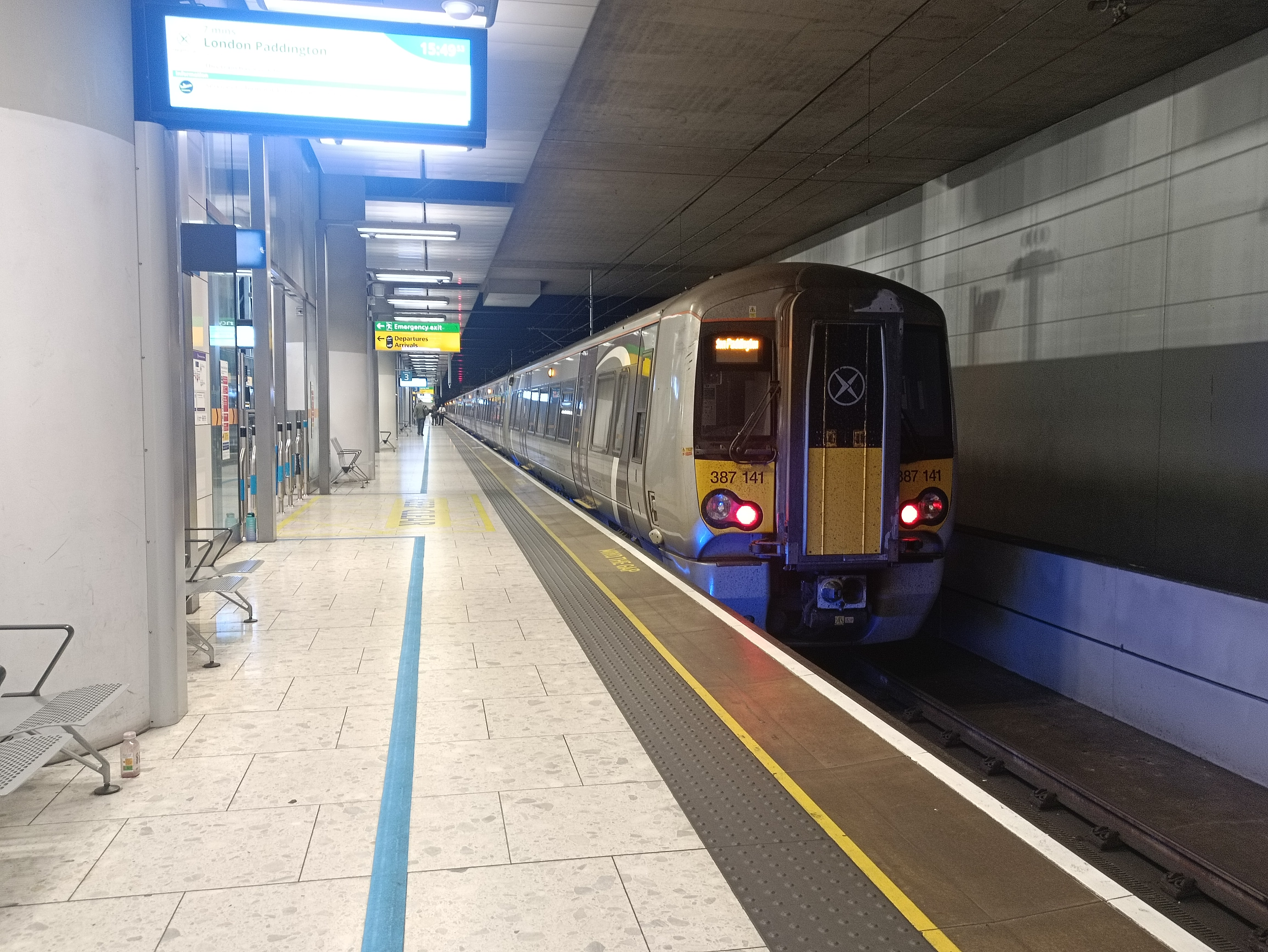
A Heathrow Express Class 387 EMU at the railway station

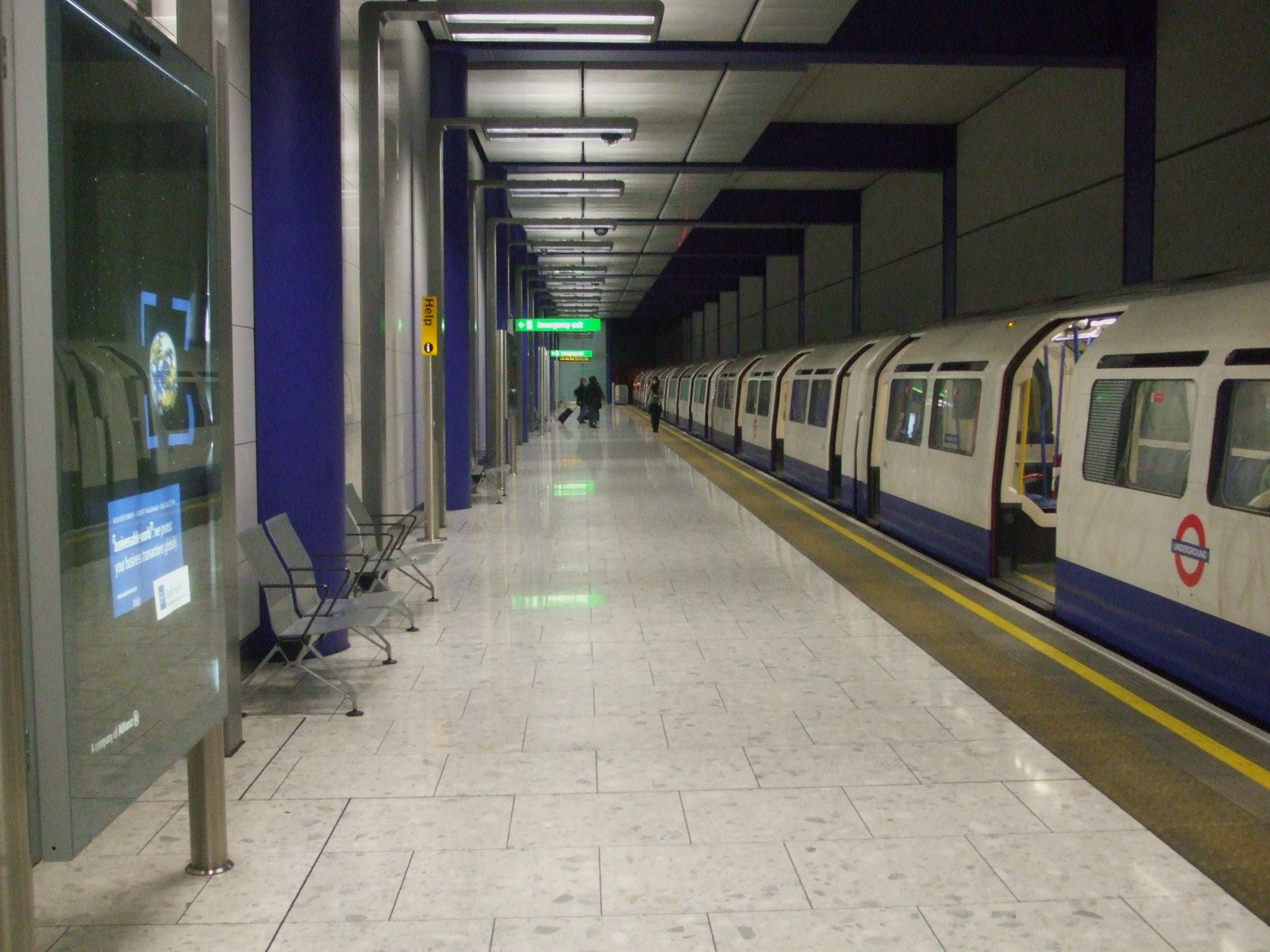
A 1973 Stock London Underground Piccadilly line train on Platform 6 at Terminal 5

The London Underground, Elizabeth line, and Heathrow Express all provide rail connections to Terminal 5, all using Heathrow Terminal 5 station, beneath the main terminal building. The railway station also has two additional platforms for use by a proposed westward railway connection (proposal suspended pending finance).

Heathrow Express provides an express service to Paddington station in central London, stopping only at Heathrow stations (T5, and T2/T3). Trains run every 15 minutes and the journey time to Paddington is 21 minutes. Premium fares are charged for the service to Paddington. However no fares are charged for the journey to Heathrow Central, which provides access to Terminals 2 & 3, to the Heathrow Airport Central bus station, and to the Elizabeth line semi-fast rail service to Paddington. Terminal 4 can be reached by changing trains to the free-of-charge Heathrow Express Shuttle service at Heathrow Central.

Heathrow Terminal 5 is served by the newer Elizabeth line (since 2022), connecting to central London with a few stops faster than the Piccadilly line, and to destinations beyond London to the west and to the east. Fares are lower than the Heathrow Express, although a supplement to the standard Underground fare is charged.

The Piccadilly line of the London Underground provides a slower service every ten minutes through central London to Cockfosters, stopping at many stations and with connections to the whole London Underground network. Journey time to central London is about an hour, depending on destination. The Piccadilly line is integrated into the Transport for London fare system, with lower fares than other rail options.

Terminal 5 is also served by RailAir express buses, which link the terminal's bus station (see below) with Reading station for rail services to the west, and Woking station for services to the south.

=== Road links ===
A dedicated motorway spur has been built from the M25 between junctions 14 and 15 to the terminal. The spur also connects to the airport's perimeter road, and provides direct connections to the frontal building at ground level (for bus station and taxi rank), level 4 (for car parking) and level 5 (for departure set down). The car parking on levels 1 to 3 is accessed from a series of spiral ramps that descend from level 4 to ground level.

Besides the short-stay car parking in front of the main terminal, Terminal 5 is also served by separate business and long-term car parks. These are accessed from the airport's perimeter road and are some distance from the terminal. The long-term car park is linked to the terminal by bus, and the business car park is served by an elevated personal rapid transit system (see below).

The terminal is also connected to Terminals 1, 2 and 3 by the Heathrow Airside Road Tunnel, which is not available for public traffic.

=== Bus links ===
The bus and coach station in the frontal building is served by a number of bus and coach services, including long-distance National Express coach service, "The Airline" service running from Oxford, RailAir buses, local public bus services, shuttle buses to airport hotels, long term car parking and car hire lots, and staff shuttle buses.

Because Terminal 5 is close to the boundary of Greater London, some local buses are part of the London Buses network, whilst others are run by operators from outside the London Buses area.

=== Personal rapid transit ===
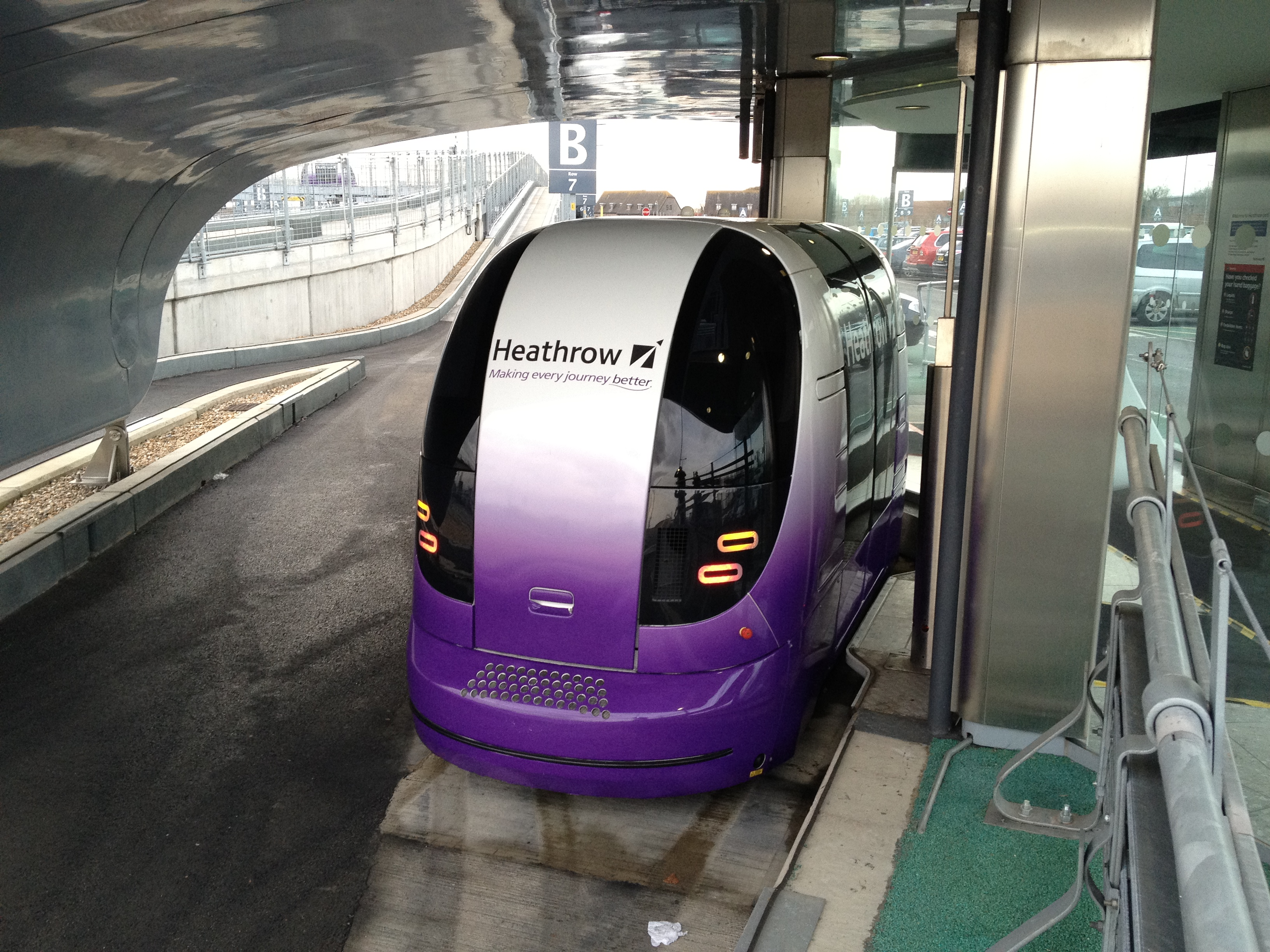
A Heathrow Pod vehicle at the T5 business car park

A 2.4-mile (3.9 km)-long personal rapid transit system, known as the Pod, links the nearby business car park and the main Terminal 5A building. The Pod system is operated landside with a fleet of battery-powered, driverless ULTra vehicles running on an elevated and at-grade segregated guideway. Pod vehicles are operated by passengers using a touch-screen device at Pod stations in the car parks or inside the terminal building.

The service commenced in September 2011. This system was designed by Bristol based Advanced Transport Systems, and the intention is that it will eventually transport passengers around the perimeter fence to Terminals 2 and 3.

=== Automated people mover ===
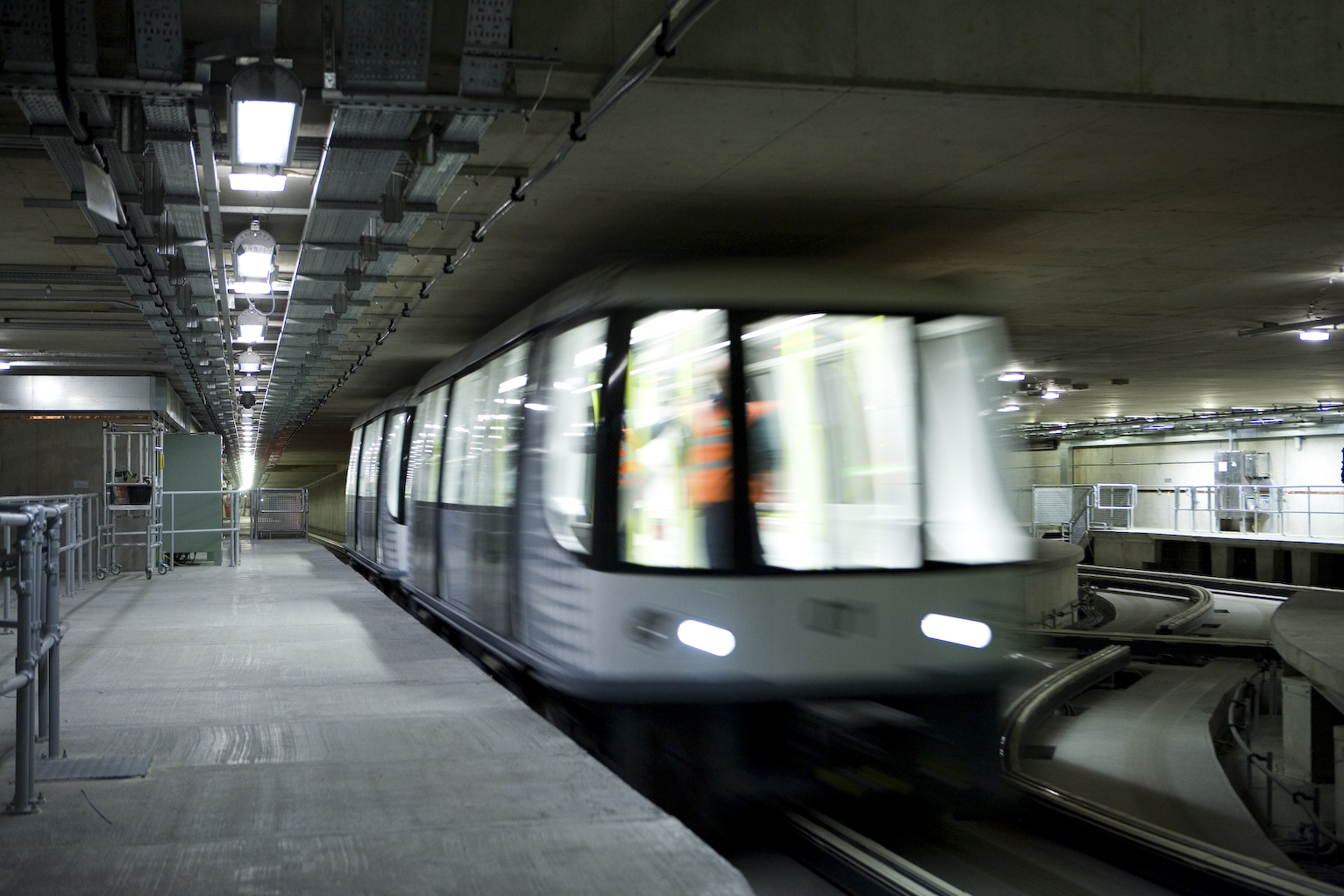
Terminal 5 airside Transit system

An underground automated people mover (APM) system, known as the Transit, is used to transport passengers between the 5A, 5B and 5C buildings. The Transit uses Bombardier Innovia APM 200 vehicles and operates exclusively airside, and is thus only available to passengers and other authorised personnel.

The Transit can accommodate up to 6,000 passengers per hour and the trains run at 50 kilometres per hour (31 mph) with a journey time of 45 seconds. Passengers descend to the station via a pair of escalators "thought to be the largest in Europe in an open environment". The escalators are also the longest in the United Kingdom, longer than those at Angel Underground station on the London Underground, which had held the title since 1992.

=== Future developments ===
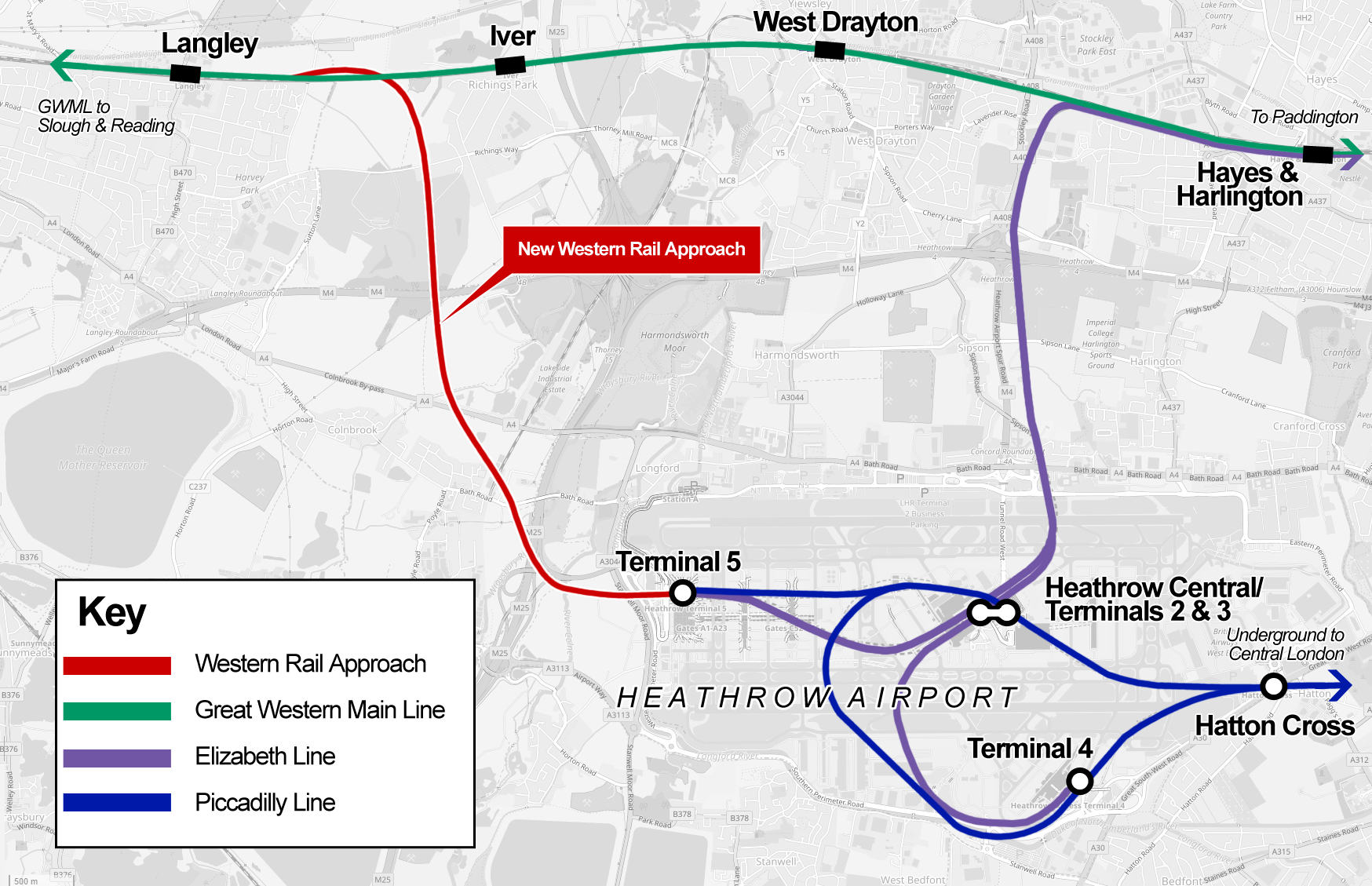
The proposed Western Rail Approach to Heathrow

A proposal for the construction of a Western Rail Approach to Heathrow, a railway link connecting Heathrow Terminal 5 to the Great Western Main Line, was suspended in 2020 pending a satisfactory business case and funding agreement. This link would allow rail services to continue westwards from Terminal 5 to serve stations in the West of England.

== See also ==
- Gordon Ramsay Plane Food
- Sadiq Khan
