= Fourth Street Historic District =

Fourth Street Historic District can refer to:

== United States ==
listed alphabetically by U.S. state, then city

- Fourth Street Historic District (Sioux City, Iowa)
- West Fourth Street Historic District (Maysville, Kentucky)
- South Fourth Street Commercial Historic District in St. Joseph, Missouri
- Barelas-South Fourth Street Historic District in Albuquerque, New Mexico
- East Fourth Street Historic District (Cincinnati, Ohio)
- West Fourth Street Historic District (Cincinnati, Ohio)
- Fourth Street Historic District (Massillon, Ohio), in Stark County

== See also ==
- 4th Street (disambiguation)
- Fort Street Historic District, Boise, Idaho
