= QTR =

QTR may refer to:

- Bell Boeing Quad TiltRotor, a type of aircraft
- Fiscal quarter, in finance
- ICAO designator for Qatar Airways, the flag carrier of Qatar
- Q code, a radiotelegraphy message code

== See also ==
- Quarter (disambiguation)
