= Quartering =

Quartering may refer to:

- Dividing into four parts:
  - Dismemberment, a form of execution
  - Hanged, drawn and quartered, another form of execution
  - Quartering (heraldry)
- Coning and quartering, a process for splitting of an analytic sample
- Quartering, a method in the assaying of gold; see Gold parting § Acid parting
- The Quartering Acts, requiring American civilians to provide living spaces for British soldiers prior to the American Revolution
- TheQuartering, a right-wing YouTube channel

== See also ==
- Quarter (disambiguation)
