= Quartet (disambiguation) =

A quartet is a musical group of four people or a piece written for four musicians

Quartet may also refer to:

== Albums ==
- Quartet (Alison Brown album), 1996
- Quartet (Bill Frisell album), 1996
- Quartet (Herbie Hancock album), 1982
- Quartet (McCoy Tyner album), 2007
- Quartet (Pat Metheny album), 1996
- Quartet (Tony Rice and Peter Rowan album), 2007
- Quartet (Ultravox album), 1982
- Quartets (Boxhead Ensemble album), 2003
- Quartets (Fred Frith album), 1994

== Film and television ==
- Quartet (1948 film), a British anthology film based on W. Somerset Maugham stories
- Quartet (1981 film), a Merchant Ivory film based on the Jean Rhys novel
- Quartet (2012 film), a British comedy-drama film based on the Ronald Harwood play
- Quartet (Japanese TV series), a 2017 Japanese drama series
- Quartet (Australian TV series), 1972

== Games ==
- Quartet (cards), a set of four cards of the same rank
- Quartets (card game), a card game released by many companies
- Quartet (video game), a 1986 video game by Sega

== Literature ==
- Quartet (Harwood play), a 1999 play by Ronald Harwood
- Quartet (Müller play), a 1980 play by Heiner Müller
- Quartet (novel), a 1928 novel by Jean Rhys
- Quartet (short story collection), a 2001 book by George R.R. Martin

== Other ==
- Quartet (computing), 4 bits in computing
- Quartet (sculpture), a 2008 public art work by Celine Farrell
- Quartet on the Middle East, or the Quartet, four entities involved in mediating the Israeli-Palestinian peace process
- Quartette (band), a Canadian country-folk vocal group
- Quartette (drug), a brand name for the birth control medication ethinylestradiol/levonorgestrel

== See also ==
- , equivalent word in German
- , equivalent word in French
- Four-piece musical ensemble
- Quarter (disambiguation)
- Tetralogy, a series of four literary or other works
