= Gareth Kirkwood =

Scottish cricketer

Personal information
- Full name: Gareth Robert Kirkwood
- Born: 15 April 1963 (age 63); Kilmarnock, Ayrshire, Scotland
- Batting: Left-handed
- Bowling: Left-arm medium-fast

Domestic team information
- Years: Team
- 1986: Scotland

Career statistics
Competition	List A
Matches	1
Runs scored	1
Batting average	–
100s/50s	–/–
Top score	1*
Balls bowled	6
Wickets	0
Bowling average	–
5 wickets in innings	–
10 wickets in match	–
Best bowling	–
Catches/stumpings	–/–
- Source: Cricinfo, 3 November 2022

Gareth Robert Kirkwood OBE (born 15 April 1963) is a Scottish business executive and former cricketer.

Kirkwood was born at Kilmarnock in April 1963. He was educated at Hutchesons' Grammar School, before matriculating to the University of Strathclyde. A club cricketer for Poloc in his youth, he made a single appearance for Scotland against Worcestershire at Glasgow in the 1986 Benson & Hedges Cup. In a match which their English county opponents won by 2 wickets, Kirkwood scored a single unbeaten run and bowled one wicketless over.

Kirkwood began his business career with British Airways (BA) in 1986, working in various roles within the information technology department until 1990, when he left to join Speedwing as a commercial manager. This coincided with him studying for his MBA at Lancaster University. He returned to BA in 1992, becoming the general manager for global purchasing at the airline. In 1994, he moved to US Airways, becoming the vice-president of purchasing, later becoming Managing Director of Brymon Airways in 1996. In April 2000, he returned to BA to take up the position of Managing Director of British Airways World Cargo, prior to becoming BA's Director of Operations in 2006. Following the chaotic opening of Heathrow Terminal 5 in March 2008, Kirkwood and Director of Customer Services, David Noyes, were sacked. After departing BA, Kirkwood left the airline industry and began working for Expedia, leading their European transformation for their holiday property rental division. In 2017, he joined The AA as Managing Director, during which he was made an OBE in the 2021 Birthday Honours for services to road transport. Kirkwood departed The AA in January 2022 to become CEO at The Nurture Landscapes Group.

Kirkwood lives in South Oxfordshire with his wife and two children.
