= Forth magazine =

Irish Internet magazine

forth
- Editor: Jason Walsh
- Categories: News and current affairs
- Frequency: Daily
- Total circulation: 40,000 per month
- First issue: 2009
- Final issue: 2018
- Company: forth communications
- Country: Ireland
- Language: English
- Website: forth.ie

forth was an English language Irish Internet magazine focusing on Irish politics, culture and society. It was founded in October 2009 and had almost 40,000 readers as of 31 October 2009. The website's last post was in 2018.

== Editors and contributors ==
forth was edited by Irish journalist Jason Walsh. Walsh has contributed to the Irish Times, the Irish Examiner, the Sunday Business Post, the Guardian, the Sunday Times, The Independent, the Christian Science Monitor, Magill, Village, Business and Finance, Wired, Mute, Rising East and the Dubliner.

Contributors included journalists Lenny Antonelli and Brendan O'Neill, free software activist Richard Stallman, economist Stephen Kinsella, former Sinn Féin councilor Domhnall Ó Cobhthaigh and Gerard Casey.

== Content ==
forth took a partisan left-libertarian stance on current affairs that was described as "sometimes offbeat, often original" by Irish journalist Gerard Cunnigham. The magazine criticized the 'lynching' of Jan Moir, a stance noted by The Guardian and criticized by The Independent newspapers. The magazine has also criticized Ireland's trade unions as timid and in decline, and argued that Trinity College Dublin should be demolished, prompting a response from Senator David Norris.

Alongside its traditional material, forth published a series of correspondences on various subjects called 'Back and Forth'.
