= Wangaratta High School =

Location
- Edwards St; Wangaratta, Victoria, 3677; Australia; 36.3626°S 146.3148°E

Information
- Type: State, secondary, co-ed
- Established: 1909
- Principal: David Armstrong
- Years offered: 7−12
- Enrolment: 643
- Colours: Blue, green, yellow and red
- Slogan: Learning Matters, Relationships Matter, I Matter
- Website: www.whs.vic.edu.au
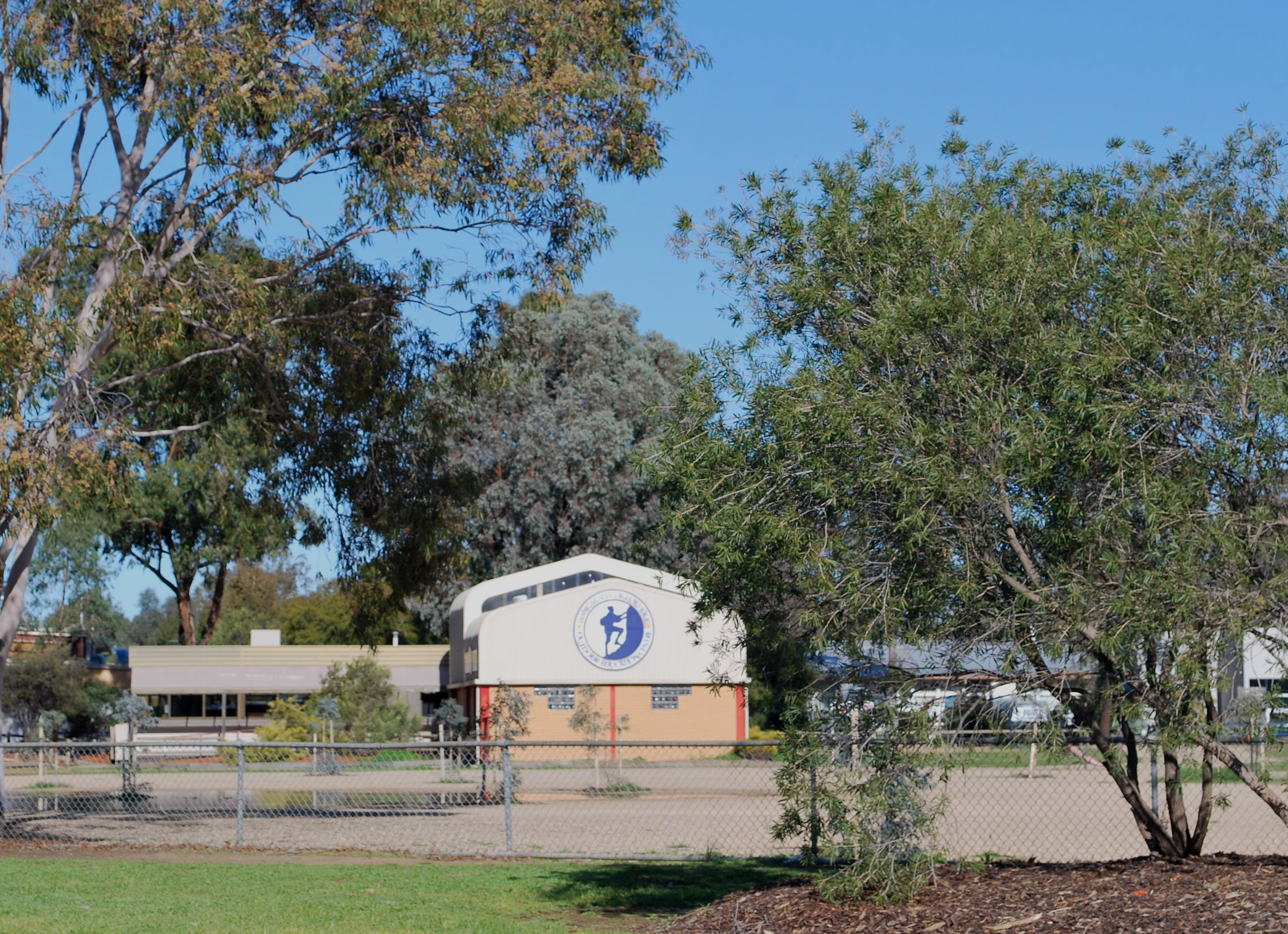
- Physical education centre

Wangaratta High School is a co-educational government secondary day school in Wangaratta, Victoria, Australia. As of 2026, it has approximately 600 students. It was officially established in 1909. Over its 117 year history there has been several iterations, name changes and campus restructures to meet the changing needs of the local community.

== History and Foundation ==
Wangaratta High School was officially established in 1909 as an Agricultural High School. It officially opened with just 18 students and the first headmaster was Julius F. Schilling. He oversaw an ambitious school curriculum that combined practical agricultural training with academic schooling.

The school's agricultural facilities were extensive for the time with a farm that included an orchard, alongside housing for ten animals, dairy facilities and a piggery. The school also included a cookery department, which served meals to help fund its operations and later raised money during wartime.

As the student body expanded in the early 20th century a house system was introduced to organise sporting and extracurricular activities. Ovens and King (named after the rivers) were the two initial houses that were both formed in 1919. The system later expanded with the addition of Merriwa in 1943 and Warrena in 1953, establishing the four-house structure that remains a core pillar of the school today.

In 2009 the school celebrated its centenary with former staff and student alumni of Wangaratta High School, Ovens College, and Wangaratta Secondary College all participating.

== Iterations and Campus Locations ==
As the population of Wangaratta grew and educational models shifted, the school expanded and fractured into different campuses and administrative entities. Wangaratta Secondary College served as the primary state secondary school in the town for many years. In 1999, Wangaratta Secondary College was officially renamed Ovens College. Schooling in Wangaratta was delivered across a multi-campus model, which included the Ovens College campus and the Wangaratta High School / GoTAFE campus.

=== Consolidation ===
In 2014, the school underwent a major structural consolidation. The multi-campus model was abandoned and three separate sites were merged back into a single unified campus. Today the consolidated Wangaratta High School operates from its campus at 17-49 Edwards Street.

== Academic Program and extracurricular activities ==
In years 7-9, Wangaratta High School runs a Select Entry Accelerated Learning (SEAL) program. This program caters to students by providing a differentiated curriculum that moves at a faster pace than mainstream classes. Wangaratta High School is one of only 38 schools that is accredited to run the program by the Department of Education in Victoria. In years 11 and 12, Wangaratta High School offers the Victorian Certificate of Education (VCE) and the Vocational Major (VM) to all students.

Wangaratta High School incorporates a performing arts curriculum that includes a comprehensive music program. The school facilitates several student bands and ensembles that participate in regional performances and interstate music camps. The music department also has a documented history of participation in Kool Skools, an Australian recording project that enables students to produce music in professional recording studios. Wangaratta High School recorded its first student album in 1997 and has been participating ever since. In 1999 and 2002 the school won the prize for producing the best music compared to other participating schools.

The school traditionally has a strong reputation in outdoor education, adventure, triathlon and skiing. It has a long association with Mittagundi Outdoor Education Centre, and a number of Directors/Principals have been past students. The school has previously won the Victorian Inter-schools Cross Country Skiing Championships, and a number of alumni have represented Australia.

== Campus (and revitalisation works) ==
The Edwards street campus has seen continuous modernisation with a new administrative building and dedicated science, technology and arts building were completed in 2013. In 2025, the Victorian state government allocated $11.7 million to a major upgrade for the school. This funding will upgrade the senior and middle school facilities. Works began in 2026 and will be completed in 2027.

The Senior Years Building, completed in 2009 currently houses students in Years 10–12 is a state of the art building powered by geothermal energy. It was completed along with the refurbishment of the Performing Arts Centre (PAC) which features music classrooms and performance spaces.

The Middle Years Learning building housing students in Years 7–9 is currently being refurbished.

Situated on the grounds of the Edwards street, campus is a historically significant fig tree that is dedicated to the soldiers of Australian Infantry 2/24th Battalion, historically known as "Wangaratta's Own". During the Siege of Tobruk (April - October 1941) a fig tree came to serve as a vital regimental aid post for the unit. The tree specimen planted inside the grounds of the school was propagated from a cutting (from the original tree) and donated to the school by the 2/24 Australian Infantry Battalion Association on 29th April, 2011.

In 2022, the school campus was utilised as a venues for the Wangaratta Festival of Jazz and Blues.

== Notable Alumni ==
There have been several incarnations of Wangaratta High School, Ovens College, Wangaratta Secondary College across multiple sites and campuses over its 117 year history. Alumni featured below attended one of these many iterations of the school.

- Paul Bryce, former AFL footballer
- Nick Cave, internationally acclaimed musician
- Jenny Macklin, Former politician and member of federal parliament
- Mette-Marit, Queen of Norway, Attended the school on exchange
- Nick Morris, Paralympic Games wheelchair basketball gold medalist and OAM recipient
- Darcy Vescio, Professional AFL Women's (AFLW) footballer
- Lorna Verdun Sisely, pioneering surgeon and founder of Monash medical centre Brest clinic.
- Dean Woods, Champion cyclist and Olympic Games gold medalist
