= Fourth of the month =

Recurring ordinal calendar date

The fourth of the month or fourth day of the month is the recurring calendar date position corresponding to the day numbered 4 of each month. In the Gregorian calendar (and other calendars that number days sequentially within a month), this day occurs in every month of the year, and therefore occurs twelve times per year.

- Fourth of January
- Fourth of February
- Fourth of March
- Fourth of April
- Fourth of May
- Fourth of June
- Fourth of July
- Fourth of August
- Fourth of September
- Fourth of October
- Fourth of November
- Fourth of December

In addition to these dates, this date occurs in months of many other calendars, such as the Bengali calendar and the Hebrew calendar.

== See also ==
- Fourth (disambiguation)
