= The Quarters =

The Quarters may refer to:

- The Quarters (band), an Australian musical group
- The Quarters, Hursley Park, a cricket ground in Hampshire, England
- The Quarters, Edmonton, Canada
- The Quarters (TV series), Malaysian production
- The Quarters, a horse-racing TV program airing on FanDuel TV
