= Fourth Avenue Building =

Fourth Avenue Building may refer to:

- 1411 Fourth Avenue Building, Seattle, Washington
- Fourth Avenue Building, first office of Dollar Bank on 4th Ave. and Smithfield St., Pittsburgh, Pennsylvania
- Fourth Avenue Building at Portland State University, Portland, Oregon
