= HMS Forth =

Several ships of the Royal Navy have borne the name HMS Forth, after the River Forth:

- HMS Forth was to have been a 36-gun fifth rate, but she was renamed HMS Tigris in 1812 before being launched in 1813.
- HMS Forth (1813) was a 50-gun fifth rate launched in 1813 and broken up in 1819.
- HMS Forth (1833) was a 44-gun fifth rate launched in 1833. She was converted to a screw frigate and undocked in 1856. She became a coal hulk in 1869 and was renamed HMS Jupiter, before being sold in 1883.
- HMS Forth (1886) was a Mersey-class cruiser launched in 1886. She was to have been renamed HMS Howard in 1920, but this did not happen and she was sold in 1921.
- HMS Forth (A187) was a submarine depot ship launched in 1938. She was renamed HMS Defiance between 1972 and 1978 and was sold for scrapping in 1985.
- HMS Forth (P222) is the first of five new Batch 2 River-class patrol vessels. She was commissioned in 2018.
