= York & Albany =

Closed pub in Camden Town, London, England

Coordinates: 51.5360°N 0.1464°W

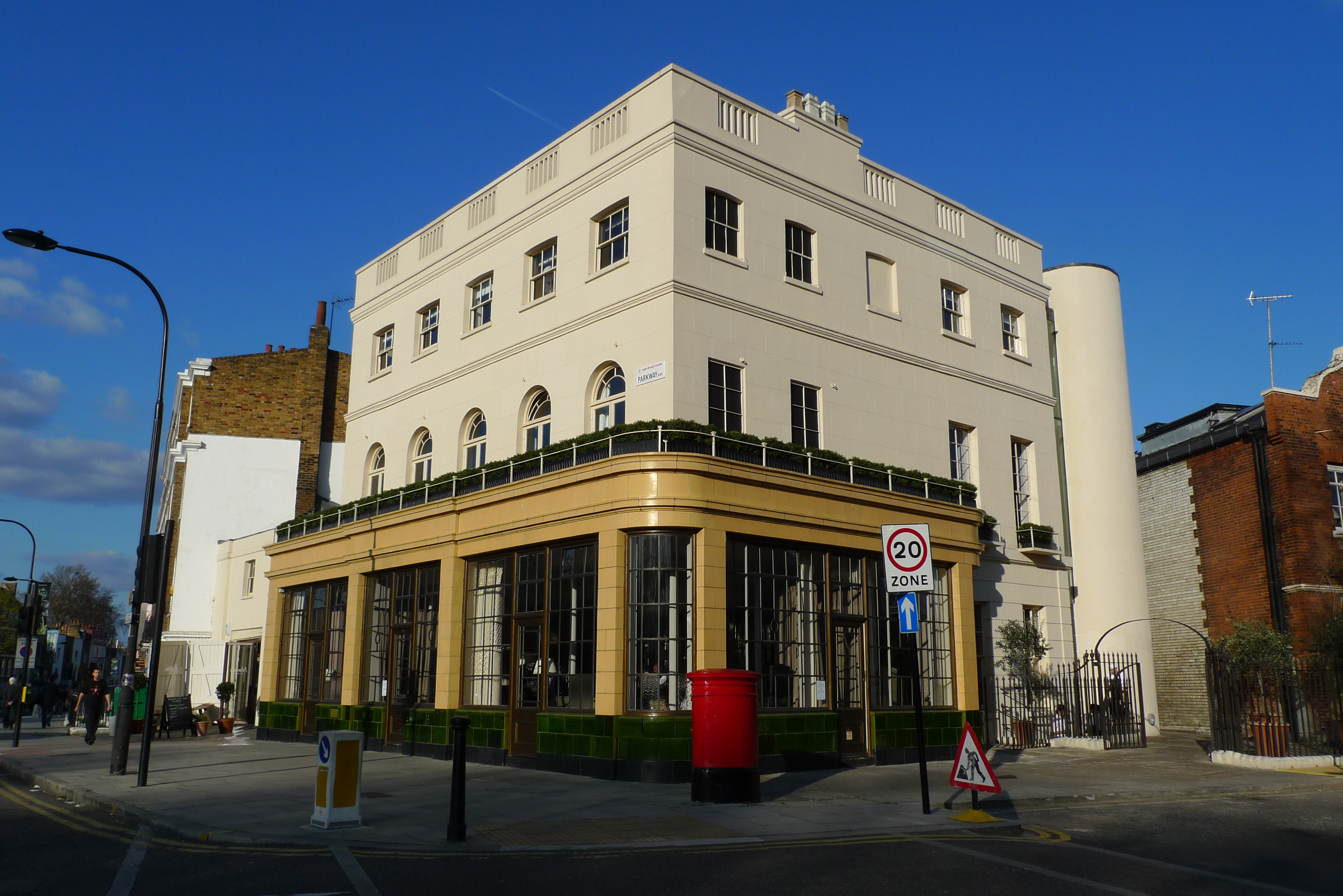
The York & Albany pub in April 2009

The York & Albany is a former pub in Camden Town, London, near Regent's Park. The building is part of a development by John Nash, and is Grade II listed.

It was at one time operated by Gordon Ramsay as a boutique hotel and gastropub. The gastropub was positively reviewed by restaurant critics.

During that period, the validity of the lease was disputed by Ramsay, leading to a legal dispute. The pub closed in March 2024. In April 2024, the building was occupied by squatters, who stated they were running a soup kitchen for the homeless. However, the squatters were successfully evicted in the same month.
