= 4th Street (disambiguation) =

4th Street is a street in Lower Manhattan, New York City, United States.

4th Street or Fourth Street may also refer to:

== Streets ==
- 4th Street Corridor, also known as Retro Row, in Long Beach, California
- East 4th Street (Cleveland), in downtown Cleveland, Ohio

== Places ==
- 4th Street Food Co-op, a food cooperative located in New York City
- 4 Street Southwest station, a light rail station in downtown Calgary, Alberta, Canada
- Fourth Street Historic District, several places listed on the National Register of Historic Places
- Fourth Street Live!, an entertainment and retail complex in Louisville, Kentucky
- West Fourth Street–Washington Square station, an express station of the New York City subway
- West Fourth Street Courts, an amateur basketball venue in New York City

== Music ==
- 4th Street Feeling, a 2012 album by Melissa Etheridge
- "Positively 4th Street", 1965 song by Bob Dylan
- Positively Sick on 4th Street, a 1993 album by the punk rock band the Humpers

== Other ==
- Fourth street, the fourth of five cards dealt to a community card board in poker
- Piggy Tales: 4th Street, the fourth season of the Piggy Tales series and part of the Angry Birds franchise

== See also ==
- Forth Street Works, a former locomotive manufacturing site in Newcastle, England
