= Sally Forth =

Sally Forth may refer to:

- Sally Forth (Greg Howard comic strip), a daily comic strip created in 1982
- Sally Forth (Wally Wood comic strip), an American comic strip created in 1968 for a military male readership
- "Sally Forth", a fourth-season episode of the American television sitcom 3rd Rock from the Sun

== See also ==
- Sally port, a secure, controlled entry way to an enclosure, such as a fortification or prison
