= Fourth Avenue Historic District =

Fourth Avenue Historic District may refer to:

- Fourth Avenue Historic District (Birmingham, Alabama), listed on the National Register of Historic Places (NRHP) in Birmingham, Alabama
- Fourth Avenue Historic District (Pittsburgh, Pennsylvania), NRHP-listed
