= Quarterdeck (disambiguation) =

Quarterdeck can refer to:

- Quarterdeck, part of a warship
- Quarterdeck Office Systems
  - Quarterdeck Expanded Memory Manager
  - Quarterdeck Mosaic
  - Quarterdeck DESQview/X 2.0
  - Quarterdeck Cleansweep
- Quarterdeck Investment Partners, Inc.
- Quarterdeck Ridge
