= Fourth Avenue Line =

Fourth Avenue Line may refer to the following transit lines:

- BMT Fourth Avenue Line, a rapid transit line of the BMT division of the New York City Subway, mainly running under Fourth Avenue in Brooklyn
- Fourth and Madison Avenues Line, a rail line established in Manhattan in the 1830s, replaced by buses on the Fifth and Madison Avenues Line
