= Fourth Amendment =

Fourth Amendment may refer to:

- Fourth Amendment to the United States Constitution, prohibiting unreasonable searches and seizures
- Fourth Amendment of the Constitution of India, a 1955 amendment relating to property rights and trade
- Fourth Amendment of the Constitution of Ireland, which lowered the voting age from twenty-one to eighteen
  - Fourth Amendment of the Constitution Bill 1968, a failed attempt to amend the Constitution of Ireland by abolishing proportional representation elections
- Australian referendum, 1946 (Social Services), the fourth amendment to the Constitution of Australia, extending the powers of the federal government over social services
- Fourth Amendment of the Constitution of South Africa, which made technical changes related to the election of provincial legislature and the National Council of Provinces
- Florida Amendment 4 (2018), the Voting Rights Restoration for Felons Initiative, a state constitutional amendment
- 2024 Florida Amendment 4, a failed abortion rights state constitutional amendment
