= The Quarters (band) =

- Origin: Melbourne, Victoria, Australia
- Genres: Rock; Punk
- Years active: 2005 – present
- Members: Christopher James (vocals/guitar); Stephanie Jane (vocals/bass); Braiden Mann (drums)
- Website: Official website

The Quarters are an Australian alternative rock band, formed in Melbourne in 2005. The band shot to fame in 2007 after they were chosen by Grinspoon to open a Melbourne music festival which included acts such as Grinspoon, The Butterfly Effect and Little Birdy. The Rock and Roll outfit is composed of Christopher James (vocals/guitar), Stephanie Jane (vocals/bass) and Braiden Mann (drums).

== History ==
On 12 November 2005 The Quarters formed as a band in order to fill a vacancy in the Pakenham McDonald's’ McHappy Day Charity Show. A successful first public appearance ensured that when fans expressed interest in further performances Chris, Steph and previous drummer Ivan decided to continue the formation of their band.

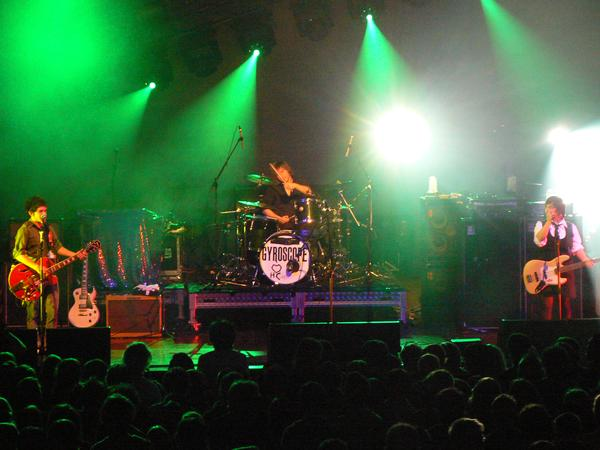
Breakout Festival in Melbourne, 22 September 2007

After playing at iconic local venues such as 'The Castle' in Dandenong for most of 2006, The Quarters quickly gained praised by those in the music industry for their unique sound and attitude. The Quarters were requested to perform at various other venues across Melbourne in early 2007 which led to various interviews on music shows on Channel 31.

Promotional material

However, The Quarters real big break came after they won a competition held by internationally renowned band Grinspoon to unearth Australia's next big thing in Rock music. As part of their prize, The Quarters won the opportunity to perform at the 2007 Breakout Festival in Melbourne alongside Grinspoon and various other international acts such as The Butterfly Effect and Little Birdy. Their unearthing led to widespread media coverage across Australia including national television appearances consisting of an interview on Channel V

Following the success of their performance at the Breakout Festival, The Quarters were invited to support Operator Please, Airbourne and The Getaway Plan on their tours down the east coast of Australia in late 2007 and early 2008. It has been confirmed from sources that in November 2008, The Quarters will be supporting the internationally renowned band You Am I at a performance in Melbourne.

In 2011 The Quarters released a new EP entitled "Tik Tik Boom" and is now available for purchase at their website. Following the release of the EP, and departure of Ivan Rogic, Chris, Steph and new drummer Alex Hingston and are set to being their "East Coast Tour"

== Live performances ==
Venue	Month	Year
The Venue	April	2006
The Drum Theatre	May	2006
The Castle	June	2006
The Castle	July	2006
The Castle	August	2006
The Castle	September	2006
Seaford Hall	October	2006
Rockfest @ The Castle	December	2006
Dream Night Club	December	2006
Aztec Bar	January	2007
Micawber Tavern	January	2007
Aztec Bar	February	2007
Ruby's Lounge	February	2007
Aztec Bar	March	2007
Aztec Bar	March	2007
Rockfest @ The Castle	April	2007
The Castle	May	2007
The Castle	June	2007
Beaconsfield Central Hotel	June	2007
Stamford Hotel	June	2007
Ruby's BOTB Finals	June	2007
The Castle	June	2007
Rockfest @ The Castle	August	2007
Victoria Market	September	2007
Sagi Food and Wine Bar	September	2007
Beaconsfield Central Hotel	September	2007
Festival hall- Breakout 07	September	2007
Brentwood S.C. - BOTB	October	2007
Rockfest @ The Castle	November	2007
The Arthouse	November	2007
Albury City Performing Arts Centre	February	2008
Werribee Festival	March	2008
The Esplanade	March	2008
Rockfest @ The Castle	March	2008
The Basin Progress Hall	April	2008
Glen Waverley Festival	April	2008
The Arthouse	May	2008
The Esplanade	June	2008
The Palace	June	2008
Brentwood S.C.	August	2008
The Castle	August	2008
The Hallam Hotel	August	2008
The Esplanade	September	2008
