= Jan Moir =

British journalist (born 1958)

- Born: August 1958 (age 67)
- Occupations: Columnist, restaurant reviewer
- Known for: Opinion column in Daily Mail

Jan Moir (/mɔɪər/; born August 1958) is a British newspaper columnist. She works for the Daily Mail.

== Career ==
Moir currently works for the Daily Mail, having previously worked for The Daily Telegraph and The Observer newspapers. While at The Daily Telegraph she wrote the restaurant column "Are You Ready To Order?". Moir has won newspaper awards including the Society of Women Writers and Journalists "Lynda Lee-Potter award" for the outstanding woman journalist of the year in 2005, the British Press Awards 'Interviewer of the Year', and What The Papers Say Feature Writer of the Year.

== Stephen Gately article ==
In October 2009, Moir wrote an article about Boyzone singer Stephen Gately's death, arguing that his death was not of natural causes, despite this being the conclusion of the coroner's report, and linking his death to his sexuality and same-sex civil partnership. The article was published in the Daily Mail six days after the singer's death, before his funeral. The article provoked much criticism, with Guardian columnist Charlie Brooker, for example, describing her article as "a gratuitous piece of gay-bashing" and urging readers to contact the Press Complaints Commission. After receiving a record number of complaints, the PCC announced that it would investigate. On 6 November 2009, Moir was awarded the Stonewall Bigot of the Year Award jointly with Father John Owen.

On 17 February 2010, the Press Complaints Commission, whose chairman at the time was Paul Dacre, the editor of the Daily Mail, confirmed that although it was "uncomfortable with the tenor of the columnist's remarks", it would not uphold the complaints made. The Crown Prosecution Service also concluded that there was insufficient evidence that the article had breached the law. In an interview on the BBC Radio's Today programme, PCC chairwoman Baroness Buscombe said the commission found the article "in many areas extremely distasteful" but that the Daily Mail had escaped censure because it "just failed to cross the line".

== Later articles ==
On 30 July 2012, Moir made headlines in the Netherlands when she called Dutch cyclist Marianne Vos "some bitch from Holland" after she defeated Lizzy Armitstead in the Olympic Women's road race and won the gold medal.

On 23 April 2013, Moir accused mezzo-soprano singer Katherine Jenkins of being "fame-hungry" when she ran the London Marathon whilst wearing make-up, designer sunglasses, and diamond earrings. Jenkins tweeted in response, "I adore and support other women [and] wish you could do the same." Katy Brand in The Daily Telegraph reported that Jenkins' comments about Moir's article had been "retweeted hundreds, even thousands of times."
