= List of long-term proposals received by Airports Commission =

List of long-term proposals received by Airports Commission is a list of the long-term proposals submitted to the United Kingdom's (UK) Airports Commission in July 2013 which suggest solutions as to how the UK can maintain its global hub aviation status. In December 2013 the commission announced a short list of three proposals for further study during 2014. The commission announced its preferred solution in July 2015.

== Proposals ==
Proponent	Proposal Name	Location	Extra Runways / Dispersed / Other	Cost (£ billion)	Web link
Aras Global	Heathrow Airport	Heathrow Airport	2	8.5	
Avery Water Shabas	Take Crossrail to Stansted	Surface Access Options	Dispersed / Crossrail	3	
Beckett Rankine	Goodwin Airport	Goodwin Sands	4 - 6	39 (3 runways)	
Birmingham Airport	Birmingham Airport	Birmingham Airport	1	7	
Buro fur MEHR	Drive through airport	Various options	Other	4.3 (Heathrow)	
Exhaustless Inc	Exhaustless Takeoff System	Various options	Other	4.5 (per airport)	
Fairoaks Airport	Fairoaks Airport	Fairoaks Airport	1	n/a	
First Class Partnerships	Stansted	Stansted Airport	3	10	
Flagship Concepts	Euro International Britannic Airport	Foulness	7	30	
Foster+Partners	Thames Hub Airport	Isle of Grain	4	24	
Gatwick Airport	Gatwick Airport	Gatwick Airport	1	5 - 9	
Greengauge 21	Greengauge 21	Surface access options	Dispersed - High Speed Rail	n/a	
Grimshaw	London Hub City	London Hub City	Dispersed - High Speed Rail	n/a	
Heathrow Hub	Heathrow Hub	Heathrow Airport	2	12	
Heathrow Airport Ltd	Heathrow Airport	Heathrow Airport	1	14 - 18	
Imperial College	London Aviation Hub	Dispersed London Hub	Dispersed	n/a	
Infratil Airports London	Manston Airport	Manston Airport	1	1	
Interlinking Transit Options	London Air Rail Rapid Transit System	Surface Access Options	Dispersed - Light Rapid Transit	n/a	
International Aviation Advisory Group	Cliffe	Cliffe	4	12 - 13	
Kent County Council	Dispersed	Dispersed London Hub	2	7.5	
London Medway Airport	London Medway Airport	Cliffe	4	30	
Make Architects	Stansted Airport	Stansted Airport	3	18	
Manchester Airports Group	Stansted & Manchester	Stansted Airport & Manchester Airport	1	2.5 - 4	
Metrotidal Tunnel and Thames Reach Airport	Metrotidal	Isle of Grain	4	28 - 30	
MSP Solutions	Severnside	Severn Estuary	1	5	
MSP Solutions	Stansted	Stansted Airport	3	15 - 25	
Pleiade Associates	LOX	Oxfordshire	4	18.2	
Policy Exchange	Heathrow	Heathrow Airport	2	10	
Private Individual	n/a	East London	n/a	n/a	
Private Individual	Gatwick & Lydd	Gatwick Airport & Lydd Airport	3	n/a	
Private Individual	Heathrow	Heathrow Airport	5	n/a	
Private Individual	Heathrow & Stansted	Heathrow Airport and Stansted Airport	4 - 6	n/a	
Private Individual	Hub Airports	Hub Airports	4	n/a	
Private Individual	Maplin	Maplin Sands	4	n/a	
Private Individual	Midland Express Rail Link	MERLIN – Surface Access	5	n/a	
Private Individual	Severn Estuary	Severn Estuary	2	5	
Private Individual	MAGLEV	Surface Access Options	Dispersed - MAGLEV	12.6	
Private Individual	London Thames Global Airport	Thurrock	4	n/a	
Private Individual	Twyford	Twyford	n/a	n/a	
Private Individual	Universal Hub	Universal Hub – Surface Access	Dispersed - Rail links	n/a	
Private Individual	Walland Marsh	Walland Marsh	4	n/a	
Private Individual2	Heathrow	Heathrow Airport	2	n/a	
Private Individual2	Surface Access	Surface Access Options	Dispersed / High-speed underground railway	n/a	
Progressive Aviation Group	RAF Croughton & Steventon	RAF Croughton & Steventon	4	30	
Quaestus (Poppleton) Ltd	High Speed North	Surface Access Options	Dispersed - High-speed rail	n/a	
Richmond Heathrow Campaign	Richmond Heathrow Campaign	Richmond & Kew	Dispersed - better use of existing capacity	n/a	
Thames Estuary Research and Development Company	London Britannia Airport	Outer Thames Estuary	6	47.3	
Transport for London	Inner Thames Estuary	Inner Thames Estuary	4	68	
Transport for London	Outer Thames Estuary	Outer Thames Estuary	4	84	
Transport for London	Stansted	Stansted Airport	3	68	
Western Gateway Group	Western Gateway	Cardiff Airport	Dispersed / HS3	24.5	
Weston Williamson & Partners	Luton Airport	Luton Airport	3	25	

== See also ==
- Expansion of Heathrow Airport
- Roskill Commission
