= Thames Hub =

Thames Hub may refer to:

- Thames Hub integrated infrastructure vision, a proposal for infrastructure development in the Thames Estuary in the United Kingdom
- Thames Hub Airport, a proposal for a new platform-based hub airport on the Isle of Grain
