= Heathrow Hub =

- Location: London, United Kingdom
- Directors: Mark Bostock, Captain William 'Jock' Lowe, Steven Costello, Peter Lonergan
- Website: www.heathrowhub.com

Heathrow Hub is an independent proposal to expand capacity at London's Heathrow Airport, put forward by Jock Lowe, a former Concorde pilot, and Mark Bostock, an ex-director at Arup Group.

The proposal was shortlisted in Sir Howard Davies' Airports Commission's interim report.

Heathrow Hub proposes extending both of the existing runways up to a total length of about 7,000 metres and dividing them into four so that they each provide two, full length, runways, allowing simultaneous take-offs and landings. The aim is to complete the construction within five years and with 100% private funds.

Available capacity would be doubled while keeping a percentage of the slots unused in order to alter noise levels. In addition, early morning flights could land much further west along the extended runways so reducing the noise footprint for a large area of west London. Other noise mitigation techniques include using two-stage approaches, and steeper, curved climb-outs.

The Heathrow Hub concept includes a new multimodal air, rail and road interchange located approximately two miles north of Heathrow's Terminal 5 to accommodate passenger growth. This includes a new terminal, a new railway station connecting Heathrow to the West Coast Mainline and Crossrail and direct access to the M25 motorway.

According to a paper published by the think-tank the Centre for Policy Studies, the Heathrow Hub proposal would cost ~£10 billion compared to the £65 billion estimated cost of the Thames Estuary Airport situated on the Isle of Grain and promoted by London Mayor Boris Johnson. Heathrow Hub estimates the cost of implementing its expansion plan to reach ~£12.5 billion, including road diversions and a train station. The commission estimates the cost to be around £13.5 billion; higher than HH's own estimate.

The technical work for the proposal has been done by URS Corporation, an international engineering consultancy.
