= Thames Hub Airport =

Proposed airport in Kent, United Kingdom

Coordinates: 51°28′4.79″N 0°42′3.83″E

Thames Hub Airport was a proposed platform-based hub airport located on the Isle of Grain in the Thames Estuary in Kent, whose development has been led by the architect Lord Foster. The idea for the airport was originally included within the Thames Hub integrated infrastructure vision, and the idea of some kind of airport in the Thames Estuary has been discussed since the 1970s.

The case for developing the airport as a solution to the question of how the United Kingdom can maintain its global hub aviation status was submitted, alongside many other solutions, to the UK’s Airports Commission in July 2013 by Foster+Partners. In December 2013, the Commission announced its shortlist of proposals for expanding Britain's airports. The Thames Estuary concept was not included on the initial shortlist.

In September 2014, the Committee concluded that the Thames Hub proposal had "substantial disadvantages that collectively outweighed its potential benefits and that it therefore did not represent a credible option for shortlisting". They described it as "unfeasibly expensive, highly problematic in environmental terms and would be hugely disruptive for many businesses and communities". It remained off the shortlist.

== Background ==
=== Expansion of London’s airports ===
Expanding the capacity of London's airports to meet growing demand is an issue that successive governments have failed to address since the 1950s. In recent years it has been widely claimed that, to provide the level of connectivity that the UK and London require maintaining their global hub status, the capital requires additional hub airport capacity. Proponents of this idea, such as business lobby groups and the aviation industry, believe that further expansion of London's point-to-point airports, such as Gatwick and Stansted, would not address London's claimed need for extra hub capacity. However, some transport experts and many politicians and organisations dispute the need for a single huge hub.

London's largest and only hub airport, Heathrow, has been operating at almost full capacity since 1993. The two-runway airport is less than 20 miles west of Central London and is completely surrounded by urban development, leaving no room to build additional runways to cater for additional air passenger demand. Due to the UK's prevailing southwesterly winds, aircraft predominately approach Heathrow over Central London. As a result, over 750,000 people live within the 55 dB aircraft noise contour and suffer from aircraft noise pollution.

=== Thames Estuary Airport ===
A proposed solution to the need to expand London's hub airport capacity, which has been studied on a number of occasions, is to build a new hub airport in the Thames Estuary. Following the work of the Roskill Commission, the Maplin Development Act 1973 was passed to enable an airport to be built at Maplin Sands. However, the project was cancelled in 1974.

In 2009, London Mayor Boris Johnson announced his support for a proposed new offshore airport in the Thames Estuary at Shivering Sands that had been developed by former Crossrail chairman Doug Oakervee. At the time, the idea of an estuary airport was lampooned by the press.

=== Thames Hub integrated infrastructure vision ===
In November 2011 Lord Foster launched the concept of the Thames Hub integrated infrastructure vision – an integrated infrastructure development in the Thames Estuary which included a high-speed rail line, a combined Thames road and rail crossing and a flood protection barrier incorporating Renewable energy generation#Hydropower renewable energy generation, and a new 150 million passenger hub airport.

== Proposal ==
The Thames Hub Airport would have been built on a platform, partly in the Thames Estuary but attached to the land, on the Isle of Grain in Kent. It would have had four runways, located as two parallel pairs, and would have had a handling capacity of 110 million passengers per annum (mppa), expandable to 150 mppa.

=== Advantages ===
- Significant reduction in the number of people impacted by noise because aircraft would predominantly approach the airport over water
- 24-hour operation (not possible at Heathrow)
- Reduced air-pollution impacts - aircraft emissions are blown out to sea by prevailing westerly winds, and disperse over the water
- Opportunity to redevelop the Heathrow site for housing and a new commercial centre

=== Challenges ===
- High potential for bird strikes
- Relocation of airport staff and businesses that are currently located around Heathrow
- The nearby wreck of the SS Richard Montgomery contains 1,400 tonnes (1,500 short tons) of explosives
- Nearby liquefied natural gas terminals
- The airspace is already crowded. On 13 April 2012, Richard Deakin, the head of National Air Traffic Services, commented that "the very worst spot you could put an airport is just about here". He continued, "We’re a little surprised that none of the architects thought it worthwhile to have a little chat."
- Due to the proximity to water in a temperate climate, fog could be an issue which reduces the capacity for aircraft to land. The Met Office provided a study that stated there would be three times as much fog than at London Heathrow over the course of the year.

== Reaction ==
Boris Johnson, the previous Mayor of London, was a major supporter of a new airport in the Thames Estuary, so much so that the project was even called "Boris Island" by some opponents.

Farrells, another London architecture firm, advocates expanding Gatwick Airport instead, providing a second runway and reconstructing the passenger terminal. Sir Terry Farrell claims this could be "the world’s most efficient two-runway airport", a quicker and cheaper solution, and that it would "turbocharge" the economy of South London. Gatwick Airport set up a website called "Gatwick Obviously" to promote this idea, although a 1979 legal agreement with West Sussex County Council prohibited construction of a new runway before 2019.
