= Alice's Meadow =

Coordinates: 51.839°N 1.158°W

- Location within Oxfordshire
- OS grid reference: SP580159
- District: Cherwell
- Shire county: Oxfordshire
- Region: South East
- Country: England
- Sovereign state: United Kingdom
- Post town: Kidlington
- Postcode district: OX5
- Police: Thames Valley
- Fire: Oxfordshire
- Ambulance: South Central
- UK Parliament: Henley

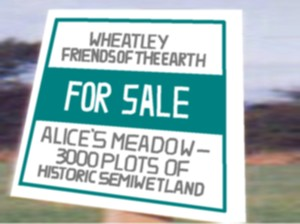
Alice's Meadow 'For Sale' Sign

Alice's Meadow is the name given to a small field in the Oxfordshire parish of Fencott and Murcott, England. It became the focus of a campaign by local people and Friends of the Earth in the 1980s, who opposed government plans to route the M40 motorway across Otmoor.

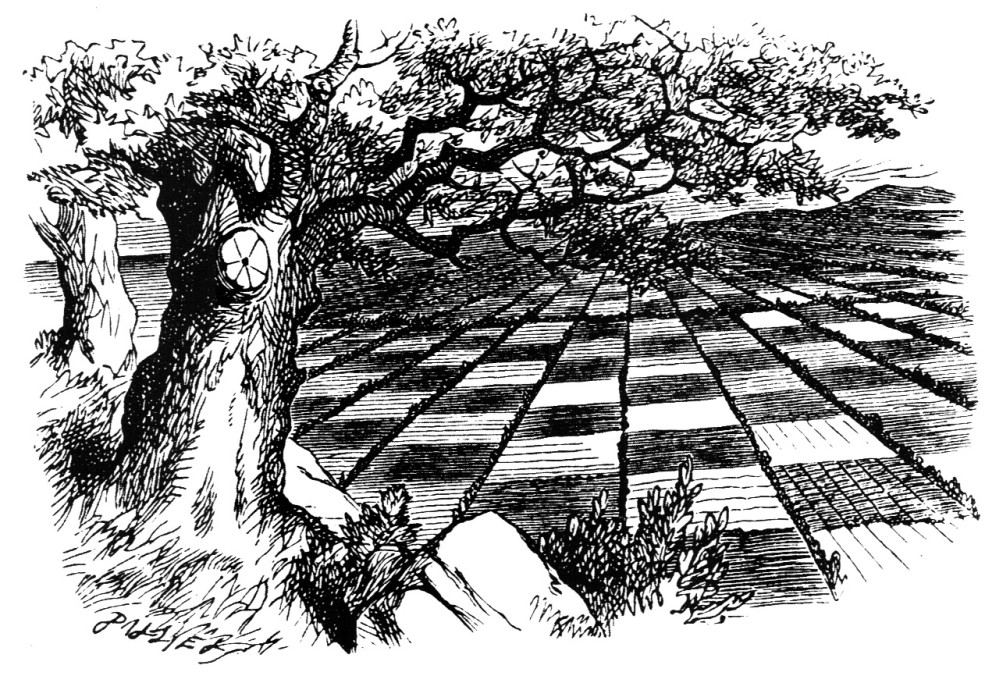
'For some minutes Alice stood without speaking, looking out in all directions over the country—and a most curious country it was. There were a number of tiny little brooks running straight across it from side to side, and the ground between was divided up into squares by a number of little green hedges, that reached from brook to brook. "I declare it's marked out just like a large chess-board!" Alice said at last.' Through the Looking-Glass, chapter II

The name 'Alice's Meadow' is a reference to Lewis Carroll's book Through the Looking-Glass, which is said to have been partly inspired by the 'chessboard-like' field pattern of Otmoor. It lies to the north of Otmoor, between Fencott and Murcott, and was directly on a proposed route for the motorway, which would then have continued, bisecting Otmoor.

Conventional campaigning and action under the planning process led to a public inquiry. Although this ruled in favour of the objectors its decision was not binding on the Department of Transport, which decided to proceed with its original route. While the planning appeals process had been exhausted, landowners of plots along the proposed route still had grounds to appeal through the compulsory purchase procedure. Joe Weston, one of the campaigners, had the idea of taking advantage of this by identifying and purchasing a plot of land on the route, as close to Otmoor as possible.

The field was purchased by Wheatley Friends of the Earth and then sold off to supporters in small plots. This was intended to delay the construction of the motorway significantly by allowing protesters formally to appeal the compulsory purchase of each of the 3500 individual plots.

This tactic was possible only because under the HM Land Registry regulations then in effect for England and Wales, transactions involving small plots of unregistered land were exempt from registration. The regulations have since been revised; any unregistered plot, regardless of size, must now be registered on transfer. The Land Registry charges that would be payable under the current regulations would make a similar sale of micro-plots prohibitively expensive today. Under the regulations for the Land Registries Northern Ireland small "souvenir plots" are still specifically excluded from registration. In Scotland, souvenir plots cannot be sold.

The motorway was eventually built on an alternative route (avoiding Otmoor) that had been recommended by the public inquiry.

The field is currently managed by the Fencott and Murcott Parish Council, which lets out the grazing rights.

== Influence ==
In 1989, the World Land Trust began purchasing plots of land in the Amazon rainforest in order to protect them from illegal logging and deforestation. However, this differed from Alice's Meadow in that the land was not offered directly to supporters but held by the Trust.

In 2009, Greenpeace began a similar campaign with 'Airplot', a small meadow in Sipson, a village which would be demolished under plans for the construction of a third runway for London Heathrow. In this instance the prohibitive land registration charges associated with micro-plots were avoided by employing the legal concept of beneficial ownership. The land was sold back to its original owner in 2012.

== See also ==
- Checkerboarding (land), a similar pattern of land ownership characteristic of the Western United States
