= Thames Hub integrated infrastructure vision =

Transport, energy and flood control plan for South East England, proposed in 2011

Thames Hub

Overview
- Status: Concept
- Locale: United Kingdom (Greater London; South East England)

Service
- Type: Transport, Energy, Flood protection, Environment, Regional Development

The Thames Hub was a proposal for a new approach to integrated infrastructure development that combines rail, intermodal freight logistics, aviation, tidal renewable energy and its transmission, flood protection and regional development in the Thames Estuary and connects this infrastructure to a trade and utilities spine that runs the length of the UK. It was developed by architects Foster + Partners, infrastructure consultants Halcrow and economists Volterra and launched by Lord Foster at the Institution of Civil Engineers in London on 2 November 2011.

A more developed proposal for a platform-based Thames Hub Airport, located on the Isle of Grain in the Thames Estuary in Kent, was submitted to the Airports Commission in July 2013 by Foster+Partners.

== Background ==
=== Infrastructure challenges ===
The Thames Hub concept was developed to address a number of infrastructure challenges facing the UK. These include:

- The economic divide between the North and South of the country.
- The need for a long-term replacement for the existing Thames Barrier which provides flood protection for London
- London's over-congested radial rail network which acts as a bottleneck within the UK's passenger and freight rail network
- The need to develop a direct connection between the current high speed rail line High Speed 1 (HS1) and the planned High Speed 2 (HS2) line.
- The fact that the UK's only international hub airport, Heathrow, is operating at 98% capacity and expansion within the surrounding urban area is controversial; in addition road and rail access to Heathrow from the UK's regions is difficult.
- Inland freight distribution to and from Britain's seaports is over-dependent on a road network that is already overloaded
- The need to increase the UK's renewable electricity generation capacity, provide new utility distribution networks for electricity and water and enhance broadband data connectivity across the regions
- A major housing shortage, particularly in London and the South East, given that the UK's population is forecast to rise to 70m by 2027.
- The need to respond to the rise of emerging economies, the changing nature of global trade and the development of larger container ships, such as the 18,000 TEU Maersk Triple E class ships, and 9,000-mile long range passenger aircraft, such as the Boeing 787 Dreamliner.

In the Thames Hub report, Lord Foster says that "We need to recapture the foresight and political courage of our 19th century forebears if we are to establish a modern transport and energy infrastructure in Britain for this century and beyond." In the accompanying video Foster talks about the consequences of inaction in relation to infrastructure planning and says that "the cost of doing business as usual is unaffordable and is certainly greater than this initiative".

=== Thames Barrier ===
The Environment Agency believes that it will have to upgrade the Thames Barrier some time after 2070. The Agency estimates that the rise in sea level in the Estuary over the next century, due to thermal expansion of the oceans, could be between 20 cm and 88 cm and in a worst-case scenario could be more than 2.7 metres.

=== Rail network ===
London's radial passenger rail network makes it difficult for rail passengers to travel around Outer London and the South East without first going into Central London. In addition rail freight trains need to run through Central London to get between the Thames Estuary ports and the rest of the country.

=== Airport expansion ===
There have been proposals for a Thames Estuary airport since 1943. In 1968 Lord Roskill was appointed to chair the Third London Airport Commission, which considered options for a third London airport including a proposal for an airport at Maplin Sands in Essex. When the commission reported in 1970, the government decided to reject its advice for an airport at Cublington and instead decided to promote an airport at Maplin Sands. However this was abandoned in 1974 as a consequence of the 1973 oil crisis. Options for an estuary airport were considered in detail by the Labour Government as part of its work in preparing the 2003 Air Transport White Paper. However the White Paper announced the government's decision not to progress an estuarial option, but to approve plans for a new third runway at Heathrow.

In 2008 Boris Johnson the Mayor of London announced plans to carry out a study for an estuarial airport in the Shivering Sands area, north-east of Whitstable. The feasibility report, produced in October 2009 by former CrossRail Executive Chairman, Douglas Oakervee (who led the construction of Hong Kong's Chek Lap Kok airport on an island platform), concluded that there is "no logical constraint" to the plan. Although Kansai Airport in Japan is located on a man-made island in the middle of Osaka Bay, the Mayor's proposal was criticised as being too radical and is now commonly referred to as Boris Island.

In 2010 the new Coalition Government reversed the decisions in the White Paper and ruled out further airport expansion of London's three main airports (Heathrow, Gatwick and Stansted). In March 2011 the government launched a 6-month public consultation exercise on its policy for a sustainable aviation framework. In August 2011 the DfT published new air traffic forecasts that predicted (in sharp contrast to those published by the previous government in 2009) that the majority of future air traffic growth to 2050 would be accommodated at regional airports. These new projections have been strongly criticised by airlines because they seem to ignore the strong preferences by airlines to operate hub and spoke networks rather than offering point to point services.

Recent studies published by the British Chamber of Commerce and Frontier Economics for Heathrow's owner BAA estimate that the economic cost of not expanding capacity at Heathrow ranges between £900 million and £1.2 billion per year. Willie Walsh, chief executive of International Airlines Group, which owns British Airways (BA) the largest airline at Heathrow, has recently conceded that plans for a third runway at the airport are "dead" and that BA will now look to expand abroad. In his Mayoral response to the government's sustainable aviation public consultation, Boris Johnson highlighted the fact that China's fastest growing airline was unable to operate at Heathrow due to a lack of airport capacity. The Institute of Directors has called for Government to be bold when drawing up its final aviation framework and to consider such ideas as a new hub airport in the Thames estuary. Simon Jenkins, Chairman of the National Trust has said that a Thames Estuary airport offers "the least harm for the greatest gain".

On 31 October 2011 to the Airport Operators Association, the Labour Party's Shadow transport secretary Maria Eagle announced that the Party had abandoned its support for a third runway at Heathrow Airport but said that the government must also drop its moratorium on new airport capacity in the South East.

In a 27 November 2011 interview in the Sunday Times, former Deputy Prime Minister and current chairman of the government's Regional Growth Fund, Michael Heseltine said that ministers ought to seriously consider an estuarial airport.

On 29 November 2011 the government announced that it would seriously consider "all options for maintaining the UK's hub airport status except a third runway at Heathrow" and on 19 March 2012 Prime Minister David Cameron confirmed that the Thames Hub would be one of those options.

The promoters claim that the Thames Hub proposal complements the UK Government's National Infrastructure Plan and provides a more integrated case than previous proposals for a Thames Estuary airport.

== Proposals ==
The Thames Hub's vision is that integrated infrastructure development can provide benefits not just for London and the Thames Gateway area but for the whole of the country, hence the project's strapline "An integrated vision for Britain". The main components of the Thames Hub are:

- A new flood protection barrier and crossing for the Thames Estuary that extends the flood protection area for London and the Thames Gateway by 150%
- Two opportunities to generate carbon free renewable power – hydropower generators could be integrated into the new flood barrier and an array of hydropower turbines could be installed in the water. Together, these would provide a major new source of clean energy for the South East, while satisfying the demands of the Estuary Airport
- A four-track (two high-speed, two conventional speed) passenger and freight Orbital Rail route around London, which links London's radial lines, a future high-speed rail line to the Midlands and the North, the Thames Estuary ports, the airport, HS1 (Channel Tunnel to London), and European rail networks
- A Thames Estuary Airport, capable of handling 150 million passengers per annum, enabling the UK to retain its global aviation hub status. The airport is integrated within a logistics matrix that connects by rail the Thames Estuary Ports (London Gateway, Tilbury, London Thamesport) with the ports of Liverpool, Southampton and Felixstowe. The multi-layered rail station below the airport will handle 300,000 passengers per day and would be the UK's busiest station
- A new Trade Spine, incorporating utility pipes and data cables linking the Thames Estuary to the Midlands and North of the country via the Orbital Rail route and the UK rail network
- A comprehensive environmental management strategy that minimises the impact of development and provides opportunities to create significant new wildlife habitats to more than offset losses elsewhere. The project could be the catalyst to reduce pressure on foreshore habitats from rising sea levels and storm activity

=== Flood protection barrier and crossing ===
The proposal envisages a new flood barrier, about 18 miles downstream of the existing Thames Barrier, at Lower Hope between East Tilbury in Essex and Cliffe in Kent. The new barrier would provide protection to the year 2100 and beyond and result in a 150% increase in the area of land protected from flooding. The increased value of this land could be used to help finance the project through an insurance levy on those areas protected, offering an early 'first win' for the Estuary development. Residential development on newly protected land east of Gravesend and east of Tilbury could provide homes for Thames Hub staff. To maximise efficiency, housing developments could be grouped to form an energy-efficient network of smart homes. Shipping in the Estuary would however be seriously affected because the barrier location is in the middle of a tight S bend where strong tidal cross currents occur. While navigation channels would be incorporated into the barrier to allow ships to pass, negotiating the barrier would be a challenge for a large ship since it would still be recovering from making its turn while lining up for the barrier.

=== Renewable energy ===
Hydropower turbines could be integrated into the flood protection barrier.

The proposed hydropower array in the Estuary would be 5 kilometres long and 500 metres wide and would harness tidal flows to produce energy with zero carbon emissions. The tidal generation units can sit either on the estuary bed or on floating pontoons. Their proposed location is north of the Estuary Airport and to the south of the Yantlet shipping channel, the main container freight route to Tilbury Docks and the new London Gateway port. By occupying the space between the airport reclamation and the shipping channel the units will present a hazard to smaller craft which currently navigate outside the shipping channel. Depending on the type of generation units used, there is the potential to generate up to 525 gigawatt hours (GWh) of energy per year – enough to power some 76,000 homes. Over a yearly cycle, the energy produced would be enough to supply the Estuary Airport, where demand is estimated as 400–600 GWh/year, allowing excess power to be fed back into the National Grid.

=== Orbital Rail Route ===
The four track orbital rail route will closely follow the alignment of the M25 orbital motorway around London. For around a third of its length, the route would pass through tunnels, particularly in sensitive areas such as Epping Forest. It is estimated to remove around 4,000 lorries per day from the M25 and would reduce the costs of continual motorway expansion and the maintenance demands caused by prolonged heavy use.

The proposal envisages that the orbital rail route could be sunk by one metre into the ground. The excavated earth could then be used to build embankments alongside the track, within which energy and data cables could be laid, in order to provide acoustic shielding and reduce the visual impact of the railway, similar in concept to the use of the Ha-ha in garden design.

New stations along the Orbital Rail route will be located close to existing junctions on the M25, making them accessible by two million people within a 10 kilometre radius. Using the Orbital Rail line to reach their final destinations and thus avoiding central London will allow passenger rail journey times across the capital to be reduced by up to an hour.

In crossing the Thames Estuary, rail tunnels and local road links could be integrated into the flood protection barrier, similar in concept to integration of the Saint Petersburg Ring Road in the Saint Petersburg Dam in Russia.

The Orbital Rail route would provide a missing link between the existing HS1 high-speed rail line and the proposed high-speed line to the Midlands and the North, maximising the impact of both. It also integrates with the new Hub Airport, allowing it effectively to serve the whole of the UK. Up to 60% of airport passengers will arrive using fast, frequent services from across the country

=== Estuary Airport ===
The airport site was selected for its proximity to London – at 34 miles (55 kilometres) from the centre, it can be reached in 30 minutes by high-speed rail. The proposal to build the airport on a platform, like those at Chek Lap Kok in Hong Kong and New Doha International Airport in Qatar would allow flights to take off and land over water, significantly reducing noise impacts and enabling the airport to operate 24 hours a day.

Approximately half the area of the airport platform will be on reclaimed land extending into the Estuary, 7 metres above sea level, with the other half on the Isle of Grain. The on shore portion of the site will require the removal of several villages and the relocation of the recently constructed Grain LNG terminal.

The airport will accommodate long-haul airline schedules and growing demand in the Asian market. Thus it will reassert London's geographical advantage as the stop-off point between North America and Eurasia, which is being eroded by a combination of new long-range aircraft and the emergence of networks centred on a global hub, such as Dubai.

=== Trade spine ===
The trade spine would include rail links and utility cables. High-speed services would reduce journey times significantly from the cities of the Midlands and North to the cities of continental Europe. By rail, it will take approximately 1 hour and 50 minutes to reach the new Hub Airport from Leeds or Manchester.

=== Environmental management strategy ===
As the site is located in an internationally protected Ramsar site a key element of the proposal will be an environmental management strategy to compensate for the loss of wetland habitat and provide an equivalent area of new roosting and feeding grounds for birds.

== Funding ==
The project is estimated to cost £50 billion. The promoters state that it does not need to depend solely on public funding. Established private-sector funding models – such as the Regulated Asset Base (RAB) approach – could provide a funding mechanism for the project. Such an approach is described in a paper for the European Investment Bank by regulatory economist Dieter Helm and how greater use can be made of RAB funding is being studied by HM Treasury.

== Benefits ==
The project is estimated by its promoters to deliver £150 billion of economic and environmental benefits - £35 billion from rail and road transport, £35 billion from the airport, including tax revenues, £2 billion from environmental management and £75 billion from growth in the Thames Hub area. When the benefits are compared to the costs of the project this gives a Benefit Cost Ratio of 3 to 1, which is typically viewed as representing high value for money.

== Public reaction ==
The launch of the Thames Hub proposal on 2 November 2011 attracted widespread media comment, including coverage on television and radio and articles on web sites, in newspapers and the technical press.

=== TV and radio ===
The Hub received extensive coverage on BBC News, BBC News web site and BBC Local Radio stations, such as BBC Radio Kent and BBC Radio Suffolk. It was the lead story on BBC London News 10.30pm bulletin and was the third story on ITV's London Tonight.

=== Newspapers ===
Most national newspapers were positive about the proposals.

The Times referred to it as a "grand plan.... to revive the economy" and in his 'Commentary' for the paper Tony Travers, Director of the Greater London Group at the London School of Economics and Political Science and a regular media commentator, said, in relation to the London economy, "if this plan does not take off, decline is certain". The Daily Telegraph in its 'Comment' section said that it was "refreshing to see ambition reminiscent of Britain’s Victorian heyday in the latest proposals for a new airport in the Thames estuary." The Financial Times said the Hub "could lead to the most radical overhaul of Britain’s transport, logistics and communication network since the building of the railways." The London Evening Standard's editorial said that it was a "welcome, imaginative contribution to the debate about the South East's aviation needs."

Rowan Moore writing in The Observer was more cautious, citing critics who say that the airport could become a white elephant like Montréal-Mirabel International Airport in Canada.

=== Technical press ===
Project magazine, the voice of project management, dedicated five pages of its February 2012 issue to the proposals. It described the project as a "great British project idea", which was aiming to deliver an "innovative and sustainable transport solution fit for the 21st century". New Civil Engineer magazine devoted five pages of its 3 November 2011 edition to the Hub and in the following week it was the most popular story on its web site. The design magazine Design Week said that the Hub had "put the value of huge, design-led national infrastructure projects firmly in front of Government". It also quoted Mat Hunter, chief design officer at the Design Council, as saying "This is a great chance to start with a blank page and adopt a design-centred approach to a major piece of infrastructure.... The fact that Lord Foster, as a globally-renowned, sustainability-aware designer is initiating this project is hugely positive - what’s needed now is to bring together those on all sides to explore how such an exciting project could work financially, environmentally, logistically and politically." Wired UK magazine called the proposal "ambitious".

=== Government ===
A Department for Transport spokesman was quoted as saying that the proposal was an "important contribution to the debate on the future of aviation" and that a Thames Estuary airport would "be considered as part of our wider review of aviation policy."

Boris Johnson, the Mayor of London, welcomed the proposal and a spokesman said that "He is delighted that a distinguished figure like Lord Foster agrees that the answer to Britain’s aviation needs lie in the [Thames] estuary." In November 2011 the Mayor published a study on the economic benefits of a Hub airport for London which referred to the Thames Hub as an "exciting development."

Medway Council in Kent and local MP Mark Reckless announced their opposition to the project.

=== Others ===
Billionaire industrial designer, and founder of the Dyson company, James Dyson has pledged his support for the project.

Friends of the Earth announced their opposition to the project.

== Awards ==
The Thames Hub won Project of the Year 2012 at the Global Air Rail Awards, an international awards ceremony, supported by Airports Council International, dedicated to the air-rail market to recognise best practice in intermodal travel around the world.

== Government announcement ==
The National Infrastructure Plan 2011, which accompanied the Chancellor of the Exchequer's 2011 Autumn Statement on 29 November 2011, confirmed that in consulting on its aviation strategy in March 2012 the Government "will explore all the options for maintaining the UK's aviation hub status, with the exception of a third runway at Heathrow." Conservative Party Deputy Chairman and Kent MP for Sevenoaks Michael Fallon told BBC Radio Kent that the government was looking seriously at plans for a Thames estuary airport. Leader of Kent County Council Paul Carter told BBC Kent that he wanted the government to look at other options – including locating the airport next to the Essex coast. However he said he could see that "there is a very good business case we don’t bleed away aviation business to Holland" by building a new airport close to London. The Financial Times reported that the Chancellor's announcement gave a boost to supporters of a new hub airport in the south-east of England. In response Lord Foster on behalf of the Thames Hub team welcomed Mr Osborne's statement, saying: "We believe that the economic case for the Thames hub is compelling." Boris Johnson also welcomed the government's commitment to "an open debate to explore the capital's future airport capacity needs including the potential for a new airport in the Thames Estuary."

A few days before the Autumn Statement several newspapers had suggested that the Chancellor was supportive of an estuary airport and the evening before the Chancellor spoke Lord Foster had made the case for the Thames Hub in a packed lecture at Oxford University's Saïd Business School. To coincide with the lecture the Thames Hub team also released some new images of the Thames Hub on the Thames Hub web site.

In his Budget 2012 speech in the House of Commons on 21 March 2012, the Chancellor announced that the government would set out its thinking on the issue of retaining aviation hub status in the Summer, thereby delaying the promised March 2012 consultation document.

== Alternatives ==
Alternative, non-estuarial, options for providing additional airport capacity in Kent have been proposed.

One option is to expand Manston Airport. The airport, situated in Thanet, in north east Kent, is relatively close (15 miles) to the Port of Dover and the Eurotunnel Folkestone Terminal and because of this proximity its supporters claim that it could become a hub for arrivals and departures between the UK and Europe and beyond. They also argue that, compared to developing a new airport, expansion at Manston would: a) reduce the amount of taxpayer support that would be needed; b) result in less environmental costs; and c) help regenerate this relatively deprived area of Kent. However Manston is located 65 miles from Central London and the journey time from St Pancras by existing high speed Javelin trains to the nearest rail station at Ramsgate is 1 hour 16 minutes. This journey time could be reduced to under 50 minutes if the old Ashford to Ramsgate railway line, that makes up part of the HS1 route was upgraded to high speed standards, although the Department for Transport has no plans to do this at present. A further challenge for Manston is that the flight path from its single runway is directly over Ramsgate, a seaside resort of some 40,000 residents. The end of the runway is less than 1.5 km from the edge of the Town.

On 19 December 2012 consulting engineers Beckett Rankine launched an alternative proposal for a new hub airport, which they call Goodwin Airport, located on the Goodwin Sands. In the proposal's supporting website they claim that unlike proposals for sites in the Thames Estuary the Goodwin Sands are not in an environmentally protected area, do not require relocation of existing infrastructure (such as Grain LNG terminal or windfarms) and have enough space for in excess of runways separated sufficiently to allow independent operation. The runways at Goodwin can be aligned so that there is no overflying of the coast. Beckett Rankine claim that for these reasons the Goodwin Sands are the most sustainable site available for a new hub airport.

The cost of developing an airport on the Goodwin Sands is claimed to be less than for an airport in the Thames Estuary because there is no infrastructure which has to be relocated and creation of replacement ecological habitats to compensate for the loss of protected habitat is not needed. Furthermore, unlike the Isle of Grain, the site is already in Crown ownership.

Promoted by Beckett Rankine as the hub airport for northern Europe the Goodwin Airport scheme has been welcomed in both France and Belgium.

== See also ==
- Isle of Grain
- Hoo Peninsula
- High Halstow
