= SS Richard Montgomery =

Sunken US WWII ship in the Thames, London, England

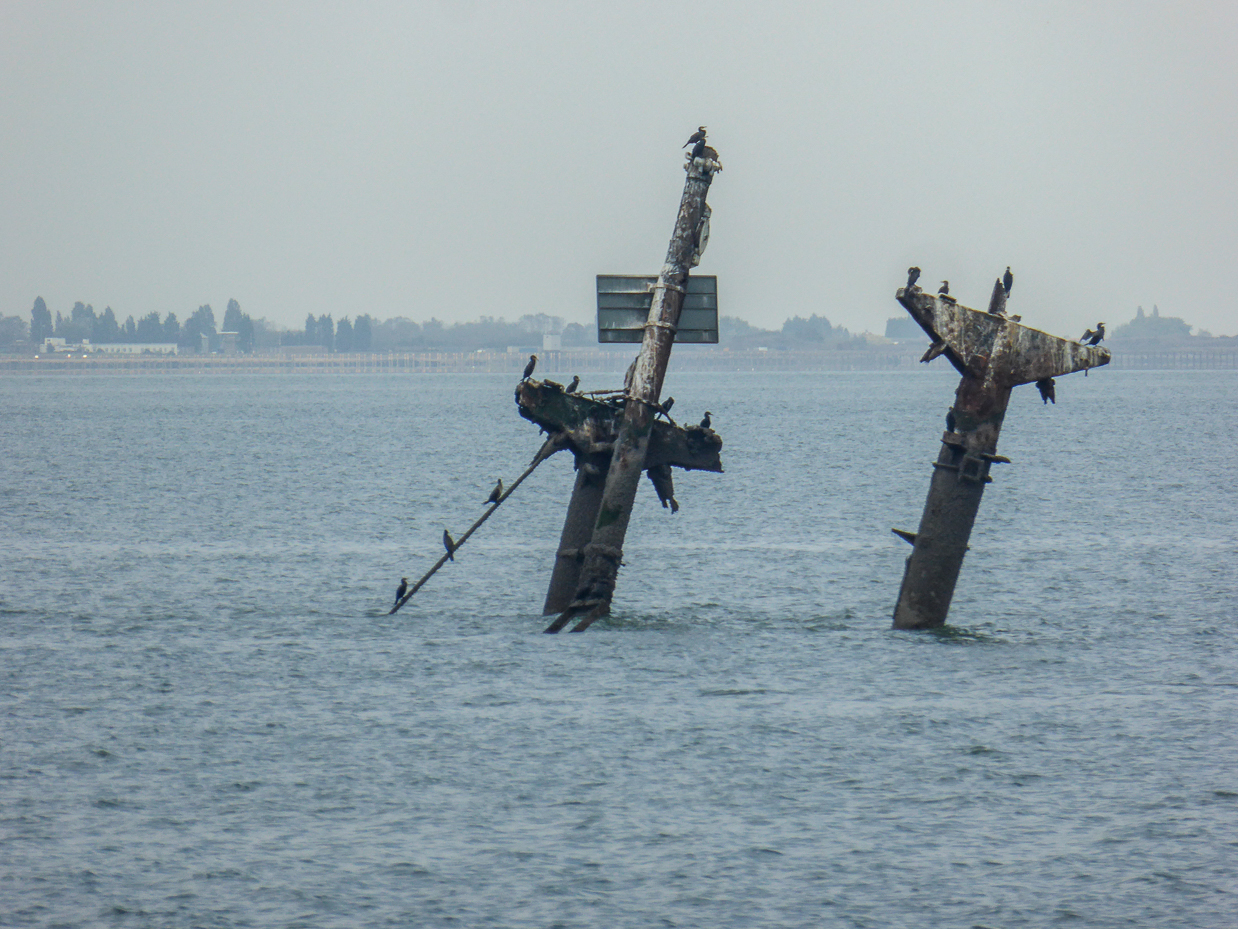
- Visible masts of the wreck of Richard Montgomery in October 2014; they were removed in September 2026

History

United States
- Name: Richard Montgomery
- Namesake: Richard Montgomery
- Owner: War Shipping Administration (WSA)
- Operator: Agwilines Inc.
- Ordered: As type (EC2-S-C1) hull, MC hull 1199
- Builder: St. Johns River Shipbuilding Company, Jacksonville, Florida
- Cost: $2,239,026
- Yard number: 7
- Way number: 1
- Laid down: 15 March 1943
- Launched: 15 June 1943
- Sponsored by: Mrs. Rockwell
- Completed: 29 July 1943
- Identification: Call sign: KOAA
- Fate: Grounded on 20 August 1944 then broke in half and sank on 25 August

General characteristics
- Class & type: Liberty ship; type EC2-S-C1, standard
- Tonnage: 10,865 LT DWT; 7,176 GRT
- Displacement: 3,380 long tons (3,434 t) (light); 14,245 long tons (14,474 t) (max)
- Length: 441 feet 6 inches (135 m) oa; 416 feet (127 m) pp; 427 feet (130 m) lwl
- Beam: 57 feet (17 m)
- Draft: 27 ft 9.25 in (8.4646 m)
- Installed power: 2,500 hp (1,900 kW)
- Propulsion: 2 × Oil fired 450 °F (232 °C) boilers, operating at 220 psi (1,500 kPa); 1 × triple-expansion steam engine; 1 × screw propeller
- Speed: 11.5 knots (21.3 km/h; 13.2 mph)
- Capacity: 562,608 cubic feet (15,931 m^{3}) (grain); 499,573 cubic feet (14,146 m^{3}) (bale)
- Complement: 38–62 USMM; 21–40 USNAG
- Armament: Bow-mounted 3-inch (76 mm)/50-caliber gun; Stern-mounted 4-inch (102 mm)/50-caliber gun; 2–8 × single 20-millimeter (0.79 in) Oerlikon anti-aircraft (AA) cannons and/or, 2–8 × 37-millimeter (1.46 in) M1 AA guns

SS Richard Montgomery is a wrecked American Liberty ship that was built during World War II. She was named after Richard Montgomery, an Irish officer who fought in the British Army during the French and Indian War and Pontiac's War and then in the Continental Army during the American Revolutionary War.

She was wrecked on the Nore sandbank in the Thames Estuary, near Sheerness, Kent, England, in August 1944, while carrying a cargo of munitions. About 1,400 tonnes (1,500 short tons) of explosives remain on board presenting a hazard whose likelihood of explosion is variously asserted to be low to moderate.

== Construction ==
Richard Montgomery was laid down on 15 March 1943 under a Maritime Commission (MARCOM) contract, MC hull 1199, by the St. Johns River Shipbuilding Company, Jacksonville, Florida. She was sponsored by Mrs. Rockwell, the wife of the director of MARCOM, Production Division, and was launched on 15 June 1943. She was the seventh of the 82 Liberty ships built by the yard.

== Service and sinking ==
She was allocated to Agwilines Inc. on 29 July 1943. In August 1944, on what turned out to be her final voyage, the ship left Hog Island, Philadelphia, where she had been loaded with 6,127 tons of munitions.

She travelled from the Delaware River to the Thames Estuary, then anchored while awaiting the formation of a convoy to travel to Cherbourg, France, which had come under Allied control on 27 July 1944, during the Battle of Normandy.

When Richard Montgomery arrived off Southend, she came under the authority of the Thames naval control at HMS Leigh located at the end of Southend Pier. The harbourmaster, responsible for all shipping movements in the estuary, ordered the ship to a berth off the north edge of Sheerness middle sands, an area designated as the Great Nore Anchorage.

On 20 August 1944 she dragged anchor and ran aground on a sandbank around 250 m (820 ft) from the Medway Approach Channel, in a depth of 24 ft (7.3 m) of water. The general dry cargo Liberty ship had an average draft of 28 ft (8.5 m), but Richard Montgomery was trimmed to a draft of 31 ft (9.4 m). As the tide went down, the ship broke her back on sand banks near the Isle of Sheppey about 1.5 mi (2.4 km) from Sheerness and 5 mi (8.0 km) from Southend.

During the inquiry into the shipwreck, it was revealed that several ships moored nearby had noticed Richard Montgomery drifting towards the sandbank. They had attempted to signal an alert by sounding their sirens, but without avail because the ship's chief officer neither reacted nor awoke Captain Wilkie, a failure which he was unable to explain. A board of inquiry concluded that the anchorage the harbour master assigned had placed the ship in jeopardy, and returned the captain of Richard Montgomery to full duty within a week.

A Rochester, Kent-based stevedore company was given the job of removing the cargo, which began on 23 August 1944, using the ship's own cargo handling equipment. By the next day, the ship's hull had cracked open, causing several cargo holds at the bow end to flood. The salvage operation continued until 25 September, when the ship was finally abandoned before all the cargo had been recovered. Subsequently, the vessel broke into two separate parts, roughly amidships.

== Status and risk ==
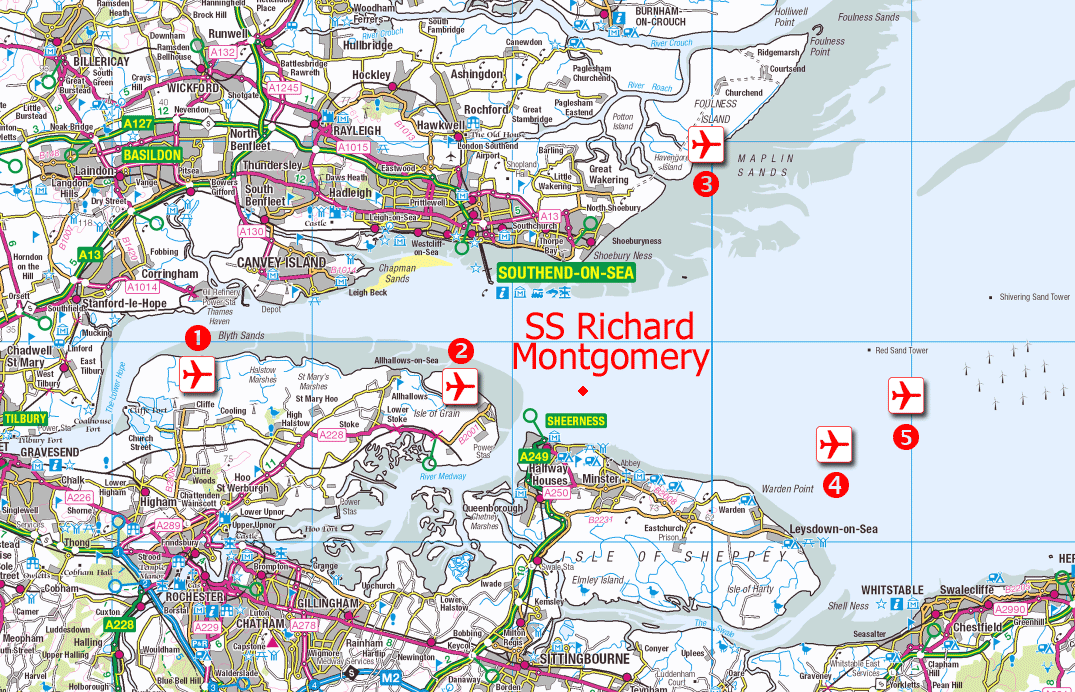
Map of the Thames Estuary indicating the wreck of Richard Montgomery, and locations of proposed airports: 1. Cliffe; 2. Grain (Thames Hub); 3. Foulness; 4. Off the Isle of Sheppey; 5. Shivering Sands ("Boris Island").

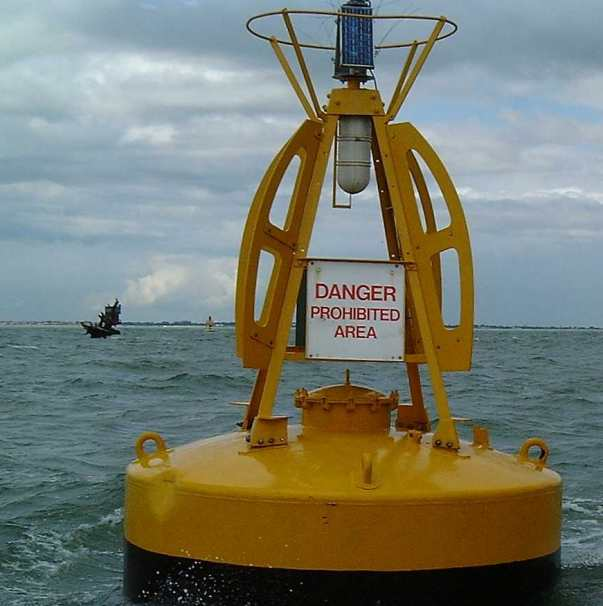
Warning buoy marking the wreck of SS Richard Montgomery (masts visible to left)

According to a 2008 survey, the wreck is at a depth of 15 m (49 ft), on average, and leaning to starboard. Her three masts were visible above the water at all states of the tide until they were removed in September 2026.

Due to the presence of the large quantity of unexploded ordnance, the ship is monitored by the Maritime and Coastguard Agency and is clearly marked on the relevant Admiralty charts. In 1973, she became the first wreck designated as dangerous under section 2 of the Protection of Wrecks Act 1973. There is an exclusion zone around her monitored visually and by radar. (Note: Currently the only other similarly designated wreck is that of SS Castilian, which sank off Holyhead in 1943, whilst en route to Lisbon, and was designated in 1997, as a result of diver interference with her cargo of munitions.) The exclusion zone around the wreck is defined by the following co-ordinates:

- 51°28′04″N 00°47′12″E
- 51°27′57″N 00°47′22″E
- 51°27′50″N 00°47′11″E
- 51°27′58″N 00°47′01″E

In the report of a survey conducted in 2000 by the Maritime and Coastguard Agency the wreck still held munitions estimated by DERA as containing approximately 1,400 tonnes (1,500 short tons) of explosives. This comprises the following items of ordnance:

- 286 × 2,000 lb (910 kg) high explosive "GP" bombs
- 4,439 × 1,000 lb (450 kg) bombs of various types
- 1,925 × 500 lb (230 kg) bombs
- 521-580 fragmentation bombs and 2,297 cases of fragmentation bomb clusters
- Various explosive booster charges, smoke bombs (including white phosphorus bombs) and pyrotechnic signals

One of the reasons that the explosives have not been removed was the unfortunate outcome of a similar operation in July 1967, to neutralise the contents of the Polish cargo ship Kielce, that sank in 1946, off Folkestone in the English Channel. During preliminary work, Kielce exploded with a force equivalent to an earthquake measuring 4.5 on the Richter scale, digging a 20-foot-deep (6 m) crater in the seabed and bringing "panic and chaos" to Folkestone, although there were no injuries. Kielce was at least 3 or 4 miles (4.8 or 6.4 km) from land, had sunk in deeper water than Richard Montgomery, and had "just a fraction" of the load of explosives. According to a BBC News report in 1970, it was determined that if the wreck of Richard Montgomery exploded, it would throw a 300 metres (980 feet)-wide column of water and debris nearly 3,000 metres (9,800 feet) into the air and generate a wave 5 metres (16 feet) high. Almost every window in Sheerness (population circa 20,000) would be broken and buildings would be damaged by the blast. News reports in May 2012, including one by BBC Kent, stated that the wave could be about one metre (3.3 feet) high; though lower than previous estimates, this would be enough to cause flooding in some coastal settlements. (Note: BBC Kent quoted Liberal Democrat Julian Huppert that "[an explosion] would blow out every window in Sheerness, and create a 16 ft wave just outside the capital", and also stated that "Previously experts have said if the wreck exploded it would cause a metre-high tidal wave")

When the condition of the munitions was originally assessed there was concern that copper azide, an extremely sensitive explosive, would be produced through reaction between lead azide and copper from fuze components (lead azide would react with water vapour, rather than liquid water, to form hydrazoic acid, which could react with copper in the detonating cap to form copper azide). Critics of government assurances that the likelihood of a major explosion is remote argue that one of the fuses of the 2,600 fused-fragmentation devices could become partially flooded and undergo the reaction producing copper azide. A knock, such as caused by the ship breaking up further, or a collision on the busy shipping lane, could cause the copper azide to explode and trigger an explosive chain reaction detonating the bulk of the munitions. The Maritime and Coastguard Agency (MCA) said in 1998, "as the fuses will probably all have been flooded for many years and the sensitive compounds referred to are all soluble in water this is no longer considered to be a significant hazard".

The British government's Receiver of Wreck commissioned a risk assessment in 1999; while it was not publicly published, individuals who were familiar with its contents told New Scientist magazine that it outlined five options for dealing with the wreck which were continuing to do nothing, burying the wreck in sand or concrete, or undertaking an operation or series of operations to remove the cargo. If the cargo was to be removed, this would involve Sheerness being evacuated for the duration, followed by the construction of a sandbank and ditch around the wreck to deaden any explosion that might be incurred, with the cargo then being lifted by crane and towed away underwater for disposal. The Maritime and Coastguard Agency convened with local and port authorities to discuss the report in 2001 and concluded that continued inaction "was not an option for much longer".

An investigation by New Scientist magazine in 2004, based partly on government documents released that year, concluded that the cargo was still deadly, and could be detonated by a collision, an attack, or even shifting of the cargo in the tide. The deterioration of the bombs was so severe that they could explode spontaneously. Documents declassified shortly before revealed that the wreck was not dealt with immediately after it happened, or in the intervening 60 years, due to the expense. The Maritime and Coastguard Agency nevertheless believes that the risk of a major explosion is remote. The wreck site has been surveyed regularly since 1965 to determine the stability of the structure, with a diver survey being completed in 2003. High-resolution multi-beam sonar surveys in 2005 and September 2006 found that there had been no recent significant movement of the wreck.

Surveys undertaken in 2008 and 2009 by the MCA, showed that the ship was continuing to deteriorate structurally, with accelerated deterioration in some areas and new cracks appearing in the bow section of the wreck. The report states that "Whilst significant structural collapse does not appear to be imminent, surveys suggest that this prospect is getting closer." The increasing calls for a new airport in the Thames estuary would mean a solution would have to be found for removing the wreck, or at least making it safe, should the airport be built.

The 2010 survey report, released in May 2012, found that, while there had been little change in 2009–2010, the future was uncertain due to the "dynamic nature" of the surrounding environment. Mayor of London Boris Johnson said that engineers had found the wreck would not prevent construction of an airport, and the wreck area would have to be considered. Julian Huppert, the co-chair of the Liberal Democrats committee on transport, disagreed, saying the report demonstrated the ship's continuing deterioration and "must surely put an end to the bonkers idea of building an airport". A 2013 Daily Telegraph article quoting local historian Colin Harvey, agreed the ship would have to be removed before any airport was built and printed a spectrogram showing the ship clearly broken into two pieces. A Department for Transport (DfT) spokesperson said however, that the ship remained stable and the likelihood of an explosion was remote; the matter of the ship was unrelated to the ongoing development of the aviation strategy.

In May 2025, the Secretary of State for Transport restricted flying below 13,100 feet (4,000 m) within a radius of 1 nautical mile of the wreck.

=== Removal of the masts ===
In June 2020, the DfT announced it was looking for a contractor to remove the ship's three masts as they could be placing undue strain on the rest of the vessel structure. The Ministry of Defence warned that the collapse of a mast could detonate ordnance, and Royal Navy specialists would need to remove them safely. In December 2021 it was reported that a contractor supported by the Navy would remove the ship's masts, starting in June 2022. At the end of June 2022 it was reported that the work to remove the masts would be delayed another year. In June 2023, unidentified objects found on the seabed around the ship caused the original plan to remove the masts to be deemed as too dangerous, and the removal was, again, delayed. In December 2023, the MCA determined that the masts had degraded more than expected and scheduled their removal for March 2024. In April 2024, metallic objects were found around the wreck and work delayed again.

In April 2026, a £9.5 million contract was signed for the removal of the masts amid concerns that the site was vulnerable to drone attack or underwater sabotage. This was soon followed by calls for the masts to be preserved and put on display in Sheppey and Southend upon removal; after Warren Stephens, United States ambassador, backed the idea of the masts remaining in Britain, they were ultimately slated to be conserved at the Historic Dockyard Chatham. In July 2026, it was confirmed that the removal work would begin that September, prompting a surge in bookings for tour operators offering excursions to the wreck. Work began on 15 September, with the first mast being removed on 20 September and the second on 24 September. The third and final mast was removed on 30 September. On 19 October 2026, the masts, along with a sign warning of the unexploded ordnance risk and other assorted artefacts, were confirmed as having arrived at the Historic Dockyard, with Parliamentary Under-Secretary of State for Transport Keir Mather taking the opportunity to state that their removal was completed ahead of schedule and under budget.

== In media ==
Saturday-Night Theatre first broadcast in 1979 on BBC Radio 4 the crime drama Blockbuster—scripted by Stephen Barlay, adapting his own novel of the same name—of a blackmail conspiracy to obtain a million pounds from the Bank of England under the threat to cause a detonation of the wreck of the SS Richard Montgomery and so destroy the East End of London. The drama starred Brian Cox, Malcolm Hayes, Haydn Jones, Peter Woodthorpe, and Frances Jeater.

The SS Richard Montgomery was the subject of a plot line in season three of the BBC one drama Waking the Dead from 2003, in the episode titled "Walking on Water".

In the 2014 Rochester and Strood by-election, Mike Barker, a former scientist at the Ministry of Defence, stood as an independent candidate, whose campaign focussed on making the SS Richard Montgomery safe though he polled only ninth place with 54 votes.

In the 2018 Indian movie Vishwaroopam II, the SS Richard Montgomery is the target of an attempted terrorist attack using caesium weapons.

In the second season of the National Geographic documentary series Drain the Oceans, broadcast in 2019, the story of the SS Richard Montgomery's sinking and the status of the wreck was the third story of an episode.

In the second series of the Sky political thriller COBRA, broadcast in 2021, the SS Richard Montgomery, (unnamed in the series), explodes as a consequence of undersea earthquakes, with the consequences predicted in the 1970 BBC report: heavy flooding and property damage in Sheerness with great loss of life—including that of the local MP.

== See also ==
- SS Castilian — WWII shipwreck in the Irish Sea containing explosives.
- List of accidents and incidents involving transport or storage of ammunition

== Bibliography ==
- "St. John's River Shipbuilding, Jacksonville FL". www.ShipbuildingHistory.com. 16 October 2010.
- Maritime Administration. "Richard Montgomery". Ship History Database Vessel Status Card. U.S. Department of Transportation, Maritime Administration.
- Davies, James (May 2004). "Specifications (As-Built)" (PDF). ww2ships.com. p. 23.
- Frank A.Gerhardt. "SS Richard Montgomery". usmaritimecommission.de.
- Turner, F. R. (1995). Wreck of the USS Richard Montgomery. F R Turner. ISBN 0-9524303-6-3.
- Hamer, Mick (21 August 2004). "The doomsday wreck". New Scientist: 36–39. ISSN 1032-1233. Z.
- Anderson, Barrie (October 2008). "Escapade 297". Bright Pen. ISBN 978-0-7552-1093-0.
- Hoskins, Brett (2024). The Fleischer Menace. Treacle Moon. ISBN 9798320144191.
