= Copper azide =

Copper azide may refer to:

- Copper(II) azide, Cu(N_{3})_{2}
- Copper(I) azide, CuN_{3}
