= Copper(I) azide =

Names
- IUPAC name Copper(I) azide
- Other names Cuprous azide

Identifiers
CAS Number	14336-80-2
3D model (JSmol)	Interactive image
ChemSpider	13409797
PubChem CID	18424052
- InChI: InChI=1S/Cu.N3/c;1-3-2/q+1;-1 Key: IXSIQMIYJPIHFR-UHFFFAOYSA-N
- SMILES: [N-]=[N+]=[N-].[Cu+]

Properties
Chemical formula	CuN_{3}
Molar mass	105.57 g/mol

Hazards
- GHS labelling
Pictograms	(GHS01: Explosive)
Signal word	Danger
- Except where otherwise noted, data are given for materials in their standard state (at 25 °C [77 °F], 100 kPa). Infobox references

Copper(I) azide is an inorganic chemical compound with the formula CuN_{3}. It is composed of a copper cation (Cu^{+}) and an azide anion (N^{−}_{3}).

== Properties ==
Copper(I) azide has been used in the preparation of high-energy materials using methods with low environmental cost. These preparations were completed using systems that were high in nitrogen and without any oxygen. Like most azides, it is explosive.

== CuAAC ==
Copper(I) azide is supported during the process of copper(I)-catalyzed azide-alkyne cycloaddition (CuAAC).
