= Thames Estuary Airport =

Proposed airport near London

Thames Estuary Airports
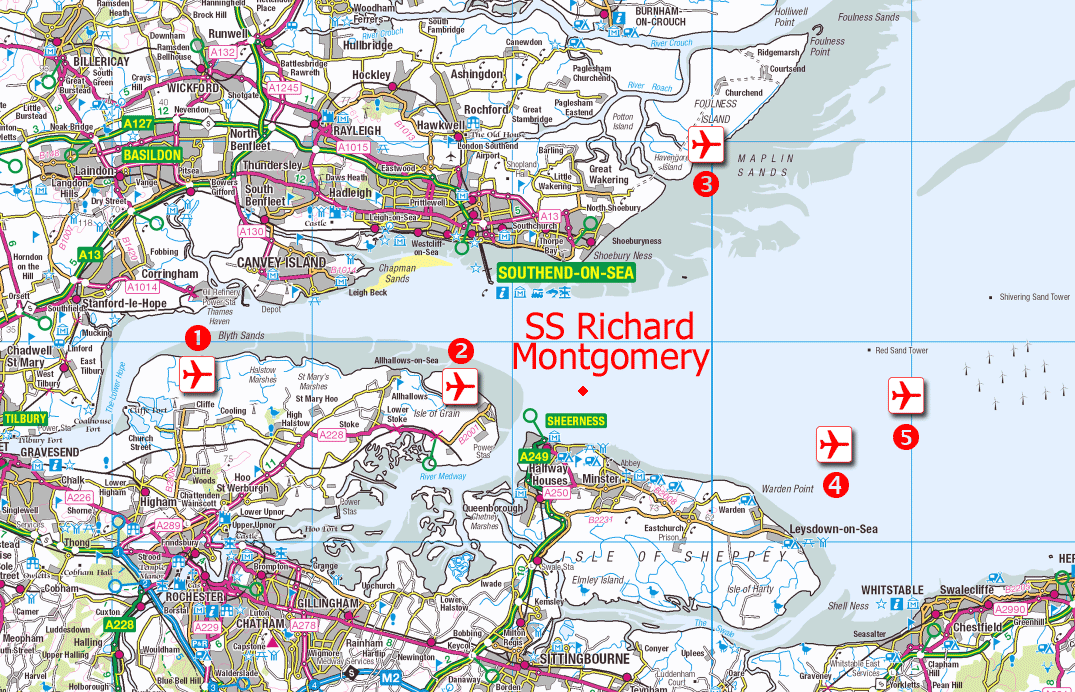
- Locations of proposed Thames Estuary airports, from west to east: 1. Cliffe; 2. Grain (Thames Hub); 3. Maplin Sands, Foulness; 4. Off the Isle of Sheppey; 5. Shivering Sands ("Boris Island") with the exclusion zone around the wreck of SS Richard Montgomery.
- Location: Essex and Kent, UK

A potential Thames Estuary Airport has been proposed at various times since the 1940s. London's existing principal airports, Heathrow, Gatwick, Stansted, and Luton are each sub-optimally located in various ways, such as being too close to built-up areas or requiring aircraft to fly low over London. In the case of Heathrow, the growth of air traffic has meant that the airport is operating at 98% capacity. Several locations for a new airport have been proposed in the Thames Estuary, to the east of London. These include Maplin Sands off Foulness on the north side of the estuary; Cliffe and the Isle of Grain in Kent on the south side; and artificial islands located off the Isle of Sheppey such as the "Boris Island" proposal championed by Boris Johnson, the then Mayor of London. Economic considerations have so far ruled out a new coastal airport, while political considerations have ruled out a new inland airport, leaving planners with an as-yet-unresolved dilemma.

On 17 December 2013 the "Airports Commission: interim report" was published. The proposal for an Isle of Grain airport underwent further study in 2014 before the final report was delivered in Summer 2015.

== Background ==
Before World War II, Croydon Airport was London's principal airport. In 1943 the government built a new heavy military transport airfield on a rural site to the west of London near the village of Heathrow. It was converted to civilian use after the war and went into service as London Airport, later London Heathrow Airport, on 25 February 1946. Another airport already existed at Gatwick and had been used since 1930 as a relief airport for Croydon. A rapid growth in air traffic during the 1950s led to Gatwick becoming London's official second airport in 1954 to accommodate the overspill from Heathrow. Neither location is ideal – the prevailing winds over Heathrow mean that flights have to approach the airport by flying over London, and growth of the city means both airports are now located in built-up areas.

In 1943 the aircraft designer Frederick George Miles of Miles Aircraft and long time associate, architect Guy Morgan suggested the construction of a new airport, including a flying boat base, between Cliffe and Allhallows. Intended to serve 8 million passengers per year, the cost of the scheme was estimated at £20 million. It was planned with a central Terminus, three concrete runways each two and a half miles long and was intended to operate 24 hours a day.

By 1960, it was becoming apparent that further air capacity was needed. Stansted, a former military airfield in Essex, was proposed as a third airport in 1963. A Government White Paper endorsed Stansted in 1967 and in 1968, after an inconclusive public inquiry, the Government appointed Hon. Mr Justice Roskill to head the Commission on the Third London Airport (the "Roskill Commission") to review sites for a third airport. Cublington in the Vale of Aylesbury was its chosen site. It was seen offering the best access, as it was situated on the key London-Birmingham axis, it would be away from built-up areas and it would cost less than most of the alternatives. The proposal met with strong opposition from local people and more broadly from politicians and middle-class voters which made it politically untenable.

== Proposals ==
=== Maplin (Foulness) ===
One influential member of the Roskill Commission, Colin Buchanan, dissented on environmental and planning grounds and proposed an alternative site at Maplin Sands, Foulness, in the Thames Estuary. This opened the door to strong political opposition against Cublington and in April 1971 the government announced that the site at Maplin Sands had been selected for the third London airport, even though it was the most remote and overall the most expensive of the options considered, and that planning would begin immediately. In due course the Maplin Development Act 1973 received royal assent in October 1973. In 1973 a Special Development Order was made under the Town and Country Planning Acts granting planning permission for the project, and the Maplin Development Authority was constituted and began its work. The project would have included not just a major airport, but a deep-water harbour suitable for the container ships then coming into use, a high-speed rail link together with the M12 and M13 motorways to London, and a new town for the accommodation of the thousands of workers who would be required. The new town would eventually cover 82 square miles, with a population of 600,000 people, while the surface route to the airport would require a corridor 100 yards wide and over 30 miles long. The cost would be a then-astronomical £825 million (£6,238 million today), which many – particularly in the Labour Party, which was in opposition at the time – regarded as unacceptable.

The Maplin airport project was abandoned in July 1974 when Labour came to power. The Maplin Development Authority (Dissolution) Act 1976 was passed to wind down the Maplin Development Authority.

A reappraisal of passenger projections indicated that there would be capacity until 1990 at Heathrow, Gatwick, Stansted and Luton, aided by regional airports. The scheme was abandoned in favour of a cheaper plan to enlarge Stansted rather than building an entirely new airport; the requirement for a container ship harbour was to be discharged by the development of Felixstowe. The dilemma regarding the location of an additional airport, whether inland or on the coast, was summed up by an airport expert quoted by New Scientist magazine in 1973: "An inland site is not on politically, and a coastal site is not on economically." Duncan Needham argues that the challenge of airport expansion at Maplin provides direct parallels with airport expansion following the 2006 Department of Transport strategy and debates by policy makers in the subsequent UK governments regarding a proposed third runway at Heathrow.

=== Cliffe ===
In 2002 a Department for Transport study identified a site at Cliffe on the Hoo Peninsula in north Kent as the leading contender among potential sites for a new airport for London. The proposal was for up to four runways arranged in two east–west close parallel pairs, with a possible fifth runway on a different alignment, which might be used only at night and in particular weather conditions. In December 2003 the government decided against the Cliffe proposal on the grounds that the costs of a coastal site were too high, and there was a significant risk that the airport would not be well used.

After 2008, the then Mayor of London, Boris Johnson, led scoping studies for a further airport in north Kent. Suggestions included the development of a major International hub at Cliffe which would link in with the HS1 line through Kent to St Pancras.

The Cameron government was committed to a full Aviation Review and a scoping study was released in March 2011.

=== Isle of Sheppey ===
The "Marinair" proposal was put forward in the 1990s, in which an airport would be built on an offshore artificial island in the Thames estuary, north east of the Isle of Sheppey. When the proposal was put forward again in the government's 2002 consultation, it was rejected on the grounds of insufficient information and prohibitive expense. The Marinair plans had been developed in the years prior to 1990 by Covell Matthews Partnership, and a Thames Estuary Airport Company Ltd established to manage the project, under the direction of A. E. T. Matthews, managing director.

=== Boris Island/London Britannia ===
The Isle of Sheppey proposal was revived in 2008 by Mayor of London Boris Johnson, located a little further to the east towards the Shivering Sands area, north-east of Whitstable. The deputy mayor, Kit Malthouse, supported a Thames estuary airport since before taking office. In November 2008 the mayor appointed Doug Oakervee (executive chair of Crossrail) to lead the Greater London Authority's preliminary feasibility study which determined in October 2009 that there is "no logical constraint" to the plan.

The proposal has acquired the popular nickname of "Boris Island", and is frequently referred to as such in the press. A new iteration of the proposal named the London Britannia Airport was unveiled in November 2013. It was a proposed six-runway airport to be built on an artificial island, comparable to a similar approach taken with Hong Kong International Airport. The scheme was proposed by Testrad (Thames Estuary Research and Development), initially an agency formed by Johnson but now also involving other partners, and was rejected by the airport commission in January 2014 in favour of continued upgrades to Heathrow. This proposal would cost £47.3 billion and would mean the closure of Heathrow Airport.

Proponents argue the scheme's big advantage is that it would avoid flying over densely populated areas and the noise pollution and other problems that causes. Some local councils and the Royal Society for the Protection of Birds oppose the plan, as do current London airports. Critics suggest the scheme is impractical and too expensive; Terry Farrell compared it to grandiose and unrealistic projects devised by Nazi leader Adolf Hitler.

In early 2014 the UK Airports Commission, in its interim report, did not recommend the London Britannia proposal for further analysis.

=== Thames Hub Airport ===
The Thames Hub Airport (like Shivering Sands, nicknamed "Boris Island" after Boris Johnson, the Mayor of London) is a proposal for a 4-runway hub airport to be located on the Isle of Grain in Kent. The airport was part of the Thames Hub integrated infrastructure development developed by architects Foster + Partners, infrastructure consultants Halcrow and economists Volterra and launched at the Institution of Civil Engineers in London on 2 November 2011. Thames Hub combines rail, freight logistics, aviation, energy and its transmission, flood protection and regional development in the Thames Estuary and connects this infrastructure to a trade and utilities spine that runs the length of the country.

The airport would be built on a platform straddling the land and sea off the Isle of Grain on the Hoo Peninsula. It would be opened in 2029 with an initial handling capacity of 110 million passengers per annum. It would be connected to London by a short spur off HS1 with a journey time of 26 minutes.

The site was selected for its proximity to London – at 34 miles (55 km) from the centre and close proximity to HS1, the airport could be reached in 26 minutes by high-speed rail. The proposal to build the airport on a platform, like those at Chek Lap Kok in Hong Kong and New Doha International Airport in Qatar, would allow flights to take off and land over water, significantly reducing noise impacts and enabling the airport to operate 24 hours a day.

The airport would accommodate long-haul airline schedules and growing demand in the Asian market. Thus it would reassert London's geographical advantage as the stop-off point between North America and Eurasia, which is being eroded by a combination of new long-range aircraft and the emergence of networks centred on a global hub, such as Dubai.

The Thames Hub Airport proposal was submitted to the UK's Airports Commission by Foster+Partners in July 2013 as a proposed solution to the question of how the UK can maintain its global hub status. The future remained unclear as the option was not on the commission's original short list, but was still considered. It was finally rejected on grounds of cost (possibly as high as £100 billion) and environmental damage by the Airports Commission in an announcement made on 2 September 2014, leaving Gatwick and Heathrow as the remaining options.

== Advantages ==
Many advantages have been claimed for an airport in the Thames estuary, particularly as a replacement for Heathrow:

- Flights could arrive and depart 24 hours a day.
- The airport would be connected directly to the Channel Tunnel railway services, replacing the demand on short European flights with more efficient train service which reduces CO_{2} emissions by 10 times per journey.
- The new airport would be located over water and not land, so reduces the risks related to emergency landing in densely populated urban areas or concerns over mid-air collision at overloaded runways.
- Use of the existing infrastructure such as high-speed rail line and expanded 8 lane M25/M2 would require far less public funding and would be less complex to adapt than in London for Heathrow Airport rail and road upgrades.
- Would negate the need for a controversial third runway at London Heathrow Airport, or a second runway at London Gatwick Airport or London Stansted Airport
- Offshore island can be easily expanded and new barrier would help to control floodplain.
- The cost of the airport development would be absorbed by the cost to include a new Thames Barrier that will generate power using hydropower turbines.
- A high-speed rail link to London with a journey time of around 20 minutes would encourage more passengers to reach the airport using public transport. Objectors point to the possibility that a high-speed rail link to Heathrow could also be built. However, such a link would require expensive tunnelling under London, and was costed in July 2008 at £4.5bn.
- Crossrail could be extended easily to connect new airport.
- Eurostar could be accessed easily via the new airport.
- Under the Shivering Sands proposal, it would be possible to reach the airport from terminals in both Kent and Essex, diminishing the amount of new traffic and congestion imposed on either county.
- New flight paths to the new airport would reduce the impact on air and noise pollution over London by huge volumes.
- Regeneration of the deprived Thames Gateway.
- Release of 2,500 acres (10 km^{2}) of prime land at Heathrow, close to the M4 and with excellent rail links, highly suitable for housing redevelopment.
- Flexible approach for future expansion, such as new runways or Virgin Galactic type development.

== Disadvantages ==
A number of disadvantages to an airport in the Thames estuary have been pointed out:

- It would require major investment in local infrastructure (roads, railways, schools, hospitals) in order to service the tens of thousands of employees at a major airport.
- There would be considerable upheaval involved in moving London's main airport to a new location, though other major cities have successfully moved their main airports, including Denver (1995), Hong Kong (1998), Athens (2001), Seoul (2001), Bangkok (2006), Doha (2013), and Istanbul (2019) while other cities, such as Berlin and Montréal, have had difficulty with such a transition.
- There would be significant job losses at Heathrow, and knock-on impacts to the economy of west London.
- Fog would be a key difficulty to overcome as it can lead to flights being cancelled. In 2012, the Met Office concluded that 'a new hub airport in the Thames Estuary would be three times more likely to be affected by fog than Heathrow'.
- The construction costs of the airport alone would be large, estimated at £11.5 billion for Cliffe, and £3.5 billion more for an offshore island scheme.
- There would be large costs for constructing road and rail access to the airport. These were estimated at £1.8 billion for Cliffe, including two rail connections to High Speed 1, a road tunnel under the Thames to Benfleet, largely to access the south east Essex labour market, and other road and rail connections. Heathrow rely on public transport and funding for transport infrastructure; major upgrades are also required and need to be considered for rail and motorways.
- Proposals rely on using capacity on High Speed 1; however, it currently only uses under 10% of its full potential.
- Building an artificial offshore island can be expanded; however is time-consuming, adding 3 to 5 years to the construction time.
- There is a risk of bird strike, higher for coastal sites, lower for inland sites.
- The level of demand for an airport in the Thames estuary is uncertain, and may require government intervention to force airlines to use it.
- The massive skilled, semi- and unskilled workforce that a new airport would require (currently all situated in or near West London)
- Building a major new airport to expand capacity may encourage more flights, and thereby increase emissions of CO_{2} and other greenhouse gases, unless a channel tunnel is connected to replace many flights.
- The presence of the wreck of the SS Richard Montgomery, which has around 1,400 tons of explosives on board. A safe way to remove the wreck, present since 1944, has not yet been found.
- It would require a radical upgrade to the current flight patterns which are based on 1970s patterns, and the proximity to Dutch and Belgian airspace may cause knock-on effects in other countries if not planned properly like Heathrow.
- The South East of England (SE) is already highly developed, with a population density reported (in 2011) as the third (or sixth, by other criteria) most dense in the world. Many areas of the SE already have three or four layers of audible air traffic over them.
- The location would be more difficult to access from the rest of the country compared to Heathrow.
- Building the airport would destroy the habitat of thousands of wetland birds.
- London Southend Airport would have to close down, due to its close proximity to the planned airport sites.
- A 2012 report by the South East Local Enterprise Partnership prepared by Parsons Brinckerhoff concluded that they "do not believe that [the Thames Estuary Airport] is a viable solution to the capacity issues facing the SE." in the short term, but "applaud the fact that a long term solution is being seriously discussed".
- Infrastructure - the building of new main airport (and the required supporting industrial, technical and hospitality activities) may be very costly, especially to achieve the same position and size of terminals as in the Heathrow or Dubai ports, which had large expenses despite their initial cheapness.
- Travel to London ticket price. Unknown is how much the ticket may cost, and if the airport would be at position of London tariff schemes. The position of Heathrow as part of the London underground system is often cited as a cost and time difference. For an average traveller usually the time and cost to travel into city centre would be main reason of choosing. Location in the deep sea may be treated as an advantage for most people only if the travel time (at least by public transport) would be faster or similar that from LHR, and would cost less, or for e.g. be fared like usual Zone 1 ticket.
- The proximity of Amsterdam's Schiphol airport would also affect traffic patterns and force aircraft into more circuitous flight paths.
- The potential interference with one of the busiest shipping routes in Europe.
