= Expansion of Heathrow Airport =

Proposals for expansion of Heathrow Airport, London

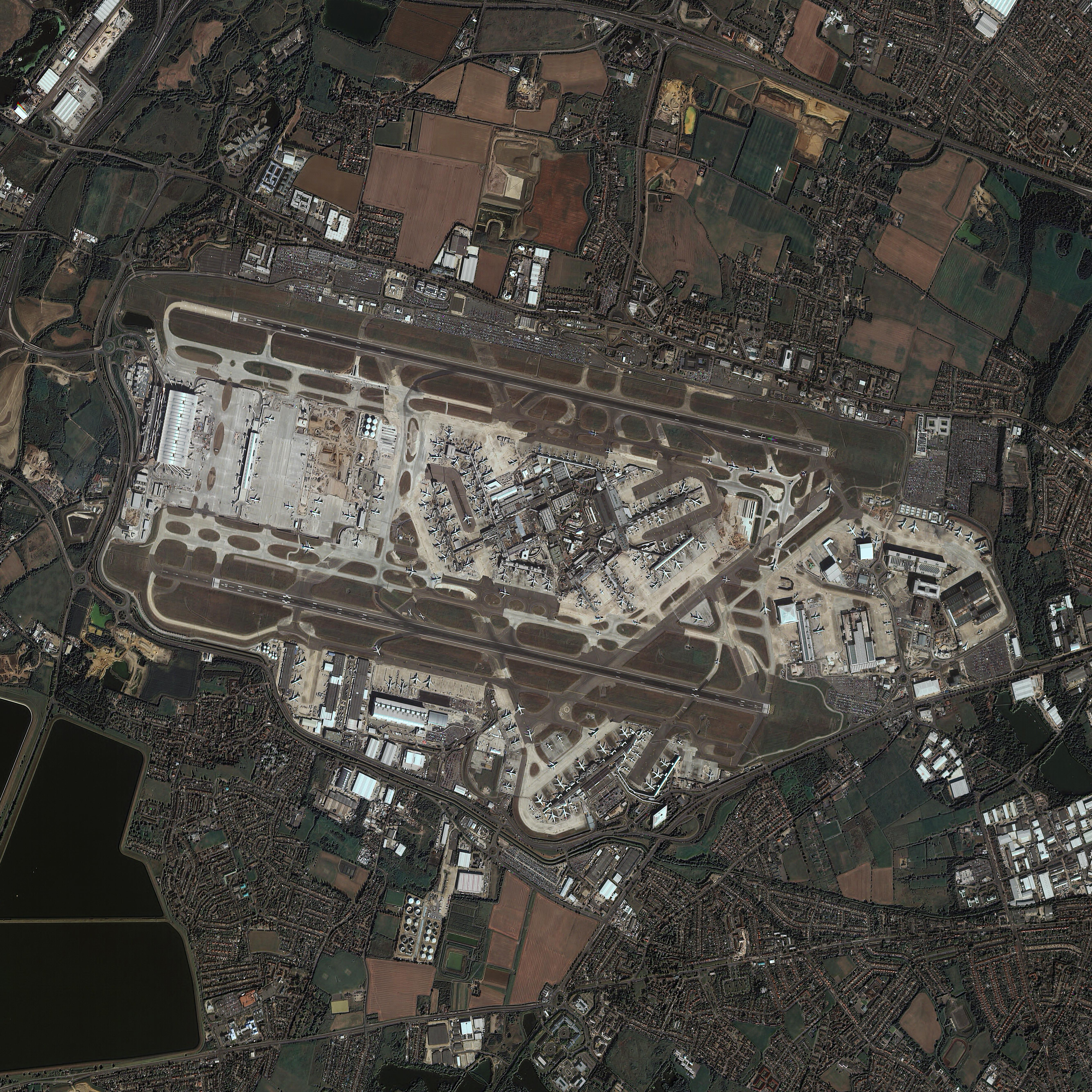
Satellite image of London Heathrow Airport (c. 2007); expansion proposals envisage the addition of new infrastructure to the north and west of the current airport boundaries

The expansion of Heathrow Airport is a series of proposals to add to the runways at London's busiest airport beyond its two long runways which are intensively used to serve four terminals and a large cargo operation. The plans are those presented by Heathrow Airport Holdings and an independent proposal by Heathrow Hub with the main object of increasing capacity.

In early December 2006, the Department for Transport published a progress report on the strategy which confirmed the original vision of expanding the runways. In November 2007, the government started a public consultation on its proposal for a slightly shorter third runway (2,000 m or 6,560 ft) and a new passenger terminal.

The plan was publicly supported by many businesses, the aviation industry, the British Chambers of Commerce, the Confederation of British Industry, the Trades Union Congress and the then Labour government. It was publicly opposed by Conservative and Liberal Democrat parties as opposition parties and then as a coalition government, by Boris Johnson (then Mayor of London), many environmental, local advocacy groups and prominent individuals. Although the expansion was cancelled on 12 May 2010 by the new coalition government, the Airport Commission published its various-options comparative study "Final Report" on 1 July 2015 which preferred the plan.

On 25 October 2016, a new northwest runway and terminal was adopted as central Government policy. In late June 2018, the resultant National Policy Statement: Airports was debated and voted on by the House of Commons; the House voted 415–119 in favour of the third runway, within which outcome many local MPs, including a majority of those from London, opposed or abstained.

On 27 February 2020, in an application for judicial review brought by environmental campaigning groups, London councils, and the Mayor of London, Sadiq Khan, the Court of Appeal ruled that the government's decision to proceed with building the third runway were unlawful, as the government's commitments to combat climate change under the Paris Agreement were not taken into account. In response, the government announced it would not appeal against the decision, but Heathrow announced its intention to appeal to the Supreme Court.

On 16 December 2020, the UK Supreme Court lifted the ban on the third runway, allowing a planning application via a Development Consent Order to go ahead. The plan stalled in 2023 after post-COVID pandemic falling passenger numbers and concerns about investment costs, but as of June 2024 the third runway is still planned with a projected completion date around 2040. In January 2025, Chancellor of the Exchequer Rachel Reeves confirmed it was the new Labour government's plan to proceed with a third runway within the current parliamentary term.

== Plans ==
=== 2009 third runway and additional terminal plan ===
2012 map of Heathrow Airport showing the original proposed extension and third runway; T1 and T2 operations have since merged into the new T2 terminal

In January 2009, the then Transport Secretary Geoff Hoon announced that the UK government supported the expansion of Heathrow by building a third runway, 2,200 m (7,218 ft) long serving a new passenger terminal, a hub for public and private transport set apart from the Central hub between terminals 2 and 3, the southern hub of 4 and western hub of Terminal 5. The government would encourage the airport operator (BAA) to apply for planning permission and to carry out the work. The government anticipated that the new runway would be operational in 2015 or soon after. In 2009 the government stipulated it would limit extra flights to 125,000 per year until 2020, rather than the full capacity of circa 222,000. The third runway plans drafted involve compulsory acquisition and demolition of approximately 700 homes for which 125% market value would be paid to compensate families.

In January 2009, more detailed plans for a third runway were government backed subject to funding, legal and parliamentary approval, together with a terminal which would include a Heathrow Hub railway station to provide the first extra-London rail link using the Great Western Main Line, perhaps at the global definition of "high speed", involving the national High Speed 2 new railway project.

In March 2010, the route for High Speed 2 was announced. It did not include a direct connection with Heathrow, but did include a new station at Old Oak Common before reaching the London terminus of Paddington – also served by Crossrail.

On 12 May 2010, expansion was cancelled as part of the coalition agreement agreed by the new Conservative-Liberal Democrat government. BAA formally dropped its plans on 24 May 2010. However, London First, a lobby group representing many of London's businesses and major employers, continued to press the coalition government to rethink their opposition to the expansion of the airport.

On 1 July 2015, the Airports Commission recommended the third runway with further terminal, with a projected capacity (on completion) of 740,000 flights per year.

On 25 June 2018, the House of Commons voted 415–119 in favour of the third runway. The project received approval from most of the government. A judicial review of the decision was launched by four London boroughs affected by the expansion – Wandsworth, Richmond, Hillingdon and Hammersmith & Fulham – in partnership with Greenpeace and London mayor Sadiq Khan. Khan had previously said he would take legal action if it were passed by Parliament.

=== 2013 Northwest runway plan ===
In July 2013, the airport submitted three new proposals for expansion to the Airports Commission, which was established to review airport capacity in south-east England. The commission was chaired by Howard Davies who, at the time of his appointment was in the employ of GIC Private Limited and a member of its International Advisory Board. Since 2012, GIC Private Limited has been one of Heathrow's principal owners. Davies resigned these positions upon confirmation of his appointment to lead the Airports Commission, although it has been observed that he failed to identify these interests when invited to complete the commission's register of interests. Each of the three proposals that were to be considered by the Commission involved the construction of a third runway, to either the north, the north-west or the south-west of the current airport site.

The Commission released its interim report in December 2013. This shortlisted three options:

- the north-west third runway option at Heathrow
- extending an existing runway at Heathrow
- a second runway at Gatwick Airport

The full report was published on 1 June 2015; this confirmed the north-west runway and a new sixth terminal as the commission's chosen proposal. The Commission estimated the cost as around £18.6 billion; £4 billion higher than Heathrow's own estimate.

The north-west runway and terminal plan was approved by Government on 25 October 2016. In January 2018, in a public consultation, Heathrow unveiled another option with the new runway 300 m (330 yd) shorter, to reduce costs from £16.8 billion to £14.3 billion. This option would still require the M25 motorway to be diverted to a tunnel under the runway, 150 m (160 yd) west of its current route.

The financing of the expansion has yet to be arranged; Heathrow Airport Holdings' finances are already highly leveraged. In 2017 borrowings were £13.4 billion, with shareholder equity of only £0.7 billion.

=== 2025 Labour government plans ===
In January 2025, Chancellor Rachel Reeves confirmed that the Labour government would plan to proceed with the expansion of Heathrow Airport, saying it would "make Britain the world's best connected place to do business". London Mayor Sadiq Khan expressed his opposition on environmental grounds. The CEO of Heathrow Airport, Thomas Woldbye, said that an expansion was "urgent" as the airport was currently working at capacity, to the "detriment of trade and connectivity".

In June 2025, transport minister Heidi Alexander invited proposals which would deliver an operational third runway by 2035. Two responses were received: one from Heathrow Airport Holdings and a smaller-scale plan from Arora Group. In November 2025, Alexander announced that the government had adopted the scheme put forward by Heathrow Airport Holdings, the airport's owner. The proposal outlines a decade-long development centred around the construction of a third runway to be known as the north-western runway, which would be up to 3,500 metres (11,500 feet) in length. The proposal states this would increase the airport's annual capacity to 756,000 flights and 150 million passengers, up from the current figure of approximately 84 million passengers.

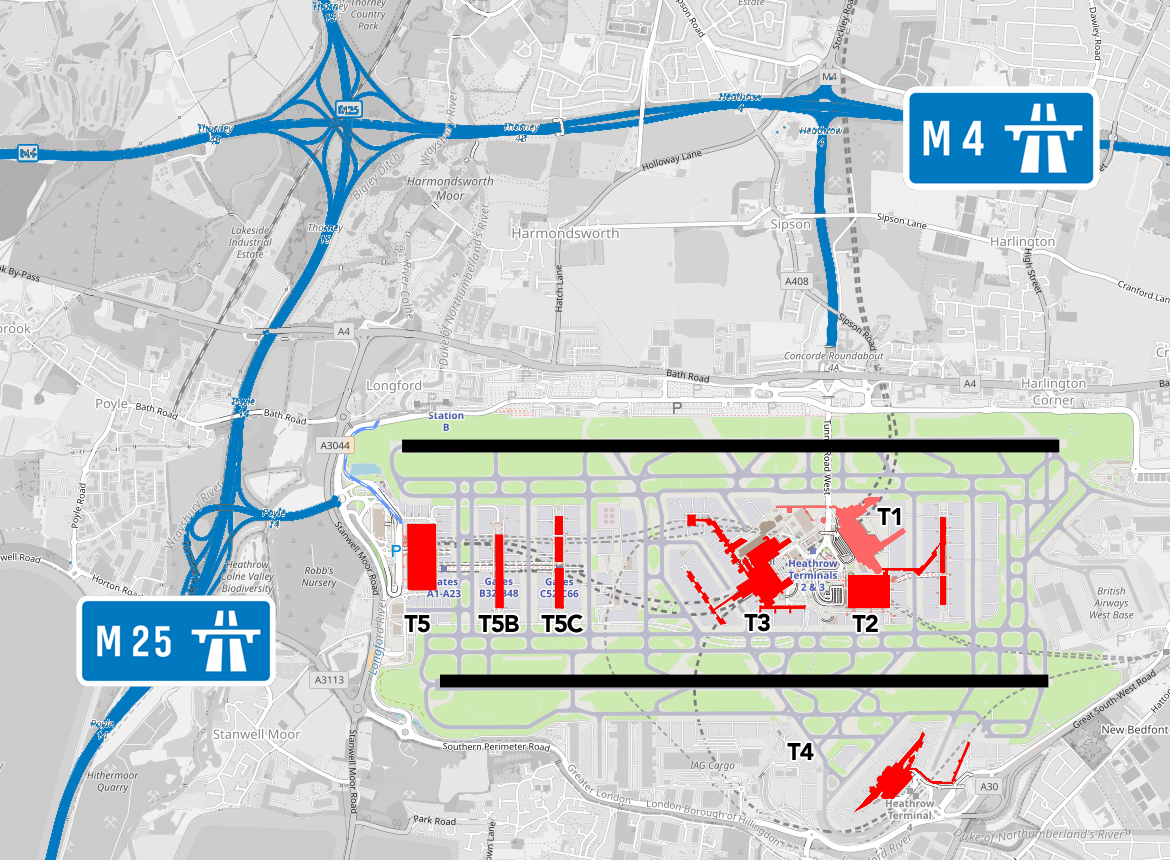
Layout of the current Heathrow Airport terminals

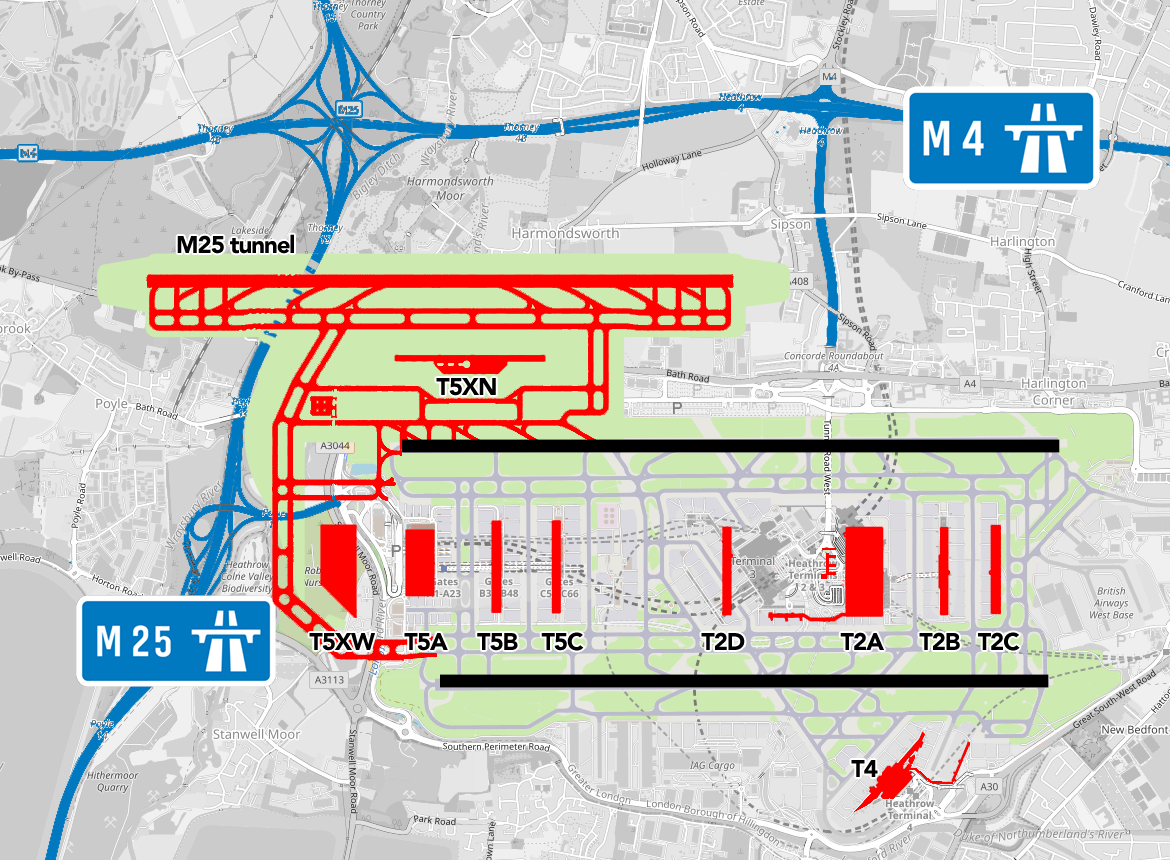
Outline map of the proposed expansion with new terminal buildings and the M25 tunnel

As well as the construction of a third runway, the plan includes:

- A new terminal called T5X to be built, whilst expanding Terminal 2 and opening three new satellite terminals, with Terminal 3 to close.
- Enhancement of local rail connections, and walking and cycling routes.
- Realigning and widening the M25 between junctions 14 and 15, diverting it 130m to the west via a new road tunnel under the airport.
- Diverting several neighbouring roads including the A4 and A3044 around the north of the expanded airport boundary.
- Creation of two new Heathrow parkways.
- Improvements to Heathrow's bus and coach stations.
- Potential integration of the proposed Western Rail Approach to Heathrow and Heathrow Southern Railway.

The total estimated cost is £49 billion: £21 billion for the third runway (which includes procuring the land and altering the M25 motorway), £12 billion to build the new terminal, and £15 billion to modernise the airport's infrastructure. According to Heathrow, the expansion could contribute an additional 0.43% to UK GDP.

In September 2026, government sources told The Daily Telegraph that the 2035 target was unrealistic, and the current expectation was to obtain planning permission by 2029 and for the runway to become operational in 2039.

=== 2025 Arora Group proposal ===
A rival "Heathrow West" proposal was put forward in 2025 by the Arora Group, a large landowner in the area. It proposed a shorter runway of around 2,800m (9,200 ft) which would avoid rerouting the M25. Its total cost was estimated at approximately £25 billion. The proposal was rejected by the government in favour of the plans submitted by Heathrow Airport Limited.

== Support ==
=== Reasons for expansion ===
The principal argument stated in favour of expanding Heathrow is to enhance the economic growth of the UK. As the UK's major hub airport, Heathrow can attract many transfer passengers, and so can support a wide range of direct flight destinations at high frequencies. In 2009 it was the world's second busiest airport, based on numbers of international passengers. The government stated in 2003 that Heathrow's connectivity helps London (and nearby counties) compete with other European cities for business investment, which in turn produces economic benefits for the rest of the UK. The transport secretary stated in 2009 that "additional capacity at Heathrow is critical to this country’s long term economic prosperity".

The government's argument in 2009 was that Heathrow was on the brink of suffering a decline in connectivity. Heathrow's runways were operating at around 99% capacity, which increases delays when flights are disrupted, and risks competing European airports gaining destinations (at Heathrow's loss). The government estimated that building a third runway would allow Heathrow to increase its connectivity, bringing £5.5bn of economic benefits over the period 2020–2080. However, the British Chambers of Commerce estimated the economic benefits to be £30 billion for the UK economy over the same timescale, and has also stated that every year the programme is delayed costs the UK between £900 million and £1.1 billion.

Some of the capacity added to Heathrow by the new third runway could be used to reinstate or improve flight connections to UK cities. Several cities saw their connections to Heathrow reduced or lost in the early years of the 21st century, as airlines have reallocated the airport's limited capacity to more profitable long-haul flights.

It was suggested in 2009 that a third runway would increase Heathrow's resilience to disruption, and so reduce emissions from aircraft waiting to land. Construction was estimated to provide up to 60,000 jobs, and operating the expanded airport was expected to create up to 8,000 new jobs at Heathrow by 2030, with multiplier benefits to West London.

=== Supporters ===
The UK's Brown ministry (2007–2010) took the lead in driving forward the expansion of Heathrow. The particular members of that government most closely associated with that drive were the prime minister Gordon Brown and past Transport Secretaries Alistair Darling, Ruth Kelly, Geoff Hoon and Andrew Adonis. Peter Mandelson, the then Business Secretary, also voiced his support for the scheme.

Former Chancellor George Osborne was a vocal proponent of the expansion, and urged Theresa May's Conservative government to support the plan from at least 2016. By 2018, the government gained a cross-party voting majority of 296 in favour of the third runway.

The stance of both Labour and the Conservatives was broadly supported by a number of groups and prominent individuals:

- Aviation sector: including BAA Limited and Flying Matters.
- Airlines: including All Nippon Airways, British Airways, Delta Air Lines, easyJet, Singapore Airlines and Virgin Atlantic.
- Airports: including Glasgow Airport, Liverpool John Lennon Airport, Leeds Bradford Airport, Newcastle International Airport and Aberdeen Airport.
- Business organisations: Confederation of British Industry, British Chambers of Commerce and 32 local chambers of commerce, including the London Chamber of Commerce and West London Business.
- Local authorities: Slough
- Manufacturing & freight sector: including the Freight Transport Association, the British International Freight Association, the EEF, Segro and Black & Decker.
- Trade unions: including the GMB Union, Trades Union Congress and Unite the Union.

However, since November 2022, the CEO of Virgin Atlantic Shai Weiss indicated a pause in the company's support for the expansion of Heathrow, announcing support had moved from 'unequivocal' to 'tentative', mentioning Heathrow's increase of passenger charges as a reason.

In August 2025, EasyJet stated that it would start serving Heathrow once a third runway is complete.

=== Advocacy in support of expansion ===
In May 2007, the British Airports Authority (BAA) and several other companies involved with aviation established Flying Matters to lobby the UK government and generally advocate for the development of the airport, following a suggestion from Sir Richard Branson of Virgin Atlantic that the aviation industry needed to develop a shared solution to climate change. The organisation was created to help demonstrate that the aviation sector was "taking climate change seriously". In 2009 Greenpeace acquired and published a detailed confidential report into the group's activities and plans which claimed that The Department for Transport was independently approaching Flying Matters for support on key issues on the Climate Change bill.

Prior to the 2007 party conferences, Flying Matters issued a number of press releases aimed at the Conservative Party which challenged its opposition to the third runway. The objectives outlined in the leaked 'draft Strategy and programme for 2009–10' later confirmed that the organisation felt that it was "Essential to help establish a foundation from which the Conservatives could amend their position post election". The organisation's budget for 2008–2009 was £390,000.

=== Lobbying ===
The aviation sector had close links with political decision-makers, with people moving between roles through the controversial 'revolving door'. For example: Joe Irvin was an advisor to John Prescott from 1996 and 2001 (Secretary of State for the Environment, Transport and the Regions as well as Deputy Prime Minister) before working for various elements of the aviation lobby and becoming head of corporate affairs at BAA in 2006; he became 'Special Advisor' to Gordon Brown in 2007 when he became prime minister. He was succeeded at BAA by Tom Kelly who took the title 'group director of corporate and public affairs' and had been official spokesman for Tony Blair when he was prime minister.

A pressure group 'Freedom to Fly', fronted by Irvin, was formed during the preparation phase of the "Future of Aviation white paper 2003" by BAA and others.

== Opposition ==
=== Greenhouse gas emissions ===
Environmental objections have included that the increased CO_{2} emissions caused by the additional flights will add to global warming. They have argued that claimed economic benefits would be more than wiped out by the cost of the CO_{2} emissions. The government estimated that a third runway would generate an extra 210.8 Mt (million tons) CO_{2} annually, but in cost-benefits analysis costs this at £13.33 per ton using 2006 prices, giving a 2020–2080 "cost" of £2.8bn. This is a small fraction of the government's own official estimate of the cost of carbon, which rises from £32.90 in 2020 to £108.20 in 2080 (in 2007 prices). If these figures are used, the carbon cost of the third runway alone rises to £13.3bn (2006 prices), enough to wipe out the economic benefits. However, the British Chambers of Commerce released a report stating the economic benefits as £30 billion over the same time scale, considerably more than the carbon cost of the expansion.

The World Development Movement has said that the proposed additional flights from Heathrow's third runway would emit the same amount of CO_{2} as the whole of Kenya. However, the then Transport Secretary Ruth Kelly stated that carbon emissions would not rise overall in the environment, since carbon trading would be used to ensure that these increases from Heathrow were offset by reductions elsewhere in the economy.

=== Community destruction ===
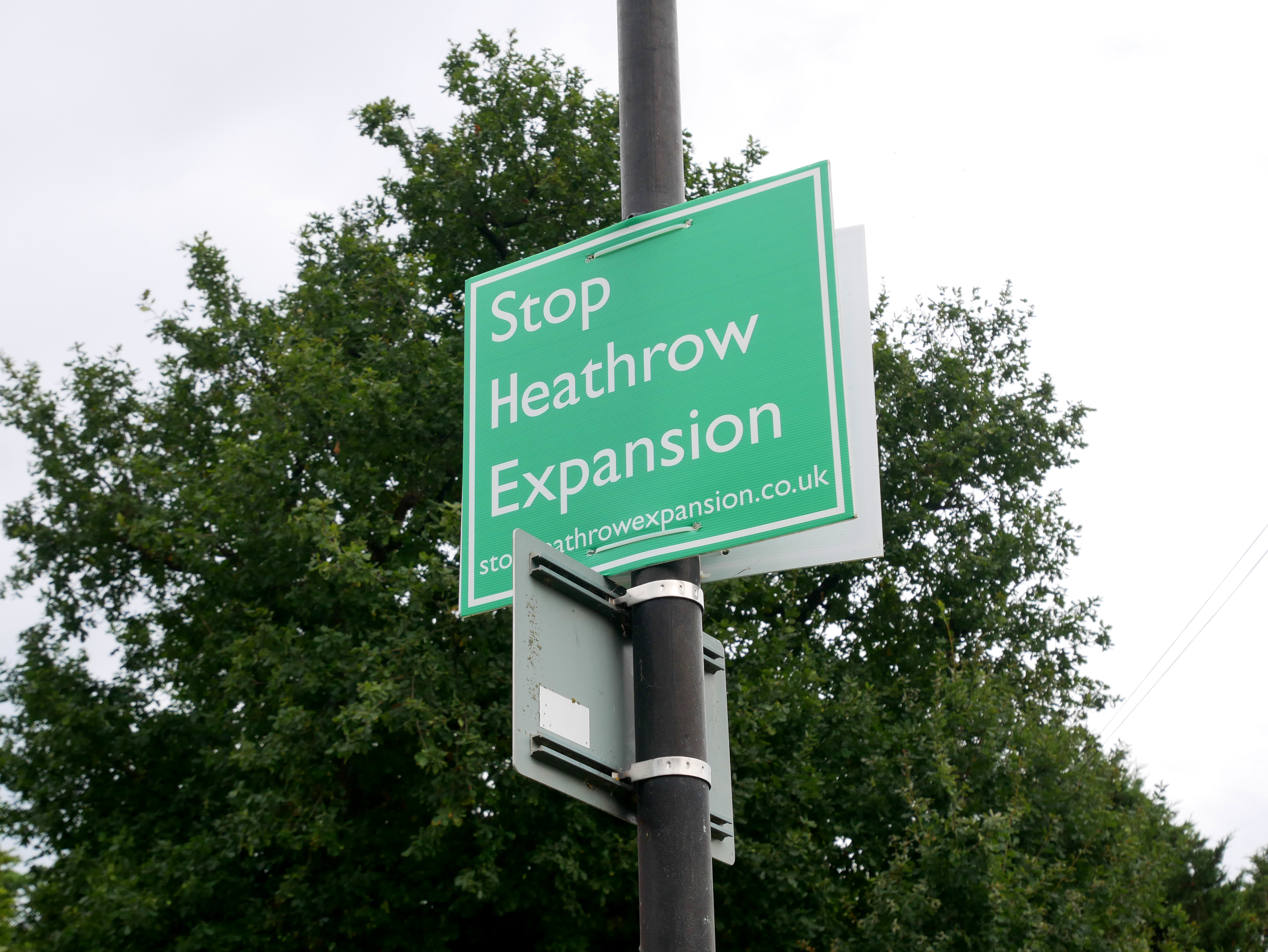
A "Stop Heathrow Expansion" placard in Harmondsworth, a village that would be partially demolished by the expansion

In 2007, critics responded to the early expansion proposals which would have encroached upon the nearby villages of Harmondsworth and Sipson. They expressed concerns that around 1,600 people would be displaced from their homes, around 700 houses, a church and numerous public buildings would have to be demolished, and that Sipson would disappear entirely. John McDonnell, MP for Hayes and Harlington, said that the number of homes to be demolished would be closer to 4,000. The aviation minister Jim Fitzpatrick defended the plans, saying anyone losing their home as a result of expansion would be fully compensated. BAA has committed to preserving the Grade I-listed parish church and Great Barn at Harmondsworth, and has given assurances that the value of properties affected by a possible third runway will be protected.

=== Noise pollution ===
Building a third runway at Heathrow would expose hundreds of thousands of residents in London and Berkshire to sustained high levels of aircraft noise for the first time.

=== Opponents of expansion ===
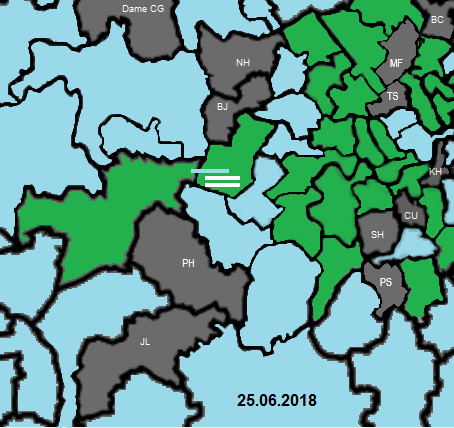
Seats of opposing MPs in green, supporting in light blue (and 12 absent or abstaining in grey) in this map of c. 30 miles, square, on 25 June 2018

Three House of Commons-represented political parties, many advocacy groups, associations and prominent people have expressed opposition to expansion at times during its development. Notably:

- Plaid Cymru (including its five MPs at the time of the June 2018 vote on whether to approve the National Policy Statement)
- The Liberal Democrats (including thus all 11 MPs at the June 2018 vote, however it gained six MPs from defections of which five voted for expansion in 2018).
- The Green Party.
- London Labour MPs: Rosena Allin-Khan, Diane Abbott, Dawn Butler, Lyn Brown, Karen Buck, Ruth Cadbury, Jeremy Corbyn, Marsha De Cordova, Jon Cruddas, John Cryer, Janet Daby, Emma Dent Coad, Clive Efford, Barry Gardiner, Helen Hayes, Kate Hoey, Rupa Huq, Sarah Jones, John McDonnell, Kate Osamor, Teresa Pearce, Matthew Pennycook, Steve Reed, Ellie Reeves, Andy Slaughter, Keir Starmer, Emily Thornberry, Catherine West
- London Conservative MPs: Bob Blackman, Zac Goldsmith, Justine Greening, Greg Hands, Matthew Offord, and Theresa Villiers. The 2018 vote drew five absences/abstentions from others in the nineteen.
- Sadiq Khan, the Mayor of London, and his predecessors, Boris Johnson and Ken Livingstone.
- International campaign groups criticising expansion of fossil-fuel powered passenger aviation (foremost group: Plane Stupid) and local anti-aviation impacts groups (foremost group: Hacan ClearSkies).
- 24 local authorities (including the London Borough of Hillingdon)
- Environmental campaign groups: Greenpeace, RSPB, Friends of the Earth and WWF
- The National Trust
- Developmental charities: Oxfam, Christian Aid

=== Advocacy against expansion ===
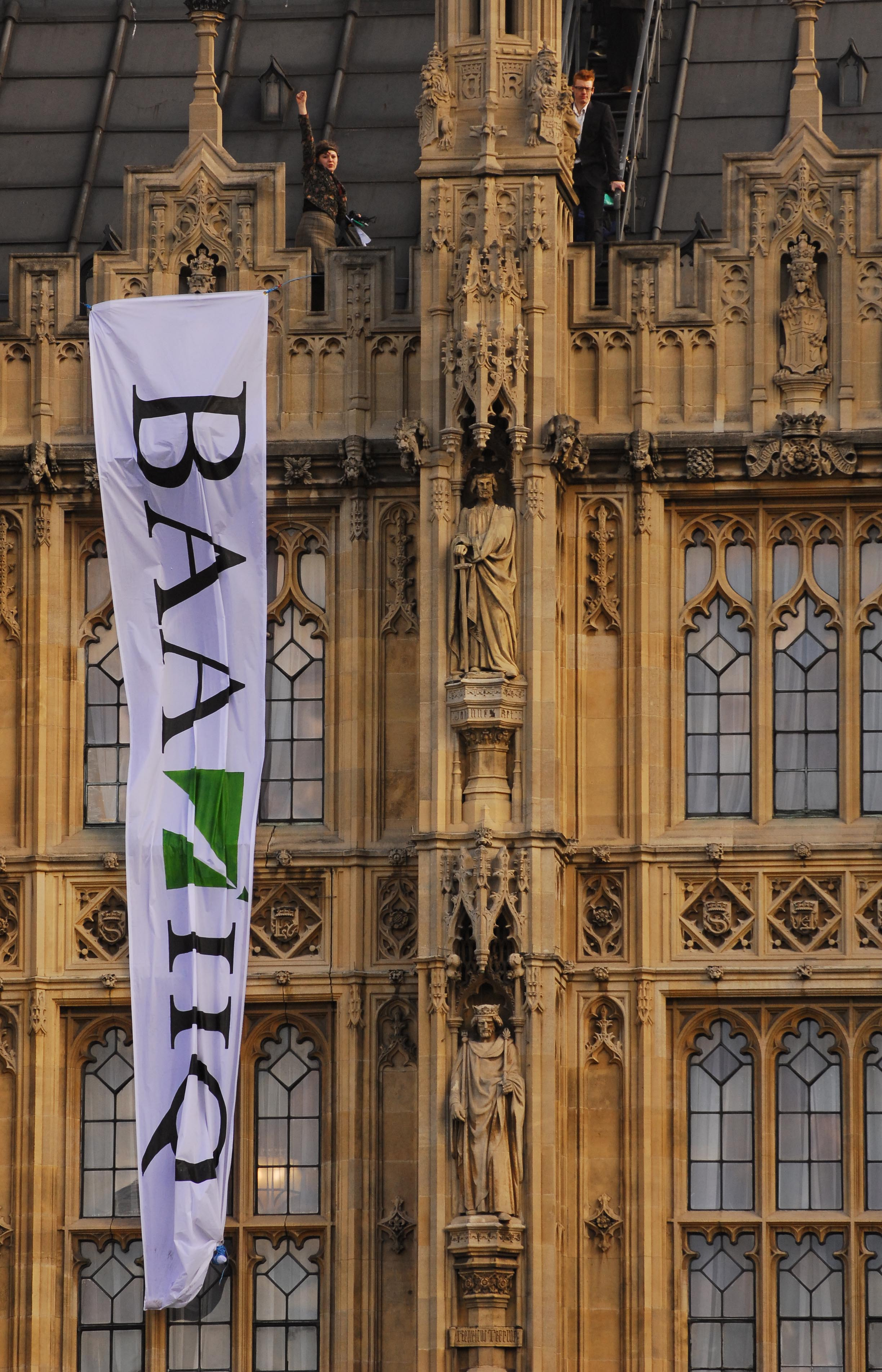
Plane Stupid activists on the roof of the Palace of Westminster in 2008 complaining about BAA's close links with government

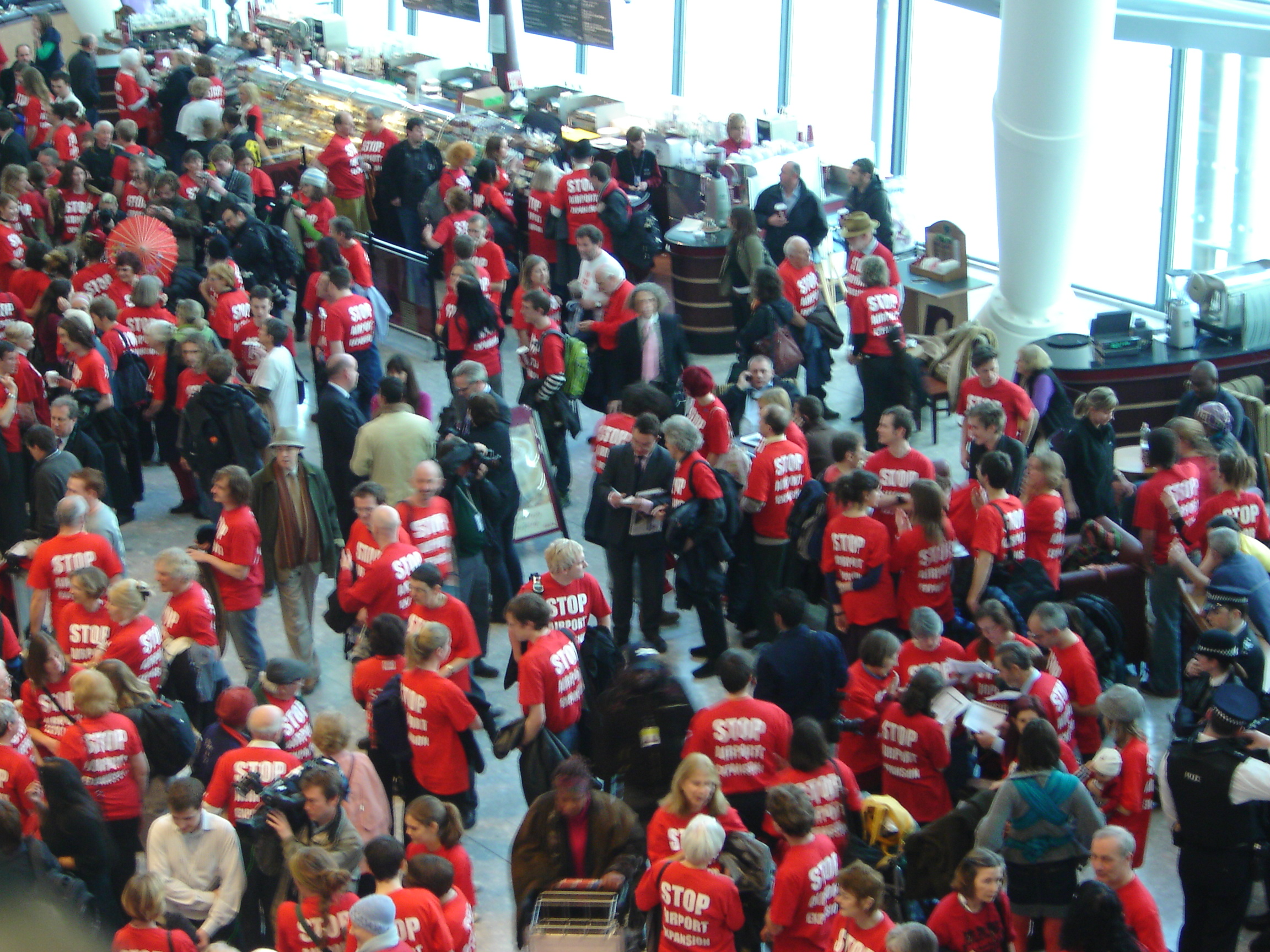
On the day of Terminal 5's opening hundreds of protesters descended on Heathrow in red Stop Heathrow Expansion T-shirts. The protest was kept out of the news by Terminal 5's opening day baggage system problem.

The Conservatives and Liberal Democrats opposed construction, and cancelled expansion after the 2010 general election.

In August 2007, the Camp for Climate Action took place within a mile of Heathrow. The camp ran for a week and on its final day some 1000–1400 people protested and 200 people blockaded the British Airports Authority HQ. Before the camp, BAA requested the "mother of all injunctions" which could have restricted the movements of 5 million people from 15 organisations, including the RSPB, Greenpeace, the Campaign for the Protection of Rural England, the Woodland Trust, Friends of the Earth, and the National Trust. The injunction would technically have included the Queen; patron of the RSPB and CPRE, Prince Charles in his position as President of the National Trust; and even some of BAA's own staff.

In February 2008, five members of Plane Stupid who have resisted expansion throughout the process staged a 2-hour protest on the roof of the Palace of Westminster (Houses of Parliament) in protest at the close links between BAA and the government. Two large banners were unfurled which read "BAA HQ" and "No 3rd runway at Heathrow".

In April 2008, Plane Stupid claimed that their group was infiltrated by Toby Kendall, 24, an employee of C2i International. The Times reported that he had gone undercover in the group using the name of "Ken Tobias". Airport operator, BAA, who have often been a target of Plane Stupid's campaign, confirmed to The Times that they had been in contact with C2i International but denied ever hiring the company. C2i offered their clients "The ability to operate effectively and securely in a variety of hostile environments" and at the time had 'aerospace' at the top of a list of industries for which it worked.

Certificate of beneficial ownership issued by Greenpeace in respect of the Airplot at Sipson.

In January 2009, Greenpeace and partners (including actress Emma Thompson and impressionist Alistair McGowan) bought a piece of land on the site of the proposed third runway called Airplot. Their aim is to maximise the opportunities to put legal obstacles in the way of expansion. Although this action is similar to the tactics first employed in the early 1980s by FoE with the 'Alice's Meadow' campaign, it differs in that it relies on the concept of multiple beneficial ownership rather than the division of the field into microplots. The field was bought for an undisclosed sum from a local landowner. In the same month, Climate Rush staged a "picnic protest" at Heathrow airport against the construction of the third runway. Hundreds of people attended the protest, dressed in Edwardian period dress. In the same month the glass doors of the Department for Transport were broken by members of the organisation.

In March 2009, senior MPs demanded a Commons investigation into evidence of a "revolving door" policy between Downing Street, Whitehall and BAA Limited.

Also in March 2009, Plane Stupid protester Leila Deen threw green custard over the then Business Secretary, Peter Mandelson, at a low carbon summit hosted by Gordon Brown, in protest at the frequent meetings between Roland Rudd, who represents airport operator BAA, and Mandelson and other ministers in the run-up to Labour's decision to go ahead with plans for a third runway at Heathrow.

Hounslow Council examined the possibility of legal action to prevent expansion, with the support of other London councils and the mayor (Boris Johnson).

In February 2010, The Daily Telegraph reported that the Department for Transport was being investigated by the Information Commissioner's Office and could face a criminal investigation over allegations that it may have deleted or concealed emails to prevent them from being disclosed under the Freedom of Information Act 2000. The investigation followed a complaint by Justine Greening MP.

In March 2010 campaigners "won a High Court battle" when Lord Justice Carnwath ruled that the government's policy support for a third runway would need to be looked at again, and called for a review "of all the relevant policy issues, including the impact of climate change policy". The Department for Transport vowed to "robustly defend" the third runway plan. Following the announcement, Gordon Brown, the prime minister, said it was the right decision, that it was "vital not just to our national economy, but enables millions of citizens to keep in touch with their friends and families" and that the judgement would not change the government's plans.

On 6 August 2018, lawyers for Friends of the Earth filed papers at the High Court asking for the airport's National Policy Statement (NPS) to be quashed. Friends of the Earth argued that the NPS constitutes a breach of the UK's climate change policy and its sustainable development duties.

== Alternatives to expansion ==
The main suggested alternatives to Heathrow expansion included:

- greater use of regional airports in the UK
- a new airport elsewhere
- greater use of rail travel (including on the High Speed 2 line) to reduce domestic flights

=== Greater use of regional airports ===
The United Kingdom has a number of regional airports, which it had been argued can be utilised further to reduce the airport capacity strain on South East England and benefit the whole of the United Kingdom. The 2003 Aviation White Paper mainly argued that increased use of regional airports would increase airport capacity in South East England; and the 2010 coalition government concurred with this view. Politicians proposing this plan included Theresa Villiers and John Leech. Business leaders to back the plan include bosses at Birmingham and Cardiff Airports. The CEO of Manchester Airports Group, the largest British-owned operator of airports and member of the influential Aviation Foundation along with Virgin Atlantic, British Airways and BAA Limited, has also proposed greater use of regional airports.

A number of airline bosses expressed their dissatisfaction at the over-emphasis on the South East in aviation policy. Laurie Berryman of Emirates said in 2013 that "The business community doesn't want to come to Heathrow or the South East. They would rather fly long-haul from their local airport." A number of airlines have filled in the gap when British Airways have left regional airports over the past decade.

Another major issue at regional airports was "leakage", or passengers who need to get connecting flights from a regional airport to an international airport. Manchester Airport is by far the busiest and largest airport outside South East England, with two runways. Four million passengers – about 20% of all passengers – need to fly from Manchester to London to get connecting long-haul flights abroad. Likewise, many more millions fly from other regional airports to connecting flights in London. Advocates argue that flying to international destinations directly from regional airports would immediately create more airport capacity in the South East at a fraction of the cost and time of having a build a new runway or airport. Furthermore, numerous regional airports are underused, and need no immediate expense to take on more passengers. Manchester is the only airport in the United Kingdom other than Heathrow to have two runways and is severely under capacity: Manchester carries 20 million passengers, but has the capacity to carry at least 50 million.

Proponents of this idea also suggest the new High Speed 2 network will be vital to the success of regional airports in the future. HS2 will link the three airports of Birmingham, Manchester and East Midlands with London. Furthermore, journey times will be competitive: a journey from London Euston to Birmingham Airport will be less than 50 minutes, and to Manchester about 65 minutes – in comparison, the Heathrow Express service to London Paddington takes 15 minutes. Currently rail links exist from London Euston to Birmingham International which takes about 70 minutes, whilst journeys to Manchester take over two hours with a change required at Manchester Piccadilly. It was hoped airlines would create a "north-south hub" with more flights from Manchester, with passengers who live or work in London being only an hour away from the airport – thus spreading demand to regional airports and creating more international hub capacity in the South East.

=== Thames Estuary Airport ===
Since the 1970s, there have been various proposals to complement or replace Heathrow by a new airport in the Thames Estuary. This would have the advantage of avoiding flights taking off and landing over London, with all the accompanying noise and pollution, and would avoid destroying homes, nature and amenity land on the western edge of London. In November 2008, the Mayor of London, Boris Johnson, announced a feasibility study into building an airport on an artificial island off the Isle of Sheppey.

Critics pointed variously to the construction costs, threat to jobs at Heathrow, and opponents in green ideology as with all expansion cite increased CO_{2} emissions if more flights are scheduled than at present.

Following an election pledge not to build a third runway, Prime Minister David Cameron was keen to implement the Thames Estuary hub. However, airlines spoke out against plans to partially fund the airport with around £8 billion in landing charges from Heathrow. An aviation review was set for the end of 2012 and Cameron had advised: "I do understand it is vitally important that we maintain the sort of hub status that Britain has. There are lots of different options that can be looked at."

=== High-speed rail ===
The three main parties represented within the UK support a high-speed railway to the north.

- In September 2008, the Conservative opposition proposed such a northern railway and suggested that it would reduce the need for short-haul flights, by encouraging passengers to complete their journey by train instead of flying. By pruning short-haul flights from Heathrow, international flights could increase and so connectivity would be enhanced. The reduction could be 66,430 domestic flights per year, or 30% of the capacity of the third runway.
- In March 2010, in the final months of the Labour government, it published detailed plans for High Speed 2 which would link London with Birmingham and then Scotland, incorporating a new Old Oak Common railway station in West London which would 'improve surface access by rail to Heathrow Airport.' (Note: DfT (2009a), page 17 paragraph 41) (Note: DfT (2009a), pages 12–16 paragraphs 32–37) Some "modal shift " to rail from road and air was expected, (Note: DfT (2009a), page 18 paragraph 47) but not for passengers who arrived at Heathrow by air, who were likely to continue to go by air to their UK destination.

== See also ==
- 2016 Richmond Park by-election
- Environmental impact of aviation
- Environmental effects of aviation in the United Kingdom
- Heathrow Airport transport proposals
