= Airports Commission =

United Kingdom independent commission

The Airports Commission was an independent commission established in September 2012 by the Government of the United Kingdom to consider how the UK could "maintain its status as an international hub for aviation and immediate actions to improve the use of existing runway capacity in the next 5 years". Alongside the proposal to build HS2, the question of how to make best use of and expand airport capacity had become the UK's most significant infrastructure issue over the preceding few years.

The five person commission, which was chaired by the economist Sir Howard Davies and reported to the Department for Transport (DfT), produced an Interim Report in December 2013 and delivered a Final Report in July 2015. It unanimously concluded in favour of a new northwest runway at Heathrow Airport.

== Background ==
=== Expansion of London's airports ===
London, with six commercial airports in its metropolitan area, has the world's busiest airports system. However the question of how to expand the capacity of the system to cope with growing air travel demand is an issue that successive governments have failed to address since the 1950s. A previous commission – the Commission on the Third London Airport chaired by Eustace Roskill – sat between 1968 and 1971 and recommended that a site at Cublington in Buckinghamshire (to the north west of London) should be developed as London's third airport. A member of the commission, Colin Buchanan, wrote a dissenting report and recommended that an airport should be developed at Foulness (later known as Maplin Sands). The Government accepted Buchanan's report and an Act of Parliament was passed – the Maplin Development Act 1973 – that paved the way for a Thames Estuary Airport at Maplin. However the project was cancelled in 1974 in the wake of the 1973 oil crisis and the existing airport at Stansted (which was not shortlisted by the Roskill Commission) was subsequently developed as London's third airport.

Since the 1980s finding solutions to address the shortage of airport capacity has become more difficult because of the growth and development of Heathrow Airport as the UK's only hub airport, as opposed to all other UK airports which are based on the point-to-point airport operating model. The provision of additional capacity at major point-to-point airports, such as Gatwick or Stansted, would not address the UK's shortage of hub airport capacity. In 1978 the Traffic Distribution Rules were introduced to try to encourage British Airways (BA) to make greater use of Gatwick Airport as a second hub. However, in 1991, having incurred significant financial losses, BA ceased most of its operations from the airport. Today, Stansted—despite having very low landing charges—operates at less than 50% capacity and is home to a completely different set of low-cost airlines compared to the full-service airlines which operate at Heathrow.

Heathrow has been unable to expand to meet the rapid growth in demand for air travel and in particular from transfer passengers on which hub airports depend. This inability to expand has been due to a combination of:

1. the airport's location to the west of London and the UK's prevailing southwesterly winds, meaning that aircraft mainly approach the airport over Central London; and
2. the level of dense urban development surrounding the airport.

These factors result in significant noise and air quality impacts for local residents and pose a major safety risk. As a result, there is widespread local opposition to the expansion of the airport even though many local people benefit from it in terms of employment. In part due to this issue, there are also a large number of marginal Parliamentary constituencies located around the airport meaning that whenever one of the two main political parties (Labour or Conservatives) develop a proposal or project to expand the airport, it is guaranteed to be opposed by the other party.

A number of such proposals and projects have been proposed over the years, but these have all been cancelled at a later date due to a lack of national political consensus. Heathrow's inability to expand means that the airport has been operating its two runways at about 98% capacity since 2003.

Heathrow traffic statistics

As a result, its status as a global hub airport has been declining in terms of the growth in passenger numbers and number of destinations served, compared to its competitor hub airports in Europe (Schiphol, Paris and Frankfurt) and in relation to the recent rapid growth of Middle Eastern airports (Istanbul, Dubai, Abu Dhabi and Doha).

=== Heathrow third runway ===
The Labour Government's 2003 Aviation White Paper The Future of Air Transport proposed that a third runway (R3) should be built at Heathrow, albeit with restrictions on the number of additional air traffic movements at the airport. The publication of specific plans for the extra runway was delayed until 2009 because of the public inquiry into the construction of a fifth terminal. However, by this time the 2010 general election was only a year away and the then opposition Conservative Party, eager to secure a political advantage, vigorously opposed R3 and vowed to cancel the project if they won the election.

Analysis proves the outcome of the 2010 election was influenced by the rejection of Heathrow's 3rd runway. Conservatives formed a Coalition Government with the Liberal Democrats, who opposed all airport expansion, and R3 was immediately cancelled. Current research has revealed various reasons to further reduce flights at Heathrow, such as study undertaken in 2012 by MIT who presented evidence in a feasibility study on the fatal impacts of pollution across a wide spread area over London. The evidence suggests that another runway would increase fatalities by pollution 3 times the current amount.

=== Recent global connectivity concerns ===
Since 2010 there have been growing concerns that the lack of UK hub airport runway capacity is preventing the UK from establishing additional air connections to fast growing emerging economies and is harming the economy. London Mayor Boris Johnson – who strongly opposes expansion of Heathrow and was at the time widely tipped to succeed David Cameron as Conservative Party leader – and leading architect Norman Foster has proposed a landbased estuarine scheme on the Isle of Grain, as well as a consortium of professionals TESTRAD proposing a new airport in the Thames Estuary. In addition the management of Heathrow and business groups have started to campaign for additional runway capacity, whether at Heathrow or elsewhere.

== Purpose of the commission ==
The government hoped that by establishing an independent commission it would be able to secure cross-party political consensus over the issue of how to expand London's airports. In particular it hoped that the commission's recommendations would be accepted by all political parties and as a result could be implemented by the newly elected government when the commission publishes its final report in Summer 2015.

== Terms of reference and commissioners ==
On 2 November 2012 Secretary of State for Transport Patrick McLoughlin announced in a written statement to Parliament the terms of reference for the commission and the names of six commissioners who had been appointed by the government:

=== Terms of reference ===
- The commission will examine the scale and timing of any requirement for additional capacity to maintain the UK's position as Europe's most important aviation hub; and it will identify and evaluate how any need for additional capacity should be met in the short, medium and long term.
- It should maintain a UK-wide perspective, taking appropriate account of the national, regional and local implications of any proposals.
- It should engage openly with interested parties and members of the public, providing opportunities to submit evidence and proposals and to set out views relevant to its work.
- It should seek to engage with a range of stakeholders, including with local and devolved government as well as the opposition, to build consensus in support of its approach and recommendations.
- The commission should report no later than the end of 2013 on:

- its assessment of the evidence on the nature, scale and timing of the steps needed to maintain the UK’s global hub status
- its recommendation(s) for immediate actions to improve the use of existing runway capacity in the next five years – consistent with credible long term options

- The assessments and recommendations in the commission's interim report should be underpinned by a detailed review of the evidence in relation to the current position in the UK with regard to aviation demand and connectivity, forecasts for how these are likely to develop, and the expected future pattern of the UK's requirements for international and domestic connectivity.
- Its assessments of potential immediate actions should take into account their economic, social and environmental costs and benefits, and their operational deliverability. It should also be informed by an initial high-level assessment of the credible long-term options which merit further detailed development.
- The commission should report no later than summer 2015 on:

- its assessment of the options for meeting the UK’s international connectivity needs, including their economic, social and environmental impact
- its recommendation(s) for the optimum approach to meeting any needs
- its recommendation(s) for ensuring that the need is met as expeditiously as practicable within the required timescale

- The commission should base the recommendations in its final report on a detailed consideration of the case for each of the credible options. This should include the development or examination of detailed business cases and environmental assessments for each option, as well as consideration of their operational, commercial and technical viability.
- As part of its final report in summer 2015, it should also provide materials, based on this detailed analysis, which will support the government in preparing a national policy statement to accelerate the resolution of any future planning applications for major airports infrastructure.

=== Commissioners ===
- Sir Howard Davies (chairman)
- Sir John Armitt – former chief executive officer (CEO) of Network Rail and Chairman of the Olympic Delivery Authority
- Ricky Burdett – Professor of Urban Studies at the London School of Economics and director of the LSE Cities research centre
- Vivienne Cox – former CEO and Executive Vice-president of BP Alternative Energy
- Dame Julia King – a scientist and Vice-Chancellor of Aston University
- Geoff Muirhead – former CEO of Manchester Airports Group (MAG). Muirhead resigned from the commission in September 2013.

== Programme of work ==
=== Proposals ===
On 1 February 2013 the commission invited submissions for proposals to make best use of existing capacity in the short and medium term (proposals that could be implemented within five years) and to provide additional capacity in the longer term. Proponents had to confirm their intention to submit proposals by 28 February 2013. Short and medium term proposals had to be submitted to the commission by 17 May 2013. Longer term proposals, of no more than 40 pages, had to be submitted by 19 July 2013. In addition the commission requested suggestions for sifting criteria to be used in developing the Interim Report by 15 March 2013.

In May 2013 the commission published its sift criteria against which longer term capacity proposals would be assessed. The commission envisaged that a small number of preferred proposals would be short listed for further study during 2014 and 2015 in its Interim Report in December 2013. The outcome of those studies would enable the commission to recommend a preferred location for additional hub airport capacity.

The commission has received and published 70 short/medium term proposals and 58 long term proposals from existing airports, architects, developers, engineers, other organisations and members of the public.

Sir Howard has acknowledged that the number of proposals received was more than the commission had envisaged.

=== Discussion papers ===
To inform its work, the commission has published discussion papers on:

- aviation demand forecasting;
- connectivity and economy;
- aviation noise;
- airport business operating models; and
- aviation and climate change.

The commission sought stakeholder comments on these papers and has published the technical and non-technical responses that it has received.

The Commission published a sixth discussion paper calling for evidence on the Utilisation of the UK's Existing Airport Capacity in June 2014.

The Commission published its seventh discussion paper on the Delivery of New Runway Capacity on 1 July 2014.

=== Evidence sessions ===
The commission held evidence sessions in London and Manchester in July 2013 and published the transcripts and other documents presented in those sessions.

=== Meetings and Visits ===
The commission has had meetings with a wide range of stakeholders and has held briefings with Members of Parliament and Local Authorities. The commission has also undertaken a programme of visits to UK and international airports, to the Isle of Grain and to the Heathrow and Gatwick areas to meet local political representation and residents groups.

=== Emerging thinking ===
On 7 October 2013 Sir Howard gave a speech in which he set out the emerging thinking of the commission. Their main findings to date were that additional runway capacity would be needed in the longer term and that it should be provided within the South East of England. Whilst regional airports have an important role of play in the UK's airports system, they would be unable to provide the capacity that is needed in the South East.

Sir Howard also said that:

- the commission will short list up to five options, rather than sites, in its Interim Report;
- alongside the Interim Report, a draft appraisal framework, that will be used to assess options, will be published for consultation. A final appraisal framework will be published in March 2014;
- short listed scheme promoters will be asked to work with the commission to develop business cases between April and August 2014 (the commission had previously indicated that the studies would last for 18 months). The business cases must be developed to a level of detail that will enable DfT to produce a draft National Policy Statement by December 2015;
- the commission will continue to engage with the leaders of the main political parties;
- the commission will hold a public consultation about the five options between October and December 2014 and will encourage scheme promoters to do likewise in the local area for their proposed scheme;
- the commission may also hold further evidence sessions;
- the commission will go into purdah between December 2014 and June 2015 to avoid becoming involved in the General Election. Sir Howard expects that the commission's work will not be mentioned in the election manifestos;
- the commission's Final Report will be published as soon as possible after the general election and will only recommend 'one option' for further capacity;
- there is a strong possibility of a Judicial Review after the Interim Report is published, but he does not think that this will delay the process much.

Sir Howard invited the public to submit responses to the commission about these findings.

=== Interim Report ===
The Commission published its Interim Report and associated appendices, and consultants reports on 17 December 2013. A transcript of the stakeholder briefing on the Interim Report held at the Institute of Civil Engineers on the morning of publication and chaired by Sir Howard was later published alongside the other documents.

The report sets out the commission's assessment of the UK's future aviation capacity need and concluded that one net new additional runway would be required in London and south east England by 2030.

The Commission shortlisted three proposals to deliver additional capacity: A proposal from Heathrow Airport Ltd for an additional runway to the NW of the existing runways; a proposal from Heathrow Hub Ltd for a new runway to the west of the existing northern runway; and a proposal from Gatwick Airport Ltd for a second runway to the south of the existing runway. The Interim Report committed the commission to publish an Appraisal Framework setting out how it will assess each of the short listed options.

The report contained a package of recommendations to the UK Government to make the best use of existing airport capacity:

- An 'Optimisation Strategy' to improve the operational efficiency of UK airports and airspace, including: Airport Collaborative Decision Making; airspace changes supporting performance based navigation; enhanced en-route traffic management to drive tighter adherence to schedules; and Time Based Separation.
- Trials at Heathrow of measures to smooth the early morning arrival schedule to minimise stacking and delays and to provide more predictable respite for local people.
- The establishment of a Senior Delivery Group to drive forward the implementation of the Future Airspace Strategy and the delivery of the commission's recommendations.
- The creation of an Independent Aviation Noise Authority to provide expert and impartial advice about the noise impacts of aviation and to facilitate the delivery of future improvements to airspace operations.
- A package of surface transport improvements to make airports with spare capacity more attractive to airlines and passengers, including: the enhancement of Gatwick Airport Station; further work to develop a strategy for enhancing Gatwick's Road and Rail Access; work on developing proposals to improve the rail link between London and Stansted; work to provide rail access into Heathrow from the South; and, the provision of smart ticketing facilities at airport stations.

In this report the Commission said it would undertake further work before deciding whether to add an airport in the inner Thames Estuary to its shortlist.

=== Inner Thames Estuary Studies ===
On 27 March 2014, after consultation, the Commission published the terms of reference for the additional work it would undertake on an inner Thames Estuary proposal.

The additional work comprises four studies:

- Study 1: Environmental / Natura 2000 impacts.
- Study 2: Operational feasibility and attitudes to moving to a new airport
- Study 3: Socio-economic impacts
- Study 4: Surface access impacts

Between 4 and 10 July 2014 the Commission published the reports from each of the four studies for public comment.

On 2 July 2014 the commission announced that it would not add a proposal for an airport in the inner Thames Estuary to its shortlist of options for additional capacity. Alongside the announcement the Commission published a Summary and Decision paper setting out the reasons for its decision and the work it had undertaken to reach its decision.

=== Appraisal Framework ===
On 2 April 2014, after consultation, the Commission published its Appraisal Framework for assessing the three options for additional capacity shortlisted in the Interim Report.

The Appraisal Framework explains how the Commission expects scheme designs to be developed, and how it will appraise the schemes. The framework incorporates four elements:

- the commission's objectives, against which options will be assessed and on which its final recommendations will be based;
- an updated scheme design for each short-listed option, to be used as the starting point for appraisal;
- a business case and sustainability assessment for each option, incorporating the information needed to make informed assessments against the commission's objectives; and
- a set of appraisal modules explaining the methodologies that the Commission proposes to use in assessing options.

Annex B of the Appraisal Framework sets out how scheme promoters might present updated scheme designs of the shortlisted proposal to the Airports Commission.

=== Consultation ===
In its Interim Report the Commission committed to consult on its appraisal of the shortlisted options in autumn 2014.

The Commission published its consultation on 11 November 2014, to run for 12 weeks until midnight on 3 February 2015.

The consultation consists of a Consultation Document, outlining the high-level summary of the commission's appraisal of the three shortlisted schemes, with more detailed documentation below it including individual business cases and sustainability assessments, consultants' reports and technical analysis produced by the commission.

As part of the consultation the Commission said it will hold two public evidence sessions, in the Heathrow area, and the other in the Gatwick area.

== Reaction ==
The Conservative, Labour and Liberal Democratic parties have welcomed the establishment of the commission, although none of the parties has said unequivocally that it will fully accept and implement the commission's findings if it wins the 2015 general election. Labour's Shadow Transport Secretary Mary Creagh told the Financial Times that the party "is reserving the right to reject the recommendations of the Davies review of aviation."

The commission has also been welcomed by the UK aviation industry and business organisations, although there has been frustration at the length of time the commission will take to produce its Final Report.

== Controversies ==
=== Establishment of the commission ===
Although the commission mirrors the Third London Airport Commission, chaired by Eustace Roskill between 1968 and 1971, in recent years the UK Government has normally used independent commissions to address complex or technical issues, where specialist expertise is required, rather than policy issues such as the choice of where to provide more hub runway capacity. As a result, the government's decision to use a panel of unelected people to make a recommendation about such a wide-ranging and political decision has been criticised.

=== Date of final report ===
The government's terms of reference for the commission state that the commission's final report will be produced in Summer 2015 after the next general election. Many people have questioned this date because, without the commission's Final Report, the political parties contesting the election will be unable to state their policies to the electorate about the proposed expansion of airports in the South East of England.

In a House of Commons debate on the Transport Select Committee's Aviation Strategy report on 24 October 2013, John McDonnell the Labour Member of Parliament for Hayes and Harlington – an area adjacent to the airport – called the commission's timetable undemocratic and asked for the date of its Final Report to be brought forward to a date before the election. In response to McDonnell, Transport Minister Robert Goodwill said that the commission needed time to do its work and the government will not ask the commission to bring forward the date of its Final Report.

In a speech to the Confederation of British Industry, Labour's Shadow Chancellor Ed Balls said that it is Labour's view that the commission "should report before the general election and not after".

=== Geoff Muirhead ===
Following pressure from the campaign group Stop Stansted Expansion (SSE) during Summer 2013, Geoff Muirhead, the only member of the commission with experience of working in the aviation sector, resigned from the commission in September 2013 because of a perceived conflict of interest with his former role at MAG.

Muirhead resigned because although he had stepped down as CEO of MAG in 2010, he remained in an ambassadorial role (and paid £75,000 per year) at the company until January 2013 – two months after he had been appointed as a member of the commission. In February 2013 MAG subsequently bought Stansted Airport and in July 2013 MAG submitted two long term proposals to the commission – one for a second runway and the second for a four runway hub airport.

The DfT said that although there was no evidence whatsoever of bias, it was considered prudent for Muirhead to step aside and that no decision had been taken as to whether Muirhead will be replaced.

In October 2013 SSE launched a legal action for a Judicial Review in the High Court against the commission alleging bias because Muirhead had been involved in the development of the sift criteria that the commission will use to shortlist runway capacity options in December 2013. SSE's barrister Paul Stinchcombe QC argued that Muirhead's resignation was too late to "save the sift criteria proceedings" and that Muirhead had "tainted .... the Commission's activities by reason of apparent bias".

In a statement the Airports Commission said it "firmly rejects the claims made by Stop Stansted Expansion, and considers its processes to date to have been appropriate and robust. The commission’s sift criteria were informed by public consultation and incorporate a wide range of environmental, economic and social factors – including local environmental issues such as impacts on landscape and the built heritage. The sift criteria demonstrate the openness of the commission’s process, and the importance it has placed on an integrated and evidence-based approach to reaching its recommendations."

On 2 December Mrs Justice Patterson in the High Court ruled that there was no basis for a Judicial Review. While the Judge found that it was not wise for Muirhead to have remained as a Commissioner while still working for MAG, she said that there was no real possibility of apparent bias in the sift criteria. This was because:

- the commission had adopted a defensive strategy after legal proceedings had commenced
- that Muirhead had stood down from sections of a Commission meeting on 4 September 2013 that dealt with benefits to airports; and
- that any decisions made in that meeting were only provisional.

The Judge ordered SSE to pay the commission's legal costs, but was critical of the commission for not being more transparent about Muirhead's work for MAG.

In response, SSE said that the legal action had achieved its main objective of removing Muirhead from the commission and that it would consider whether to appeal the decision.

=== Howard Davies ===
In 2009, Sir Howard Davies had been appointed as advisor to the Investment Strategy Committee of GIC Private Limited, formerly known as Government Investment Corporation of Singapore, and in 2011 he had joined its International Advisory Board. Davies resigned from both positions in September 2012, on his appointment to chair the Airports Commission (as GIC Private Limited was, at the time, as it still is, one of Heathrow's principal owners and cheerleaders for Heathrow's expansion). Davies recorded neither of these remunerated interests, when invited to complete the Airports Commission's Register of Interests.

== Final report ==
The Commission published its final report on 1 July 2015. It unanimously concluded that the proposal for a new northwest runway at Heathrow Airport, combined with a package of measures to address its environmental and community impacts, presented the strongest case and offered the greatest strategic and economic benefits – providing around 40 new destinations from the airport and more than 70,000 new jobs by 2050.
