= Heathrow Airtrack =

Proposed airport express rail service between Waterloo, Surrey and Berkshire

Heathrow Airtrack (proposed)

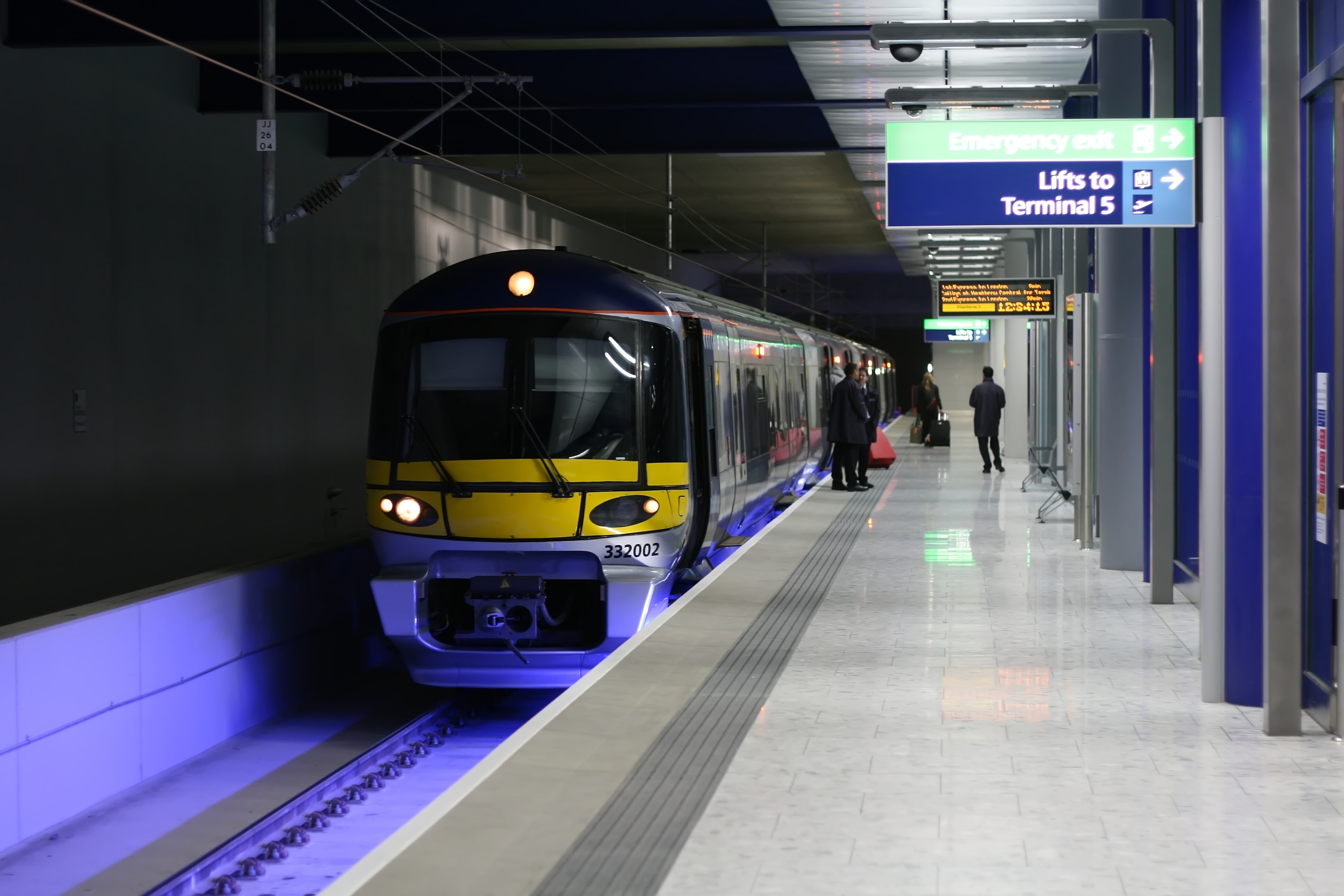
- The current Terminal 5 station which would have formed part of Airtrack

Overview
- Status: Proposal only
- Owner: Heathrow Airport Holdings (railway tracks around Heathrow Airport); Network Rail (remainder of the network)
- Locale: London, England, UK
- Termini: Heathrow Terminal 5; London Waterloo Reading Woking Guildford
- Stations: 13

Service
- Type: Urban rail / Airport rail link proposal
- System: National Rail

Technical
- Track gauge: 1,435 mm (4 ft 8 1/2 in)

Heathrow Airtrack was a proposed railway link in the United Kingdom which would link Heathrow Airport in west London to London Waterloo railway station in Central London.

The line, as proposed by BAA, would run from Heathrow Terminal 5 across the suburbs of southwest London to Waterloo, with additional direct rail services from the airport to Reading and Guildford. Airtrack would provide an alternative route into London to the existing rail routes from Heathrow, Heathrow Express, the Elizabeth line and the Piccadilly line.

The scheme has been estimated to cost £673 million. In April 2011, BAA announced that it would not proceed with the project, citing the unavailability of government subsidy and other priorities for Heathrow.

Various alternate forms have since been proposed, including a revised plan Airtrack-Lite put forward by Wandsworth London Borough Council in 2011.

== Plans ==
Heathrow Terminal 5 has two safeguarded heavy rail platforms for use by a west-facing connection to the National Rail network, which would be utilised by Airtrack. The original proposal for the AirTrack link included a new station, called Staines High Street, to be built near the site of the former station of the same name, but that plan was omitted from the revised proposals in the second public consultation, published on 20 October 2008.

A new depot for rolling stock on the site of the former marshalling yard at Feltham is included in the proposal.

BAA indicated that it wished to extend the Heathrow Express service from Terminal 5 to a new terminal platform at Staines.

== Development of the proposal ==
The principle of a rail connection to Heathrow from the south had been the subject of considerable discussion and study for 50 years. Since 1960, there have been more than 10 studies or proposals that considered how to improve surface access to Heathrow by means of an additional fixed rail link, and in 1984 studies confirmed the viability of the link.

Following a period of public consultation in 1998, BAA submitted plans on 24 July 2009 to the Secretary of State for Transport seeking authorisation under the Transport and Works Act to acquire the necessary land and begin constructing the rail link.

Work had been forecast to begin in 2011, with rail services operating by 2015. On 30 July 2010 the Department of Transport wrote to all parties involved in the public inquiry, informing them that this had been delayed indefinitely. The reason cited was that "the Government has confirmed that its most urgent priority is to tackle the UK's budget deficit and that there will be a spending review in the Autumn. The review may have implications for the proposed funding of the Airtrack Scheme and until the position becomes clearer, we do not consider it appropriate to take matters forward...".

In the event, Airtrack was not mentioned in the spending review and, as a result, in November 2010 BAA announced that the "public inquiry remains deferred".

== Construction ==
The economic case considers Airtrack to be a low-cost option, for only 4 kilometres (2.5 miles) of new line would be required, mostly within Spelthorne. The remaining new infrastructure would consist of station improvements and associated facilities.

The key elements of construction work would be:

- Tunnelling from Heathrow Terminal 5 to Stanwell Moor
- Construction of a new rail line across Stanwell Moor and Staines Moor
- Construction of a new section of track in Staines-upon-Thames town centre
- Remodelling of Staines station

In 2008, the scheme was estimated to cost about £673 million, of which about £150 million was expected to come from an operating surplus and the remainder from a government subsidy.

== Services ==
The passenger services proposed for the Airtrack service are generally to offer a half-hourly service to each destination:

London Waterloo – Heathrow: two trains per hour, stopping at:

- Clapham Junction
- Richmond
- Twickenham
- Feltham
- Staines

An extension of the Heathrow Express service to Staines-upon-Thames would provide an additional 2tph between the airport and Staines-upon-Thames. Journey time from Waterloo to Heathrow Airport would have been approximately 40 minutes.

Guildford – Heathrow (via Egham and Virginia Water): two trains per hour (one per hour at peak times), stopping at:

- Chertsey
- Woking

Journey time from Guildford to Heathrow would be approximately 36 minutes.

Reading – Heathrow (via Egham and Virginia Water) two trains per hour, stopping at:

- Wokingham
- Bracknell

Journey time from Reading to Heathrow would be approximately 45 minutes.

== Support and opposition ==
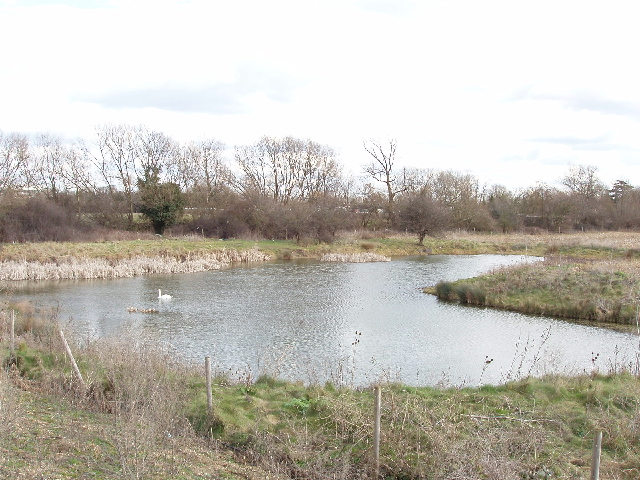
Concerns were raised about planned construction on Stanwell Moor, which has been reduced by successive widenings of the M25

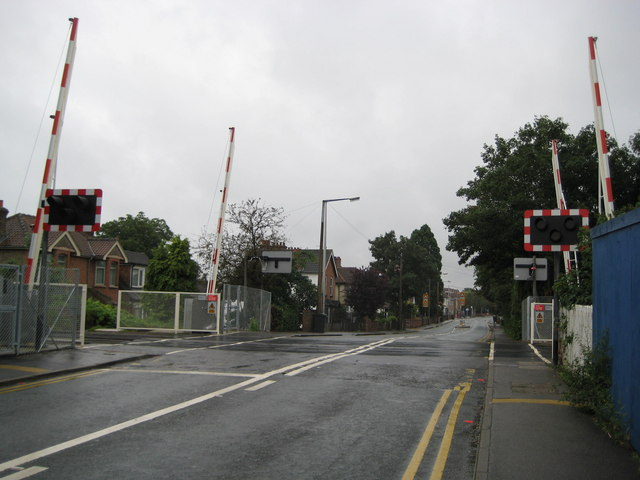
Thorpe Road level crossing, Egham Hythe

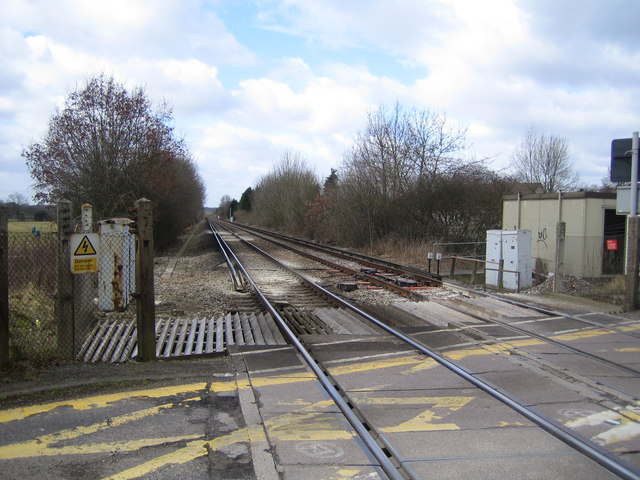
Waterloo Road level crossing, Wokingham

AirTrack Forum, a group of local authorities, businesses and community organisations from Surrey, London and Berkshire, was formed by British Airways in 2000 to support the Airtrack scheme. The group commissioned consultants to study the economic benefits of the scheme funded by the (now defunct) South East England Regional Assembly. A number of local authorities have expressed broad support for Airtrack, among them Runnymede, Reading, Woking, Guildford, Bracknell Forest, Wokingham, Surrey and Hampshire County Councils, along with Transport for London and the Mayor of London.

Some authorities have expressed concerns or objected to certain details of the plans, such as Wokingham. Surrey County Council, although it had previously objected, revised its position after BAA offered to fund £11 million of transport improvements. The move was criticised by the local MP and Secretary of State for Transport Philip Hammond. The Royal Borough of Windsor and Maidenhead expressed "strong concerns" about Airtrack.

=== Environment ===
Most of the construction work would affect Staines Moor and Stanwell Moor, which include a Site of Special Scientific Interest (SSSI), and extensive consultations took place in Spelthorne resulting in major modifications of the scheme. Residents of Feltham expressed opposition to plans for a new train depot close to a natural conservation area. In response to these concerns, BAA published assurances in their consultation literature that the Feltham depot would have been designed to limit noise and light pollution, and with landscape screening.

=== Level crossings ===
A large part of the proposed Airtrack route would run on the Waterloo–Reading line which has fourteen level crossings. Opponents have expressed concerns about the impact of the scheme on these crossings, and local campaigners have that claimed more frequent trains would increase waiting times at closed barriers and cause more road congestion. Level crossings along the route without viable alternatives are chiefly four in Egham and one in Wokingham.

According to an Environmental Statement issued by BAA, Airtrack would have had a slight impact on eight crossings, with barrier closure times increasing by no more than 13%; three crossings would have been moderately affected, with closure time increases of between 13% and 25%; and four crossings would have been "severely" affected, with barrier downtime increasing by between 25% and 36%. Wokingham Borough Council objected to BAA's plans on the grounds that no proper impact assessment had been carried out on level crossing dwell times. BAA investigated the possibility of constructing new road bridges or tunnels to mitigate problems with level crossings.

== Future plans ==
A number of new proposals for expanding transport at Heathrow Airport have been put forward, among which are schemes closely related to Airtrack.

=== Airtrack-Lite ===
In October 2011, Wandsworth London Borough Council announced a revised plan called Airtrack-Lite. To address some of the concerns, this proposes that the Waterloo-to-Windsor service would divide at Staines-upon-Thames, and the service from Weybridge to London (via the Hounslow loop) would be recast as Weybridge-to-Heathrow and Heathrow-to-London services.

In March 2013, Wandsworth Council initiated a study into providing a 30-minute rail journey from Clapham Junction to Heathrow.

=== Aviation Policy Framework proposal ===
A new rail link proposal was included in the government's 2012 High Level Output Specification for rail. The proposed line would use a west-facing connection near Slough, which would allow through trains to serve the airport from South Wales and Bristol if a business case could be established.

=== Windsor Link Railway ===
A variation of Airtrack-Lite is the Windsor Link Railway proposal, calling for a new link to Terminal 5 from a triangle at Wraysbury, for a direct west of England link and a southern London rail link to and from Heathrow. Its envisaged bridge over the M25 is cheaper than the tunnelling associated with most other schemes.

=== Heathrow Southern Railway ===
A rival unrelated proposal, Heathrow Southern Railway, was announced in 2017.

=== Third runway ===
In 2016, the Airtrack-lite plans were re-stated as part of improvements which could be linked to the proposed third runway at Heathrow.

== See also ==
- Crossrail
- Heathwick
- HS4Air
- Superlink (railway network)
- Western Rail Approach to Heathrow
