= Windsor Link Line =

The Windsor Link Line or Windsor Link Railway may refer to:

- Windsor Link Line, Salford, a short railway line in Salford, United Kingdom
- Windsor Link Railway, a proposed railway in Windsor, United Kingdom

== See also ==
- Windsor line (disambiguation)
