= Windsor Royal railway station =

Proposed train stop in Berkshire, England

Windsor Royal was a proposed railway station in Windsor and part of the Windsor Link Railway, which would have seen Windsor & Eton Riverside and Windsor & Eton Central, replaced by one station which would link to Heathrow Terminal 5.

== Plans ==
In June 2013, the company announced that Network Rail had given the green light to go ahead to the next phase of development and seek private investment.

On 11 December 2013, the Royal Borough of Windsor & Maidenhead received 1,423 signatures in support of the project. This resulted in the project being discussed at full council on 25 February 2014. A unanimous motion was passed in support of the project, noting the petition, encouraging WLR to engage in the planning process and looking forward to further submissions.

In August 2014, WLR announced that it had retained Turner & Townsend to run a competition to select an investment partner.

In November 2014, a working group of the local planning authority, the Royal Borough of Windsor & Maidenhead, recommended support of the proposals in the borough local plan, provided no substantial harm to heritage assets was verified. This was confirmed by the borough's cabinet on 26 February 2015.

Also, the local neighbourhood plan included the associated regeneration of the Windsor riverside area in its 'vision day'. The Windsor Observer reported on 31 July 2015 that plans for a public consultation on the Windsor Link Railway had been delayed. This was to allow the rail link to be considered in the wider context of a "Windsor regeneration project".

The WLR plans to link the two stations were rejected in early December 2018 by the Department for Transport.
