= Heathwick =

2011 high-speed rail link proposal

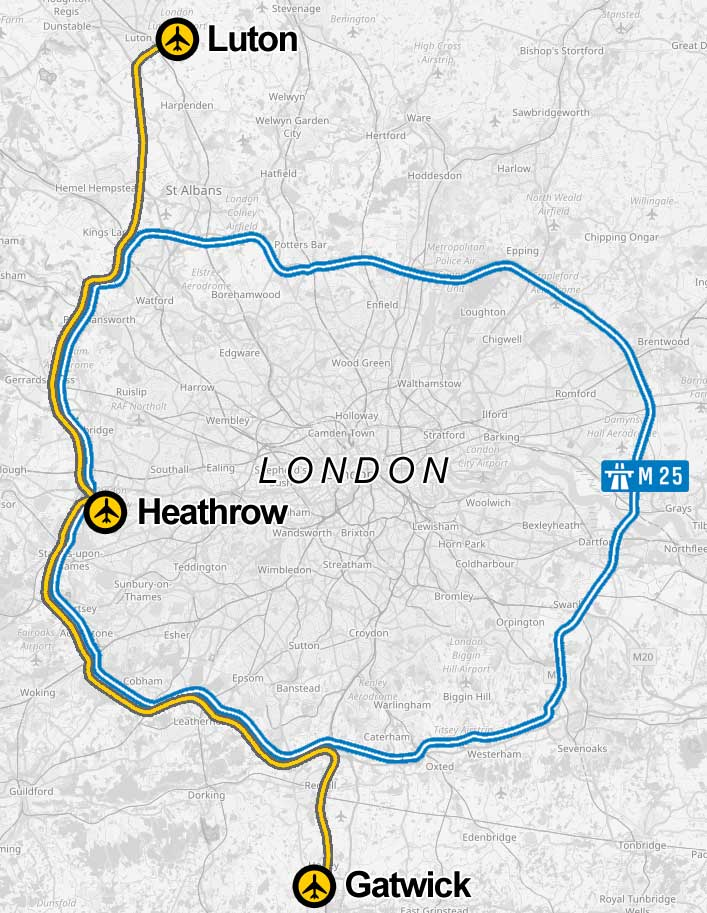
- Map of the approximate rail route

Overview
- Status: Proposed
- Locale: Hertfordshire, West London, West Sussex, Bedfordshire
- Termini: Luton Airport; Gatwick airport
- Website: interlinkingtransitsolutions.co.uk at the Wayback Machine (archived 20 May 2013)

Service
- Type: Commuter rail Airport rail link

Technical
- Character: Orbital high-speed railway

Heathwick is an informal name for a 2011 private proposal to create a high-speed rail link between London's Heathrow and Gatwick airports, in effect to combine them into a single aviation travel hub. Proponents argue this would balance their capacity and so reduce the need to add more runways to Heathrow, or more airports in the south-east of England. In 2018 the similar project HS4Air was proposed.

== History ==
A similar plan was first mooted in the 1990s, then by the British Chambers of Commerce in 2009. Consideration of it by the UK government began in October 2011, when it was dubbed 'Heathwick' by the UK press.

== Proposals ==
The scheme envisages a 35-mile (56 km) high-speed rail route linking the two airports in 15 minutes, with trains travelling at a top speed of 180 miles per hour (290 km/h) parallel to the M25 and passengers passing through immigration or check-in only once. It is hoped that this streamlined immigration/check-in procedure would enable passengers arriving at one airport and departing on a connecting flight from the other to complete the transfer process within 75 minutes, thereby increasing its attractiveness as a viable alternative to changing flights at an overseas hub airport.

To make a combined Heathwick hub work, Gatwick would assume the role of a short- and medium-haul feeder for Heathrow's long-haul flights. The scheme's success rests on the assumption that a high-speed Gatwick–Heathrow rail link would increase the value of the former's takeoff and landing slots to a point where it will be attractive for low/no frills airlines that presently account for more than half of its traffic to sell these to full-service rivals and move their operations to other London airports Stansted, Luton or Southend. This would ensure that Gatwick has sufficient room to accommodate the large number of short-/medium-haul flights needed to feed Heathrow's long-haul services, given that it is already running at 80% capacity. Gatwick would also be required to build a second runway to cope with the huge influx of new short and medium haul flights moving in from Heathrow and to create an effective four runway hub with Heathrow.

Proponents of Heathwick argue that at an estimated cost of £5 billion it is a viable alternative to the politically fraught provision of additional runway capacity at existing airports in the Southeast of England and much cheaper and less time-consuming than building a new hub airport in the Thames Estuary.

In 2013 a group called Interlinking Transit Solutions Ltd submitted proposals to the House of Commons Transport Select Committee which outlined a privately financed rapid transit system named London Air Rail Transit system (LARTs). This orbital light rail system would follow the M25 route on an elevated guideway from Luton Airport in the north, around to Heathrow and terminating at Gatwick. It would include connections to several radial railway lines with interchanges at Iver (Great Western Main Line), Kings Langley (West Coast Main Line), West Byfleet (South West Main Line), Merstham (Thameslink) and Sevenoaks (South Eastern Main Line). Further extensions as far as Stansted Airport are also envisaged. Special light rail rolling stock would be designed to carry baggage, cargo and mail.

== Industry reaction ==
The aviation and rail industry's initial response has been overwhelmingly negative: British Airways said it would not address the South-East's looming airport capacity crunch, which it said must be alleviated to maintain the UK's global competitiveness. EasyJet vowed to fight a forcible move from Gatwick. Ryanair CEO Michael O'Leary doubted the feasibility of the Heathwick high-speed rail link in the foreseeable future due to its high cost. BAA and an unnamed rail executive questioned the project's success on grounds of technical, operational, political and financial difficulties as well as long time scales.

== Present alternatives ==
To travel between London airports the main options are (which can equally work in reverse):

- Elizabeth line trains run from all Heathrow Airport terminal stations into central London. Passengers are able to change at Farringdon onto Thameslink trains to Luton Airport Parkway or Gatwick Airport, and at Liverpool Street for Stansted or Southend Airports.

Heathrow to Gatwick

- Heathrow Express trains go only to Paddington station. From there, passengers can use bus, taxi or London Underground (District or Circle Lines) to transfer to Victoria station. Gatwick Express trains go from Victoria to Gatwick Airport. A two-hour journey is standard.
- For those with less luggage and at less cost, a 285 bus from Heathrow Central Bus Station (for Terminals 2, 3) (or the 490 from Terminal 5 calling next at Terminal 4) serves Feltham railway station; there, passengers normally await the four- or five-stop trains to Clapham Junction; where they change for a train to Gatwick Airport. A time of 1 hours 40 minutes is typical from Terminal 4; or as much as 3 hours from the other terminals during heavy traffic, worse timings and if slow trains are boarded (usually required during the morning peak).

North-south

- An automated people mover, the Luton DART serves Luton Airport from Luton Airport Parkway; from there, Thameslink trains run directly to Gatwick Airport.

All London airports

- Coaches take typically 60 to 90 minutes, including waiting time (up to 15 minutes peak hour and up to 1 hour off-peak)
- Taxis take around 45 minutes (Heathrow-Gatwick) if in little traffic and 80 minutes (north-south), however, more than double that in heavy traffic.

All options require going through immigration, baggage delivery (for those with checked-in baggage), a customs channel, and later to check-in and security check pre-flight, which adds to these times. Passengers should seek to purchase at their first-leg airport an auto-checked, fully issued ticket/e-ticket boarding pass to bypass the first stage of connection flight check-in(s).

== See also ==
- Heathrow Airport transport proposals
- Superlink (railway network)
- Windsor Link Railway
- Airlink (helicopter shuttle service), which linked the airports between 1978 and 1986
