= HS4 =

HS4 may refer to:

- A postcode in the HS postcode area in the Outer Hebrides, Scotland, UK
- HS4Air, a proposed high-speed railway in southern England, UK
- HS-4, a former designation of the HSC-4 helicopter squadron of the United States Navy
