= Superlink =

Superlink may refer to:

- Superlink (railway network)
- Transformer: Superlink, see Transformers: Energon
- M&M Superlink, see Mutants & Masterminds
