= Windsor line =

Windsor line or Windsor lines may refer to a number of railway lines:

- Staines–Windsor line, in England
- Slough–Windsor & Eton line, in England
- Windsor lines of the London and South Western Railway, in England
- Windsor Link Line, Salford, in England
- Quebec City–Windsor Corridor (Via Rail), in Ontario, Canada
- St Kilda – Windsor railway line, in Melbourne, Australia

== See also ==
- Windsor Link Railway, a proposed line in Windsor, England
- Windsor and Hantsport Railway, a defunct line in Nova Scotia, Canada
- Windsor and Annapolis Railway, a defunct line in Nova Scotia, Canada
- House of Windsor, the royal house of the United Kingdom
