= Western Rail Approach to Heathrow =

Proposed rail link in England

Coordinates: 51.486°N 0.520°W

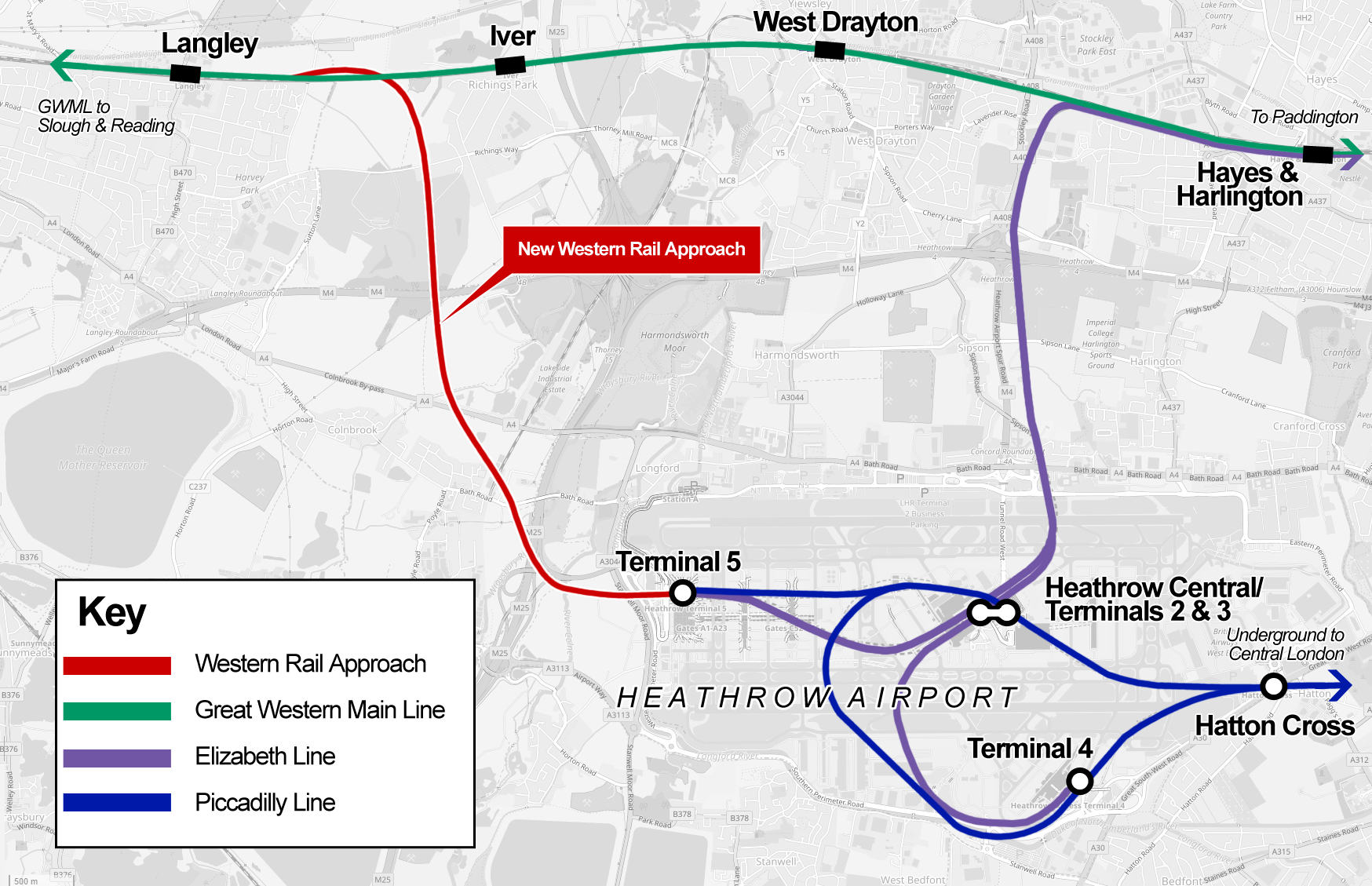
- Map of the proposed rail link

Overview
- Status: Proposed
- Owner: Network Rail
- Locale: Heathrow Airport, West London
- Termini: Langley; Heathrow Terminal 5
- Website: Official website

Service
- Type: Commuter rail Airport rail link
- System: Great Western Main Line/ Elizabeth line/Heathrow Express

Technical
- Character: Railway spur in tunnel

The Western Rail Approach to Heathrow is a proposed bi-directional link westward from London's Heathrow Airport to the Great Western Main Line. It would thus run, in council areas, from Greater London under Iver, South Bucks, Buckinghamshire to Langley, Slough. Beginning at Heathrow Terminal 5 station, it would run via a tunnel to a junction east of Langley station, therefore allowing trains to run to and from destinations in the west: Slough, Reading and beyond. When completed, it would improve rail connections to Heathrow from the Thames Valley as well as from South West England, South Wales and the Midlands. It would also reduce congestion at London Paddington by reducing the number of journeys via that station.

The rail link was first announced in 2012. The £900 million project was brought to a "controlled pause" by Network Rail in January 2021 as a result of the impact of COVID-19 restrictions on the aviation industry, raising concerns that the project may never be put into place.

== Announcements ==
The project was announced by the Department of Transport in July 2012. Theresa Villiers, the rail minister at the time, included it in the High Level Output Statement published in 2012. This stated 'The Government wishes to see a new railway link to give western rail access to Heathrow Airport' but did not commit to the scheme, making it 'subject to a satisfactory business case and the agreement of acceptable terms with the Heathrow aviation industry'.

The Airports Commission has expressed support for the link and included it in its 2014 report on the Expansion of Heathrow Airport.

== Progress ==
Network Rail originally estimated that the project could be operational by 2020. In January 2017, Network Rail's estimate was 2024. Slough Borough Council has cited 'parliamentary activity' as the reason for the delay but not offered further explanation.

In May 2018, it was reported that Network Rail intended to apply for a Development Consent Order (DCO) in 2019, and that construction would be privately financed. Before submitting this, Network Rail presented the final designs for the scheme in a series of public information events, which were held in early 2020.

The Department for Transport's Rail Network Enhancements Pipeline, published in October 2019, listed the project among those in an early stage of development, awaiting a "decision to design" and the completion of an outline business case. In December 2020, Network Rail stated that progress had been paused by the impact of the COVID-19 pandemic on the aviation and rail industries, and that agreement was awaited on a financial contribution from Heathrow Airport Holdings. Therefore, the DCO application would be delayed until at least the winter of 2022.

In January 2025, the government expressed support for a third runway for Heathrow Airport. Following this announcement, in March, 18 Berkshire MPs signed a letter calling for government to support the rail link and noting the benefits of reduced journey times for rail passengers travelling from the west.

== Route ==
The proposed route is a new 5.5-kilometre (3.4-mile) railway line that would leave the Great Western Main Line between Langley and Iver before entering a new twin-bore tunnel. The tunnel would pass under Richings Park and Colnbrook and then join existing lines at Heathrow Terminal 5.

Four access buildings will be built along the route to provide emergency access to the tunnels, with two additionally providing ventilation. Realignment of the existing tracks will be required between Langley and Iver.

The route could potentially mean closure of Mansion / Hollow Hill Lane. The effects of this closure were being investigated by Slough Borough Council.

The Western Rail Approach is, according to the Airport Expansion Consultation, designed to be "independent yet compatible" with the Heathrow expansion.

== Services ==
It is envisaged that there would be a service of four trains an hour from Heathrow to Slough and Reading. Earlier publicity also suggested there would be two trains per hour to Twyford and Maidenhead.

Heathrow Express have offered to run services to Reading which would stop only at Slough.

== Alternative and complementary schemes ==
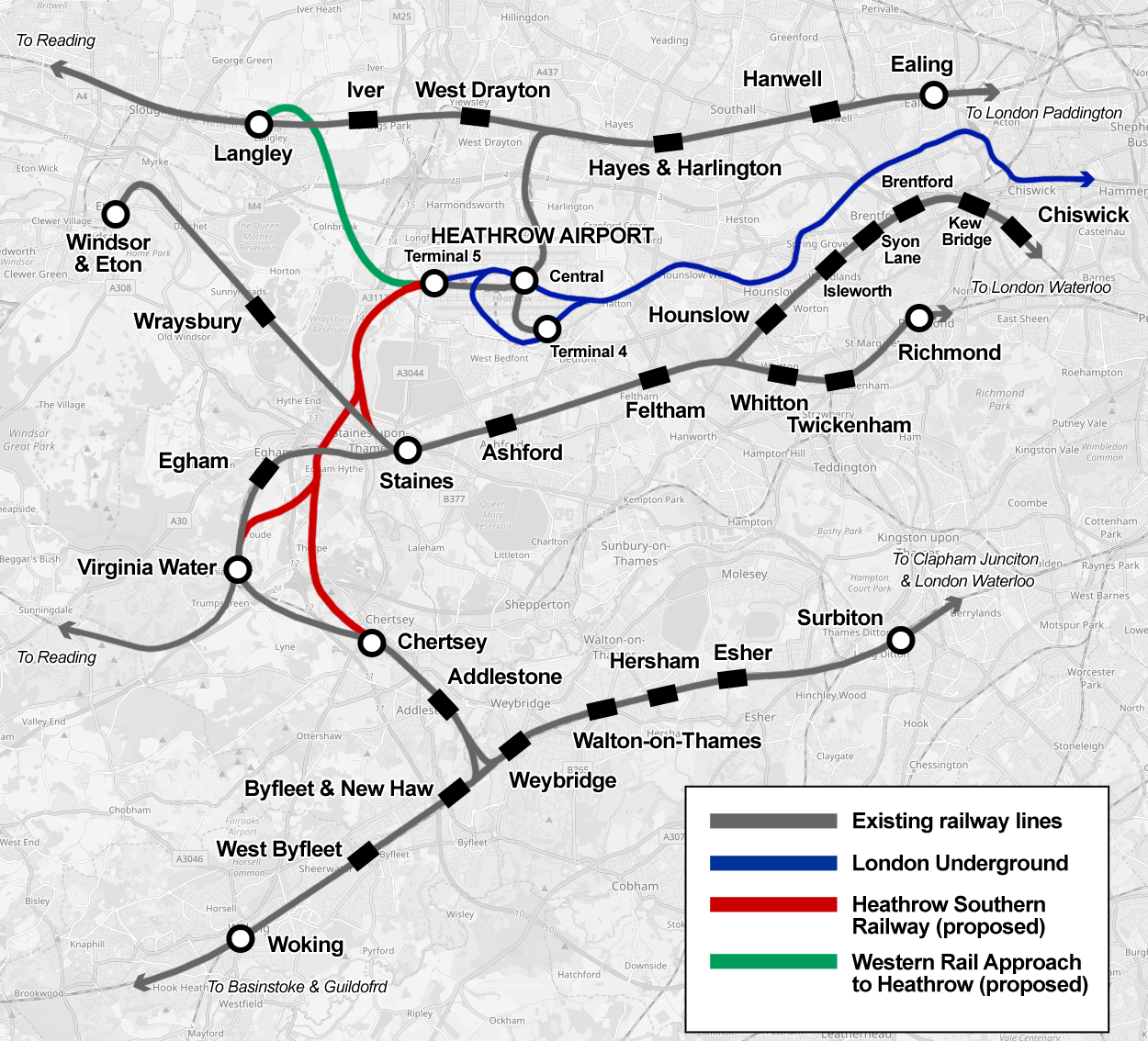
Map of the Western Rail Approach proposal, with the proposed Heathrow Southern Railway also shown.

Other schemes have been proposed to connect Heathrow Airport to the Great Western Main Line. A western link featured in the Heathrow Airtrack scheme, abandoned in 2011.

Another alternative scheme was the Windsor Link Railway, proposed in 2013 and rejected by the government in 2018, which would have provided both western and southern access to Heathrow.

A complementary scheme which could be developed at a later date, or alongside the Western Rail Approach, is the Heathrow Southern Railway, proposed since 2017 to provide links from the airport to the south and south-west.

== See also ==
- Heathrow Airport transport proposals
