= Heathrow Hub railway station =

Proposed station at Heathrow Airport

Heathrow Hub railway station was a proposed interchange that would serve – mainly – a now disbanded potential alignment of High Speed 2 (HS2) services that would adjoin the expanded part of Heathrow Airport, England. It was a cornerstone part of an expansion plan put forward in 2008, by engineering firm Arup, to set up the UK's first high-speed rail network north-west of London.

The plan was dropped. The Government has chosen a rail axis that adopts the line of major tracks through Buckinghamshire rather than along the Great Western Main Line, thus north-west, in line with the general axis of the route to Birmingham and Manchester. It thus makes use of London Euston railway station which is very close to the existing continental connection station, London St Pancras International and requires less tunnelling and complex rail interchanges in London.

== Proposal ==
The location would have been halfway between West Drayton and Iver stations, consecutive stations of the Great Western Main Line.

In the late 1980s Arup co-provided the logistical and engineering solutions for the Michael Heseltine-sponsored new East London alignment of the Channel Tunnel Rail Link. The route proposed by the company focused on using the link as a catalyst for regeneration – it was backed by cross-department officials and Cabinet in 1991. It came into being in November 2007, when the first Eurostar arrived via High Speed 1, at St Pancras railway station.

As to westward expansion, Arup's proposal envisaged a high-speed station at the airport alongside a new air terminal, thus linking both to continental Europe via Eurostar International services. Such station would enjoy interchange with the Great Western Main Line making the airport more accessible to the West, South West Peninsula, Wales and the Midlands and work in concert with Crossrail with its extra London links.

== Evaluations ==
The cost of the Heathrow Hub railway station project (including the costs of tunnelling a high-speed rail line from central London to Heathrow and a rail station with international and regional services) was estimated at £4.5 billion. In 2008, Arup met with the then Secretary of State for Transport, Ruth Kelly to discuss how this might be private-sector-funded.

Given overtures of funding from the airport in February 2009, the shadow government Conservative Rail Review, 'Getting the best for passengers', said that "a Conservative Government would support proposals along the lines of the plan put forward by engineering firm, Arup, for a new Heathrow rail hub."

The costing estimates were cast into some doubt by many parties involved and local residents and a wider alignment debate followed. A largely independent company followed to work out best value and recommend among the main options – the government's 2009 set up of High Speed Two (HS2) Limited. This organisation has ever since been charged with considering the options to extend the UK's high-speed rail network from London to Birmingham and beyond.

In 2010 the incoming Coalition Government generally favoured a high-speed route via Heathrow Hub railway station, rather than an interchange at Old Oak Common railway station. In July 2010 a minor variant emerged for a 12-platform station at Iver: for High Speed 1, 2, Crossrail and the Great Western Main Line trains. Given extensive, costly tunnelling it would be: 3 1/2 minutes from Heathrow Terminal 5; and 12 from London Euston. It met with general opprobrium in the south Buckinghamshire residents associations and press.

Since March 2015 the Secretary of State for Transport has ruled out a Heathrow Hub proposal in the HS2 programme until any possible long-term phase (Phase 3 or beyond). In the years since an alignment has proceeded, with land purchases, along a shorter, more tunnelled line which takes it through the centre of Buckinghamshire.

== See also ==
- Heathrow Airport transport proposals
