= Turner & Townsend =

English construction company

Turner & Townsend Partners LLP
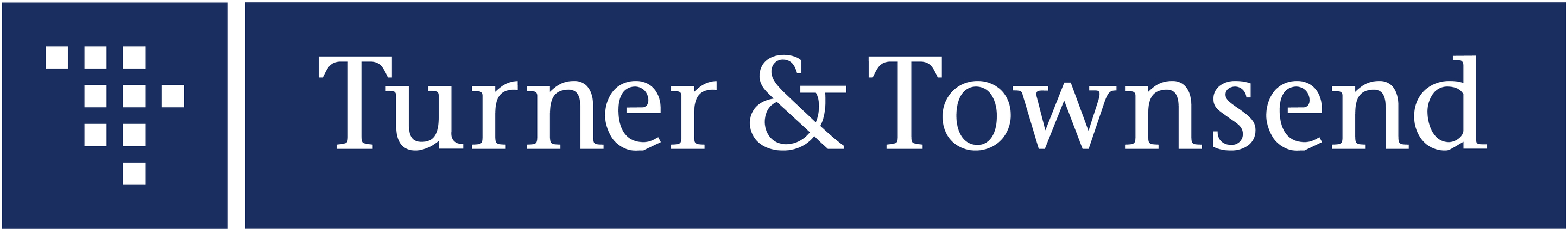
- Type: Partnership
- Industry: Construction
- Founded: 1946
- Founder: Cornelius Turner, Francis Ing, and Geoff Townsend
- Headquarters: London, United Kingdom
- Number of locations: 125 offices, 48 countries
- Key people: Vincent Clancy (CEO); David Whysall (COO); Richard Peers (CFO); Colm Coffey (CPO)
- Services: Programme management; Project management; Project cost management; Consulting
- Owners: CBRE Group (70%)
- Number of employees: 20,000+ (2025)
- Website: www.turnerandtownsend.com

Turner & Townsend (officially Turner & Townsend Partners LLP) is a multinational professional services company headquartered in Leeds, United Kingdom specialising in programme management, project management, cost management and consulting across the property, infrastructure and natural resources sectors. It is one of the world’s largest construction consultancies.

The company was founded in 1946, and in 2018 operated 125 offices in 48 countries, with a presence in Europe, Middle East & North Africa, the Americas, Asia Pacific and Africa. It is 70% owned by US-based CBRE Group.

== History ==
The company was founded in 1946 as Turner & Ing, a quantity surveying partnership based in Darlington, United Kingdom. During 1956, the company was rebranded as Turner & Townsend and opened several additional offices across the UK. During 1982, the company opened its first international office in Johannesburg. In 1996, the firm was restructured into Turner & Townsend Group; the subsidiary Turner & Townsend Management Solutions was also created around this time. Throughout the 1990s, it set up operations in Asia as well as opened a further five offices across Africa.

During the 2000s, the company expanded into the Americas and Australia; expansion within the UK also continued, often involving the recruitment of whole teams from rival companies. During 2009, the company underwent senior management changes as well as restructuring; within two years, almost 50 per cent of the company's undertakings were originating from outside the British market, a trend that company's management anticipated to continue over time. In late 2011, Turner & Townsend launched the takeover of the US project management company Ferzan Robbins & Associates as part of its overseas expansion. Two years later, it also acquired of the Norwegian contract management and strategic procurement consultants Pearson Lugard A/S. By 2018, Turner & Townsend operated from 125 offices across 48 countries.

In July 2021, the US commercial real estate group CBRE purchased a 60 percent stake in Turner & Townsend in exchange for £960 million. The acquisition has led to the company expanding its international network. In June 2024, CBRE announced plans to merge its project management businesses into Turner & Townsend, creating a $3 billion business employing over 2,000 staff in 60 countries. CBRE will also increase its T&T ownership stake to 70 percent; Vincent Clancy, Turner & Townsend's chairman and CEO (who joined the company in 1989, and had been on the Executive Board since 2002), would join the CBRE main board. The merger of CBRE's project management arm with Turner & Townsend was completed in January 2025.

== Notable projects ==
Turner & Townsend is best known for its provision of project management and programme management consultancy work in the real estate, infrastructure and natural resources sectors.

Various businesses and organisations have turned to the firm over the years. During 1993, Warner Brothers turned to Turner & Townsend for cost management services to its then mid-construction UK retail stores. It has also provided services to the British government on multiple occasions; during the mid 1990s, it undertook project management and quantity surveying work for a Ministry of Defence accommodation scheme on Cyprus, cost management and surveying work for the new headquarters of the Department of Energy, as well as cost management of the Trident nuclear deterrence programme.

By the late 1990s, the company was generating considerable revenue from the British government's private finance initiative (PFI) schemes, which facilitated various activities traditionally performed by the public sector to be competitively contracted out to private companies. Similar such arrangements continued into the early 21st century.

In January 2008, Turner & Townsend's rail division was awarded work on Network Rail's new rail services framework, valued at £30 billion. That same year, it was selected to project manage the construction of The Shard, the tallest building in London at the time of its completion. In July 2011, they were contracted to provide cost planning services for Sydney's North West Rail Link. During 2014, Heathrow Airport appointed them to provide cost management and commercial services for its latest five-year spending programme. That same year, it was awarded a contract to provide cost estimating, project support and consultancy services for the Eni floating liquefied natural gas project in Mozambique. During the early 2020s, the company has taken a leading role in the British government's refurbishment scheme for social housing.

=== Partial list of additional key projects ===
- Hong Kong International Airport’s third runway project
- Carmichael coal mine, port and rail programme
- Abu Dhabi Airport – Midfield Terminal Building
- Nissan Retail Environment Design Initiative
- Quellaveco and Michiquillay copper mines – Peru
- Lenovo research and development centre, Wuhan, China
- 10 Downing Street refurbishment, London, England
- Windsor Link Railway, Hampshire, England
- Lower Thames Crossing, London, England

== Awards and recognition ==
- Engineering, Construction and Infrastructure project of the year – Association for Project Management 2017
- CEO of the year – Building Awards 2017
- CEO of the year – Building Awards 2014
- Consultant of the year – Building Awards 2014 & 2013
- The Queens Award – Enterprise in International Trade 2014
- Sunday Times International Track 200 – top UK-based companies with the fastest growing international sales 2014
- Number 1 in the Sunday Times PwC Top Track 250 – 2020
