= Heathrow Southern Railway =

Proposed train service in Berkshire, Surrey and Greater London

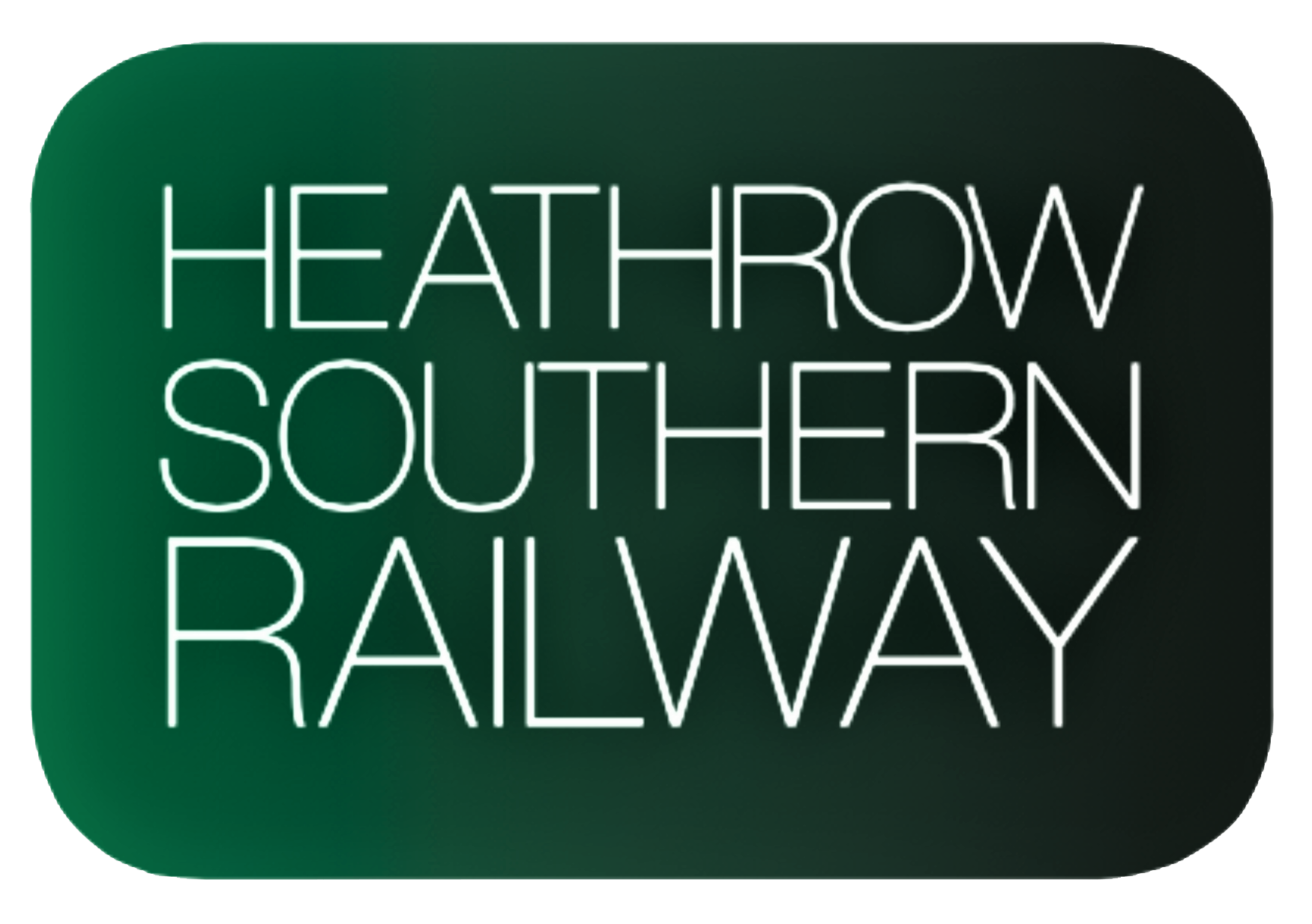

Overview
- Status: Proposed
- Owner: Heathrow Southern Railway Limited
- Locale: London, England, UK
- Termini: Heathrow Terminal 5; London Waterloo Basingstoke Southampton Central Guildford Portsmouth Harbour

Service
- Type: Urban rail / Airport rail link proposal
- System: National Rail

History
- Planned opening: Early 2030s

Technical
- Track gauge: 1,435 mm (4 ft 8 1/2 in)
Route map
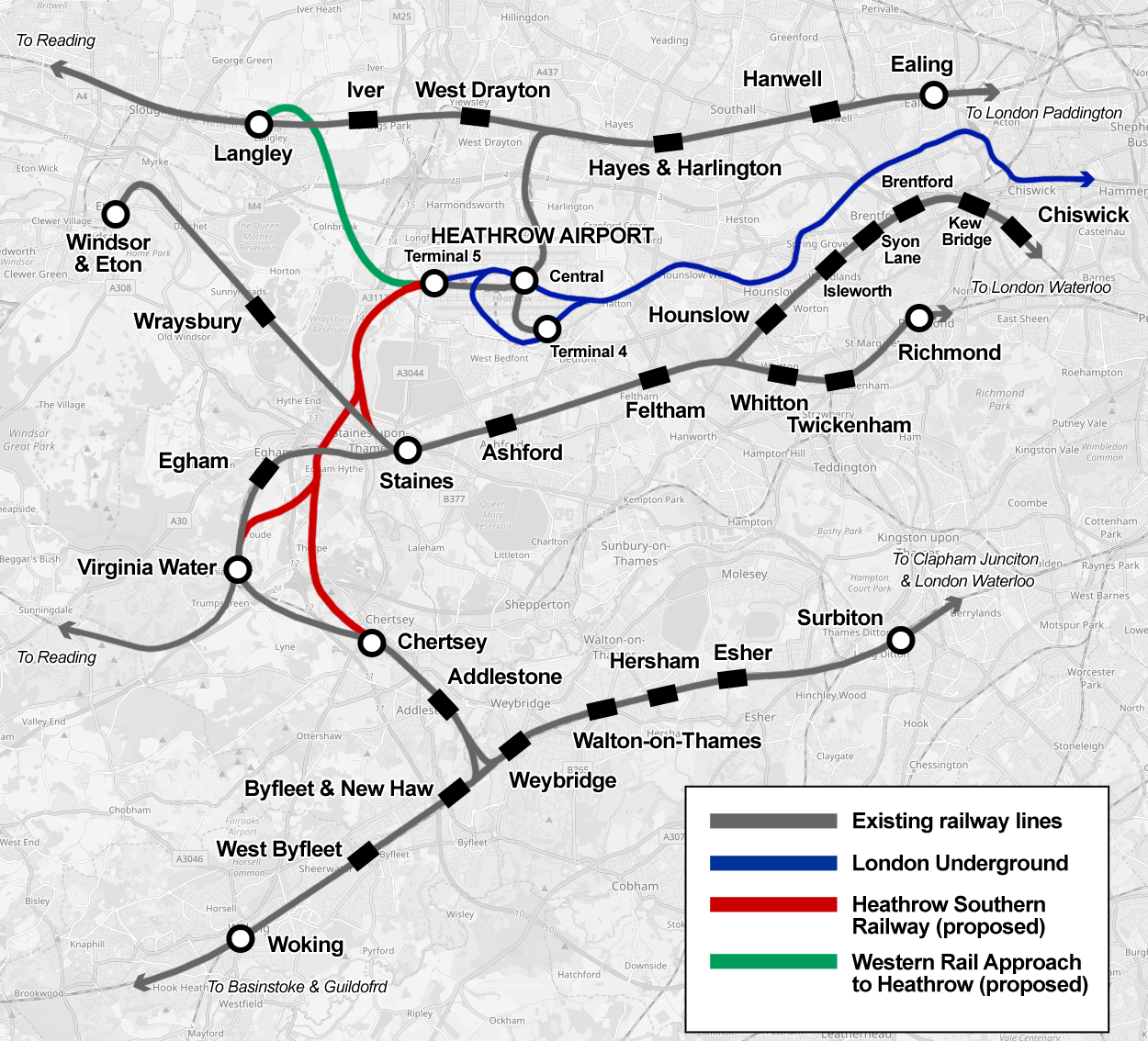
Map of the proposals, with the Elizabeth line and proposed Western Rail Approach to Heathrow also shown

The Heathrow Southern Railway is a proposed new railway in the United Kingdom which would link Heathrow Airport to railway lines south of London. The scheme, announced in August 2017, is promoted by Heathrow Southern Railway Limited and would be financed privately. In a government paper published in November 2019, the project has been officially called SAtH - Southern Access to Heathrow. The reason given is that it is not only heavy rail access that is being considered but other transport options too.

If built, the new rail infrastructure, up to 8 miles (13 km) in length, would link Heathrow Terminal 5 with Chertsey or Virginia Water and Staines, and would enable direct trains to run from Basingstoke, Woking, Guildford to Heathrow Airport stations. It would also create a new link to the airport from London Waterloo via Clapham Junction, Twickenham, Richmond, Hounslow and Staines. The proposals are similar to an earlier scheme, Heathrow Airtrack.

Heathrow Southern Railway was originally to have opened between 2025 and 2027, with an estimated capital cost of between £1.3 and £1.6 billion. However, HSR Ltd said that it would be at least the 2030s before the railway could open. The scheme has been put forward in response to the Department for Transport's invitation for proposals from private investors for a southern rail link to Heathrow.

== Heathrow Southern Railway Limited ==
Heathrow Southern Railway Limited is a private limited company registered in London. It was founded on 16 June 2016 with the aim of bidding for improved rail access to Heathrow Airport. The company states that its proposals would improve public transport capacity and help to reduce traffic congestion and pollution.

The company's founding member was transport planner Steven Costello, and the company board is chaired by Baroness Jo Valentine.

== Proposed route ==
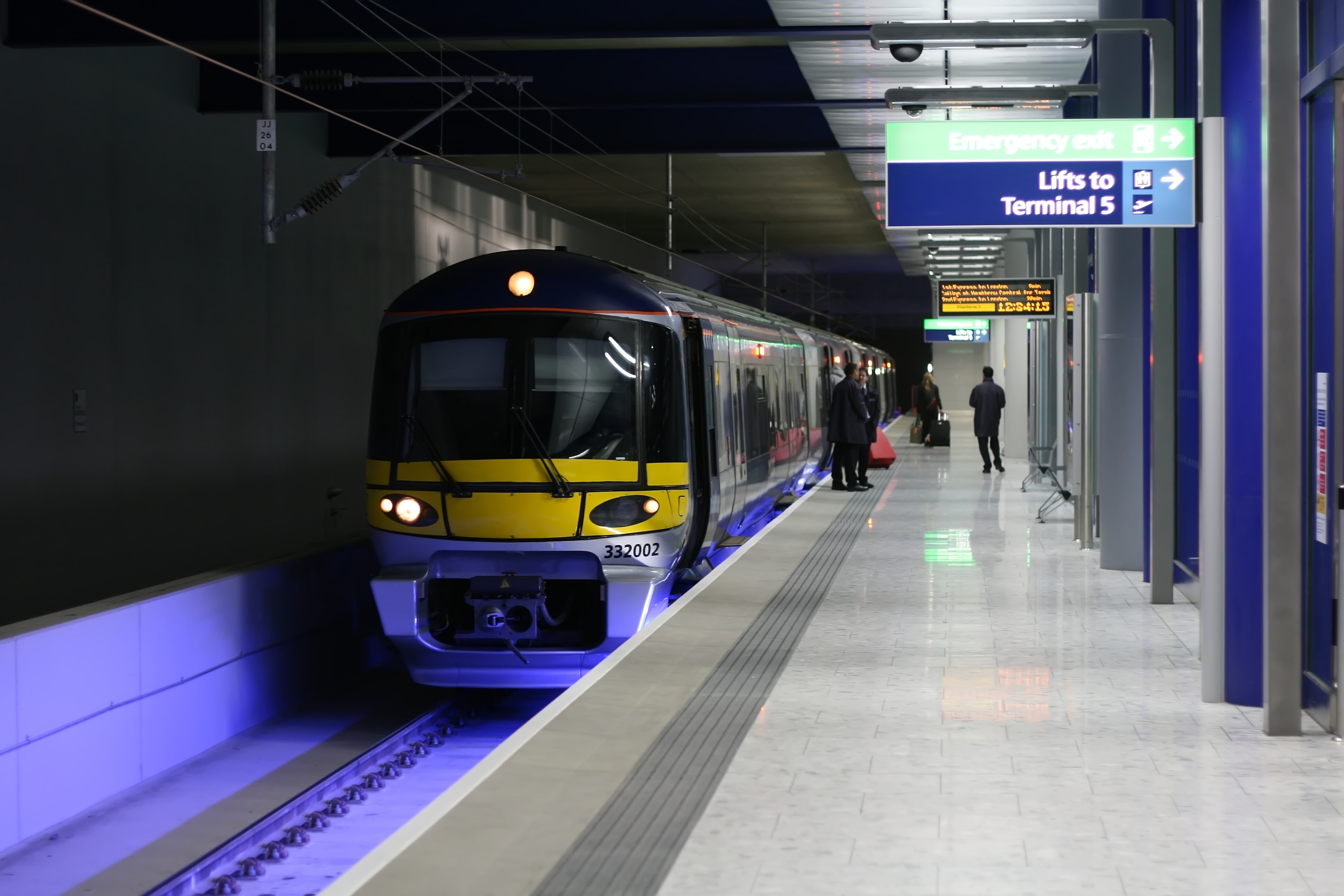
The proposed route would extend the line west from Heathrow T5 station, with connections to Reading, Woking and Central London

The proposed route starts in a short section of tunnel from the west end of Terminal 5 station, then rises briefly to the surface to make a connection with the Windsor-Staines Line, with the main route continuing in tunnel following the M25 corridor to connect to existing railway near Chertsey or Virginia Water.

Services from Heathrow towards Woking would use the existing Byfleet Junction, enabling trains to join the South Western Main Line "slow lines" between there and Woking. The junction at Byfleet already has a dive-under, avoiding any delays to trains on the intensively used "fast lines".

Overall, construction of the new infrastructure can be carried out with minimal impact on existing railway operations. The only impacts would be the new junctions on the Staines–Windsor and Egham–Weybridge routes, both of which are lightly used lines compared to the South Western Main Line.

Network Rail estimates that there needs to be an additional 60% capacity to serve the expanding Heathrow Airport by 2043 and identified that there is a strong case for implementing a new southern route to meet these needs.

The proposed Heathrow Southern Railway infrastructure also allows for trains from Basingstoke, Woking and Guildford to continue beyond Heathrow Airport to serve a proposed new station at Old Oak Common where there will from 2026 be an interchange with High Speed 2, and also London Paddington which is now on the Elizabeth line. This will also increase accessibility into London from the south and south-west, mainly increasing access to Waterloo and Clapham Junction, while also allowing for new routes such as the Basingstoke to Paddington route and a possible route into Southampton in the future. Using Network Rail's modelling system it has been determined that this new line will be able to carry four trains per hour. Heathrow Southern Railway also recognises that if an extra platform were constructed at Staines station their proposed new infrastructure creates an opportunity for an extension of the Elizabeth line from Heathrow to Staines, which would create another route from Staines into London.

In 2025, Spelthorne Borough Council ruled out the alternative Southern Light Rail proposal and said it would support Heathrow Southern Railway, provided that trains were guaranteed to stop at Staines.

== Funding ==
Heathrow Southern Railway intends that the planned route will be financed privately, with ownership remaining in the private sector during and after the development process. Heathrow Southern Railway claims that the scheme in operation does not need financial support from the tax payer. While being owned by Heathrow Southern Railway the infrastructure is subject to regulation by the Office of Rail and Road (ORR), and the operation and maintenance of the route could be contracted out to other corporations.

== See also ==
- Heathrow Airport transport proposals
- Expansion of Heathrow Airport
- Heathrow Express, the current rail link to the airport, connecting it with London Paddington station
- Western Rail Approach to Heathrow
