= Airlink (helicopter shuttle service) =

UK Gatwick to Heathrow service, 1978–1986

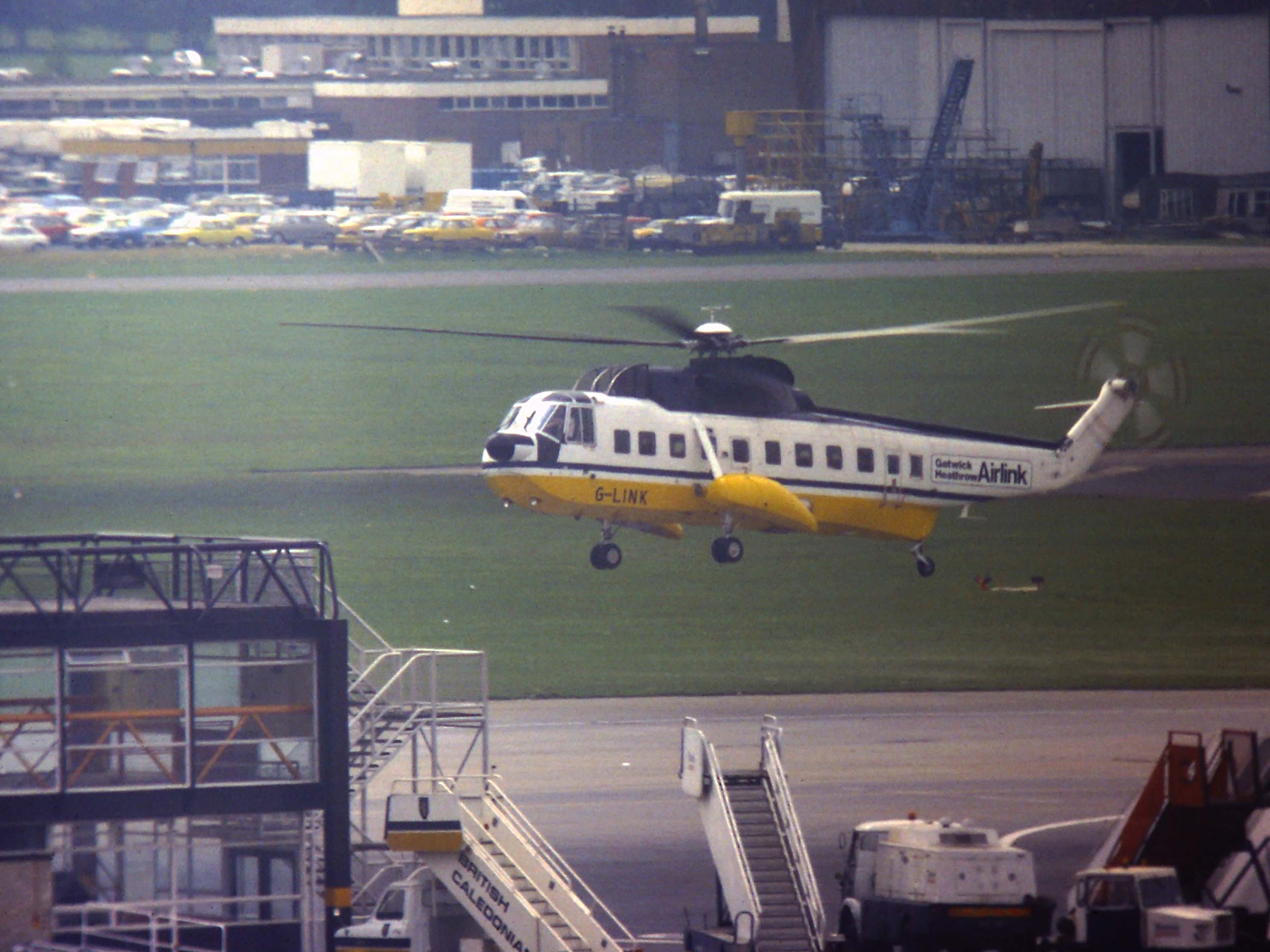
- Airlink Sikorsky S-61N at Gatwick
- Founded: 1978
- Commenced operations: 9 June 1978
- Ceased operations: 6 February 1986
- Fleet size: One Sikorsky S-61
- Destinations: Gatwick Airport; London Heathrow Airport
- Parent company: British Caledonian Airways and British Airways Helicopters

Airlink was the brand name of a helicopter shuttle service which ran between London's two main airports, Gatwick and Heathrow, between 1978 and 1986. Operated jointly by British Caledonian Airways and British Airways Helicopters using a Sikorsky S-61 owned by the British Airports Authority, the "curious and unique operation" connected the rapidly growing airports in the years before the M25 motorway existed. Although at one point the service was granted a licence to operate until 1994, the Secretary of State for Transport intervened and revoked the licence with effect from February 1986—by which time the continued existence of the link had become "a highly controversial issue" debated by Members of Parliament, airlines, airport operators, local authorities and many other interest groups. No similar service has operated between the airports since Airlink's cessation.

== Background ==
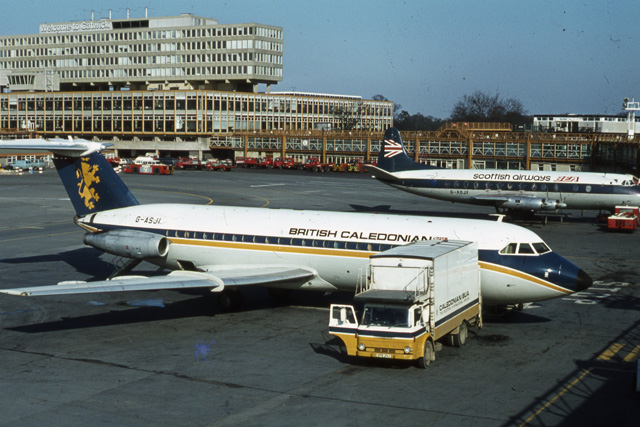
Gatwick Airport pictured in 1972

Heathrow Airport is 12 nmi (22 km; 14 mi) west of central London, and Gatwick Airport is 24.7 nmi (45.7 km; 28.4 mi) south of the city. Transport connections between London and the respective airports are good, but the difficulty of travelling directly between Heathrow and Gatwick was noted as soon as the latter was designated London's second main airport.

The first attempt to run an air shuttle service between the two airports started on 25 June 1969, when Westward Airways (Note: This company became defunct in October 1970, and is not connected to the present Westward Airways company.) started operating flights between Heathrow and the General Aviation Terminal at Gatwick using a Britten-Norman Islander aircraft. This was not well marketed, and the route was unprofitable—not helped by the need for Westward to lease another Islander aircraft after one of the fleet was damaged in an accident in February 1970. Between July 1970 and 22 August 1970, when the route ran for the last time, a Piper PA-28 Cherokee had to be borrowed from another company.

Throughout the 1970s, "many and complex pressures" both encouraged and opposed the reintroduction of an air shuttle service. Large airlines such as British Caledonian and Dan-Air were based at Gatwick and wanted better links with Heathrow for the benefit of their passengers and staff. Meanwhile, the government wanted to reduce the pressure on Heathrow by moving some foreign airlines' flights to Gatwick—a difficult proposal at a time when national airlines were a symbol of prestige—and improving links between the airports would help minimise the negative effect of moving from Heathrow. National transport policy suggested that a motorway would be built between Gatwick and Heathrow at some time in the future, so an air shuttle was considered to be a possible temporary solution. Noise pollution, was expected to be a problem, though, as the natural flightpath between the airports lay above densely populated residential areas. The low altitude of the flights was also expected to invade the privacy of "rich and influential residents" under the flightpath.

== Introduction ==
British Caledonian, British Airways Helicopters and the British Airports Authority (the operator of both airports) began discussing a new service in mid-1977. Their rationale was that a quick, high-frequency shuttle would "effectively link the two airports' flight networks" and allow Gatwick and Heathrow "to operate in tandem". In 1978, they formed a joint venture company called London Airways to operate a new shuttle service using a Sikorsky S-61N helicopter. This was owned by BAA, who "saw [the link] as another sweetener for airlines banished to [Gatwick]". (Moving to Gatwick was generally unpopular with Heathrow-based airlines because it was less convenient for passengers making connections.) British Airways Helicopters (a subsidiary of British Caledonian's larger rival British Airways) could not provide one because all of its aircraft were already in use on services to North Sea oil rigs and the Isles of Scilly. British Caledonian itself was responsible for marketing, ground crew and the single member of cabin crew. Initially, British Airways Helicopters provided the pilots and engineering services; but they later withdrew from the joint venture and were replaced by British Caledonian Helicopters, who provided the same things. The helicopter could accommodate up to 28 passengers, and the company set a target of 64,000 passengers per year. It claimed a potential annual benefit of £10 million to the British economy, on the assumption that each interlining passenger would be transferring to another British carrier and would be generating £150 profit. These arguments—along with claims that international interlining traffic would be won from rival European airports such as Paris Charles de Gaulle and Amsterdam Schiphol; that the British government's transport and economic policies treated Gatwick and Heathrow as a single entity; and the flight planners' demonstration that the route chosen for Airlink would have "the least possible impact" on residential areas below the flightpath—helped to persuade the Civil Aviation Authority to allow the service to start.

A report in February 1978 described Airlink as "long-awaited" and stated it was expected to start in mid-summer. Pending the completion of the southern section of the M25 motorway, and after a public hearing, the joint venture company was given a temporary one-year licence to run the service. (Note: Sir Adam Thomson's autobiography states that the first licence was granted for 18 months.) The inaugural flight was on 9 June 1978. Prince Charles attended the launch ceremony: after travelling from London Victoria on the Rapid City Link express rail service (now branded Gatwick Express), he toured the terminal building and travelled with British Caledonian chairman Sir Adam Thomson on the first flight. One newly built helicopter was sufficient to run the service, which operated ten return trips each day. It took 15 minutes to fly from one airport to the other (a straight-line distance of about 30 miles (48 km)), and passengers were charged £12.00 each way. One of the conditions of the Civil Aviation Authority licence was that flights should not operate between 9.15pm and 6.30am. Unlike its Westward Airways predecessor, Airlink had its own departure and arrival gates and boarding ramps at both airports.

== End ==
During the 1978/79 financial year, when British Caledonian made a pre-tax profit of £12.2 million, 50,000 people used Airlink, and passenger numbers later rose to 60,000 per year. Ten flights were operated in each direction per day. The "quick and rather exciting" service was popular with users, and the licence was renewed for four years in 1979. The next application, made in 1983, sought to extend the licence for ten years. The Civil Aviation Authority granted this in February 1984, but the Secretary of State for Transport Nicholas Ridley overturned this four months later: the link would now cease four months after the M25 opened between Junctions 8 and 10. (Note: The section between the A217 at Reigate and the A3 at Wisley.) This condition was varied again in November 1985: the helicopter link had to stop by 7 February 1986 if its licence had not already run out as a result of the Secretary of State for Transport's amendment. The motorway was in fact completed by October 1985, and Airlink operated for the last time on 6 February 1986, after which its licence was revoked. "Intense and relentless" campaigning against noise pollution and low flying continued throughout Airlink's existence, coordinated by groups such as the Gatwick Conservation Area Campaign and the Federation of Heathrow Anti-Noise Groups. Their argument was that coaches should have been used to connect the airports, whereas BAA claimed "their important passengers were accustomed to helicopters and would not take kindly to a mere bus."

After the service ceased, it was stated that Airlink had carried 600,000 passengers in its eight years of operation, earning £10.5m of direct revenue from fares and generating indirect revenue of £100m. It also supported 62 jobs. Sir Adam Thomson, the chairman of British Caledonian, claimed that Ridley's decision not to renew the licence cost the company £4 million at a time when it was suffering financial problems. In a parliamentary debate in May 1986, Nicholas Soames, then the Member of Parliament for Crawley (which covered Gatwick Airport), claimed that "nearly half the existing passengers [would] in future avoid London", and that their choice of alternative carriers or transport methods would cost the airline industry several million pounds. Michael Spicer, the Parliamentary Under-Secretary of State for Transport, noted that while many people had "argued strongly for the retention" of Airlink, many others within and outside Parliament had "argued no less passionately ... that the helicopter link should cease". He further stated that Airlink had become "a highly controversial issue" and that any outcome would anger some people.

The Sikorsky S-61N helicopter (registration code G-LINK) built for the service and registered on 9 March 1978 had its registration cancelled from 10 June 1987. Research in 2006 found that it had been scrapped and was "languishing in weeds somewhere in Brazil".

Regular coach services have operated between the airports via the M25 since Airlink ceased, but no direct heavy rail, light rail or other transport link has been created. The motorway suffers from frequent and unpredictable congestion. Train connections between the airports typically require an interchange at Farringdon station.

== See also ==
- Heathwick
