= HS4Air =

2018 proposal for a high-speed rail link between HS2, Heathrow, Gatwick and HS1

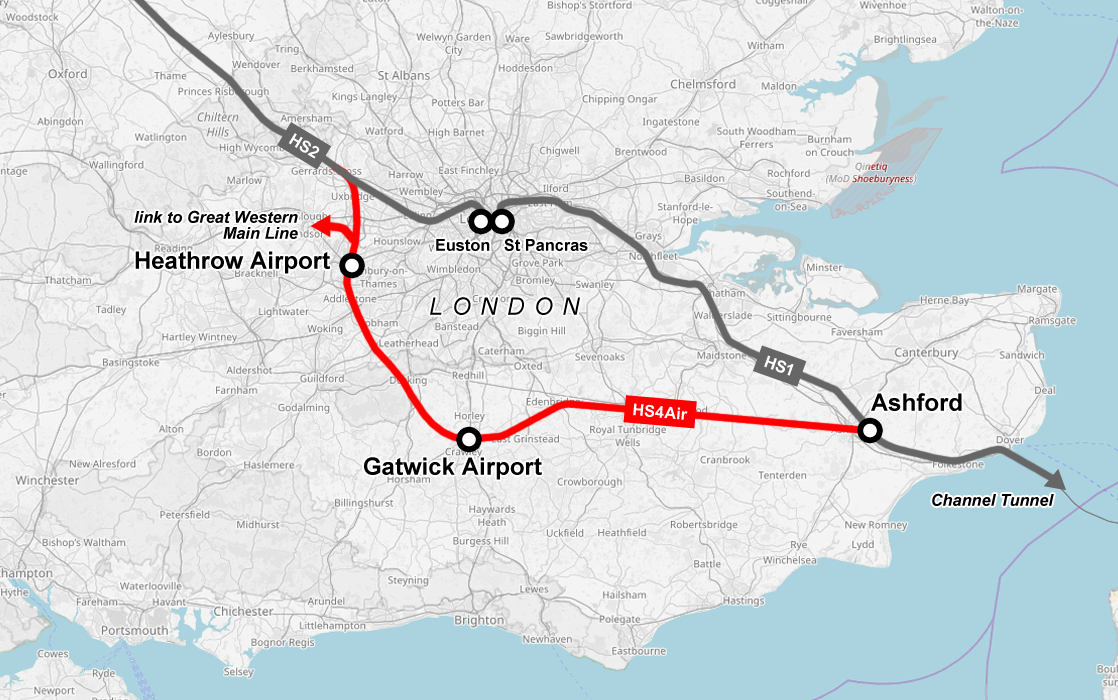
- Map of the proposed HS4Air line in Southern England

Overview
- Status: Rejected by the government
- Owner: Network Rail
- Locale: South East England
- Termini: Denham; Ashford International
- Stations: 4
- Website: expedition.uk.com

Service
- Type: High-speed rail
- System: National Rail

Technical
- Line length: 87 miles (140 km)
- Number of tracks: Double track
- Track gauge: 4 ft 8 1/2 in (1,435 mm) standard gauge
- Loading gauge: UIC GC
- Electrification: 25 kV AC overhead

HS4Air was a proposal for a 140-kilometre (87 mi) high-speed railway line in the United Kingdom, put forward in 2018 by a British engineering consultancy, Expedition Engineering.

The proposed line would have connected the planned High Speed 2 line to the High Speed 1 line via a high-speed route running south of London, and would have formed a direct rail link between Heathrow and Gatwick airports. The proposal was rejected by the government in December 2018 and will not go ahead.

== Background ==
The first high-speed railway line to be built in the United Kingdom was High Speed 1 (HS1), the route connecting London to the Channel Tunnel, which opened 2003−2007. A second route (HS2), between London and Birmingham, is expected to be completed sometime between 2036 and 2039.

A proposal to build a direct connection between HS1 and HS2 in central London was dropped from HS2 construction plans in 2014 due to cost and the impact on the London district of Camden. The HS2 plans also included a connection to Heathrow Airport at Heathrow Hub railway station, but that link was dropped in 2015.

A number of other schemes have been considered to create a rail link between Heathrow and Gatwick airports, collectively dubbed "Heathwick".

== Planned route ==
The proposed line would leave the HS2 line at a junction near Denham in Buckinghamshire, and then run on a route curving south-west of London, partly parallel to the M25 motorway, with stations at Heathrow Airport and Gatwick Airport. It would then head eastwards across Kent using the existing upgraded South Eastern Main Line via Tonbridge to join HS1 at a junction at Ashford International. The link between HS1 and HS2 would allow high-speed trains to travel directly between regional cities in Great Britain and destinations in Continental Europe.

A fifth of the line was planned to be in tunnel in order to mitigate the environmental impact on sensitive rural areas such as the North Downs. It was also proposed to construct a link with the Great Western Main Line. It would cost £10 billion to build and around 40% of the route would reuse existing tracks; the proposals included upgrades at Ashford International and Tonbridge stations.

The scheme envisaged a 15-minute transfer time between Heathrow and Gatwick, allowing the two airports to operate jointly as an airline hub. Fast connections between the airports and Birmingham, Manchester and Cardiff were also proposed, and the proponents of the scheme claimed that it would alleviate pressure on transport within London by reducing the need for air passengers to travel through the city.

The scheme was also linked to proposals to re-open Manston Airport in Kent, which could be connected to the line via Canterbury West.

== Government response ==
Expedition Engineering's proposals were submitted to the Department for Transport (DfT) at the end of July 2018, as part of the Government's plans to encourage private investment. The HS4Air scheme was rejected by Government in December 2018 because the DfT did not consider that Expedition Engineering's proposals were "financially credible without government support", and anticipated public opposition to building the route across green belt land.

== See also ==
- Heathrow Airport transport proposals
- Regional Eurostar
