= Heathrow Terminal 5 station =

National Rail and London Underground station serving London Heathrow Airport

Heathrow Terminal 5
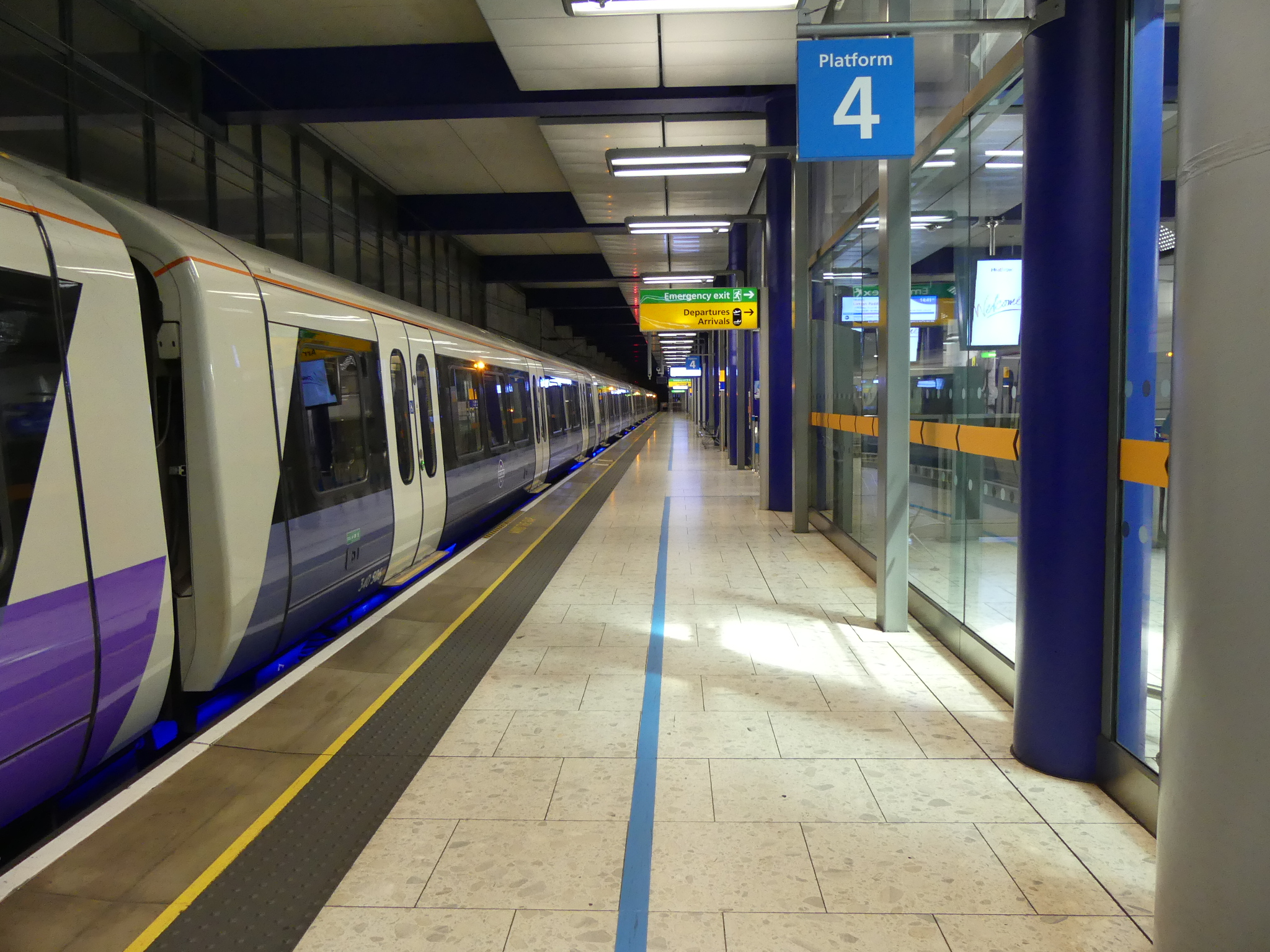
- Heathrow Terminal 5 station platform
- Interactive map of Heathrow Terminal 5

General information
- Location: Heathrow Terminal 5
- Local authority: London Borough of Hillingdon
- Managed by: Heathrow Express
- Owner: Heathrow Airport Holdings
- Station code: HWV
- Number of platforms: 4 (6 total)
- Accessible: Yes
- Fare zone: 6 (excluding Heathrow Express services)

National Rail annual entry and exit
- 2020–21: ▼0.382 million
- 2021–22: ▲1.080 million
- 2022–23: ▲2.620 million
- 2023–24: ▲4.106 million
- 2024–25: ▲4.705 million

Railway companies
- Original company: Heathrow Airport Holdings

Key dates
- 27 March 2008: Station opened

Other information
- External links: Departures; Facilities
- Coordinates: 51.4723°N 0.488°W

Heathrow Terminal 5 is a shared railway and London Underground station at Heathrow Airport serving Heathrow Terminal 5. It serves as a terminus for Heathrow Express services from Paddington, and for Elizabeth line and Piccadilly line (London Underground) services from central London. It is managed and staffed by Heathrow Express.

The London Underground section of the station is situated in London fare zone 6; it is the westernmost below-ground station on the network. It is also the westernmost National Rail station in London.

== History ==
Following the longest public inquiry ever undertaken in the UK, construction of the station was granted in November 2001 by transport minister Stephen Byers as part of the approval of the Heathrow Terminal 5 project. The proposed terminal site was not welcomed by London Underground, as it would be impossible for all three stations to be served from the same route. Instead, twin tunnels would be built from Terminals 1, 2, 3 to the new terminal., with a pocket track arrangement being built beyond the station platforms where inbound trains enter once all passengers have alighted, and then reverse direction to return to the outbound platform.

Construction of the extension as part of the T5 construction took 6 years, funded by British Airport Authority (BAA). As part of the construction, the Terminal 5 project team shut down two aircraft stands from Terminal 3 so that an access shaft could be constructed. The new junction was then built into a concrete box which connected all the underground tunnels. Heathrow Terminal 4 tube station was closed for 20 months between January 2005 and September 2006 to allow these connecting junctions to be constructed. Train testing started when the extension was handed over to London Underground on 18 July 2007.

The station opened on 27 March 2008 coinciding with that of Heathrow Terminal 5. It was designed by architects HOK in conjunction with Rogers Stirk Harbour + Partners. Although situated underground, parts of the station's roofing are made of translucent ETFE laminate panels, allowing natural daylight to flood down both ends of all six platforms.

Since May 2022, Heathrow Terminal 5 has been served by the Elizabeth line.

== Services ==
Terminal 5 station is the only one at Heathrow Airport where Heathrow Express, Elizabeth line and Piccadilly line services share the same station. The following rail services are provided:

- Piccadilly line from platforms 5 and 6: half the trains on the Heathrow branch terminate here, via Hatton Cross and Heathrow Terminals 2 & 3. The other half do not serve Heathrow Terminal 5, running instead via the loop to service Heathrow Terminal 4 and Heathrow Terminals 2 & 3, before returning eastbound.
- Heathrow Express terminus to and from Paddington station from platforms 3 and 4.
- Elizabeth line terminus to and from Shenfield station from platforms 3 and 4.

Preceding station	London Underground	Following station
Terminus	Piccadilly line Heathrow branch	Heathrow Terminals 2 & 3 towards Cockfosters or Arnos Grove
Preceding station	Heathrow Express	Following station
Terminus	Heathrow Express	Heathrow Terminals 2 & 3 towards London Paddington
Preceding station	Elizabeth line	Following station
Terminus	Elizabeth line	Heathrow Terminals 2 & 3 towards Shenfield

=== Free intra-terminal transfers ===
Until 2012, free transfer was not possible between terminals via the Underground, unlike on the Heathrow Express. In January 2012, free travel was introduced for Oyster card and contactless payment card holders between the Heathrow stations on the Piccadilly line. Journeys from Heathrow Terminal 5 to Terminal 4 via the Piccadilly line require a change at Hatton Cross; this journey is free.

=== Future links ===
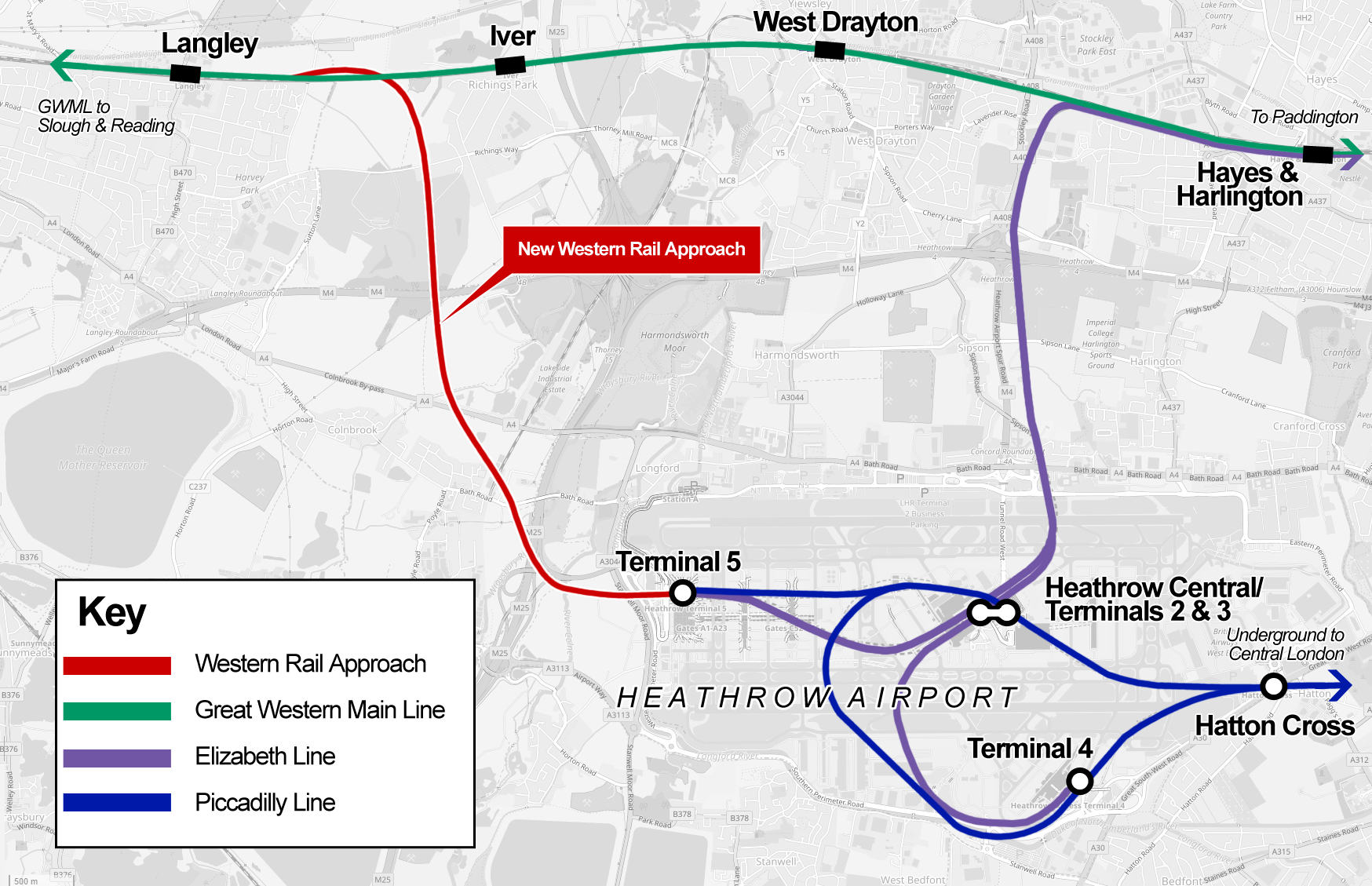
The proposed Western Rail Approach to Heathrow

Network Rail has put forward a proposal for a Western Rail Approach to Heathrow, a short spur of track in tunnel which would run from a junction east of Langley to Terminal 5 station. This would permit Great Western Main Line trains to run directly from Slough and Reading into Heathrow, without the need to change at Paddington. The proposal is currently at consultation stage and remains unconfirmed.

In addition to the above rail links, Terminal 5 station also has two safeguarded "heavy rail" platforms for use by a west-facing connection to the National Rail network. The south-leaning proposal would spur off the Waterloo to Reading Line west of Staines railway station (originally dubbed Heathrow Airtrack, with a newer proposal named Heathrow Southern Railway). It proposes direct rail services to London Waterloo, Reading, Woking, Guildford and Gatwick Airport. Due to the cost of replacing three level crossings, one in a very urban part of Egham, the proposals are currently unfunded.

== Connections ==
London Buses routes 350, 423, 482, 490 and night route N9 serve the station. First Berkshire & The Thames Valley, National Express and Oxford Bus Company also operate connecting bus and coach services.
