= Windsor Link Railway =

Proposed train service in Berkshire, England

Coordinates: 51.477°N 0.456°W

The Windsor Link Railway is a proposed new railway in Windsor, Berkshire, connecting the Great Western and South Western franchise areas and linking both to London Heathrow Airport.

George Bathurst originally proposed the plan in 2009 as part of David Cameron's "Big Society" initiative with the aim of improving rail services to Windsor which is served by two railway stations and appears as a very narrow gap in the sub-region. Originally the cost estimate was £125 million at the most which included contingency.

In 2013, after 4 years, the project was promoted by Windsor Link Railway Limited (WLR), led by businessman George Bathurst. The promoter's aim is for the railway to be entirely privately initiated and financed. The enhanced plan's cost was then estimated at £200 million. The link would enable direct trains between Clapham Junction, Richmond, Twickenham, Staines-upon-Thames to the east and from Slough to the north. Additional expenses may be incurred for road and building construction.

The initial plan was a short tunnel through central Windsor. A proof-of-concept was supported by a major rail infrastructure company.

== Approval process ==
In June 2013, the company announced that Network Rail had approved the next phase of development which entailed seeking private investment. Network Rail stated that was wholly misleading; it did as yet not support or reject the plan.

On 11 December 2013, the Royal Borough of Windsor and Maidenhead (the Borough) received 1,423 signatures in support of looking at the project. This resulted in the project being discussed at full council on 25 February 2014. A unanimous motion was passed in support of the project, noting the petition, encouraging WLR to engage in the planning process and looking forward to further submissions.

In August 2014, WLR announced that it had retained Turner & Townsend to run a competition to select an investment partner. As of August 2019, no investment partner has been identified for the project. As of May 2023, no investment partner has been selected.

In November 2014, a working group of the Borough recommended support of the proposals in its local plan if the national heritage body could confirm no substantial harm to heritage assets would occur. This was confirmed by the borough's cabinet on 26 February 2015.

The Borough passed a unanimous motion encouraging plans to come forward.

Additionally, the local neighbourhood plan included the associated regeneration of the Windsor riverside area in its 'vision day'. The Windsor Observer reported on 31 July 2015 that plans for public consultation on the Windsor Link Railway have been delayed. This was to allow the rail link to be considered in the wider context of a "Windsor regeneration project".

In 2016, BBC News reported that the company had released a 'master plan' for the Windsor Riverside area.

In 2017, the company announced that it had completed a "GRIP 2"-style feasibility report and submitted it to Network Rail. In response, the council announced that it was interested in the proposals for improving the riverside area and was appointed its own consultant GL Hearn.

In a post on the Thames web forum on 13 December 2012, Bathurst stated, "No houses in Windsor or Datchet are necessary to be demolished to provide either the new tunnel in Windsor or the road underpass in Datchet." This was changed later on in the planning process, which impacted several houses in Bridgewater Terrace.

There were multiple local concerns to be addressed, including improving and protecting the riverside environment, and views raised by Cllr Colin Rayner on technical challenges and disruptions during construction. The local concerns include the fact that the link railway track and new station complex and roadways, with their additional commercial offices and related facilities, are planned to be constructed on National Trust land. The construction will be funded by building residential properties along much of the riverside area that overlooks ancient Eton College flood meadows.

Proposals for both phases of the project were submitted to the government on 31 July 2018.

It was rejected by the government in December 2018.

However, in February 2019, two months after being rejected, a letter was sent to the promoters from the Department for Transport stating they had reassessed the case for Phase 1 of the plan (Slough-Staines via a new station at Windsor Royal) and stated that this could have big benefits. This section of the project could be running in five years. This letter has not been publicly shared or published to verify the claims of the promoter of the plan.

In March 2019, an independent political party claiming to represent the interests of the Royal Borough of Windsor and Maidenhead set out its policies in a document called "The Borough First," which opposed the Windsor Link railway.

== Route ==
=== Phase 1 ===
Phase 1 of the plan would run from Slough to Staines, via Chalvey, Windsor, Datchet, Wraysbury and Sunnymeads. A new all-in-one station in the Windsor Goswells would replace the existing two nearby stations (Riverside and Central).

=== Phase 2 ===
Phase 2 of the project involves linking to Heathrow Airport. As the Heathrow Airtrack plan has been dropped by Heathrow Airport Holdings, the proponents say a much cheaper method of connecting Heathrow to the northwest, west, and south would be via a bridge over the M25. This would also have benefits for the proposed inter-modal freight depot at Colnbrook.

=== Possible links ===
Eventually, it was hoped to spur reconnecting the Great Western Railway to Bedford via High Wycombe, Aylesbury and Bletchley, by reopening the link from Bourne End station (achievable by extending the Bourne End branch line a few miles). Other direct services to Heathrow would be enabled from Oxford and from Reading (and the rest of the Great Western routes).

To the south, alternating services from Basingstoke could go to Heathrow and Slough via Frimley (via a re-opened chord), Camberley, Ascot and Virginia Water. This would give most of Hampshire's railway towns a direct connection to Heathrow as well as possibly Dorset's south coast.

By contrast, only enabling Heathrow to be directly accessed from London Paddington or London's Piccadilly line and minor stop Hayes & Harlington fetters rail competition and makes for long rail journey times.

Railnews sees any such link as a step towards a railway around most of London and notes south-central England's East West Rail (Varsity Line) gives another sector renewed connectivity.

== Planning process ==
On 16 September 2014, during a presentation to the Windsor Neighbourhood Plan, WLR made an announcement regarding its projected planning process, which was outlined as follows:

- 2015: Planning policies clarified with local authority
- 2016: Planning permission for 'above ground' (new rail station, transport interchange, parking, restoration of riverside and any associated property development)
- 2018: Transport & Works Act Application
- 2020: Earliest rail works would start
- 2022: Rail link operational

== Background ==
The project is promoted by the Windsor Link Railway Limited, led by businessman George Bathurst. When initially proposed, one resident described the proposal as a "fantasy". Some local politicians have supported the proposal: Councilor Mohammed Rasib, for Chalvey ward and leader of the opposition Conservative group, expressed strong support. Fiona Mactaggart (Member of Parliament for Slough, 1997–2017) said, "Any proposal to bring better rail links is welcomed, although this plan looks a long way from being realized."

"Ministers welcome the proposals for the Windsor Link Railway and look forward to further work on the business case to confirm whether the plan is viable."

Chris Grayling, Secretary of State for Transport, had called for 'new ways of working, new ways of funding improvements.

The Hansford Review, published on 31 July 2017, included the Windsor Link Railway as a case study and called for funding for 'market-led plans' and for pathfinder projects to progress.

In November 2017, the plan was featured in the Spectator. Charles Moore wrote,

Windsor has always had two stations — Central and Riverside — a fact which causes multiple alleged inconveniences. Considering that it is the most visited tourist site outside London, it is absurdly badly connected… [the] Windsor Link Railway plan would create a single Windsor station (putting the historic buildings of the old ones to other uses). Its first phase would link the Great Western region with the South Western, going from Slough, via Windsor, into Waterloo.

An alternative argument is that having two stations connected to two lines (Paddington and Waterloo) that enables commuters from Windsor to reach West and South London more easily and given the lines are operated by different companies, it further allows strike action to be less impactful to the town's commuters.

The proposed plan was also featured in The Daily Telegraph on 7 December 2017 'More privatisation could be the best way to save the rail industry'.

In December 2017, the government announced its Strategic Vision for Rail, calling for more private investment in rail as a way of opening more lines.

New Civil Engineer on 7 December 2018 reported that "The Department for Transport (DfT) told Bathurst that it did not think that the proposed plan’s expected fare revenue matched the capital cost of building the line."

In February 2019, New Civil Engineer reported that the DfT had changed its position and demurred on whether it had carried out an economic assessment. The DfT confirmed the proposed plan had been rejected, quoting "Government’s call for ideas for privately funded railways will hit the buffers because acceptance criteria keep changing, the boss of the rejected Windsor Link Railway (WLR) plan has claimed".

That same month the Windsor Observer reported on a letter to the proponent that had given the plan a 'surprise boost'. The letter, balanced with risks, said the plan "'creates the potential for town development by removing the rail corridor from the surface', adding that 'this could generate significant local benefit'". This letter has not been shared and its content is unverified. As of April 2026, there has been no sign of any furtherance of the proposal.

== Alternative rail link proposals for Heathrow Airport ==
- Western Rail Approach to Heathrow
- Heathrow Airtrack
- Heathrow Southern Railway

== See also ==
- Heathrow Airport transport proposals
