= History of the Crossrail project =

Project development leading to construction of Crossrail

The Crossrail project was first proposed in 1941. It was first proposed to Parliament in 1991 but was rejected in May 1994 due to failure to make the case. It was then proposed by the government as the Crossrail bill in 2005. Crossrail construction started in 2009 and, heavily delayed, the central section of the Crossrail-created Elizabeth line was opened by Elizabeth II on 24 May 2022 with full completion in 2023.

Crossrail timeline
Date	Event
1941–48	First proposals for cross-London railway tunnels put forward by George Dow
1974	London Rail Study Report recommends a Paddington–Liverpool Street "Crossrail" tunnel
1989	Central London Rail Study proposes three Crossrail schemes, including an east–west Paddington/Marylebone–Liverpool Street route
1991	Private bill promoted by London Underground and British Rail submitted to Parliament proposing a Paddington–Liverpool Street tunnel; it is rejected in 1994
2001	Crossrail Ltd is formed; Crossrail scheme promoted through Cross London Rail Links (CLRL)
2004	Senior railway managers promote an expanded regional Superlink scheme
2005	Crossrail Bill put before Parliament
2008	Crossrail Act 2008 receives royal assent
2009	Construction work begins at Canary Wharf
2015	Liverpool Street–Shenfield service transferred to TfL Rail
2016	Queen Elizabeth II announces the Elizabeth line name and unveils the new roundel
2017	New Class 345 trains introduced on Liverpool Street–Shenfield route
2018	Paddington–Heathrow services transfer to TfL Rail
2019	Paddington-Reading services transfer to TfL Rail
2022	Central section of Elizabeth line between Paddington and Abbey Wood route opened by the Queen
2023	Full Elizabeth line route opens
2026	Possible opening of new station at Old Oak Common

== Early proposals ==
The concept of large-diameter tunnels crossing central London to connect Paddington in the west and Liverpool Street in the east was first proposed by railwayman George Dow in The Star newspaper in June 1941. Dow also proposed north–south lines, anticipating the Thameslink lines of post-war years. The project that became Crossrail has origins in the 1943 County of London Plan and 1944 Greater London Plan by Patrick Abercrombie. These led to a specialist investigation by the Railway (London Plan) Committee, appointed in 1944 and reporting in 1946 and 1948. "Route A" would have run from Loughborough Junction to Euston, replacing Blackfriars Bridge and serving largely the same purpose as the Thameslink Programme. "Route F" would have connected Lewisham with Kilburn via Fenchurch Street, Bank, Ludgate Circus, Trafalgar Square, Marble Arch and Marylebone. This was seen as a lower priority than "Route A", but "Route C" was the only one built, as the Victoria line, and with smaller-diameter tube tunnels.

The term '"Crossrail" emerged in the 1974 London Rail Study Report by a steering group set up by the Department of the Environment (DoE) and the Greater London Council (GLC) to look at future transport needs and strategic plans for London and the south-east. The report contained several options for new lines and extensions: the development of the Jubilee line (then called the "Fleet line") to Fenchurch Street; the Jubilee Line Extension ("River line") project; and the Chelsea–Hackney line. The reopening of the Snow Hill Tunnel was proposed, as were two deep-level lines: the Northern Tunnel from Paddington to Liverpool Street, and the Southern Tunnel from Victoria to London Bridge.

The 1974 study estimated that 14,000 passengers would be carried in the peak hour in the Northern Tunnel between Paddington and Marble Arch and 21,000 between Liverpool Street and Ludgate Circus, which would also carry freight. Higher estimates were made for the Southern Tunnel. It commented that "Crossrail" would be similar to the Paris RER and the Hamburg S-Bahn. Reference was also made to through-services to Heathrow Airport. Although the idea was seen as imaginative, only a brief estimate of cost was given: £300 million. A feasibility study was recommended as a high priority so that the practicability and costs of the scheme could be determined. It was also suggested that the alignment of the tunnels should be safeguarded while a final decision was taken.

== Later proposals ==
The Central London Rail Study of 1989 proposed standard (British Rail) structure gauge tunnels linking the existing rail network as the "East–West Crossrail", "City Crossrail", and "North–South Crossrail" schemes. The east–west scheme was for a line from Liverpool Street to Paddington/Marylebone with two connections at its western end linking the tunnel to the Great Western Main Line and the Metropolitan line on the Underground. The City route was shown as a new connection across the City of London linking the Great Northern Route with London Bridge. The north–south line proposed routing West Coast Main Line, Thameslink, and Great Northern trains through Euston and King's Cross/St Pancras, then under the West End via Tottenham Court Road, Piccadilly Circus and Victoria towards Crystal Palace and Hounslow. The report also recommended a number of other schemes including a "Thameslink Metro" route enhancement, and the Chelsea–Hackney line. The cost of the east–west scheme including rolling stock was estimated at £885 million.

In 1991, a private bill was submitted to Parliament for a scheme including a new underground line from Paddington to Liverpool Street. The bill was promoted by London Underground and British Rail, and supported by the government; it was rejected by the Private Bill Committee in 1994 on the grounds that a case had not been made, though the government issued "Safeguarding Directions", protecting the route from any development that would jeopardise future schemes.

In 2001, Cross London Rail Links (CLRL), a 50/50 joint-venture between Transport for London (TfL) and the Department for Transport (DfT), was formed to develop and promote the Crossrail scheme, and also a Wimbledon–Hackney scheme. In 2003 and 2004, over 50 days of exhibitions were held to explain the proposals at over 30 different locations.

== Superlink proposal ==
A more ambitious proposal named "Superlink" was proposed in 2004, at an estimated cost of £13 billion, including additional infrastructure work outside London: in addition to Crossrail's east– west tunnel, lines would connect towns including Cambridge, Ipswich, Southend-on-Sea, Pitsea, Reading, Basingstoke and Northampton. According to the scheme's promoters, the line would carry four times as many passengers and require a lower public subsidy as a result.

The proposal was rejected by Crossrail, and failed to receive the backing of the Mayor of London Ken Livingstone, or the DfT.

== 2005 route development ==
In 2005, ahead of Crossrail's hybrid bill submission, a number of feeder routes were considered by CLRL west of Paddington and east of Liverpool Street. It was viewed given the 24 trains per hour core frequency that two feeder routes each of 12 trains per hour could be taken forward.

In the west, a route to Maidenhead (later extended to Reading) and Heathrow Airport was selected. A route to Kingston using the North London Line west of Turnham Green and part of the Kingston Loop Line west of Richmond was discounted due to conflicts between Kingston Loop services and major construction impacts in the Kingston area, as well as closure of the Richmond District Line branch. A route to High Wycombe joining the Chiltern Main Line using the Greenford to South Ruislip connection was discounted due to conflicts between Chiltern services as well as limited crowding relief. A route to Watford Junction joining the West Coast Main Line at Willesden Junction (later forming part of proposals to extend further to Tring) was discounted due to limited crowding relief and the requirement to relocate the now demolished Old Oak Common TMD at Willesden Junction. Routes were also considered using former and current Metropolitan line tracks joining at Wembley Park. The first option extending to the Watford and Uxbridge branches of the Metropolitan line was discounted due to the existing strong City of London connections afforded by the Metropolitan line. Another option via Aylesbury (via Amersham) and Chesham performed strongly, however was discounted due to contractual conflicts with the then Chiltern franchise and Metropolitan line PPP concession.

In the east, routes to Abbey Wood (curtailed from Ebbsfleet to avoid conflicts with the North Kent lines) and Shenfield were selected. Two routes using the Tilbury line to Grays were considered. The first, following the eventual Shenfield route to Forest Gate and the GOBLIN to Barking was discounted due to significant impacts in the Forest Gate area, and that it would need to be combined with the Shenfield route and thus preclude any route through Canary Wharf. A second route performed better, taking the eventual Abbey Wood branch as far as Custom House, then following the old Beckton alignment through Barking Riverside and joining the Tilbury line at Dagenham Dock, but was discounted due to requiring extensive additional tunneling.

Two routes to Abbey Wood were considered and performed the strongest - in addition to the route selected, an alternative ran through the Greenwich Peninsula and joined the Woolwich line at Charlton. While cheaper than the selected option, this was discounted due to potential conflicts with Southeastern services, significant impacts to the Charlton area, and difficulties identifying feasible station sites on the Greenwich Peninsula.

The selected Shenfield branch was shown to have lower economic benefits than other routes selected, but was chosen due to the improved accessibility into Stratford and the Olympic Park regeneration area, and significant crowding benefits on the Shenfield Metro routes which would release additional capacity for Lee Valley services.

== Approval ==
The Crossrail Bill 2005, a hybrid bill, went through Parliament. The Crossrail Bill Select Committee met between December 2005 and October 2007. It announced an interim decision in July 2006, which called on the promoter to add a station at Woolwich. The Government initially responded that it would not do so as it would jeopardise the affordability of the whole scheme, but the addition of this station was later agreed. While the Bill was still in discussion, Transport Secretary Ruth Kelly issued safeguarding directions in force from January 2008, which protect the path of the proposal and certain extensions beyond it from development which might prevent the Crossrail proposal or possible future extensions.

In February 2008, the Bill moved to the House of Lords, where it was amended by a committee of peers. It received royal assent on 22 July 2008 as the Crossrail Act 2008. It is accompanied by an environmental impact statement, plans and other related information. The Act gives CLRL the powers necessary to build the line. In November 2008, while announcing an agreement for a £230 million contribution from BAA, Transport Minister Andrew Adonis confirmed that funding was still in place despite the global economic downturn. On 4 December 2008, it was announced that TfL and the DfT had signed the Crossrail Sponsors' Agreement. This commits them to financing the project, then projected to cost £15.9 billion, with further contributions from Network Rail, BAA and the City of London. The accompanying Crossrail Sponsors' Requirements commits them to the construction of the full scheme.

On 15 May 2009, Prime Minister Gordon Brown and Mayor of London Boris Johnson attended a ceremony at Canary Wharf to mark the start of construction. On 7 September 2009, the project received £1 billion in funding. The money was lent to TfL by the European Investment Bank.

In the lead-up to the 2010 general election, both the Labour and Conservative parties made manifesto commitments to deliver the railway. The Transport Secretary appointed in May 2010 confirmed that the coalition government was committed to the project. The original planned schedule was that the first trains would run in 2017. In 2010, a Comprehensive Spending Review identified savings of over £1 billion in projected costs, achieved by a simpler, but slower, tunnelling strategy to reduce the number of tunnel boring machines and access shafts required, with trains planned to run on the central section from 2018.

== Ladbroke Grove plans ==
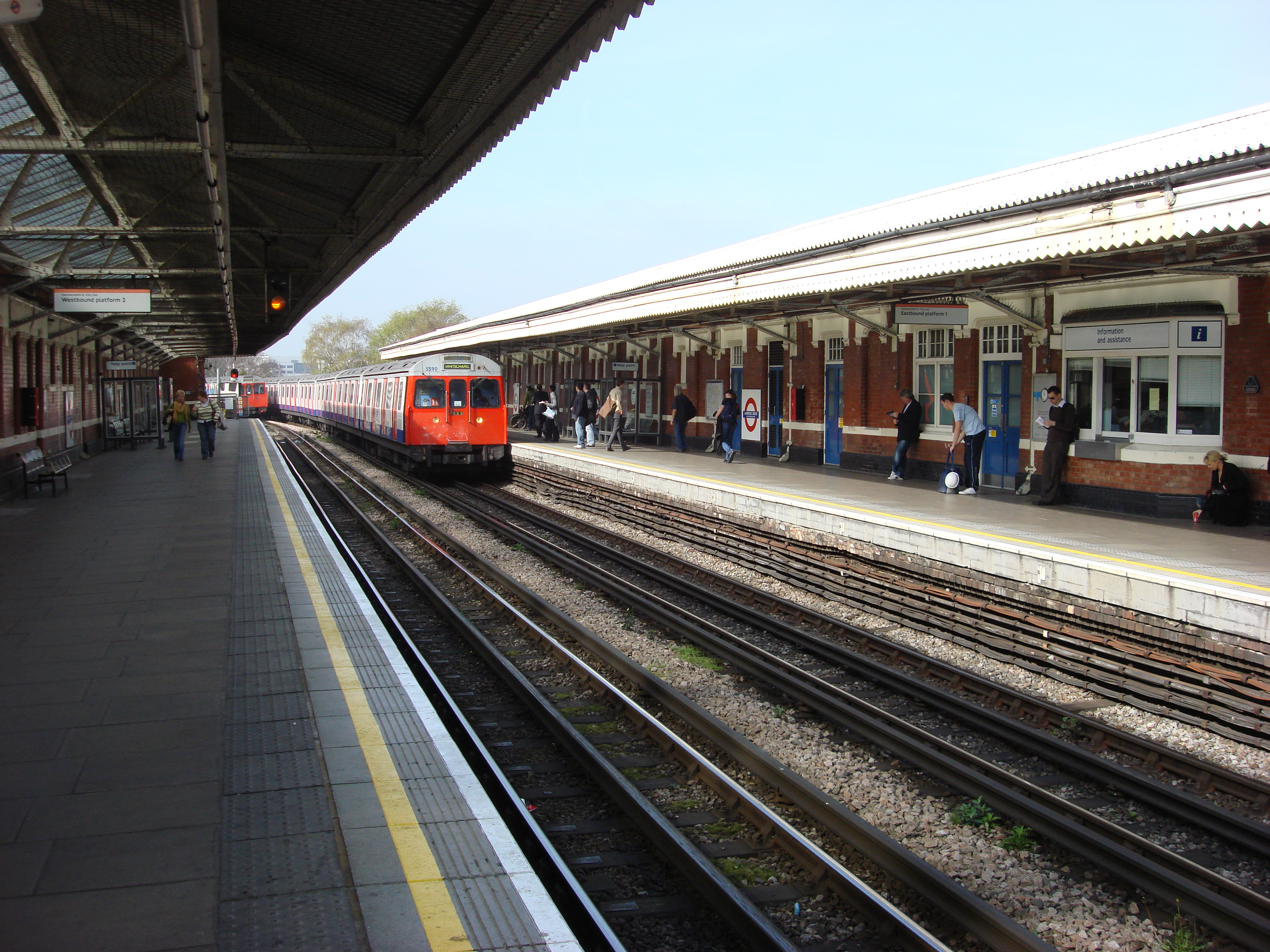
Ladbroke Grove Underground station

The Royal Borough of Kensington & Chelsea was pushing for an additional station in the north of the borough, east of Old Oak Common, at Kensal off Ladbroke Grove and Canal Way. A turn-back facility, now built west of Paddington, could have been sited at Kensal to provide a frequent service to a new station to regenerate that area. Former Mayor Boris Johnson agreed that a station would be added if it met three tests: it must not delay construction of Crossrail, it did not compromise performance of Crossrail or any other railway, and it must not increase Crossrail's overall cost. So the council agreed to underwrite the projected £33 million cost, and a consultancy study that then concluded a Kensal station would not compromise Crossrail.

TfL conducted a feasibility study on the station, and the project was supported by local MPs and residents, the National Grid, and some retailers. It was also supported by the adjoining London Borough of Brent. However, all three Mayoral tests set have not been met, and in early 2013 it was indicated that neither the DfT nor TfL supported the construction of the station, and Crossrail construction continued without planning for a station at Kensal. There was official closure of the issue in April 2013.

The plans were briefly resurrected by Johnson in 2016, but not by incoming Mayor Sadiq Khan.
