= Heathrow Cargo Tunnel =

- Interactive map of Heathrow Cargo Tunnel

Overview
- Location: Heathrow Airport, Greater London, United Kingdom
- Coordinates: 51.464°N 0.456°W

Operation
- Opened: December 1968
- Owner: Heathrow Airport Holdings
- Operator: Heathrow Airport Holdings
- Traffic: Vehicular
- Character: Restricted access freight and passenger

Technical
- Design engineer: Sir William Halcrow and Partners
- Length: 885 m (968 yd)
- No. of lanes: Two (one in each direction)
- Tunnel clearance: 16 ft 6 in (5.03 m)
- Width: 12 ft (3.7 m) each lane

The Heathrow Cargo Tunnel is a road tunnel in the London Borough of Hillingdon, London, UK that serves London Heathrow Airport.

== History ==
In December 1968, the tunnel first opened, to connect Terminals 1, 2 and 3 to the newly opened cargo terminal at Heathrow, and it cost £2 million to build. The tunnel is not open to the public; it is used only by vehicles with security clearance to drive airside. It is used for cargo movements, and transfer of passengers to and from Terminal 4 (In 1986, Terminal 4 was built next to the cargo terminal). From 1972, a London Transport bus service (route 82) operated through the tunnel. In 1986, when Terminal 4 opened, a number of other bus routes then also passed through the tunnel. This was an unusual situation, because anyone could board the bus, and travel "airside" without going through any security checks. In 1989, in the interests of security, all public bus services were withdrawn from the tunnel. All public buses now enter the central area through the main tunnel.

== Design and construction ==
The cargo tunnel is bi-directional; it has one bore, carrying one lane in each direction. Each lane is 12 ft (3.7 m) wide, with a clear height of 16 ft 6 in (5.03 m). The tunnel consists of approximately 625 m (684 yd) of circular bored tunnel plus 130 m (140 yd) of rectangular cut-and-cover tunnel at each end. Its total length is 885 m (968 yd).

The bored tunnel segments are precast concrete, with a 33 ft 9 in (10.29 m) internal diameter and 12 in (30 cm) thick. The segments are expanded directly against the ground, which is London Clay. The bored section of the cargo tunnel is notable among tunnelling engineers, for having been constructed with a remarkably thin cover of solid clay above it (minimum cover 1.2 m (3 ft 11 in) clay beneath the Terrace gravels).

There is one sump system in the tunnel, at a low point about 300 m (330 yd) north of the south portal.

The tunnel is one of the few in the United Kingdom that is ventilated by a fully transverse system – it has an air supply duct in the invert of the tunnel, and an air extract duct in the crown of the tunnel. Extraction and supply fans are sited in underground chambers at the north end and the south end of the tunnel, at the Tunnel Boring Machine (TBM) launch and retrieval chambers.

Consulting Engineer for the works was Sir William Halcrow and Partners, with Hoare Lea & Partners advising on electrical and mechanical services. The tunnel was built by Taylor Woodrow Construction, with E&M fitout by Halliday Hall and Aerex.

The cargo tunnel was the only privately operated road tunnel in the United Kingdom until March 2005, when the Heathrow Airside Road Tunnel was opened to airside traffic next to it.

== Bibliography ==
- Above Us The Skies: The Story of BAA – 1991 (Michael Donne – BAA plc), p. 15
- Muir Wood, A. M. & Gibb, F. R., Design and Construction of the cargo tunnel at Heathrow Airport, London, Paper 7357, Proc. Instn. Civ. Engnrs., Vol 48, 1971
- "Discussion of paper 7357", Proc. Instn. Civ. Engnrs., Vol 48, 1971
