= Heathrow Airport =

Main airport serving London, England

London Heathrow Airport

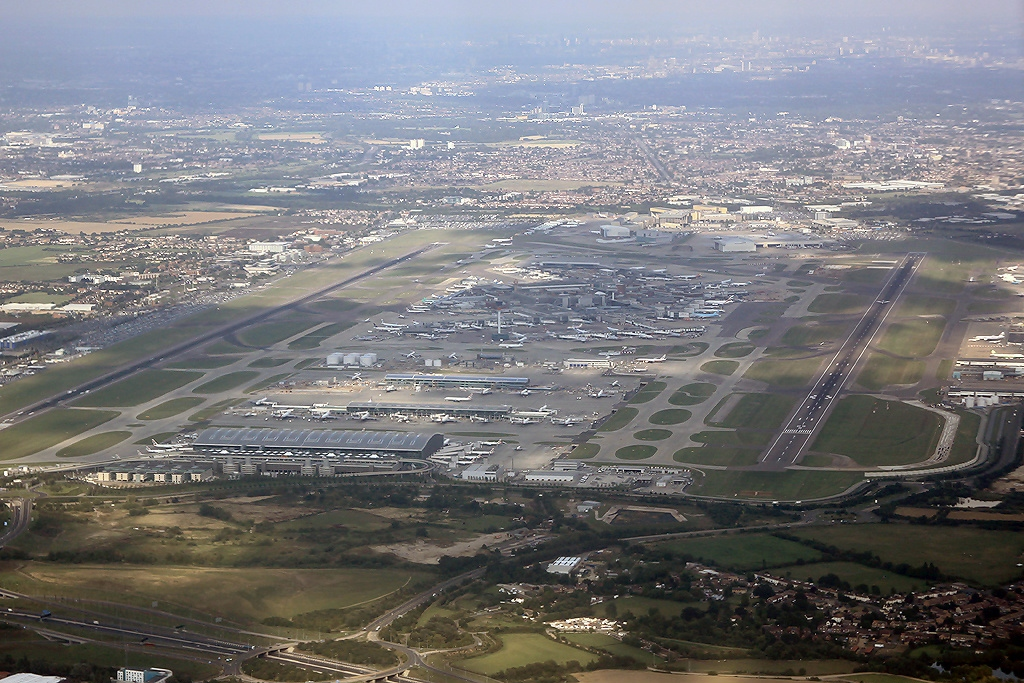
- IATA: LHR; ICAO: EGLL; WMO: 03772

Summary
- Airport type: Public
- Owner/Operator: Heathrow Airport Holdings
- Serves: London
- Location: Hillingdon, London, England
- Opened: 25 March 1946; 80 years ago
- Hub for: British Airways; Virgin Atlantic
- Built: 1929; 97 years ago
- Elevation AMSL: 83 ft (25 m)
- Coordinates: 51°28′39″N 000°27′41″W
- Website: heathrow.com

Maps
- Location within Greater London Location within England Location within the United Kingdom Location within Europe
- Interactive map of London Heathrow Airport

Runways
| Direction | Length | | Surface |
| Direction | m | ft | Surface |
|---|---|---|---|
| 09L/27R | 3,902 | 12,802 | Asphalt |
| 09R/27L | 3,660 | 12,008 | Asphalt |

Statistics (2024)
- Passengers: 83,859,729 ▲
- Rank (world): 7th
- Aircraft movements: 473,965 ▲
- Cargo (tonnes): 1,536,385 ▲
- Sources: CAA, Heathrow Airport Holdings

London Heathrow Airport (IATA: LHR, ICAO: EGLL) – named London Airport until 1966 – is the primary and largest international airport serving London, the capital of England and the United Kingdom. It is the largest of the six international airports in the London airport system (the others being Gatwick, Stansted, Luton, City, and Southend).

The airport is owned and operated by Heathrow Airport Holdings. In 2025, Heathrow was the busiest airport in Europe, the fifth-busiest airport in the world by passenger traffic and the second-busiest airport in the world by international passenger traffic. Heathrow was the airport with the most international connections in the world in 2024.

Heathrow was founded as a small airfield in 1930 but was developed into a much larger airport after World War II. It lies 14 miles (23 km) west of Central London on a site that covers 4.74 square miles (12.3 km^{2}). It was gradually expanded over 75 years and now has two parallel east–west runways, four operational passenger terminals and one cargo terminal. The airport is the primary hub for British Airways and Virgin Atlantic.

== History ==
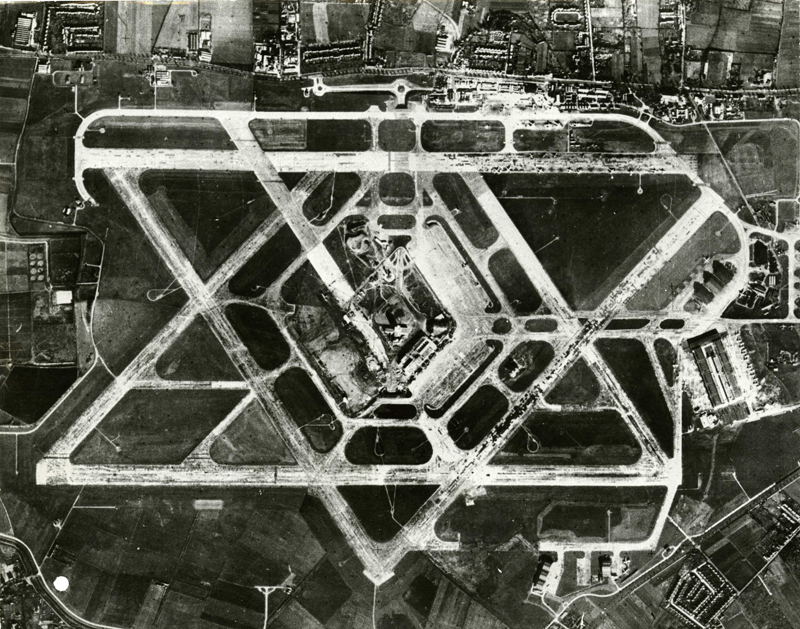
Aerial photo of Heathrow Airport with the original six runways from the 1950s, before the terminals were built.

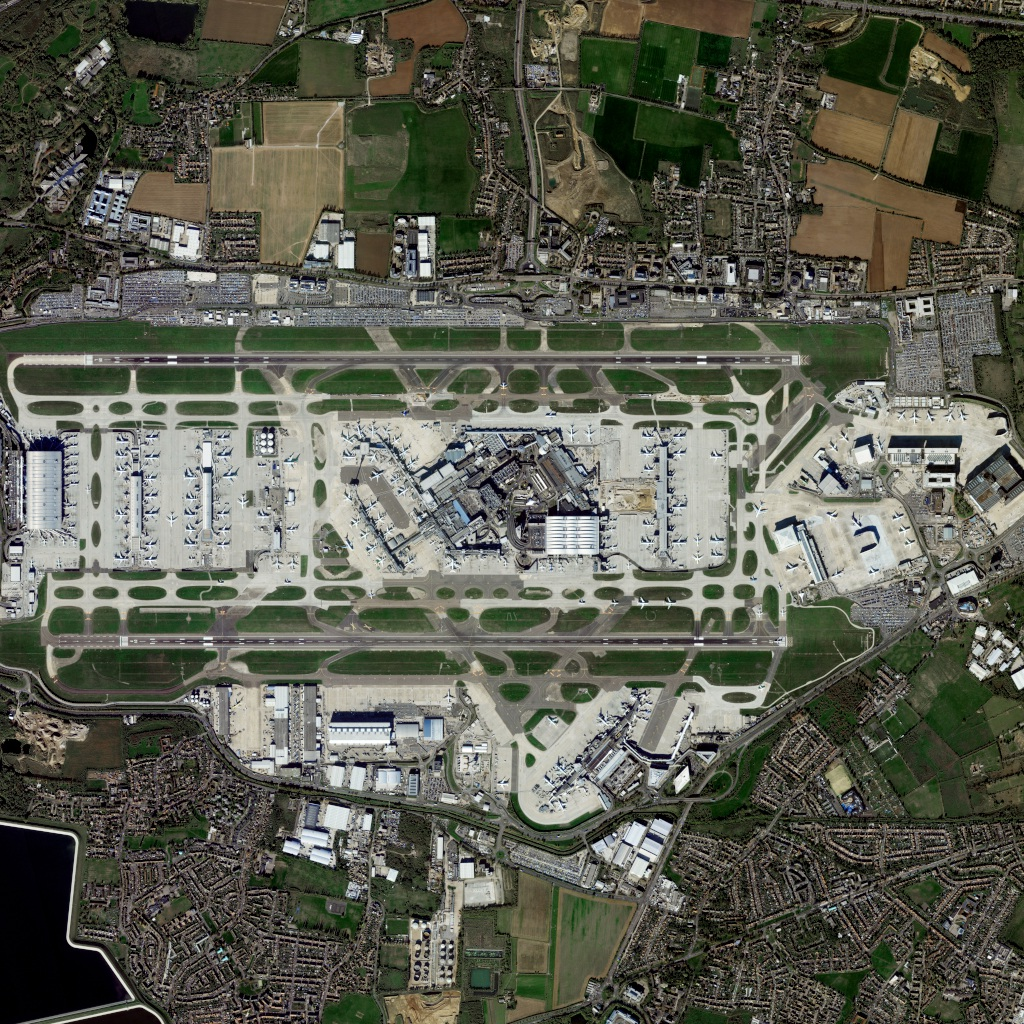
Satellite photo of Heathrow taken by KOMPSAT-3A in 2020.

The airport was opened on 25 March 1946 as London Airport; it was renamed Heathrow Airport in the last week of September 1966, to avoid confusion with the other two main airports which serve London: Gatwick and Stansted. The airport's Central Terminal Area (CTA) was designed by Sir Frederick Gibberd, who set out the terminals and central-area buildings, including the control tower and the multi-faith St George's Chapel.

== Operations ==
=== Facilities ===
Heathrow Airport is used by over 89 airlines flying to 214 destinations in 84 countries. The airport is the primary hub for British Airways and Virgin Atlantic. It has four passenger terminals (numbered 2 to 5) and a cargo terminal. In 2021, Heathrow served 19.4 million passengers, of which 17 million were international and 2.4 million domestic. The busiest year ever recorded was 2024, when 83.9 million passengers travelled through the airport. Heathrow is the UK's largest airport by value, with a network of over 218 destinations worldwide. The busiest single destination in passenger numbers is New York, with over three million passengers flying between Heathrow and JFK Airport in 2021.

In the 1950s, Heathrow had six runways, arranged in three pairs at different angles in the shape of a hexagram with the permanent passenger terminal in the middle and the older terminal along the north edge of the field; two of its runways would always be within 30° of the wind direction. As the required length for runways has grown, Heathrow now has only two parallel runways running east–west. These are extended versions of the two east–west runways from the original hexagram. From the air, almost all of the original runways can still be seen, incorporated into the present taxiway system.

North of the northern runway and the former taxiway and aprons, now the site of extensive car parks, is the entrance to the access tunnel and the site of Heathrow's unofficial "gate guardian". For many years, the home of a 40% scale model of a British Airways Concorde, G-CONC, has been occupied by an Emirates Airbus A380 model since 2008. Heathrow Airport has Anglican, Catholic, Free Church, Hindu, Jewish, Muslim and Sikh chaplains. There is a multi-faith prayer room and counselling room in each terminal, in addition to St. George's Interdenominational Chapel in an underground vault adjacent to the old control tower, where Christian services take place. The chaplains organise and lead prayers at certain times in the prayer room.

The airport has its resident press corps, consisting of six photographers and one TV crew, serving all the major newspapers and television stations around the world.

=== Cargo ===
The top cargo export destinations include the United States, China, and the United Arab Emirates, handling 1.4 million tonnes of cargo in 2022. The top products exported were books, salmon, and medicine.

=== Flight movements ===
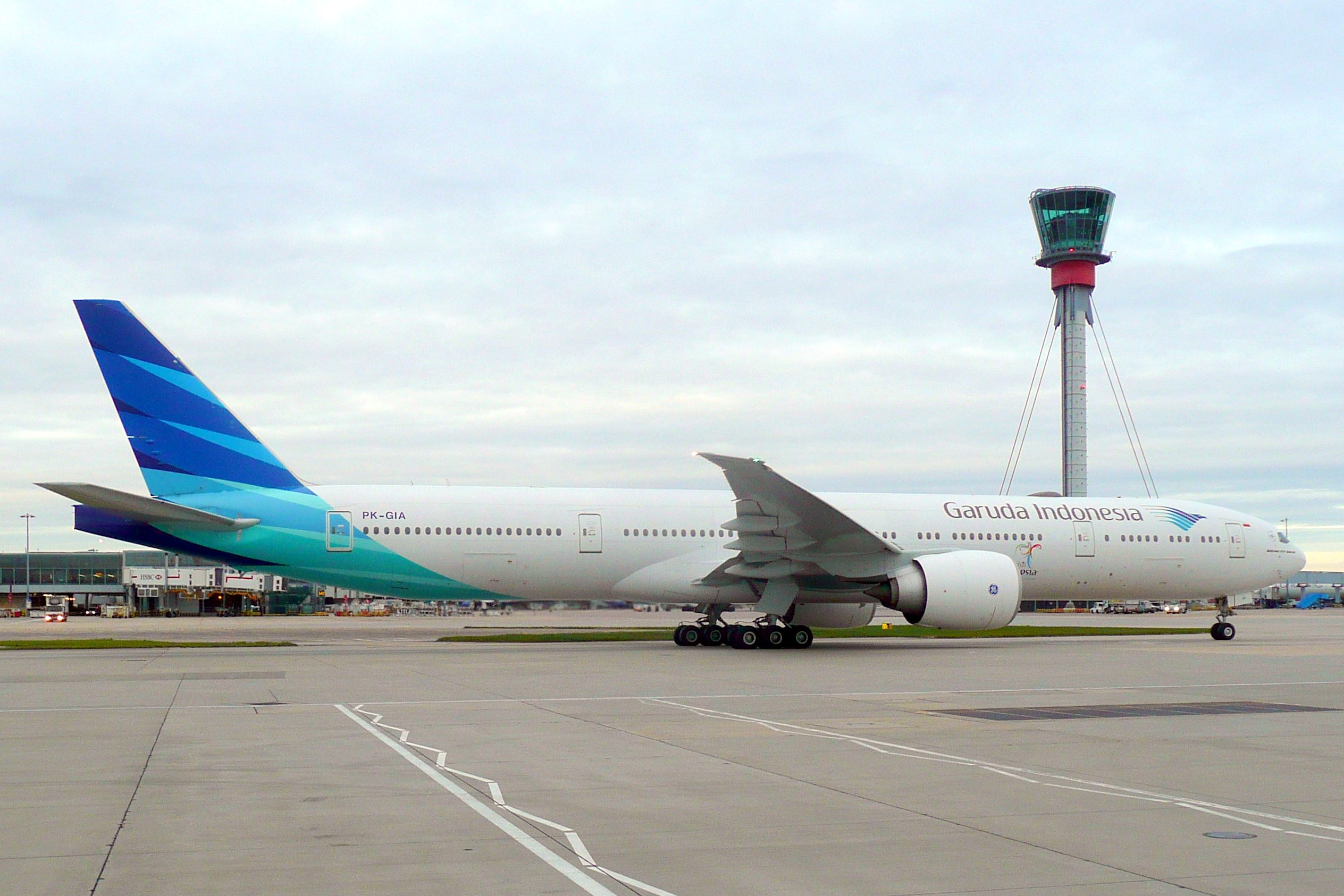
A Garuda Indonesia Boeing 777-300ER taxiing past Heathrow's control tower.

Aircraft destined for Heathrow are usually routed to one of four holding points. Air traffic controllers at Heathrow Approach Control (based in Swanwick, Hampshire) then guide the aircraft to their final approach, merging aircraft from the four holds into a single stream of traffic, sometimes as close as 2.5 nautical miles (4.6 km; 2.9 mi) apart. Considerable use is made of continuous descent approach techniques to minimise the environmental effects of incoming aircraft, particularly at night. Once an aircraft is established on its final approach, control is handed over to Heathrow Tower.

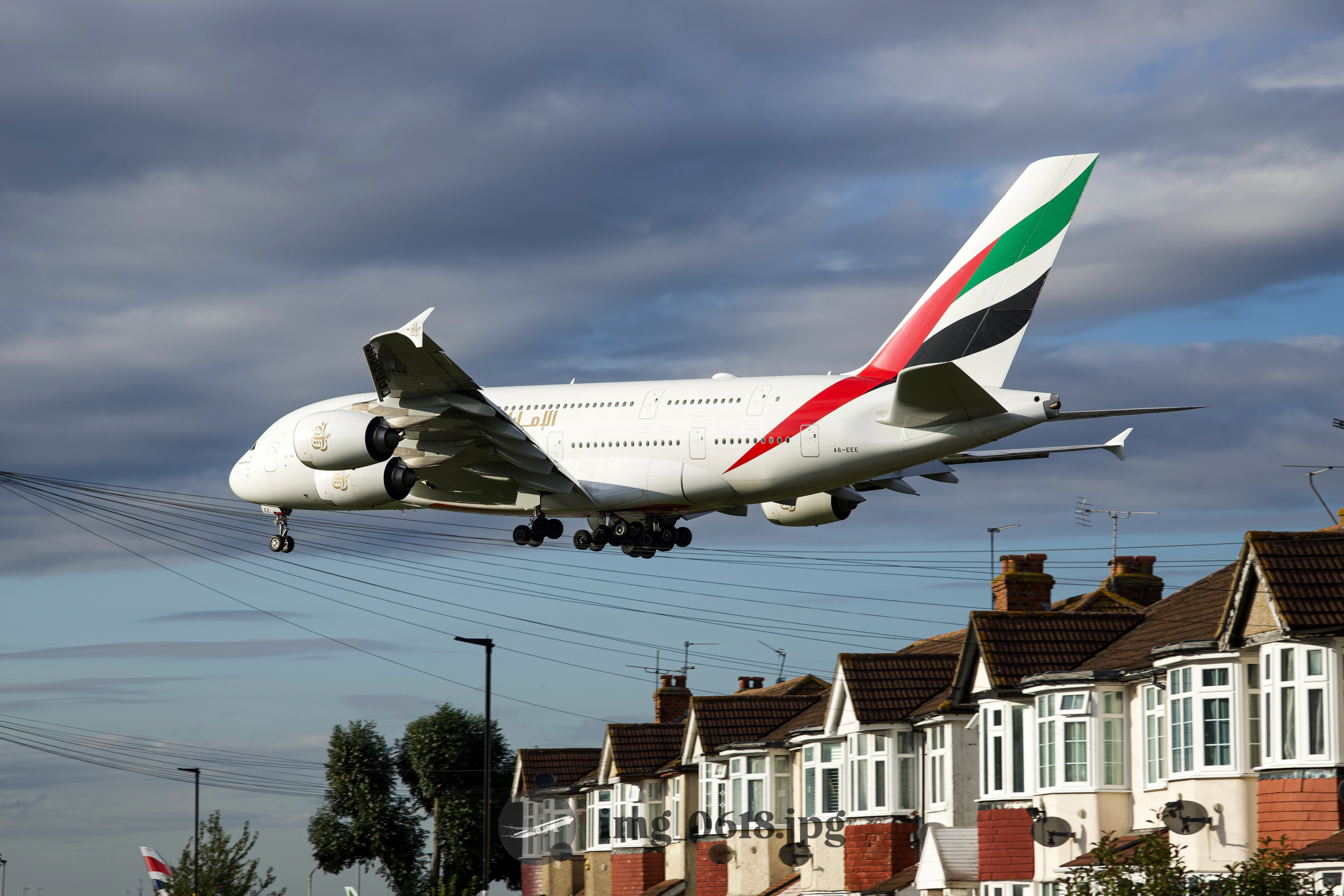
An Emirates Airbus A380-800 passing over Myrtle Avenue on approach to runway 27L at Heathrow.

When runway alternation was introduced, aircraft generated significantly more noise on departure than when landing, so a preference for westerly operations during daylight was introduced, which continues to this day. In this mode, aircraft take off to the west and land from the east over London, thereby minimising noise impact on the most densely populated areas. Heathrow's two runways generally operate in segregated mode, with landings on one runway and takeoffs on the other. To further reduce noise nuisance, the use of runways 27R and 27L is swapped at 15:00 local time each day if the wind is from the west. When landings are easterly, there is no alternation; 09L remains the landing runway and 09R the takeoff runway due to the legacy of the now rescinded Cranford Agreement, pending taxiway works to allow the roles to be reversed. As of 2025, Hillingdon Council is considering plans submitted by Heathrow Airport Limited for infrastructure works to facilitate runway alternation during easterly operations. Occasionally, landings are allowed on the nominated departure runway to help reduce airborne delays and to position landing aircraft closer to their terminal, reducing taxi times.

Night-time flights at Heathrow are subject to restrictions. Between 23:00 and 04:00, the noisiest aircraft (rated QC/8 and QC/16) cannot be scheduled for operation. Also, during the night quota period (23:30–06:00), there are four limits:

- A limit on the number of flights allowed.
- A Quota Count system which limits the total amount of noise permitted, but allows operators to choose to operate fewer noisy aircraft or a greater number of quieter planes.
- QC/4 aircraft cannot be scheduled for operation.
- A voluntary agreement with the airlines that no early-morning arrivals will be scheduled to land before 04:30.

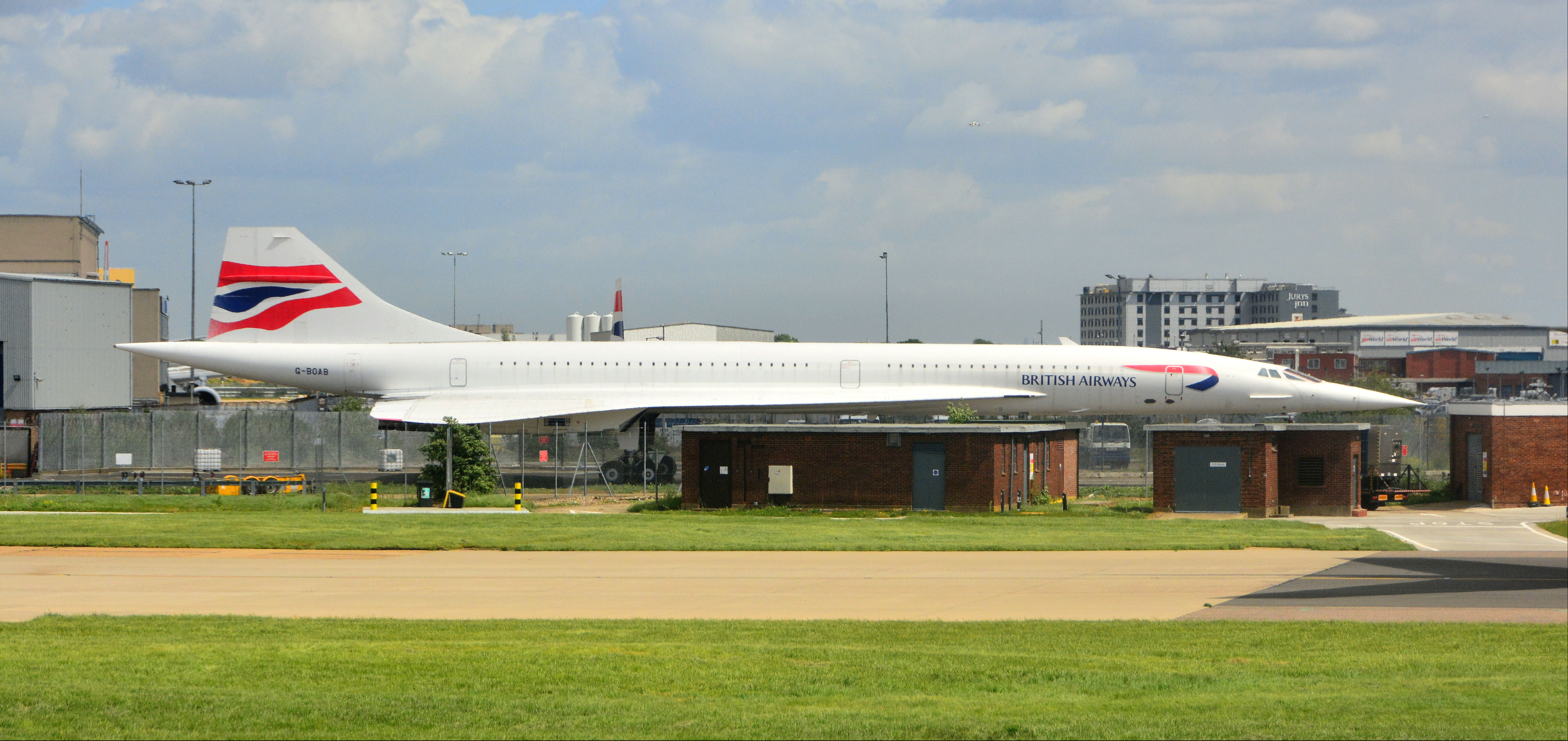
G-BOAB, a former British Airways Concorde pictured in 2014 is preserved at Heathrow next to runway 27L

A trial of "noise-relief zones" ran from December 2012 to March 2013, which concentrated approach flight paths into defined areas, compared with the existing, more spread-out paths. The zones used alternated weekly, meaning residents in the "no-fly" areas received respite from aircraft noise for set periods. However, it was concluded that some residents in other areas experienced more noise as a consequence of the trial and that it should therefore not be taken forward in its current form. Heathrow received more than 25,000 noise complaints in just three months over the summer of 2016, but around half were made by the same ten people.

In the 2010s, the arrival procedures were revised to reduce stacking by introducing variable speed limits and alternative holding procedures.

In 2017, Heathrow introduced "Fly Quiet & Green", a quarterly published league table (suspended in 2020 due to the Covid pandemic) that awards points to the 50 busiest airlines at the airport, ostensibly based on their performance relative to each other across a range of seven environmental benchmarks, such as NO_{x} emissions. Heathrow has acknowledged, but not attempted to refute, criticism over discrepancies and a lack of transparency over the way in which the figures are calculated. The airport has always refused to publish a breakdown showing how many "Fly Quiet points" each performance benchmark has contributed towards the total score it awards to an airline, thereby putting obstacles in the way of any independent auditing of the published results. Among other criticisms of the league table are the unexplained omission of some of the poorer performers among the 50 busiest airlines and the emphasis on relative rather than absolute performance, so an airline could well improve its "Fly Quiet" score quarter-on-quarter even if its environmental performance had in fact worsened over the period. In October 2024, Heathrow finally reinstated the programme, rebadged as "Fly Quieter & Greener". Two more environmental benchmarks were added to the previous seven, but in all other respects, the aforementioned deficiencies of the original scheme remain.

Due to the COVID-19 pandemic, Heathrow has seen a large increase in cargo-only flights, not only by already established carriers operating cargo-only flights using passenger aircraft, but also by several cargo-only airlines.

=== Third runway ===
In September 2012, the British government established the Airports Commission, an independent commission chaired by Sir Howard Davies to examine various options for increasing capacity at UK airports. In July 2015, the commission backed a third runway at Heathrow, which the government approved in October 2016. However, the Court of Appeal rejected this plan, on the basis that the government failed to consider climate change and the environmental impact of aviation. On 16 December 2020, the UK Supreme Court lifted the ban on the third runway expansion, allowing the construction plan to go ahead.

=== Regulation ===
Until it was required to sell Gatwick and Stansted Airports, Heathrow Airport Holdings, owned mostly by FGP and Qatar Investment Authority and CDPQ held a dominant position in the London aviation market and has been heavily regulated by the Civil Aviation Authority (CAA) as to how much it can charge airlines to land. The annual increase in landing charge per passenger was capped at inflation minus 3% until 1 April 2003. From 2003 to 2007, charges rose by inflation plus 6.5% per year, reaching £9.28 per passenger in 2007. In March 2008, the CAA announced that the charge would be allowed to increase by 23.5% to £12.80 from 1 April 2008 and by inflation plus 7.5% for each of the following four years. In April 2013, the CAA announced a proposal for Heathrow to charge fees calculated by inflation minus 1.3%, continuing until 2019. Whilst the charges for landing at Heathrow are determined by the CAA and Heathrow Airport Holdings, the allocation of landing slots to airlines is carried out by Airport Co-ordination Limited (ACL).

Until 2008, air traffic between Heathrow and the United States was strictly governed by the countries' bilateral Bermuda II treaty. The treaty originally allowed only British Airways, Pan Am, and TWA to fly from Heathrow to designated gateways in the US. In 1991, Pan Am and TWA sold their rights to United Airlines and American Airlines, respectively, while Virgin Atlantic was added to the list of airlines allowed to operate on these routes. The Bermuda II Air Service Agreement was superseded by a new "open skies" agreement that the United States signed on 30 April 2007 and came into effect on 30 March 2008. Shortly afterwards, additional US airlines, including Northwest Airlines, Continental Airlines, US Airways and Delta Air Lines, started services to Heathrow after previously having to use Gatwick Airport. Following Brexit, the US and UK signed a new US-UK Air Transport Agreement in November 2020, incorporating the essential elements of Open Skies, which came into effect in March 2021.

The airport was criticised in 2007 for overcrowding and delays; according to Heathrow Airport Holdings, Heathrow's facilities were originally designed to accommodate 55 million passengers annually. The number of passengers using the airport reached a record 70 million in 2012. In 2007 the airport was voted the world's least favourite, alongside Chicago O'Hare, in a TripAdvisor survey. However, the opening of Terminal 5 in 2008 has relieved some pressure on terminal facilities, increasing the airport's terminal capacity to 90 million passengers per year. A tie-up is also in place with McLaren Applied Technologies to optimise the general procedure, reducing delays and pollution.

With only two runways operating at over 98% of their capacity, Heathrow has little room for more flights, although the use of larger aircraft such as the Airbus A380 has allowed some increase in passenger numbers. It is difficult for existing airlines to obtain landing slots to expand their operations at the airport, or for new airlines to start operations. To increase the number of flights, Heathrow Airport Holdings has proposed using the existing two runways in 'mixed mode' whereby aircraft would be allowed to take off and land on the same runway. This would increase the airport's capacity from its current 480,000 movements per year to as many as 550,000 according to former British Airways CEO Willie Walsh. Heathrow Airport Holdings has also proposed building a third runway to the north of the airport, which would significantly increase traffic capacity.

=== Security ===
Policing of the airport is the responsibility of the Aviation Policing Command, a unit of the Metropolitan Police, although the British Army, including armoured vehicles of the Household Cavalry, has occasionally been deployed at the airport during periods of heightened security. Full body scanners are now used at the airport, and passengers who refuse to use them are required to submit to a hand search in a private room. The scanners display passengers' bodies as cartoon figures, with indicators showing where concealed items may be.

For many decades, Heathrow had a reputation for theft from baggage by baggage handlers. This led to the airport being nicknamed "Thiefrow", with periodic arrests of baggage handlers.

Following the widespread disruption caused by reports of drone sightings at Gatwick Airport, and a subsequent incident at Heathrow, a drone-detection system was installed airport-wide to attempt to combat disruption caused by the illegal use of drones.

== Terminals ==
=== Terminal 2 ===
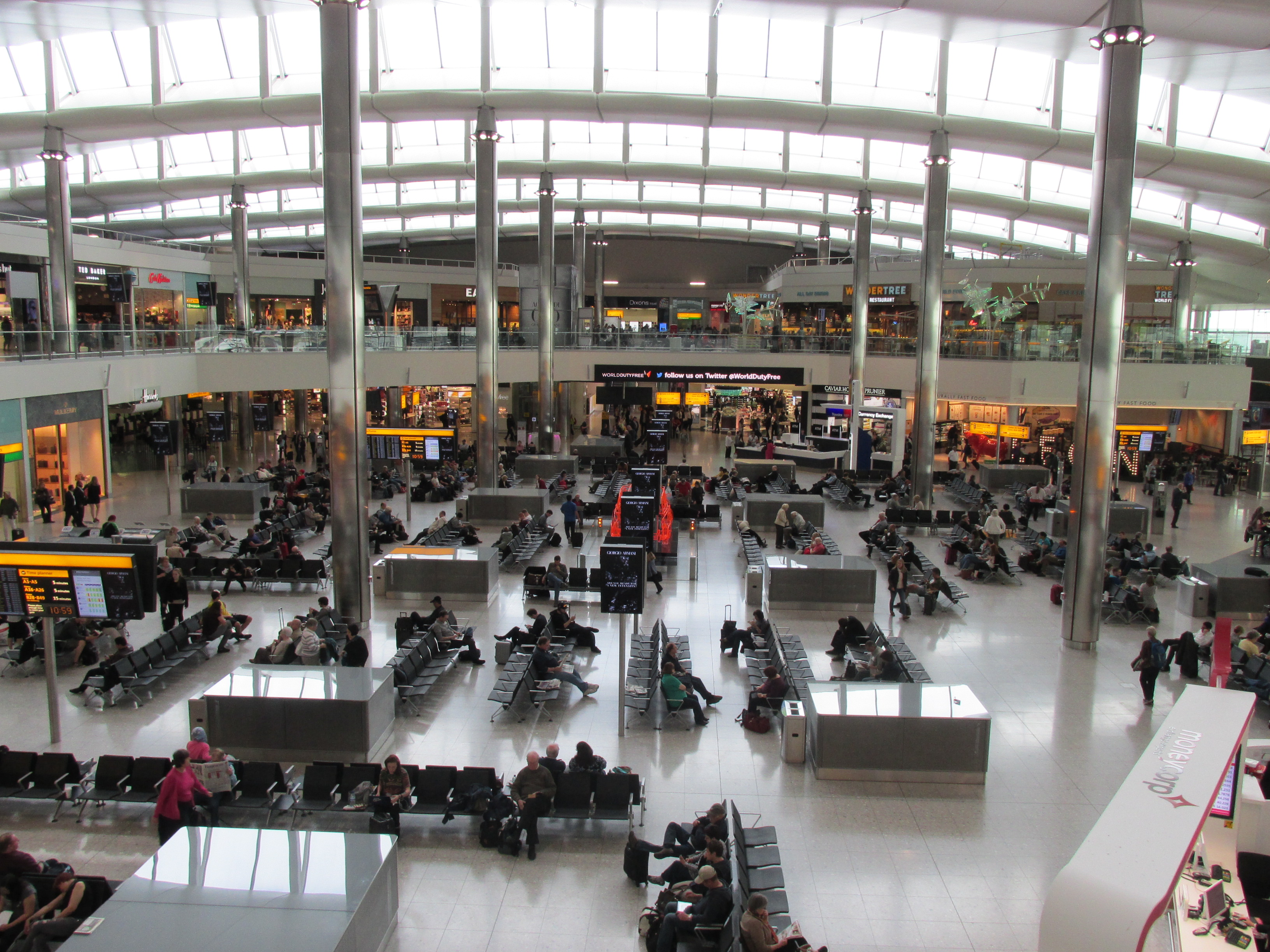
Terminal 2 central departures area

The airport's newest terminal, officially known as the Queen's Terminal, was opened on 4 June 2014 and has 24 gates. Designed by Spanish architect Luis Vidal, it was built on the site that had been occupied by the original Terminal 2 and the Queens Building. The main complex was completed in November 2013 and underwent six months of testing before opening to passengers. It includes a satellite pier (T2B), a 1,340-space car park, and a cooling station to generate chilled water. There are 52 shops, 17 bars, and restaurants.

The airlines moved from their original locations over six months, with only 10% of flights operating from there in the first six weeks (United Airlines' transatlantic flights) to avoid the opening problems seen at Terminal 5. On 4 June 2014, United became the first airline to move into Terminal 2 from Terminals 1 and 4 followed by All Nippon Airways, Air Canada and Air China from Terminal 3. Air New Zealand, Asiana Airlines, Croatia Airlines, LOT Polish Airlines, South African Airways, and TAP Air Portugal moved in on 22 October 2014.

Flights using Terminal 2 primarily originate from northern Europe or western Europe. It is primarily used by Star Alliance airlines (which consolidate under Star Alliance's co-location policy, "Move Under One Roof"). The terminal is also used by a few non-aligned airlines. Terminal 2 is one of the two terminals that operate UK domestic and Irish flights. Although Scandinavian Airlines is now part of the SkyTeam alliance as of 1 September 2024, it still uses Terminal 2.

The original Terminal 2 opened as the Europa Building in 1955 and was the airport's oldest terminal. It had an area of 49,654 m^{2} (534,470 sq ft) and was designed to handle around 1.2 million passengers annually. In its final years, it accommodated up to 8 million. A total of 316 million passengers passed through the terminal in its lifetime. The building was demolished in 2010, along with the Queens Building, which had housed airline company offices.

=== Terminal 3 ===
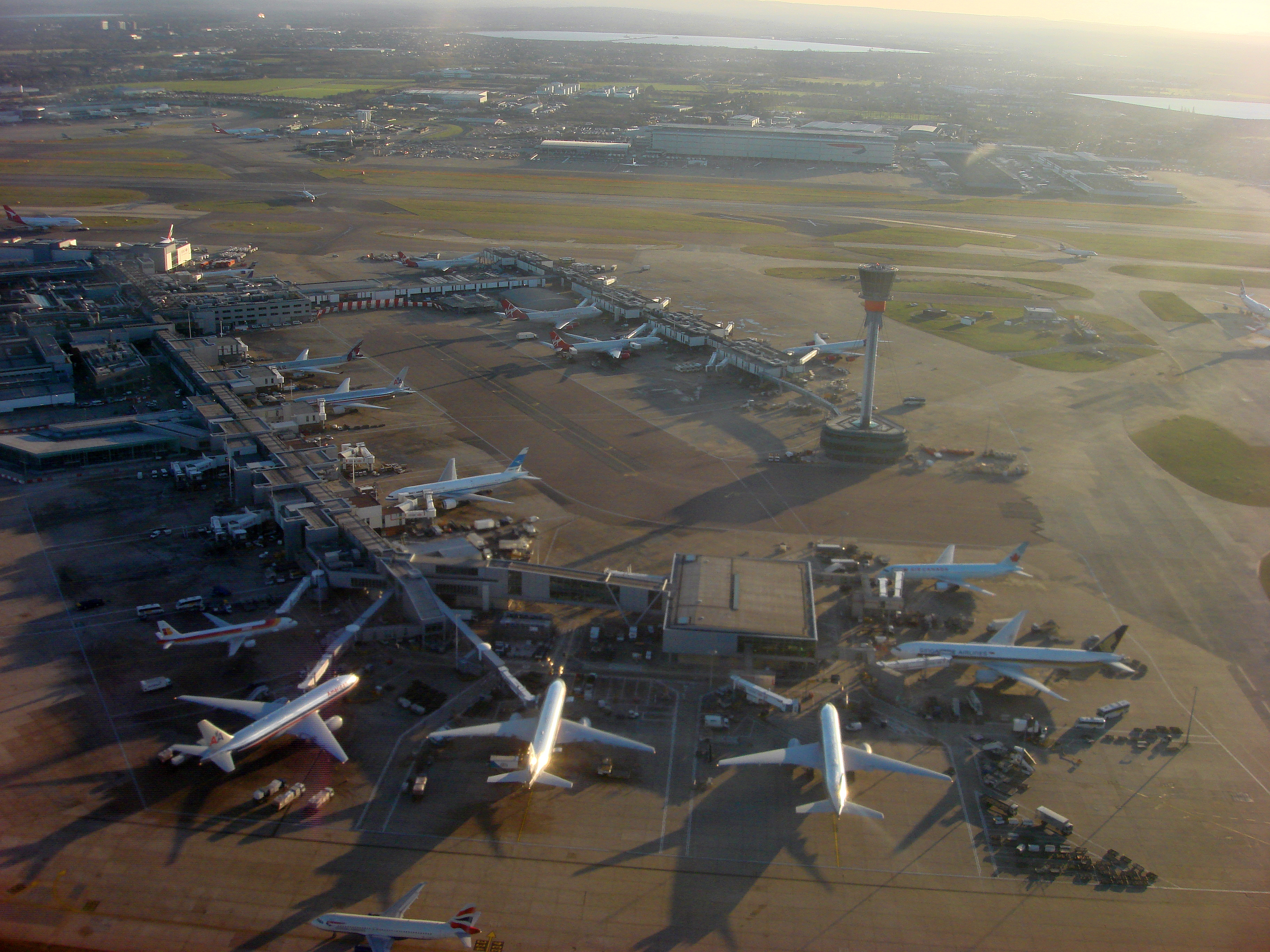
Terminal 3 bird's-eye view

Terminal 3 opened as the Oceanic Terminal on 13 November 1961 to handle departures for long-haul routes to the United States and Asia for foreign carriers. At this time, the airport had a direct helicopter service to central London from the gardens on the roof of the terminal building. Renamed Terminal 3 in 1968, it was expanded in 1970 with the addition of an arrivals building. Other facilities added included the UK's first moving walkways. In 2006, the new £105 million Pier 6 was completed to accommodate the Airbus A380 superjumbo; Emirates and Qantas operate regular flights from Terminal 3 using the Airbus A380.

Redevelopment of Terminal 3's forecourt, including a new four-lane drop-off area and a large pedestrianised plaza, complete with a canopy at the front of the terminal building, was completed in 2007. These improvements were intended to improve passengers' experience, reduce traffic congestion, and improve security. As part of this project, Virgin Atlantic was assigned its dedicated check-in area, known as 'Zone A', which features a large sculpture and atrium.

As of 2013, Terminal 3 has an area of 98,962 m^{2} (1,065,220 sq ft) with 28 gates, and in 2011 it handled 19.8 million passengers on 104,100 flights.

Most flights from Terminal 3 are long-haul flights to America, Asia, and other foreign countries. Terminal 3 is home to Oneworld members (with the exception of Malaysia Airlines, Oman Air, Qatar Airways and Royal Air Maroc, all of which use Terminal 4), SkyTeam members Aeroméxico, China Airlines, Delta Air Lines, Middle East Airlines, Virgin Atlantic, and several long haul unaffiliated carriers. British Airways also operates several flights from this terminal, as do Iberia and Vueling.

=== Terminal 4 ===
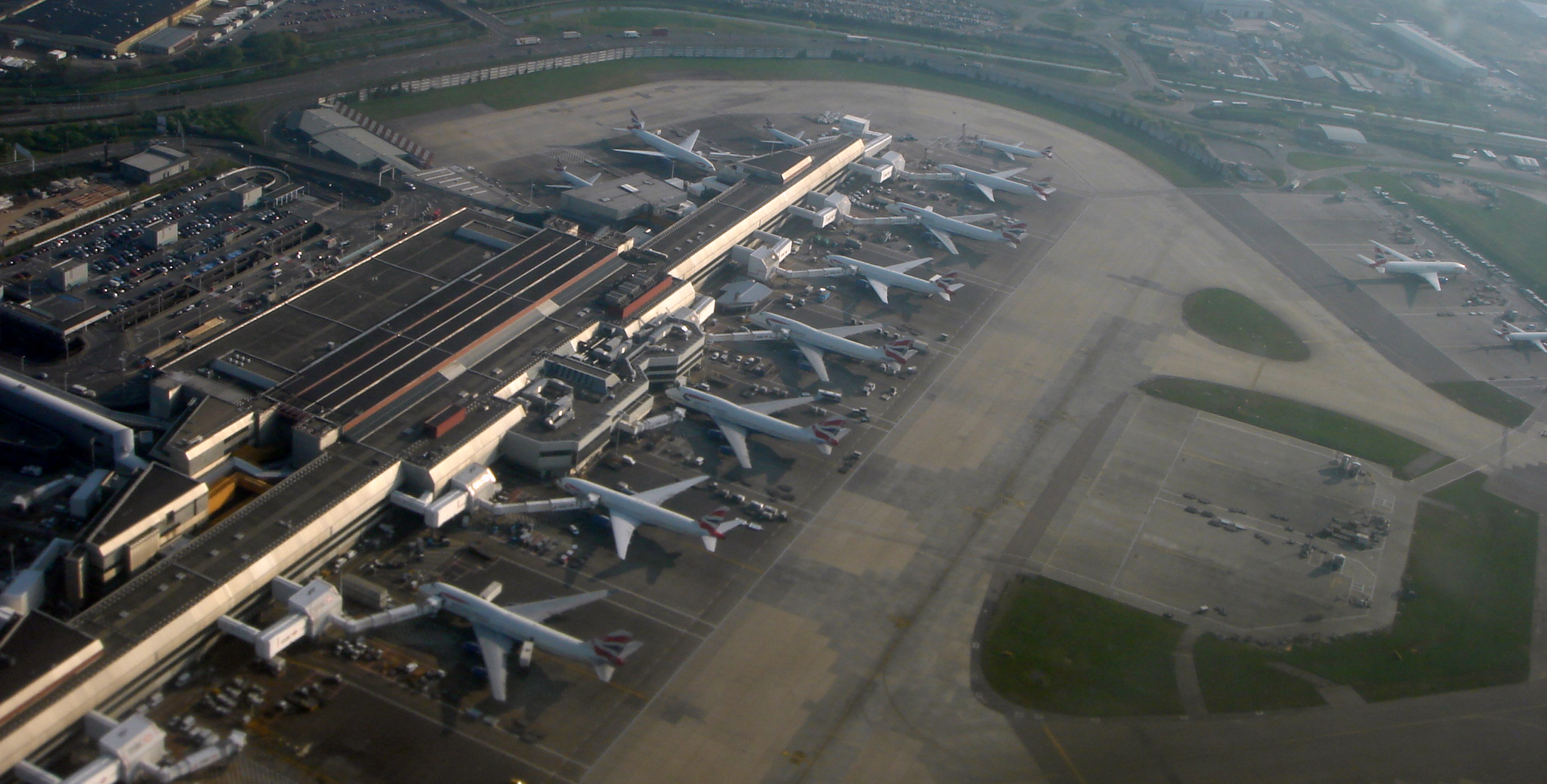
Terminal 4 bird's-eye view

Opened in 1986, Terminal 4 has 22 gates. It is situated to the south of the southern runway next to the cargo terminal and is connected to Terminals 2 and 3 by the Heathrow Cargo Tunnel. The terminal has an area of 105,481 m^{2} (1,135,390 sq ft) and is now home to the SkyTeam alliance; except Scandinavian Airlines which uses Terminal 2, and China Airlines, Aeroméxico, Delta Air Lines, Middle East Airlines, and Virgin Atlantic which use Terminal 3. This terminal is also the base for several Oneworld carriers such as Malaysia Airlines, Qatar Airways, and Royal Air Maroc, besides few unaffiliated carriers such as Etihad Airways, Gulf Air, Royal Brunei Airlines, and WestJet. It has undergone a £200 million upgrade to accommodate 45 airlines, with an upgraded forecourt to reduce traffic congestion and improve security. Most flights using Terminal 4 are those from/to Eastern Europe, Central Asia, North Africa, and the Middle East, as well as a few flights from/to Europe. An extended check-in area with renovated piers and departure lounges and a new baggage system were installed, and four new stands were built to accommodate the Airbus A380; Qatar Airways operates regular A380 flights.

=== Terminal 5 ===
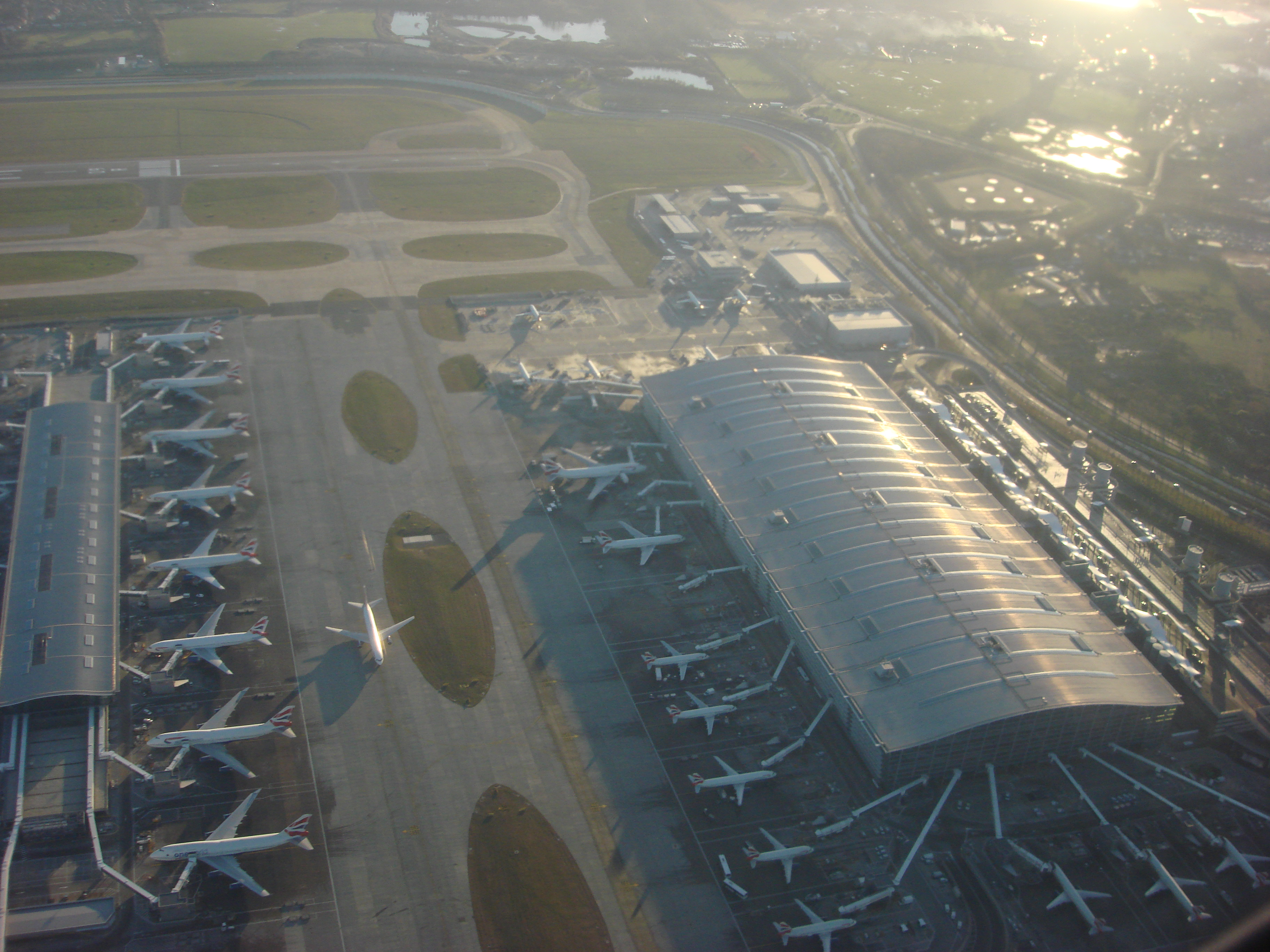
Terminal 5 bird's-eye view

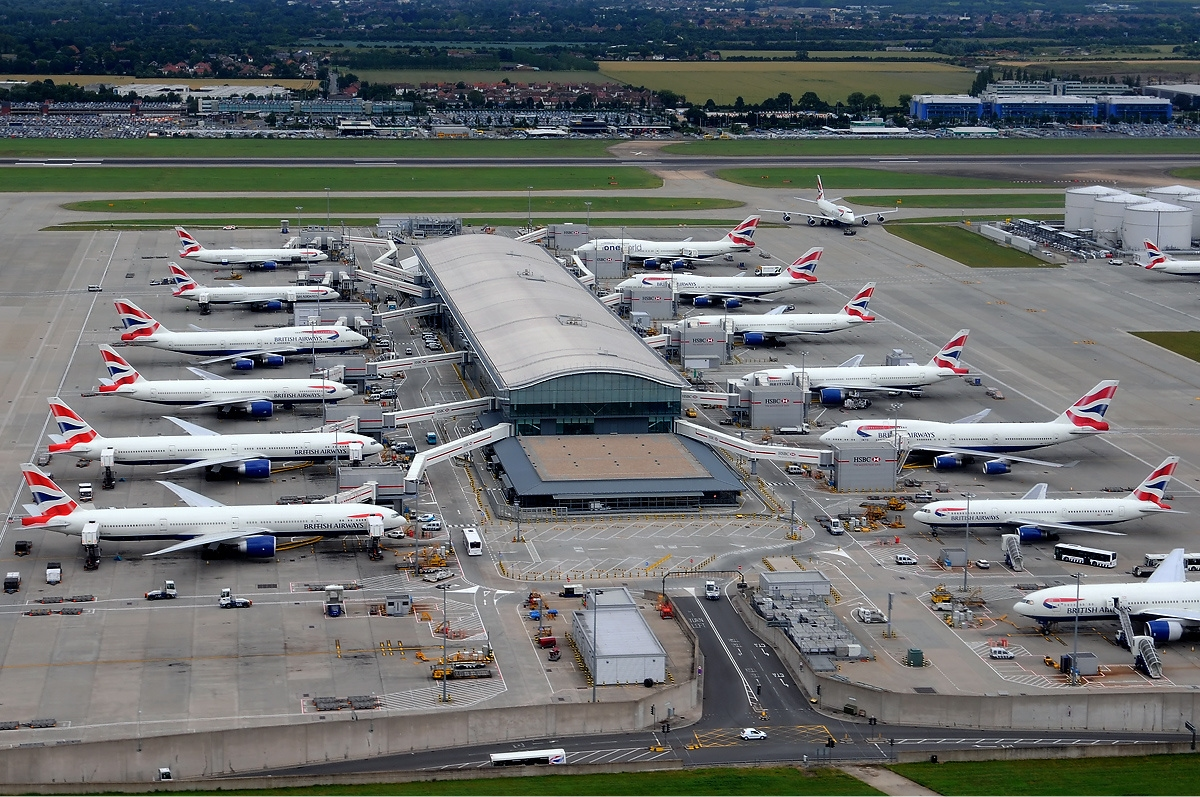
British Airways aircraft at Terminal 5C

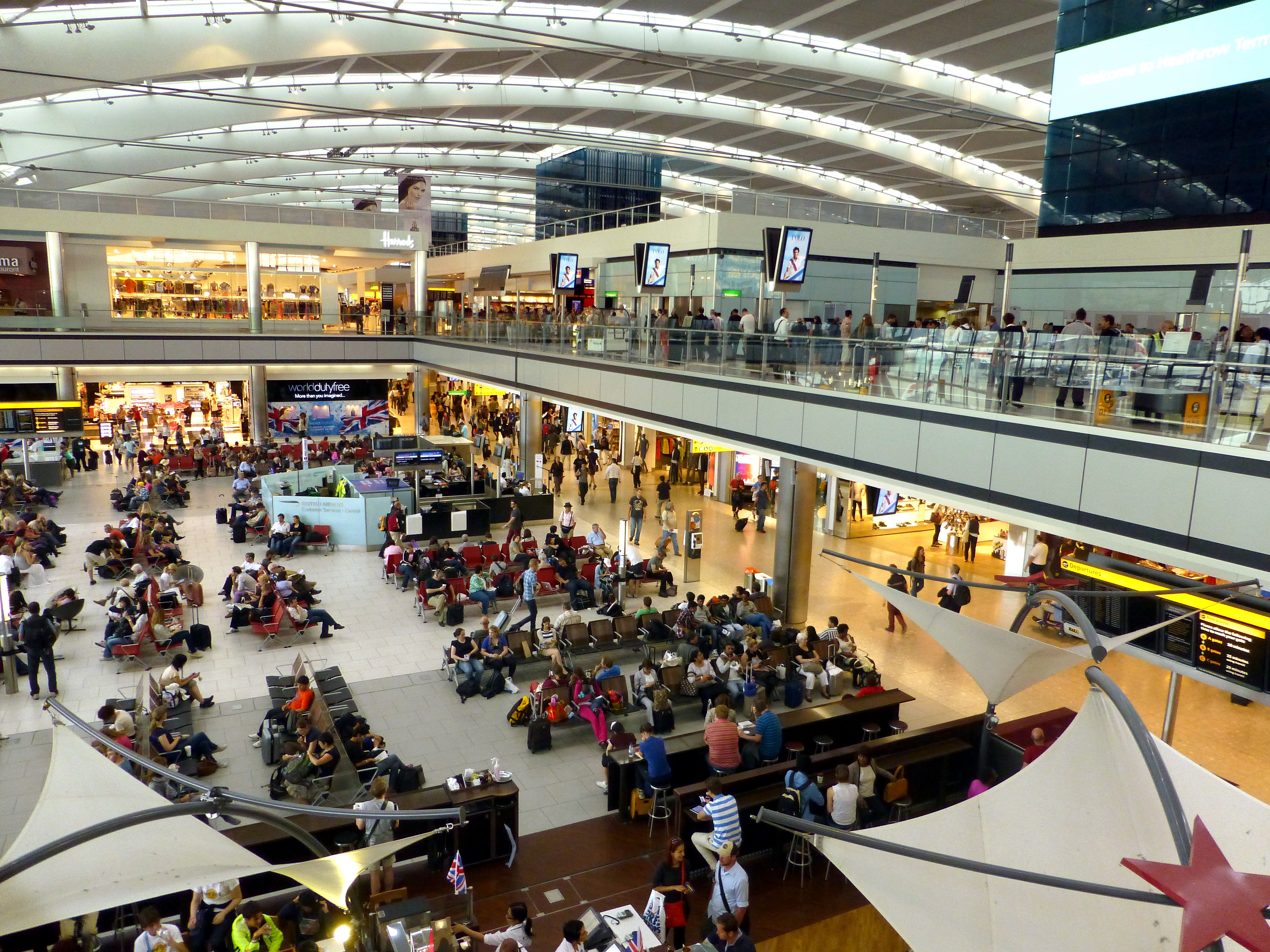
Central waiting area in Terminal 5

Terminal 5 lies between the northern and southern runways at the western end of the Heathrow site and was opened by Queen Elizabeth II on 14 March 2008, 19 years after its inception; then it opened to the public on 27 March 2008. The first passenger to enter Terminal 5 was a UK ex-pat from Kenya who passed through security at 04:30 on the day. He was presented with a boarding pass by British Airways CEO Willie Walsh for the first departing flight, BA302 to Paris. During the two weeks after its opening, operations were disrupted by problems with the terminal's IT systems, coupled with insufficient testing and staff training, resulting in over 500 flights being cancelled.

British Airways exclusively use Terminal 5 as its global hub. However, because of the merger, between 25 March 2012 and 12 July 2022, Iberia's operations at Heathrow were moved to the terminal, making it the home of International Airlines Group. On 12 July 2022, Iberia's flight operations were moved back to Terminal 3. On 7 July 2020, American moved to Terminal 5 to facilitate easier connections between American's transatlantic flights and British Airways flights during the pandemic. China Southern Airlines used Terminal 5 due to the pandemic until it was relocated to Terminal 4 in November 2022.

Built for £4.3 billion, the terminal consists of a four-story main terminal building (Concourse A) and two satellite buildings linked to the main terminal by an underground people mover transit system. Concourse A is dedicated to British Airways' narrowbody fleet for flights around the UK and across Europe. The first satellite (Concourse B) includes dedicated stands for BA and Iberia's widebody fleet except for the Airbus A380, and the second satellite (Concourse C) includes 7 dedicated aircraft stands for the A380. It became fully operational on 1 June 2011. Terminal 5 was voted Skytrax World's Best Airport Terminal 2014 in the Annual World Airport Awards.

The main terminal building (Concourse A) has an area of 300,000 square metres (3,200,000 sq ft) while Concourse B covers 60,000 square metres (650,000 sq ft). It has 60 aircraft stands and capacity for 30 million passengers annually as well as more than 100 shops and restaurants. It is also home to British Airways' Flagship lounge, the Concorde Room, alongside four further British Airways-branded lounges. One of those lounges is the British Airways Arrivals Lounge, which is located land-side.

A further building, designated Concourse D and of similar size to Concourse C, may yet be built to the east of the existing site, providing up to another 16 stands. Following British Airways' merger with Iberia, this may become a priority since the combined business will require accommodation at Heathrow under one roof to maximise the cost savings envisaged under the deal. A proposal for Concourse D was featured in Heathrow's Capital Investment Plan 2009.

The transport network around the airport has been extended to cope with the increase in passenger numbers. New branches of both the Heathrow Express and the Underground's Piccadilly line serve a new shared Heathrow Terminal 5 station. A dedicated motorway spur links the terminal to the M25 (between junctions 14 and 15). The terminal has 3,800 spaces multi-storey car park. A more distant long-stay car park for business passengers is connected to the terminal by a personal rapid transit system, the Heathrow Pod, which became operational in the spring of 2011. An automated people mover (APM) system, known as the Transit, transports airside passengers between the main terminal building and the satellite concourses.

=== Terminal assignments ===
As of 2025, Heathrow's four passenger terminals are assigned as follows:

| Terminal | Airlines and alliances |
|---|---|
| Terminal 2 | Star Alliance, SkyTeam and several non-aligned airlines |
| Terminal 3 | Oneworld (except Iberia, Malaysia Airlines, Oman Air, Qatar Airways, and Royal Air Maroc, as well as some British Airways' destinations), Virgin Atlantic, and several non-aligned airlines |
| Terminal 4 | SkyTeam (except Aeromėxico, China Airlines, Delta Air Lines, Middle East Airlines, Scandinavian Airlines, and Virgin Atlantic) as well as most non-aligned airlines |
| Terminal 5 | British Airways (most destinations) and Iberia |

Following the opening of Terminal 5 in March 2008, a complex programme of terminal moves was implemented. This saw many airlines move to be grouped in terminals by airline alliance as far as possible.

Following the opening of Phase 1 of the new Terminal 2 in June 2014, all Star Alliance member airlines (with the exception of new member Air India which moved in early 2017) along with Aer Lingus and Germanwings relocated to Terminal 2 in a phased process completed on 22 October 2014. Additionally, by 30 June 2015 all airlines left Terminal 1 in preparation for its demolition to make room for the construction of Phase 2 of Terminal 2. Some other airlines made further minor moves at a later point, e.g. Delta Air Lines merging all departures in Terminal 3 instead of a split between Terminals 3 and 4. Iberia moved to Terminal 5 on 1 June 2023.

==== Terminal usage during the COVID-19 pandemic ====
Heathrow Airport has four terminals with a total of 115 gates, 66 of which can support wide-body aircraft and 24 gates that can support an Airbus A380. Due to the COVID-19 pandemic, Heathrow's services were sharply reduced. It announced that as of 6 April 2020, the airport would be transitioning to single-runway operations and that it would be temporarily closing Terminals 3 and 4, moving all remaining flights into Terminals 2 or 5. Dual runway operations were restored in August 2020. Heathrow returned to single-runway operations on 9 November 2020. On 11 December 2020, Heathrow announced Terminal 4 would be shut until the end of 2021. Terminal 4 was used sporadically during 2021 for red list passengers who would be subject to mandatory hotel quarantine. Terminal 3 was reopened for use by Virgin Atlantic and Delta on 15 July 2021, and Terminal 4 was reopened to normal operations on 14 June 2022.

=== Former Terminal 1 ===
Terminal 1 opened in 1968 and was inaugurated by Queen Elizabeth II in April 1969. Terminal 1 was the Heathrow base for British Airways' domestic and European network and a few of its long haul routes before Terminal 5 opened. The acquisition of British Midland International (BMI) in 2012 by British Airways' owner International Airlines Group meant British Airways took over BMI's short-haul and medium-haul destinations from the terminal. Terminal 1 was also the main base for most Star Alliance members, though some were also based at Terminal 3. Before the opening of Terminal 5, all domestic and Common Travel Area departures and arrivals needed to use Terminal 1, which had separate departure piers for these flights.

Terminal 1 closed at the end of June 2015, and the site is now being used to extend Terminal 2 which opened in June 2014. A number of the newer gates used by Terminal 1 were built as part of the Terminal 2 development and are being retained. The last tenants along with British Airways were El Al, Icelandair (moved to Terminal 2 on 25 March 2015) and LATAM Brasil (the third to move in to Terminal 3 on 27 May 2015). British Airways was the last operator in Terminal 1. Two flights of this carrier, one departing to Hanover and one arriving from Baku, marked the terminal closure on 29 June 2015. British Airways operations have been relocated to Terminals 3 and 5. Since closure, it has been used as a location for emergency services' training and testing.

== Airlines and destinations ==
=== Passenger ===
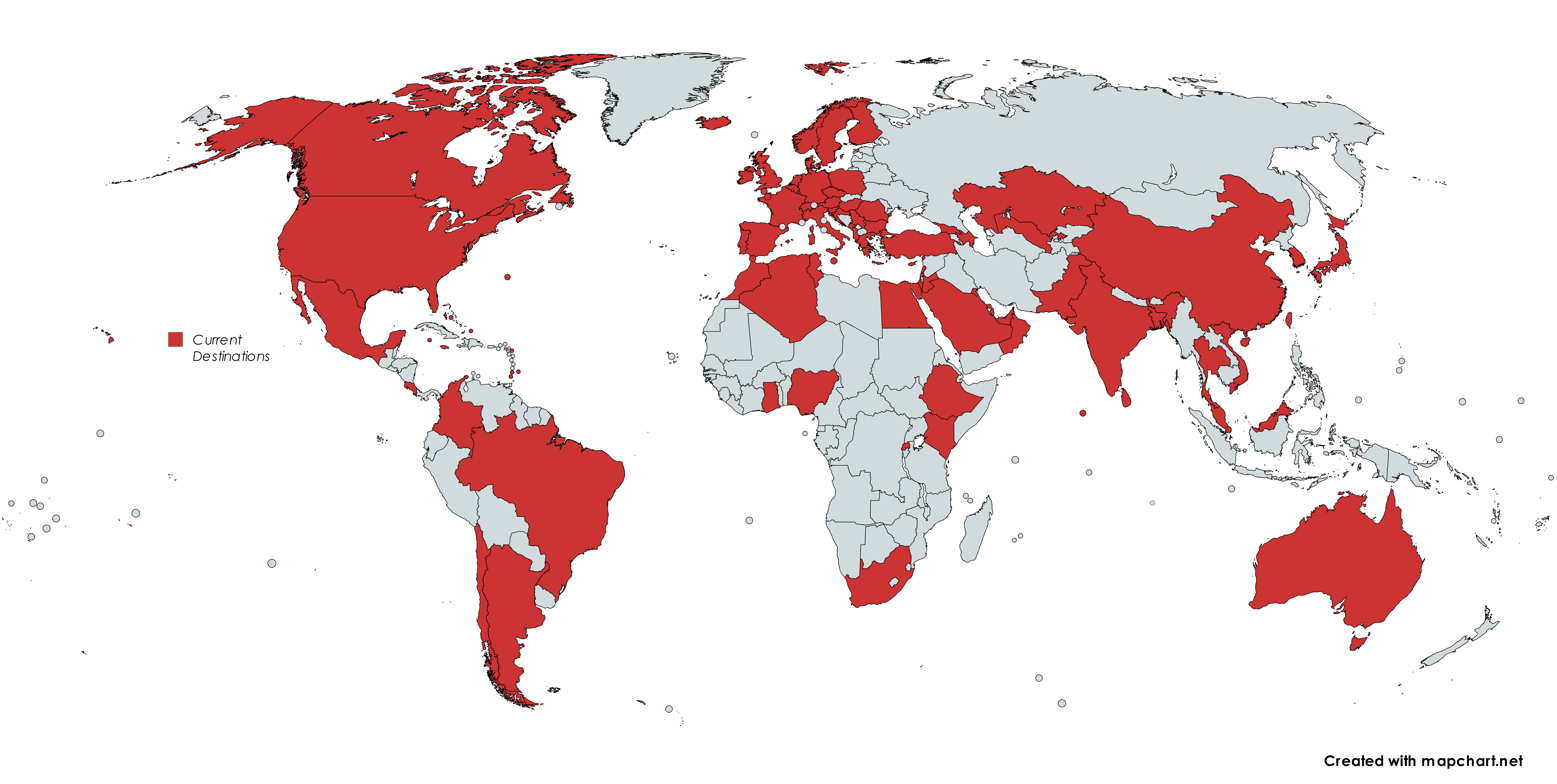
Heathrow Airport passenger destinations

The following airlines operate scheduled passenger flights to and from London Heathrow Airport:

| Airlines | Destinations |
|---|---|
| Aegean Airlines | Athens |
| Aer Lingus | Cork, Dublin, Knock, Shannon |
| Aeroméxico | Mexico City–Benito Juárez |
| Air Algerie | Algiers |
| Air Astana | Almaty |
| Air Canada | Calgary, Halifax, Montréal–Trudeau, Ottawa, Toronto–Pearson, Vancouver |
| Air China | Beijing–Capital, Chengdu–Tianfu |
| Air France | Paris–Charles de Gaulle |
| Air India | Bengaluru, Delhi, Mumbai |
| Air Peace | Abuja |
| Air Serbia | Belgrade |
| Alaska Airlines | Seattle/Tacoma |
| All Nippon Airways | Tokyo–Haneda |
| American Airlines | Boston, Charlotte, Chicago–O'Hare, Dallas/Fort Worth, Los Angeles, Miami, New York–JFK, Philadelphia, Raleigh/Durham; Seasonal: Phoenix–Sky Harbor |
| Asiana Airlines | Seoul–Incheon |
| Austrian Airlines | Vienna |
| Avianca | Bogotá |
| Azerbaijan Airlines | Baku |
| Beijing Capital Airlines | Qingdao |
| BeOnd | Malé (begins 15 December 2026), (Note: Malé service is a continuation of the Red Sea service as the same flight number) Red Sea (begins 15 December 2026) |
| Biman Bangladesh Airlines | Dhaka, Sylhet |
| British Airways | Aberdeen, Abu Dhabi, Abuja, Accra, Amman–Queen Alia, Amsterdam, Athens, Atlanta, Austin, Bahrain, Baltimore, Barbados, Barcelona, Basel/Mulhouse, Belfast–City, Bengaluru, Berlin, Bermuda, Billund, Bologna, Boston, Brussels, Bucharest–Otopeni, Budapest, Buenos Aires–Ezeiza, Cairo, Cape Town, Chennai, Chicago–O'Hare, Cincinnati, Copenhagen, Dallas/Fort Worth, Delhi, Denver, Doha, Dubai–International, Dublin, Düsseldorf, Edinburgh, Florence, Frankfurt, Geneva, Gibraltar, Glasgow, Gothenburg, Grand Cayman, Guernsey, Hamburg, Hanover, Hong Kong, Houston–Intercontinental, Hyderabad, Inverness, Istanbul, Jersey, Johannesburg–O.R. Tambo, Kraków, Kuala Lumpur–International, Lagos, Larnaca, Las Vegas, Lisbon, Los Angeles, Luxembourg, Lyon, Madrid, Málaga, Malé, Manchester, Marrakesh, Marseille, Melbourne (resumes 9 January 2027), (Note: Melbourne service is a continuation of the Kuala Lumpur service as the same flight number) Mexico City–Benito Juárez, Miami, Milan–Linate, Milan–Malpensa, Montréal–Trudeau, Mumbai, Munich, Nairobi–Jomo Kenyatta, Naples, Nashville, Nassau, New Orleans, New York–JFK, Newark, Newcastle upon Tyne, Nice, Oslo, Palermo, Paris–Charles de Gaulle, Philadelphia, Phoenix–Sky Harbor, Pisa, Pittsburgh, Portland (OR), Prague, Providenciales, Reykjavík–Keflavík, Rio de Janeiro–Galeão, Riyadh, Rome–Fiumicino, San Diego, San Francisco, Santiago de Chile, São Paulo–Guarulhos, Seattle/Tacoma, Shanghai–Pudong, Singapore, Sofia, Stockholm–Arlanda, Sydney–Kingsford Smith, (Note: Sydney service is a continuation of the Singapore service as the same flight number) Tampa, Tbilisi, Tel Aviv, Tenerife-South, Tirana, Tokyo–Haneda, Toronto–Pearson, Toulouse, Valencia, Vancouver, Venice, Vienna, Warsaw–Chopin, Washington–Dulles, Zurich; Seasonal: Bergen (resumes 15 April 2027), Bodrum, Brindisi, Chania, Cologne/Bonn (resumes 23 November 2026), Corfu, Dalaman, Dubrovnik, Faro, Figari, Fuerteventura (begins 13 December 2026), Heraklion, Ibiza, Kefalonia, Ljubljana, Mykonos, Nuremberg, Olbia, Palma de Mallorca, Paphos, Perugia, Ponta Delgada, Preveza/Lefkada, Rhodes, Rimini, St. Louis, Salzburg, San José (CR), Santorini, Skiathos (begins 20 May 2027), Split, Thessaloniki, Tivat, Tromsø, Zakynthos |
| Brussels Airlines | Brussels |
| Bulgaria Air | Sofia |
| Cathay Pacific | Hong Kong |
| China Airlines | Taipei–Taoyuan |
| China Eastern Airlines | Shanghai–Pudong |
| China Southern Airlines | Beijing–Daxing, Guangzhou, Wuhan |
| Croatia Airlines | Zagreb; Seasonal: Split |
| Delta Air Lines | Atlanta, Boston, Detroit, Minneapolis/Saint Paul, New York–JFK, Salt Lake City, Seattle/Tacoma |
| EgyptAir | Cairo; Seasonal: Luxor |
| El Al | Tel Aviv |
| Emirates | Dubai–International |
| Ethiopian Airlines | Addis Ababa |
| Etihad Airways | Abu Dhabi |
| Eurowings | Berlin, Düsseldorf, Hamburg, Stuttgart |
| EVA Air | Bangkok–Suvarnabhumi, Taipei–Taoyuan |
| Finnair | Helsinki |
| Gulf Air | Bahrain |
| Hainan Airlines | Changsha, Haikou |
| Iberia | Madrid |
| Icelandair | Reykjavík–Keflavík |
| ITA Airways | Rome–Fiumicino |
| Japan Airlines | Tokyo–Haneda |
| JetBlue | Boston, New York–JFK |
| Kenya Airways | Nairobi–Jomo Kenyatta |
| KLM | Amsterdam |
| KM Malta Airlines | Malta |
| Korean Air | Seoul–Incheon |
| Kuwait Airways | Kuwait City |
| LATAM Brasil | São Paulo–Guarulhos |
| Loganair | Derry, Isle of Man |
| LOT Polish Airlines | Warsaw–Chopin |
| Lufthansa | Frankfurt, Munich; Seasonal: Salzburg |
| Lufthansa City Airlines | Frankfurt, Munich |
| Malaysia Airlines | Kuala Lumpur–International |
| Middle East Airlines | Beirut |
| Oman Air | Muscat |
| Pakistan International Airlines | Islamabad, Lahore |
| Qantas | Melbourne, (Note: Melbourne service is a continuation of the Perth service as the same flight number) Perth, Singapore, Sydney–Kingsford Smith (Note: Sydney service is a continuation of the Singapore service as the same flight number) |
| Qatar Airways | Doha |
| Riyadh Air | Riyadh |
| Royal Air Maroc | Casablanca |
| Royal Brunei Airlines | Bandar Seri Begawan, Dubai–International |
| Royal Jordanian | Amman–Queen Alia |
| RwandAir | Kigali |
| Saudia | Dammam, Jeddah, Riyadh |
| Scandinavian Airlines | Copenhagen, Oslo, Stockholm–Arlanda |
| Shenzhen Airlines | Shenzhen |
| Singapore Airlines | Singapore |
| SriLankan Airlines | Colombo–Bandaranaike |
| Swiss International Air Lines | Geneva, Zurich |
| TAP Air Portugal | Lisbon |
| Thai Airways International | Bangkok–Suvarnabhumi |
| Tianjin Airlines | Chongqing, Tianjin, Xi'an |
| Tunisair | Tunis |
| Turkish Airlines | Istanbul |
| United Airlines | Chicago–O'Hare, Denver, Houston–Intercontinental, Los Angeles, Newark, San Francisco, Washington–Dulles |
| Uzbekistan Airways | Tashkent |
| Vietnam Airlines | Hanoi, Ho Chi Minh City |
| Virgin Atlantic | Antigua, Atlanta, Barbados, Bengaluru, Boston, Cancún, Delhi, Dubai-International (resumes 28 March 2027), Grenada, Johannesburg–O.R. Tambo, Lagos, Las Vegas, Los Angeles, Miami, Montego Bay, Mumbai, New York–JFK, Orlando, St. Vincent–Argyle, San Francisco, Seoul–Incheon, Tampa, Toronto–Pearson, Washington–Dulles; Seasonal: Cape Town, Malé, Phuket, Seattle/Tacoma |
| Vueling | Barcelona, Bilbao, Paris–Orly, Seville |
| WestJet | Calgary |
| XiamenAir | Seasonal: Xiamen |

=== Cargo ===
| Airlines | Destinations |
|---|---|
| Aerotranscargo | Astana, Hong Kong |
| Cathay Cargo | Hong Kong, Paris–Charles de Gaulle |
| DHL Aviation | Amsterdam, Brussels, Cincinnati, Leipzig/Halle, Milan–Malpensa |
| Korean Air Cargo | Frankfurt, Paris–Charles de Gaulle, Seoul–Incheon |
| Lufthansa Cargo | Frankfurt |
| One Air | Jinan |
| Qatar Airways Cargo | Doha, Munich |
| Singapore Airlines Cargo | Amsterdam, Sharjah, Singapore |
| Virgin Atlantic | Seasonal: Brussels |

== Air traffic and statistics ==
=== Overview ===
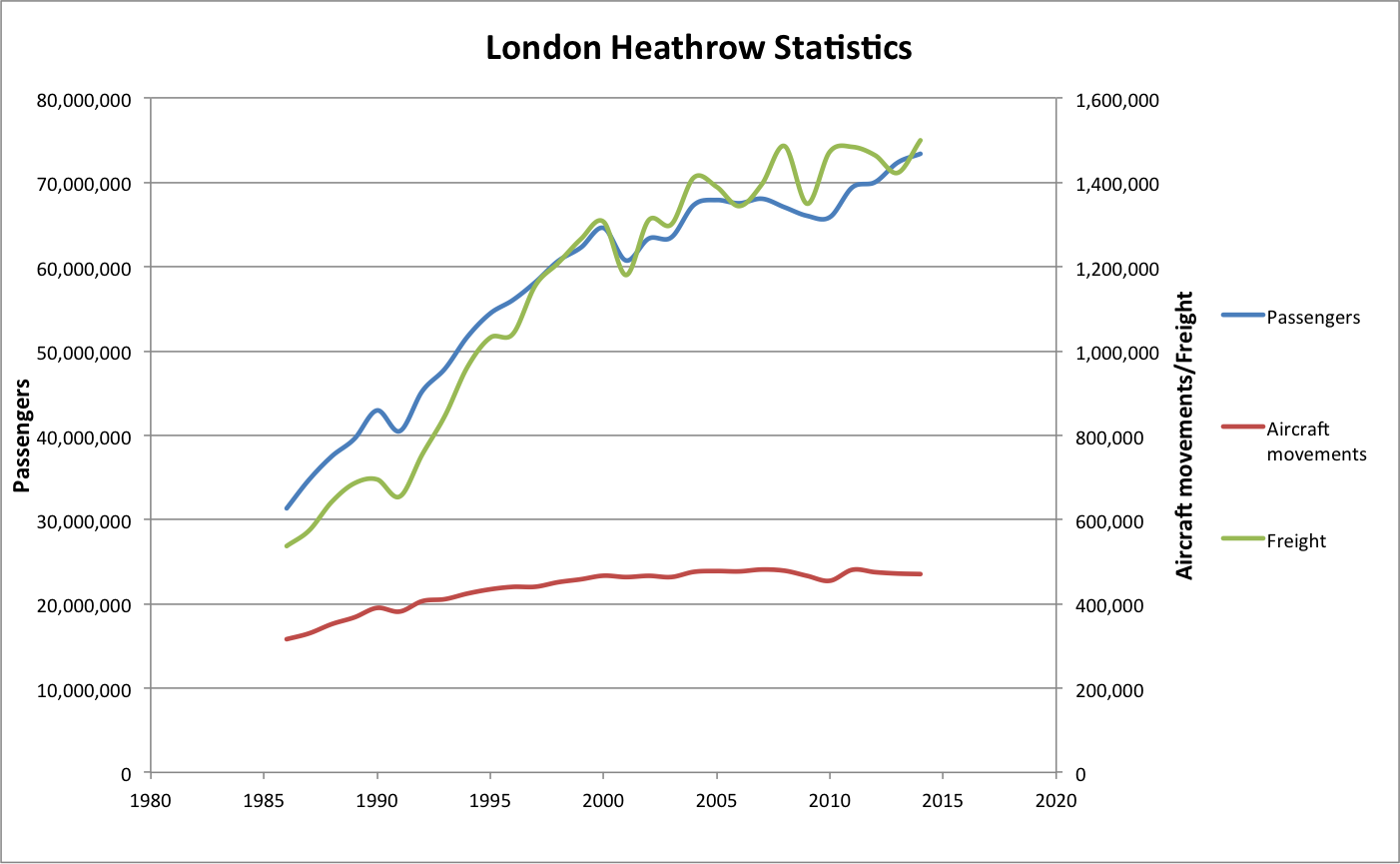
Development of passenger numbers, aircraft movements and air freight between 1986 and 2014

When ranked by passenger traffic, Heathrow is the eighth busiest airport internationally, behind Hartsfield–Jackson Atlanta International Airport, Dallas/Fort Worth International Airport, Denver International Airport, Chicago O'Hare International Airport, Dubai International Airport, Los Angeles International Airport, and Istanbul Airport, for the 12 months ending December 2022. London Heathrow Airport was noted as the best-connected airport globally in 2019 according to the OAG's Megahubs Index with a connectivity score of 317. Dominant carrier British Airways was recorded as holding a 51% share of flights at the hub.

In 2015, Heathrow was the busiest airport in Europe in total passenger traffic, with 14% more passengers than Paris–Charles de Gaulle Airport and 22% more than Istanbul Atatürk Airport. Heathrow was the fourth busiest European airport by cargo traffic in 2013, after Frankfurt Airport, Paris–Charles de Gaulle and Amsterdam Airport Schiphol.

In 2020, Heathrow's passenger numbers dropped sharply by over 72%, (a decrease of 58 million travellers compared to 2019), due to the impact caused by restrictions and/or travel bans caused by the global COVID-19 pandemic. More than four million passengers travelled on domestic and international flights in and out of Heathrow in March 2023, meaning it was once again the busiest airport in Europe after falling to the second spot in November 2022.

On 29 November 2024, it was reported that Heathrow Airport is testing the usage of Artificial Intelligence, a system known as Amy, to assist air controllers in managing one of the world's busiest airports. The system, which relies heavily on the efficiency of coordination, is capable of tracking aircraft across a wide airspace with the combination of radar and video data collected from the ground.

=== Annual traffic statistics ===
Annual traffic statistics at Heathrow
| Year | Passengers handled (Note: Number of passengers including domestic, international and transit) | | Cargo | | Aircraft movements | |
| Year | Numbers | % change | (tonnes) | % change | Numbers | % change |
|---|---|---|---|---|---|---|
| 1986 | 31,675,779 | Steady | 537,131 | Steady | 315,753 | Steady |
| 1987 | 35,079,755 | ▲10.7 | 574,116 | ▲6.9 | 329,977 | ▲4.3 |
| 1988 | 37,840,503 | ▲7.9 | 642,147 | ▲11.8 | 351,592 | ▲6.1 |
| 1989 | 39,881,922 | ▲5.4 | 686,170 | ▲6.9 | 368,429 | ▲4.6 |
| 1990 | 42,950,512 | ▲7.7 | 695,347 | ▲1.3 | 390,372 | ▲5.6 |
| 1991 | 40,494,575 | ▼5.7 | 654,625 | ▼5.9 | 381,724 | ▼2.3 |
| 1992 | 45,242,591 | ▲11.7 | 754,770 | ▲15.3 | 406,481 | ▲6.1 |
| 1993 | 47,899,081 | ▲5.9 | 846,486 | ▲12.2 | 411,173 | ▲1.1 |
| 1994 | 51,713,366 | ▲8.0 | 962,738 | ▲13.7 | 424,557 | ▲3.2 |
| 1995 | 54,461,597 | ▲5.3 | 1,031,639 | ▲7.2 | 434,525 | ▲2.3 |
| 1996 | 56,049,706 | ▲2.9 | 1,040,486 | ▲0.9 | 440,343 | ▲1.3 |
| 1997 | 58,185,398 | ▲3.8 | 1,156,104 | ▲11.1 | 440,631 | ▲0.1 |
| 1998 | 60,683,988 | ▲4.3 | 1,208,893 | ▲4.6 | 451,382 | ▲2.4 |
| 1999 | 62,268,292 | ▲2.6 | 1,265,495 | ▲4.7 | 458,300 | ▲1.5 |
| 2000 | 64,618,254 | ▲3.8 | 1,306,905 | ▲3.3 | 466,799 | ▲1.8 |
| 2001 | 60,764,924 | ▼6.0 | 1,180,306 | ▼9.6 | 463,567 | ▼0.7 |
| 2002 | 63,362,097 | ▲4.3 | 1,234,940 | ▲4.6 | 466,545 | ▲0.6 |
| 2003 | 63,495,367 | ▲0.2 | 1,223,439 | ▼0.9 | 463,650 | ▼0.6 |
| 2004 | 67,342,743 | ▲6.1 | 1,325,173 | ▲8.3 | 476,001 | ▲2.6 |
| 2005 | 67,913,153 | ▲0.8 | 1,305,686 | ▼1.5 | 477,887 | ▲0.4 |
| 2006 | 67,527,923 | ▼0.6 | 1,264,129 | ▼3.2 | 477,048 | ▼0.2 |
| 2007 | 68,066,028 | ▲0.8 | 1,310,987 | ▲3.7 | 481,476 | ▲0.9 |
| 2008 | 67,054,745 | ▼1.5 | 1,397,054 | ▲6.6 | 478,693 | ▼0.6 |
| 2009 | 66,036,957 | ▼1.5 | 1,277,650 | ▼8.5 | 466,393 | ▼2.6 |
| 2010 | 65,881,660 | ▼0.2 | 1,472,988 | ▲15.3 | 454,823 | ▼2.5 |
| 2011 | 69,433,230 | ▲5.4 | 1,484,351 | ▲0.8 | 480,906 | ▲5.4 |
| 2012 | 70,037,417 | ▲0.9 | 1,464,390 | ▼1.3 | 475,176 | ▼1.2 |
| 2013 | 72,367,054 | ▲3.3 | 1,422,939 | ▼2.8 | 471,936 | ▼0.7 |
| 2014 | 73,374,825 | ▲1.4 | 1,498,906 | ▲5.3 | 472,802 | ▲0.2 |
| 2015 | 74,959,058 | ▲2.2 | 1,496,551 | ▼0.2 | 473,087 | ▲2.7 |
| 2016 | 75,676,223 | ▲1.0 | 1,541,029 | ▲3.0 | 473,231 | ▲0.2 |
| 2017 | 77,988,752 | ▲3.1 | 1,698,455 | ▲9.3 | 474,033 | ▲0.6 |
| 2018 | 80,102,017 | ▲2.7 | 1,788,815 | ▲5.3 | 477,604 | ▲1.0 |
| 2019 | 80,884,310 | ▲0.9 | 1,587,451 | ▼11.2 | 475,861 | ▼0.3 |
| 2020 | 22,109,723 | ▼72.7 | 1,150,030 | ▼28.0 | 200,905 | ▼57.8 |
| 2021 | 19,393,145 | ▼12.3 | 1,402,913 | ▲22.0 | 190,032 | ▼5.4 |
| 2022 | 61,611,838 | ▲217.6 | 1,350,878 | ▼3.7 | 384,383 | ▲98.7 |
| 2023 | 79,151,723 | ▲28.5 | 1,387,060 | ▲2.7 | 454,089 | ▲18.1 |
| 2024 | 83,859,729 | ▲5.3 | 1,536,384 | ▲9.2 | 473,965 | ▲3.9 |

=== Busiest routes ===
Busiest international routes from Heathrow (2025)
| Rank | Destination | Passengers | Change 2024 / 25 |
|---|---|---|---|
| 1 | New York–JFK, United States | 3,220,238 | ▼0.6% |
| 2 | Dubai, United Arab Emirates | 2,539,936 | ▼1.0% |
| 3 | Doha, Qatar | 2,150,321 | ▲7.2% |
| 4 | Dublin, Ireland | 1,823,638 | ▼4.1% |
| 5 | New Delhi, India | 1,525,729 | ▲6.1% |
| 6 | Madrid, Spain | 1,501,118 | ▼3.1% |
| 7 | Amsterdam, Netherlands | 1,469,288 | ▲0.6% |
| 8 | Los Angeles, United States | 1,459,443 | ▼13.1% |
| 9 | Singapore–Changi, Singapore | 1,411,442 | ▼6.6% |
| 10 | Frankfurt, Germany | 1,379,388 | ▼2.7% |
| 11 | Munich, Germany | 1,305,493 | ▼0.3% |
| 12 | Istanbul, Turkey | 1,292,819 | ▼0.1% |
| 13 | Mumbai, India | 1,240,364 | ▲9.7% |
| 14 | Toronto, Canada | 1,214,726 | ▲3.5% |
| 15 | Hong Kong | 1,212,725 | ▲2.8% |
| 16 | Paris, France | 1,163,733 | ▲3.2% |
| 17 | Abu Dhabi, United Arab Emirates | 1,147,835 | ▼0.9% |
| 18 | Zurich, Switzerland | 1,140,592 | ▼1.3% |
| 19 | Lisbon, Portugal | 1,125,791 | ▲0.4% |
| 20 | Boston, United States | 1,105,185 | ▲3.2% |
Source: CAA Statistics

Busiest domestic routes from Heathrow (2025)
| Rank | Destination | Passengers | Change 2024–25 |
|---|---|---|---|
| 1 | Edinburgh | 1,089,587 | ▼6.1% |
| 2 | Glasgow | 959,919 | ▲0.7% |
| 3 | Belfast-City | 611,634 | ▲4.5% |
| 4 | Manchester | 606,085 | ▼3.7% |
| 5 | Aberdeen | 555,033 | ▼2.5% |
| 6 | Newcastle upon Tyne | 479,742 | ▼3.6% |
| 7 | Jersey | 284,682 | ▼15.0% |
| 8 | Inverness | 175,605 | ▲9.6% |
| 9 | Derry | 77,721 | ▲4.3% |
| 10 | Isle of Man | 29,590 | ▼12.4% |
Source: CAA Statistics

== Other facilities ==
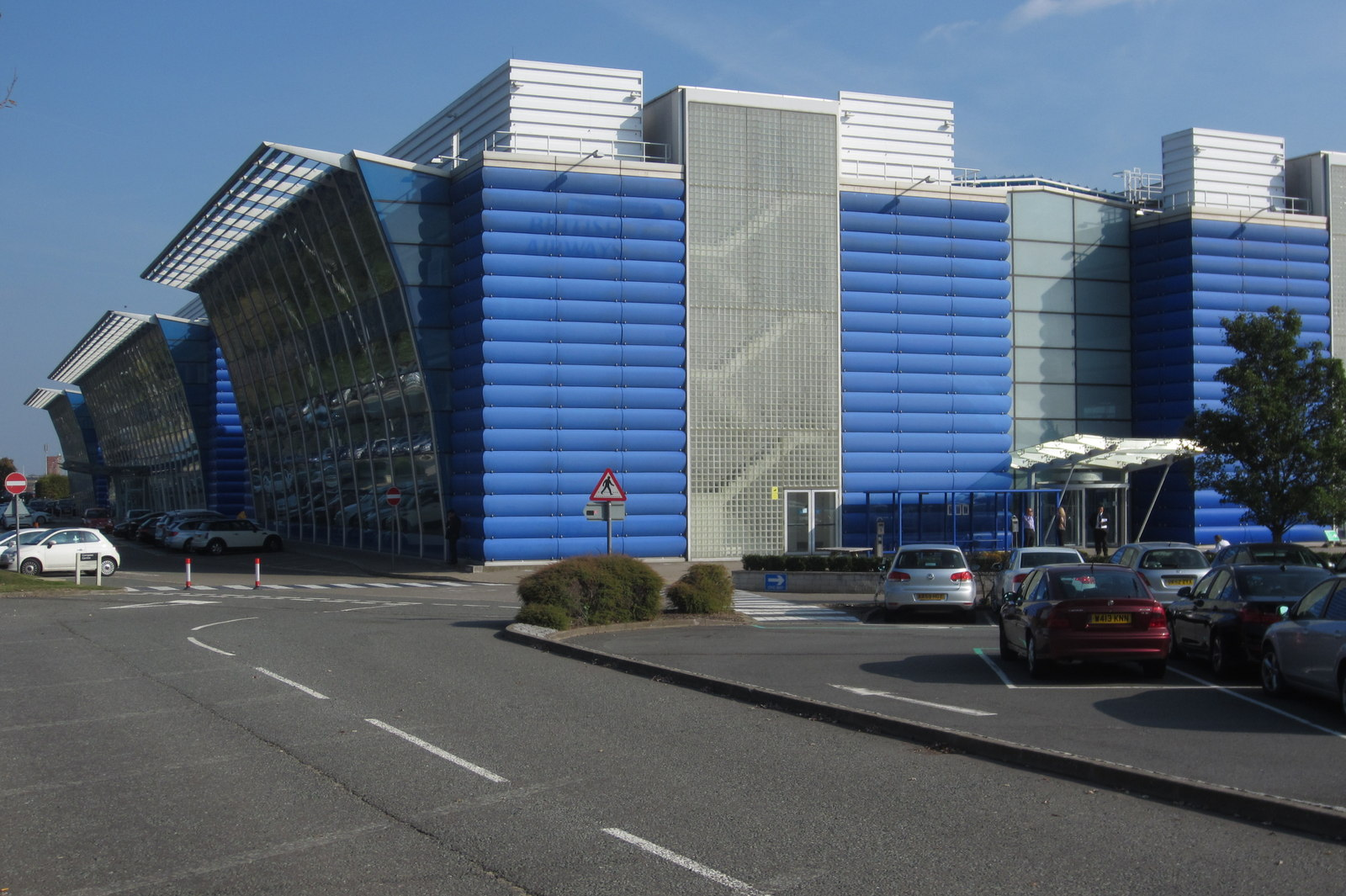
The Compass Centre, the head office of Heathrow Airport Holdings

The head office of Heathrow Airport Holdings (formerly BAA Limited) is located in the Compass Centre by Heathrow's northern runway, a building that previously served as a British Airways flight crew centre. The World Business Centre Heathrow consists of three buildings. 1 World Business Centre houses offices of Heathrow Airport Holdings, Heathrow Airport itself, and Scandinavian Airlines. Previously International Airlines Group had its head office in 2 World Business Centre.

At one time, the British Airways head office was located within Heathrow Airport at Speedbird House before the completion of Waterside, the current BA head office in Harmondsworth, in June 1998.

To the north of the airfield lies the Northern Perimeter Road, along which most of Heathrow's car rental agencies are based, and Bath Road, which runs parallel to it, but outside the airport campus.

== Ground transport ==
=== Public transport ===
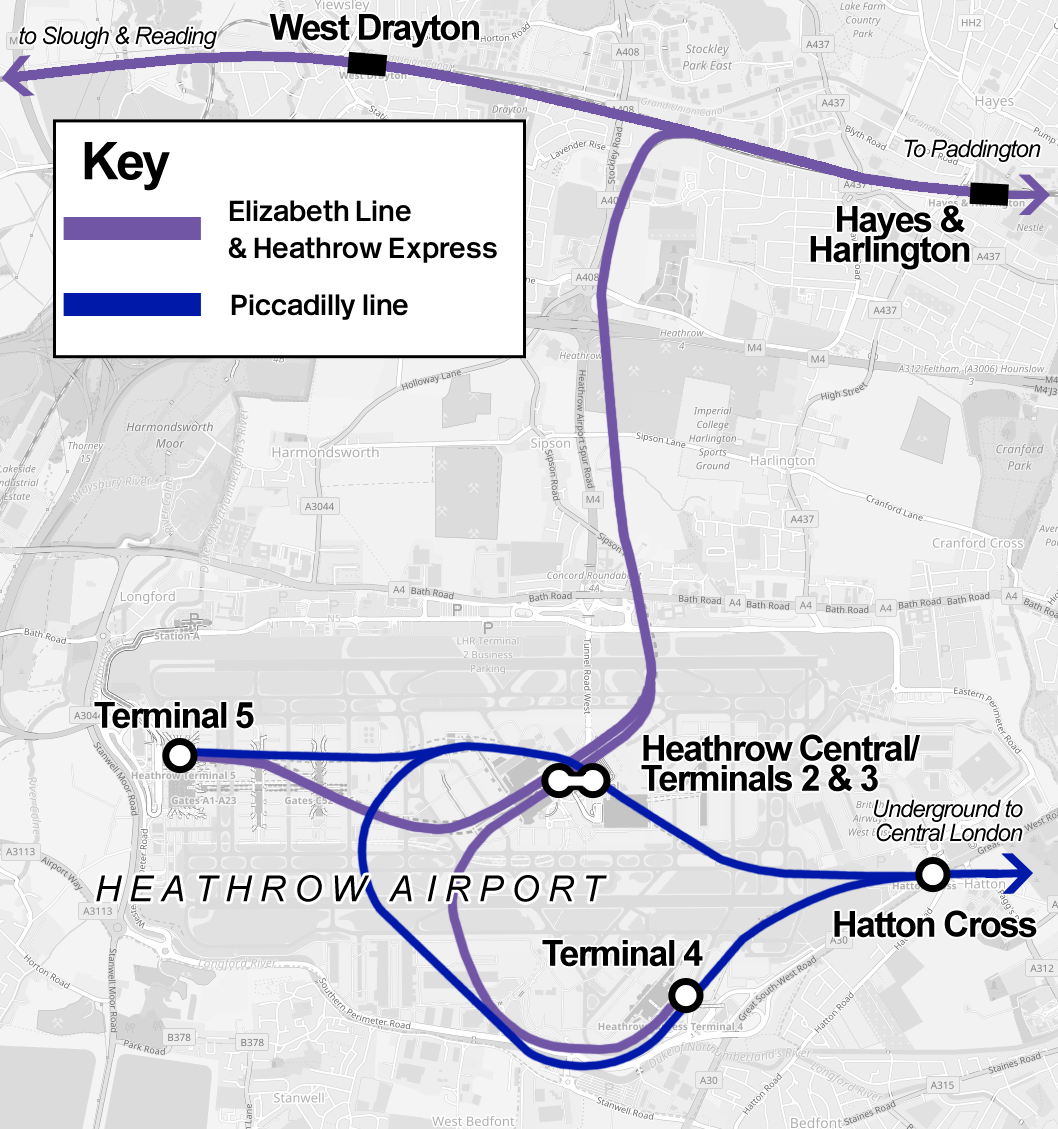
Heathrow Airport tube and rail stations

==== Train ====
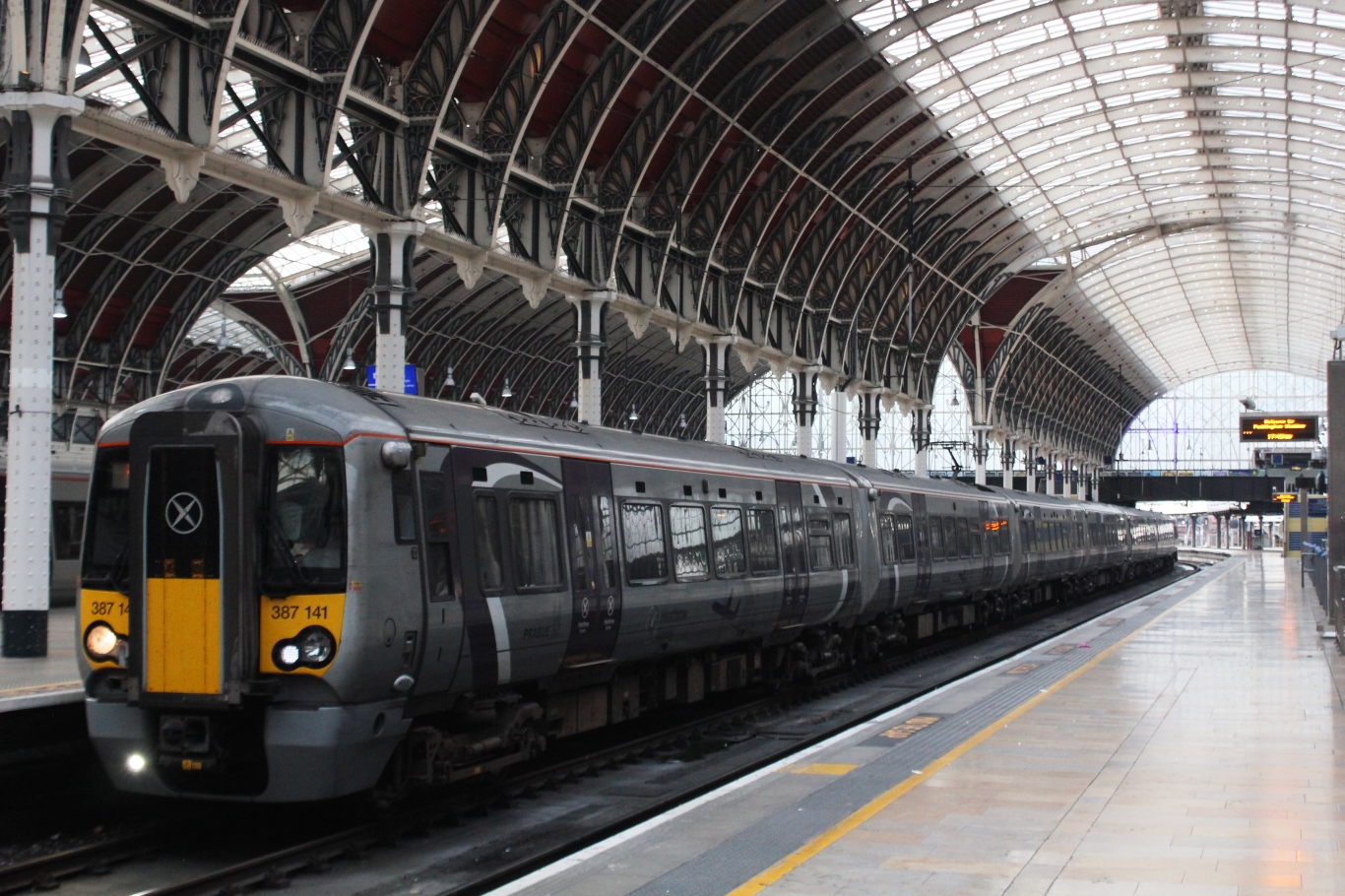
Heathrow Express Class 387 at London Paddington

There are three train services to Central London:

- Heathrow Express: a non-stop service direct to London Paddington; trains leave every 15 minutes for the 15-minute journey (21 minutes to and from Terminal 5). Trains depart from Heathrow Terminal 5 station or Heathrow Central station (Terminals 2 & 3). There is a free transfer service between Terminal 4 and Heathrow Central to connect with services from London and Terminal 5.
- Elizabeth line: a stopping service to Abbey Wood and Shenfield via Paddington and central London – six trains per hour, two originating from Terminal 5 and four originating from Terminal 4. Calls at Hayes & Harlington for connecting trains to Reading. Scheduled journey time into Central London is around 35 minutes.
- London Underground (Piccadilly line): four stations serve the airport: Terminal 2 & 3, Terminal 4 and Terminal 5 serve the passenger terminals; Hatton Cross serves the maintenance areas. The usual journey time from Heathrow Central to Central London is around 40–50 minutes.

==== Bus and coach ====
Many bus and coach services operate from Heathrow Central bus station, which serves Terminal 2 and Terminal 3. Services also operate from the bus stations located at Terminal 4 and Terminal 5.

=== Inter-terminal transport ===
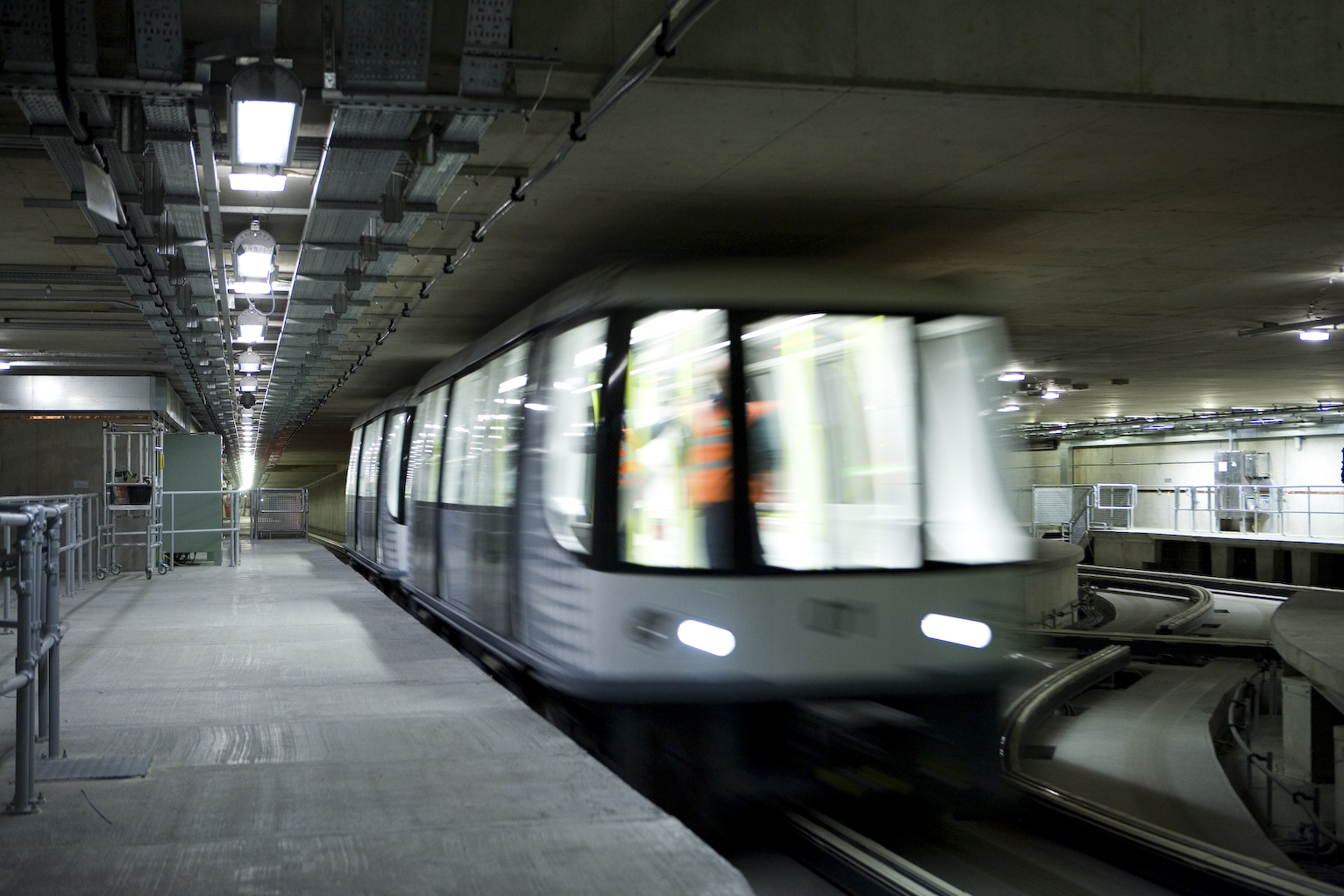
Terminal 5 airside transit system

Terminals 2 and 3 are within walking distance of each other. Transfers from Terminals 2 and 3 to Terminals 4 and 5 are provided by Elizabeth line and Heathrow Express trains and the London Underground Piccadilly line. Direct transfer between Terminals 4 and 5 is provided for free by route H30, introduced by Diamond Buses on 1 December 2022.

Transit passengers remaining airside are provided with free dedicated transfer buses between terminals. These use dedicated airside tunnels (Heathrow Cargo Tunnel between Terminals 2/3 and 4, Heathrow Airside Road Tunnel between Terminals 2/3 and 5) to minimise disruption to aircraft operations.

The Heathrow Pod personal rapid transit system shuttles passengers between Terminal 5 and the business car park using 21 small, driverless transportation pods. The pods are battery-powered and run on-demand on a 4 km (2.5-mile) track, each able to carry up to four adults, two children, and their luggage. Plans exist to extend the Pod system to connect Terminals 2 and 3 to remote car parks.

An underground automated people mover system known as the Transit operates within Terminal 5, linking the main terminal with the satellite Terminals 5B and 5C. The Transit operates entirely airside using Bombardier Innovia APM 200 people mover vehicles.

=== Hotel access ===
Some hotels are directly connected to the terminals and therefore are walkable without any transfers. Many more hotels are easily accessible using the local buses, which depart from all terminals.

The Hotel Hoppa bus network also connects all terminals to major hotels in the area.

=== Taxi ===
Taxis are available at all terminals.

=== Car ===
Heathrow is accessible via the nearby M4 motorway or A4 road (Terminals 2–3), the M25 motorway (Terminals 4 and 5), and the A30 road (Terminal 4). There are drop-off and pick-up areas at all terminals and short- and long-stay multi-storey car parks. All the Heathrow forecourts are drop-off only. There are further car parks, not run by Heathrow Airport Holdings, just outside the airport: the most recognisable is the National Car Parks facility, although there are many other options; these car parks are connected to the terminals by shuttle buses.

=== Bicycle ===
There are (mainly off-road) bicycle routes to some of the terminals. Free bicycle parking places are available in car parks 1 and 1A, at Terminal 4, and to the north and south of Terminal 5's Interchange Plaza. Cycling is not currently allowed through the main tunnel to access the central area and Terminals 2 and 3.

== Accidents and incidents ==
- On 3 March 1948, a Sabena Douglas DC-3 (registration: OO-AWH) crashed in fog. Three crew members and 19 of the 22 passengers on board died.
- On 31 October 1950, a BEA Vickers Viking (registration: G-AHPN) crashed at Heathrow after hitting the runway during a go-around. Three crew members and 25 passengers died.
- On 16 January 1955, a BEA Vickers Viscount (registered as G-AMOK) crashed into barriers whilst taking off in the fog from a disused runway strip parallel to the desired runway. There were two injuries.
- On 22 June 1955, a BOAC de Havilland Dove (registration: G-ALTM) crashed just short of the runway during a filming flight when the pilot shut down the incorrect engine. There were no casualties.
- On 1 October 1956, XA897, an Avro Vulcan strategic bomber of the Royal Air Force, crashed at Heathrow after an approach in bad weather. The Vulcan was the first to be delivered to the RAF and was returning from a demonstration flight to Australia and New Zealand. The pilot and co-pilot ejected and survived, but the four other occupants were killed.
- On 7 January 1960, a Vickers Viscount (registration: G-AOHU) of BEA was damaged beyond economic repair when the nose wheel collapsed on landing. A fire then developed and burnt out the fuselage. There were no casualties among the 59 people on board.
- On 27 October 1965, a BEA Vickers Vanguard (registration: G-APEE), flying from Edinburgh, crashed on Runway 28R while attempting to land in poor visibility. All 30 passengers and six crew on board died.
- On 8 April 1968, BOAC Flight 712,a Boeing 707 (registration: G-ARWE), departing for Australia via Singapore, suffered an engine fire just after take-off. The engine fell from the wing into a nearby gravel pit in Staines, before the plane managed to perform an emergency landing with the wing on fire. However, the plane was consumed by fire once on the ground. Five people – four passengers and a flight attendant – died, while 122 survived. The flight attendant, Barbara Harrison, who helped with the evacuation, was posthumously awarded the George Cross.
- On 3 July 1968, the port flap operating rod of G-AMAD, an Airspeed Ambassador operated by BKS Air Transport, failed due to fatigue, thereby allowing the port flaps to retract. This resulted in a rolling movement to the port, which could not be controlled during the approach, causing the aircraft to contact the grass and swerve towards the terminal building. It hit two parked British European Airways Hawker Siddeley Trident aircraft, burst into flames, and came to rest against the ground floor of the terminal building. Six of the eight crew died, as did eight horses on board. Trident G-ARPT was written off, and Trident G-ARPI was badly damaged, but subsequently repaired, only to be lost in the Staines crash in 1972.
- On 18 June 1972, Trident G-ARPI, operating as BEA548, crashed in a field close to the Crooked Billet Public House, Staines, two minutes after taking off. All 118 passengers and crew on board died.
- On 5 November 1997, the pilots of Virgin Atlantic Flight 024, Airbus A340-311 (registration: G-VSKY), performed an intentional belly landing on runway 27L after the left main landing gear jammed in a partially lowered position. Two crew members and five passengers suffered minor injuries in the emergency evacuation. Investigators found that a brake torque pin had fallen out of the landing gear on takeoff from Los Angeles International Airport (LAX) because the pin and its retaining assembly were subject to higher than predicted loads while in service; the precise mode of failure could not be verified because only the pin, and not its retaining hardware, was found at LAX. The aircraft sustained substantial damage but was repaired and placed back in service.
- On 1 December 2003, two aircraft carrying a total of 500 passengers flew within 600 feet (180 m) of vertical clearance while waiting to land in a holding pattern near the airport. A later inquiry found an air traffic controller had wrongly directed a United Airlines Boeing 777 to descend to a level of the arrival stack that was already occupied by a British Airways aircraft.
- On 17 January 2008, a British Airways Boeing 777-236ER, (registration: G-YMMM), operating flight BA038 from Beijing, crash-landed short of runway 27L and stopped on the threshold, leading to 18 minor injuries. The impact tore off the right landing gear and pushed the left landing gear through the wing root; the aircraft was subsequently written off. The accident was attributed to a loss of thrust caused by fuel icing.
- On 28 September 2022, a Korean Air Boeing 777 preparing to take off collided with an Icelandair Boeing 757 which had just landed. The 777 crew aborted the takeoff; no injuries were reported, but the aircraft suffered minor damage.
- On 6 April 2024, the wing of an empty Virgin Atlantic Boeing 787 under tow at Terminal 3 clipped a parked British Airways plane preparing to depart from an adjacent gate with 121 passengers on board. The passengers transferred to a different British Airways aircraft and departed several hours later. Heathrow said there were no injuries, but both aircraft sustained damage.
- On 21 March 2025, Heathrow Airport was closed due to a fire at a nearby electrical substation. The fire caused a power outage at the airport, leading to the decision to close all terminals until midnight on that day. More than 1,000 flights were cancelled. The owner of British Airways (International Airlines Group) estimated that the outage cost them £40 million.

=== Terrorism and security incidents ===
- On 8 June 1968, James Earl Ray, the suspect in the 4 April 1968 assassination of Martin Luther King Jr., was captured, arrested, and extradited back to the United States at Heathrow Airport while attempting to leave the United Kingdom for Rhodesia (now Zimbabwe) on a false Canadian passport.
- On 6 September 1970, El Al Flight 219 experienced an attempted hijack by two PFLP members. One hijacker was killed, and the other was subdued as the plane made an emergency landing at Heathrow Airport.
- On 19 May 1974, the IRA planted a series of bombs in the Terminal 1 car park. Two people were injured by the explosions.
- On 26 November 1983, the Brink's-Mat robbery occurred, in which 6,800 gold bars worth nearly £26 million were taken from a vault near Heathrow. Only a small amount of the gold was recovered, and only two men were convicted of the crime.
- On 17 April 1986, semtex explosives were found in the bag of a pregnant Irish woman attempting to board an El Al flight. The explosives had been given to her by her Jordanian boyfriend and the father of her unborn child Nizar Hindawi. The incident became known as the Hindawi Affair.
- On 21 December 1988, Pan Am Flight 103 exploded mid-air over the town of Lockerbie, killing all 259 onboard and eleven people on the ground. The flight originated from Frankfurt as a feeder flight with a change of aircraft at Heathrow and was on its transatlantic leg to New York's JFK airport at the time of the incident. An unaccompanied suitcase containing a boombox radio/cassette player, which housed the explosive, was checked in at Malta and forwarded as interline baggage for this flight at Frankfurt, wherein it made its way to the transatlantic leg.
- In 1994, over six days, Heathrow was targeted three times (8, 10, and 13 March) by the IRA, which fired 12 mortars. Heathrow was a symbolic target due to its importance to the UK economy, and much disruption was caused when areas of the airport were closed over the period. The gravity of the incident was heightened because the Queen was being flown back to Heathrow by the RAF on 10 March.
- In March 2002, thieves stole US$3 million that had arrived on a South African Airways flight. Just a few weeks earlier, a similar amount of money was stolen from a British Airways flight that arrived from Bahrain.
- In February 2003, the British Army was deployed to Heathrow along with 1,000 police officers in response to intelligence reports suggesting that al-Qaeda terrorists might launch surface-to-air missile attacks at British or American airliners.
- On 17 May 2004, Scotland Yard's Flying Squad foiled an attempt by seven men to steal £40 million in gold bullion and a similar quantity of cash from the Swissport warehouse at Heathrow.
- On 25 February 2008, Greenpeace activists protesting against the planned construction of a third runway managed to cross the ramp and climb atop a British Airways Airbus A320, which had just arrived from Manchester Airport. At about 09:45 GMT, the protesters unveiled a "Climate Emergency – No Third Runway" banner over the aircraft's tailfin. By 11:00 GMT, four arrests had been made.
- In October 2010, an Angolan national was being deported on a British Airways plane. Security guards were heavy-handed with him, and they put him in a dangerous position, leading to asphyxia. He did not survive.
- On 13 July 2015, thirteen activists belonging to the climate change protest group Plane Stupid managed to break through the perimeter fence and get onto the northern runway. They chained themselves together in protest, disrupting hundreds of flights. All were eventually arrested.
- In June 2022, many protesters gathered at Heathrow and Gatwick airports to protest the UK-Rwanda deal. A flight which was supposed to carry asylum seekers from the UK to Rwanda was cancelled.
- In December 2022, a piece of uranium metal discovered in the airport triggered a counter-terrorism investigation. It was found in a scrap metal package originally from Pakistan that arrived via a passenger flight from Oman on 29 December. It was bound for an Iranian business with premises in the UK.

=== Other incidents ===
- On 18 December 2010, snowfall (9 cm or 3.5 inches, according to the Heathrow Winter Resilience Enquiry) caused the closure of the entire airport, causing one of the largest incidents at Heathrow of all time. Some 4,000 flights were cancelled over five days and 9,500 passengers spent the night at Heathrow on 18 December following the initial snowfall. The problems were caused not only by snow on the runways but also by snow and ice on the 198 parking stands which were all occupied by aircraft.
- On 12 July 2013, the emergency locator transmitter (ELT) on an Ethiopian Airlines Boeing 787 Dreamliner parked at Heathrow airport caught fire due to a short circuit. There were no passengers aboard and no injuries.
- From 12 September 2019, the climate change campaign group, Heathrow Pause, attempted to disrupt flights into and out of Heathrow Airport in London by flying drones in the airport's exclusion zone. The action was unsuccessful in disrupting the flights and nineteen people were arrested.

== Future expansion and plans ==
=== Third runway and terminal expansion ===
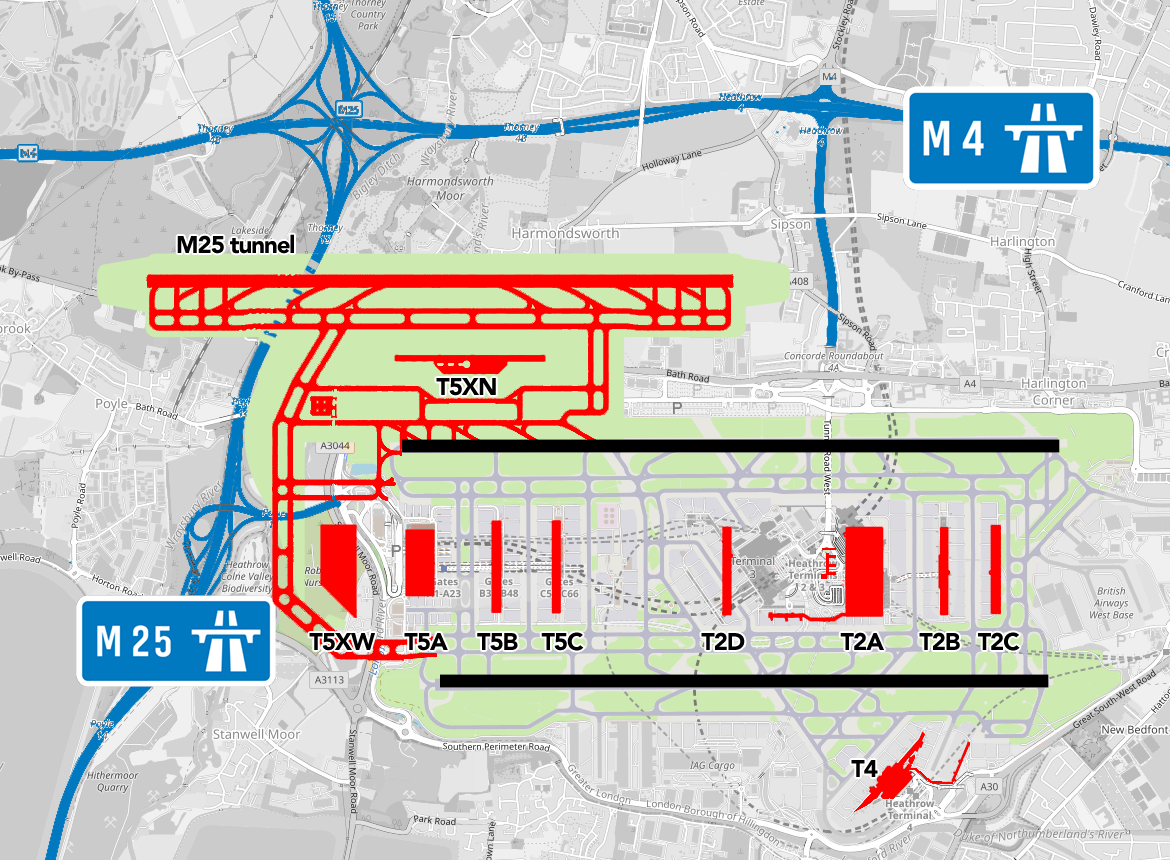
Heathrow airport roads and terminals expansion layout

There is a long history of expansion proposals for Heathrow since it was first designated as a civil airport. Following the cancellation of the Maplin project in 1974, a fourth terminal was proposed, but expansion beyond this was ruled out. However, the Airports Inquiries of 1981–83 and the 1985 Airports Policy White Paper considered further expansion and, following a four-year-long public inquiry in 1995–99, Terminal 5 was approved. In 2003, after many studies and consultations, the Future of Air Transport White Paper was published, which proposed a third runway at Heathrow, as well as a second runway at Stansted Airport. In January 2009, the Transport Secretary at the time, Geoff Hoon announced that the British government supported the expansion of Heathrow by building a third 2,200-metre (7,200 ft) runway and a sixth terminal building. This decision followed the 2003 white paper on the future of air transport in the UK, and a public consultation in November 2007. This was a controversial decision which met with widespread opposition because of the expected greenhouse gas emissions, impact on local communities, as well as noise and air pollution concerns.

Before the 2010 general election, the Conservative and Liberal Democrat parties announced that they would prevent the construction of any third runway or further material expansion of the airport's operating capacity. The Mayor of London, then Boris Johnson, took the position that London needs more airport capacity, favouring the construction of an entirely new airport in the Thames Estuary rather than expanding Heathrow. After the Conservative-Liberal Democrat coalition took power, it was announced that the third runway expansion was cancelled. Two years later, leading Conservatives were reported to have changed their minds on the subject.

Another proposal for expanding Heathrow's capacity was the Heathrow Hub, which aims to extend both runways to a total length of about 7,000 metres and divide them into four so that they each provide two, full-length runways, allowing simultaneous take-offs and landings while decreasing noise levels.

In July 2013, the airport submitted three new proposals for expansion to the Airports Commission, which was established to review airport capacity in the southeast of England. The Airports Commission was chaired by Sir Howard Davies. He, at the time of his appointment, was in the employ of GIC Private Limited (formerly known as Government Investment Corporation of Singapore) and a member of its International Advisory Board. GIC Private Limited was then (2012), as it remains today, one of Heathrow's principal owners. Sir Howard Davies resigned from these positions upon confirmation of his appointment to lead the Airports Commission, although it has been observed that he failed to identify these interests when invited to complete the Airports Commission's register of interests. Each of the three proposals that were to be considered by Sir Howard Davies's commission involved the construction of a third runway, either to the north, northwest, or southwest of the airport.

The commission released its interim report in December 2013, shortlisting three options: the north-west third runway option at Heathrow, extending an existing runway at Heathrow, and a second runway at Gatwick Airport. After this report was published, the government confirmed that no options had been ruled out for airport expansion in the South-east and that a new runway would not be built at Heathrow before 2015. The full report was published on 1 July 2015, and backed a third, north-west, runway at Heathrow. Reaction to the report was generally adverse, particularly from London Mayor Boris Johnson. One senior Conservative told Channel 4: "Howard Davies has dumped an utter steaming pile of poo on the Prime Minister's desk." On 25 October 2016, the government confirmed that Heathrow would be allowed to build a third runway; however, a final decision would not be taken until winter of 2017/18, after consultations and government votes. The earliest opening year would be 2025.

On 5 June 2018, the UK Cabinet approved the third runway, with a full vote planned for Parliament. On 25 June 2018, the House of Commons voted, 415–119, in favour of the third runway. The bill received support from most MPs in the Conservative and Labour parties. A judicial review against the decision was launched by four London local authorities affected by the expansion—Wandsworth, Richmond, Hillingdon and Hammersmith and Fulham—in partnership with Greenpeace and London mayor Sadiq Khan. Khan previously stated he would take legal action if it were passed by Parliament.

In February 2020, the Court of Appeal ruled that the plans for a third runway were illegal since they did not adequately take into account the government's commitments to the Paris climate agreement. However, this ruling was later overturned by the Supreme Court in December 2020. The plan stalled after a fall in passenger numbers during the COVID pandemic and concerns about investment costs, but came back into the spotlight after the Labour Party won the 2024 UK general election. The airport's CEO indicated in November 2024 that he would seek a "final" decision from the government by the end of 2025.

=== New transport proposals ===
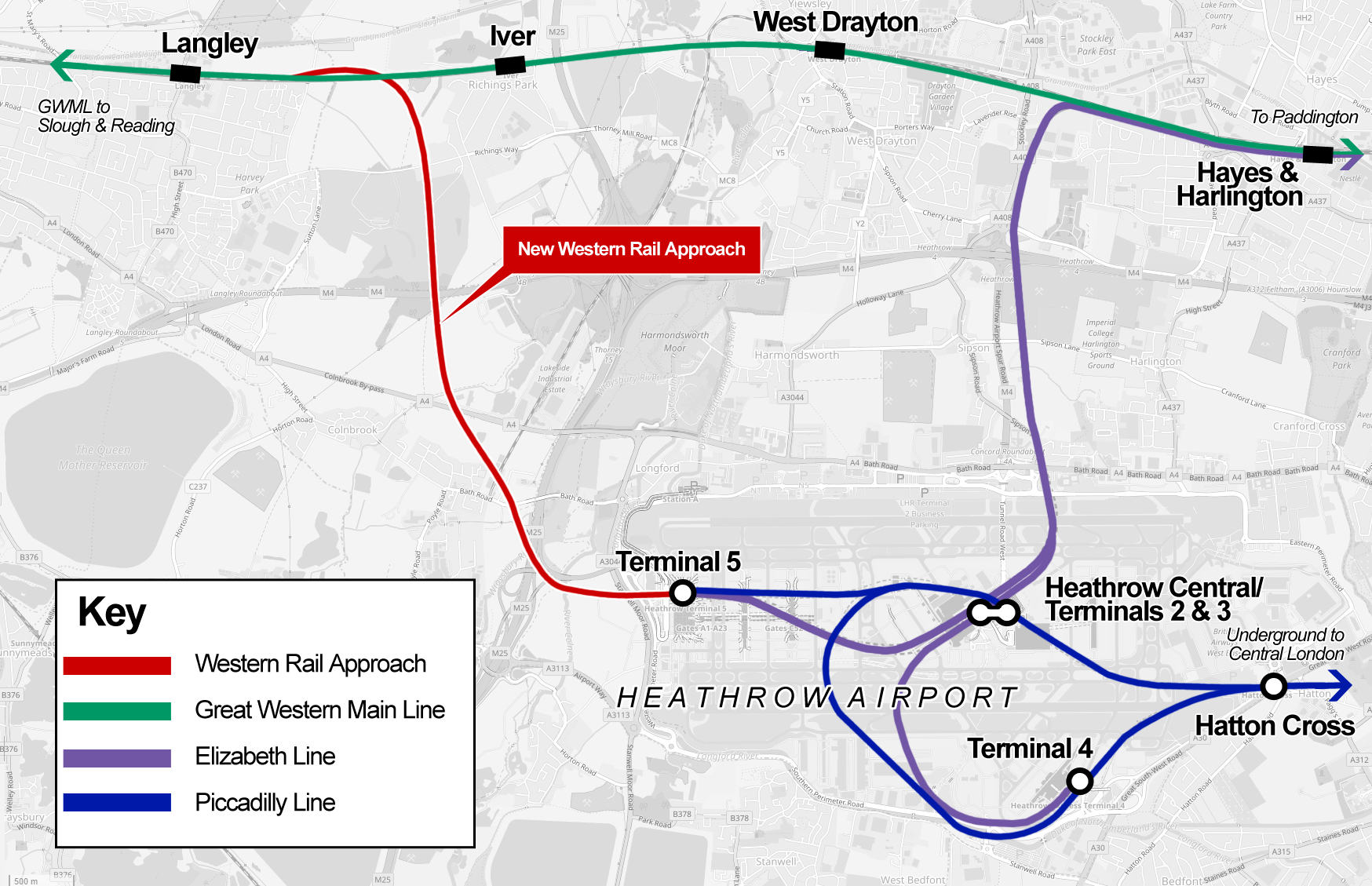
One of the transport projects being considered is the Western Rail Approach to Heathrow.

Currently, all rail connections with Heathrow Airport run along an east–west alignment to and from central London, and a number of schemes have been proposed over the years to develop new rail transport links with other parts of London and with stations outside the city. This mainline rail service has been extended with the opening of the Elizabeth Line.

A 2009 proposal to create a southern link with London Waterloo via the Waterloo–Reading line was abandoned in 2011 due to lack of funding and difficulties with a high number of level crossings on the route into London, and a plan to link Heathrow to the planned High Speed 2 (HS2) railway line (with a new station, Heathrow Hub) was also dropped from the HS2 plans in March 2015.

Among other schemes that have been considered is a rapid transport link between Heathrow and Gatwick Airports, known as Heathwick, which would allow the airports to operate jointly as an airline hub; In 2018, the Department for Transport began to invite proposals for privately funded rail links to Heathrow Airport. Projects being considered under this initiative include:

- the Western Rail Approach to Heathrow, a proposal for a spur from the Great Western Main Line to link Heathrow to Reading, Slough, the South West, South Wales and the West Midlands.
- Heathrow Southern Railway, a similar scheme to the abandoned Airtrack proposal, which would connect Terminal 5 station with Chertsey or Virginia Water, Staines, London Waterloo, Guildford and Clapham Junction.

== See also ==
- Airports of London
- Heathrow Worldwide Distribution Centre
- NATS Swanwick
- List of airports in the United Kingdom and the British Crown Dependencies
