= Cranford Agreement =

The Cranford Protocol or Cranford Agreement was an oral undertaking given in 1952 by the British Government to the residents of Cranford in London regarding the usage of the runways at London Heathrow Airport to reduce the impact of aircraft noise on local residents.

Under normal operations the agreement prohibited take-off on the northern runway towards the east (over London) because of the proximity of Cranford to the east end of this runway; however this runway could be used in exceptional cases, for example when the southern runway was not available for departures or when departure delays are excessive.

Although no formal written agreement exists, the Government acknowledges that an oral undertaking was given by a senior government official at a meeting of the Cranford Residents' and District Amenities Association on 31 July 1952. The protocol is included in the Heathrow Manual of Air Traffic Services and the airport's noise abatement notification, and thus is a part of the airport's operating rules.

On 15 January 2009, the Labour Government announced that it was ending the Cranford Agreement as part of the controversial expansion of London Heathrow Airport. Although in May 2010 the Coalition Government cancelled the Heathrow expansion plans, in September 2010 it reaffirmed the decision to end the Cranford Agreement. This decision was welcomed by the Royal Borough of Windsor and Maidenhead, to the west. To the east, the London Borough of Hounslow called for mitigation or compensation to be offered by BAA to those affected by ending the Cranford Agreement.

In May 2013 Heathrow Airport Holdings (who own and operate the airport) submitted planning permission to the London Borough of Hillingdon to build new access taxiways, which would allow the implementation of full runway alternation on easterly operations. This permission was rejected in March 2014; Heathrow Airport appealed with a planning enquiry in June 2015. On 2 February 2017 the Planning Inspectorate recommended that the appeal be allowed and planning permission granted. The decision has not yet been implemented as the airport is considering the Government's airspace management proposals for London and their own plans for expansion.
