= Heathrow Airside Road Tunnel =

Tunnel at London Heathrow Airport

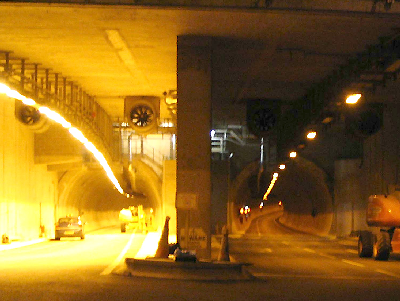
View into the twin bores at the west end of the ART

The Heathrow Airside Road Tunnel (ART) is a tunnel at Heathrow Airport. It connects the airside roads around Terminals 1, 2 and 3 to those around Terminal 5. The tunnel was opened to traffic in March 2005 and is used only by vehicles with security clearance to drive airside.

The ART is 1.42 kilometres (0.88 mi) long, consisting of 60 metres (200 ft) of twin-cell cut and cover box at each end, linked by a pair of 1.3-kilometre (0.81 mi) long bored tunnels. The ART was designed and built between 1999 and 2004 by a team of engineers from the BAA (the tunnel's owner), Amec, Laing O'Rourke, Morgan Est-Vinci and Mott MacDonald.

The bored tunnels have internal diameter of 8.1 metres (27 ft) and were driven by a 9.16-metre (30 ft 1 in) diameter Herrenknecht earth pressure balance tunnel boring machine. The excavations were lined with a bolted concrete lining 0.45 metres (1 ft 6 in) thick: these are unusually strong tunnel segments, required because the ART is so close to the surface and, at one point, passes 3 metres (9 ft 10 in) over the top of the Heathrow Express tunnel to Terminal 4.

Each bore contains an unusual road layout, consisting of a single carriageway 6 metres (20 ft) wide; just wide enough to allow an airport bus (Cobus 2700) to drive past another bus stopped at the side of the road. The two tunnels are linked by escape cross-passages at intervals of 100 to 130 metres (330–430 ft).

== Portals ==
- West portal: 51.46834°N 0.49059°W
- East portal: 51.46954°N 0.45507°W

== Sources ==
- Challenging ART for Heathrow, World Tunnelling August 2003, pp. 225–229
- Darby, A., The Airside Road Tunnel, Heathrow Airport, England, Proceedings of the Rapid Excavation & Tunneling Conference, New Orleans, June 2003, pp. 638–647
- Morgan Est project page on T5
