= Cruise ship =

Passenger ship used for pleasure voyages

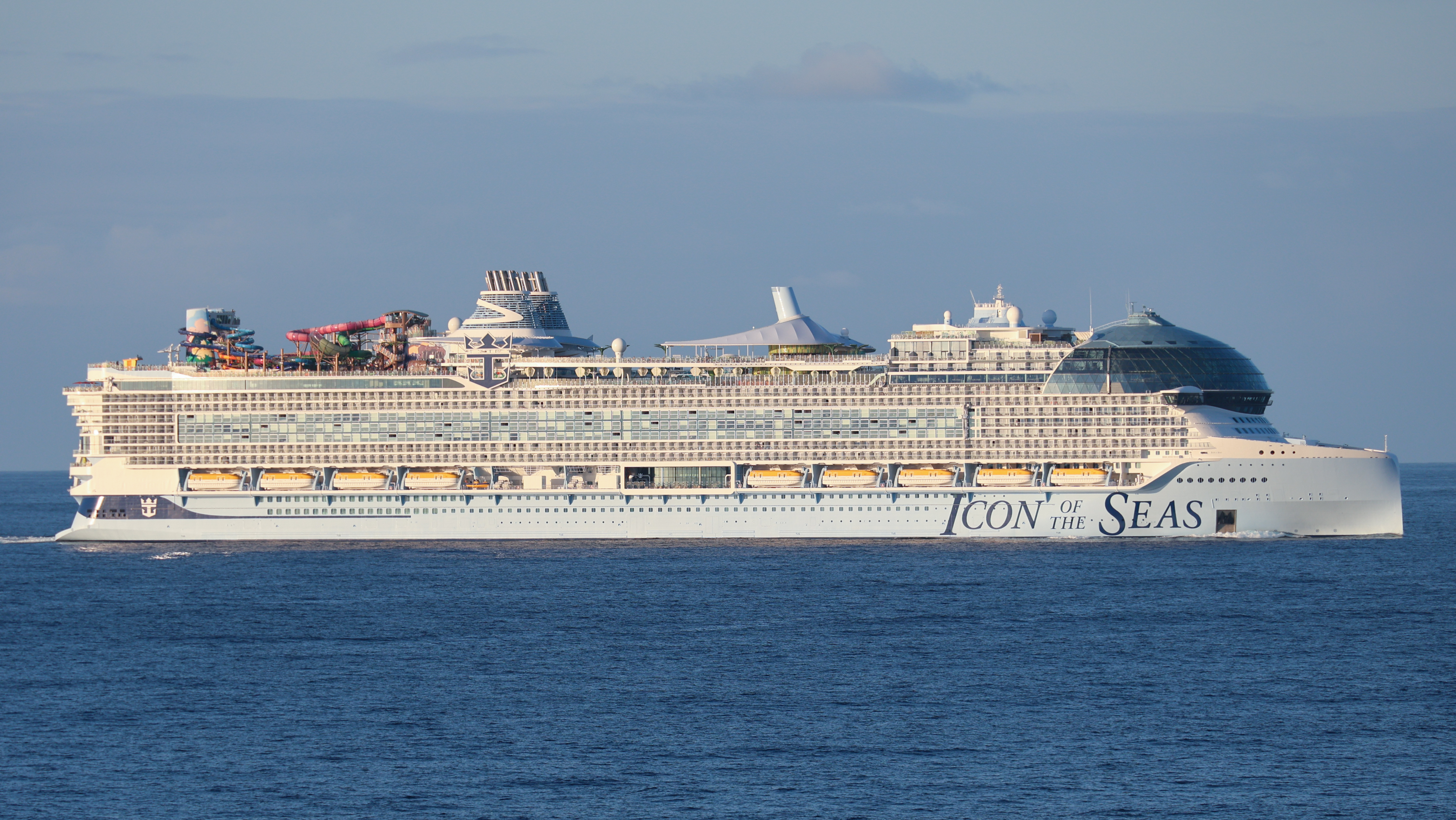
- Icon of the Seas, one of the largest cruise ships in service with a maximum capacity of 7,600 passengers
- Industry: vacations
- Fuel source: Typically heavy fuel oil

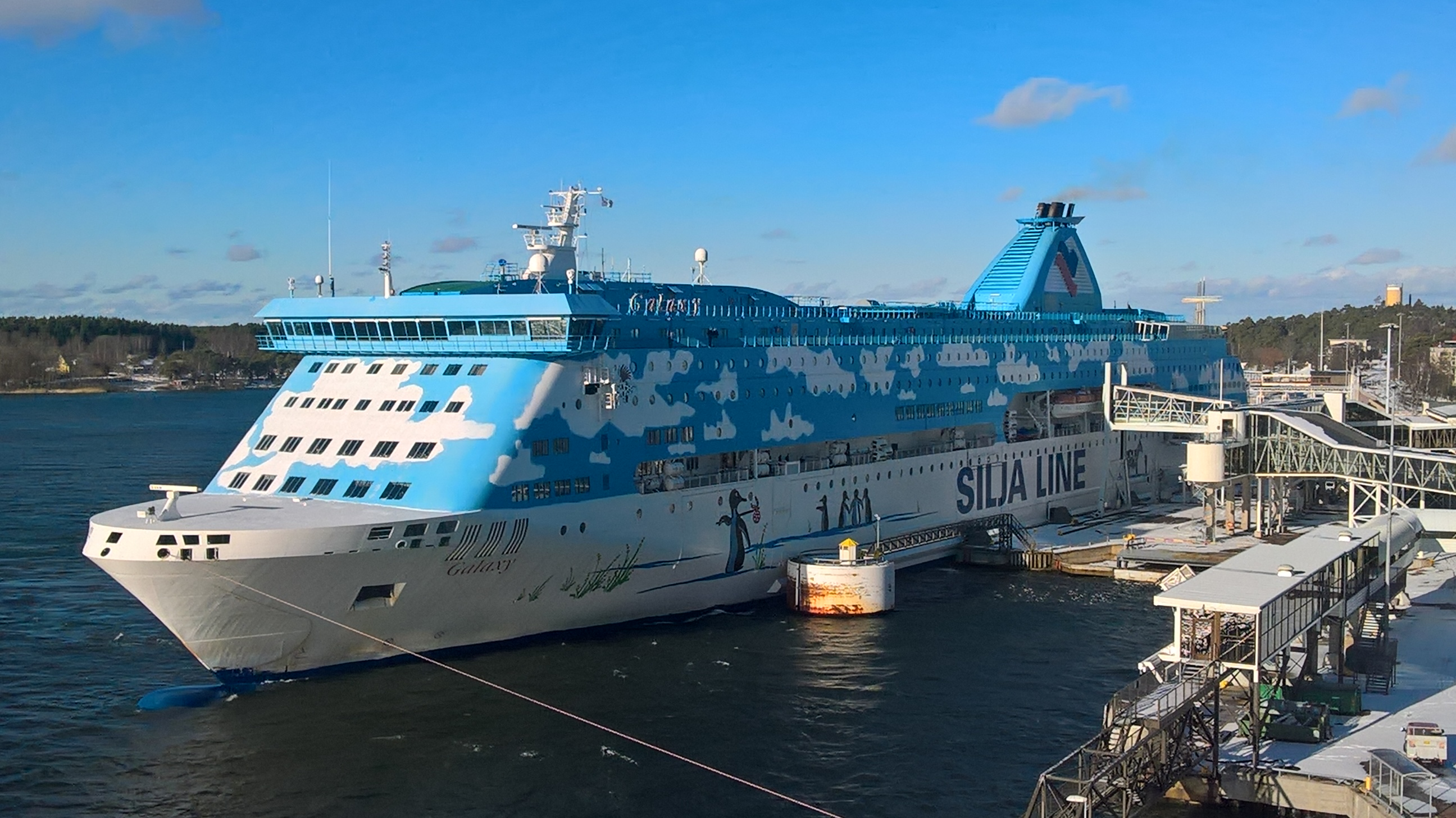
Cruiseferry MS Galaxy at the port of Mariehamn, Åland, in February 2016

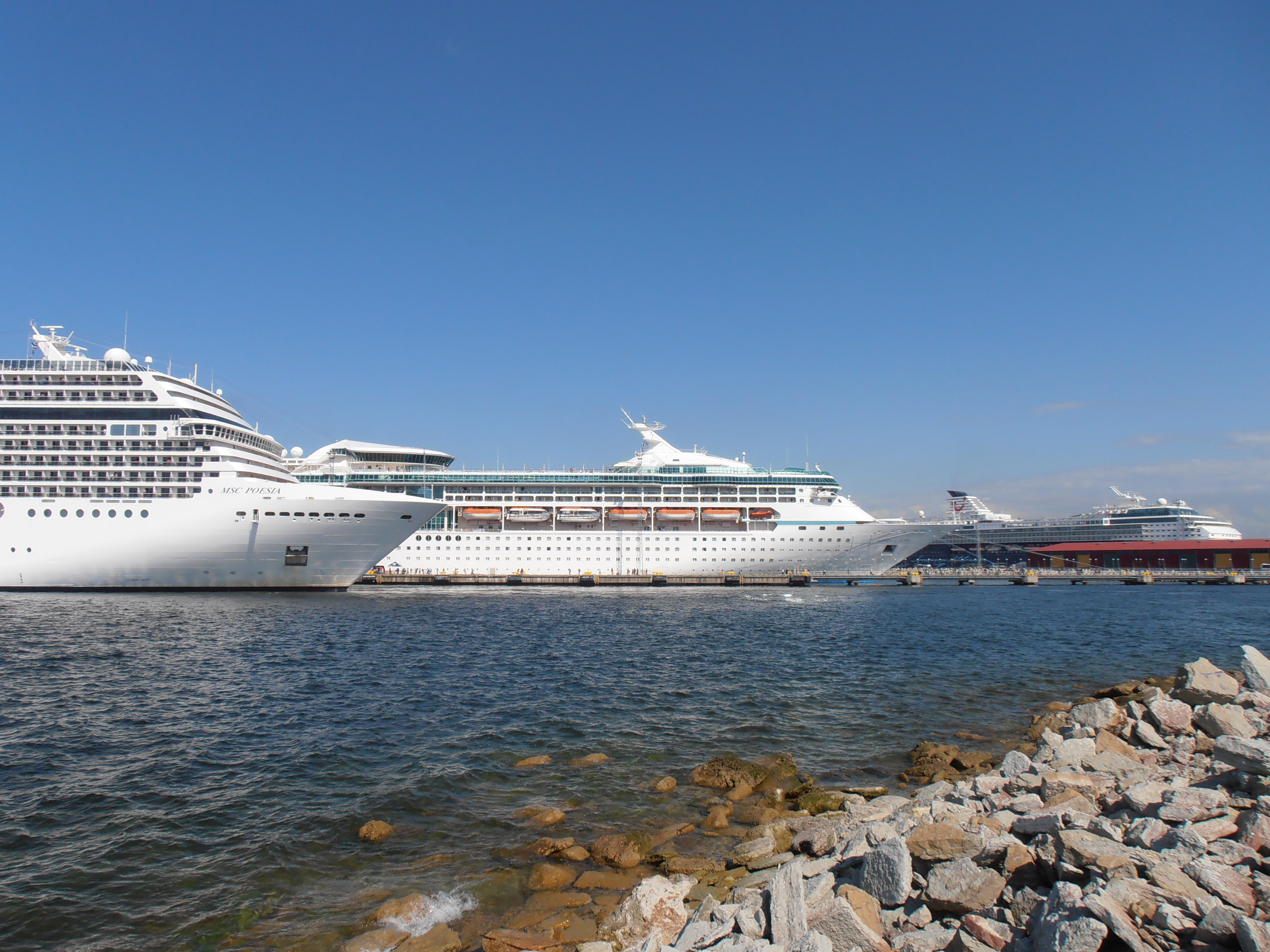
Cruise ships MSC Poesia, Vision of the Seas, and Mein Schiff Herz at Tallinn Passenger Port in Estonia

Cruise ships are large passenger ships used mainly for vacationing. Unlike ocean liners, which are used for transport, cruise ships typically embark on round-trip voyages to various ports of call, where passengers may go on shore excursions.

Modern cruise ships tend to have less hull strength, speed, and agility compared to ocean liners. However, they have added amenities to cater to water tourists, with recent vessels being described as "balcony-laden floating condominiums".

As of November 2022 there were 302 cruise ships operating worldwide, with a combined capacity of 664,602 passengers. Cruising has become a major part of the tourism industry, with an estimated market of $29.4 billion per year, and over 19 million passengers carried worldwide annually as of 2011. The industry's rapid growth saw nine or more newly built ships catering to a North American clientele added every year since 2001, as well as others servicing European clientele until the COVID-19 pandemic in 2020 saw the entire industry all but shut down. The average age of a cruise ship in 2024 is 17.5 years. The construction market for cruise ships is dominated by three European companies and one Asian company.

Operators of cruise ships are known as cruise lines. Cruise ships are organized much like floating hotels, with a complete hospitality staff in addition to the usual ship's crew. Traditionally, the ships' restaurants organize two dinner services per day, early dining and late dining, and passengers are allocated a set dining time for the entire cruise; a recent trend is to allow diners to dine whenever they want. Besides the dining room, modern cruise ships often contain one or more casual buffet-style eateries. Most cruise ships sail the Caribbean or the Mediterranean. Others operate elsewhere in places like Alaska, the South Pacific, and the Baltic Sea.

The cruise industry has been criticized for its detrimental impacts on the environment. A 2019 study found that the levels of emitted particulate matter recorded on board pose a potential health danger to passengers. Large cruise ships have been identified as one of the major causes of overtourism.

== History ==
=== Origins ===
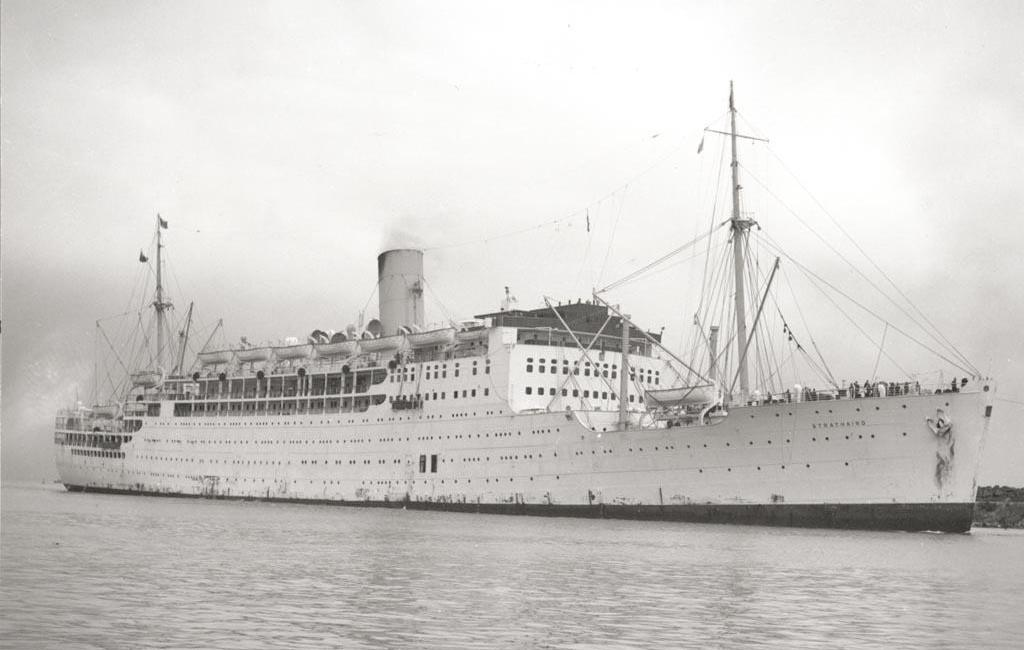
RMS Strathaird, a P&O ocean liner that sometimes served as a cruise ship. The company began offering luxury cruise services in 1944.

Italy, a traditional focus of the Grand Tour, offered an early cruise experience on the Francesco I, flying the flag of the Kingdom of the Two Sicilies. Built in 1831, the Francesco I sailed from Naples in early June 1833, preceded by an advertising campaign. Nobles, authorities, and royal princes from all over Europe boarded the cruise ship, which sailed in just over three months to Taormina, Catania, Syracuse, Malta, Corfu, Patras, Delphi, Zante, Athens, Smyrna and Constantinople, providing passengers with excursions and guided tours.

P&O first introduced passenger-cruising services in 1844, advertising sea tours to destinations such as Gibraltar, Malta and Athens, sailing from Southampton. The forerunner of modern cruise holidays, these voyages were the first of their kind. P&O Cruises is the world's oldest cruise line. The company later introduced round trips to destinations such as Alexandria and Constantinople. It underwent a period of rapid expansion in the latter half of the 19th century, commissioning larger and more luxurious ships to serve the steadily expanding market. Notable ships of the era include SS Ravenna built in 1880, which became the first ship built with a total steel superstructure.

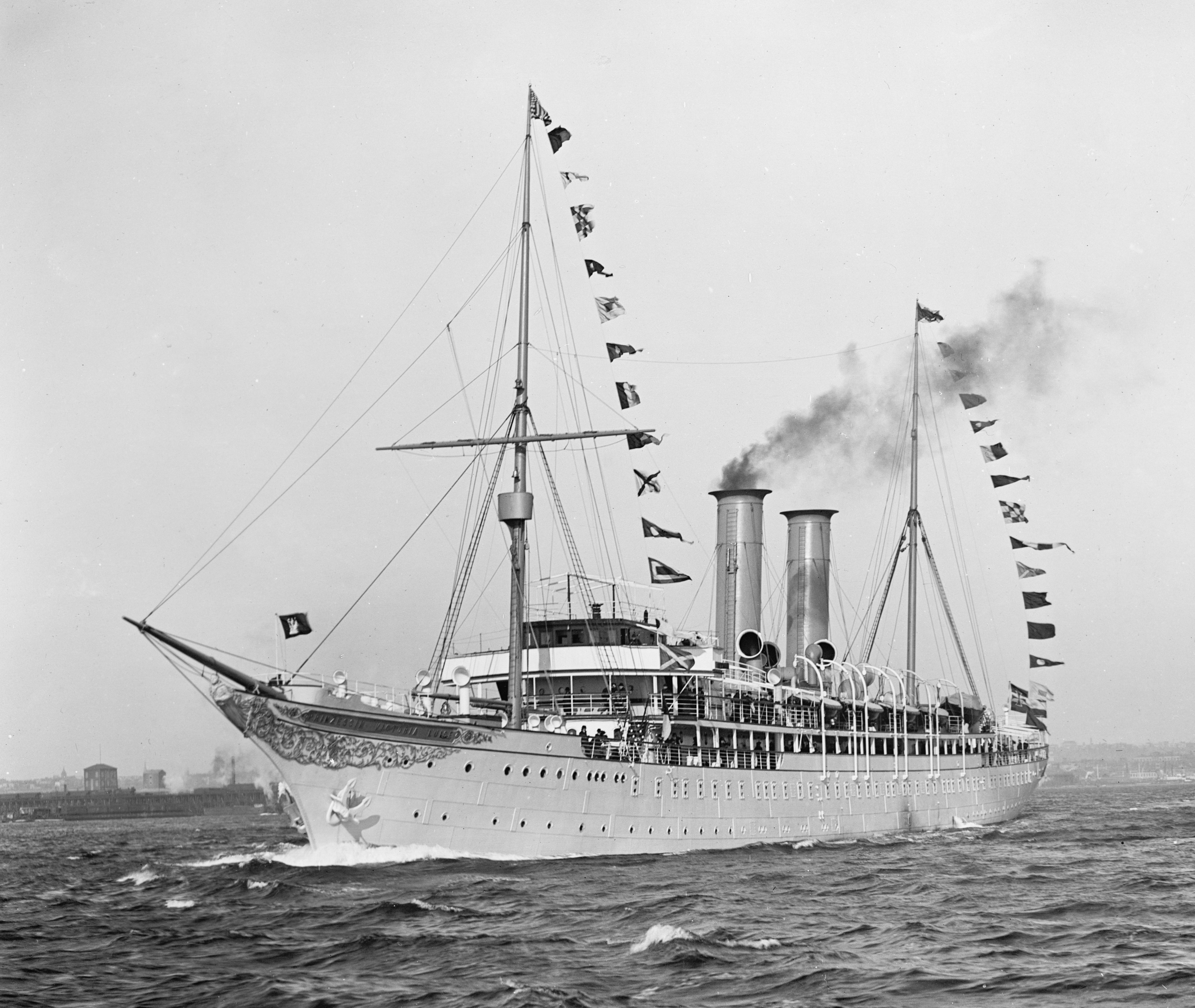
Prinzessin Victoria Luise was the first purpose-built cruise ship.

The cruise of Augusta Victoria in the Mediterranean and the Near East from 22 January to 22 March 1891, with 241 passengers including Albert Ballin and wife themselves, is often stated to have been the first ever cruise.

The first vessel built exclusively for luxury cruising was Prinzessin Victoria Luise of the German Empire, designed by Albert Ballin, general manager of the Hamburg-America Line. The ship was completed in 1900.

The practice of luxury cruising made steady inroads into the more established market for transatlantic crossings. In the competition for passengers, ocean liners – Titanic being the most famous example – added luxuries such as fine dining, luxury services, and staterooms with finer appointments. In the late-19th century, Albert Ballin, director of the Hamburg-America Line, was the first to send his transatlantic ships out on long southern cruises during the worst of the North Atlantic winter seasons. Other companies followed suit. Some of them built specialized ships designed for easy transformation between summer crossings and winter cruising.

In 1897 three luxury liners, all European-owned, offered transportation between Europe and North America. In 1906 the number had increased to seven. The British Inman Line owned City of Paris, the Cunard Line had Campania and Lucania. The White Star Line owned Majestic and Teutonic. La Lorraine and La Savoie sailed for the French Compagnie Générale Transatlantique.

Beginning in the late 19th century, the emphasis of the cruise ship industry gradually shifted from the Mediterranean to the Caribbean. As more dedicated cruise ships were built in the coming decades, the Caribbean would become the global center of cruising.

=== From luxury ocean liners to "megaship" cruising ===
Cruise passenger count has increased about 7-fold since 1990, interrupted by the COVID-19 pandemic.

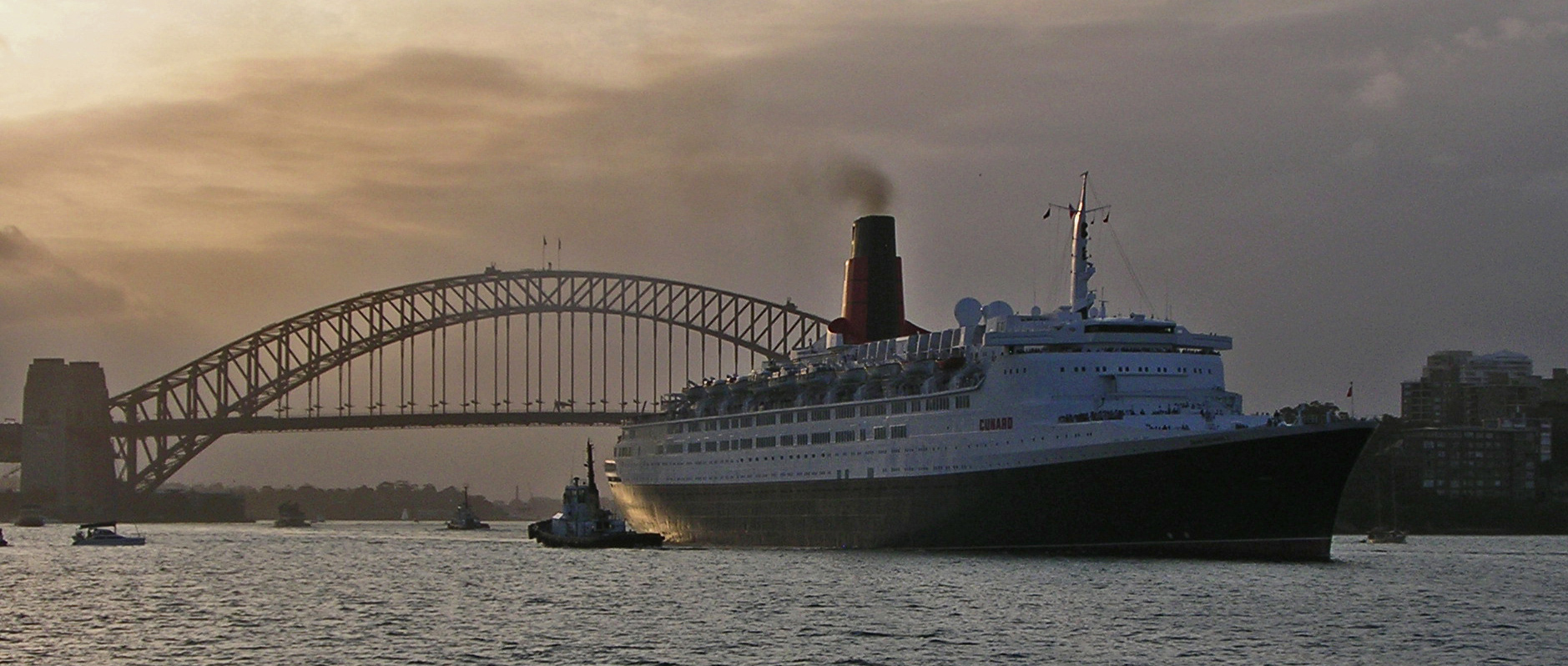
Cunard Line's Queen Elizabeth 2, having been built following the advent of the jet airliner, was convertible between ocean liner and cruise ship.

Modern cruise ships tend to have less hull strength, speed, and agility compared to ocean liners.

With the advent of large passenger jet aircraft in the 1960s, intercontinental travelers switched from ships to planes, sending the ocean liner trade into a terminal decline. Certain characteristics of older ocean liners made them unsuitable for cruising duties, such as high fuel consumption, deep draught preventing them from entering shallow ports, and cabins (often windowless) designed to maximize passenger numbers rather than comfort. In the late 1950s and 1960s, ships such as Holland America Line's SS Rotterdam (1959), the French Line's SS France (1961), and Cunard Line's RMS Queen Elizabeth 2 (1969) were designed to serve the dual purposes of ocean liner during the northern hemisphere summer months and cruise ship in the winter, incorporating doors and baffles that could be open or closed to divide classes or open the ship to one class, wherein all passengers received roughly the same quality berthing and most of the same facilities. (Passengers in cabins in certain grades on the Queen Elizabeth 2 had access only to certain dining rooms.)

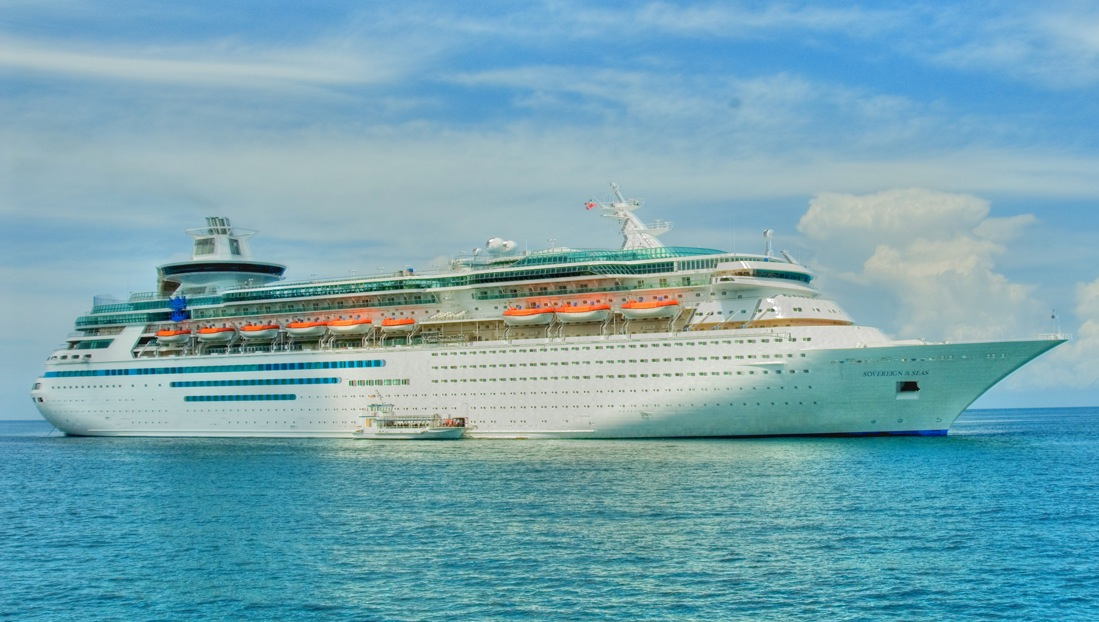
Sovereign of the Seas was the first of Royal Caribbean International's Sovereign-class cruise ships.

Ocean liner services almost ceased in the 1970s and 1980s. The Rotterdam was put on permanent cruise service in 1968, while the France (at the time the largest passenger vessel in the world) was mothballed in 1974, sold to Norwegian Cruise Line in 1979, and after major renovations relaunched as SS Norway in 1980, thus becoming the first "mega-cruise ship". The main exception was Cunard's Queen Elizabeth 2: although being put on more cruises, she maintained the regular transatlantic crossing tradition throughout the year, but with a stronger focus on leisure passengers, catering to a niche market of those who appreciated the several days at sea. International celebrities were hired to perform acts on board, along with cabarets, and with the addition of a casino and other entertainment amenities, the crossing was advertised as a vacation in itself.

The 1977–1986 television series The Love Boat helped to popularize the concept as a romantic opportunity for couples. Industry experts credit the series with increasing interest in the cruise industry, especially for those that weren't newlyweds or senior citizens, and for the resulting demand to spur investment in new ships instead of conversions. The influence was particularly notable for Princess Cruises, a line that partnered with the series and received a great deal of attention as a result.

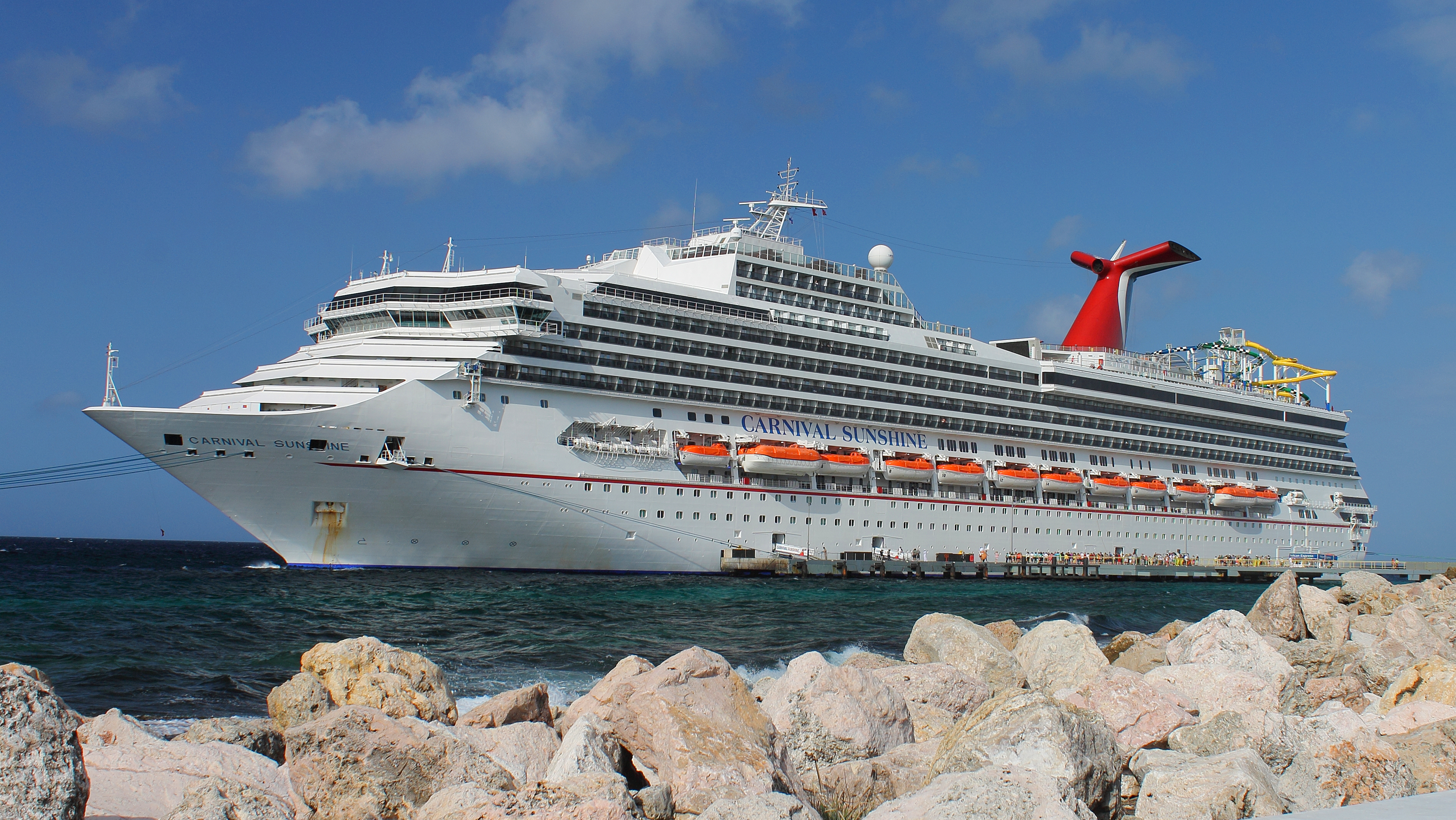
Carnival Sunshine (previously Carnival Destiny), the first cruise ship to exceed 100,000 gross tons, docked in Curaçao in 2014.

Contemporary cruise ships built in the late 1980s and later, such as the Sovereign class which broke the size record held for decades by Norway, showed characteristics of size once reserved for ocean liners. The Sovereign-class ships were the first "megaships" to be built specifically for the mass cruising market. They also were the first series of cruise ships to include a multi-story lobby with a glass elevator and had a single deck devoted entirely to cabins with private balconies, instead of oceanview cabins. Other cruise lines soon launched ships with similar attributes, such as the Fantasy class, leading up to the Panamax-type Vista class, designed such that two-thirds of the oceanview staterooms have balconies. As the veranda suites were particularly lucrative for cruise lines, something which was lacking in older ocean liners, recent cruise ships have been designed to maximize such amenities and have been described as "balcony-laden floating condominiums".

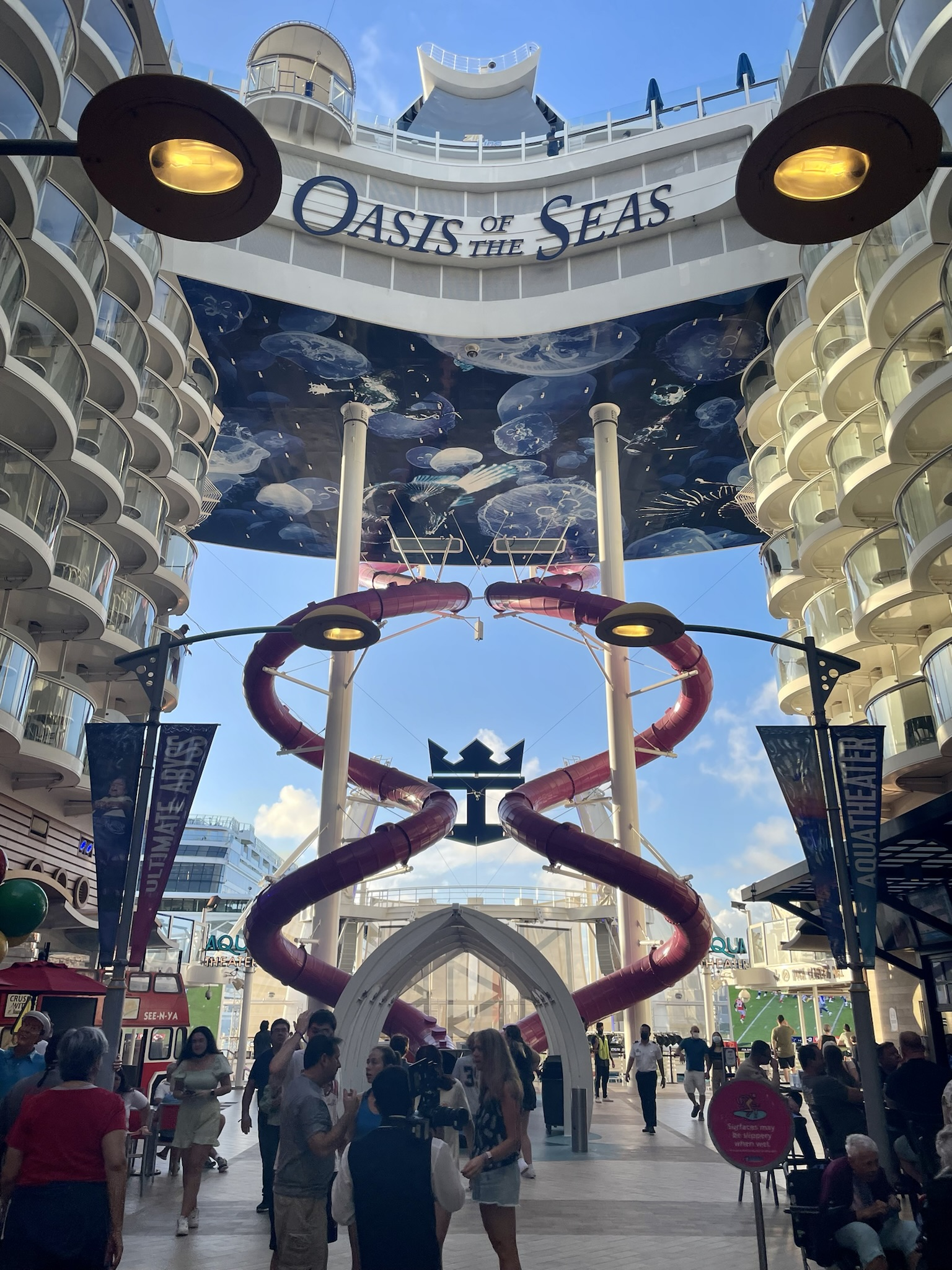
Oasis of the Seas with a six-deck-high outdoor area

Until 1975–1980, cruises offered shuffleboard, deck chairs, "drinks with umbrellas and little else for a few hundred passengers". After 1980, they offered increasing amenities. City-sized ships now have dozens of amenities.

There have been nine or more new cruise ships added every year since 2001, including the 11 members of the aforementioned Vista class, and all at 100,000 GT or greater. The only actual ocean liner to be completed in recent years has been Cunard Line's Queen Mary 2 in 2004. Following the retirement of her running mate Queen Elizabeth 2 in November 2008, Queen Mary 2 is the only liner operating on scheduled transatlantic service, though she also sees significant service on cruise routes.

Queen Mary 2 was for a time the largest passenger ship before being surpassed by Royal Caribbean International's Freedom-class vessels in 2006. The Freedom-class ships were in turn overtaken by RCI's own Oasis-class vessels which entered service in 2009 and 2010. A distinctive feature of the Oasis-class ships is the split, atrium structure, made possible by the hull's extraordinary width, with the 6-deck high Central Park and Boardwalk outdoor areas running down the middle of the ship and verandas on all decks.

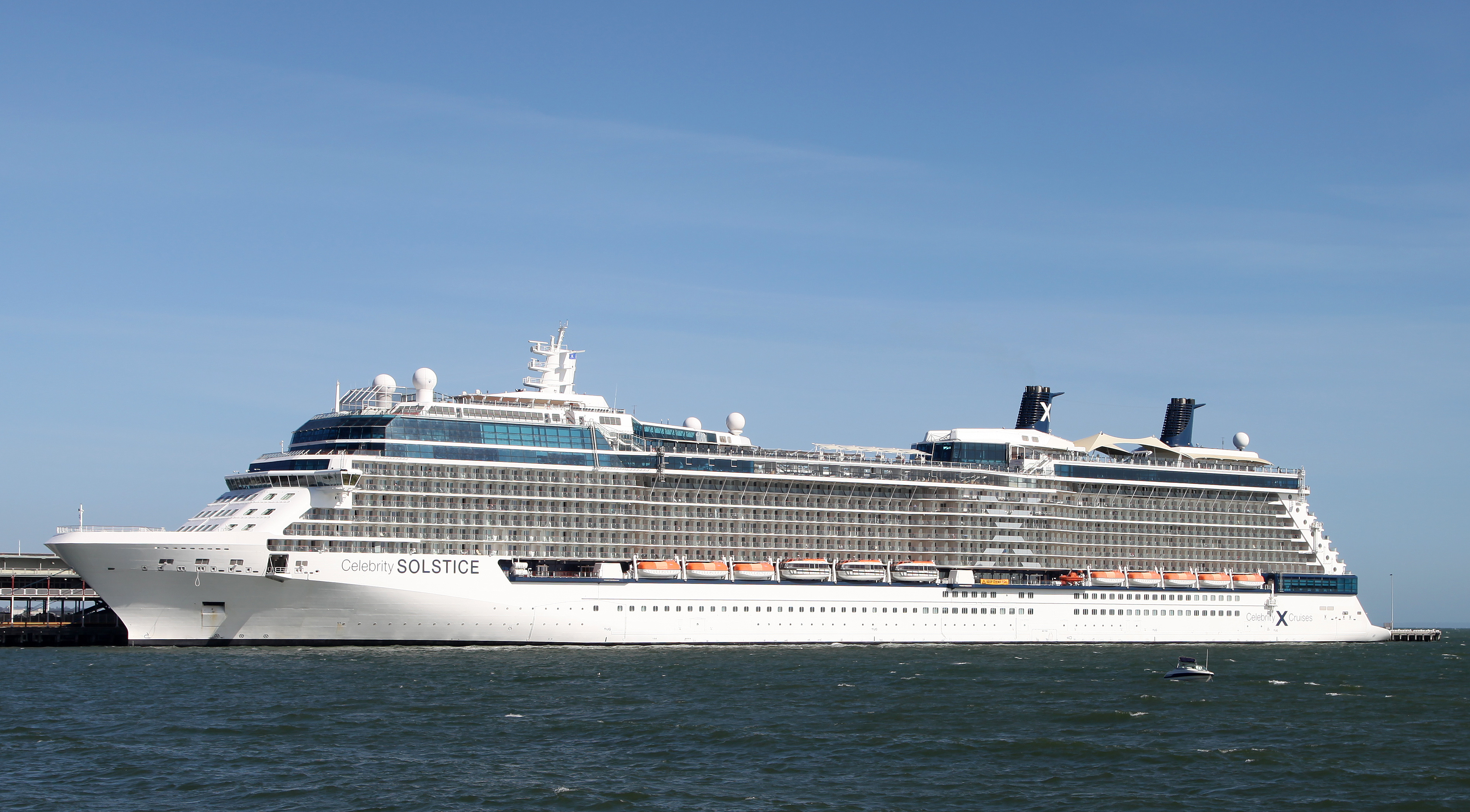
Celebrity Solstice is the lead ship of Celebrity's Solstice class of cruise ships.

In two short decades (1988–2009), the largest class cruise ships have grown a third longer (268 to 364.75 m, 879 ft 3 in to 1,196 ft 8 in), doubled their widths (32.2 to 65.7 m, 105 ft 8 in to 215 ft 7 in), nearly tripled the total passenger count (2,744 to 7,600), and more than tripled in volume (73,000 to 248,000 GT). Also, the "megaships" went from a single deck with verandas to all decks with verandas.

As of November 2022 there were 302 cruise ships operating worldwide, with a combined capacity of 664,602 passengers. Cruising has become a major part of the tourism industry, with an estimated market of $29.4 billion per year, and over 19 million passengers carried worldwide annually as of 2011. The industry's rapid growth saw nine or more newly built ships catering to a North American clientele added every year since 2001, as well as others servicing European clientele until the COVID-19 pandemic in 2020 saw the entire industry all but shut down. The average age of a cruise ship in 2024 is 17.5 years.

== Cruise lines ==
Operators of cruise ships and tourist riverboats are known as cruise lines, which are companies that sell cruises to the public. Some cruise lines are direct descendants of traditional passenger shipping lines while others were founded specifically for cruising. The business is extremely volatile. Cruise ships are very expensive to build and operate, and a drop in bookings can put a company out of business. Ships are often renovated, renamed or sold to keep up with trends.

== Organization ==
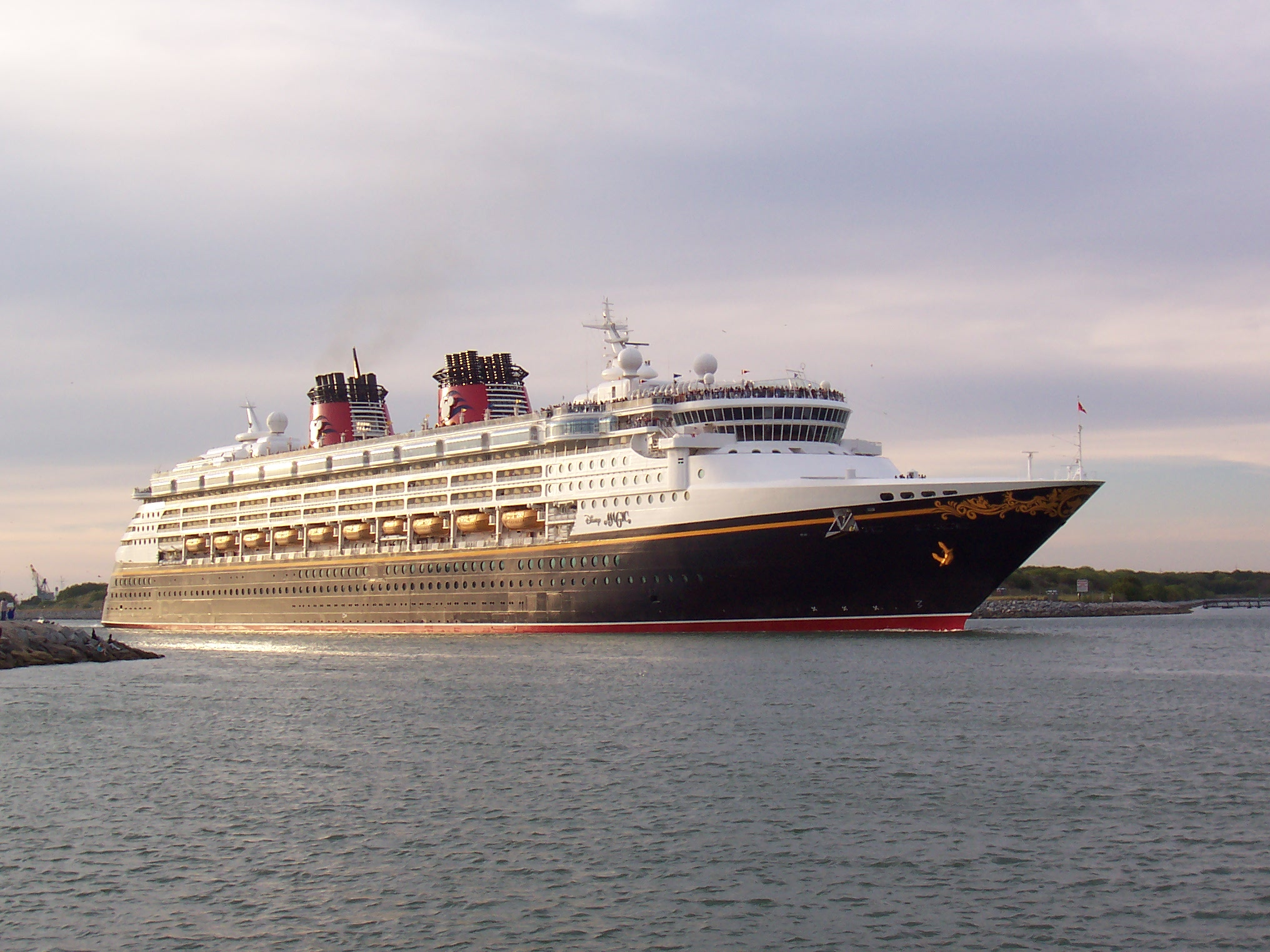
Disney Cruise Line's cruise ship Disney Magic departing Port Canaveral

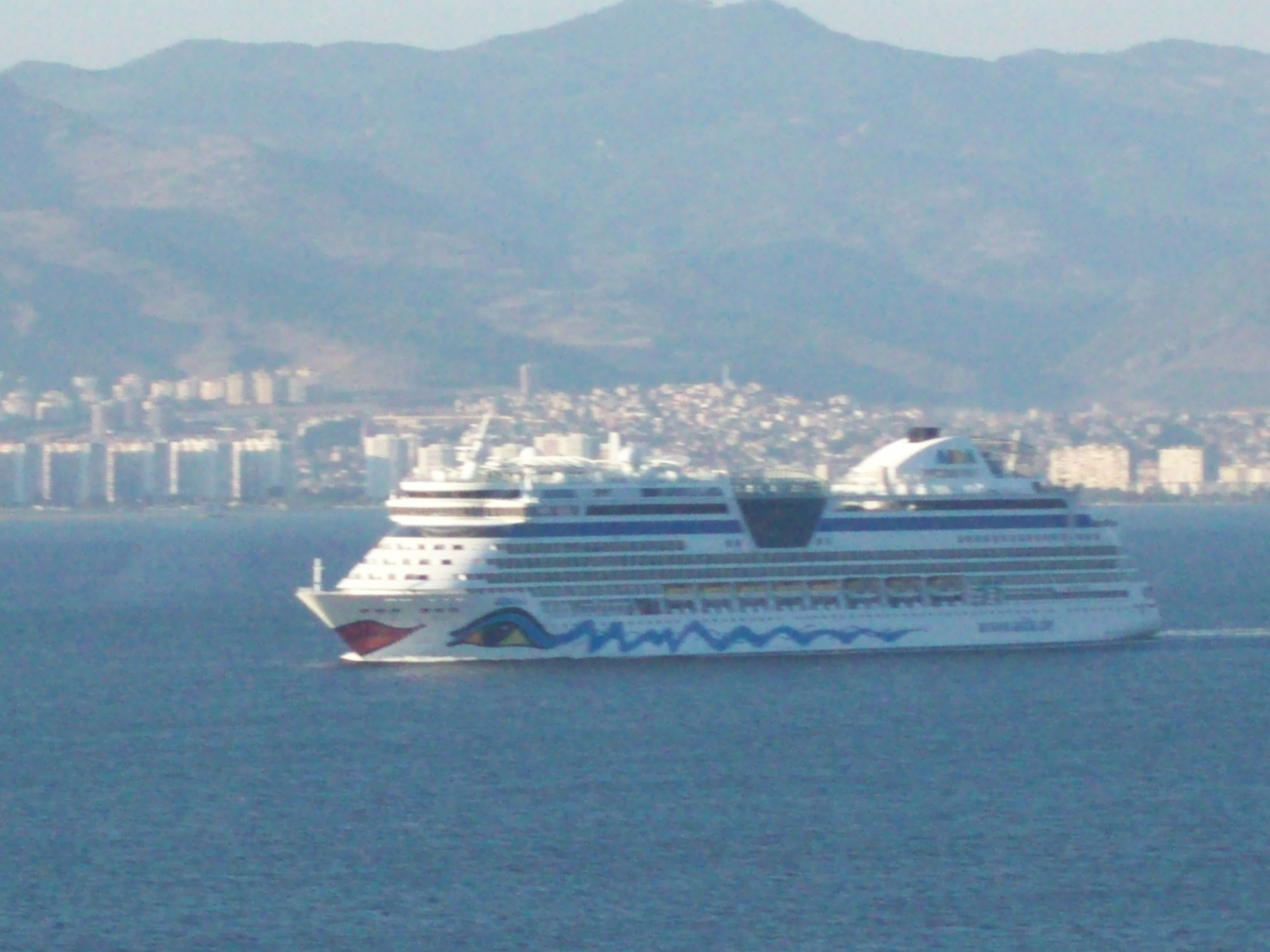
AIDAdiva in İzmir

Princess Cruises' Coral-class cruise ship, Island Princess in Cabo San Lucas

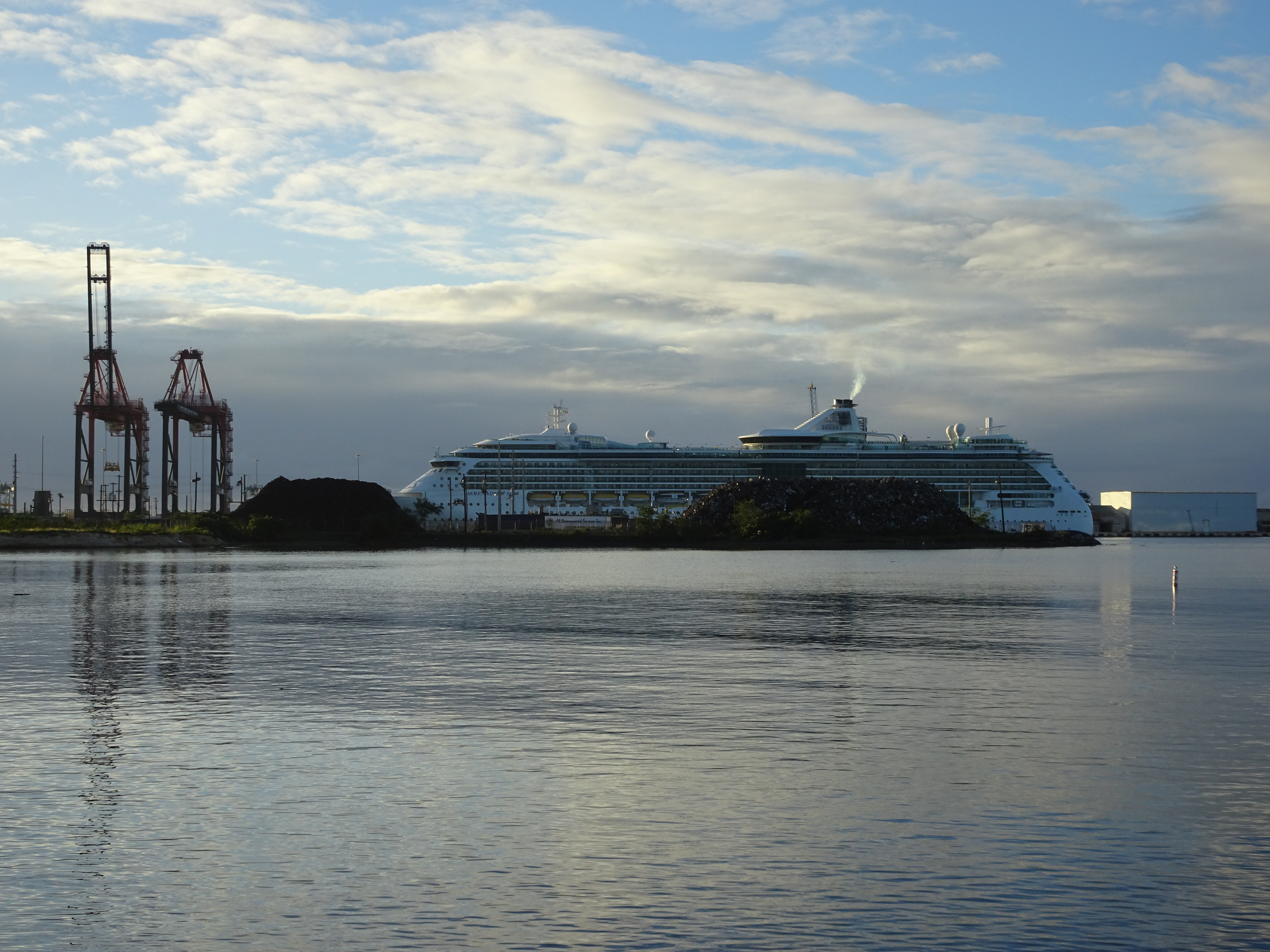
Serenade of the Seas is one of Royal Caribbean's Radiance class of cruise ships.

Cruise ships are organized much like floating hotels, with a complete hospitality staff in addition to the usual ship's crew. It is not uncommon for the most luxurious ships to have more crew and staff than passengers.

=== Dining ===
Dining on almost all cruise ships is included in the cruise price. Traditionally, the ships' restaurants organize two dinner services per day, early dining and late dining, and passengers are allocated a set dining time for the entire cruise; a recent trend is to allow diners to dine whenever they want. Having two dinner times allows the ship to have enough time and space to accommodate all of its guests. Having two different dinner services can cause some conflicts with some of the ship's events (such as shows and performances) for the late diners, but this problem is usually fixed by having a shorter version of the event take place before late dinner. Cunard Line ships maintain the class tradition of ocean liners and have separate dining rooms for different types of suites, while Celebrity Cruises and Princess Cruises have a standard dining room and "upgrade" specialty restaurants that require pre-booking and cover charges. Many cruises schedule one or more "formal dining" nights. Guests dress "formally", however, that is defined for the ship, often suits and ties or even tuxedos for men, and formal dresses for women. The menu is more upscale than usual.

Besides the dining room, modern cruise ships often contain one or more casual buffet-style eateries, which may be open 24 hours and with menus that vary throughout the day to provide meals ranging from breakfast to late-night snacks. In recent years, cruise lines have started to include a diverse range of ethnically themed restaurants aboard each ship. Ships also feature numerous bars and nightclubs for passenger entertainment; the majority of cruise lines do not include alcoholic beverages in their fares and passengers are expected to pay for drinks as they consume them. Most cruise lines also prohibit passengers from bringing aboard and consuming their own beverages, including alcohol, while aboard. Alcohol purchased duty-free is sealed and returned to passengers when they disembark.

There is often a central galley responsible for serving all major restaurants aboard the ship, though specialty restaurants may have their own separate galleys.

As with any vessel, adequate provisioning is crucial, especially on a cruise ship serving several thousand meals at each seating. For example, a quasi "military operation" is required to load and unload 3,600 passengers and eight tons of food at the beginning and end of each cruise, for the Royal Princess.

=== Other on-board facilities ===
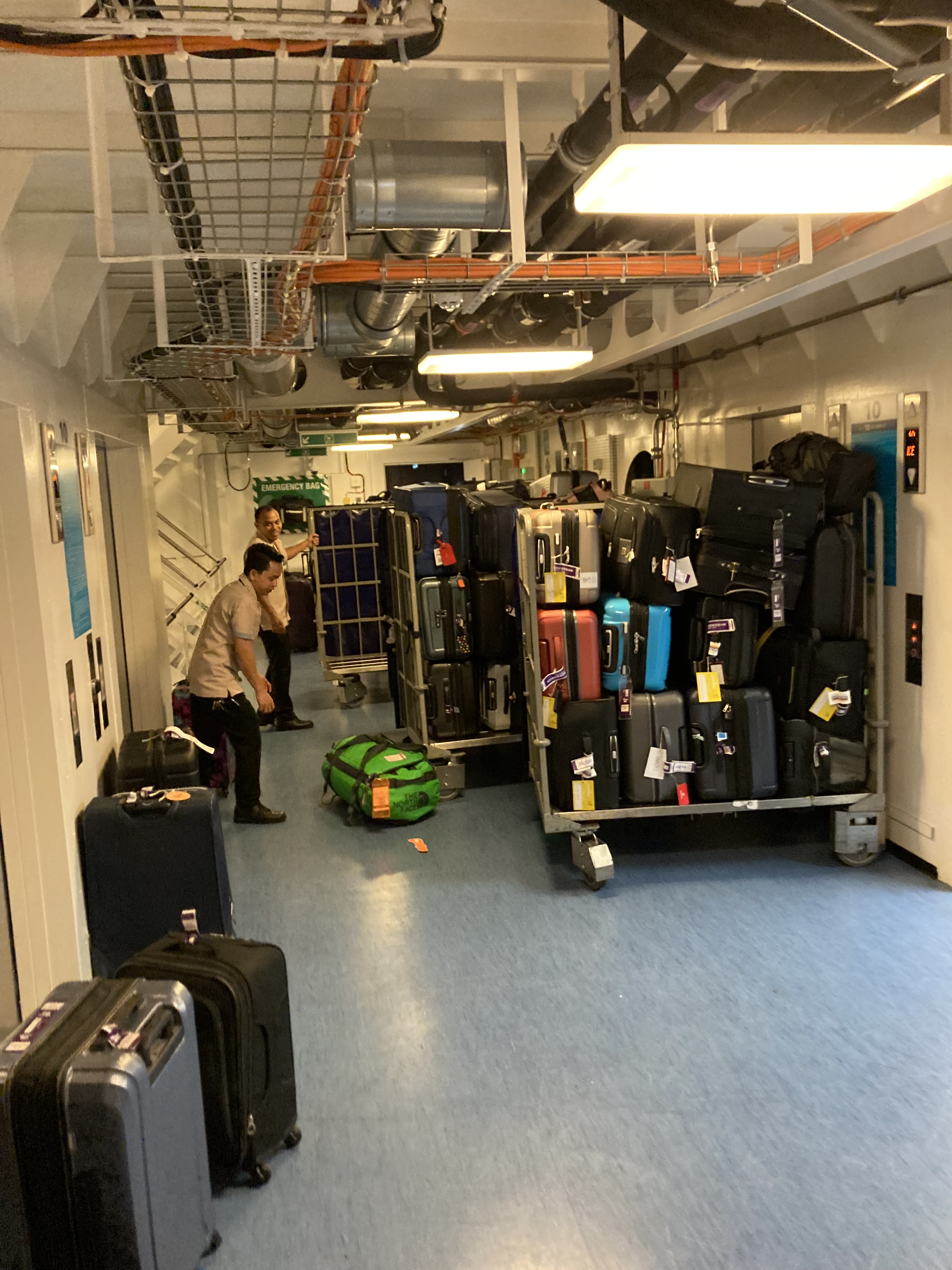
Receiving luggage on a cruise ship. It is then distributed to the cabins.

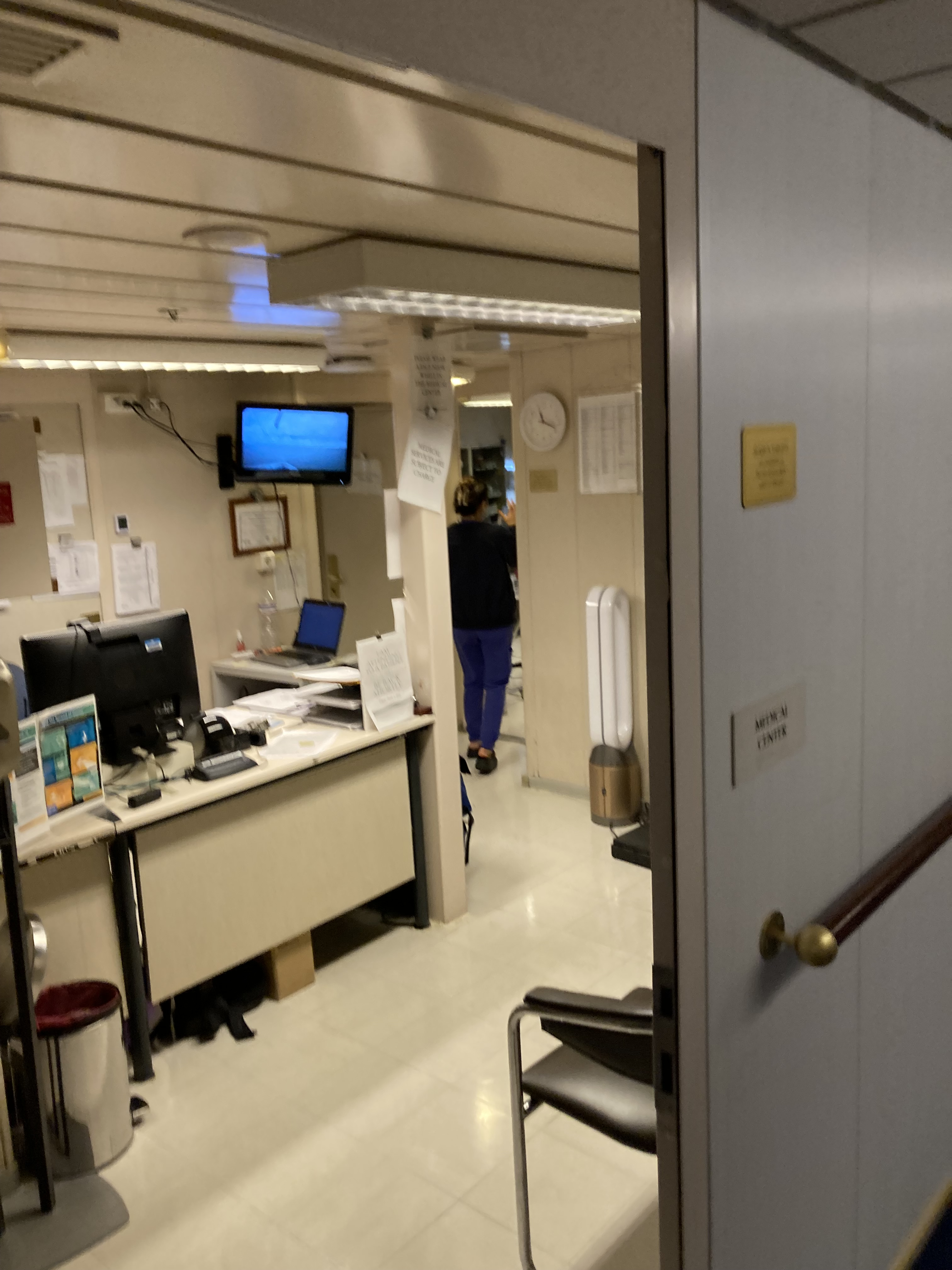
Clinic intake area on a cruise ship

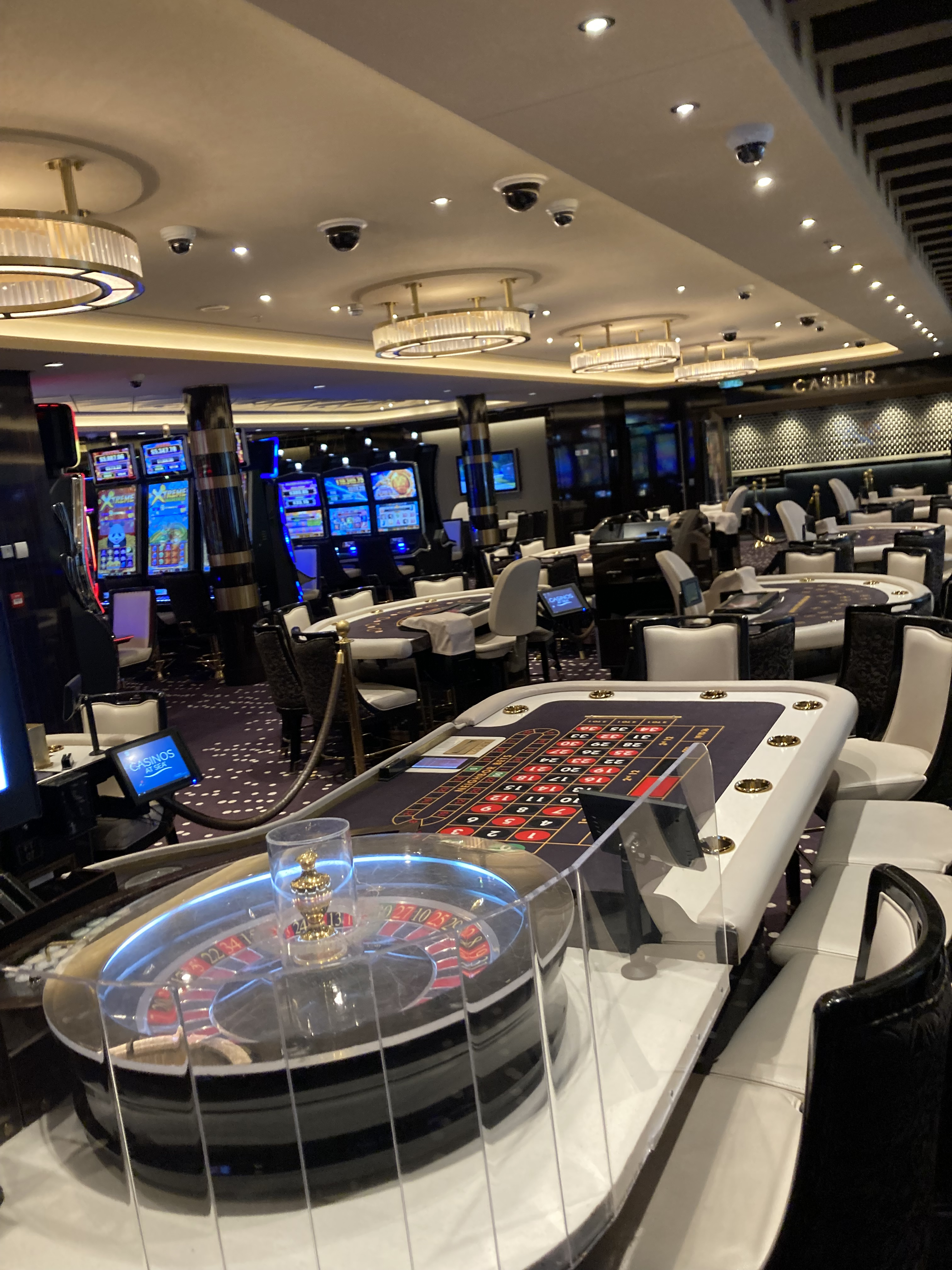
A view of the casino on the Norwegian Cruise Line ship Bliss

Modern cruise ships typically have aboard some or all of the following facilities:

- Buffet restaurant
- Card room
- Casino – Only open when the ship is at sea to avoid conflict with local laws
- Child care facilities
- Cinema
- Clubs
- Fitness center
- Hot tub
- Indoor and/or outdoor swimming pool with water slides
- Infirmary and morgue
- Karaoke
- Library
- Lounges
- Observation lounge
- Ping pong tables
- Pool tables
- Shops – Only open when the ship is at sea to avoid merchandising licensing and local taxes
- Spa
- Teen lounges
- Theatre with Broadway-style shows

Some ships have bowling alleys, ice skating rinks, rock climbing walls, sky-diving simulators, miniature golf courses, video arcades, ziplines, surfing simulators, water slides, basketball courts, tennis courts, chain restaurants, ropes obstacle courses, and even roller coasters.

The casino floors typically open when the ships enter international waters, usually 12 nautical miles from the coastline. Beyond that limit, they are generally governed by the laws of the nation in which they are registered.

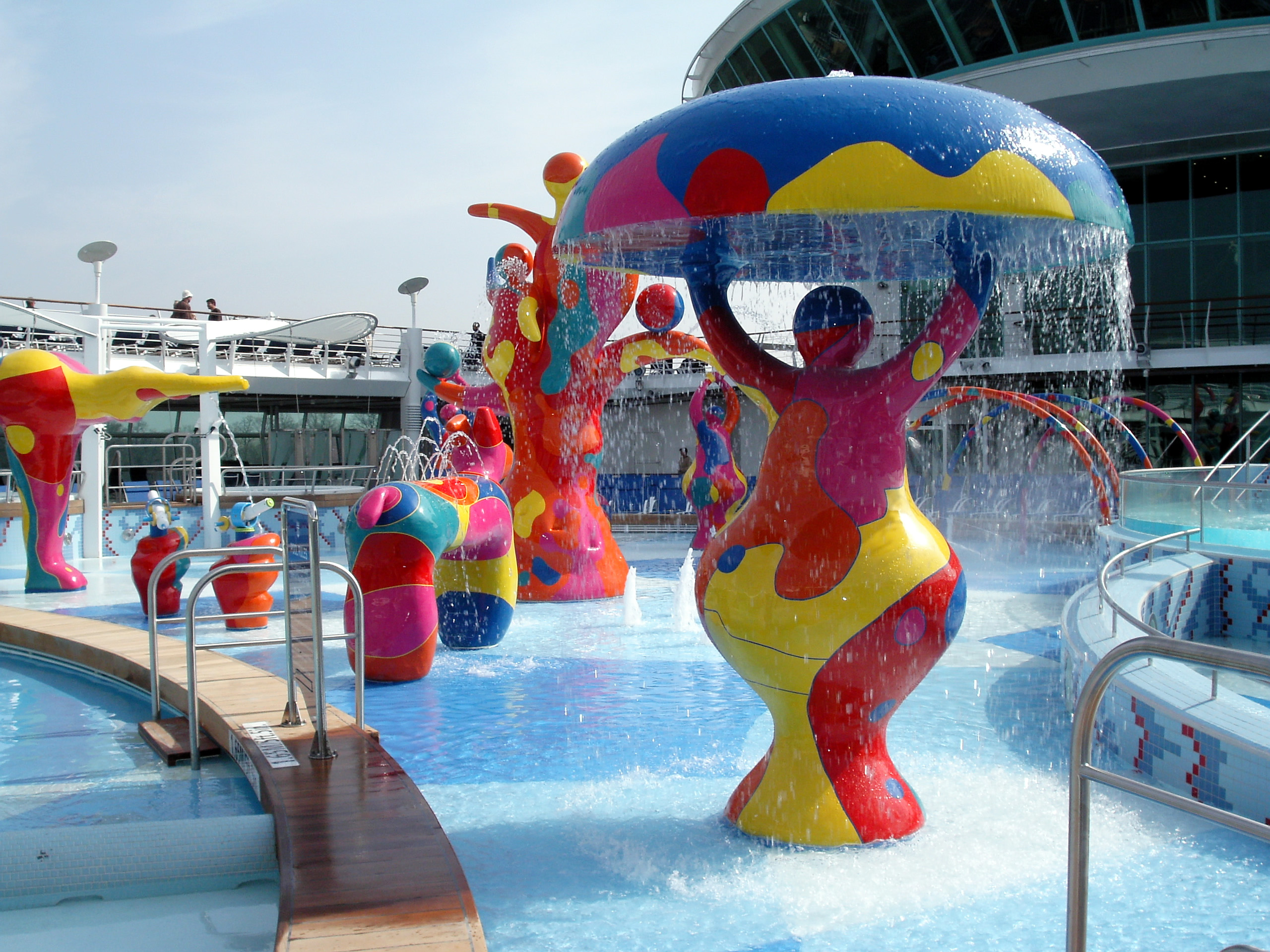
H2OZone aboard Freedom of the Seas

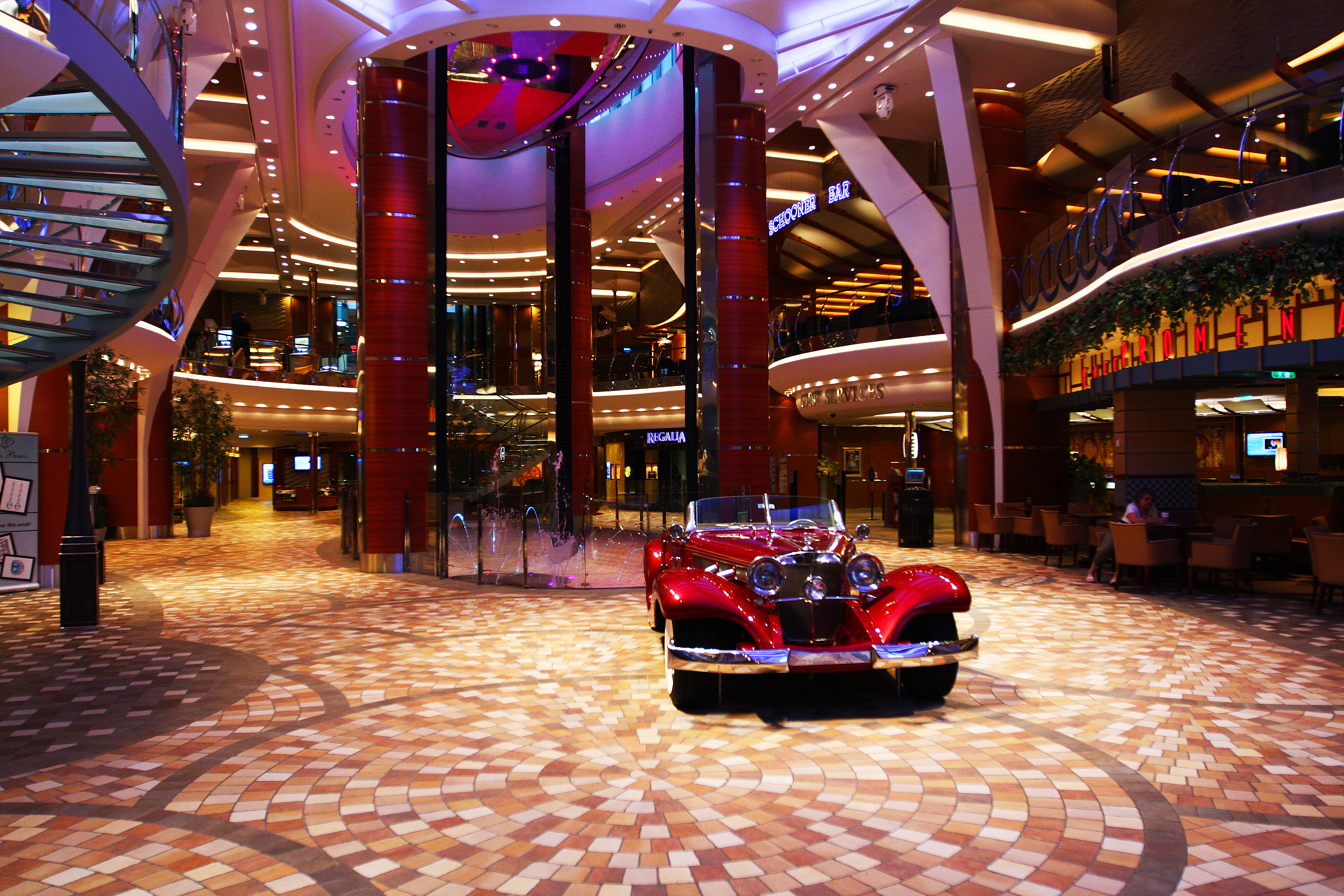
Promenade on the Allure of the Seas

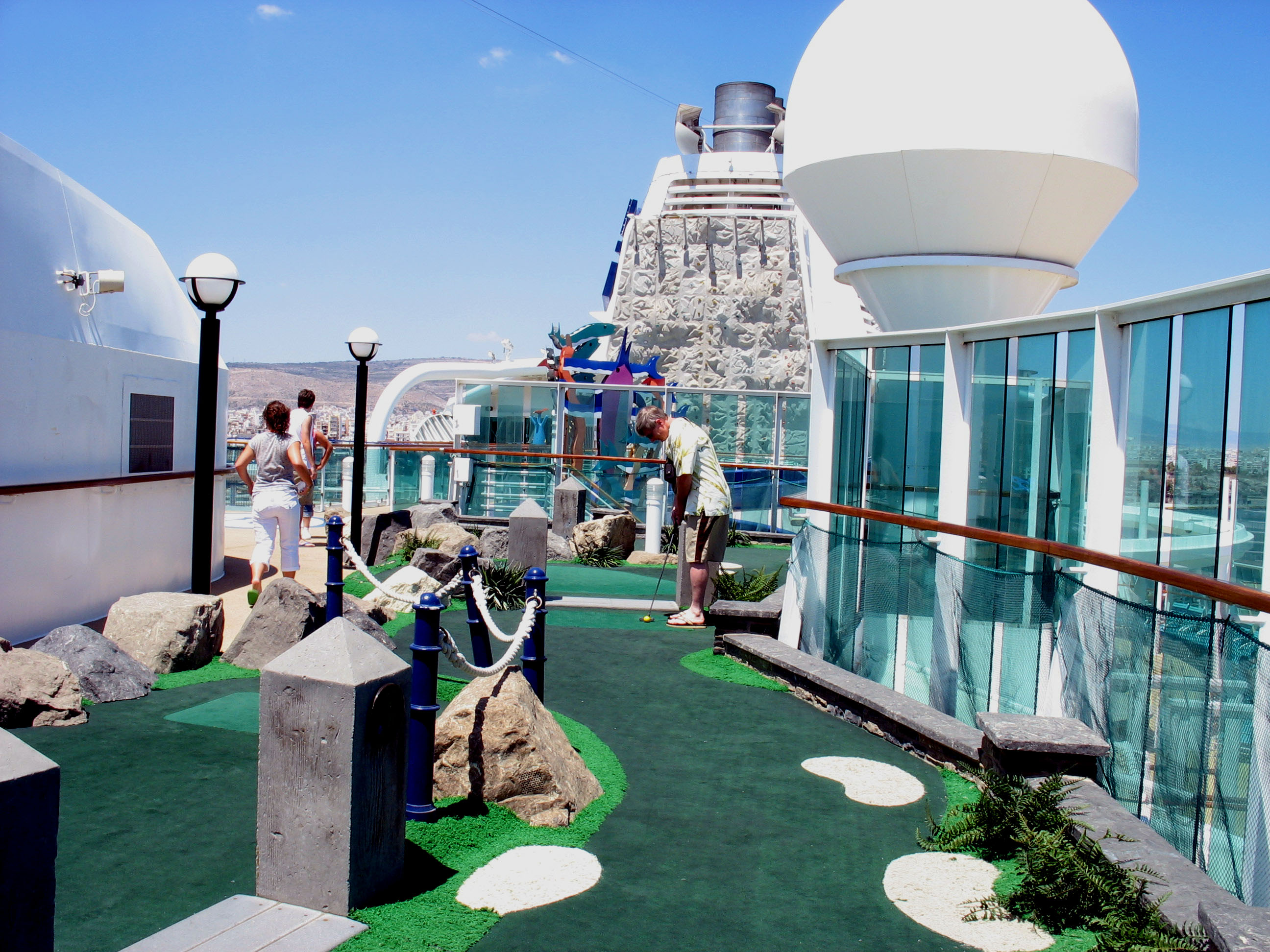
Golf course on Brilliance of the Seas

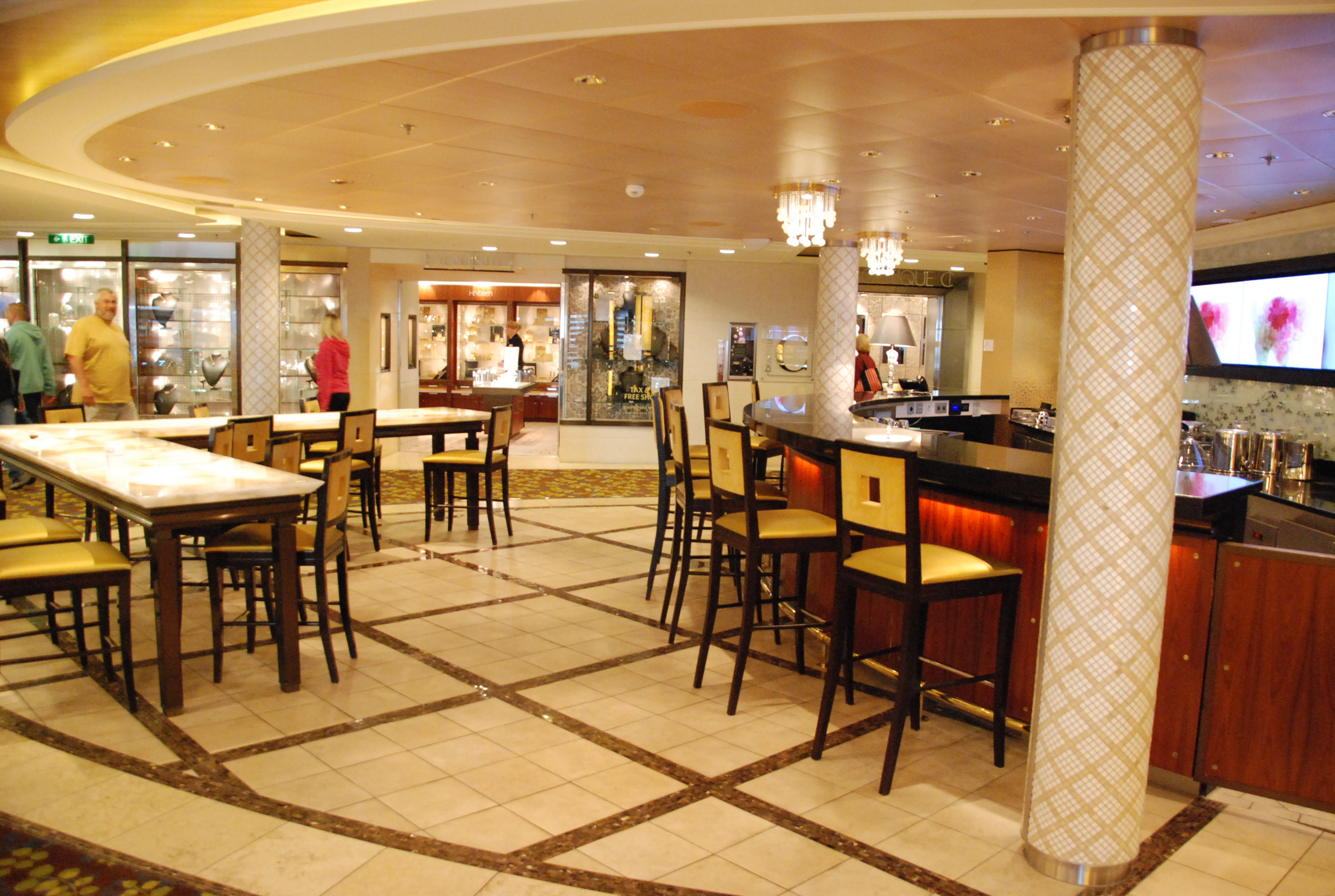
Molecular Bar aboard the Celebrity Equinox before Christmas

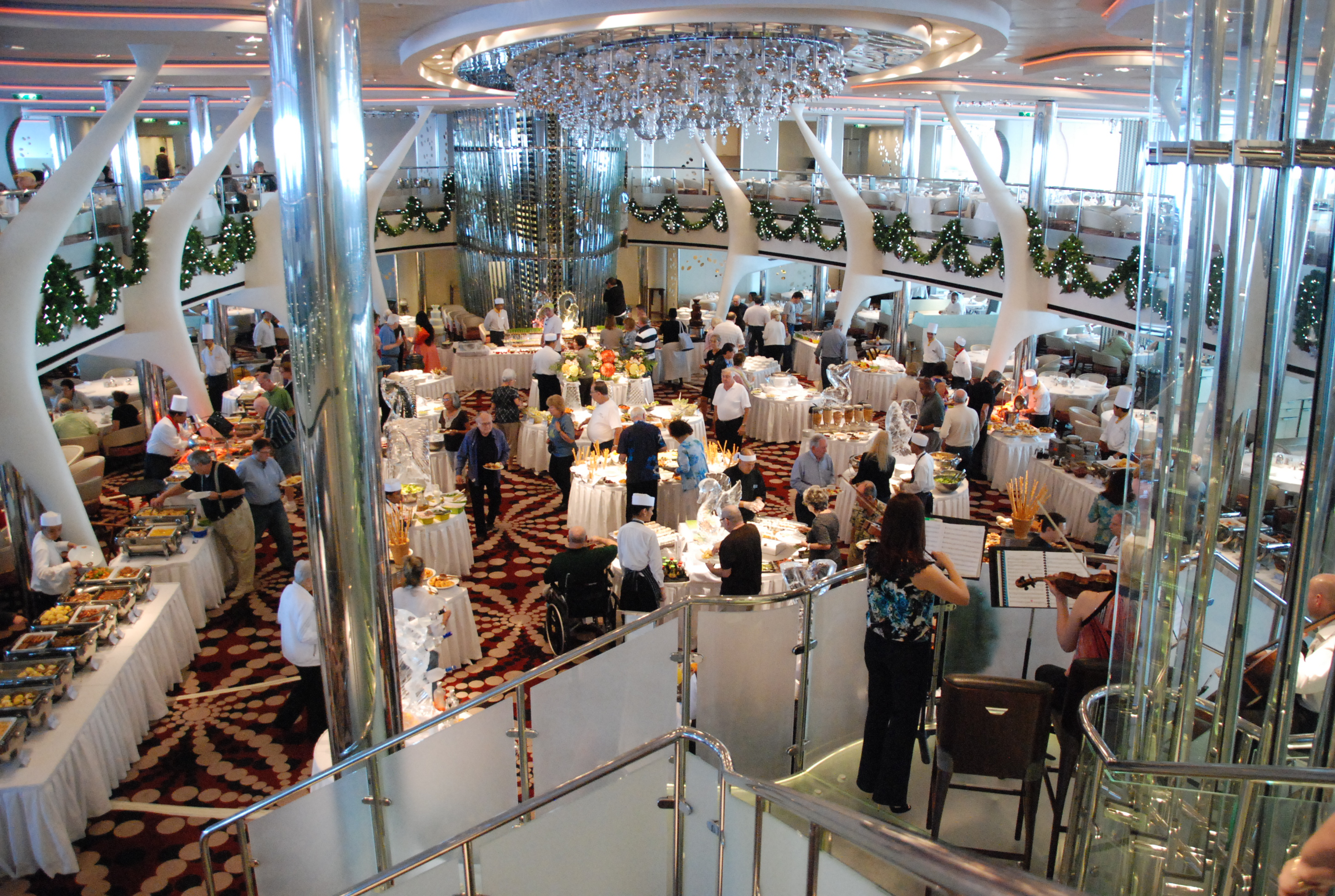
Formal brunch aboard the Celebrity Equinox

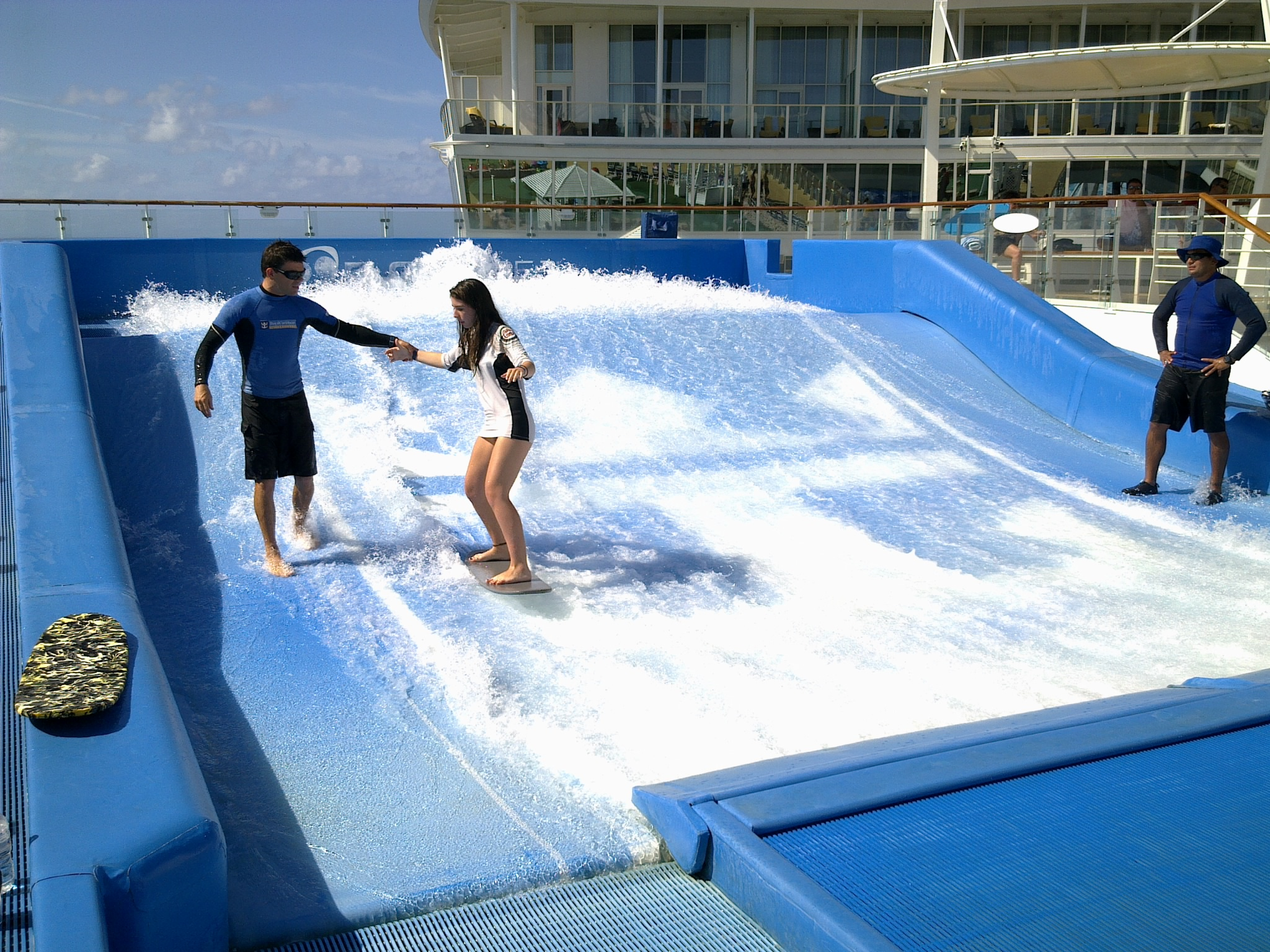
Surf simulator on Oasis of the Seas

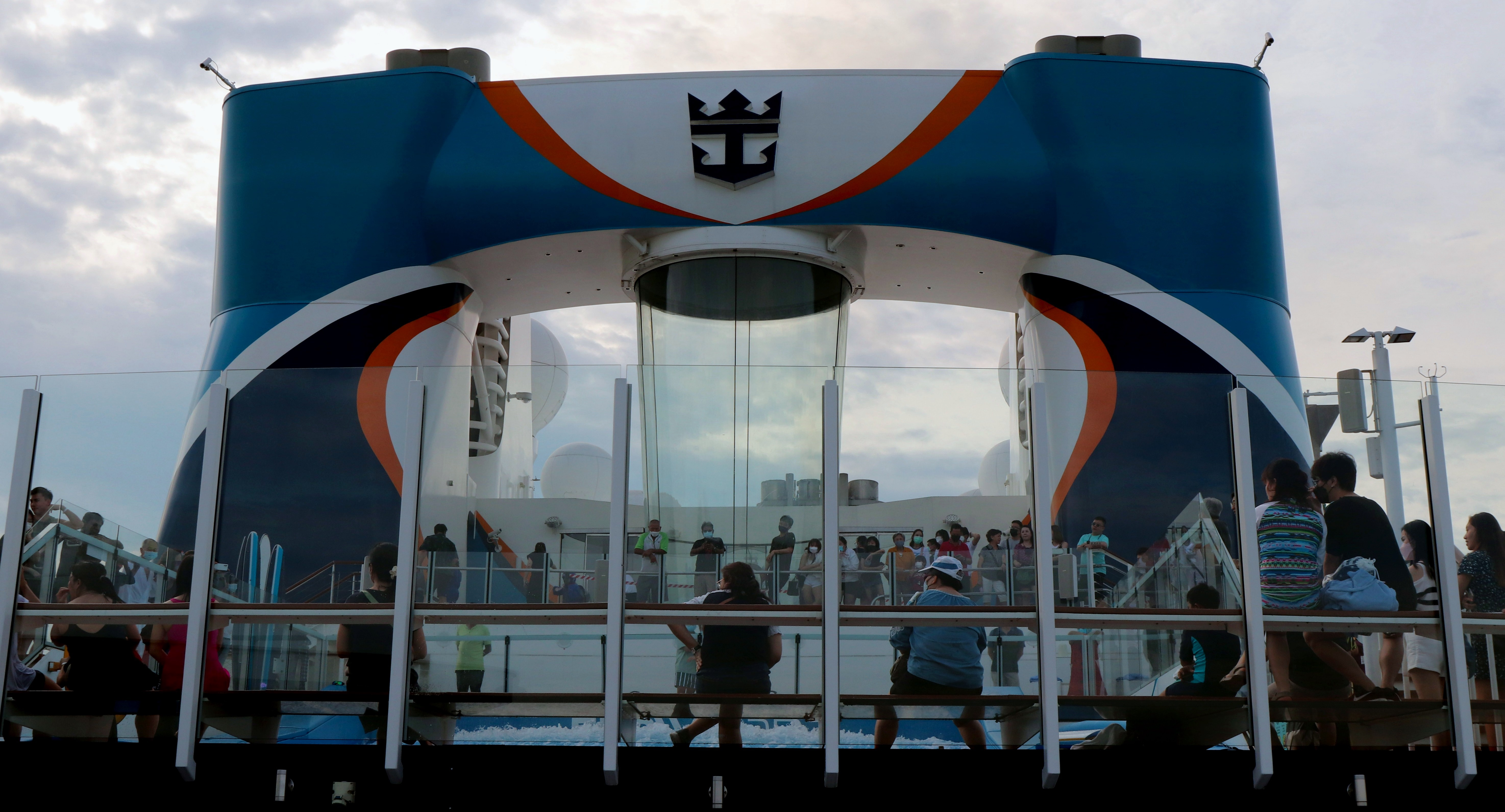
Skydiving simulator on Spectrum of the Seas

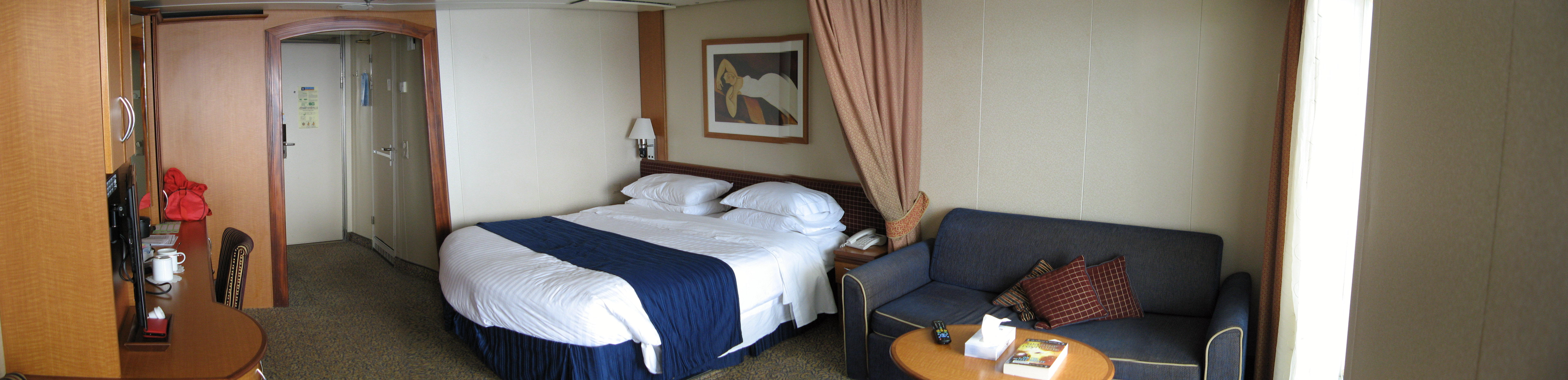
A junior suite on Radiance of the Seas

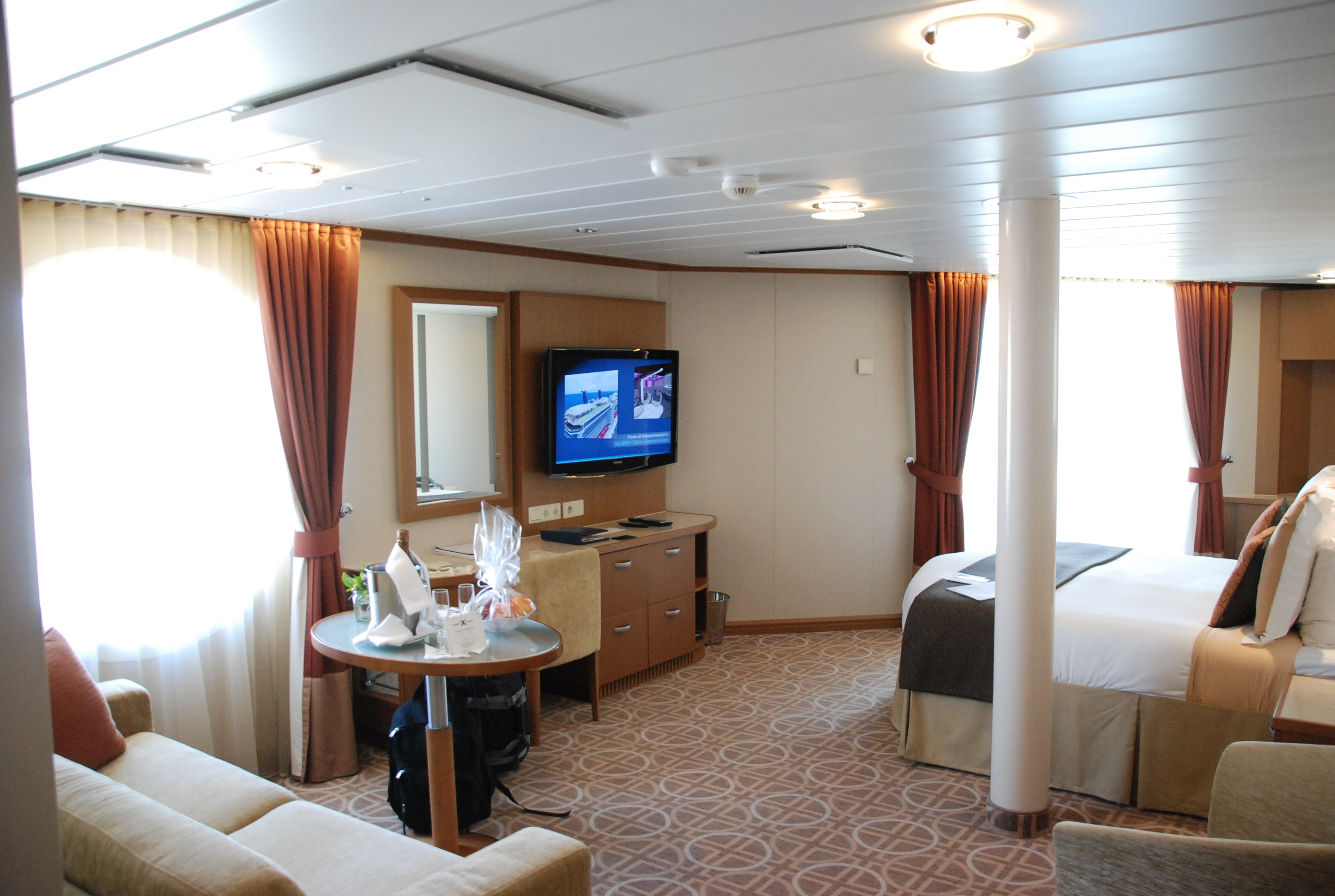
A luxury suite aboard the Celebrity Equinox

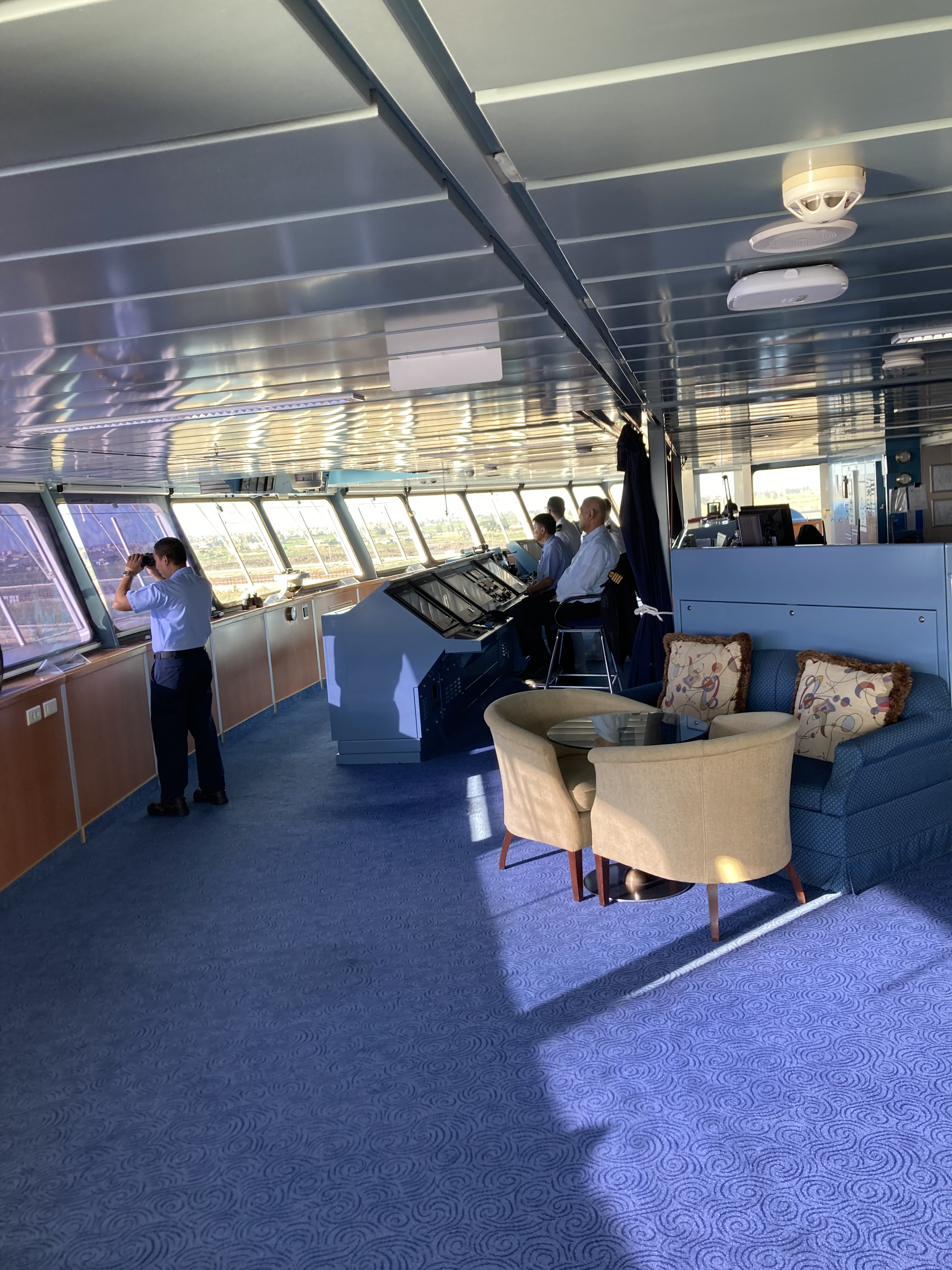
Bridge of MS Nautica

=== Crew ===
Crew are usually hired on three to eleven month contracts which may then be renewed as mutually agreed, depending on service ratings from passengers as well as the cyclical nature of the cruise line operator. Most staff work 77-hour work weeks for 10 months continuously followed by two months of vacation.

There are no paid vacations or pensions for service, non-management crew, depending on the level of the position and the type of the contract. Non-service and management crew members get paid vacation, medical, retirement options, and can participate in the company's group insurance plan.

The direct salary is low by North American standards, though restaurant staff have considerable earning potential from passenger tips. Crew members do not have any expenses while on board, because food and accommodation, medical care, and transportation for most employees, are included. Bard College at Simon's Rock professor Francisca Oyogoa states that "Crewing agencies often exploit the desperation of potential employees."

Living arrangements vary by cruise line, but mostly by shipboard position. In general two employees share a cabin with a shower, commode and a desk with a television set, while senior officers are assigned single cabins. There is a set of facilities for the crew separate from that for passengers, such as mess rooms and bars, recreation rooms, prayer rooms/mosques, and fitness center, with some larger ships even having a crew deck with a swimming pool and hot tubs.

The International Labour Organization's 2006 Maritime Labour Convention is also known as the "Seafarers' Bill of Rights".

=== Business model ===
Most cruise lines since the 2000s have to some extent priced the cruising experience à la carte, as passenger spending aboard generates significantly more than ticket sales. The passenger's ticket includes the stateroom accommodation, room service, unlimited meals in the main dining room (or main restaurant) and buffet, access to shows, and use of pool and gym facilities, while there is a daily gratuity charge to cover housekeeping and waiter service. However, there are extra charges for alcohol and soft drinks, official cruise photos, Internet and wi-fi access, and specialty restaurants. Cruise lines earn significantly from selling onshore excursions offered by local contractors; keeping 50% or more of what passengers spend for these tours. In addition, cruise ships earn significant commissions on sales from onshore stores that are promoted on board as "preferred" (as much as 40% of gross sales). Facilitating this practice are modern cruise terminals with establishments of duty-free shops inside a perimeter accessible only by passengers and not by locals. Ports of call have often oriented their own businesses and facilities towards meeting the needs of visiting cruise ships. In one case, Icy Strait Point in Alaska, the entire destination was created explicitly and solely for cruise ship visitors.

On "cruises to nowhere" or "nowhere voyages", some cruise ships make two- to three-night round trips without visiting any ports of call. However, in 2016, the U.S. Department of Homeland Security's Customs and Border Protection cracked down on the enforcement of maritime laws, and foreign-flagged ships could no longer sail without calling in a foreign port along the way. By this interpretation, even if a cruise to nowhere enters international water, legally the cruise is not considered to have left the US because the ship never touches a foreign country or territory.

Travel to and from the port of departure is usually the passengers' responsibility, although purchasing a transfer pass from the cruise line for the trip between the airport and cruise terminal will guarantee that the ship will not leave until the passenger is aboard. Similarly, if the passenger books a shore excursion with the cruise line and the tour runs late, the ship is obliged to remain until the passenger returns.

Luxury cruise lines such as Regent Seven Seas Cruises and Crystal Cruises market their fares as "all-inclusive". For example, the base fare on Regent Seven Seas ships includes most alcoholic beverages on board ship and most shore excursions in ports of call, as well as all gratuities that would normally be paid to hotel staff on the ship. The fare may also include a one-night hotel stay before boarding, and the air fare to and from the cruise's origin and destination ports.

Many cruise lines have loyalty programs. Using these and by booking inexpensive tickets, some people have found it cheaper to live continuously on cruise ships instead of on land.

Some cruises incorporate themes in an experience economy offering, such as sports or leisure activities, food, or history. The High Seas Rally is one such themed cruise, combining a cruise and a motorcycle rally.

=== Cruise ship utilization ===
Cruise ships and former liners sometimes find use in applications other than those for which they were built. Due to slower speed and reduced seaworthiness, as well as being largely introduced after several major wars, cruise ships have also been used as troop transport vessels. By contrast, ocean liners were often seen as the pride of their country and used to rival liners of other nations, and have been requisitioned during both World Wars and the Falklands War to transport soldiers and serve as hospital ships.

During the 1992 Summer Olympics, eleven cruise ships docked at the Port of Barcelona for an average of 18 days, served as floating hotels to help accommodate the large influx of visitors to the Games. They were available to sponsors and hosted 11,000 guests a day, making it the second largest concentration of Olympic accommodation behind the Olympic Village. This hosting solution has been used since then in Games held in coastal cities, such as at Sydney 2000, Athens 2004, London 2012, Sochi 2014, Rio 2016 and was going to be used at Tokyo 2020.

Cruise ships have been used to accommodate displaced persons during hurricanes. For example, on 1 September 2005, the U.S. Federal Emergency Management Agency (FEMA) contracted three Carnival Cruise Lines vessels (Carnival Fantasy, the former Carnival Holiday, and the Carnival Sensation) to house Hurricane Katrina evacuees. In 2017, cruise ships were used to help transport residents from some Caribbean islands destroyed by Hurricane Irma, as well as Puerto Rico residents displaced by Hurricane Maria.

Cruise ships have also been used for evacuations. In 2010, in response to the shutdown of UK airspace due to the eruption of Iceland's Eyjafjallajökull volcano, the newly completed Celebrity Eclipse was used to rescue 2,000 British tourists stranded in Spain as an act of goodwill by the owners. The ship departed from Southampton for Bilbao on 21 April, and returned on 23 April. A cruise ship was kept on standby in case inhabitants of Kangaroo Island required evacuation in 2020 after a series of fires burned on the island.

== Shipyards ==
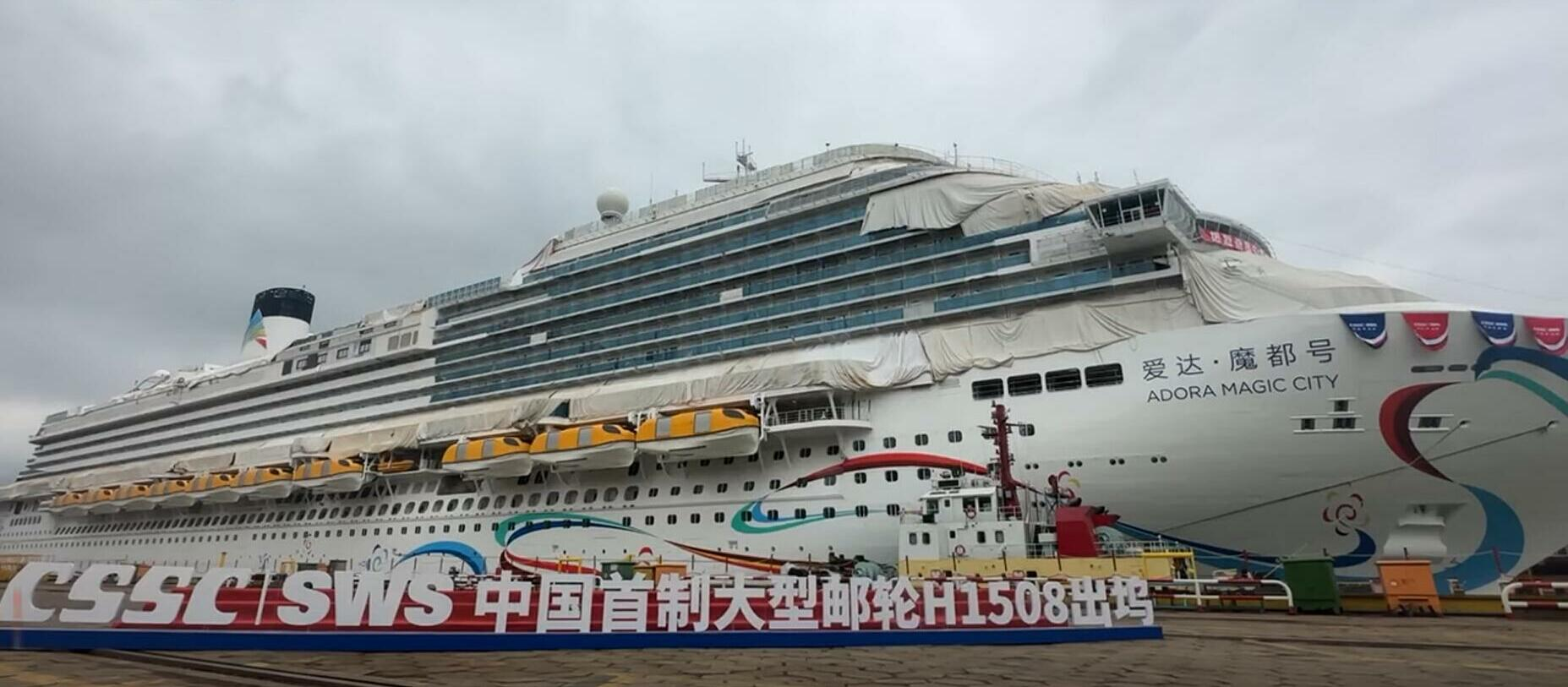
First Chinese-built cruise ship Adora Magic City in Shanghai, 2023

The construction market for cruise ships is dominated by three European companies and one Asian company:

- Chantiers de l’Atlantique of France.
- Fincantieri of Italy with:
  - Ancona shipyards (located at Ancona)
  - Marghera shipyards (located at Marghera, Venice)
  - Monfalcone shipyards (located at Monfalcone, Gorizia)
  - Sestri Ponente shipyards (located at Genoa)
  - VARD Brăila shipyards (located at Brăila)
  - VARD Søviknes Shipyard (located in Norway)
  - VARD Tulcea shipyards (located at Tulcea)
- Meyer Werft of Germany with two shipyards:
  - Meyer Turku at Perno shipyard in Turku, Finland
  - Meyer Werft of Germany.
- Mitsubishi Heavy Industries of Japan.

As of March 2024, 54 new ships have been ordered and are due to be delivered by 2028.

As of August 2024, there are 62 ships on order until 2036, adding 154,146 berths.

== Safety and security ==
=== Piracy ===
As most of the passengers on a cruise are affluent and have considerable ransom potential, not to mention a considerable amount of cash and jewelry on board (for example in casinos and shops), there have been several high-profile pirate attacks on cruise ships, such as on Seabourn Spirit and MSC Melody.

As a result, cruise ships have implemented various security measures. While most merchant shipping firms have generally avoided arming crew or security guards for reasons of safety, liability and conformity with the laws of the countries where they dock, cruise ships have small arms (usually semi-automatic pistols) stored in a safe accessible only by the captain who distributes them to authorized personnel such as security or the master-at-arms. The ship's high-pressure fire hoses can be used to keep boarders at bay, and often the vessel itself can be maneuvered to ram pirate craft. A recent technology to deter pirates has been the LRAD or sonic cannon which was used in the successful defence of Seabourn Spirit.

A related risk is that of terrorism, the most notable incident being that of the 1985 hijacking of Achille Lauro, an Italian cruise ship.

=== Crime on-board ===
Passengers entering the cruise ship are screened by metal detectors. Explosive detection machines used include X-ray machines and explosives trace-detection portal machines (a.k.a. "puffer machines"), to prevent weapons, drugs and other contraband on board. Security has been considerably tightened since 11 September 2001, such that these measures are similar to airport security.

In addition to security checkpoints, passengers are often given a ship-specific identification card, which must be shown in order to get on or off the ship. This prevents people boarding who are not entitled to do so, and also ensures the ship's crew are aware of who is on the ship. The Cruise Ship ID cards are also used as the passenger's room key. CCTV cameras are mounted frequently throughout the ship.

In 2010, the United States Congress passed the Cruise Vessel Security and Safety Act after numerous incidents of sexual violence, passenger disappearances, physical assault, and other serious crimes. Congress said:

Passengers on cruise vessels have an inadequate appreciation of their potential vulnerability to crime while on ocean voyages, and those who may be victimized lack the information they need to understand their legal rights or to know whom to contact for help in the immediate aftermath of the crime.

Congress said both passengers and crew committed crimes. It said data on the problem was lacking because cruise lines did not make it publicly available, multiple countries were involved in investigating incidents on international waters, and crime scenes could not be secured quickly by police. It recommended that owners of cruise vessels:

- install acoustic hailing and warning devices capable of working at a distance.
- install more security cameras
- install peep holes in passenger room doors
- limit access to passenger rooms to select staff at specific times

After investigating the death of Dianne Brimble in 2002, a coroner in Australia recommended:

- Federal police officers travel on ships to ensure a quick response to crime,
- scanners and drug detection dogs check passengers and crew at Australian ports,
- an end to overlaps between jurisdictions, and
- flags of ships be disregarded for nations unable to investigate incidents thoroughly and competently.

The lobby group International Cruise Victims Association, based in Arizona, pushes for more regulation of the cruise industry, and supports victims of crimes committed on cruise ships.

=== Overboard drownings ===
Passengers and crew sometimes drown after going overboard in what the industry calls man-overboard incidents (MOBs). From 2000 to 2018 more than 300 people fell off cruise ships or large ferries, which is an average of about 1.5 people each month. Of those, only about 17 to 25 percent were rescued. Critics of the industry blame alcohol promotion for many passenger deaths, and poor labour conditions for crew suicides. They also point to underinvestment in the latest MOB sensors, a lack of regulation and consumer protection, and a lack of on-board counselling services for crew. The industry blames irresponsible behaviour by passengers, and says overboard sensors are unreliable and generate false alarms.

Maritime lawyer Jim Walker estimates about half of all disappearances at sea involve some factor of foul play, and that a lack of police jurisdiction on international waters allows sexual predators to go unpunished.

=== Stability ===
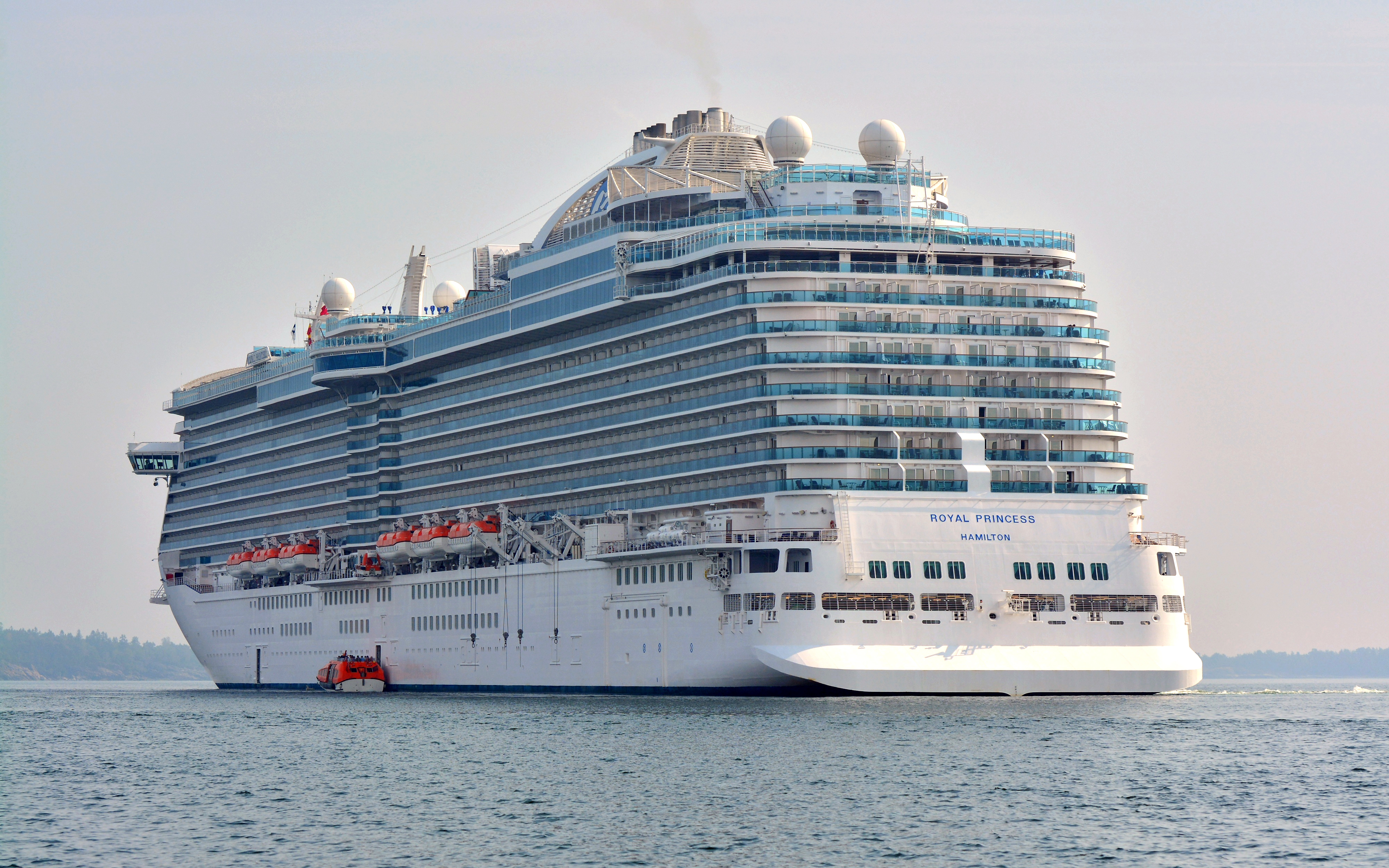
View of the stern of Royal Princess

Modern cruise ships are tall but remain stable due to their relatively low center of mass. This is due to large open spaces and the extensive use of aluminium, high-strength steel and other lightweight materials in the upper parts, and the fact that the heaviest components—engines, propellers, fuel tanks and such—are located at the bottom of the hull. Thus, even though modern cruise ships may appear tall, proper weight distribution ensures that they are not top-heavy. Furthermore, large cruise ships tend to be very wide, which considerably increases their initial stability by increasing the metacentric height.

A study by economic consultant G.P. Wild – commissioned by the cruise industry's trade group and released in March 2019 – argued that cruises are getting safer over time. The study claims that, even as capacity increased 55 percent between 2009 and 2018, the number of overall "operational incidents" declined 37 percent and the rate of man-overboard cases dropped 35 percent.

=== Health and disease issues ===
==== Norovirus ====
Norovirus is a virus that commonly causes gastroenteritis, and is also a cause of gastroenteritis on cruise ships. It is typically transmitted from person to person. Symptoms usually last between 1 and 3 days and generally resolve without treatment or long term consequences. The incubation period of the virus averages about 24 hours.

Norovirus outbreaks are often perceived to be associated with cruise ships. According to the United States CDC, the factors that cause norovirus to be associated with cruise ships include the closer tracking and faster reporting of illnesses on cruise ships compared to those on land; the closer living quarters that increases the amount of interpersonal contact; as well as the turnover of passengers that may bring the viruses on board.

However, the estimated likelihood of contracting gastroenteritis from any cause on an average 7-day cruise is less than 1%. In 2009, during which more than 13 million people took a cruise, there were nine reported norovirus outbreaks on cruise ships. Outbreak investigations by the United States Centers for Disease Control and Prevention (CDC) have shown that transmission among cruise ship passengers is primarily person-to-person; potable water supplies have not been implicated. In a study published in the Journal of the American Medical Association, the CDC reported that, "Perceptions that cruise ships can be luxury breeding grounds for acute gastroenteritis outbreaks don't hold water. A recent CDC report showed that from 2008 to 2014, only 0.18% of more than 73 million cruise passengers and 0.15% of some 28 million crew members reported symptoms of the illness."

Ships docked in port undergo surprise health inspections. In 2009, ships that underwent unannounced inspections by the CDC received an average CDC Vessel Sanitation Program score of approximately 97 out of a total possible 100 points. The minimum passing inspection score is 85. Collaboration with the CDC's Vessel Sanitation Program and the development of Outbreak Prevention and Response Plans has been credited in decreasing the incidence of norovirus outbreaks on ships.

==== Legionnaires' disease ====
Other pathogens which can colonise pools and spas including those on cruise ships include Legionella, the bacterium which causes Legionnaires' disease. Legionella, and in particular the most virulent strain, Legionella pneumophila serogroup 1, can cause infections when inhaled as an aerosol or aspirated. Individuals who are immunocompromised and those with pre-existing chronic respiratory and cardiac disease are more susceptible. Legionnaires' has been infrequently associated with cruise ships.

==== Enterotoxigenic Escherichia coli (ETEC) ====
Enterotoxigenic Escherichia coli is a form of E. coli and the leading bacterial cause of diarrhea in the developing world, as well as the most common cause of diarrhea for travelers to those areas. Since 2008 there has been at least one reported incident each year of E. coli on international cruise ships reported to the Vessel Sanitation Program of the Centers for Disease Control, though there were none in 2015. Causes of E. coli infection include the consumption of contaminated food or water contaminated by human waste.

==== COVID-19 ====
News outlets reported several cases and suspected cases of COVID-19 associated with cruise ships in early 2020. Authorities variously turned away ships or quarantined them; cruise operators cancelled some port visits and ultimately suspended global cruise operations. People aboard cruise ships played a role in spreading the disease in some countries.

== Environmental and social impact ==
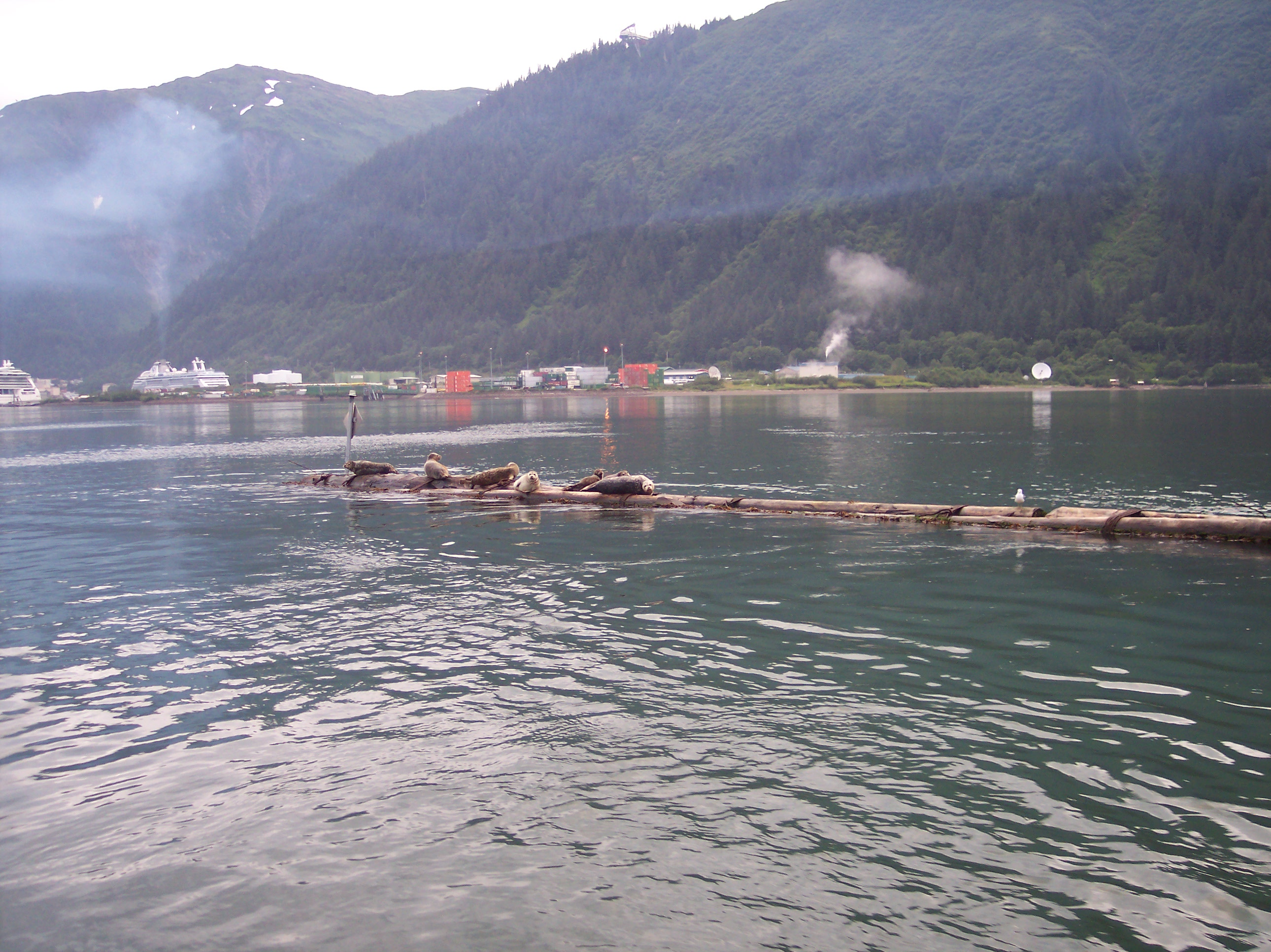
Smoke from cruise ships over Juneau, Alaska. In the foreground are harbor seals floating on the Douglas breakwater.

A 2019 study found that the levels of emitted particulate matter recorded on board pose a potential health danger to passengers.

Cruise ships generate a number of waste streams that can result in discharges to the marine environment, including sewage, graywater, hazardous wastes, oily bilge water, ballast water, and solid waste. They also emit air pollutants to the air and water. These wastes, if not properly treated and disposed of, can be a significant source of pathogens, nutrients, and toxic substances with the potential to threaten human health and damage aquatic life.

Most cruise ships run (primarily) on heavy fuel oil (HFO), or "bunker fuel", which, because of its high sulphur content, results in sulphur dioxide emissions worse than those of equivalent road traffic. The international MARPOL IV-14 agreement for Sulphur Emission Control Areas requires that cruise ships must use fuel containing no more than 0.10% sulphur or make use of exhaust gas scrubbers to reduce sulfur oxide emissions to no worse than an engine running on <0.1% sulfur fuel. Cruise ships may use 60 percent of the fuel energy for propulsion, and 40 percent for hotel loads (things other than propulsion), but demand and distribution depend highly on conditions.

It has been claimed that air pollution from maritime transport, including cruise ships, is responsible for 50,000 deaths per year in Europe.

Some cruise lines, such as Cunard, are taking steps to reduce environmental impact by refraining from discharges (Queen Mary 2 has a zero-discharge policy) and reducing their carbon dioxide output every year.

Cruise ships require electrical power, normally provided by diesel generators, although an increasing number of new ships are fueled by liquefied natural gas (LNG). When docked, a cruise ship must run her generators continuously to power on-board facilities, unless she is capable of using shore power, shore power is available, and it is convenient to switch to it. Some cruise ships already support the use of shore power, while others are being adapted to do so.

Large cruise ships have been identified as one of the major causes of overtourism in places like Venice, Barcelona, and Dubrovnik.

== Sunken vessels ==
Examples of Sunken Cruise Ships
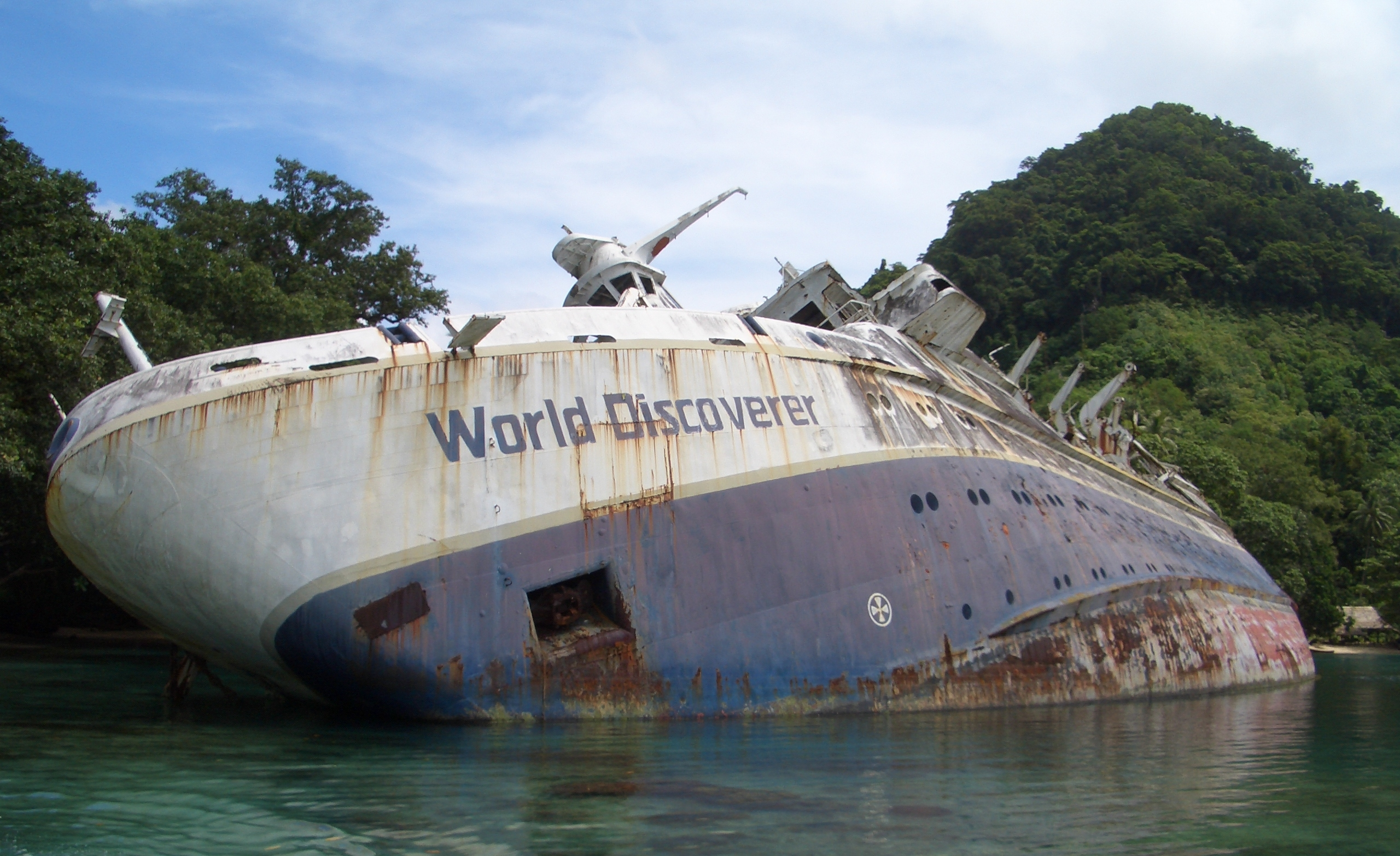
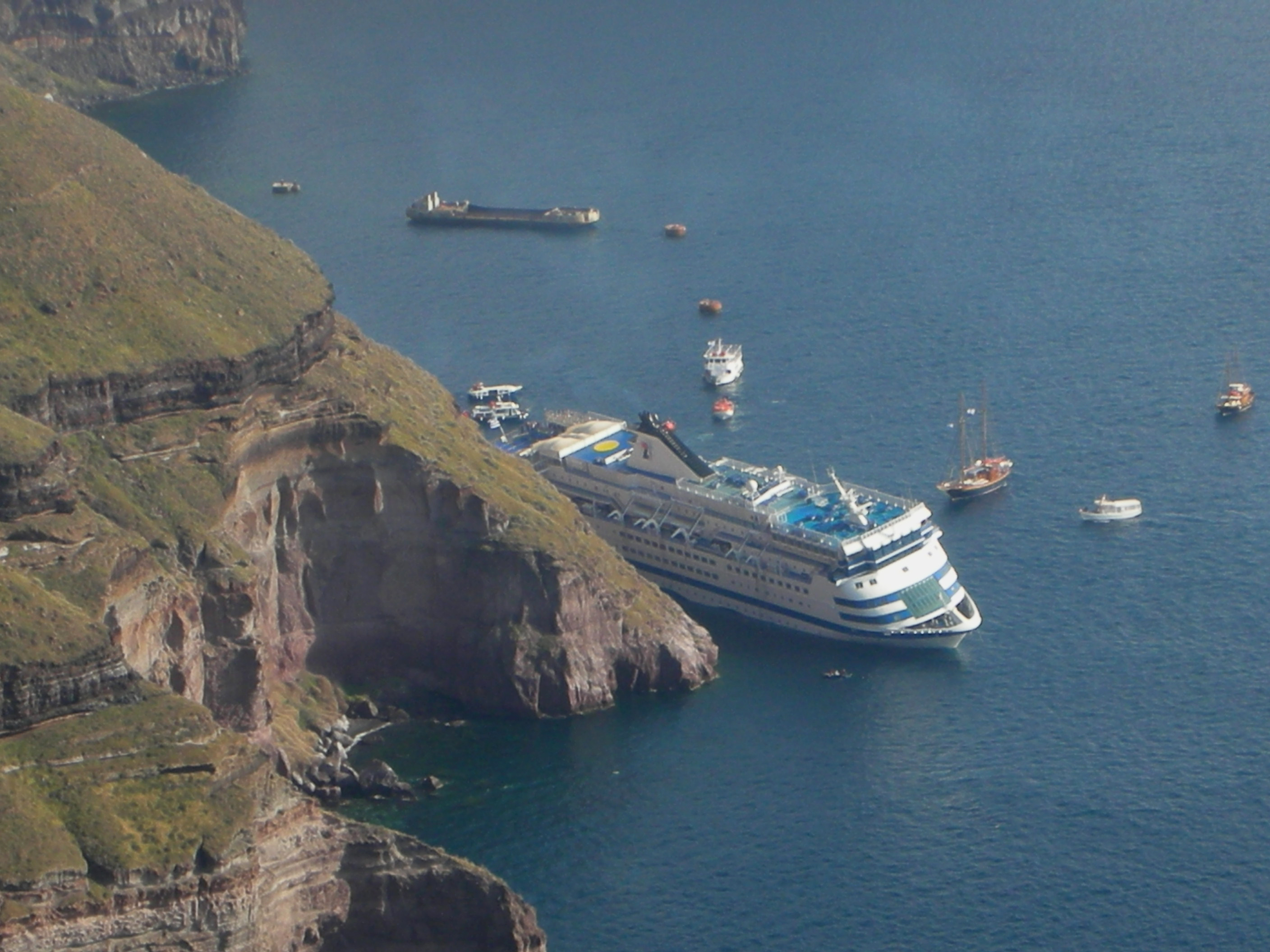
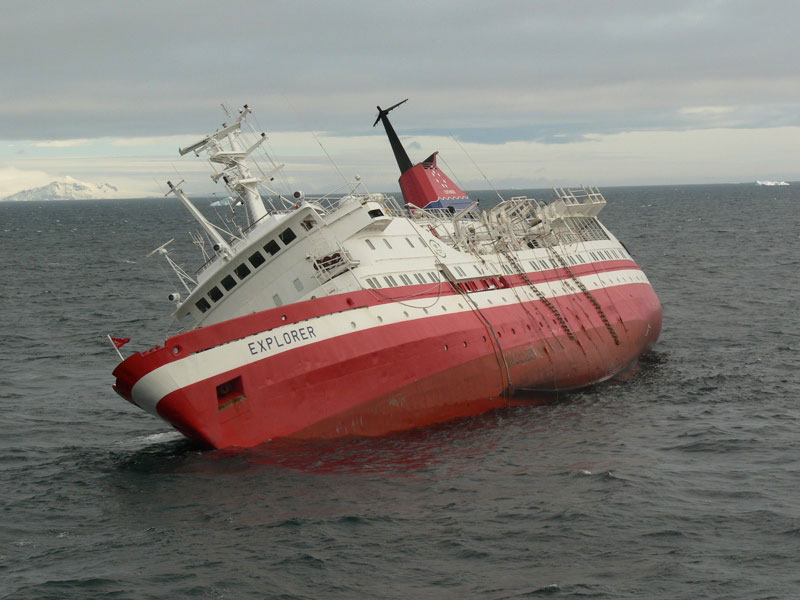
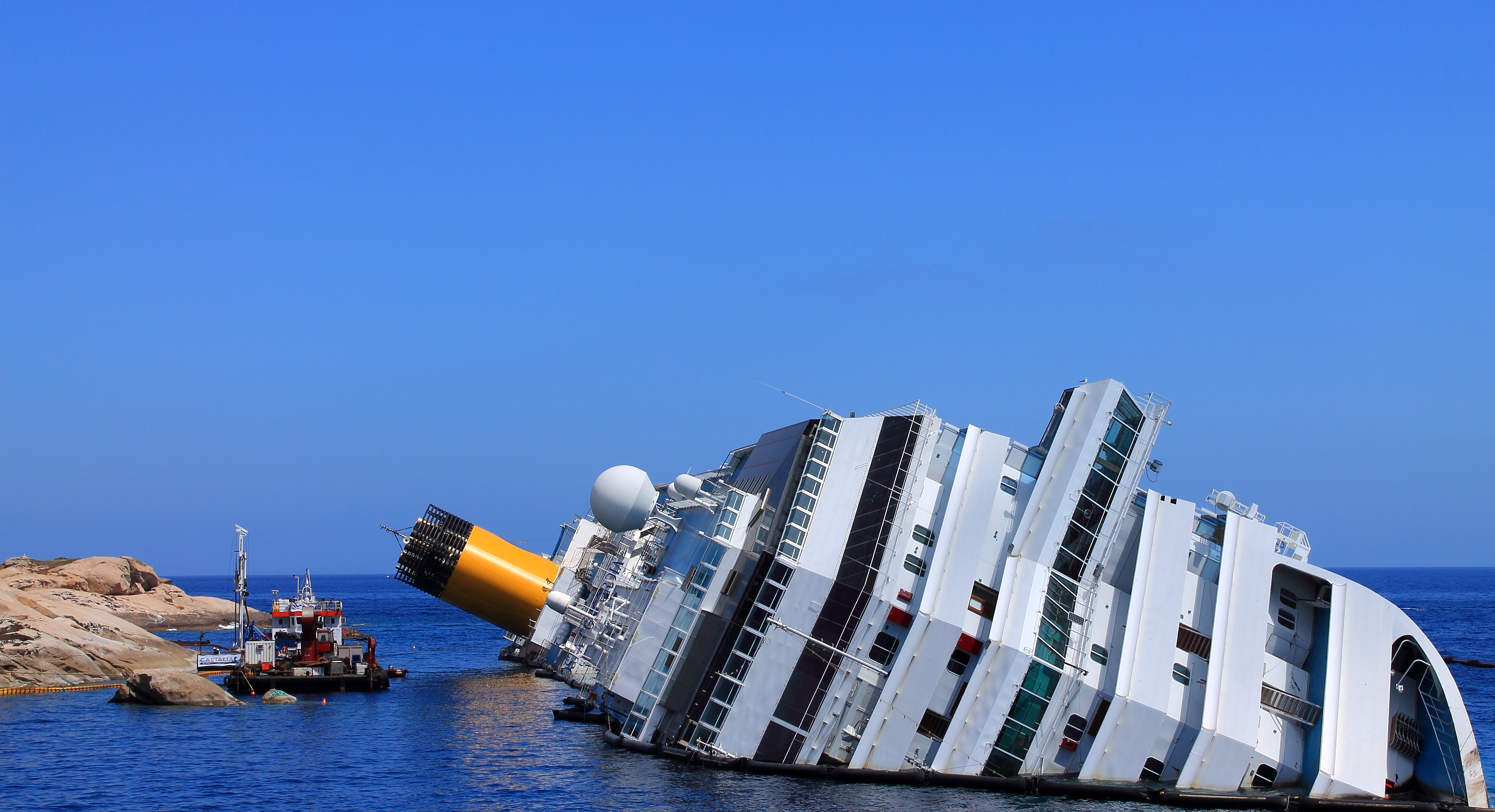
Images in Order of Appearance: World Discoverer, Sea Diamond, Explorer and Costa Concordia
- Bianca C.: caught fire and sank on 24 October 1961, one dead.
- Prinsendam: caught fire and sank on 11 October 1980, with no fatalities.
- Mikhail Lermontov: accidentally hit a rock 16 February 1986, one dead.
- Jupiter: sank on 21 October 1988 after accidentally colliding with the cargo ship Adige, 4 dead.
- Oceanos: accidentally sunk on 4 August 1991 after suffering uncontrolled flooding, no fatalities.
- Achille Lauro: caught fire and sank 30 November 1994, two dead.
- Galileo Galilei: caught fire and sank on 21 May 1999, with no fatalities.
- World Discoverer: accidentally hit a reef on 30 April 2000, no fatalities.
- Monterey: sank en route to the scrapyard on 21 October 2000, with no fatalities.
- Federico C.: sank on 17 December 2000 due to possible sabotage, with no fatalities.
- Sea Diamond: accidentally hit a reef and capsized on 6 April 2007, two dead.
- Explorer: accidentally sunk on 23 November 2007 after hitting an iceberg, no fatalities.
- Costa Concordia: sank accidentally on 13 January 2012 after hitting some rocks, 32 dead.
- Dongfang Zhi Xing: capsized and sank in a storm on 1 June 2015, killing 442 people.
- Hableány: a river cruise ship, sank on 29 May 2019 after accidentally colliding with the river cruise ship Viking Sigyn, 28 dead.
- Aurora: sank in the San Joaquin River Delta in May 2024 after taking on water, no fatalities.

== See also ==
- List of cruise ships
- List of largest cruise ships
- List of ocean liners
- River cruise
- Cruiseferry
- Lido
- List of busiest cruise ports by passengers
