= Cruise ship ID card =

Identification card for cruise ship passengers

A cruise ship ID card is a plastic card the size of a credit card that serves several functions for passengers on a cruise ship. Cruise ship ID cards are scanned at the entrances to the ship and at various points throughout the ship, either via magnetic strip, RFID readers or bar code in order to identify the passenger, allow entry to and exit off the ship, allow entry into certain areas of the ship, including the passenger's cabin, bill purchases to the passenger, and various other functions.

== Information printed on card ==
The information printed on the ship card may include:

- Name of cruise company
- Name of ship
- Dates of voyage
- Name of passenger
- Dining assignment
- Muster station

It is now rare for a picture of the passenger to be displayed on the card, but it is frequently scanned in the presence of a computer that will display a picture of the passenger on the screen.

== Functions ==
Functions of a ship card may include:

- Access to ship (boarding and disembarkation at ports) — required by security at many ports to enter port, and required to exit ship
- Cabin door key
- Onboard charge account — since most cruise lines use a cashless system on board, the card is used to make purchases on the ship that are billed to the passenger at the end of the voyage
- Basic passenger information
