= High Seas Rally =

The High Seas Rally is a motorcycle rally-themed cruise. The event was created by Dean and Debbie Anderson in 2001, and was later purchased by American company Entertainment Cruise Productions, which also produces Star Trek and other themed cruises. Individuals' motorcycles are not brought on board, but some motorcycles are on display during the cruise, and rentals at ports of call can arranged as part of the cruise.

During the cruise, vendors provide technical seminars, and give away prize motorcycles.

== See also ==
- Music cruise
