= Go-Ahead Group =

Public transport company

The Go-Ahead Group Limited
- Formerly: Go-Ahead Northern Limited (1987–1994); The Go-Ahead Group Plc (1994–2022)
- Type: Subsidiary; Private Limited Company
- ISIN: GB0003753778
- Industry: Public transport
- Founded: 17 February 1987; 39 years ago
- Headquarters: Newcastle upon Tyne, England
- Area served: United Kingdom; Ireland; Australia; Singapore; Norway; Sweden
- Key people: Miguel Parras (Group Chief Executive)
- Products: Bus and rail services
- Revenue: ▲£4,058.5 million (2021)
- Operating income: ▲£115.5 million (2021)
- Net income: ▲£(40.7) million (2021)
- Number of employees: 30,573 (2021)
- Parent: Kinetic Group (51%); Globalvia (49%)
- Website: go-ahead.com

The Go-Ahead Group Limited is a multi-national transport group based in Newcastle upon Tyne, England. While the majority of its operations are within Great Britain, it also operates services in Ireland, Australia, Singapore, and Norway. Go-Ahead was formerly listed on the London Stock Exchange prior to being purchased by Kinetic Group and Globalvia by 2022.

The Go-Ahead Group was originally founded in February 1987 as Go-Ahead Northern Limited as part of the wider privatisation of the National Bus Company. Early expansion centred around the acquisition of several smaller competing bus operators in North East England and operating as a subcontractor to National Express; during the early 1990s, the Brighton & Hove, Oxford Bus Company, and London Central were all acquired. During May 1994, Go-Ahead was floated on the London Stock Exchange.

In October 1996, Go-Ahead entered the UK railway sector via the operation of the Thames Trains franchise. Via the Govia joint venture, it bid for additional rail franchises in Britain, securing the Thameslink and later the Southeastern and London Midland operations.

In the late 1990s and early 2000s, Go-Ahead diversified into ground handling services at various British airports via the acquisition of Gatwick Handling International, British Midland, and Reed Aviation. During 2010, Go-Ahead disposed of its airport-based operations, the majority being sold to Dnata UK and Servisair. During the early 2010s, Go-Ahead acquired numerous other British transport companies.

During late 2015, it was contracted to operate bus and rail services in Germany and Singapore; in subsequent years, Go-Ahead also expanded into Ireland and Norway. On 28 September 2021, Britain's Department for Transport terminated Go-Ahead's Southeastern franchise after the discovery of financial misconduct. During August 2022, a consortium of Australia's Kinetic Group (51%) and Spain's Globalvia (49%) took over Go-Ahead, having valued the company at £669 million. During January 2023, it was announced that Go-Ahead was expanding into the Australian market via the U-Go Mobility joint venture with the engineering company UGL.

== History ==
=== Incorporation ===
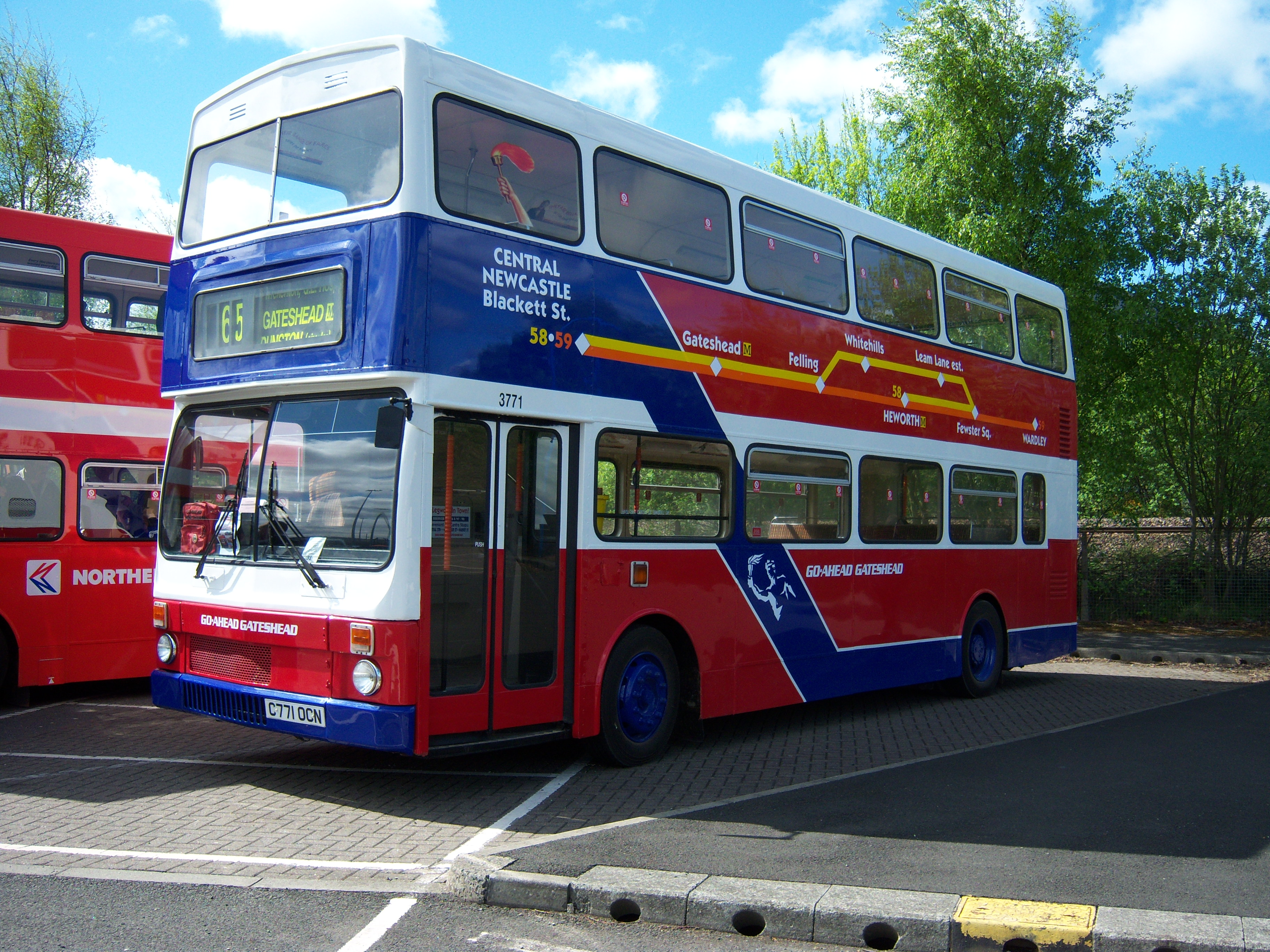
Preserved Go North East MCW Metrobus

The Go-Ahead Group was originally founded as Go-Ahead Northern Limited on 17 February 1987 as a consequence of the privatisation of the National Bus Company, during which a partial management buyout led by Martin Ballinger and Chris Moyes purchased its Gateshead-based northern division, known as the Northern General Transport Company. Early expansion of the company involved the acquisition of several smaller competing bus operators in North East England, such as Gypsy Queen in 1989 and Low Fell Coaches in June 1992. Go-Ahead Northern also became a subcontractor to National Express, operating services to the Midlands, North East, North West and South West England. Around the same time, Go-Ahead Leisure purchased a number of pubs, which were sold on during February 1996.

Despite bidding for a number of other larger bus operators in the intervening period, Go-Ahead's first major acquisition was Brighton & Hove in November 1993, followed by the Oxford Bus Company and Wycombe Bus Company in March 1994. In May 1997, the Brighton & Hove operation expanded with the acquisition of the former municipal operator Brighton Transport. During September 1999, Metrobus, a large operator operating in London, Surrey and Sussex was acquired.

==== Flotation and into London ====
Initially, Go-Ahead was structured as an unlisted public company and was owned 90 percent by its management. In May 1994, it was floated on the London Stock Exchange.

In October 1994, Go-Ahead purchased London Central during the privatisation of London Buses. In March 1995, OK Motor Services was purchased and integrated into the Go North East operation. In June 1996, a second London bus operation, London General, was acquired from the management team that had purchased it when privatised.

==== Airport services ====
In October 1998, Go-Ahead diversified with the acquisition of Gatwick Handling International, a provider of ground handling services at UK airports. Go-Ahead acquired the ground handling operations of British Midland and Midland Airport Services in March 2001, followed by Reed Aviation in August 2001. All these operations, including at Gatwick, all were rebranded as Aviance.

In May 2002, Go-Ahead diversified again, acquiring airport-focused Meteor Parking. Included in the purchase of Gatwick Handling International in 1998 was a 50% shareholding in Plane Handling, and in August 2004 Go-Ahead purchased the remaining 50% from Virgin Aviation. In December 2006 Gatwick Airport parking operator PAS was purchased and integrated into Meteor Parking, followed by security provider Nikaro in February 2007.

In January 2010, Go-Ahead disposed of most of its airport-based operations via a sale to Dnata UK and Servisair. In September 2010, Meteor Parking was sold to Vinci SA, bringing Go-Ahead's involvement in the aviation support industry to a close.

=== 1996–2010 ===
==== Entering the railway sector ====
In October 1996, Go-Ahead entered the UK rail market when it commenced operating the Thames Trains franchise, which it ran until March 2004. The franchise was awarded by the Director of Passenger Rail Franchising to Victory Rail Holdings; Go-Ahead owned 65% of the shares in Victory Rail Holdings with the remaining 35% held by some ex British Rail managers and employees. Go-Ahead bought the remaining shares it did not own in June 1998.

Also in 1996, Go-Ahead entered into the Govia joint venture with French company VIA-GTI (which later became Keolis), in order to bid for more UK rail franchises. Govia was 65% owned by Go-Ahead. Govia was awarded the Thameslink franchise, which it ran from March 1997 until March 2006.

During August 2001, Govia started running the South Central rail franchise. In October 2000, the Shadow Strategic Rail Authority awarded Govia the South Central rail franchise with operations due to commence in May 2003 when the Connex South Central franchise expired. Govia negotiated a deal with Connex to buy out the remainder of its franchise.

==== Failed takeover and operations in Sweden ====
During July 2000, French government owned Caisse des Dépts-Développement (C3D) submitted a bid to purchase Go-Ahead; this offer, which was valued at £326 million, was promptly rejected by the company. A hostile takeover bid was issued by C3D one month later; it was declared to be "unwelcome" by Go-Ahead chairman Sir Frederick Holliday. Go-Ahead pledged to fight for its independence and promoted its expansion plans to shareholders to persuade them to back the existing management team. C3D sought to integrate Go-Ahead with its Transdev S.A. bus and light rail operator. In October 2000, C3D's takeover effort came to nought.

Go-Ahead entered into two joint ventures with VIA-GTI and BK Tåg to operate rail services in Sweden. Go-Ahead had a 39% stake in City Pendeln AB which was to operate the Citypendeln commuter rail business in Stockholm. Go-Ahead also had a 29% stake in Sydvasten AB which operated rail services between Gothenburg and Malmö. Go-Ahead decided to exit from both ventures in May 2000.

Wycombe Bus Company was sold to Arriva in December 2000.

==== Expansion into the Midlands and the South ====
In August 2003, the Wilts & Dorset bus business was purchased. In June 2005 Solent Blue Line and Southern Vectis were purchased. In September 2005, the Lewes and Seaford operations of Stagecoach South were acquired and integrated into the Brighton & Hove business.

During December 2005, Go-Ahead purchased The Birmingham Coach Company, which operated express coaches under contract for National Express and local bus services in the West Midlands under the Diamond Bus name. Go-Ahead had been known for some time to be keen to begin operating in the area. In February 2006, another operator in the West Midlands, Probus Management, trading as People's Express, was purchased.

In August 2006, the Birmingham Coach Company (trading as Diamond Bus) and Probus operations were regrouped under the Go West Midlands Limited legal entity, with the bus operations branded as Diamond in the West Midlands. In February 2006, the Hants & Dorset Trim bus refurbishment business was purchased. In April 2006, the Govia joint venture commenced operating the South Eastern franchise as Southeastern.

During September 2006, Docklands Buses was acquired and integrated into Go-Ahead London, followed in October 2006 by Marchwood Motorways which was integrated into Go South Coast.

In June 2007, Blue Triangle was acquired and integrated into Go-Ahead London. In September 2007, Northumbria Coaches was purchased and integrated into Go North East, followed by Stanley Buses (the bus service subsidiary of Stanley Taxis) in October 2007, and Redby Buses in January 2008. In November 2007, Govia began operating the London Midland rail franchise. In December 2007, the Orpington services of First London were acquired.

In February 2008, Go-Ahead sold Go West Midlands to Rotala's Central Connect, two years after purchasing the company. In June 2008, the Gatwick Express rail service was incorporated into Southern. In October 2009, East Thames Buses was acquired and integrated into Go-Ahead London as well as the Horsham operations of Arriva Southern Counties that were integrated into Metrobus. In December 2009, Plymouth Citybus was purchased from Plymouth City Council. In March 2010, Konectbus in Norfolk was purchased as well as the Hexham operations of Arriva North East and integrated into Go North East.

==== American operations ====
In August 2010, Go-Ahead America, a joint venture with Cook Illinois in which Go-Ahead held a 50% stake, commenced operating a yellow school bus contract in St Louis, Missouri. In July 2014, Go-Ahead exited the United States following the loss of its yellow bus contract.

=== Since 2011 ===
==== Acquisitions ====
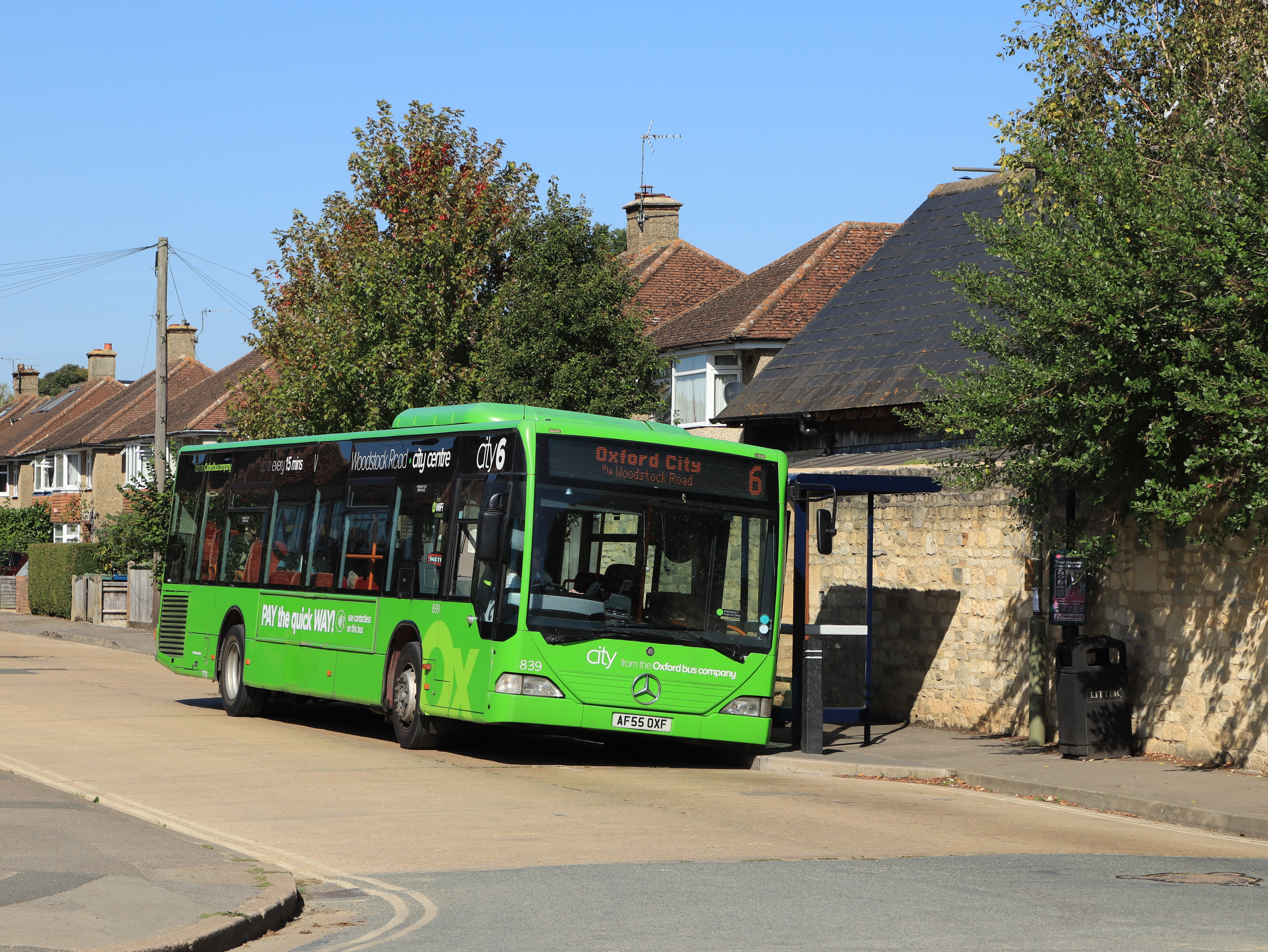
An Oxford Bus Company Mercedes Citaro in Wolvercote

In May 2011, Go-Ahead acquired Thames Travel in South Oxfordshire. Acquisitions in 2012 were Carousel Buses (March) integrated into Oxford Bus Company, Essex-based Hedingham (March), the Northumberland Park-based operations of First London (March), Anglian Bus (April) in Norfolk and Suffolk, and HC Chambers & Son, Suffolk (June) (immediately operationally merged with Hedingham).

In March 2012, the Department for Transport announced that Go-Ahead, along with Abellio, FirstGroup, MTR, and Stagecoach, had been shortlisted for the newly created Thameslink, Southern & Great Northern franchise. During May 2014, Govia was awarded the new franchise. This franchise is unusual as a management contract where fare income does not go to GTR, which is simply paid a fee for operating the service, so GTR carries less revenue risk. This form of franchise was chosen because of long-term engineering works anticipated around London, which would be a significant challenge to organise within the normal form of franchise.

==== Expansion into Europe and Singapore ====
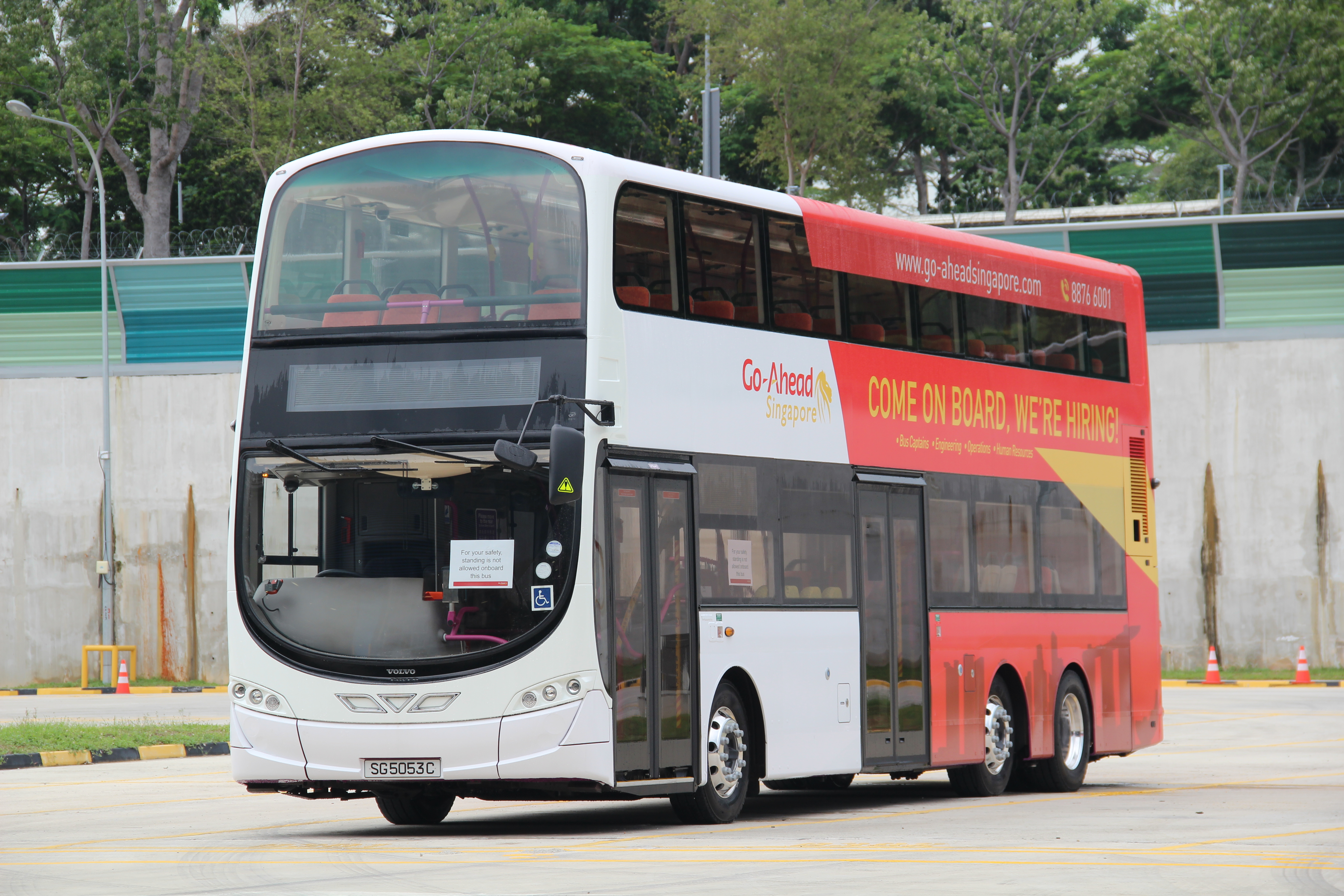
Volvo B9TL in Singapore in June 2016

During November 2015, Go-Ahead Singapore was awarded a contract to operate 25 bus services in Singapore previously operated by SBS Transit out of Loyang Bus Depot, which commenced on 4 September 2016. In the same month, Go-Ahead Germany were awarded two rail contracts in Stuttgart, Germany. The contracts commenced in 2019–2020.

In August 2017, Go-Ahead won a tender to run 24 routes in Ireland previously operated by Dublin Bus. Go-Ahead Ireland commenced the contract with the National Transport Authority to operate these routes on 9 September 2018. In June 2018, East Yorkshire Motor Services was purchased with over 300 buses. In January 2019, Go-Ahead Ireland commenced operating a further six routes between Dublin and its outlying commuter towns, previously operated by Bus Éireann. By 2022, the National Transport Authority indicated that it was not satisfied with Go-Ahead's performance, but extended the contract to October 2024 on the basis that it would be too disruptive to bus services to re-tender the contract. Go-Ahead has been penalised by the National Transport Authority for failing to meet minimum performance standards in 2019, 2021, 2022, 2023 and 2024.

During October 2018, Go-Ahead won a tender to run the Oslo south package, consisting of three routes previously operated by NSB. Go-Ahead Nordic commenced the contract with the Norwegian Railway Directorate to operate these routes in December 2019.

==== Manchester and Cornwall ====
In February 2019, Go-Ahead announced it would buy First Greater Manchester's Cheetham Hill depot with 163 buses and brand it Go North West.

During March 2020, Go Cornwall Bus (Cornish: Kewgh Kyttrin Kernow) partnered with Cornwall Council (Cornish: Konsel Kernow) and local operators to form a new Transport for Cornwall brand (Cornish: Karyans rag Kernow), with plans calling for an additional 130 vehicles.

==== Termination of Southeastern rail franchise ====
On 28 September 2021, the Department for Transport announced it would terminate the Southeastern franchise the following month after the discovery of financial misconduct. Southeastern had not declared over £25 million that should have been repaid to the government in the period since 2014. Go-Ahead's Chief Financial Officer resigned over this matter.

On 9 December 2021, the company announced that its auditors needed more time to consider the implications of the misconduct and potential fines from the Department for Transport (DfT). Consequently, the annual results would not be ready at the end of the company's financial year on 2 January 2022, which would oblige the company to request suspension of trading in its shares. The share price fell by about 15% on the day of the announcement.

On 24 February 2022, Go-Ahead published their delayed 2020–21 results, and announced the outcome of investigations into the termination of the franchise. The review found that "serious errors had been made” since 2006, with the expected cost to the company to be over £80 million. The amount owed to the DfT was increased to £51.3 million, with errors dating back to 2006. Go-Ahead also stated that they expect to have to pay a fine to the DfT, setting aside up to £30 million for this. Go-Ahead also stated that they may also owe DfT an additional £21.3 million, related to a dispute over profit sharing.

==== Takeover ====
On 13 June 2022, a consortium of Australia's Kinetic Group (51%) and Spain's Globalvia (49%) launched a takeover bid of Go-Ahead, initially valuing the company at £647 million. Two months later, the offer was increased to £669 million. Shortly thereafter, 78.6% of Go-Ahead's shareholders voted to accept the offer.

==== Expansion and changes ====
During January 2023, it was announced that Go-Ahead was expanding into the Australian market via the U-Go Mobility joint venture with the engineering company UFL; this venture had been recently awarded a contract by Transport New South Wales to operate buses in Sydney. In June 2023, Go-Ahead bought Pulhams Coaches, expanding its presence into the Cotswolds.

In mid 2023, Go-Ahead Group announced that it was procuring a new fleet of hydrogen fuel cell buses to serve routes around Gatwick Airport, Crawley, and Horley; comprising 54 vehicles, it will be one of the largest hydrogen bus fleets present in the UK. The company has also invested £30 million on establishing a liquid hydrogen refuelling station, the first such facility serving buses in Europe.

==== Sale of German rail division ====
On 12 October 2023, the company entered into an agreement to sell Go-Ahead Germany to ÖBB; the sales process was completed on 1 February 2024, after approvals have been obtained from various international authorities under competition law.

==== Stockholm Metro ====
In January 2024, Connecting Stockholm, which is majority-owned by Go-Ahead (55%) was awarded the operation contract for the Stockholm Metro system. The contract will be worth approximately SEK 40 billion over its 11 year period and commenced in November 2025, taking over from MTR.

==== West Yorkshire ====
In January 2025, Proctors Coaches was awarded the operation contract by West Yorkshire Metro for the 571 service linking Halifax, West Yorkshire, Brighouse and Shelf, West Yorkshire commencing the start of the Go-Ahead West Yorkshire operation. In July 2025, the operation expanded from the acquisition of services 112/112A linking Batley and Ossett as well as service 213 linking Dewsbury, Batley and Morley, West Yorkshire. Following the withdrawal of services X98/X99 by Transdev Blazefield, Go Ahead West Yorkshire acquired both services under the Proctors Coaches trading name while utilising the Go-Ahead West Yorkshire brand.

== Operations ==
The company's operations include:

=== Bus operations ===
United Kingdom

- Brighton & Hove – bus operations in Brighton and Hove, acquired in November 1993
  - Metrobus – bus operations in Crawley, acquired in September 1999, London operations brought under the control of Go-Ahead London in April 2014
  - Eastbourne Sightseeing – city sightseeing bus operations in Eastbourne, acquired in February 2024
- Go-Ahead London
  - Blue Triangle – bus operations in east London, acquired on 29 June 2007
  - Docklands Buses – bus operations in east London, acquired in September 2006
  - Fastrack – bus rapid transit operations in Kent Thameside, acquired in November 2024
    - Kent Country – bus operations in Kent Thameside, started in October 2025
  - London Central – bus operations in south London, acquired in October 1994
  - London General – bus operations in London, acquired in June 1996
  - Metrobus – bus operations in south-east London, acquired on 1 April 2014
- Go North East – bus operations in North East England and the founding company of the Go-Ahead Group in 1987
- East Yorkshire – bus operations in Yorkshire and the Humber, acquired in June 2018
  - Procters Coaches – coach operations in North Yorkshire, acquired in May 2024
  - Compass Royston – coach operations in Stockton-on-Tees, Middlesbrough and Teesside, acquired in May 2024
  - Esk Valley – coach operations in North Yorkshire and East Riding of Yorkshire, acquired in May 2024
  - Fourway Coaches – coach operations in West Yorkshire, acquired in May 2024
    - Go-Ahead West Yorkshire – bus operations in Kirklees and Leeds, started in February 2025
  - Morse Coaches – coach operations in Sheriff Hutton, acquired in December 2025
- Go North West – bus operations in Greater Manchester, acquired in February 2019
- Go South Coast
  - Bluestar – bus operations in Eastleigh, Hythe and Southampton, acquired in July 2005
    - Unilink – Southampton University bus services for students and public, acquired on 29 September 2008
  - Damory – bus and coach operations in Dorset, acquired in August 2003
  - Excelsior – coach operations in Bournemouth, acquired in October 2016
  - Morebus – bus operations in Bournemouth and Poole (previously Wilts & Dorset), acquired in August 2003
    - Unibus – Bournemouth University and Arts University Bournemouth bus services for students and public
  - Salisbury Reds – bus operation in Salisbury and Wiltshire (previously Wilts & Dorset), acquired in August 2003
  - Southern Vectis – bus operations on the Isle of Wight, acquired in July 2005
  - Swindon's Bus Company – bus operations in Swindon (previously Thamesdown Transport), acquired in February 2017
  - Tourist Coaches – coach operations in Wiltshire, acquired in August 2003
- Go South West
  - Dartline Coaches – bus & coach operations in Exeter, acquired in October 2022
    - Truronian – coach operations in Cornwall, acquired in February 2026
  - Plymouth Citybus – bus operations in Plymouth, acquired in November 2009
  - Go Cornwall Bus – bus operations in Cornwall, acquired in December 2014
- Go Thames Valley
  - Oxford Bus Company – bus operations in Oxford, acquired in March 1994
    - Tom Tappin – city sightseeing bus operations in Oxford, acquired in December 2017
  - Thames Travel – bus operations in South Oxfordshire and Berkshire, acquired in May 2011
    - Pearces Coaches – coach operations in Oxfordshire, acquired in March 2025
  - Carousel Buses – bus operations in High Wycombe and Buckinghamshire, acquired in March 2012
    - BoroughBus – bus operations in Windsor and Maidenhead, started in April 2025
  - Pulhams Coaches – bus & coach operations in West Oxfordshire, Cheltenham, Gloucestershire and the Cotswolds, acquired in June 2023
    - Swanbrook Transport – coach operations in Cheltenham, acquired in November 2024

Singapore

- Go-Ahead Singapore – bus operations in Singapore, commenced operations in Loyang and the Tampines area in September 2016 and July 2026 respectively

Ireland

- Go-Ahead Ireland – tendered out bus services in Dublin

Sweden

- Go-Ahead Sweden – since April 2022, Go-Ahead has operated in southern Sweden, after taking ownership of Flexbuss Sverige AB. In February 2025, they also acquired Trossö Buss

Australia

- U-Go Mobility – a 50:50 joint venture between Go-Ahead and UGL in Sydney that commenced in July 2023.

=== Current rail operations ===
The company operates the following UK rail concession as part of joint ventures:

- Elizabeth line – operated since May 2025 as part of GTS Rail Operations, a joint venture with Tokyo Metro and Sumitomo Corporation

The company also operates railway lines internationally:

- Go-Ahead Nordic – operating the Oslo South package on the Arendal, Jæren and Sørlandet Lines
- Go Ahead Sverige – operating the Stockholm metro since November 2025 through the joint-venture Connecting Stockholm.

=== Previous rail operations ===
- Thames Trains – Rail franchise from October 1996 to March 2004
- Thameslink – Rail franchise from March 1997 to March 2006 (through the Govia joint venture with Keolis)
- London Midland – Rail franchise from November 2007 to December 2017 (Govia)
- Southeastern – Rail franchise from April 2006 to October 2021 (Govia). Govia was stripped of the franchise after a serious financial breach of the agreement
- Govia Thameslink Railway – operated from September 2014 until May 2026, a joint venture with Keolis. This franchise also included the Gatwick Express brand

=== Previous subsidiaries ===
- Go-Ahead Germany – operated rail services in Baden-Württemberg and Bavaria, sold to ÖBB on 1 February 2024
- Go East Anglia – operated bus services in Norfolk, Essex & Suffolk, sold to Transport Made Simple on 1 October 2025
  - Konectbus – bus operations in Norfolk, acquired in March 2010
  - Hedingham & Chambers – bus operations in Essex & Suffolk, merged from two former operators in 2012
- Southdown Buses – operated bus services in East Surrey and Kent, acquired on 1 February 2023, operations transferred to Metrobus on 2 September 2023
