= Laker Airways =

1966–1982 private British airline

IATA	ICAO	Call sign
GK	LKR	LAKER
- Founded: 29 July 1966; 60 years ago
- Ceased operations: 5 February 1982; 44 years ago
- Hubs: London–Gatwick; Berlin–Tegel
- Secondary hubs: Manchester
- Focus cities: Glasgow–Prestwick
- Subsidiaries: [International] Caribbean Airways (part-owned); Laker Air Travel; Arrowsmith Holidays; Laker Holidays
- Fleet size: 20 aircraft (14 widebodies and six narrowbodies) at 5 February 1982
- Destinations: Europe/North America/Asia
- Headquarters: Gatwick Airport
- Key people: Freddie Laker, Alan Hellary

Laker Airways Limited was a British airline founded by Freddie Laker in 1966. It was originally a charter airline flying passengers and cargo worldwide. Its head office was located at Gatwick Airport in Crawley, England.

It became the second long-haul, low-cost airline in September 1977, operating low-fare scheduled services between London Gatwick and New York (after pioneering Icelandic low-cost carrier Loftleiðir). In the early 1980s, the company went into bankruptcy during the recession, operating its last flight on 5 February 1982.

== Early history ==
Freddie Laker announced the creation of Laker Airways in February 1966. The airline had been formally registered on the 8th of the month and commenced operations from its Gatwick Airport base on the following 29 July with two Bristol Britannia 102 series turboprops, initially operating on Air France behalf. The aircraft's livery was a combination of black, red and white – an adaptation of Laker's racing colours. The Britannias were supplemented and eventually replaced by five BAC One-Eleven 300 short-haul jet aircraft from December 1967. This included an initial 1966 order with the manufacturer for three aircraft valued at £4 million.

Laker spent more than £200,000 of his own money on the newly-ordered aircraft's deposits, with a consortium of City banks led by Clydesdale Bank funding the remainder. He placed a follow-up order for a fourth aircraft to be delivered in 1968 and acquired a former-British Eagle aircraft from Bahamas Airways in 1971. These airline's short- and medium-haul charter operations to holiday resorts in the Mediterranean and the Canary Islands were primarily operated with these aircraft.

== Operational history ==
Laker Airways offered 30% discounts to tour operators to charter the airline's aircraft during the winter, when demand was lower, and implemented other promotions to incentivise longer-term use of the aircraft by tour operators. This ensured that the fleet was in use for almost the entire year.

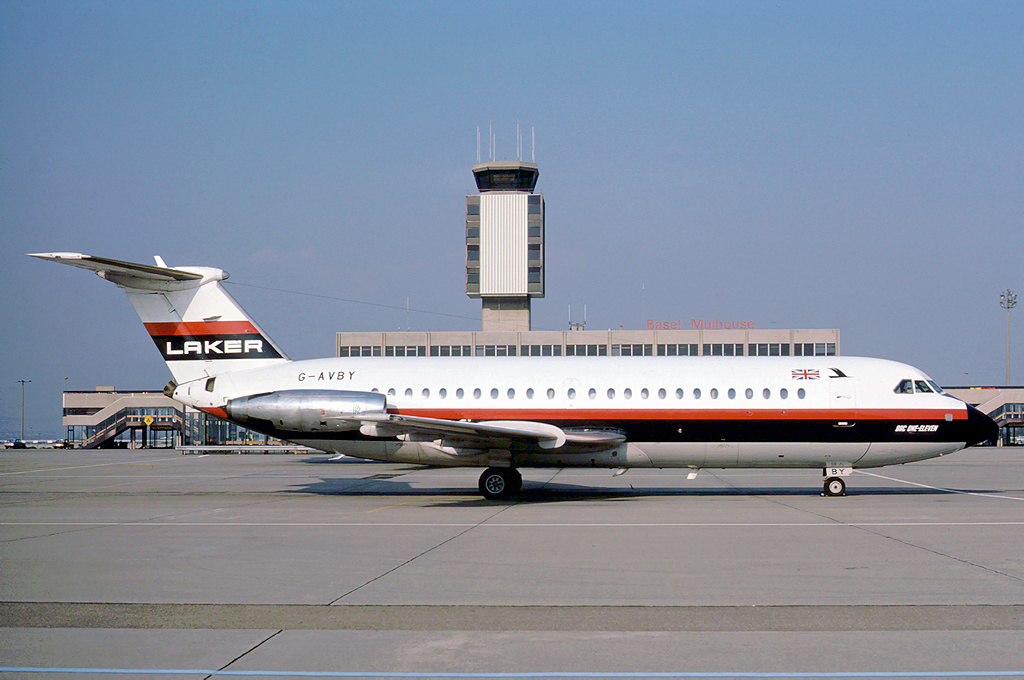
BAC One-Eleven in 1977

August 1968 saw the establishment of its first overseas base at Tegel Airport in what was then West Berlin. The company had up to three BAC One-Elevens stationed there until 1981, when these aircraft were replaced with one of its three newly acquired Airbus A300 B4 series wide-bodies, at the time the largest aircraft operated out of any Berlin airport.

Its Berlin operation was staffed by ninety, mainly local, workers. Throughout this period, it carried thousands of holidaymakers from the Western parts of the then divided German capital to resorts in the Mediterranean and the Canary Islands.

=== Ground handling ===
In 1972, Laker Airways co-founded Gatwick Handling, a Gatwick handling agent that has become part of the Aviance group, with Dan-Air. Each airline owned 50% of Gatwick Handling at its inception.

==== Climbing speed ====
In the days when airports and air space were relatively uncongested, Laker Airways instructed departing One-Eleven crews to tune into other jet aircraft taking off ahead of them, and to begin a conversation with the other aircraft's crew while continuing their climb. The aim was to obtain information about the other aircraft's altitude to encourage that aircraft's crew to climb to their upper cruising altitude as quickly as possible so that Laker's One-Elevens could attain their optimum height in the shortest possible time. This helped Laker's One-Elevens climb faster without using as much power, helping the company to reduce fuel consumption and reduce the engines' wear and tear.

==== Weight-saving ====
Among the weight-saving measures Laker Airways used to make its aircraft fly further without the need of refuelling was a baggage allowance limit of 40 lb (18 kg) rather less than the more usual 44 lb (20 kg), and carrying fewer passengers than the aircraft could hold. This policy was first employed when the airline began operating its BAC One-Elevens. By limiting the free baggage allowance and restricting passengers, the company used the weight saved to carry additional fuel, increasing range.

This was sufficient to permit non-stop flights from London Gatwick or Berlin Tegel to Tenerife (Note: at the time the most popular resort in the Canary Islands for British and German tourists) at least in one direction, depending on the direction and strength of the winds. This helped make Laker's One-Elevens more competitive with larger, longer-range aircraft operated by rivals, especially for tour operators struggling to fill a bigger aircraft profitably. If the passenger load was greater than 70, the charterer paid for any stops, encouraging operators to keep to 70 passengers.

Alternatively, weight saved as a result of limiting free baggage could be traded for reduced fuel consumption on shorter routes well within the BAC One-Eleven's range by making the aircraft lighter, even with a full load of passengers. (Note: accommodating up to 89 at a seat pitch of 29 inches (74 cm))

==== Introduction of DC-10 aircraft ====
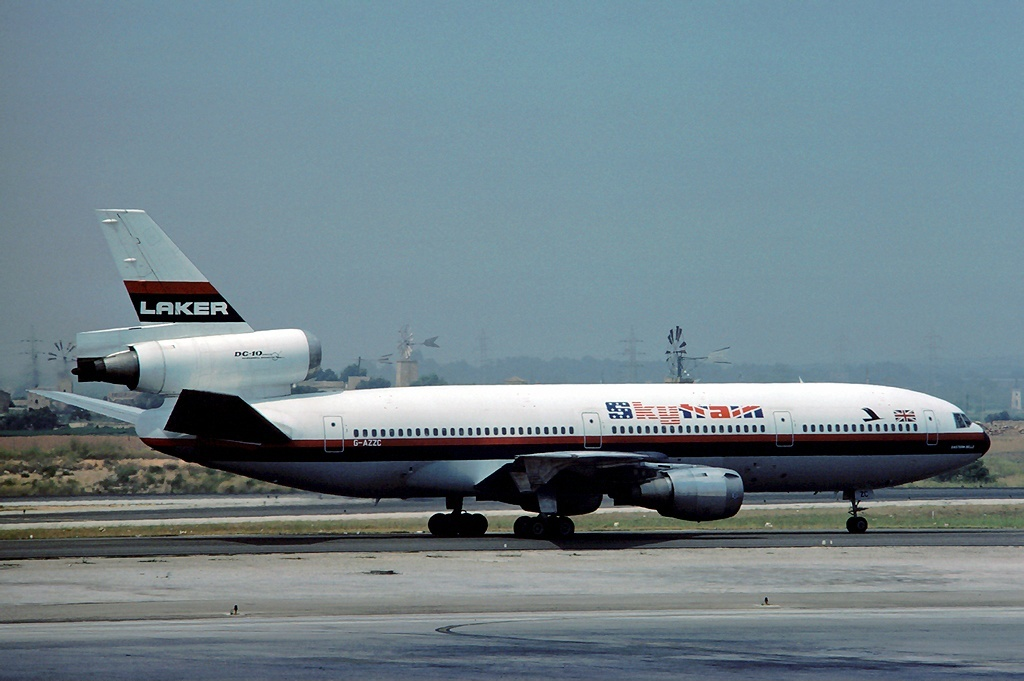
McDonnell Douglas DC-10-10 in 1976

Weight-saving measures adopted to boost the BAC One-Eleven's range stood Laker Airways in good stead when the airline introduced the McDonnell Douglas DC-10-10.

This model lacked the range of the DC-10-30. The DC-10-10 was optimised for medium-haul routes. The aircraft McDonnell Douglas was offering had been built against an order placed by Mitsui Group, for five aircraft, who intended to lease them to All Nippon Airways (ANA). But, instead, ANA decided to order the Lockheed L-1011 Tristar. Before offering, on behalf of Mitsui, the aircraft to Laker, McDonnell Douglas had asked British Caledonian (BCal) whether it was interested. BCal was looking for a widebody replacement for its ageing Boeing 707s and Vickers VC10s. BCal rejected this offer because the aircraft had insufficient range to fly non-stop from Gatwick to the distant points on its network.

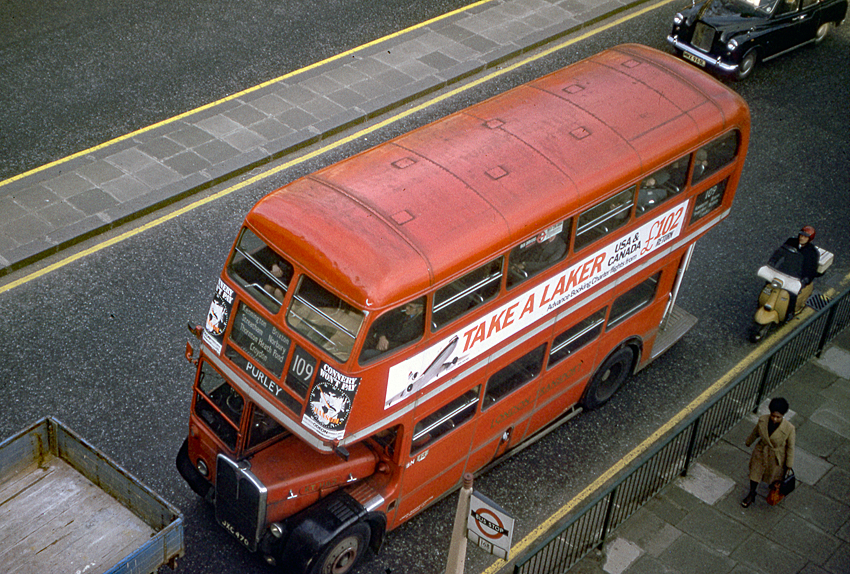
London Transport bus with Laker Airways advert in 1975

Despite these drawbacks, Laker Airways took two of those five Mitsui (originally intended for ANA) ordered aircraft. The three remaining Mitsui aircraft went to Turkish Airlines. One of these later crashed as Turkish Airlines Flight 981. The airline concluded it could fly non-stop from the UK to any point east of the Rockies by keeping the baggage limit at 40 lb (18 kg) and reducing single-class seating from 380 (Note: ten abreast) to 345. (Note: nine abreast) The saving could be used to carry more fuel. The calculations had shown that even with reduced seating, it had to fill only 52% of the seats to break even. Moreover, Laker Airways had figured that the aircraft's low break-even seat factor would enable it to operate its proposed London – New York Skytrain with a lower break-even factor compared to the Boeing 707, an ageing narrow-bodied aircraft whose costs were higher per passenger. The DC-10s also had huge potential to boost the projected profitability of Skytrain. Revised estimates anticipated an average load factor of 70–75% and raised the traffic forecast for the first year of operation to 250,000 passengers each way. This was almost three times the original 707-based forecast. These factors swung the firm in favour of McDonnell-Douglas's offer.

A Laker Airways McDonnell Douglas DC-10 series 10 was one of four widebodies that were specially flown in for the pre-inauguration of the then-new terminal building at Berlin's Tegel Airport on 23 October 1974. (A British Airways (BA) Lockheed L-1011 Tristar 1, a Pan Am Boeing 747-100 and an Air France Airbus A300 B2 were the other widebodies specially flown in on that day to mark this occasion.)

=== Introduction of Skytrain ===
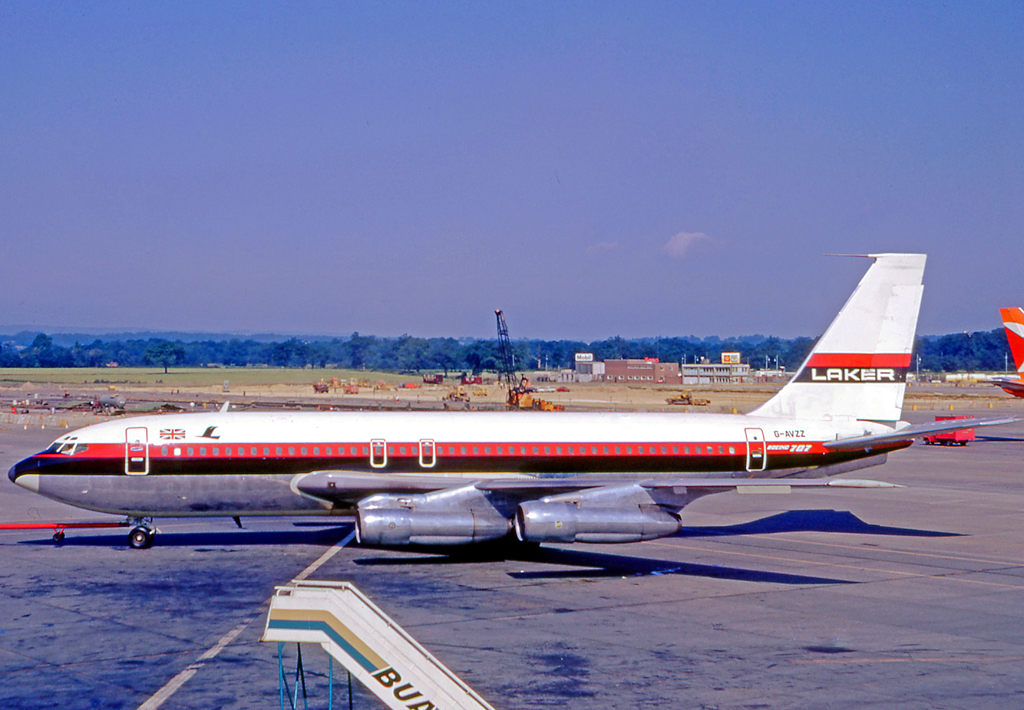
Boeing 707-138B in 1970

The early 1970s saw the airline and its owner battle with aviation authorities in the UK and US to gain approval for a low-cost, "no frills" transatlantic service to link London and New York daily during the peak summer period from May to September and four times a week during the remainder of the year. This was to be marketed as Skytrain for £32.50 one-way in winter and £37.50 in summer. Two Boeing 707-138Bs were acquired from the administrators of British Eagle in 1969. Both were operated by Qantas when new.

They were subsequently purchased by Kleinwort Benson, which had leased them to British Eagle until its demise in November 1968. These aircraft were earmarked for Skytrain. Laker's original Skytrain application assumed a 62.9% break-even load factor. This meant that the airline needed to sell 100 out of 158 seats at a single fare of £37.50 per seat on each flight to start making money with Skytrain. Sir Freddie announced Skytrain at a press conference at London's Savoy Hotel on 30 June 1971.

Laker claimed that there was demand for this kind of service and maintained that it would increase the total number of passengers flying between Britain and the United States each year from 14m to 16m, rather than diverting other airlines' existing passengers.

Since approval for Skytrain was not forthcoming for several years, Laker Airways needed alternative work to keep its long-haul planes busy. Initially, both Boeing 707s supplemented the BAC One-Elevens on Mediterranean and Canary Islands routes, such as Gatwick – Palma de Mallorca and Gatwick–Tenerife. Both aircraft replaced Bristol Britannias (Note: the withdrawal of the Britannias made Laker Airways the first all-jet operator in Britain and Europe) on the airline's long-haul flights, an increasing number of which were affinity group charters to North America, primarily the US.

During summer 1970, Laker sought the UK and Australian authorities' permission to operate a series of affinity group charter flights to Australia. Following his request's refusal, he flew to Australia in early 1971 to discuss his proposal for 15-day inclusive tours from Australia to the UK, including full board at first class hotels for A$935, with the director-general of the Australian Department of Civil Aviation who doubled as Qantas's chairman. Freddie Laker’s visit did not succeed in convincing the Australian authorities of his proposal's merits as a result of lobbying from BOAC and Qantas, both of which were estimated to have lost £11 million in revenue due to competition from charter airlines on the Kangaroo route.

From December 1970, one of Laker's two 707s was used for a once-a-week low-fare service linking Luxembourg with Barbados on behalf of International Caribbean Airways, a joint venture between Barbados businessmen Norman Ricketts and Geoffrey Edwards, who enjoyed the support of the Barbados government, and Laker Airways. Laker Airways initially held a 33% stake in International Caribbean. (Note: in 1973, Sir Freddie bought out both of his Barbadian joint venture partners, while the Barbados Government took up an option to acquire a 51% stake in the airline; this increased Laker Airways's stake to 49%) The aircraft Laker Airways allocated to International Caribbean Airways sported International Caribbean as well as the Barbadian flag on both sides of the forward fuselage in place of Laker and the Union Flag featured by the company's other aircraft. In addition to the weekly Luxembourg–Barbados schedule, which subsequently became twice weekly and was extended to London Gatwick, this aircraft operated regular charters from Canada and West Germany to Barbados. In January 1975, the International Air Transport Association (IATA) designated International Caribbean Airways the flag carrier for Barbados.

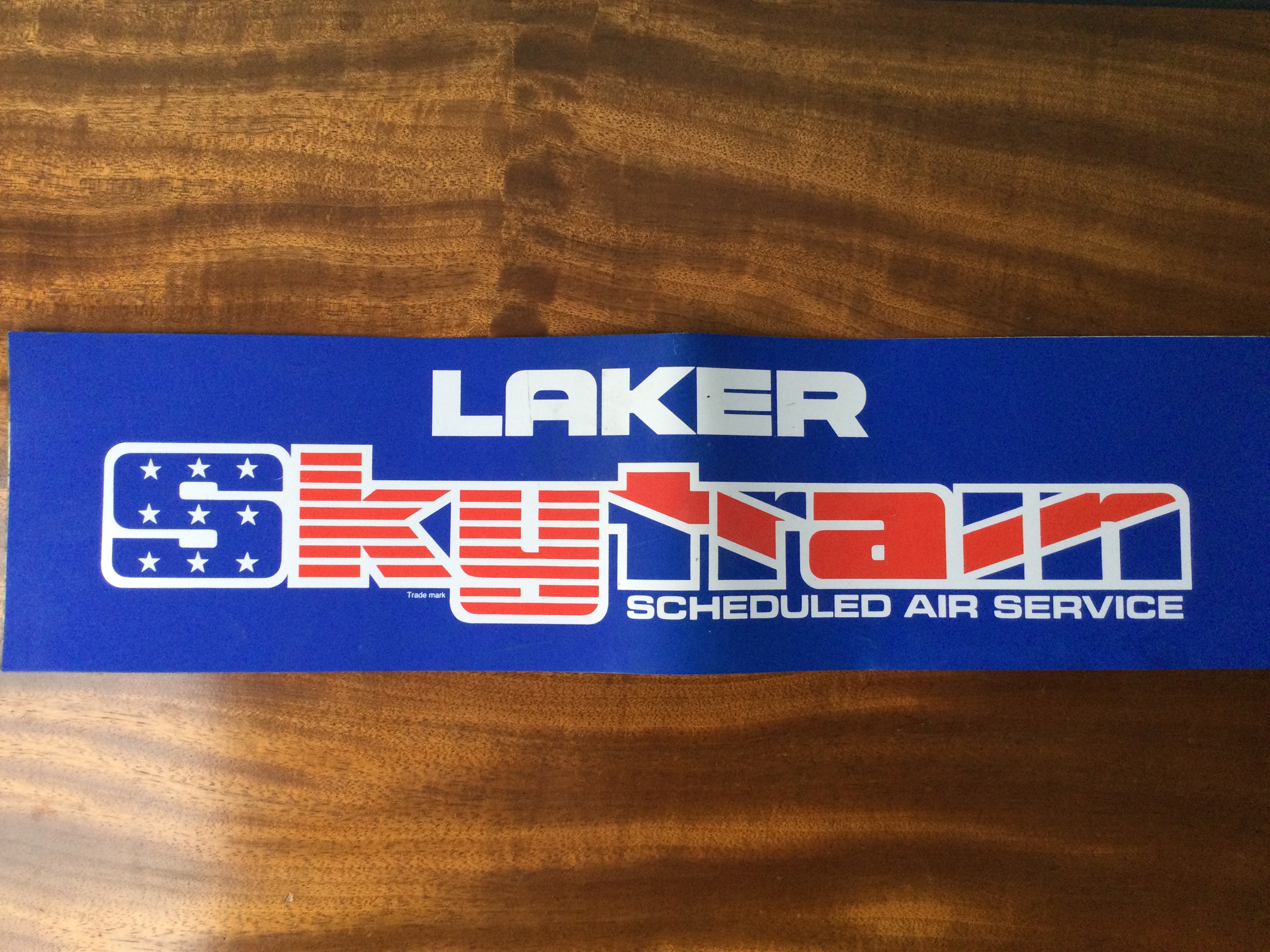
Skytrain Adhesive Advertising Banner. It uses the integrated images of the US and the UK flags.

Laker Airways had taken delivery of a fourth McDonnell-Douglas DC-10 series 10 widebodied jet in 1976 in preparation for the launch of its daily London to New York Skytrain. This aircraft was the DC-10's second prototype, which the airline had acquired direct from MDC at a knock-down price. By that time, the work force had expanded to 1,000. (Note: up from only 500 the year before)

Skytrain was inaugurated between London Gatwick and New York JFK on 26 September 1977. It recorded a profit in excess of £2 million in its first year of operation.

In early 1979, the airline ordered a further two DC-10 series 10 widebodies (Note: via Mitsui) as well as five longer range McDonnell-Douglas DC-10 series 30 widebodied aircraft. (Note: direct from MDC)

Laker Airways expanded to Los Angeles (1978). The company acquired two-second-hand Boeing 707-351B narrow-bodied long-haul aircraft from Cathay Pacific (Note: Northwest Airlines being the original operator) to commence non-stop operations to the US West Coast prior to receiving the first of the McDonnell-Douglas DC-10 series 30 aircraft that were on order.

Following a public hearing, the Civil Aviation Authority (CAA) approved Laker's request to operate unrestricted Skytrain services at the beginning of July 1979. This enabled the airline to offer bookable seats, excursion fares and the carriage of cargo in addition to the original, non-bookable Skytrain fare from Gatwick to New York JFK and Los Angeles.

With the arrival of the series 30 DC-10s, Intasun owner Harry Goodman recognised that long-haul charters to new destinations were now available and approached Laker with a number of possibilities from the Caribbean to Florida. Eventually, Goodman chose Florida and Disney World charters were introduced to the UK market. The programme rapidly expanded to seven times weekly and was eventually converted into a Skytrain operation to Miami.

By October 1980, Laker introduced fully bookable Super Economy fares on all Skytrain services. These were approximately half its competitors' standard economy fares and significantly lower than those airlines' Super APEX (Note: Advanced Purchase Excursion) fares. The airline reserved about 60% of its scheduled seats for the new bookable fares. This move marked a major strategic shift in the company's fare structure.

Tampa, Florida, was added in 1981 from Gatwick, Manchester and Prestwick, following lobbying from Bob Beckman's client. (Note: Bob Beckman was Laker's American lawyer) By that time, the firm had sold both the older, shorter fuselage Boeing 707-138Bs (Note: one to Indonesia and one to Africa) and disposed of one BAC One-Eleven. (Note: acquired by Dan-Air) This left it with 20 aircraft comprising 14 widebodies and six narrowbodies – 11 DC-10s, (Note: five series 30 and six series 10 aircraft) three A300s, two 707s and four One-Elevens, doubling the size within only five years. Over this period, the number working for Laker Airways and associated companies doubled again to 2,000.

During the 1981 summer period, Laker operated up to three daily frequencies each way between Gatwick and JFK and Gatwick and Miami as well as twice daily round-trips between Gatwick and Los Angeles. This made Laker the fourth biggest transatlantic scheduled airline between the UK and US (Note: behind British Airways, Pan Am and Trans World Airlines (TWA)) as well as fifth biggest overall. By that time, the airline had carried over two million Skytrain passengers.

=== Widebody era ===
In November 1972, Laker Airways became the first airline outside North America to operate the McDonnell Douglas DC-10 widebody when it took delivery of a pair of new series 10 aircraft (Note: these aircraft incorporated Skytrain titles in a hybrid "Union Jack / Stars and Stripes" scheme on the starboard side of the white upper forward part of the fuselage, in anticipation of approval to commence Skytrain) from McDonnell Douglas Corporation's (MDC) factory in Long Beach, California, via Japanese lessor Mitsui.

=== Simplified charter rules ===
On 1 April 1973, new charter regulations in the UK, the US and Canada replaced the complicated "affinity group" rules with simplified rules termed "Advance Booking Charters", popularly known as ABC. The following day, a Laker Airways McDonnell-Douglas DC-10 flew the world's inaugural ABC flight from Manchester to Toronto. Laker's first ABC passengers had paid £45 round-trip. The inaugural flight was operated under contract to Laker's Liverpool-based in-house package tour operator Arrowsmith Holidays, a group company since 1967. It was followed by similar ABC services from Prestwick and a three-times-a-week Gatwick–Toronto ABC operation. The latter was operated under contract to Lord Brothers, the airline's London-based in-house tour operator that had been part of the group since 1968 and changed its name to Laker Air Travel in 1974.

A third DC-10 series 10 widebody joined the fleet in April 1974 to maintain the airline's commitments in the ABC flights market. (Laker intended to allocate two DC-10s exclusively to Skytrain in anticipation of the start of daily services between Stansted and Newark later that year. This aircraft was eventually used to meet growing ABC commitments.)

The new ABC rules enabled Sir Freddie to build a successful ABC flights business across the North Atlantic over the next couple of years, making Laker Airways the market leader in transatlantic ABC flights. During the early to mid-1970s, the airline ran low-key advertising on hoardings and public transport in London, Manchester and other large British cities under the motto "Take a Laker".

Laker's transatlantic charters provided meals, movies (at the time, a new amenity), and a free bar.

The success of Laker Airways's transatlantic ABC flights resulted in an application to launch an Australian low-fare operation from Gatwick and/or Luxembourg to Sydney and Melbourne. Laker's application was dismissed by Peter Nixon, the Australian Transport Minister. Nixon stated that the UK–Australia scheduled air services market was to remain the preserve of BA and Qantas. This decision was the result of successful lobbying by Qantas, which had exerted pressure on its government to protect the long-established duopoly it shared with British Airways on the Kangaroo route under a joint revenue-sharing agreement. Nixon also maintained that the proposed service to only two Australian points would be discriminatory on people living in other parts of the country by denying them the benefits of low fares. These comments prompted Sir Freddie to retort that the Australian transport minister still thought the earth was flat, and that it had not come to his attention that Australia already had a number of regional airlines covering the whole of the country.

An advertising campaign featuring the slogan "I've got my name on every plane!" was developed in conjunction with a New York-based company. It was successfully launched during the Super Bowl VIII interval in January 1974. "Laker to London – the end of Skyway robbery" was the follow-on campaign. The success of these campaigns resulted in Laker carrying more non-scheduled UK–US passengers than all US carriers combined.

Despite attaining market leadership in the transatlantic ABC market, Sir Freddie considered this second best in the absence of his Skytrain service.

=== Attempts to expand Skytrain ===
==== Plans for a new low-fare Australian service ====
In 1980, Laker Airways withdrew its application to run ABC flights to Australia. Instead, the airline proposed a scheduled low-fare service from London Gatwick with one stop. It was to be one flight a day in each direction using the airline's five DC-10-30 widebodies. In contrast to Skytrain, this was to feature a first class section called Pullman. It was to operate three flights per week each to Sydney and Melbourne respectively, and one to Perth.

The CAA took a negative view of Laker's application for a UK–Australia scheduled low-fare service and a rival application by BCal to launch a conventional, scheduled service between Gatwick and four Australian destinations via Colombo at four flights a week each way. It considered Laker's market growth forecast overoptimistic, its stimulation factors unreal, and its fares intentions vague. In the CAA's opinion, the Australians were unlikely to accept another UK airline without a reciprocal service from a second Australian carrier, and the traffic on the UK–Australia route would not support two additional carriers without a substantial reduction in service frequencies of the incumbent operators. (The CAA told BCal that it considered its proposal for a new, faster service to Australia superior to Laker's, and that it would therefore look favourably on its application if it wished to re-apply with specific proposals for a joint Anglo-Australian operation.)

==== Second designated UK carrier to Hong Kong ====
The UK government decided in 1979 to open the route between London and Hong Kong to competition. This was to be by a second British scheduled carrier to ease the shortage of seats passengers were experiencing at peak times on the ten-times-a-week monopoly service by BA from Heathrow.

A race ensued when BCal, Laker and Cathay Pacific, Hong Kong's de facto "flag carrier", filed their applications with the CAA in London.

Laker proposed a daily Skytrain linking Gatwick and Hong Kong via Sharjah to be operated with single-class, 380-seat McDonnell Douglas DC-10-30s. At the CAA hearing the airline proposed larger, higher capacity Boeing 747s as soon as this was justified by increased demand. The company tried to convince the CAA that its additional all-economy class discount service was the best option to alleviate the shortage of seats on this route. Its analysis showed the bottom end of the economy market was the most under-served segment because of the scarcity of low fares. The other airlines used Laker's analysis in support of their claims that Skytrain would flood the market with cheap seats that risked undermining profitability without doing anything to alleviate the shortage of premium seats. Laker retorted that low fares would stimulate the market by meeting untapped demand from people who could not afford to fly this route because of BA's high fares, rather than taking market share from competitors. It pointed to the success of its transatlantic Skytrain in helping create demand while maintaining that its rivals' proposals would do little to meet the unsatisfied demand for low-fare seats.

The CAA awarded a licence to operate unlimited scheduled services between London and Hong Kong to BCal, which had proposed running a conventional service from Gatwick via Dubai, using its growing fleet of McDonnell Douglas DC-10-30 widebodies in a three-class configuration featuring a first and an executive class in addition to economy. BCal had also agreed to offer a number of low fares that would match the lowest fares Laker had proposed. The CAA rejected Cathay Pacific's and Laker's applications, clearing the way for BCal to become the second British scheduled carrier on that route.

However, Hong Kong's Air Transport Licensing Authority (ATLA) refused to endorse BCal because many felt upset that Cathay Pacific was excluded from one of the world's most lucrative routes. This caused a row between the UK and Hong Kong governments. Cathay Pacific began lobbying in the Crown colony as well as in the UK, stressing it had invested millions in the British economy at a time of high unemployment in the UK by placing large orders for Rolls-Royce RB211-powered Boeing 747s. The UK government allowed Cathay Pacific to join Laker in appealing to John Nott, the UK Secretary of State for Trade and Industry, against the CAA's award of a licence exclusively to BCal. The Secretary of State overturned the CAA's decision and opened the route to all three airlines without placing restrictions on frequencies of service. For Laker Airways this turned out to be a partial victory because the ATLA continued to refuse a reciprocal permit, without which Laker's service remained grounded.

Cathay Pacific commenced a thrice-weekly service between Hong Kong and London Gatwick via Bahrain on 17 July 1980 using a Rolls-Royce RB211-powered Boeing 747-200B ahead of BCal, which began a four-times-a-week London Gatwick – Hong Kong service via Dubai on 1 August 1980 using a McDonnell-Douglas DC-10-30.

==== Globetrain ====
Laker Airways planned to link its Gatwick – Los Angeles Skytrain with the proposed Gatwick – Hong Kong Skytrain across the Pacific via Honolulu and Tokyo to create the first daily round-the-world through service by a British airline in both directions. (Note: at the time Pan Am was the only airline to operate such a service) This was to be marketed under the trademark Globetrain.

Cathay Pacific was among airlines attacking Laker's plans. The established transpacific airlines were concerned that Laker was likely to create excess capacity, threatening the profitability as well as long-term viability of these routes. Sir Freddie said Cathay seemed concerned about sharing the Hong Kong – Tokyo route with a competitor because this route was the main source of profits for Cathay Pacific's Asian and transpacific operation.

Laker abandoned Globetrain due to its inability to obtain regulatory approvals.

==== Proposed Skytrain routes to Europe ====
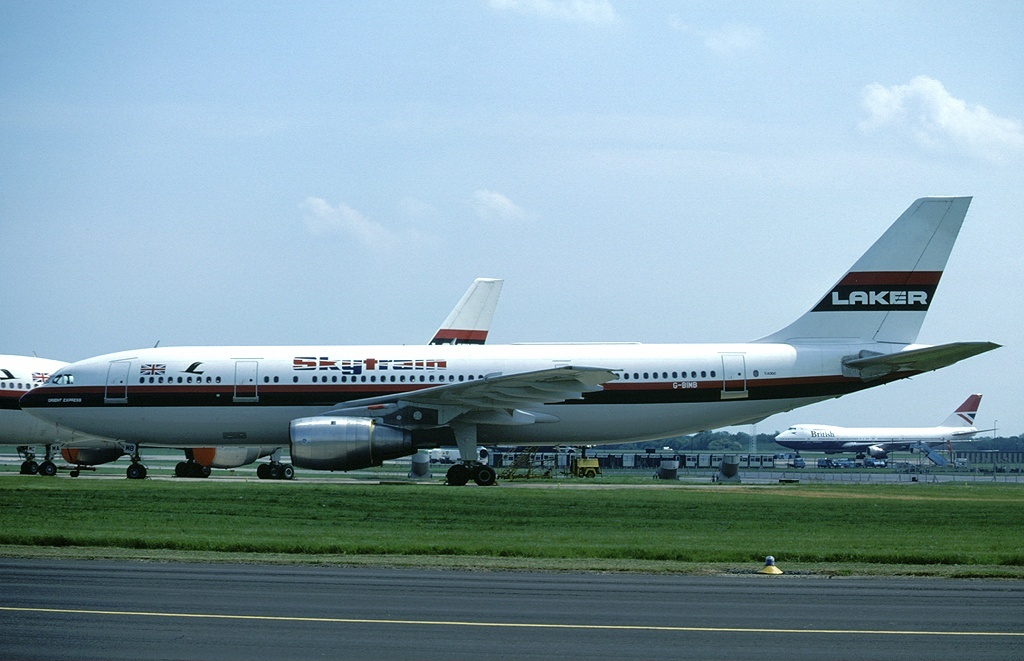
Laker Skytrain Airbus A300 in 1982

In September 1978, Laker Airways became the UK launch customer for the twin-engined Airbus A300, short and medium-haul widebodied jet. The airline ordered 10 series B4 aircraft in a 314-seat single-class configuration to serve a network of up to 666 European Skytrain routes. The majority of the low-fare network was not going to touch the UK, making it the first pan-European commercial airline.

Laker's European Skytrain plans were opposed by BCal, which was keen to expand its European network beyond routes linking Gatwick with Paris-Charles de Gaulle, Amsterdam, Brussels and Genoa. BCal needed to develop its connecting traffic at Gatwick by expanding the European network to include Germany, Switzerland, Scandinavia and Southern Europe to help it increase loads on flights to Africa, South America and the US as well as improve profitability. BCal came up with its own proposal, Miniprix, to counter Laker. This alternative was less ambitious than Laker's. Excluding BCal's existing four European routes, it envisaged linking Gatwick with 20 additional points on the continent. Services were to be operated during off-peak times with BAC One-Eleven 500s and Boeing 707-320Cs. BCal was considering both the McDonnell Douglas MD-80 narrowbody as well as the Airbus A310 widebody as long-term replacements for its existing narrow-bodied aircraft on these proposed routes.

Dan-Air and Britannia Airways, the UK's leading charter airlines, feared that without reciprocal foreign regulatory approvals Laker would be forced to dump this additional widebody capacity on the European charter market, creating excess capacity that would collapse charter rates.

The CAA heard Laker's as well as BCal's and other UK independent airlines' proposals. It rejected Laker. It subsequently awarded two scheduled licences to Laker Airways, one for Gatwick – Berlin Tegel and the other for Gatwick–Zürich, following British Airways's decision to abandon short-haul routes it had been operating from Gatwick at low frequencies since the late 1970s and to surrender unused licences to the CAA. By the time the CAA awarded Laker these licences, the airline was experiencing financial difficulties and had to dispose of three A300 widebodies to cut costs by reducing the number of aircraft types as well as its overall size. Laker Airways intended to commence operations on both routes during the spring of 1982, operating two flights a day each way using spare capacity on its remaining BAC One-Elevens. The airline ceased to exist before the inaugural date. (Note: both routes were subsequently operated by Dan-Air)

Laker introduced a short-lived scheduled service between Manchester and Zürich during 1981, which it operated at one flight per day in each direction using a newly delivered A300 widebody. This route, the airline's only short-haul scheduled operation, had come about after British Airways's decision to abandon its loss-making Manchester–Zürich services. Laker's application to have BA's licence transferred to itself resulted in its becoming the UK flag carrier between Manchester and Zürich. The airline's subsequent withdrawal and its demise in turn resulted in Dan-Air becoming the UK flag carrier between Manchester and Zürich.

BCal began offering Miniprix fares on off-peak services on Gatwick–Amsterdam after it had obtained approval from the UK authorities and their Dutch counterparts.

==== Additional Skytrain routes to the United States ====
Laker Airways sought to strengthen its position as a transatlantic airline by applying to the CAA and the Civil Aeronautics Board (CAB) for licences to serve additional US cities under the Bermuda II UK-US accord. Both the CAA and the CAB approved the application to commence daily Skytrain services from Gatwick, Manchester and Prestwick to Chicago, Detroit, Oakland, Seattle and Washington DC. The company did not have aircraft to use these licences immediately. Its deteriorating financial position did not let it add more aircraft. By the time Laker Airways went out of business, those licences remained unused. They were eventually allocated to other airlines.

== Bankruptcy ==
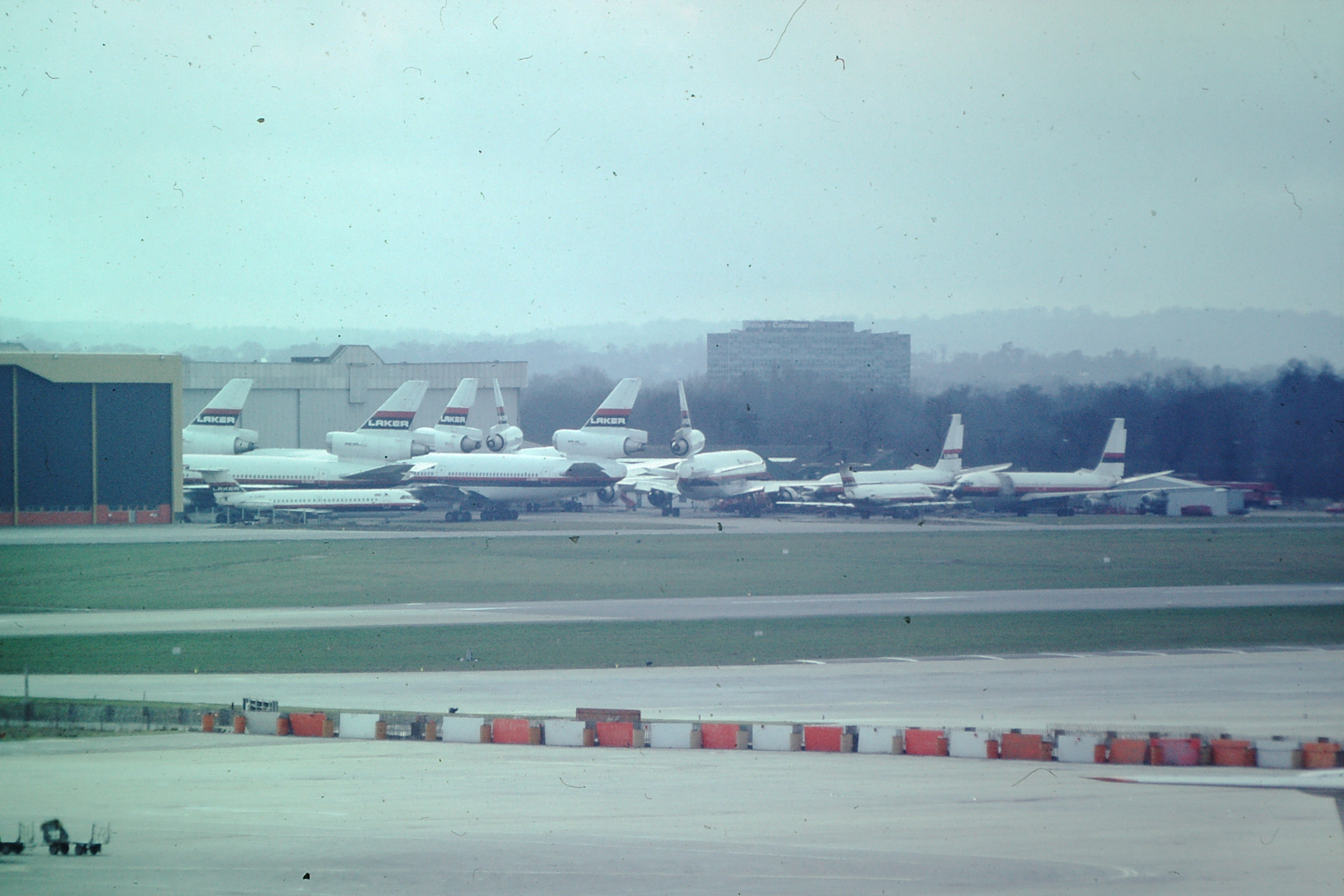
Laker Airways aircraft stored the day after bankruptcy, 5 February 1982

Laker Airways did not have the financial strength to survive the early 1980s recession and competition by the established scheduled airlines. Swiss aviation enthusiasts' magazine Interavia had reported in a 1978 issue that Laker's issued share capital was £10,000. As per the airline's 1980 balance sheet, the paid-up share capital was £504,000. These figures compared unfavourably with BCal and British Airways, whose issued share capital stood at £12 million and £100 million respectively. (Note: as per the relevant 1978 Interavia edition)

As long ago as June 1971, when Skytrain was first announced, it was revealed that Laker Airways had net assets of £1.68 million and tax equalisation reserves of £450,000. Although this amounted to over £2 million, it could not disguise the fact that Laker Airways was a financial minnow compared with most of the established flag carriers and BCal.

The weak financial position was underlined by the fact that 90 per cent of the share capital was held by Freddie Laker and the remainder by Joan Laker, a former spouse, while Laker Airways was a subsidiary of Laker Airways (Leasing), which in turn was a subsidiary of Jersey-incorporated Laker Airways (International). This had served the firm well since it allowed it to take advantage of lower taxes and more employer-friendly labour legislation in the Channel Islands. (Note: compared with the UK) However, the fact that the airline's ultimate holding company was in an off-shore tax haven outside the jurisdiction of UK law increased lenders' risk to get their money back.

In addition to undercapitalisation, unsustainably high debts and weak finances, Laker Airways was not backed by any significant assets. The bulk of its fleet (Note: including all widebodies) was leased, as was the maintenance hangar at Gatwick that also housed the airline's offices. The only financial backup that Laker Airways had was Freddie Laker's stud farm and his personal wealth.

=== Economic climate ===
Both the UK and US were in recession in the early 1980s, characterised by negative/low growth, high unemployment, high inflation and high interest rates. During that period the company was expanding to sustain commercial success generally and that of Skytrain in particular. Laker Airways needed to position itself to take advantage of additional opportunities to expand its business to maintain its status as Britain's second largest independent airline and third principal long-haul operator. (Note: behind British Airways and BCal) Eventually, the company borrowed at high interest rates. The high interest rates were a major cause for the increase in the firm's borrowing costs as well as its debts.

Although the Laker Airways fleet contained a greater proportion of modern widebodied aircraft than most of its competitors, which made it cheaper to operate and maintain, the airline felt the sudden tripling of the price of crude oil in the aftermath of the Shah of Iran's fall from power. Laker Airways needed to pay the high spot market oil prices because it could not hedge its future supplies by negotiating fixed-rate, forward purchases. Such financial derivatives were non-existent.

The airline attempted to protect itself against sterling-dollar exchange rate fluctuations by buying US dollars at a fixed rate. This was a necessity as most of its costs were in dollars whereas most of its income was in pounds sterling. The company's growing problems were exacerbated by wrongly anticipating the sterling-dollar exchange rate for the 1981/2 winter season. During all 1980 and the better part of 1981 the rate was 1:2. The pound could buy two dollars because sterling was kept high by Britain's North Sea oil exports and the importance these exports assumed against high crude oil prices. Laker Airways did not anticipate the speed of sterling's subsequent decline. This meant that it needed to pay more for dollars than it had originally budgeted, leading to an outflow of funds at a time of financial crisis.

=== Demise ===
The Skytrain concept was flawed, as it required high year-round loads to make money at discount prices, even though Laker Airways had lower costs and a simpler organisation.

The airline began to fail when Pan Am, a transatlantic competitor, decided in October 1981 to lower its lowest economy fares where it was in competition with Skytrain by up to 66%. Laker retaliated by introducing a discounted premium cabin branded Regency Class. Following the end of the 1981/2 winter peak, there was insufficient traffic to support four airlines competing across the North Atlantic between January and March. At this point, state-owned British Airways and TWA, Laker's other transatlantic competitors, dropped their fares by a similar amount. As a result, Laker's loads and cash inflow halved between October 1981 and February 1982. It has also been suggested that Laker experienced a downturn after passengers began avoiding the DC-10 due to the series of high-profile fatal accidents that befell the type at the end of the 1970s.

The final blow to Laker Airways came when British Caledonian (BCal) and other European operators of the DC-10 warned McDonnell Douglas and GE that if the companies moved forward with a rescue contract with Laker, they would cease all business with those companies. McDonnell Douglas and GE did not proceed with the rescue, and Laker Airways collapsed in the early morning of 5 February 1982 with debts of £270 million, the largest corporate failure in Britain.

Freddie Laker sued IATA member airlines British Airways, BCal, Pan Am, TWA, Lufthansa, Air France, Swissair, KLM, SAS, Sabena, Alitalia and UTA for conspiracy to put his airline out of business by predatory pricing. They settled out of court for US$50 million. BA reached a separate out-of-court agreement with Freddie Laker personally for £8 million.

In July 1985, BA agreed to contribute an additional $35 million on top of its earlier out-of-court agreement with Freddie Laker. The total amount contributed by all parties enabled Laker to pay off his outstanding debts of $69 million, permitted BA to proceed with its own privatisation, and saved the other airlines from potential bankruptcy.

Following Laker's demise, its former fleet was quickly re-allocated to other operators. These included two DC-10-10 widebodies that joined the fleet of British Caledonian Charter (BCal's charter division), four BAC One-Eleven 300 narrow-bodies BCal's seven One-Eleven 200s, and two Airbus A300B4 widebodies that were placed with Air Jamaica.

== Incidents and accidents ==
On 17 August 1969, a BAC One-Eleven 320L (registration: G-AVBX) operating a charter flight from Klagenfurt, Austria, to Berlin Tegel, Germany, under contract to West Berlin package holiday company Flug-Union Berlin. The aircraft made an emergency landing at Hanover Airport because of an electrical fire in an aerial tuning unit in the forward cabin area behind the flight deck. The fire started when the aircraft was 30 nautical miles (56 km) from Hanover, filling the cabin with fumes. This reduced visibility on the flight deck to 18 inches (46 cm). Forward vision was nil.

Using the emergency oxygen system, the captain began his emergency descent from FL250 under radar guidance from Hanover air traffic control (ATC), while the co-pilot depressurised the aircraft and attempted to open a side window to clear the smoke. The cabin crew were deprived of both their public address system and intercom with the flight deck during the descent. Due to lack of time before landing, emergency procedures were abandoned. Following the successful emergency landing, the aircraft came to a rapid halt clear of the runway. By the time the last of the 89 occupants (5 crew and 84 passengers) had evacuated the aircraft, the fire had burned through the pressure hull and was being fed by oxygen. There were no injuries. The fire was extinguished on the ground. Following the incident, the aircraft manufacturer issued several service bulletins (SBs) listing action to be taken as mandated by the UK's Airworthiness Requirements Board (ARB). These SBs were circulated to all One-Eleven operators. The ARB also issued a more general warning to all One-Eleven operators regarding the need to ensure that oxygen leaks do not create fire hazards, and that oxygen lines are routed away from potential fire sources.

As a result of this incident, the ARB also began to pay close attention to the fire resistance of aircraft fittings and furnishings due to their potential to form major hazards in oxygen-fed inflight fires. The flight deck crew, Captain Basil Bradshaw and First Officer Bernard Sedgwick, subsequently received the Queen's Commendation for Valuable Service in the Air, while the cabin crew were commended for their action during the emergency. The citation for the Queen's Award stated that "the crew displayed a high standard of airmanship in circumstances which could have had very serious consequences".

== Other Laker Airways operations ==
- Laker Airways was an airline based in the Bahamas to which Sir Freddie Laker lent his name and operational expertise. The airline was established in 1992 with financial assistance from Oscar Wyatt, a Texas oilman and business partner of Laker. The fleet comprised two Boeing 727-200 Advanced narrow-bodied jet aircraft. According to the Official Airline Guide (OAG), in 1994 the airline was operating scheduled nonstop service between Freeport, Bahamas and Baltimore, Maryland, Birmingham, Alabama, Chicago, Illinois (via Chicago O'Hare Airport), Cincinnati, Ohio, Fort Lauderdale, Florida, Greenville, South Carolina, Memphis, Tennessee, Raleigh, North Carolina, Richmond, Virginia and West Palm Beach, Florida. By 1995, the OAG listed nonstop Laker service between Freeport and these same US cities with the exception of Birmingham, Greenville and Memphis with new nonstop flights being operated between Freeport and Cleveland, Ohio and Hartford, Connecticut. Laker Airways (Bahamas) was wound up in 2005.
- Laker Airways, Inc was a US-registered airline Sir Freddie Laker co-owned with Oscar Wyatt. The company commenced operations in April 1996 with a leased fleet of four McDonnell Douglas DC-10-30 widebodied jets and 300 employees. Twice-weekly low-fare, high-quality scheduled services linking Fort Lauderdale in Florida with London Gatwick were inaugurated on 5 July 1996, followed by similar services linking Orlando with Manchester and Glasgow Prestwick. These flights featured an executive class with leather seats, seat back TVs and inflight catering marketed as Regency Class Service. A daily Miami–Gatwick service was to start in March 1997. Laker Airways, Inc ceased operations in 1998.
- Laker Airways Limited was incorporated as a Company in England and Wales in June 2013 and was a division of a larger aviation training, recruitment and consultancy firm. The company was registered at offices near to Liverpool John Lennon Airport. The company was dissolved on 9 September 2014 .

== Fleet ==
Laker operated the following aircraft types at various times over the years:

- Airbus A300B4
- Boeing 707 (series −138B and −351B models)
- Boeing 727-200 Advanced (Laker Airways Bahamas operation)
- British Aircraft Corporation BAC One-Eleven (series −300 and −400 models)
- Bristol Britannia (series −102 model)
- McDonnell Douglas DC-10-10
- McDonnell Douglas DC-10-30
- Vickers VC10 (leased to Middle East Airlines and not operated by Laker Airways)

== Legacy ==
Unlike Laker, the vast majority of low-cost airlines have limited themselves to short and midrange flights and shunned the long range market. Almost all attempts to enter the long range market with a low cost model have ended within a couple of years in either withdrawal or bankruptcy.

Sir Freddie Laker was an influence for Sir Richard Branson and his establishment of Virgin Atlantic.

At London Southend Airport is the Lakers bar & restaurant, named after the airline.

== See also ==
- List of defunct airlines of the United Kingdom

== Notes and citations ==
Notes

Citations

== Bibliography ==
- Eglin, Roger; Ritchie, Berry (1980). Fly me, I'm Freddie. London: Weidenfeld & Nicolson. ISBN 0-297-77746-7.
- Banks, H. (1982). The rise and the fall of Freddie Laker. London: Faber & Faber.
