= Aviance UK =

UK aircraft ground handling agent

- Aviance logo
- Company type: Aircraft ground handling
- Industry: Aviation (Outsourcing)
- Founded: 2000
- Headquarters: Heathrow Airport
- Products: Aircraft ground handling Airport lounges
- Number of employees: 21,500
- Parent: Go-Ahead Group
- Website: www.aviance.com

Aviance UK was an aircraft ground handling agent, operating at 15 airports in the United Kingdom and many more, as part of its alliance, worldwide. It was a subsidiary of the Go-Ahead Group, a rail, bus and aviation services provider across the UK. In December 2009 it was announced that Aviance UK would move away from the aviation industry beginning with the sale of 11 aviance stations to Servisair with contracts due for exchange by late January 2010. Stations at Heathrow Terminal 1 and Jersey Airport remained with Aviance until its contracts expired in 2011.

== History ==
The name Aviance UK was adopted following the acquisition of Reed Aviation, Midland Airport Services and British Midland International's ground handling activities, which merged with the Go-Ahead owned company Gatwick Handling.

On 31 August 2004, Aviance acquired full ownership of Plane Handling, purchasing the remaining 50% shareholding from its then joint venture partner Virgin Aviation for £20 million.

== Operations ==
Aviance divided operations into several service lines (although not all services were available at every location in the UK):

- Ground Handling
- Cargo
- Lounges
- Airport Agencies
- Central De-Icing

== Former locations ==
- Aberdeen Airport
- Belfast City Airport
- Belfast International Airport
- Birmingham Airport
- Cardiff Airport
- Edinburgh Airport
- Gatwick Airport
- Glasgow Airport
- Heathrow Airport
- Jersey Airport
- Liverpool Airport
- Luton Airport
- Manchester Airport
- Southampton Airport
- Stansted Airport
- Teesside International Airport
