= Dnata UK =

Aircraft ground handling company

dnata UK
- Formerly: Plane Handling
- Industry: Aviation
- Founded: 1987
- Headquarters: Colnbrook, England
- Services: Aircraft ground handling Airport lounges
- Revenue: £148.8 million
- Operating income: £7.0 million
- Net income: £4.6 million
- Number of employees: 3200
- Parent: dnata
- Website: www.dnata.co.uk

dnata UK is an aircraft ground handling company operating in England.

== History ==
dnata UK was founded in 1987 as Plane Handling. By 1998, Gatwick Handling and Virgin Group each held a 50% shareholding. These were sold in October 1998 and August 2004 respectively to the Go-Ahead Group. In December 2009, the business was sold to dnata and rebranded.

== Services ==
dnata UK specialises in ground and cargo handling at London Gatwick, London Heathrow (terminals 2, 3 and 4) and Manchester Airports. Its clients include Cathay Pacific, Emirates, Etihad, Singapore Airlines and Virgin Atlantic.
