= Carousel Buses =

Buckinghamshire bus operator

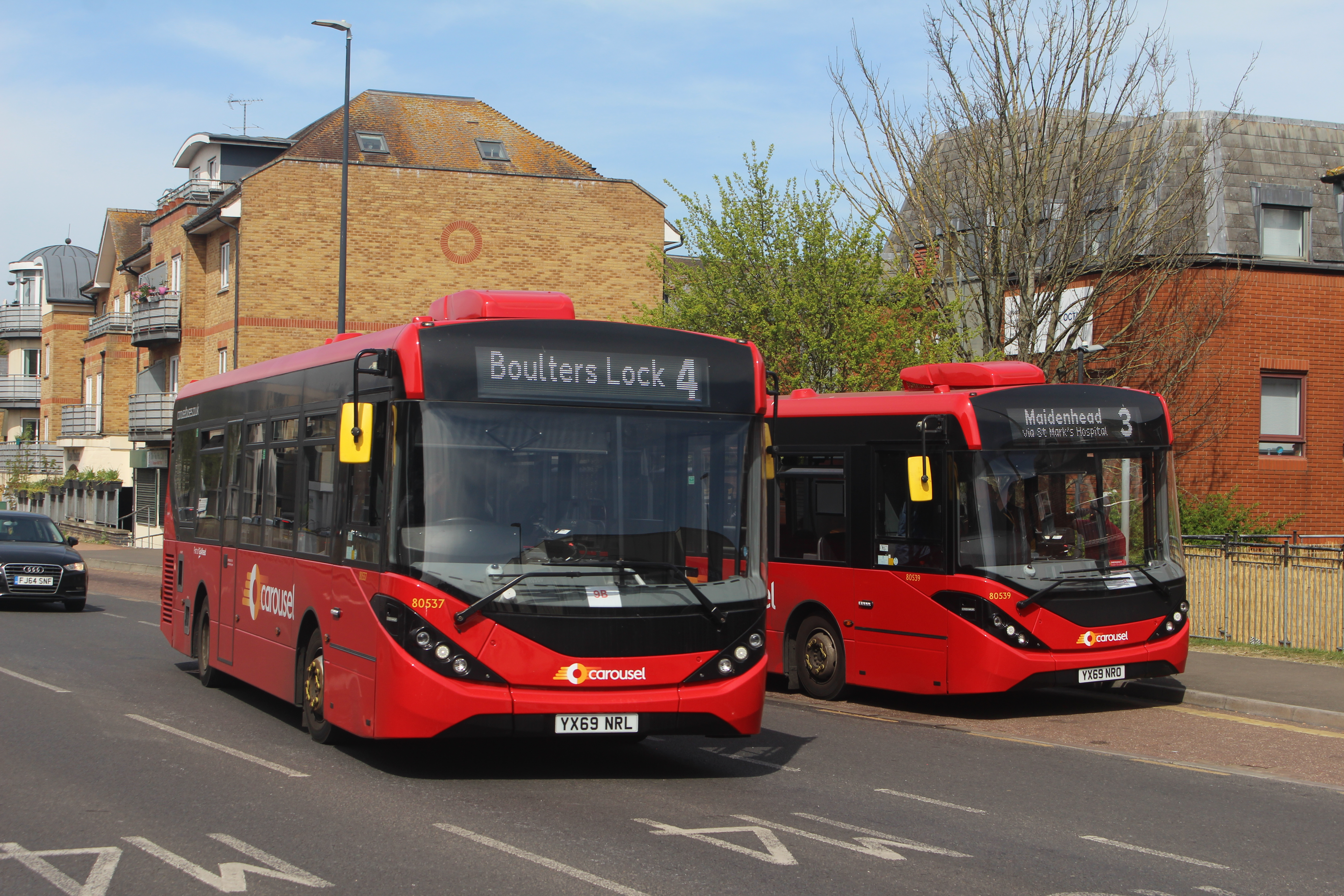
- Alexander Dennis Enviro200 MMC in Maidenhead in April 2025
- Parent: Go-Ahead Group
- Founded: 2000; 26 years ago
- Headquarters: Unit 2, Hughenden Avenue, High Wycombe HP13 5SG
- Service area: Buckinghamshire; Hertfordshire; Oxfordshire; Berkshire; Greater London; Surrey
- Service type: Bus services
- Routes: 61 (Includes School Routes)
- Stations: High Wycombe Bus Station (adjoining the Eden Centre); High Wycombe Coachway; Slough Bus Station
- Fleet: 131 (Oct 2026)
- Managing Director: Luke Marion
- Website: Carousel Buses

Carousel Buses Limited, trading as Carousel Buses, is a bus company based in High Wycombe, Buckinghamshire, England. Originally an independent company, it is a subsidiary of the Go-Ahead Group's Oxford Bus Company operation alongside Pearces Coaches of Oxfordshire, Thames Travel, also of Oxfordshire and Pulham's Coaches of Gloucestershire having been purchased as the 50-vehicle independent operator in February 2012.

== History ==
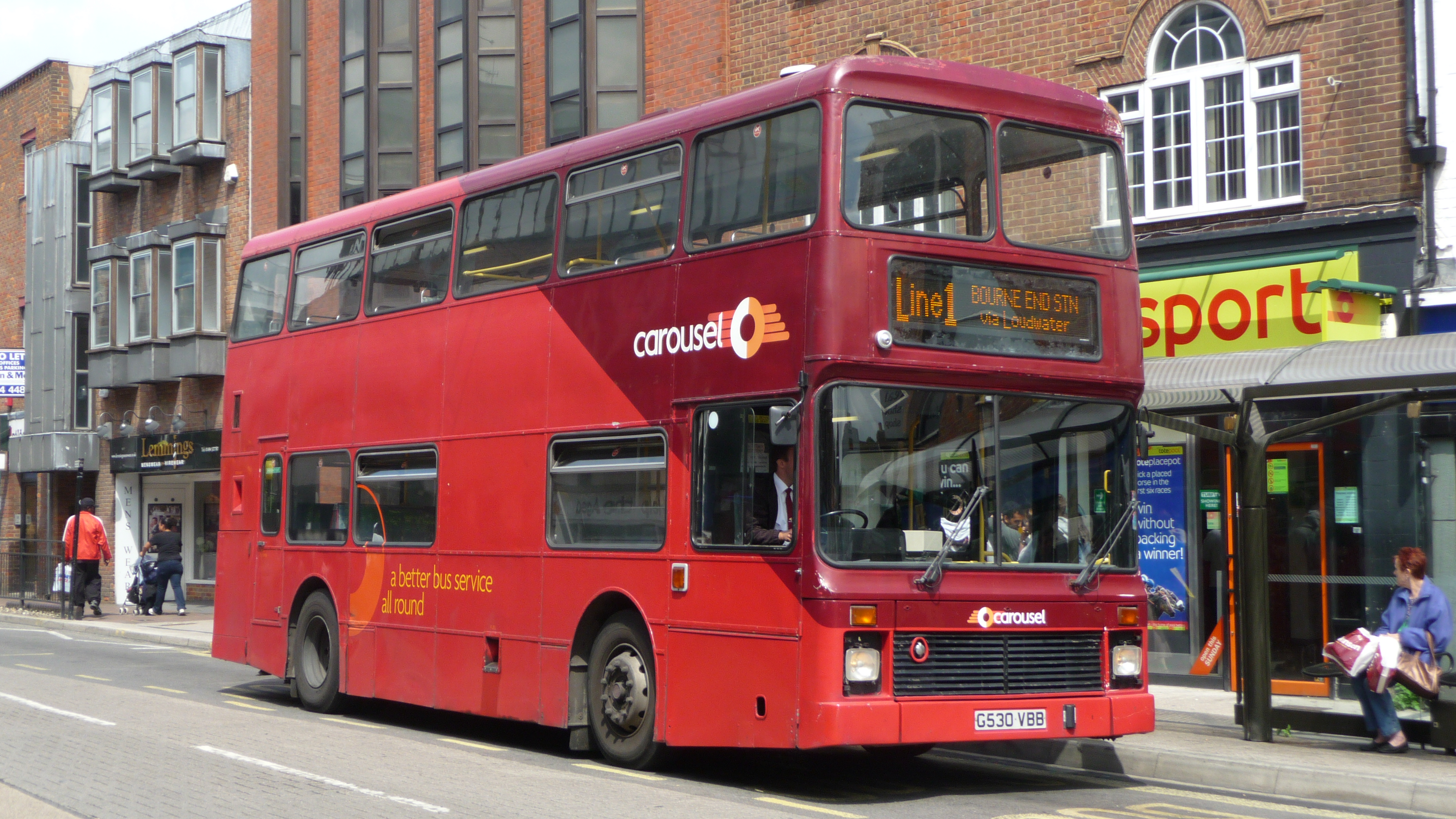
Northern Counties Palatine bodied Leyland Olympian in High Wycombe in July 2009

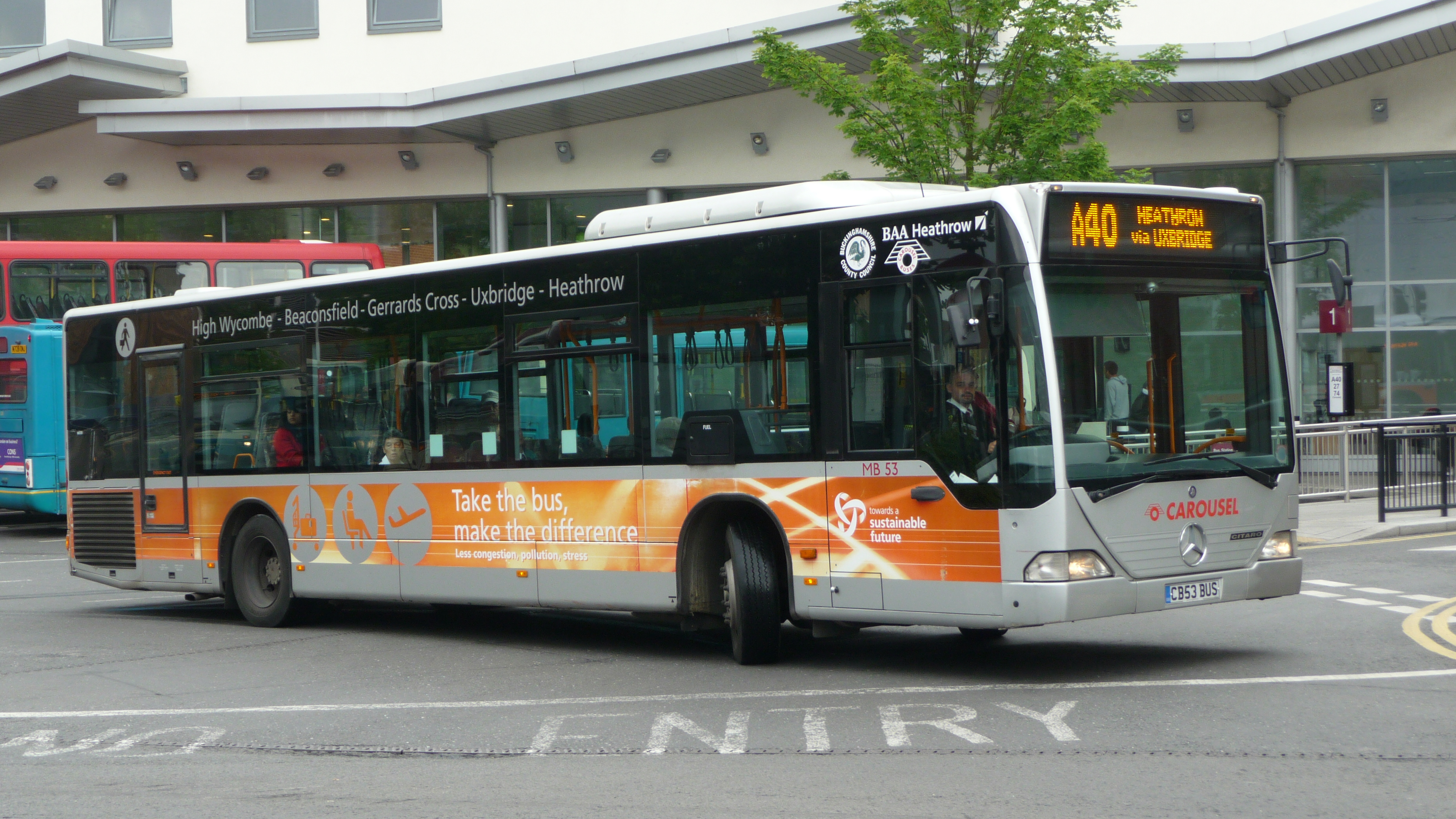
Mercedes-Benz Citaro in the original livery for route A40 in High Wycombe in July 2009.

Carousel Buses was formed in 2000 by Steve Burns and John Robinson. It initially expanded by winning Buckinghamshire County Council contracts.

In August 2003 route A40 High Wycombe to Heathrow Airport commenced, initially using second-hand Leyland Olympian double-deckers. By April 2004 these had been replaced by new low-floor Mercedes-Benz Citaro single-deck buses, in a dedicated silver and red livery. The route, which ran in partnership with Buckinghamshire County Council and Heathrow Airport Holdings, was formally introduced in January 2004.

The company launched a new commercial route in June 2004, replacing services withdrawn by Arriva The Shires between High Wycombe and Lane End.

In March 2008 Carousel introduced routes 35 and 36, branded as Purple Route, to replace a withdrawn Arriva Shires & Essex service to Flackwell Heath. The 35 was temporarily withdrawn in January 2010 because of road conditions, but was later restored. Arriva Shires & Essex currently run a combined 35 service with Carousel, with Carousel operating all daytime services, and Arriva operating evening and Sunday journeys. In October 2008 the majority of services to Winchmore Hill were withdrawn, leaving the village with just one bus a day.

In August 2009 route 336, which had previously run between Watford and Amersham, was extended to High Wycombe reinstating a through link for the first time in 30 years. The network of routes linking Chesham and Amersham, numbered 373, 374 and 375, were rationalised into two routes, the 71 and 73, running hourly between the two locations. These routes have since changed to Red Rose Travel, linking Whelpley Hill and Ley Hill to Hilltop, Chesham Broadway, Chesham Bois, Amersham Station, Quill Hall Estate, Little Chalfont, Penn Street, Coleshill and Winchmore Hill, where Carousel no longer serves.

In September 2009 two new routes were introduced, route 740 supplemented the A40 between High Wycombe and Uxbridge, increasing the overall frequency to every 30 minutes and incorporating Beaconsfield, and route 730 from Chesham to Heathrow Airport.

A further change saw the existing route to Lane End replaced by new circular routes 2A and 2C in April 2010. These are no longer Carousel services.

In March 2012 Carousel Buses was purchased by the Go-Ahead Group. Carousel retains its identity, with its management passing to the group's Oxford Bus Company operation. Go-Ahead had previously operated services in the High Wycombe area under the Wycombe Bus name, but sold this operation to Arriva in December 2000.

On 3 June 2018, their 'Link' network became the 'Chiltern Hundreds'. Routes 101/102 link High Wycombe and Uxbridge, route 103 links High Wycombe and Watford, route 104 links High Wycombe and Slough via and Gerrards Cross, and route 105 links Hemel Hempstead with Uxbridge via Amersham, Chesham, Gerrards Cross and the Chalfonts. The network also introduced a frequency of every 15 minutes between High Wycombe and Beaconsfield and a direct link to Wexham Park Hospital from High Wycombe, Beaconsfield and Gerrards Cross.

On 3 June 2018, Route A40 Was re-numbered to 102 but is still part of the Heathrow Airport Holdings. Several Enviro400 MMC replaced the existing Silver Citaros to make up for branding and made it a 15 minute link from High Wycombe to Beaconsfield on all existing "Chiltern Hundred" *Now part of carousel Country* routes.

On 25 July 2022, Route 103 was withdrawn between Watford and Amersham and was rerouted to serve Royal Borough of Windsor and Maidenhead (Mainly Windsor). Carousel buses said that the service was "financially sustainable" and that passenger use was low in the withdrawn section of the route. It also said that Hertfordshire County Council is planning a replacement service. Arriva introduced the replacement named route 336 between Watford and Amersham.

Route 105 operating between Chesham and Uxbridge was withdrawn and came back on the 31st of August 2025 serving the withdrawn Chesham and extending to Chartridge. A timetable change on routes 106/7 between Amersham and Slough kind of replaced it. The link 40 was taken over by Red Rose Travel.

Carousel later announced a Demand Responsive Transit named "PickMeUp" that can allow people to travel between any bus stop in High Wycombe. Later on, it extended up to parts of Flackwell Heath.

As of 8 January 2023, the route 41 from Great Missenden railway station to High Wycombe bus station was transferred to Carousel from Arriva Beds & Bucks (operating under Arriva Shires & Essex); the route was later extended to Amersham. Red Rose took over route 275 between High Wycombe and Oxford.

In May 2024 Arriva proposed the closure of their Aylesbury & High Wycombe depots, with Carousel Buses saying they would take over any withdrawn services. With Carousel reintroducing "Going back to the 30's" routes around Wycombe Town Centre (e.g. 30 Downley Circular, 31 High Wycombe-Sir William Ramsay School, Tyler's Green-Penn-Beaconsfield so on).

In July 2024, Carousel Buses took action to take routes 800 and 850 *Now Riversider* from Arriva's closure in May 2024. Route 800 closed as it merged with 850 to fully serve as one route to Reading via Marlow, Henley-on-Thames, and Central Reading.

In April 2025, Carousel took over a number of Royal Borough of Windsor and Maidenhead and Buckinghamshire Council contracted services in the Maidenhead/Windsor and Chesham areas, significantly expanding their area of operation.

In July 2025, it was announced that new services would be introduced, increasing the number of buses between High Wycombe and Beaconsfield. New route 105 would connect Beaconsfield To the Chalfonts, Amersham and Chesham. In addition, the number of buses on route 103 between High Wycombe and Slough would be increased to every 30 minutes, extending to Windsor every 30 minutes on Mondays to Saturdays and every hour on Sundays. Route 104 would have its Sunday services run hourly between Beaconsfield, The Chalfonts, Gerrards Cross and Uxbridge.

In July 2025, Carousel Buses also celebrated 25 years of operation. The company celebrated this anniversary with an event taking place at their depot in High Wycombe that reunited multiple colleagues and managing directors.

The company was later delivered 9 Alexander Dennis Enviro200s in 2 different sizes. 4 of the buses were painted in a livery specified for bus routes in the Royal Borough of Windsor and Maidenhead and were put to service on routes 3, 3A, 4 and 9, with 3 others being set to operate routes 37 and 10/10A that give links to High Wycombe and Staines. The remaining 2 entered service on "Carousel Country" services around Buckinghamshire and Berkshire.

In October 2026, The company is still going strong with its frequent services and minor delays.

Website
carouselbuses.co.uk
