= Chris Moyes =

Christopher Moyes OBE (26 July 1949 – 12 September 2006) was one of the founders of Go-Ahead Group, one of the United Kingdom's largest transport businesses.

== Career ==
Born in Shropshire and educated at Birkenhead School and Liverpool University, Chris Moyes went on to take a post-graduate degree at Salford University.

Chris Moyes joined the National Bus Company in 1971 as a management trainee. On the privatisation of the National Bus Company in 1987 he was one of the founders of Go-Ahead Group: he became Deputy Chief Executive in 1999 and Chief Executive in December 2004.

He became the Chairman of the Council of Durham University in 2001. He was also Chairman of GoSkills, the transport Sector Skills Council, a body he had been instrumental in founding in 2004.

He was made an Officer of the Order of the British Empire in the 2006 New Year Honours List for services to transport. He was also a Deputy Lieutenant of County Durham.

He resigned from most of his positions in July 2006 due to an undisclosed serious illness and died on 12 September 2006. It was only then reported that he had been seriously ill with a brain tumour since May 2006. At the time of his death Moyes owned 1.96 million shares (4.02%) of Go-Ahead's stock and was amongst its largest shareholders.

== Family ==
He was married to Jan and together they adopted three daughters.
