= Advance Booking Charter =

Advance Booking Charter flights were first introduced in the early 1970s to meet the largely unsatisfied demand for affordable long-haul flights to popular destinations, especially on both sides of the North Atlantic ocean.

The world's first ABC flight was operated on 2 April 1973, by Laker Airways between Manchester and Toronto carrying 250 passengers on one of the airline's newly acquired McDonnell Douglas DC-10 widebodied jet aircraft.

== Background ==
The introduction of ABC flights was an attempt by the airline industry and the aviation authorities in Europe and North America, mainly the United Kingdom, the United States and Canada, to replace the complicated and unworkable "affinity group" charter rules with a more rational set of rules that was easier to implement as well as less open to potential abuse.

In the late 1960s an obscure rule crafted by IATA concerning the permissibility of chartering aircraft to operate flights across the North Atlantic for the sole purpose of carrying so-called "affinity groups" at fares below IATA's officially agreed minimum fare for any given route by the organisation's member airlines through their wholly owned, non-IATA subsidiaries (such as BEA Airtours or BOAC Charters for instance), came to the attention of a determined group of mainly non-IATA airlines, which sought to exploit these legal loopholes for themselves. This group of airlines included many former leading independent British airlines, such as Britannia Airways, British United Airways, Caledonian Airways, Dan-Air and Laker Airways. Some of these wholly privately owned, independent airlines, notably British United Airways, were IATA members themselves. However, at the time IATA was dominated by majority or wholly state-owned "flag carriers", which used that organisation to frame rules that were designed to protect them from what they considered excessive and unwarranted competition by independent airlines.

The relevant rule stipulated that transatlantic charter flights were permissible provided that the only reason to transport a group of passengers who wanted to travel together on the same aircraft was those passengers' shared interest and that all of them were members of the same club, rather than carrying a group of "unconnected" individuals on a specially chartered aircraft whose sole purpose of travelling together on that aircraft was to avail themselves of a cheap flight. That rule furthermore stipulated that anyone who wanted to purchase a ticket for an "affinity group" charter flight needed to book at least three months in advance of the date of travel and be a bona fide, member of an officially recognised organisation. Although some of these "affinity groups" were genuine, an overwhelming majority of these "common interest associations" was fake. The sole purpose of their existence was to sign up as many members as were needed to profitably fill a contemporary long-haul jetliner, usually a Boeing 707, for a transatlantic charter flight by issuing each prospective passenger with a back-dated, bogus membership card of a non-existent organisation, sometimes on the day of departure. In some cases, this was done in the offices of "specialist" travel agencies that had suddenly sprung up on both sides of the Atlantic to cash in on the new "cheap flights bonanza". These travel agents unscrupulously sold thousands of tickets to people falsely representing themselves to the aviation authorities in Britain, the US and Canada as members of an ever-greater variety of imaginary "affinity groups".

As soon as this scam had come to the relevant authorities' attention, they began policing the departure areas of the main departure and arrival airports on both sides of the Atlantic with the aim of catching bogus "affinity group" members and preventing them from boarding their flights. Gatwick's departure lounge used to be one of the most prominent places where these unannounced raids were conducted with increasing regularity. As a result of these actions an increasing number of passengers hoping to board a cheap "affinity group" charter was denied boarding their aircraft. Some flights were said to have departed without a single passenger on board. There were also reports about raids the authorities conducted on a particular airline/charterer only after having been tipped off by an IATA member or by a fellow independent competitor. In addition, the authorities fined the airlines operating these flights for each bogus passenger whose name appeared on the passenger list of an "affinity group" charter. In some cases these fines amounted to several thousand pounds sterling/US dollars/Canadian dollars.

== ABC flight rules ==
In the end, the authorities as well as the industry admitted that the absurd "affinity group" system worked to nobody's satisfaction. They also admitted that the real purpose of travel of an overwhelming majority of those who were travelling under the old "affinity group" rules was to avail themselves of a cheap flight. It was therefore decided to scrap the entire system and to replace it with a new system that recognised as well as legalised the growing demand for cheap transatlantic air travel at fares below the official IATA minimum fares. This was also the time Laker Airways was battling the authorities on both sides of the Atlantic to gain approval for its revolutionary "Skytrain" low-fare, "no frills" transatlantic scheduled service that it intended to operate between London and New York City on a daily basis.

The resulting compromise led to the framing of a set of new "Advance Booking Charter" (ABC) flight rules that did away with all of the onerous rules that had governed "affinity group" charters other than a four-week advance booking period (subsequently reduced to two weeks).

However, the subsequent introduction of Laker Airways' "Skytrain" operation on key transatlantic routes between the UK and the US as well as the competitive response this triggered from other airlines, including many long-established IATA members, resulted in a growing range of low fares being offered on most scheduled services on a year-round basis. The established IATA carriers were able to afford these low fares by cross-subsidising them with their far more expensive premium (mostly business class) fares. This undermined the long-term economics as well as the popularity of ABC flights to such an extent that these flights ceased to be viable by the mid-1980s.

Most of the airlines that were major operators of "affinity group" charters/ABC flights had in fact already begun abandoning this market with the advent of "Skytrain" in the late 1970s. At the time British Caledonian, for example, whose predecessor Caledonian Airways had at one time been the dominant "affinity group" charter carrier across the Atlantic with a market share of 22.5%, decided to pull out of the increasingly unprofitable ABC market altogether to fully concentrate on building up transatlantic scheduled services as part of its effort to increase its worldwide presence as a major scheduled airline.

== Notes and references ==
Notes

Bibliography

- "Fares In Flux", Flight International, 4 June 1970
- "Affinity on the Atlantic", Flight International, p. 239, 15 February 1972
