= Martin Ballinger =

British businessman

Martin Andrew Stanley Ballinger (19 November 1943 – 28 February 2007) was one of the founders of Go-Ahead Group, one of the United Kingdom's largest transport companies.

== Career ==
Born in Peterborough and educated at the Salesian School at Chertsey and Imperial College, London, Martin Ballinger qualified as a management accountant while working at the National Bus Company. He became a General Manager there in 1982. On the privatisation of the National Bus Company in 1987 he founded Go-Ahead Group in a management buyout and, as its first Chief Executive, led its initial public offering on the London Stock Exchange in 1994, and built it into one of the United Kingdom's largest transport businesses.

Ballinger retired from Go-Ahead Group in May 2004. In retirement Ballinger became Chairman of the Newcastle upon Tyne Hospitals NHS Trust and Chairman of Northgate.

Ballinger lived at Bolam Hall (the former home of the Beresford family) in Northumberland. He died at the Royal Victoria Infirmary in Newcastle upon Tyne on 28 February 2007 and, following a funeral at St Mary's Cathedral, Newcastle upon Tyne, he was buried at Bolam Churchyard in Bolam. Following his death, his successor at the Go-Ahead Group commented on Ballinger's significant contribution to the development of the UK passenger transport industry.

The Ballinger family, led by Martin Ballinger, became one of the wealthiest families in the North East of England. The Ballinger Charitable Trust, founded by Martin and Diana Ballinger, is a major a major vehicle for philanthropy in the North East of England, and remains one of the largest grant-making foundations there.

== Family ==
In 1968, he married Diana Susan Edgoose and together they went on to have a daughter, and then a son.
