= Connecting Stockholm =

Swedish public transport operator

- Industry: Railway
- Founded: 2 November 2025
- Headquarters: Stockholm, Sweden
- Parent: Go-Ahead Group (55%); ComfortDelGro (45%)
- Website: www.connectingstockholm

Connecting Stockholm has operated the Stockholm Metro since November 2025. It is a joint venture owned by Go-Ahead Group (55%) and ComfortDelGro (45%).

== History ==
In January 2024 Connecting Stockholm was awarded the 11-year contract to operate the Stockholm Metro. It took over from MTR on 2 November 2025. After unsuccessful bidder Keolis launched a legal challenge, in October 2024 Region Stockholm awarded Connecting Stockholm a provisional two-year contract pending completion of the legal process that would commence on 2 November 2025 on similar terms to the original deal.

On November 21, 2024, Region Stockholm finalised a permanent contract with Connecting Stockholm to run the Stockholm Metro. This decision followed the Court of Appeal's refusal to allow an appeal from Keolis on November 5, 2024. The contract is worth about 40 billion SEK (€3.5 billion), described as the largest non-military public procurement in the world.

The agreement also includes incentives for good performance in areas like punctuality and customer satisfaction.
