= Thames Travel =

Oxfordshire bus operator

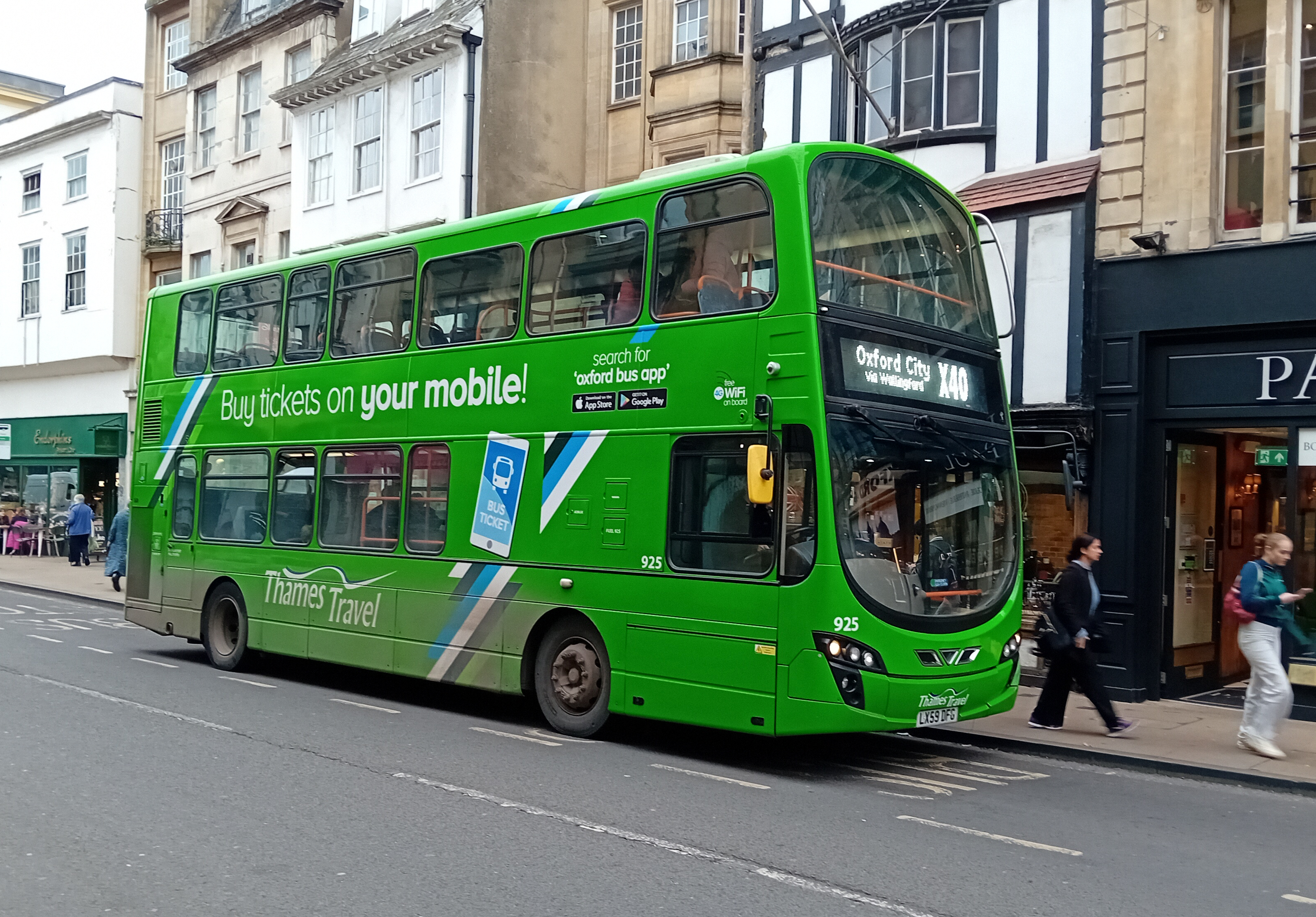
- Wright Eclipse Gemini 2 bodied Volvo B9TL on Oxford High Street in October 2024
- Parent: Go-Ahead Group
- Founded: 14 April 1998; 28 years ago
- Headquarters: Collett, Southmead Park, Didcot, Oxfordshire OX11 7ET
- Service area: South Oxfordshire; Berkshire; Cherwell
- Service type: Bus services
- Destinations: Abingdon, Berinsfield, Bicester, Carterton, Chipping Norton, Faringdon, Goring, Didcot, Henley-on-Thames, Lower Heyford, Oxford, Newbury, Reading, Upper Heyford Wallingford, Wantage, Witney
- Fleet: 100 (September 2026)
- Chief executive: Luke Marion
- Website: Thames Travel

Thames Travel is a bus operator serving the southern part of the English county of Oxfordshire. It is based in Didcot and is a subsidiary of the Go-Ahead Group's Go Thames Valley operation alongside Oxford Bus Company, City Sightseeing Oxford and Pearces Coaches, all also of Oxfordshire, Carousel Buses of Buckinghamshire and Pulhams Coaches of Gloucestershire, having been purchased as a 35-vehicle independent operator in May 2011.

== Branded routes ==
=== River Rapids ===
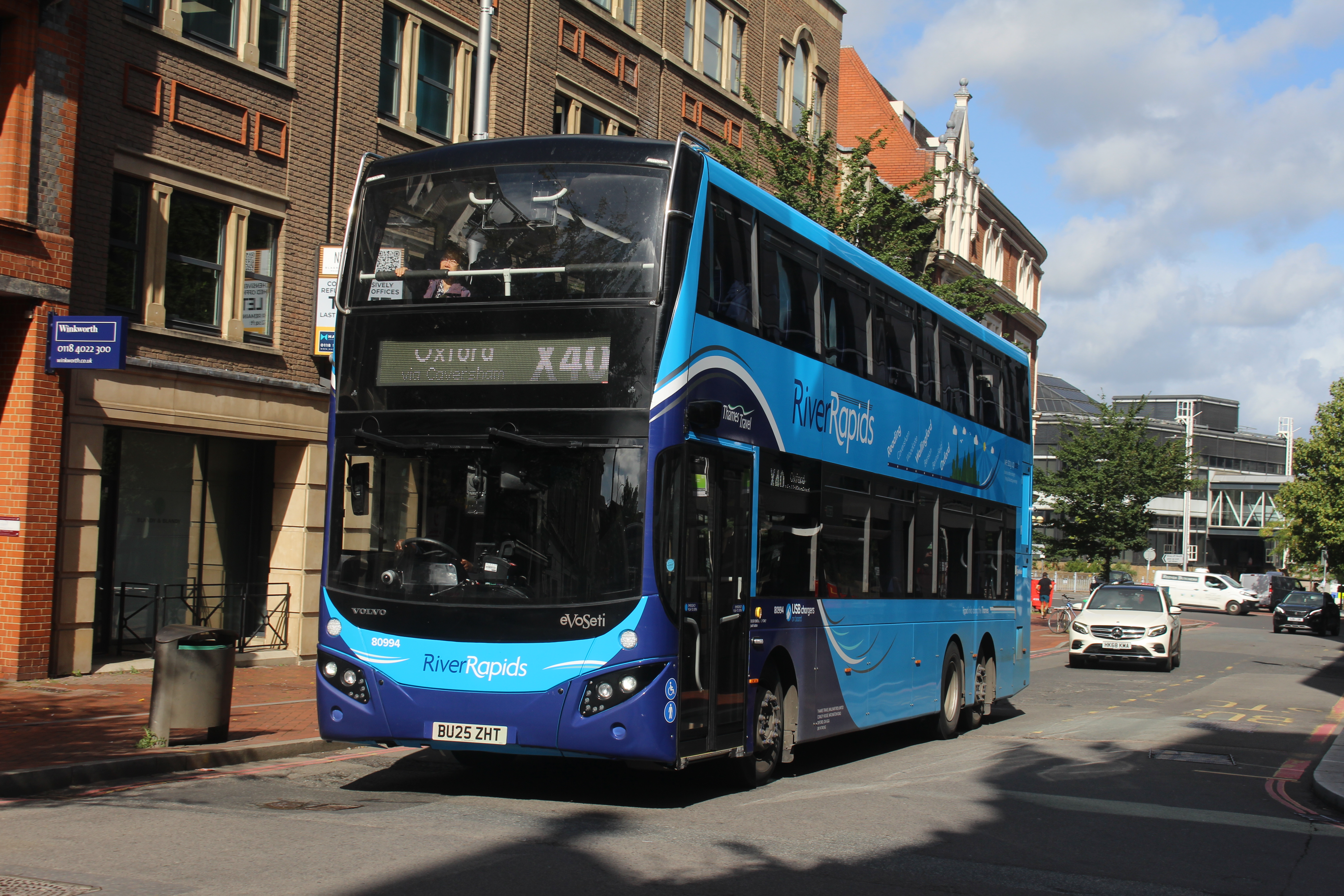
An MCV EvoSeti bodied Volvo B8L in River Rapids livery on route X40 in Reading in September 2025

Early in its history Thames Travel began a direct bus service between Oxford and Reading via Wallingford. This comprises two routes: the X40 which runs via Woodcote, and the X39 which bypasses Woodcote. The company also operates a service to Henley-on-Thames and Wallingford, which until 2017 was numbered 139, ran seven days a week and terminated at Wallingford.

At the end of October 2017 Thames Travel withdrew the Sunday service from route 139, but extended the Monday to Saturday service from Wallingford to Oxford and renumbered the revised route X38. It retimetabled the X38, X39 and X40 to provide a service every 20 minutes between Wallingford and Oxford. It has branded the three routes "River Rapids" and applied prominent graphics to its dedicated fleet to promote it.

The X38 has since been withdrawn and replaced by the 33 running from Abingdon to Henley-on-Thames via Didcot & Wallingford, and the X39 has also been withdrawn with the X40 now running every 20 minutes (half-hourly on weekends), meaning all services go via Woodcote.

=== Connector ===
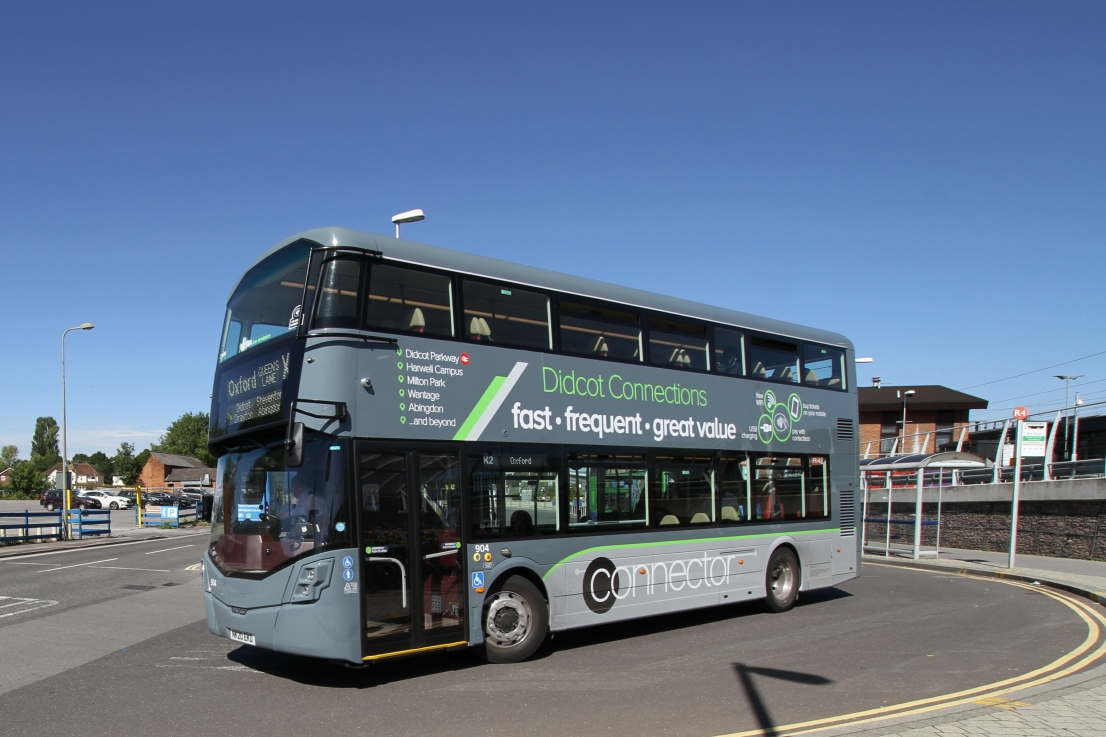
A Wright StreetDeck bus in Thames Travel Connector livery at Didcot Parkway

The Connector brand is used for Didcot focused services, and covers routes between Didcot and Oxford, Abingdon, Henley-on-Thames, Wallingford, Wantage, Grove, East Hanney, Newbury, Harwell Campus, JR Hospital, Great Western Park and Milton Park.

The Connector brand also covers the ST1 service, which operates between Oxford and Harwell Campus.

The Connector routes have a dedicated fleet in a livery of two-tone grey with a light green coachline, and "Connector" graphics promoting the route.

== Notable incidents ==
Thames Travel vehicles have been involved in three major accidents, reported in the local media. All were on the A4074 road, nicknamed locally the "13 bends of death".

The first accident was on 21 July 2006. A 26-year-old woman was killed when her car collided head-on with a Thames Travel bus. It was found that the woman was taking avoiding action to prevent her car from colliding with two cars that were coming towards her, whose drivers had been recklessly overtaking numerous other cars before the accident. As a result of the collision both vehicles caught fire and were completely destroyed. The two brothers arrested after the incident were convicted and jailed for a total of 15 years for the accident.

The second accident was on 28 January 2008. A Thames Travel single-decker bus collided in fog with a Land Rover that was turning off the road across the bus's path. The Land Rover landed on its side; the bus in a ditch. The accident was on the A4074 at its junction with the B4526 road. Five people were injured.

The third accident was on 14 October 2014. A Thames Travel bus collided with a van on the A4074, leaving the bus driver and a passenger injured.

== See also ==
- List of bus companies in the United Kingdom
