= Gatwick Handling =

Defunct English aircraft services company

GHI Ltd
- Type: Aircraft ground handling
- Industry: Aviation (Outsourcing)
- Founded: 1972 (as Gatwick Handling Ltd)
- Defunct: 2000 (merged with Midland Airport Services, British Midland Handling Services and Reed Aviation to form Aviance UK
- Headquarters: London Gatwick Airport
- Key people: Sir Ivor Broom; Sir Robert Hardingham; Frank Horridge; Graham Hutchinson; Angus J. Kinnear; Cliff Nunn; Michael Newman; Martin O'Regan; Peter Ryan; John T. Seear; Alan J. Snudden; David J. Quinn; Charles R. Whyte; Ken Smith
- Products: Aircraft ground handling Airport lounges
- Parent: Davies and Newman Holdings (1972–1992); Laker Airways (Services) (1972–1982); Northwest Airlines (1983–1998); Delta Air Lines (1984–1998); British Airways (1992–1993); Go-Ahead Group (1998–2000)

Gatwick Handling Limited was an aircraft ground handling agent headquartered at London Gatwick Airport.

Gatwick Handling was originally established in the late-1960s as a new company jointly owned by Airbourne Aviation and Messrs Metcalfe and Foukes. The company's liquidation soon after its formation resulted in ownership passing to Davies and Newman (D&N), parent company of the British independent (Note: independent from government-owned corporations) airline Dan-Air. D&N's search for a co-owner for its new ground handling unit led to the sale of a 50 per cent stake to Laker Airways (Services), an associate company of former Gatwick-based UK independent airline Laker Airways which was a contemporary competitor of Dan-Air.

Gatwick Handling's official appointment as an airport concessionaire occurred in early 1972 following the signing of an agreement between the British Airports Authority (BAA), Dan-Air and Laker Airways. Under this agreement, the BAA licensed Gatwick Handling to conduct ground handling operations at London Gatwick on behalf of third parties.

In addition to assuming responsibility for handling all Dan-Air and Laker flights at Gatwick, a growing number of third-party airlines appointed Gatwick Handling their handling agent at the airport.

Laker Airways's demise in early 1982 brought about a change in ownership that initially saw D&N gain 100% control of Gatwick Handling and the subsequent sale of the 50% stake previously owned by an associate company of the defunct airline sold on to US carriers Northwest Airlines and Delta Air Lines.

In the late-1980s, Gatwick Handling extended its geographical coverage of the UK to other airports, leading to establishment of GH Manchester and GH Stansted respectively.

Dan-Air's takeover by British Airways (BA) in late 1992 divided Gatwick Handling's ownership between Northwest and Delta.

In 1994, Gatwick Handling extended its geographical coverage to Ghana in West Africa. To give it a more international image, the company abbreviated its name to GHI (for Gatwick Handling International).

In 1998, Go-Ahead Group replaced Northwest and Delta as GHI's owner.

In 2000, Go-ahead merged GHI with its other UK aircraft ground handling operations, Midland Airport Services, British Midland Handling Services and Reed Aviation, under the Aviance UK brand.

== History ==
As a private, unsubsidised airline that for most of its existence mainly operated low-margin, predominantly seasonal charter flights due to government restrictions on scheduled services, Dan-Air needed to minimise overheads to ensure its profitability. One way to do this was to outsource its ground handling to a third-party handler.

In the late-1960s, Dan-Air contracted its ground handling at Gatwick to Airbourne Aviation, an independent handler owned by a Mr Herbert Snowball, who provided staff to the airline's ground handling unit at the airport.

To keep pace with the growth of Dan-Air's Gatwick operation and to keep the airline's contract, as well as to win more third-party business at the airport, Herbert Snowball partnered Messrs Metcalfe and Foukes to form a new company named Gatwick Handling. Poor results forced Gatwick Handling to cease trading and go into liquidation within a short period of time, putting Dan-Air and the other airlines who had given the now-defunct company their ground handling business at Gatwick in a difficult position. To secure the check-in desks Dan-Air had contracted from Gatwick Handling and to minimise additional costs arising from its handling agent's failure, as well as to avoid confusing the travelling public who had already been informed by tour operators and travel agents to report to Gatwick Handling for check-in, Dan-Air's parent D&N agreed with BAA and the failed company's other creditors to continue trading under the same name in return for settling outstanding debts.

Dan-Air's requirement for additional check-in desks at Gatwick resulted in discussions about the formation of a new joint handling company with fellow independent airline and airport resident Caledonian Airways, whose expansion had led to a requirement for more check-in desks at the airport as well. Although talks between both parties made good progress, the latter backed out of a deal following its successful bid to take over British United Airways (BUA) in late-November 1970. As Britain's biggest independent airline and leading independent scheduled carrier, as well as Gatwick's largest resident airline, BUA already had a well-developed ground handling infrastructure at the airport. This enabled it to handle all of its own flights in-house and provide ground handling services to third parties. For Caledonian this meant that it no longer required the services of a third-party ground handler at Gatwick. As a consequence of Caledonian's change in circumstances, D&N needed to find a new partner who was willing to co-own the yet to be formed joint handling company. An expression of interest from Laker Airways founder and majority owner Freddie Laker, who wanted his airline to attain a greater degree of autonomy at its home airport, ended D&N's search for a partner to share control of a joint handling company.

BAA agreed to award the new company a concession to become one of the airport's appointed ground handlers. This was followed by the official signing of the contract in February 1972. Signatories included Dan-Air managing director Alan Snudden, airport director David Livingstone and Freddie Laker. The contractual period for the licence (Note: BAA operated a strict licensing regime for ground handlers at Gatwick to avoid a proliferation of companies and destructive competition) covering Gatwick Handling's appointment as an airport concessionaire was ten years. That arrangement afforded Gatwick Handling security of tenure to invest in new ground handling equipment to enable Gatwick's airlines to serve the airport with the then latest-generation widebodied aircraft.

The expiry of Gatwick Handling's original ten-year licence in February 1982 coincided with the collapse of half-owner Laker Airways the same month. Initially, this resulted in D&N taking full control of Gatwick Handling. However, the BAA insisted that other airlines should become additional shareholders to prevent D&N subsidiary Dan-Air from deriving an unfair advantage from its sister company's status as monopoly provider of third-party ground handling services at Gatwick Airport. US carriers Northwest and Delta, whose transatlantic flights used Gatwick as their London terminal as a result of restrictions on access to Heathrow implemented in the Bermuda II UK–US bilateral agreement and whose ground handling in London had been contracted to Gatwick Handling, each acquired a 25% stake in the ground handler in 1983 and 1984, respectively. These moves ensured Gatwick Handling's continuity and stability. They also resulted in the new shareholders replacing the former Laker representatives on the ground handler's board of directors with their own people.

To reduce its dependence on Gatwick and to take advantage of new business opportunities at other UK airports in the late-1980s, Gatwick Handling established GH Manchester and GH Stansted to begin ground handling operations at Manchester and Stansted respectively. (The former took over the operations of Manchester Handling, (Note: not to be confused with Manchester Handling Limited, an existing provider of aircraft handling services at Manchester Airport) an associate company of Dan-Air formed in the mid-80s.)

Another change in Gatwick Handling's ownership occurred, when BA acquired D&N along with some of the assets of Dan-Air for £1 in late-October 1992. As the UK flag carrier handled all of its Gatwick flights in-house and did not require Gatwick Handling's check-in desks, this resulted in disposal of the stake it had inherited in the ground handling company to remaining shareholders Delta and Northwest in 1993, thus dividing the ground handler's entire share capital between the two American carriers.

A new international expansion strategy that saw Gatwick Handling launch its first overseas ground handling operation in Ghana, West Africa, in 1994, replaced the by then official Gatwick Handling International name with its abbreviated form GHI.

GHI's ownership changed again in 1998, when Delta and Northwest sold out to the Go-Ahead Group.

Following GHI's merger with Midland Airport Services, British Midland Handling Services and Reed Aviation in 2000, all of Go-Ahead's UK aviation interests were rebranded as Aviance UK.

== Notes and citations ==
Notes

Citations
