= Servisair =

Former British aviation service company

- Type: Subsidiary
- Industry: Aviation (Outsourcing)
- Founded: 1952
- Defunct: 2013
- Fate: Acquired
- Successor: Swissport
- Headquarters: 175 worldwide
- Area served: Worldwide
- Products: Aircraft ground handling Airport lounges
- Revenue: €4.05 billion (2007)
- Number of employees: 22,000
- Parent: Swissport
- Website: www.servisair.com

Servisair was an aircraft ground handling company which was acquired and merged into Swissport and partly the Nordic-based Aviator Airport Alliance in 2014.

It had operations in 175 airports worldwide with its head office in the Servisair House in Runcorn, England.

== History ==
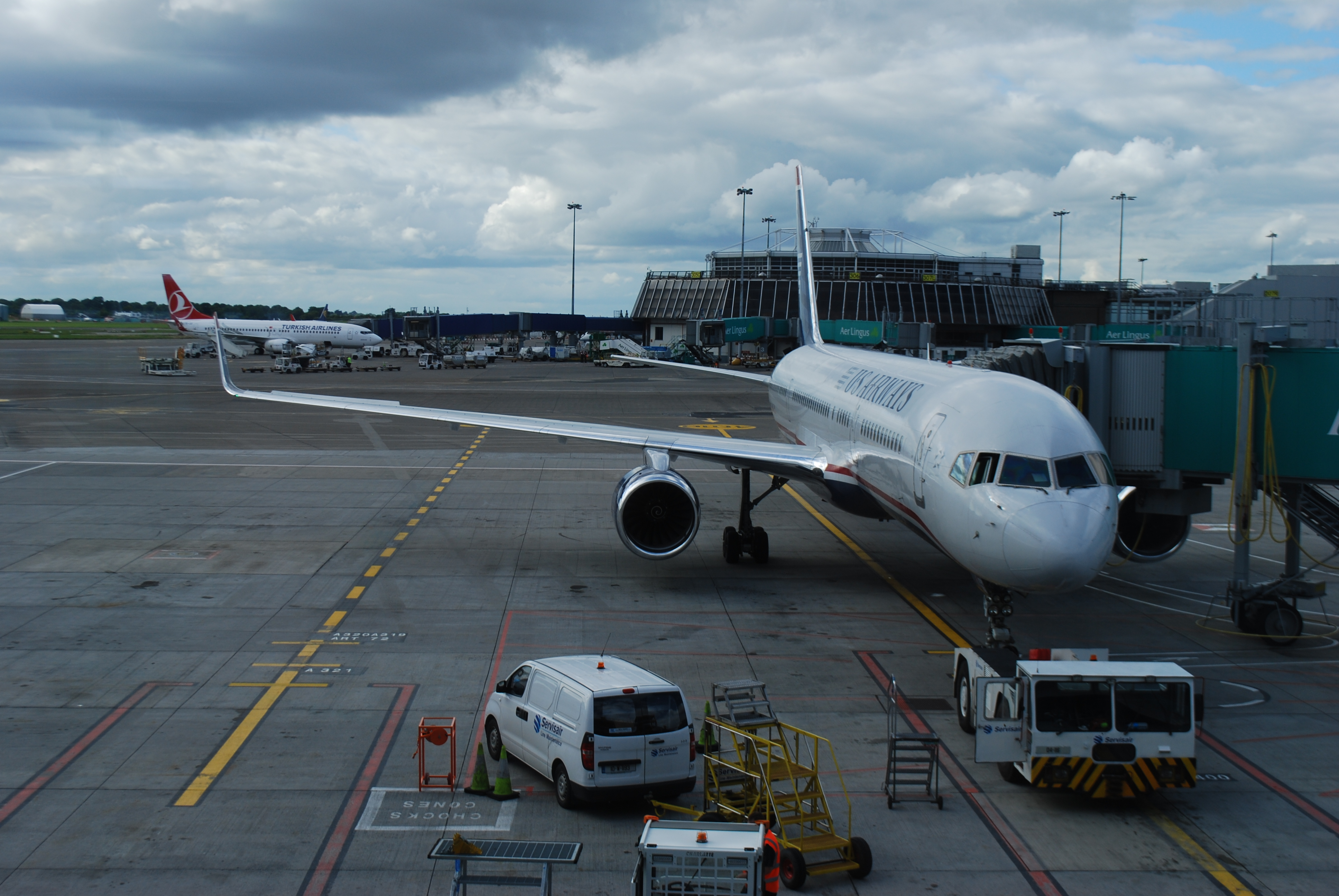
Servisair aircraft tow truck and van at Dublin Airport

At one time its head office was in Bramhall, Stockport.

In January 1999 Amey launched a hostile takeover for Servisair. In March 1999 Penauille Polyservices acquired Servisair. Penauille had its head office in Boissy St Léger.

In 2001 Lufthansa sold 51% of its ground handling subsidiary, GlobeGround, to Penauille Polyservices. The remaining Lufthansa shares in GlobeGround went to Penauille on 30 June 2002.

As Servisair/GlobeGround (GlobeGround GmbH) its head office was in Raunheim, Germany.

On 19 January 2006 Servisair/GlobeGround became Penauille Servisair.

At a later point, as Penauille Servisair, the company had its head office in Atlantic House, Atlas Business Park, Manchester.

In July 2007 Penauille Polyservices and CFF Recycling merged to form Derichebourg.

In May 2010 Servisair completed its merger with Aviance UK.

In May 2012 Transat sold Handlex, its handling brand, to Servisair.

In July 2013 it was announced that the Derichebourg has reached an agreement to sell Servisair to Swissport. Servisair's operations were merged into Swissport by December 2013. As a result, Swissport became the largest ground handler in the world with almost 300 locations around the globe. To approve the merger EU mandated that operations in Birmingham, Helsinki, London Gatwick and Newcastle were to be sold off to a third party to not damage competition in those airports. An agreement was made between Swissport and Aviator Airport Alliance to fulfil this requirement.

== Operations ==
Servisair divides operations into nine service lines (although not all services are available at every location):

- Ground Handling
- Cargo
- Fueling
- Lounges
- Airport Agencies
- Central De-Icing
- Snow Removal
- Transportation
- Aircraft Cleaning
