= Lake (surname) =

Lake is an English surname.

For the numerous British and Irish baronets of that name, see:

- Lake baronets.

Other notable people with the surname include:

- Agnes Lake (1887–1972), British suffragette
- Alan Lake (1940–1984), British actor
- Alice Lake (1895–1967), American actress
- Anthony Lake (born 1939), former U.S. National Security Advisor
- Arthur Lake (disambiguation), several people
- Bill Lake (fl. 1974–present), Canadian actor
- Brandon Lake (born 1990), American worship musician
- Brian Lake (born 1982), Australian rules footballer
- Carnell Lake (born 1967), American football player
- Campbell Lake (footballer) (born 2004), Australian rules footballer
- Charles H. Lake (1879–1958), American educator and author
- Chris Lake (born 1982), English house music DJ and producer
- David Lake (born 1992), American educator
- Dayan Lake (born 1997), American football player
- Denton D. Lake (1887–1941), New York politician
- Eustace Lake (died 2026), Antigua and Barbuda Labour Party politician
- Florence Lake (1904–1980), American actress and sister of the actor Arthur Lake
- Forrest Lake (1868–1939), American politician, banker, investor, and convict
- George Hingston Lake (1847–1900) politician of South Australia
- George Lake (footballer) (1889–1918), English footballer
- Greg Lake (1947–2016), British bass guitarist and singer
- H. Rafael Lake (1894–1958), American architect
- Harry Lake (disambiguation), several people
- Iona Lake (born 1993), British steeplechaser
- I. Beverly Lake Jr. (1934–2019), American judge, lawyer, and politician
- I. Beverly Lake Sr. (1906–1996), American judge and lawyer
- John Lake (disambiguation), several people
- James A. Lake (born 1941), American evolutionary biologist
- James Andrew Trehane Lake (c. 1840 – 1876) politician of South Australia
- Josée Lake (born 1963 or 1964), Canadian paralympic swimmer and thalidomide survivor
- Junior Lake (born 1990), Dominican baseball player
- Kerin Lake (born 1990), Welsh rugby union player
- Kirsopp Lake (1872–1946), British New Testament scholar
- Lauren Lake (born 1969), family lawyer, author, television presenter, interior designer, and background vocalist
- Leonard Lake (1945–1985), American serial killer
- Molly Lake (1900–1986), British dancer, choreographer
- Nathan Lake (born 1992), English squash player
- Patricia Lake (1923–1993), American actress and socialite
- Paul Lake (born 1968), English footballer
- Philip Lake (1865–1949), English geologist and palaeontologist
- Phipps W. Lake (1789–1860), Wisconsin politician
- Quentin Lake (born 1999), American football player
- Ricki Lake (born 1968), American actress and television personality
- Simon Lake (1866–1945), American naval engineer and inventor
- Steve Lake (born 1957), American baseball player
- Stuart Lake (baseball) (born 1971), American college baseball coach
- Suzy Lake (born 1947), Canadian artist
- Veronica Lake (1922–1973), American film actress
- Wells Lake (politician) (1772–1839), York politician
- Dame Louise Lake-Tack (born 1944), Antiguan politician

== See also ==
- Laker (surname)
- Gary Lakes (1950–2025), American opera heldentenor
