= Molla =

Molla may refer to:

== People ==
- Abdul Quader Molla (1948–2013), Bangladeshi Islamist leader, writer and politician convicted and executed for war crimes
- Abdur Razzak Molla (born 1944), Indian politician
- Atukuri Molla (1440–1530), Telugu poet
- Belete Molla, Ethiopian politician
- Gaetano Molla (1845–1894), Italian impresario, conductor, pianist and opera director
- Getaneh Molla (born 1994), Ethiopian long-distance runner
- Gianna Beretta Molla (1922–1962), Italian Roman Catholic pediatrician who refused a life-threatening abortion and a hysterectomy
- Giasuddin Molla (born 1956), Indian politician
- Jordi Mollà (born 1968), Spanish actor
- José Mollá (born 1967), Argentine businessman
- Manik Hossain Molla (born 1999), Bangladeshi footballer
- Moslem Ali Molla, East Pakistan member of parliament
- Oleg Molla (born 1986), Moldovan footballer
- Rahamatulla Molla (born 1987), Indian former athlete
- Saokat Molla (born 1971), Indian politician
- Shlomo Molla (born 1965), Israeli politician
- Solomon Molla (born 1987), Ethiopian athlete
- Zaman Molla (born 1979), Iranian former table tennis player
- Molla Mallory (1884–1959), Norwegian tennis player
- Molla Wagué (born 1991), Malian footballer

== Other uses ==
- Molla, Markazi, a village in Markazi Province, Iran
- Mullah (Islamic clergy), alternative spelling
- Molla (skipper), a skipper butterfly genus
