= International rankings of Nigeria =

These are the international rankings of Nigeria:

== Economy ==
- The Heritage Foundation and The Wall Street Journal 2012 Index of Economic Freedom ranked 116
- 2010 KOF Index of Globalization ranked 93
- World Bank 2012 Ease of doing business index ranked 133
- UNDP 2019 Human Development Report ranked 158 out of 189
- WIPO, 2026 Global Innovation Index ranked 118 out of 139

== Health ==
- International Food Policy Research Institute 2011 Global Hunger Index ranked 40

Most food that is eaten in day-to-day life in Nigeria fall in food taboos and superstitions thereby causing malnutrition for children as people consume low nutrients. Eating habit has long been controlled by belief about what is good to eat.

== Politics ==
- Fund for Peace 2019 Fragile States Index ranked 14 out of 178 (N/B 1 is most fragile and 178 is most stable)
- Transparency International 2011 Corruption Perceptions Index ranked 143
- Reporters Without Borders 2011-2012 Press Freedom Index ranked 126
- Economist Intelligence Unit 2011 Democracy Index ranked 119
- Property Rights Alliance 2008 International Property Rights Index ranked 107
- Georgetown Institute for Women Peace and Security 2019 Women, Peace and Security Index ranked 145 out of 167

== Society ==
- Economist Intelligence Unit: Quality-of-life index ranked 108
- Economist Intelligence Unit: 2013 Where-to-be-born Index, ranked 80 out of 80
