= La comunidad =

La comunidad may refer to:

- La comunidad (agency), an advertising agency
- La comunidad (film), a 2000 Spanish film
