= Leslie Bradshaw =

American businesswoman

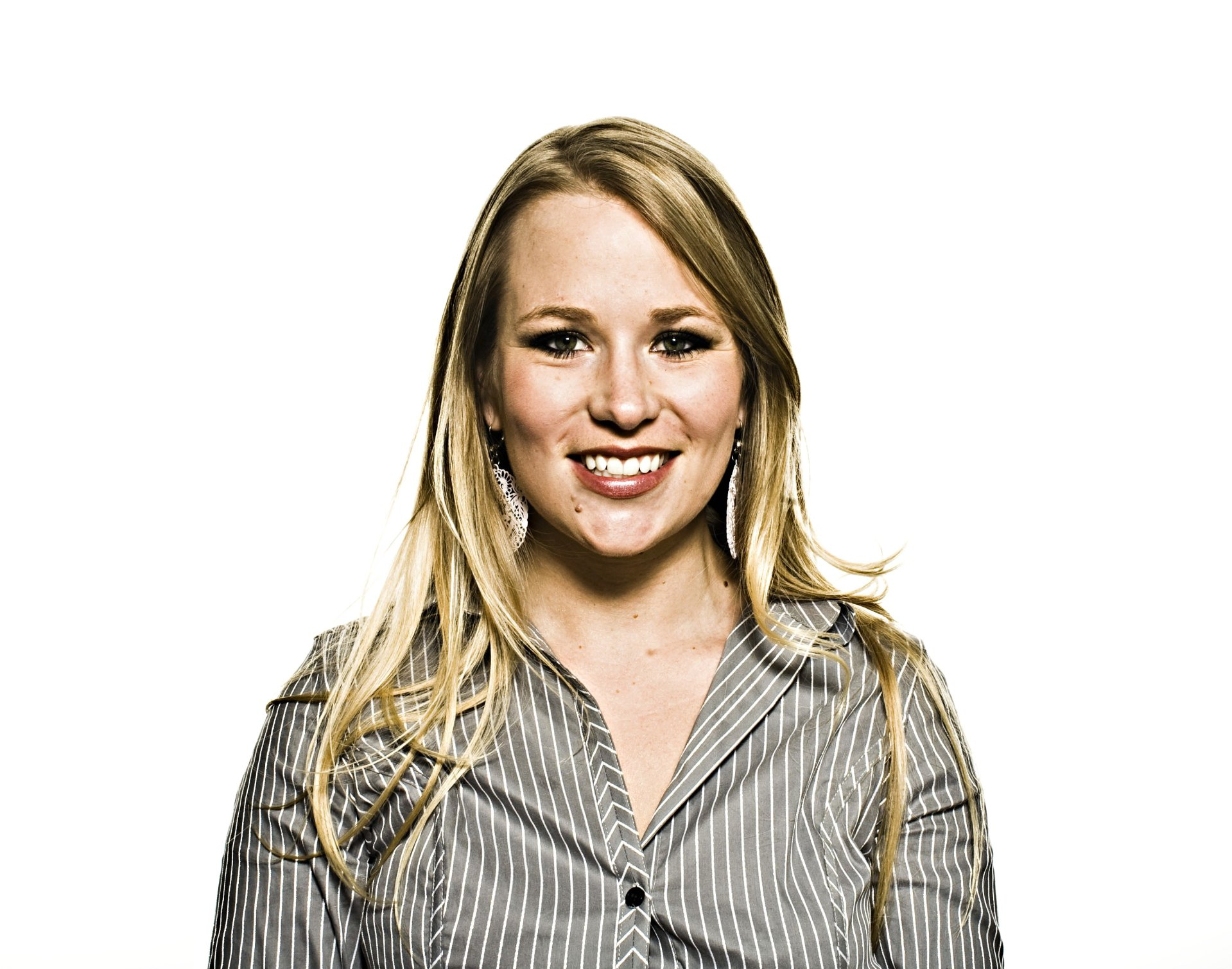
- Born: 1982 (age 43–44); Carson City, Nevada
- Education: University of Chicago
- Organization: Phi Beta Kappa Society
- Known for: JESS3
- Website: lesliebradshaw.com

Leslie Ann Bradshaw, an American businesswoman, is the former chief operating officer, president and co-founder of JESS3. She received recognition for her work at JESS3, including being named by Fast Company as one of the top female executives in the technology industry. Bradshaw is a partner in her family's vineyards, Bradshaw Vineyards. In January 2013, she became the chief operating officer of technology startup Guide, which has since folded.

== Early life and education ==
Bradshaw was born in Carson City, Nevada and spent her early years on a family farm in Oregon. She studied economics, gender and anthropology at the University of Chicago and graduated in 2004 with a B.A. as a Phi Beta Kappa graduate.

== Career ==
=== Early career ===
Bradshaw's early career in communications included a producing role at The McLaughlin Group and new media projects with C-SPAN and National Journal. She began working in social media while at her second job in Washington, D.C., when she began monitoring Facebook for a client as none of her colleagues had access to the site at that time. Bradshaw built on this advantage by developing her knowledge of social media, in particular through early adoption of new platforms.

=== JESS3 ===
In 2007, Bradshaw and Jesse Thomas co-founded JESS3, a creative agency specializing in social media marketing, branding, web design and data visualization Bradshaw was the president and chief operating officer, managing the company's operations and consulting on social media engagement strategies for companies including Nike and Intel. According to a 2011 profile, Bradshaw "played a key role" in increasing revenues at JESS3 by 4000% from 2007 to 2011. Under her leadership the firm grew to over 27 employees based principally in the United States and United Kingdom. As of October 2011, major JESS3 clients have included Samsung, Facebook, Google and The Economist. Bradshaw left JESS3 in December 2012.

=== Guide ===
In January 2013, Bradshaw joined Guide, a technology startup developing an app to translate text from online news sources and blogs into streaming audio and video. She is the company's chief operating officer.

=== Other roles ===
Bradshaw speaks on social media and its impact on design.

She is also involved in the management and operations of her family's vineyard, Bradshaw Vineyards, in Oregon's Willamette Valley. She helped to establish the vineyard and is a partner in the business.

=== Awards and recognition ===
Bradshaw has received recognition from industry press, including being named as one of Fast Company's "Most Influential Women in Technology 2011" and The Wall Street Journal Fins’ "Top Women in Tech Under 30". In 2011, was named a "Tech Titan" by The Washingtonian along with JESS3 co-founder Jesse Thomas, and by Terra as one of the top women in technology. In 2012, Bradshaw’s work at JESS3 led Inc. to name her one of the top 30 entrepreneurs under 30. Also that year, she was featured by Mashable in its list of 44 "accomplished female founders".
