= Laker (surname) =

Laker is a surname. Notable people with the name include:

- Barbara Laker, American journalist
- Freddie Laker (1922–2006), English airline entrepreneur
- Freddie A. Laker, British-American entrepreneur
- Jim Laker (1922–1986), English cricketer
- Peter Laker (1926–2014), English cricketer and journalist
- Tim Laker (born 1969), American baseball coach and former player

== See also ==
- Victoria Meyer-Laker (born 1988), British professional rower
- Lake (surname)
