= Freddie Laker =

English airline entrepreneur (1922–2006)

Sir Freddie Laker
- Born: Frederick Alfred Laker; 6 August 1922; Canterbury, Kent, England
- Died: 9 February 2006 (aged 83); Hollywood, Florida, U.S.
- Occupations: Founder and chairman of Laker Airways, adviser of Virgin Atlantic
- Spouses: Joan Laker (m. 1942–1968) Rose Marie Black (m. 1968–1975) Patricia Gates (m. 1975–1982) Jacqueline Harvey (m. 1985–2006)
- Children: 4

Sir Frederick Alfred Laker (6 August 1922 – 9 February 2006) was an English airline entrepreneur, best known for founding Laker Airways in 1966, which went bankrupt in 1982. Known as Freddie Laker, he was one of the first airline owners to adopt the "low cost / no-frills" airline business model that has since proven to be successful worldwide when employed by companies such as Ryanair, Southwest Airlines, easyJet, Norwegian Air, and AirAsia.

== Biography ==
Laker came from Canterbury in Kent, and attended the Simon Langton Grammar School for Boys, before starting work in aviation with Short Brothers in Rochester. He was a member of the Air Transport Auxiliary during and immediately after the Second World War (1941–46).

He then worked briefly for British European Airways (BEA) and London Aero Motor Services (LAMS). Having borrowed £38,000 from a wealthy friend to top up his own savings of £4,500, he subsequently went into business as a war-surplus aircraft dealer. The Soviet blockade of West Berlin in 1948–49, during which all available aircraft were needed to fly essential supplies into West Berlin, allowed his business to flourish, as this provided more than a year's work for his planes and employees almost immediately. During this period Laker often flew the aircraft himself.

By 1954, Channel Air Bridge, his second airline venture, was flying cars and their owners in Bristol Freighters from Southend Airport (Rochford) to Calais.

In 1958, he sold Air Charter, Aviation Traders and Channel Air Bridge to Airwork. All three companies joined the Airwork group in 1959. Following the Airwork–Hunting-Clan merger in 1960, he became managing director of British United Airways.

He left British United in 1965 and formed his own Laker Airways, in 1966, initially operating charter flights with a pair of turboprop planes acquired second-hand from British Overseas Airways Corporation (BOAC). The livery was a mixture of black and red with a bold LAKER logo on the tailplane. He offered a new, revolutionary concept of inexpensive air travel, requiring passengers to purchase their tickets on the day of travel, and to buy any food they wanted on the flight. These flights were operated by Laker Airways and marketed under the Skytrain trademark.

He was knighted in 1977, the year after the successful launch of Skytrain, in recognition of his services to the airline industry.

He received an honorary degree from the University of Strathclyde in 1981.

Laker divided his final years between his waterfront home in Princess Isle, Grand Bahama Island, where he kept his yacht, The Lady Jacqueline, and Florida, US. Laker died at the age of 83 in a suburban hospital in Hollywood in Florida, following complications from cardiac surgery to implant a pacemaker. He was survived by his fourth wife, Jacqueline Harvey, a former airline hostess he married in 1985, and by two of his children. His daughter, Elaine, was by his first wife Joan with whom he also had a son, Kevin, who died in 1965 at the age of 17 after crashing a sports car Freddie had given him for his birthday. His son Freddie Allen Laker – also a successful entrepreneur – was born to his third wife, Patricia Gates, with whom he also had another son who died in infancy.

== Business ventures ==
Throughout his working life Laker was involved in a number of aviation-related business ventures. Even when he was working for others, his decisions had far-reaching strategic consequences for the business that employed him.

=== Early business ventures ===
Laker's early post-war business ventures (prior to 1960) included:

==== Aviation Traders ====
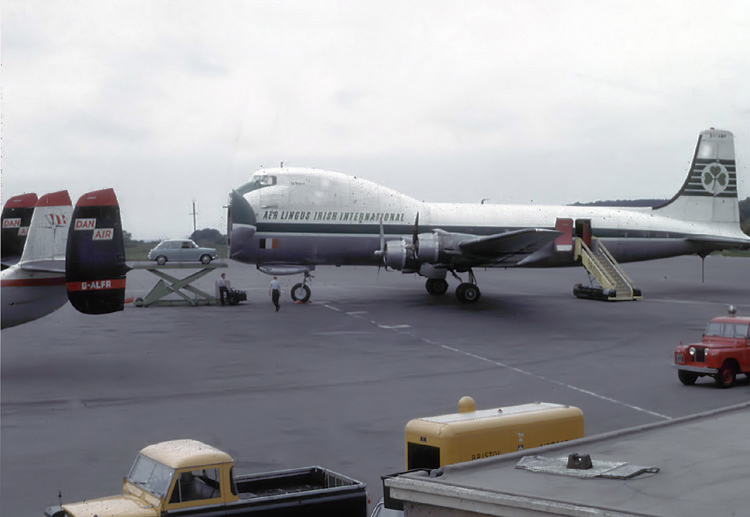
Aer Lingus Carvair loading a car at Bristol Airport, Bristol, England, in 1965

Freddie Laker founded Aviation Traders in October 1947. It was based at Southend Airport, Essex, England and specialised in converting numerous war-surplus bombers and transporters into freighters. This included the conversion of Handley Page Halifax bombers into freighters, six of which were sold to Bond Air Services, an early post-war British independent (Note: independent from government-owned corporations) airline. Bond Air Services based these planes at Wunstorf aerodrome in West Germany to carry essential supplies into West Berlin during the Berlin Blockade of 1948–49. Bond Air Services furthermore contracted Aviation Traders to service these planes. In return, Aviation Traders got half of Bond Air Services' freight charges.

Following the end of the Berlin Airlift in 1949, Laker had most of the Halifaxes he had supplied to various independent airlines during the Airlift scrapped at its Southend facilities. He also made use of these facilities for the subsequent conversion of several DC-4/C-54 Skymaster airframes into Carvairs for various operators around the world.

In addition, Aviation Traders re-engined Argonauts, BOAC's Canadian-built Canadair North Stars, with unused Rolls-Royce Merlin piston engines, which it sourced from the 88 spare Merlins Freddie Laker had acquired earlier along with BOAC's entire fleet of Haltons – former Royal Air Force Halifax bombers that had been converted to carry passengers and cargo – and several Avro Tudors purchased from the Government. It also produced an all-new aircraft design, the ATL-90 Accountant.

In 1951, Aviation Traders (Engineering), a sister company of Aviation Traders, won a contract from Bristol Aircraft to manufacture wing centre sections for Bristol Freighters. Between the beginning of 1952 and the end of 1955, Aviation Traders (Engineering) built 50 wing sections for Bristol Aircraft.

In 1958, Laker announced his decision to sell both Aviation Traders and Air Charter to Airwork for £600,000 cash plus a further £200,000, subject to the valuation of stock. The deal became effective in January 1959, when Aviation Traders and Air Charter joined the Airwork group.

==== Air Charter ====
This was his first airline venture, which he took over in 1951. Since its inception in 1947, Air Charter had been based at London's old Croydon Airport. The airline participated in the 1948–49 Berlin Airlift. (Following the end of the Airlift in 1949, Laker sold the Air Charter Yorks that were still airworthy to other independent airlines, two of which were acquired by Dan-Air in 1956).)

On 14 April 1955, Air Charter inaugurated its first vehicle ferry service between Southend and Calais using a Bristol 170 Mark 32 Super Freighter.

In 1958, Laker announced his decision to sell both Air Charter and Aviation Traders to Airwork for £600,000 cash plus a further £200,000, subject to the valuation of stock.

In January 1959, Air Charter became a subsidiary of the Airwork group.

Following a rationalisation of Air Charter's flight crew and ground staff in February 1959, Laker decided to transfer all vehicle ferry services along with the Bristol 170 fleet to the newly formed Channel Air Bridge.

Air Charter was absorbed into British United Airways in June 1960, as a result of Airwork's merger with Hunting-Clan and several other contemporary, British independent operators.

==== Channel Air Bridge ====
His second airline venture began flying cars and their owners across the English Channel in 1954, initially using a fleet of Bristol Freighter twin-engined, piston-powered planes. These were later supplemented and eventually superseded by the larger-capacity, four-engined Carvairs. The Carvair design was based on the Douglas DC-4 piston-engined airliner. It involved raising the aircraft's cockpit "above" the fuselage in a 747-style bulge so as to create more space for vehicles and/or passengers on the main deck. It also involved replacing the DC-4's original tail fin with a newly designed, larger DC-7-style fin as well as equipping the aircraft with a Bristol Freighter-type nose-loading cargo door, more powerful brakes and a stronger undercarriage.

At the end of 1958, he sold Channel Air Bridge together with his other two companies – Air Charter and Aviation Traders – to Airwork. All three officially became part of the Airwork group in January 1959. In June 1960 Airwork and Hunting-Clan merged to form British United Airways. Channel Air Bridge continued operating under its own identity for more than two years.

On 1 January 1963, Channel Air Bridge merged with Silver City Airways, which had pioneered commercial cross-Channel vehicle ferry flights in 1948. The merged entity traded as British United Air Ferries.

In the meantime, Laker had been appointed British United's managing director.

During his tenure (1960–65), British United became Britain's biggest wholly privately owned, independent airline. It also became the UK's first independent airline to re-equip its entire fleet with new jet aircraft.

In 1961, British United became the launch customer for the BAC One-Eleven short haul jetliner when it placed an order for ten series 200 aircraft. Laker had personally negotiated this deal with the manufacturer. This was the first time that an independent airline had placed an order for brand-new jets. The first of the new One-Elevens entered service on 9 April 1965, on the airline's scheduled London Gatwick—Genoa route. Laker also placed an order for Vickers VC10 series 1103 long-haul jets on behalf of British United. The first two aircraft were delivered towards the end of 1964. (These aircraft differed from other operators' VC10s by having a large cargo door on the left-hand side of the forward fuselage where the aircraft's first class section was located. They also had extended wingtips that were slightly bent downwards to reduce the aircraft's cruise drag as well as to help it overcome the instability encountered when entering a stall.)

By the end of that decade, British United had an all-jet fleet, which gave it a competitive edge over its contemporary independent rivals.

Laker was furthermore instrumental in securing the transfer of the traffic rights for BOAC's loss-making South American routes to Argentina, Brazil, Chile and Uruguay to British United. The airline commenced service on these routes in November 1964 using its brand-new VC10s and managed to make them profitable within five years.

In 1965, Laker decided to leave British United to set up his own airline following an alleged disagreement with British United's chairman Myles Wyatt.

=== Subsequent business ventures ===
Laker was involved in the following business ventures during the later postwar years of the 20th century (post-1960):

==== Laker Airways ====
Laker Airways was formed in 1966. This was Laker's third and most prominent airline venture. Laker Airways commenced commercial airline operations that July with a fleet of two ex-BOAC Bristol Britannias. These were subsequently supplemented and eventually replaced with a brand-new fleet of BAC One-Eleven jetliners as well as a pair of second-hand Boeing 707 jets.

Initially, Laker Airways was a charter airline and wholesale tour operator. British (as well as other European) airline regulations at the time required that charter-based low-price air travel be sold to the public only as a component of an air-hotel package. Other big British charter airlines were also owned by tour operators, mainly selling low-priced packages to Mediterranean beach destinations. For many years Laker had been the most profitable as well as the best-run charter airline in Britain.

Laker Airways pioneered many new, cost-saving as well as profit-enhancing, commercial concepts and operational techniques.

In 1969, Laker Airways announced its intention to buy the proposed BAC Three-Eleven, an all-British widebodied jet powered by two rear-mounted Rolls-Royce RB211 engines. The airline's letter of intent was for four aircraft to be delivered in 1974. It was anticipated that these 250-seaters would replace the entire narrow-bodied fleet, which was envisaged to comprise two 158-seat Boeing 707s and four 84-seat BAC One-Elevens by that time. Following the project's cancellation in 1971 due to a lack of Government funding, Laker remarked that this would force him to spend the £3 billion he had planned to invest by 1986 in a fleet of British-built widebodied airliners (including options) on competing foreign models.

Laker Airways eventually became the first independent British airline to actually operate widebodied equipment when it introduced its first two McDonnell Douglas DC-10-10 series aircraft into commercial airline service in November 1972, the first European operator to do so. These aircraft were the first UK-registered DC-10s.

In 1973, Laker Airways operated the world's first Advance Booking Charter (ABC) flight. By the mid-1970s it had become the undisputed, global ABC flight market leader.

Laker Airways scored another industry first when it introduced its first daily Skytrain low-fare scheduled service between London Gatwick and New York John F. Kennedy Airport on 26 September 1977.

==== Skytrain ====
On 15 June 1971, Laker Airways submitted an application to the UK's Air Transport Licensing Board (ATLB), one of the forerunners of today's Civil Aviation Authority (CAA), to launch the world's first daily transatlantic, low-fare scheduled service between London and New York City, charging an incredibly low one-way fare of £32.50 in winter and £37.50 in summer. This was one third of what the major, established "flag carriers" were charging at the time. The proposed service was to be marketed using the Skytrain trademark and was to be initially operated with 158-seat, single-class Boeing 707-138Bs that were acquired second-hand. Skytrain was to be a "walk-on", "walk-off" operation that did not require any advance reservations. Instead, seats were to be sold to the travelling public at each end of the route on a "first come, first served" basis only.

The ATLB rejected Laker's application before the year was out, and Laker appealed against the ruling. The appeal was successful, and the ATLB eventually granted Laker the requested licence in February 1972.

However, on 30 March 1972, the UK government revoked Laker's licence and instructed him to reapply to the CAA, which came into being on 1 April 1972.

Laker duly reapplied to the CAA for permission to operate eleven weekly Skytrain services each way between London Gatwick and New York's John F. Kennedy Airport (JFK) during the summer and seven weekly round-trips during the winter. The summer schedule was to be operated with Laker's brand-new DC-10 widebodied jet aircraft to take advantage of increased demand he anticipated for his new low-fare service during the peak months from June to September as well as of the DC-10's low break-even load factor of only 52%. The winter schedule was to be operated with 707 narrowbodies as specified in Laker's original application to the ATLB.

The newly formed CAA approved Laker's application on 5 October 1972, granting a ten-year licence. However, it specified Stansted rather than Gatwick as the service's UK departure/arrival point and limited the number of seats that could be sold in winter to 189 per trip, the maximum number of passengers a Boeing 707 could accommodate in a high-density, all-economy configuration. The unexpected change of the UK departure/arrival point for Laker's Skytrain service as well as its capacity limit during the lean winter season were intended not to undermine the planned launch of a daily British Caledonian (BCal) Gatwick—JFK full-service scheduled operation, for which the ATLB had already granted that airline a 15-year licence, along with another 15-year licence for a daily Gatwick—Los Angeles International Airport full-service scheduled operation, during the so-called "cannon ball" hearings earlier the same year.

The UK government designated Laker Airways as a scheduled transatlantic UK "flag" carrier on 11 January 1973.

However, under intense pressure from the established airlines, including Laker's archrival and next-door Gatwick neighbour BCal, against a backdrop of huge losses and overcapacity on the North Atlantic in the aftermath of the global energy crisis caused by the Organization of Petroleum Exporting Countries' oil embargo, the UK's Labour government of that era decided to revoke Laker's licence on 29 July 1975.

Freddie Laker took the government to the UK High Court, which overturned the latter's decision to revoke the airline's licence for a Skytrain service between London and New York.

It took another two years until Laker gained final approval, including a reciprocal permit from the relevant US authorities, which was granted for a one-year experimental period on 13 June 1977 by US President Jimmy Carter – to commence Skytrain.

In the meantime, Peter Shore, the then Secretary of State for Trade, had conducted a review of the government's aviation policy and in 1976 announced a new "spheres of influence" policy that ended dual designation for British airlines on all long-haul routes. As a result of this new aviation policy, BA and BCal were no longer permitted to run competing scheduled services on the same long-haul routes and the latter was forced to withdraw from the London—New York and London—Los Angeles routes, resulting in the suspension of BCal's Gatwick—JFK and Gatwick—Los Angeles licences. The same year, Edmund Dell, Peter Shore's successor, renounced the original Bermuda air services agreement of 1946 and initiated bilateral negotiations with his US counterparts on a new air services agreement, which resulted in the Bermuda II treaty of 1977.

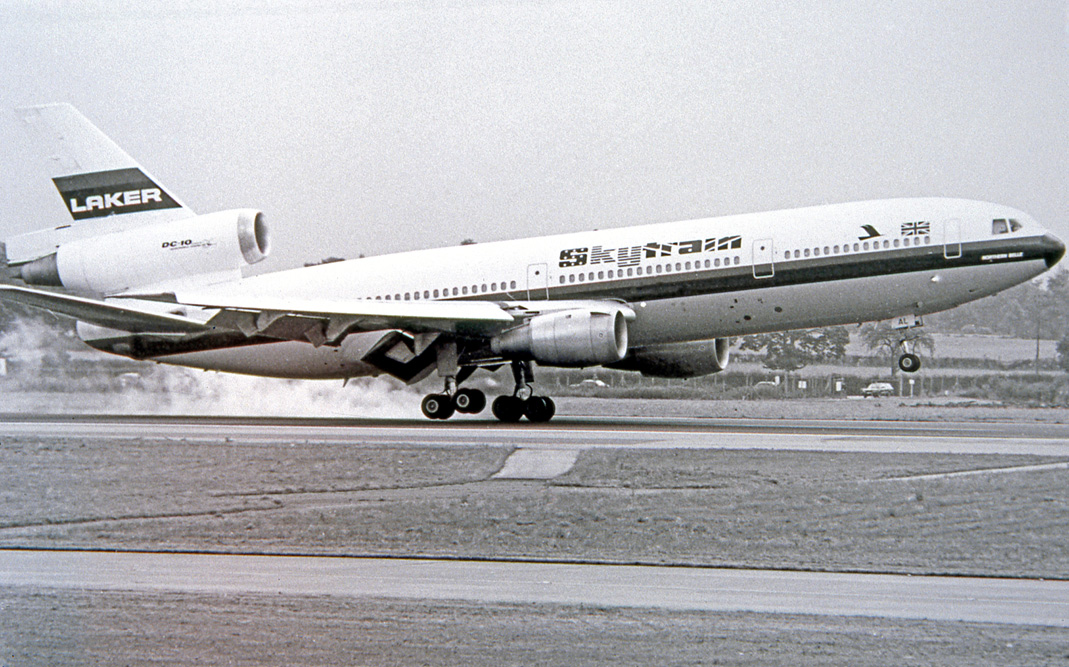
Skytrain titles on a Laker Airways Douglas DC-10 at Manchester Airport in 1979

Laker's long-running Skytrain application was finally granted in 1977 upon designating the airline as the second UK flag carrier between London and New York under the then just-concluded Bermuda II UK-US air agreement. At the last minute prior to the inaugural Skytrain flight from London to New York, Laker also received government permission to use its Gatwick base as the service's UK departure and arrival point, rather than Stansted as originally specified in its licence. The restriction limiting it to 189 seats per aircraft in winter was lifted as well and the baggage allowance was brought into line with International Air Transport Association (IATA) rules.

Skytrain took to the air for the first time on 26 September 1977 when the inaugural flight departed London Gatwick for New York JFK. This flight carried 272 passengers on one of the airline's 345-seat McDonnell Douglas DC-10 widebodied aircraft. The fares charged at the time were £59 (equivalent to £347 in 2025) one-way from London and $135 (equivalent to £793 in 2025) one-way from New York.

Skytrain was originally envisaged to achieve a 50% load factor in winter. By summer 1978, the actual load factor was 80%.

After unsuccessfully trying to block Laker through government regulation, the incumbent giant lines, British Airways, Pan Am and TWA, immediately matched Laker's standby fares and rules for at least a portion of their economy-class seats. Pan Am also introduced a new low-fare alternative, "budget," where a traveller could confirm a seat at the time of purchase, but only for travel within a three-day travel "window," with a specific flight and date confirmed by the airline a week before departure.

Laker claimed that Skytrain helped to grow passenger numbers for all airlines in the London—New York market, citing statistics comparing passenger numbers for the July—September peak season in 1977 with those of the corresponding period in 1976 as evidence. These had shown that in the days before Skytrain, total traffic between London and New York for the aforesaid period in 1977 was down 2% on the same period in 1976. He contrasted these figures with those comparing the October—December 1977 off-peak period with the corresponding 1976 off-peak period. The latter set of figures had shown a 30% increase, boosted by "Skytrain", which launched on 26 September 1977.

A closer analysis comparing the figures for October 1977 with those of the same month in 1976 had shown an increase of 31.8% (37,902 passengers) for all airlines. A further breakdown of these figures had shown that Laker's "Skytrain" accounted for 15% (17,501 passengers) of the overall increase while competing services of rival airlines accounted for the remaining 16.8% (20,401 passengers). The latter included IATA members British Airways, Pan Am, and TWA, which had initially opposed "Skytrain" but subsequently matched its low fares. (Note: in addition to BCal) (Statistics for November and December 1977, as well as for January—June 1978, had also shown that the overall monthly growth in the London—New York market was maintained at that level for the remainder of this period while Skytrain managed to grow its share of the overall monthly increase to 50% and keep up this performance until the end of the period.)

Skytrain became a financial success in its first year of operation, leading to further expansion over the coming years, in terms of new routes as well as additional frequencies.

As a result of his clever publicity stunts to market the then brand-new London—New York Skytrain service, Freddie Laker himself became popular with the public ("the forgotten man's hero") and was regarded as one of Margaret Thatcher's "golden boys" of industry (along with Sir Clive Sinclair and Sir Alan Sugar). The future Conservative Prime Minister was a self-confessed "Freddie Laker fan".

However, it was James Callaghan's "pro-union" Labour Government that awarded Laker his knighthood for services to the airline industry in 1978, rather than Margaret Thatcher's subsequent "pro-business" Conservative administration (although the latter had recommended him for his service to private enterprise in her capacity as the then leader of the opposition).

As Skytrain expanded to other British and U.S. gateways, the airline placed orders for additional McDonnell Douglas DC-10 widebodies, including the company's first order for five longer-range series-30 aircraft required for its Los Angeles flights. These were delivered from December 1979 onwards to support its growing number of destinations and frequencies.

The airline also became one of the early buyers of the first Airbus airliner, the A300, ordering ten of these widebodies in 1979 and had plans to deploy the aircraft on a new network of intra-European Skytrain routes.

Skytrain came to an end the day the airline went into receivership at the behest of the Midland Bank on 5 February 1982.

==== Collapse and the end of Skytrain ====
In 1982, the company went bankrupt, owing over £250 million (equivalent to £900 million in 2025). The airline made its last flight on 5 February 1982, the day it went into receivership.

There were numerous reasons for what was termed the biggest corporate failure in Britain at the time:

- Laker Airways had expanded too quickly in the late 1970s and early 1980s when it took delivery of a large fleet of brand-new DC-10 and A300 widebodies, which had been bought with US funds borrowed at too high a rate of interest. Subsequent devaluations of sterling meant increased costs in servicing the debt.
- The company was undercapitalised and did not enjoy the financial backup of any significant assets, which seriously undermined its ability to withstand a concerted and prolonged campaign to put it out of business at the depth of the 1981–82 recession at the hands of its financially stronger competitors.
- Laker Airways incurred a revenue loss estimated at £13 million when the worldwide DC-10 fleet was grounded as a result of having its certificate of airworthiness temporarily withdrawn in the aftermath of the American Airlines DC-10 crash at Chicago O'Hare in May 1979.
- Some passengers may also have perceived the DC-10 as unsafe as a result of a string of fatal accidents involving the aircraft within a short timespan during the late 1970s (including the aforementioned 1979 American Airlines crash at Chicago O'Hare, and the previous 1974 crash of a Turkish Airlines DC10 at Beauvais, near Paris).
- The implications of the strategic decision to build its business on discount travellers only.
- The conspiracy of large airlines throughout Europe and North America, which were aggressively price-matching Laker Airways even at the expense of massive losses. This charge, which was brought to court as the largest aviation antitrust case in history, was later settled out of court. Sir Freddie sued IATA member airlines British Airways, British Caledonian, Pan Am, TWA, Lufthansa, Air France, Swissair, KLM, SAS, Sabena, Alitalia and UTA for conspiracy to put his airline out of business by predatory pricing. They settled out of court for US$50 million, with British Airways later agreeing to contribute a further $35 million. British Airways also reached a separate out-of-court agreement with Sir Freddie personally for £8 million.
- Aggressive, non-profitable price dropping in Australia by Qantas, which later went on to enjoy a monopoly and pushed east/west airline prices through the roof.
- Fallout from the company's demise descended into litigation, which delayed the privatisation of British Airways.

=== Laker Airways Mark II ===
Laker was undaunted and almost immediately attempted to relaunch the airline with assistance from one of Britain's titans of industry, Tiny Rowland, the Managing Director of Lonrho, plc – one of the nation's largest conglomerates – and on the back of a strong public following (a relief fund gathered over £1 million, including a benefit concert in San Francisco by the music band The Police, who had used the airline to tour America in their formative years).

However despite Rowland’s offer of funding being described as “adequate” by Laker, the attempt was unsuccessful due to their failure to secure the necessary licensing.

Laker, by now living in the Bahamas, got off the ground again in the early 1990s, moving his refounded business's base to Freeport. Laker Airways flew from there until it shut down in 2005. It was Laker's final airline venture.

== Legacy ==
Laker was the 2002 recipient of the Tony Jannus Award for his distinguished contributions to commercial air transportation. He is remembered for his famous advice to fellow airline entrepreneurs Richard Branson, of Virgin Atlantic, and Stelios Haji-Ioannou, of easyJet, to "sue the bastards", a reference to the bullying tactics of British Airways in trying to force upstarts out of business (in relation to Stelios's wrongful accusations of anti-competitive behaviour on the part of BA's low-cost subsidiary, Go).

Virgin Atlantic had earlier named one of its Boeing 747s The Spirit of Sir Freddie. In addition, Malaysia's low-cost, long-haul carrier AirAsia X named its first Airbus A330 Semangat Sir Freddie in homage to the pioneer of "no-frills" air travel. The third plane to be named in spirit after Freddie Laker happens to be a Boeing 737 MAX that belongs to Norwegian Air Shuttle, delivered in May 2017. His name has also recently been applied to a Norwegian Air Sweden Boeing 787-9 Dreamliner, with the registration SE-RXZ.

He was also the subject of a musical, Laker!, as performed at Not in Front of the Audience in 1982, and written by Mel Smith and Peter Brewis in reaction to Laker Airways' bankruptcy.

In the 1984 comedy film Top Secret!, Laker was referenced in a climactic moment when the heroine Hillary realizes that her former lover Nigel is a traitor. Nigel gloats that in becoming a villain that he was exposed to great thinkers, "Like Karl Marx, Lenin, L. Ron Hubbard, Freddie Laker!"

In 1988, InsideFlyer magazine’s editor and publisher Randy Petersen created the Freddie Awards to honour Freddie Laker's accomplishments in marketing travel. The awards recognize excellence in frequent traveller awards programs. The Freddie Awards were touted as the frequent traveller's answer to the Oscar, Emmy and Grammy Awards by Petersen. The individual categories for the Freddie Awards are Best Award, Best Bonus, Best Affinity Credit Card, Best Newsletter/Member Communications, Best Web Site, Best Customer Service, Best Award Redemption, Best Elite Level and Program of the Year.

When the new passenger terminal at London Southend Airport was opened in 2012, the upstairs bar was named Laker's Bar, and featured a montage of Laker and his airline across the walls. In 2015, the bar was moved into the departure lounge and renamed Laker's Bar & Restaurant, and displays images of Laker and his company like its predecessor.

In June 2017, Norwegian Air International placed Laker's image on the tail of their first 737-8 MAX (EI-FYA). Laker is one of the company's five "British tail fin heroes", joining Queen frontman Freddie Mercury, children's author Roald Dahl, pioneering pilot Amy Johnson and England's World Cup winning captain Bobby Moore.

== Notes and citations ==
Notes

Citations
