= Laker =

Laker or Lakers may refer to:

== Sports teams ==
=== Professional ===
==== Basketball ====
- Los Angeles Lakers, originally the Minneapolis Lakers, a National Basketball Association (NBA) team from Los Angeles, California, United States
- Coachella Valley Lakers, originally the South Bay Lakers, a team in the NBA G League
- Hutt Valley Lakers, a former basketball team based in Wellington, New Zealand
- Laguna Lakers, a defunct basketball team based in Laguna, Philippines

==== Ice hockey ====
- Penticton Lakers, a Canadian ice hockey team
- Rapperswil-Jona Lakers, a Swiss ice hockey team
- Växjö Lakers, a Swedish ice hockey team in the Swedish Hockey League

==== Other sports ====
- Peterborough Lakers Jr. A, a box lacrosse team from Peterborough, Ontario, Canada
- Doncaster Lakers, a British rugby league club

=== Collegiate ===
- Clayton State Lakers, the NCAA Division II athletic program of Clayton State University in Morrow, Georgia
- Grand Valley State Lakers, the athletic program of Grand Valley State University, an NCAA Division II school in Allendale, Michigan
- Iowa Lakes Community College Lakers, located in Estherville, Iowa
- Lake Superior State Lakers, the athletic program of Lake Superior State University, an NCAA Division II school in Sault Ste. Marie, Michigan that fields an NCAA Division I men's ice hockey team
- Mercyhurst Lakers, the athletic program of Mercyhurst University, an NCAA Division I school in Erie, Pennsylvania
- Nipissing Lakers, competing in Ontario University Athletics, in North Bay, Ontario
- Roosevelt Lakers, the athletic program of Roosevelt University, an NCAA Division II school in Chicago, Illinois
- State University of New York at Oswego (Oswego State) Lakers, an NCAA Division III school, in Oswego, New York

=== High school ===
- Bonneville High School (Washington Terrace, Utah) Lakers
- Calloway County High School Lakers, Murray, Kentucky
- Camdenton R-III School District Lakers, Camdenton, Missouri
- Danbury High School Lakers, Marblehead, Ohio
- Detroit Lakes High School Lakers, Detroit Lakes, Minnesota
- Indian Lake High School Lakers, Lewistown, Ohio
- Mercyhurst Preparatory School Lakers, Erie, Pennsylvania
- Cazenovia High School Lakers, Cazenovia, New York
- Skaneateles High School Lakers, Skaneateles, New York
- West Bloomfield High School Lakers, West Bloomfield, Michigan
- Penticton Secondary School Lakers, Penticton, British Columbia

== Other uses ==
- Laker (surname)
- Lake freighter or laker, a type of cargo ship
- Laker Airways, an airline company
- Laker Beer, a brand of beer sold in Canada
