= JESS3 =

- Type: Private
- Industry: Web / Print / Multimedia
- Genre: Creative agency
- Founder: Jesse Thomas
- Headquarters: Los Angeles, California, United States
- Area served: United States; United Kingdom; France
- Key people: Jesse Thomas, Chief executive officer
- Services: data visualization social media strategy infographics branding web design
- Website: https://jess3.com

JESS3 is an interactive agency based in Los Angeles, CA, specializing in data visualization, social media strategy, infographics, branding and web design. The firm has worked with clients including Google, Nike, Intel, Facebook, ESPN, and Samsung.

== Background ==
JESS3 was founded in 2007 by web designer Jesse Thomas, its CEO. JESS3 is a creative interactive agency specializing in producing videos and graphics to explain complex information through "visual storytelling". The firm originally focused on design work, and later added services including social media strategy, research and development of interactive installations. The firm's eventual name was conceived by Thomas when he was a student, who replaced the "e" in his first name with the numeral "3", inspired by Eminem's logo. The firm's clients have included Nike, Intel, Microsoft, NASA, MySpace, Facebook, Google, Yahoo! and Samsung. From 2009, the company became Mashable's official design partner on projects, including their iPhone application.

As of 2011, the firm has 30 employees and offices in locations across the United States, in the United Kingdom and France. JESS3 is headquartered in Los Angeles, California, and has an additional office in Oklahoma City, while previously having established offices in Denver, Orlando, Portland, Oregon, and Washington D.C.

== 2013 Geeks on a Plane scandal ==
In 2013, CEO Jesse Thomas participated in the Geeks on a Plane program. While drunk on an Indian beach, Thomas took a video of his naked and drunk friend AlphaBoost CEO Matt Monahan. Thomas then uploaded the video to YouTube and posted it to JESS3's Twitter feed. As a result of the fallout of this incident, JESS3 lost most of its employees and clients.

== Projects ==
=== Data visualization ===
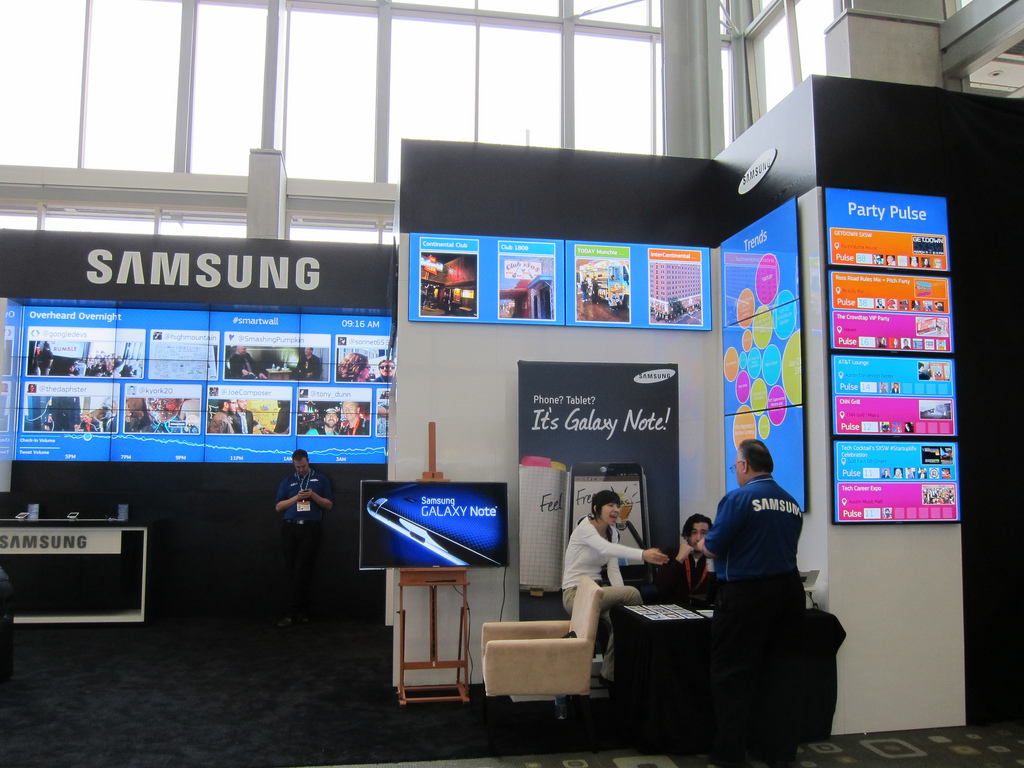
JESS3's "Smart Wall" data visualization installation for Samsung at SXSWi 2012

JESS3 has created and co-sponsored numerous visual design projects, particularly infographics and media installations. In October 2010, JESS3 created a visual representation of Foursquare check-ins at polling locations on voting day, in cooperation with the Voting Information Project, the Pew Trusts and Rock the Vote, providing a sample of foot traffic at each location. In August of that year, the company created the "GeoSocial Universe" infographic, comparing the sizes of the largest social networks including Skype, Facebook and Twitter to the total number of mobile device users, and the mobile user base for each social network. An updated version was released in May 2011 and was featured in TechCrunch.

At the International Consumer Electronics Show in January 2011, JESS3 created a social media installation for Intel providing a visualization of real-time social media interactions at the event. Later in 2011, the company created a media wall for Samsung at the SXSWi festival in Austin, Texas. The installation presented a visualization of social media activity at the festival, including photographs, tweets, popular topics and geosocial check-ins.

=== Video ===
JESS3 produces animated videos for clients including ESPN, for whom they created a short video explaining the Nielsen ratings system featuring hand puppets and papercraft. The company has produced videos for Google including a stop-motion video demonstrating Google's mobile Gmail system and an animation explaining how Google Translate works. JESS3 has produced videos including The State of Wikipedia, a video commemorating Wikipedia's tenth anniversary, narrated by Jimmy Wales, and The State of Cloud Computing, explaining the concept and history of cloud computing, sponsored by Salesforce.com. Similar projects have included a video produced for The Economist illustrating data collected in its Women's Economic Opportunity Index report.

The company also creates videos as independent projects, including a web video titled The State of the Internet, which it released in February 2010. The video included a series of infographics outlining the growth of Internet communications since the 1990s and had been viewed online over 1 million times within three months of its release.

=== Design and social media ===
The company has undertaken a wide range of social media and design projects, including websites for C-SPAN, the Discovery Channel and NASA, and collaborations with Facebook, Twitter, Gowalla and Foursquare. In August 2008, JESS3 designed a series of websites related to the 2008 presidential election for C-SPAN, for which they received a Webby Award nomination in 2009. In August 2012, C-SPAN announced that JESS3 had designed its "Campaign 2012" website, which provides video coverage and social content for the Democratic and Republican conventions. In addition to the election websites, JESS3 also developed the C-SPAN Video Library, which launched in March 2010, and provides access to the digitized C-SPAN video archives of over 160,000 hours of programming. The archives won an ACC Golden Beacon award on 16 September 2010 and a Peabody Award in March 2011.

In July 2010, JESS3 collaborated with Facebook on a project called Stories to help celebrate the social networking site reaching 500 million users. The application allows users to share stories about how Facebook has impacted their lives, sortable by geographical location or by topic.

JESS3 has served as social media adviser to NASA on multiple geosocial networking projects. In October 2010, JESS3 coordinated a joint project between NASA and Gowalla, creating NASA-related virtual items for the service's users to acquire, as well as a special NASA pin. The same month, JESS3 organized a partnership between NASA and Foursquare to engineer the first geosocial check-in from space. On 22 October 2010, International Space Station (ISS) commander Douglas H. Wheelock checked into Foursquare from the ISS and unlocked a new "NASA Explorer" badge. In addition, a customized NASA Foursquare homepage was launched providing information about locations of interest to the U.S. space program. Other projects JESS3 has developed for NASA include their "Buzzroom" website, which tracks NASA-related tweets, images and videos.

More recently, the company created a redesigned homepage for Samsung. In 2011, the firm designed Facebook pages for NIKEiD that allow users to create customized running shoe designs. In September 2011, Forbes announced that JESS3 had designed the artwork for a 60-page graphic novel titled The Zen of Steve Jobs, created with and to be published by Forbes magazine. The graphic novel depicts the period of Steve Jobs' life in the late 1980s following his exit from Apple and then his later return to the company.

== JESS3 Labs ==
In June 2010, JESS3 released the "Black Oil Plug-In" for Firefox, rendering any mention of BP, Transocean, the Gulf Oil Spill and related names and phrases into a dripping, black splotch within a user's browser. That same month, the company also introduced The Ex-Blocker, which enables users to prevent their web browser from showing their ex-lovers' activities and posts on various websites. The application received media coverage internationally, as well as in the U.S. including a mention on Late Night with Jimmy Fallon. As of October 2010 over 8,000 people had installed the Ex-Blocker plug-in.

The company has partnered with author Brian Solis on several JESS3 Labs infographic projects. A project titled The Conversation Prism elaborately diagrams types of communication across numerous Web 2.0 services. The first version of the infographic was released in August 2008, an updated version in March 2009 was featured in Communication Arts magazine and in October 2010, the company released a third edition. In 2009, JESS3 created a similar diagram called "The Twitterverse" with Solis, which outlines the network of applications built on Twitter's API. The company also worked with Solis on "The Social Media Brandsphere", a diagram illustrating how brands can use social media to engage with customers.
