= E-Lab =

American research and design firm

- Industry: Product design, product research, design
- Founded: Chicago, Illinois, U.S. (1994)
- Defunct: 1999 (acquired by Sapient Corp.)
- Headquarters: Chicago
- Area served: International
- Key people: John Cain, Rick Robinson, Mary Beth McCarthy
- Number of employees: ~50

E-Lab was a research and design consultancy established in Chicago, Illinois in 1994 by Rick Robinson, John Cain and Mary Beth McCarthy. The firm and its founders were part of a movement in the late 1980s when organizations such as Xerox/PARC (Palo Alto Research Center], IBM, Institute for Research on Learning and Jay Doblin & Associates embraced social science approaches in their product design and development efforts. E-Lab became known for pioneering a multidisciplinary, human-centric methodology strongly guided by anthropology and ethnography that was equally balanced between research and design. Its approach challenged conventional market research by prioritizing real-world user experiences and behaviors uncovered through fieldwork, helping to establish new practices termed "human-centered design," "design ethnography" and "design anthropology." In 1996, the business magazine Fast Company characterized E-Lab's approach as "simple but subversive" and "at the forefront of a growing movement to rethink how companies understand customers and create products that meet their needs."

In 1999, E-Lab was acquired by the technology consulting firm Sapient Corp. and became that company's "experience modeling" discipline, renamed "Xmod." In the 2000s, as former E-Lab/Xmod researchers and designers joined and formed other firms and organizations, its influence on the practice of anthropology and other social-science research in business spread. In 2009, anthropology researcher Melissa Cefkin wrote, "Robinson, Cain and their colleagues at the Doblin Group, E-Lab and Sapient contributed considerably to the development of current norms and forms of ethnographically oriented strategy and design consulting."

== History ==
E-Lab's founders met as co-workers at Doblin Group (initially Jay Doblin & Associates), a Chicago-based design consultancy. John Cain joined Doblin as a design strategist in 1987, and later became its design practice lead, after studying engineering and earning a BS in industrial design at the IIT Institute of Design. Rick Robinson completed a Ph.D. in human development at University of Chicago, studying with Mihaly Csikszentmihalyi; he was hired at Doblin in 1989 and became head of research. Mary Beth McCarthy joined the firm as a comptroller in 1991.

Their work at Doblin was cross-disciplinary, integrating ethnographic research, design and strategy, as did contemporary firms such as Fitch and IDEO. A breakthrough collaboration was the "Workplace Project" (1989) with Steelcase and Xerox/PARC, in which they worked with researchers including anthropologist Lucy Suchman, human-computer scientist Austin Henderson and linguists Charles and Marjorie H. Goodwin. Anthropology researchers Patricia L. Sunderland and Rita M Denny credited that project with catalyzing the growth and visibility of applied anthropology in design, consumer research and business discourse in the U.S. Anthropologist Marietta L. Baba wrote that the interdisciplinary project "would revolutionize the design industry" by conceptualizing the idea notion that new product and service concepts should emerge from "a contextually-rich understanding of the client’s natural world, developed through ethnographic field research at client sites," a concept that E-Lab would later take to the market.

In 1994, Cain, McCarthy and Robinson left Doblin to start a new type of consultancy more purely devoted to the integration of research and design and to ethnographic methodologies rather than strategy. They named it "E-Lab"—the "e" representing everyday experience and ethnography and "lab" positioning the firm as a product research laboratory for understanding and innovation. E-Lab's approach to disciplinary boundaries and hierarchy was egalitarian and fluid, equally balancing design professionals and young social-science researchers across many fields recruited through university graduate programs.

After securing initial projects from former Doblin clients Hallmark, McDonald's, Steelcase and Thomson Consumer Electronics (RCA), E-Lab attracted other projects from well-known technology and consumer product firms, automobile manufacturers, fast food restaurants and convenience store chains over five years, increasing its staff to nearly fifty employees. It also gained wider recognition through features in trade publications and the business magazines Fast Company, Business Week and Financial Times, speaking and writing engagements, and commentary in national features on the design of corporate workspaces, headquarters and identity.

After E-Lab was acquired by Sapient (then an internet systems company moving into design, communications and branding) in fall of 1999, it evolved into that firm's "experience modeling" discipline, "Xmod", and expanded into online brands. The acquisition more than doubled E-Lab's staff to fill offices in London, New York, San Francisco, Atlanta, and Sydney, with Robinson heading the new discipline as one of the first "chief experience officers."

In the 2000s, E-Lab's methodologies and philosophy continued to be an integral part of Sapient and other organizations through the spread of its multidisciplinary researchers. After leaving Sapient, Cain and Robinson again collaborated in 2010, on the founding of Iota Partners, a firm focused on instrumentation-driven consumer research, data and analytics; it too was acquired by Sapient (then SapientNitro), in 2012.

== Philosophy, methodologies and tools ==
According to anthropologist Christina Wasson, E-Lab's principle of an equal partnership between research and design represented a then-novel shift from the traditional representation of design as "an autonomous, inward-looking relationship between designer and product" that positioned research as secondary. The firm was strongly guided by a commitment to ethnography as a creative means of discovering cultural patterns and models and to a collaborative process throughout project development and execution that gave ethnographers a significant voice. Its multidisciplinary methodology was framed by anthropology but also drew upon sociology, human development, literary narrative, cultural theory and art history.

E-Lab's process was inductive; it involved gathering data on naturally occurring consumer behaviors through field observation (in person or by camera) and various self-reporting tools, analyzing it for patterns, and only then developing hypotheses. Going beyond basic qualitative research, the firm employed an analytic process that organized data through frameworks—explanatory concepts that identify key components of an experience and draw out underlying beliefs, attitudes and structural relationships on individual, social and cultural levels. Frameworks were developed into "experience models": simple but memorable narratives that can pinpoint gaps in an event and facilitate the generation of opportunities for design solutions and strategic action. These concepts flew in the face of both conventional product development—which often took a producer-centric direction fixated on features at the expense of user issues—and quantitative market research based on focus groups and attitude surveys, which measured what people say but missed unarticulated, unconscious meanings. Fast Company wrote that E-Lab's approach suggested "the secret to breakthrough innovation is understanding how people behave: what they do and how they live."

Many of E-Lab's methods became commonplace in what came to be known as design ethnography. Its tools, among others, included: field observation, "shadowing" (field observation with questions); and "intercept interviews"; "guerrilla video" of consumer behavior in stores and in public; proprietary software and telestrators used to index and diagram video images frame-by-frame; beepers and disposable cameras subjects used to document and self-report based on the longitudinal experience sampling method (ESM) developed by Mihaly Csikszentmihalyi, Reed Larson and Suzanne Prescott;. and dedicated project rooms with floor-to-ceiling trackable surfaces and whiteboards to track ongoing project narratives.

== Clients and projects ==
E-Lab's clients included technology product firms such as Apple, Claris, Netscape, Nokia, Texas Instruments and Thomson, consumer product companies like BP, Frito-Lay/PepsiCo, Hallmark, JanSport, Schick, Steelcase and Warner-Lambert, automakers (BMW, Ford, General Motors), and fast food (McDonald's) and convenience store chains.

Its work ranged widely, including among other projects, ethnographic fieldwork on customer behavior and store layout (for card stores, gas stations and snack food display) and workspace design; the shadowing of law enforcement officers to investigate mobility, connectivity and communications needs for new communication devices; and studies of teen mood swings and interactions with music, home audio equipment set-ups and usage, how people get sick and recover, the backpacks of middle-schoolers, personal and familial associations connected to cookware, and family message and schedule locations, among other subjects.

== Legacy ==
E-Lab's influence on design ethnography and product development practices extend through its early inception, operation within Sapient, diaspora across numerous organizations, and the written record of academic and trade papers and presentations by its partners and employees. Cain and Robinson published articles in journals such as Design Management Review, American Center for Design Journal, and Innovation, among others; Robinson presented at the Doors of Perception 6 conference (2000) and gave the keynote presentation at the inaugural EPIC (Ethnographic Praxis in Industry Conference) in 2005.

Former employees that have taken significant roles in other organizations and produced research in the field include: Luis Arnal (Insitum, Fjord), Maria Bezaitis (Intel), Jeanette Blomberg (IBM), Mark Burrell (IBM), Melissa Cefkin (Nissan), Martha Cotton (Fjord), Jodi Forlizzi (Carnegie Mellon University), Kelly L. Franznick (Blink), Rachel Jones (Microsoft, Hitachi, Instrata), Johanna Schoss (Biogen), Dori Tunstall (Design for Democracy), and Christina Wasson, among others.
