= Guide (software company) =

- Industry: Software
- Founded: Miami, Florida (2012)
- Founder: Freddie A. Laker
- Headquarters: Miami, United States
- Key people: Freddie A. Laker, CEO; Leslie Bradshaw, COO
- Website: gui.de

Guide was a US technology startup company developing a newsreader app that translates text from online news sources, blogs and social media streams into streaming audio and video. The company's apps include animal character readers. The company was founded in 2012 by chief executive officer Freddie A. Laker, and privately launched its mobile app in alpha in February 2013.

The company closed in 2014.

== Guide app ==
Guide is a visual newsreader app for personal computers, mobile devices and Smart TV, which uses text-to-speech and avatar technologies to turn text-based online news, blogs and social media updates into video content. These technologies allow Guide to turn articles into news program-style episodes, incorporating video or images from the original source, while the text content of the article or blog post is read aloud by a virtual news anchor. The app creates a "channel" for each site or news source, within which individual blog posts or news articles are separate episodes.

Guide allows users to choose from three different virtual news anchors in the base application, and the company has stated it will offer additional avatars and newsroom backgrounds for purchase. An alpha version of the app, for iPad only, was privately released on February 8, 2013.

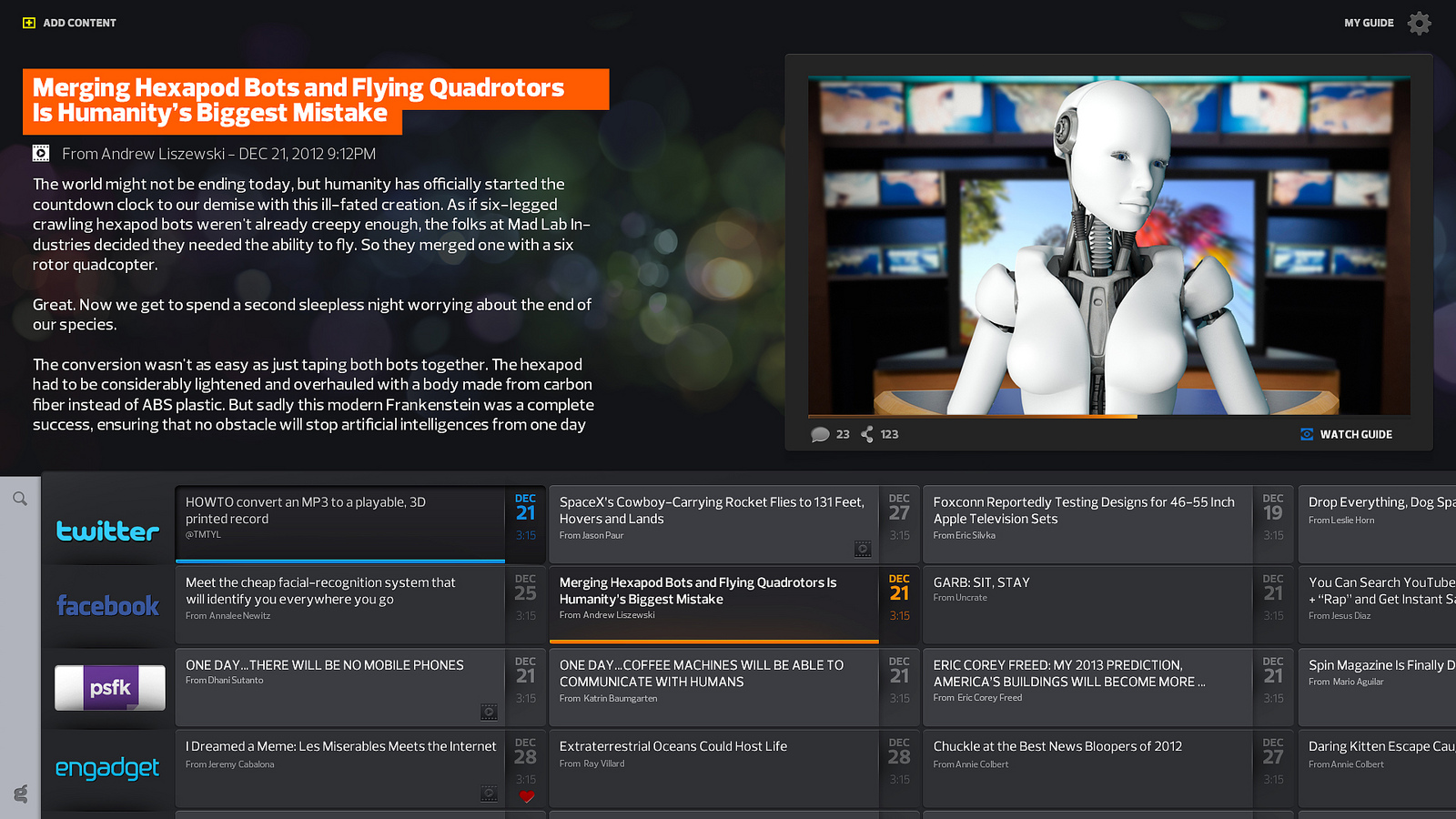
Screenshot showing the Guide app's user interface

== Background ==
Freddie Laker, former vice president of strategy at Sapient Nitro and founder of digital agency iChameleon Group, developed the idea for Guide in 2011 after he noticed the rising trend in Smart TVs and Smart TV content at that year's CES. He observed that the apps for Smart TV did not provide content in a TV-friendly format and decided to create an app that would provide a "TV experience". In January 2013, Laker was joined at the company by chief operating officer Leslie Bradshaw. The company is based in Miami, Florida, and has seven employees as of February 2013.

Guide closed its seed funding round in February 2013. It raised $1 million from investors including Sapient, the Knight Foundation, MTV founder Bob Pittman, founding Google team member Steve Schimmel, and actor Omar Epps. The company stated that the seed money will be used to focus on further development of the Guide app and pursuing patents for its technology. In February 2013, Guide was one of 65 companies out of 500 applicants selected to demonstrate its app in the annual South by Southwest (SXSW) Accelerator in Austin.
