= John Lake =

John Lake may refer to:

- John Lake (bishop) (1624–1689), bishop in the British Isles
- John Henry Lake (1877–?), American cyclist who won a bronze medal at the 1900 Summer Olympics
- John Lake (journalist) (born 1930), former sports editor of Newsweek who disappeared in 1967
- John E. Lake (1845–1920), businessman and politician in Newfoundland
- John G. Lake (1870–1935), Canadian-American businessman, missionary, and faith healer
- John Neilson Lake (1834–1925), founding father of Saskatoon
- John Lake (MP) for Exeter
