= La comunidad (agency) =

The Community
- Industry: Advertising, Branding, Marketing
- Founded: 2001
- Headquarters: Miami, Buenos Aires, London and New York City
- Area served: Worldwide
- Key people: Founders: Jose Molla; Joaquin Molla
- Parent: Publicis Sapient
- Divisions: The Community; The Maker's Lab
- Website: thecommunityagency.com

The Community (stylized as the community and also known as La Comunidad) is a global advertising agency with offices in Miami, Buenos Aires, London, San Francisco and New York City.

== History ==
It was founded in March 2001, simultaneously in both the USA and Argentina by Jose and Joaquin Molla. Jose Molla was Creative Director for Nike International at Wieden+Kennedy, while Joaquin was the Creative Director of Ratto/BBDO in Argentina. The company was founded on the idea that every brand has its community with whom it connects through universal truths which transcend nations and ethnicities.

== Acquisition ==
In January 2014, The Community was acquired by SapientNitro, which itself became Publicis Sapient in 2015. The following month, Joaquín and José Mollá published a satiric video called "Why we sold", explaining in their own words the reasons they decided to join SapientNitro, while enjoying different fancy and extravagant luxuries that they could now afford.
