= Freddie A. Laker =

British-American entrepreneur

- Born: Freddie Allen Laker
- Occupations: Founder and CEO of Chameleon Collective

Freddie Allen Laker is a British-American entrepreneur and the founder of the hybrid consulting and marketing services firm Chameleon Collective. Laker has also launched the Internet service provider Laker.net and the digital agency iChameleon Group, and worked at SapientNitro as the company's vice president of global marketing strategy. He is the son of Freddie Laker, the founder of British airline Laker Airways.

== Early career ==
Freddie Laker began his career after dropping out of college and joining his father's company, Laker Airways. The same year, he became a DJ for The Womb, a Miami-based pirate radio station. After being shut down by the Federal Communications Commission (FCC), the radio station used the Internet to transfer the signal between two antennas, making it the world's first 24-hour Internet radio station. Laker has credited the media attention surrounding this event with launching his career.

Following his time at The Womb, Laker founded Laker.Net, an Internet service provider (ISP) and web design company, which was the fifth ISP in the state of Florida. After seven years, he sold Laker.Net to another ISP, WebUnited (acquired by Host.net), where he worked for a short period as the director of sales before leaving to found iChameleon Group.

Laker's company iChameleon Group was a digital agency with clients including Coca-Cola, Guinness, Taco Bell and Toyota, for whom Laker developed digital marketing campaigns. In 2008, iChameleon Group was acquired by SapientNitro.

Following the acquisition, Laker worked on marketing and strategy for digital campaigns for SapientNitro. He worked out of SapientNitro's Miami office as the director of digital strategy, then moved to Shanghai as the company's executive director of digital strategy for Asia. He later returned to Miami, where he became the company's vice president of global marketing strategy. In 2012, after four years with the company, Laker left to launch Guide.

== Guide ==
In 2012, Laker founded the software company Guide. He was the company's chief executive officer. The company has developed a visual newsreader app that uses text-to-speech and avatar technologies to convert written news and blog sources into video. The idea behind the company came to Laker after attending a Consumer Electronics Show in 2011. Unimpressed by the user experience of current Smart TVs, he was motivated to develop an app that provided a TV experience.

In March 2013, Laker attended South by Southwest (SXSW), where Guide was selected as a finalist in the 2013 Accelerator competition. The next month, Laker was selected to present at The Next Web Conference Europe in Amsterdam, where Guide won the second round of the Microsoft BizSpark Startup Rally competition.

== Chameleon Collective ==
In 2015, Laker founded the consulting and executive recruiting firm Chameleon Collective. The company specializes in providing interim executive leadership to Private Equity backed businesses.

== Other roles ==
Laker is a contributor to the online publication PSFK and is also a co-founder of the Society of Digital Agencies, which promotes thought leadership and industry change among digital marketing agencies.

== Personal life ==
Laker is the son of the late Freddie Laker, the founder of Laker Airways, a budget airline company.
