= J. Stuart Moore =

American businessman

J. Stuart Moore is the co-founder and a member of the board of directors of Sapient, headquartered in Boston, Massachusetts. He was co-chairman and co-CEO until June 1, 2006.

Moore has a degree in computer science from the University of California, Berkeley.
