= Laker Airways (The Bahamas) =

1992–2005 US-registered private airline

Laker Bahamas / Laker Inc
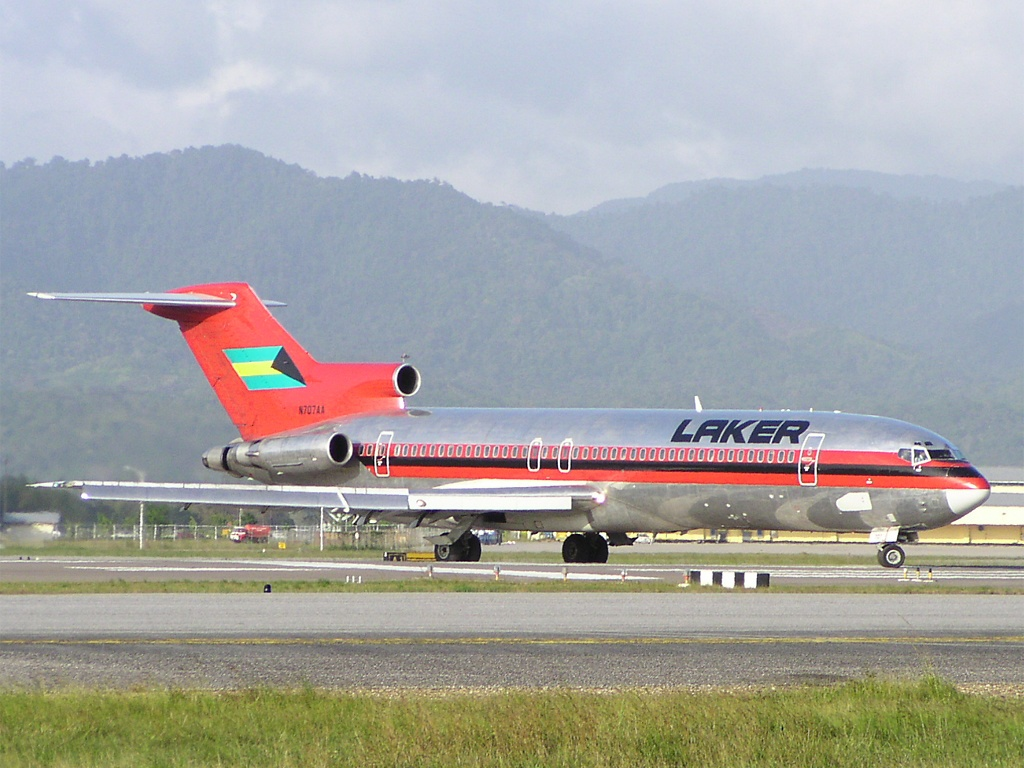
- A Laker Airways Boeing 727
IATA	ICAO	Call sign
1. 6F; (Laker Inc); 2. 7Z (Laker Bahamas)	1. –; 2. LBH; (Laker Bahamas)	1. –; 2. LBH; (Laker Bahamas)
- Founded: 1992 (Laker Bahamas); 1996 (Laker Inc)
- Ceased operations: 2005
- Hubs: Freeport, Bahamas, Fort Lauderdale – Hollywood International Airport
- Fleet size: 8 (Laker Bahamas); 2 (Laker Inc)
- Destinations: London GatwicK; Manchester; Glasgow; Miami; Cincinnnati; Raleigh; Richmond; Nashville; Palm Beach
- Headquarters: The Bahamas
- Key people: Freddie Laker; Oscar Wyatt
- Website: www.lakerairways.com

Laker Airways (Bahamas) was an airline founded in 1992, which operated until 2005.

== History ==
Laker Airways (Bahamas) was a United States-registered airline based in the Bahamas to which Freddie Laker lent his name and operational expertise. The airline was established in 1992 with financial assistance from Oscar Wyatt, a Texas oilman and business partner of Laker. The initial fleet comprised two Boeing 727-200 Advanced narrow-bodied jet aircraft. Laker Airways (Bahamas) stopped operating in 2005 when the firm was wound up.

=== Laker Airways "Mark II" ===
In 1996, Freddie Laker and his business partner Oscar Wyatt, a self-made Texas oilman, established Laker Airways, Inc. as a sister airline to Laker Airways (Bahamas) to follow in the original, United Kingdom based Laker Airways footsteps. Laker Airways "Mark II" leased two McDonnell Douglas DC-10 widebodied jets to operate low-fare, high quality transatlantic scheduled services, which commenced on July 5, 1996, between Fort Lauderdale in Florida and London Gatwick at a frequency of two return flights per week. Additional scheduled services subsequently linked Orlando with Manchester and Glasgow Prestwick. Laker Airways, Inc. ceased operations in 1998.

== Destinations in 1994 and 1995 ==
According to the September 15, 1994, edition of the Official Airline Guide (OAG), Laker Airway (Bahamas) was operating nonstop Boeing 727-200 jet service between its main base in Freeport, Bahamas (FPO) and the following U.S. destinations:

- Baltimore, Maryland (BWI)
- Birmingham, Alabama (BHM)
- Chicago, Illinois – O'Hare International Airport (ORD)
- Fort Lauderdale, Florida (FLL)
- Greenville/Spartanburg, South Carolina (GSP)
- Memphis, Tennessee (MEM)
- Raleigh/Durham, North Carolina (RDU)
- Richmond, Virginia (RIC)
- West Palm Beach, Florida (PBI)

The April 2, 1995, OAG edition listed nonstop Laker 727 service between Freeport and the same U.S. cities above with the exception of Birmingham, Greenville and Memphis which were no longer served by the airline by this time with the following new destinations being served by Laker nonstop from Freeport as well:

- Cleveland, Ohio (CLE)
- Hartford, Connecticut/Springfield, Massachusetts – Bradley International Airport (BDL)

According to other OAG flight listings, additional U.S. cities were served at various times as well during the airline's existence.

== Fleet ==
Laker Airways operated a total of 10 Boeing 727s and four McDonnell Douglas DC-10s.
