= Carla Koppell =

American academic (born 1966)

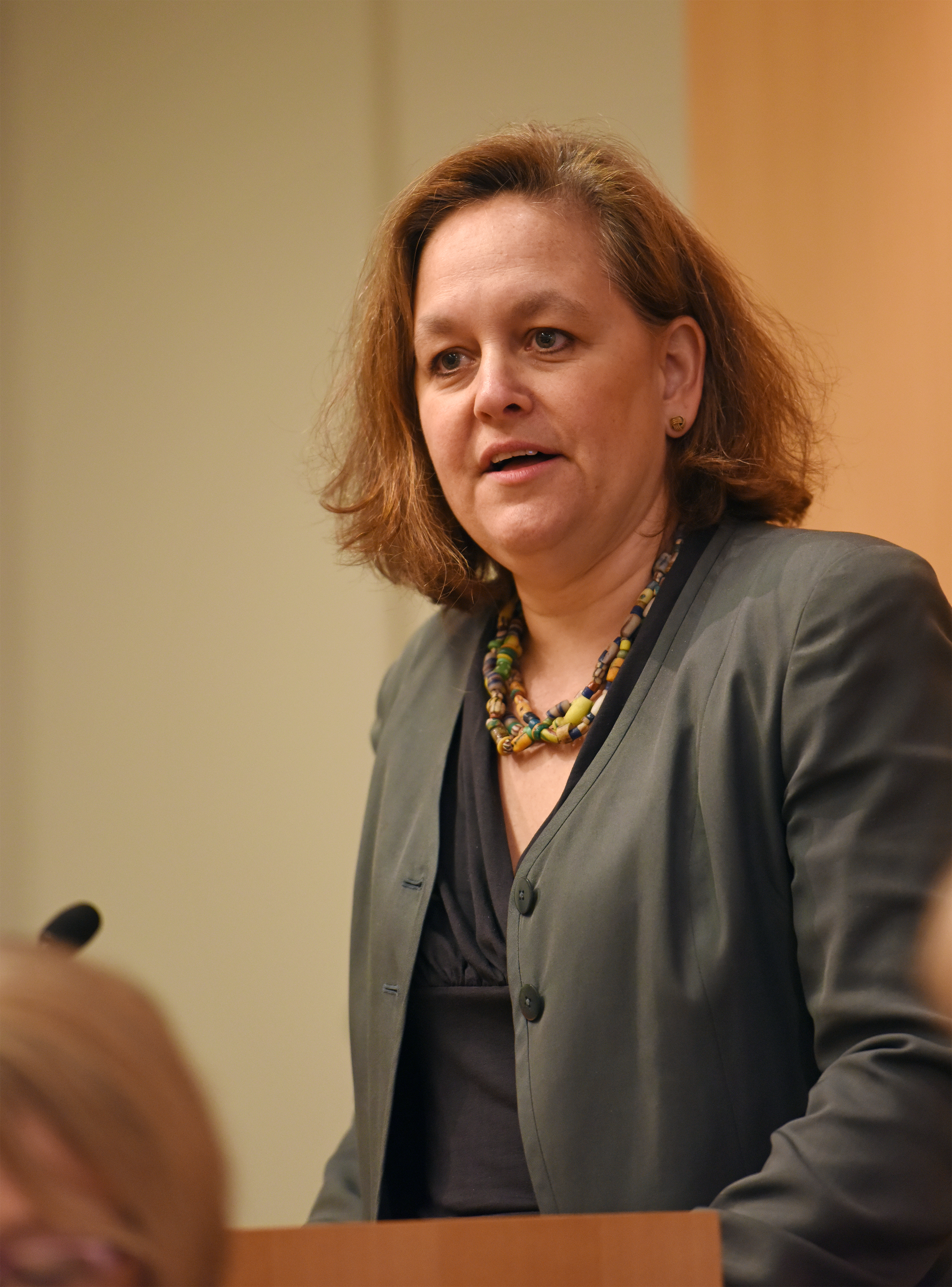
- Born: Carla Ravi Koppell; New York City, New York, U.S.
- Education: Cornell University (BA); Harvard University (MPP)
- Father: Oliver Koppell

Carla Ravi Koppell is an American academic who serves as Vice Dean for Diversity, Equity, and Inclusion at the Edmund A. Walsh School of Foreign Service at Georgetown University. As part of her work she collaborates with the Volcker Alliance to spearhead the University Leadership Council on Diversity and Inclusion in International Affairs. In that role, she works with deans of graduate schools of public policy and international affairs to incorporate attention to diversity and inclusion in their curricula and programs.

Koppell also serves as managing director of the Georgetown Institute for Women Peace and Security alongside Executive Director Melanne Verveer and Chairperson Hillary Clinton. In July 2020, she was reported to be leading a policy working group on international women's and girls' issues for the Joe Biden 2020 presidential campaign.

Koppell served as a vice president with the United States Institute of Peace. During the Obama administration, she served as Chief Strategy Officer and Senior Coordinator for Gender Equality and Women's Empowerment at the United States Agency for International Development. During the Clinton Administration, Koppell served as Deputy Assistant Secretary for International Affairs with the United States Department of Housing and Urban Development.

== Early life and education ==
Koppell was born and raised in New York City. She is the daughter of former New York Attorney General Oliver Koppell and Professor Kathleen Sunshine. She has two younger siblings, Jonathan Koppell and Jacqueline Koppell.

She obtained a bachelor's degree in communications at Cornell University in 1988. In 1992, she received a master's degree in public policy from the Harvard Kennedy School.

== Career ==
Koppell has worked internationally across the public, private and non-governmental sectors. Currently, Koppell works at the Walsh School of Foreign Service at Georgetown University as Vice Dean for diversity, equity and inclusion. She also serves as Managing Director of the Georgetown University Institute for Women, Peace and Security. She heads the Institute's University Leadership Council on Diversity and Inclusion in International Affairs. This body, composed of academic administrators spanning the U.S., aims to mainstream diversity and inclusion issues in academic curricula related to international affairs and public policy. Koppell has said that incorporating issues of diversity and inclusion in educational curricula is important for achieving the United Nations' Sustainable Development Goal 16, which focuses on establishing "peace, justice, and strong institutions."

Koppell has commented in interviews that emphasizing diversity and inclusion issues in international development efforts is both morally correct and conducive to stability and development. She has suggested, for instance, that the Oslo Accords would have been more supportive of community integrity had women been involved in negotiations. In 2020, she and Melanne Verveer criticized a deal struck between the U.S. Government and the Taliban regarding American troop withdrawal from Afghanistan, on the grounds that negotiations had not been inclusive of women. Koppell has edited a book on diversity, equity, and inclusion in international affairs called Untapped Power: Leveraging Diversity and Inclusion for Conflict and Development, which was published by Oxford University Press in February 2022.

Before taking a position with Georgetown University, Koppell was vice president of the Center for Applied Conflict Transformation for the United States Institute of Peace (USIP). Urging greater women's inclusion in international conflict resolution, she noted that post-conflict regions are significantly more likely to remain peaceful when women are involved in conflict resolution processes.

Before joining USIP, Koppell was chief strategy officer for the United States Agency for International Development (USAID) and USAID’s first senior coordinator for gender equality and women’s empowerment. In the latter role, she pushed to have attention to gender issues integrated into all aspects of USAID's and international development organizations' programming. Crucial, she explained, would be "enabling...technical specialists in every area to be able to think about those [women's] issues on their own." At the time, she highlighted education as a "silver bullet" for women and girls' empowerment. Koppell, as Senior Coordinator for Gender Equality and Women's Empowerment, was recognized as a key implementer of the Hillary Doctrine.

In the years prior to her time at USAID, Koppell directed the Institute for Inclusive Security and the Washington, D.C. office of Ambassador Swanee Hunt's Hunt Alternatives Fund. She also worked as interim director and, subsequently, senior advisor, at the Conflict Prevention Project of the Woodrow Wilson International Center for Scholars. At the Wilson Center, she published a book on often-overlooked global trends with negative implications for international security. During the Clinton Administration, Koppell was deputy assistant secretary of international affairs for the U.S. Department of Housing and Urban Development. She also held a role at the Food and Agriculture Organization.

Koppell serves on the boards of the Society for International Development, Norwegian Refugee Council, and Equal Access International.

On August 25, 2021, the White House announced her as the Biden administration's nominee for assistant administrator for development, democracy, and innovation at the United States Agency for International Development. On September 21, 2021, the nomination was sent to the United States Senate for confirmation. Koppell's nomination garnered coverage across in political media outlets and trade publications. Her nomination was officially withdrawn on April 7, 2022.

== Untapped Power: Leveraging Diversity and Inclusion for Conflict and Development ==
Koppell's edited volume, Untapped Power: Leveraging Diversity and Inclusion for Conflict and Development, was published by Oxford University Press in February 2022. The volume brings together 40 leaders, practitioners, and academics in the field of international relations from 6 continents and over 20 countries to discuss how diversity and inclusion are actually essential to ending global conflict and promoting social and economic well-being worldwide. The volume covers major movements for inclusion, including the movements for gender equality and women's empowerment, youth, peace and security, LGBTQ+ rights, disability inclusion, indigenous people's rights, and the rights of ethnic, religious, and linguistic minority communities. Untapped Power discusses the importance of the inclusion of these diverse and marginalized communities in peace mediation and negotiation processes, security sector forces, transitional justice, development, justice systems, and civil society, among other areas.

Contributors to the volume include:

- Leymah Gbowee, Nobel Laureate
- Atifete Jahjaga, Former President of Kosovo
- Wazhma Frogh, Afghan women's rights activist
- Valmaine Toki, Professor of law and expert member on the United Nations Permanent Forum on Indigenous Issues
- Lakshitha Saji Prelis, Director of Child and Youth Programs at Search for Common Ground
- Joshua Castellino, Executive Director at Minority Rights Group International
- Katia Papagianni, Director of Mediation Support and Policy at Centre for Humanitarian Dialogue
- Charlie Damon, Pacific Regional Program Manager at CARE Australia
- Sayed Ikram Afzali, Executive Director at Integrity Watch Afghanistan
