= Georgetown Institute for Women, Peace and Security =

US research institute

The Georgetown Institute for Women, Peace and Security (GIWPS) is an academic research institute housed in the Edmund A. Walsh School of Foreign Service at Georgetown University in Washington, D.C. It conducts research and policy analysis on the role of women in peace and security, and publishes the biennial Women, Peace and Security Index with the Peace Research Institute Oslo.

The institute was announced in December 2011 by Georgetown University president John J. DeGioia and U.S. Secretary of State Hillary Clinton, and was organized by Carol Lancaster, then dean of the School of Foreign Service. It began operations in February 2013 under founding executive director Melanne Verveer, the first United States Ambassador-at-Large for Global Women's Issues. Clinton serves as the institute's honorary founding chair.

== History ==
GIWPS was announced on 19 December 2011, when Clinton unveiled the first U.S. National Action Plan on Women, Peace and Security at Georgetown University; President Barack Obama signed the executive order implementing the plan the same day. The institute was organized by Carol Lancaster, then dean of the Edmund A. Walsh School of Foreign Service, where it is housed. Its remit draws on United Nations Security Council Resolution 1325 (2000), which affirmed the role of women in peacebuilding and security decision-making.

The institute formally launched on 20 February 2013. Melanne Verveer, who had served as the first United States Ambassador-at-Large for Global Women's Issues and was a former chief of staff to Clinton, became its founding executive director.

== Publications ==
=== Women, Peace and Security Index ===
The institute's flagship publication is the Women, Peace and Security Index, produced biennially with the Peace Research Institute Oslo (PRIO). The index scores and ranks countries on measures of women's inclusion, justice and security. The first edition was launched in October 2017 at a side event to the United Nations Security Council open debate on women, peace and security and covered 153 countries; coverage expanded in subsequent editions to 167 (2019/20), 170 (2021/22), 177 (2023/24) and 181 in the 2025/26 edition.

The 2025/26 edition ranked Denmark first and Afghanistan last of 181 countries, and reported that approximately 676 million women were living in conflict-affected settings in 2024, an increase of 74 percent since 2010.

=== Conflict Tracker ===
GIWPS publishes the Women, Peace and Security Conflict Tracker, an online resource created in 2024 that monitors armed conflicts in 25 countries with a focus on their effects on women, drawing on more than 80 qualitative and quantitative data points and updated monthly. The tracker informs an annual forecasting report, Women, Peace and Security: Conflicts and Trends to Watch.

GIWPS also publishes research reports, policy briefs and toolkits on topics including armed conflict, economic empowerment, climate and gender-based violence.

== Research and policy areas ==
GIWPS organizes its policy work around several stated priorities: countries in crisis, climate security, conflict-related sexual violence, and networks of women peacebuilders.

Its country-specific work focuses on states experiencing armed conflict or political crisis. The institute designates Ukraine, Afghanistan, Myanmar and Sudan as priority countries, alongside a regional initiative covering the Middle East and North Africa. In these settings it works with local women peacebuilders to analyze conflict dynamics and develop policy recommendations.

== Hillary Rodham Clinton Awards ==
In 2014, GIWPS established the Hillary Rodham Clinton Awards for Advancing Women in Peace and Security, presented at Georgetown to individuals recognized for contributions to women's roles in peacemaking and security. The inaugural awards went to British Foreign Secretary William Hague, Congolese physician Denis Mukwege and NATO Secretary General Anders Fogh Rasmussen. Filipina diplomat Miriam Coronel-Ferrer, the first woman to sign a major peace agreement as chief negotiator, received the award in 2015. Yazidi activist Nadia Murad, who later received the Nobel Peace Prize, was among the 2018 recipients.

== Leadership ==
Melanne Verveer is the institute's executive director. Hillary Clinton is its honorary founding chair. Carla Koppell, formerly chief strategy officer at USAID, is managing director.
