= Arthur Lake =

Arthur Lake may refer to:

- Arthur Lake (bishop) (1569–1626), English bishop of Bath and Wells
- Arthur Lake (MP) (1598–1633), English member of House of Commons from 1624 to 1626
- Arthur Lake (actor) (1905–1987), American actor known as Dagwood Bumstead, bumbling husband of Blondie

== See also ==
- Arthur Lakes (1844–1917), American geologist, artist, writer, teacher and minister
- Lake Arthur (disambiguation)
