= Lake Arthur =

Lake Arthur may refer to:

Canada

- Lake Arthur (Quebec), a lake in the Côte-Nord administrative region, Quebec.

New Zealand

- Lake Arthur (West Coast), a lake in the West Coast region, South Island
- Lake Rotoroa (Tasman), formerly known as Lake Arthur

United States

- Lake Arthur, Louisiana, a town in Jefferson Davis Parish
- Lake Arthur (Minnesota), a lake in Polk County
- Lake Arthur, New Mexico, a town in Chaves County
- Lake Arthur, Pennsylvania, a lake in Butler County
- Lake Arthur (Washington), a lake in Spokane, next to Gonzaga University
- USS Lake Arthur (ID-2915), a ship in the United States Navy named after the Louisiana town

== See also ==
- Arthurs Lake (Tasmania), a lake in Australia
