= Women, Peace and Security Index =

Countries' ranking

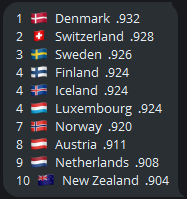
WPS index 2023 top countries

The Women, Peace and Security Index (WPS) scores and ranks countries in terms of women's security, justice, and inclusion. The index is widely used to compare countries as well as their development trends over time.

== Description ==
The index is published by the Georgetown Institute for Women, Peace and Security and the PRIO Centre on Gender, Peace and Security with support from the Norwegian Ministry of Foreign Affairs. As of October 2023, four indexes have been released.

The researchers use a total of 13 indicators, spanning from employment and education regulations to perceptions of violence and safety. The index takes into account proximity to armed conflict, financial inclusion, share of parliamentary seats, and other parameters. Information is gathered from various sources such as the World Bank, the United Nations, and the Gallup World Poll. Scores are on a scale of 0 to 1.

There are major implications of the WPS reports and scores. The WPS is highly correlated with other indexes, most notably the Human Development Index, the Notre Dame Global Adaptation Index, and the Fragile States Index. These correlations demonstrate that when women are doing well in a society, it is also more peaceful, democratic, and prosperous. The WPS score is a more consistent predictor of these features than a country's GDP, indicating that women's rights and gender equality are integral to a country's state. The index also gives insight into specific domains in which every country can improve.

== Indicators ==
In its initial form, the WPS used 11 indicators across 3 dimensions. In the newest edition from 2023/2024, it used 13 indicators.

=== Inclusion ===
Inclusion is defined as being economic, social, and political. This dimension contains five indicators.

1. Education, measured as the average number of years of education of women 25 years and older.
2. Financial inclusion, measured as percentage of women with a bank account (individual or joint).
3. Employment, measured as a percentage of women between ages 25-64 in the formal or informal workplace.
4. Cellphone use, measured as women above the age of 15 who have a mobile phone that they can use for personal calls.
5. Parliamentary representation, measured as percentage of seats held by women.

=== Justice ===
Justice is defined as formal and informal discrimination. This dimension contains four indicators.

1. Absence of legal discrimination, scored from 0-100 to reflect how the law protects women's opportunities across 35 life and work aspects.
2. Access to justice, scored from 0-4 based on the extent to which women are able to exercise justice in court without threat to safety.
3. Maternal mortality, measured as the number of maternal deaths due to pregnancy-related causes per 100,000 live births
4. Son bias, measured as the number of boys born per 100 girls, with a rate of 1.05 being the highest natural demographic.

=== Security ===
Security is defined as being at the individual, community, and societal levels. This dimension contains four indicators.

1. Intimate partner violence, measured as the percentage of women whom have had a partner in their lifetime and have experienced physical or sexual violence by a partner in the past 12 months.
2. Community safety, defined as the percentage of women and girls older than 15 who were polled by Gallup World Poll and answered that they felt safe walking alone where they live.
3. Political violence targeting women, measured as the number of political violence events against women per 100,000 women.
4. Proximity to conflict, measured as percentage of women living within 50 kilometers of an armed conflict.

== Past Reports ==
=== 2017/2018 Report ===
The 2017/2018 WPS Report was the inaugural report that debuted the index. It ranked 153 countries, covering more than 98% of the world's population. The top 12 countries all scored at or above 0.845, with top three scorers in order being Iceland, Norway, and Switzerland. The bottom dozen countries scored at or below 0.56. There was a larger disparity here, with the bottom three countries in order being Syria, Afghanistan, and Yemen, with Syria and Afghanistan both receiving a score of 0.385. In contrast, Iceland's score was 0.886.

=== 2019/2020 Report ===
The 2019/2020 WPS Report expanded with additional data to 167 countries. In this report, the top dozen countries all scored above 0.870. The top three in order were Norway, Switzerland, and Finland. The bottom three countries were Yemen, Afghanistan, and Syria. The top scorer, Norway, received a score of 0.904, with the bottom scorer, Yemen, receiving a score of 0.351. This edition of the WPS also added subnational reports for three of the most populous countries (China, India, and Nigeria) to reflect diversity within each.

There were several significant findings of this report. Almost every country, excluding Iceland, scored poorly in at least one dimension. General trends across all countries showed that all three dimensions improved from the 2017/2018 report. However, on individual indicators such as parliamentary representation and employment, progress had stalled.

=== 2021/2022 Report ===
The 2021/2022 WPS Report ranked a total of 170 countries. From the 2017 report to the 2021 report, there was a global average increase of 9 percent in WPS scores. 90 countries had an increase of 5 percent or more. The top dozen countries scored at or above 0.879, with the top three in order being Norway, Finland, and Iceland. The bottom three countries were Afghanistan, Syria, and Yemen. Syria, the lowest scorer, was given a score of 0.278, compared to the top scorer Norway with 0.922. A notable addition to this report was Palestine, which ranked 160th. The pace of progress slowed dramatically, cut by nearly half compared to the pace from 2017 to 2019, largely attributed to the COVID-19 pandemic.

=== 2023/2024 Report ===
The 2023/2024 WPS Report is the most recent. It scored and ranked 177 countries. Four indicators were changed or new in this report, meaning that directly comparing scores from this year to past reports will not be the most accurate measure. Notably, all of the top dozen scoring countries were above 0.9, compared to only four in 2021. All of the lowest dozen countries were below 0.45, compared to only three being below that threshold in 2021. The top three countries were Denmark, Switzerland, and Sweden, with Denmark receiving a score of 0.932. The lowest three countries were Afghanistan, Yemen, and the Central African Republic, with Afghanistan receiving a score of 0.286.

There was again wide disparities between the scores for the three dimensions within many countries, showing that all countries have room for improvement. Additionally, the report found that 600 million women (15% of the world's women) lived within 50 kilometers of an armed conflict in 2022.

== Countries ==
These are the scores and rankings from the 2023/2024 WPS Report.

Rank	Country	Score
1	Denmark	.932
2	Switzerland	.928
3	Sweden	.926
4	Finland	.924
4	Iceland	.924
4	Luxembourg	.924
7	Norway	.920
8	Austria	.911
9	Netherlands	.908
10	New Zealand	.904
11	Australia	.902
11	Belgium	.902
13	Estonia	.892
13	Ireland	.892
15	Singapore	.887
16	Lithuania	.886
17	Canada	.885
18	Czechia	.884
19	Portugal	.877
20	Latvia	.872
21	Germany	.871
22	United Arab Emirates	.868
23	Japan	.866
24	France	.864
25	Croatia	.862
26	United Kingdom	.860
27	Poland	.859
27	Spain	.859
29	Slovakia	.856
30	South Korea	.848
31	Malta	.846
32	Hungary	.835
32	Serbia	.835
34	Italy	.827
35	Bulgaria	.826
36	Slovenia	.824
37	United States	.823
38	Taiwan	.818
39	Georgia	.812
39	Hong Kong	.812
41	Montenegro	.808
42	Romania	.800
43	Seychelles	.799
44	North Macedonia	.798
45	Albania	.796
46	Mongolia	.794
47	Barbados	.779
48	Armenia	.772
49	Guyana	.769
50	Argentina	.768
51	Greece	.766
52	Thailand	.764
53	Moldova	.758
54	Panama	.757
55	Bosnia and Herzegovina	.754
56	Bahrain	.752
56	Russian Federation	.752
58	Turkmenistan	.750
59	Uruguay	.748
60	Costa Rica	.743
60	Sri Lanka	.743
61	Kuwait	.742
63	Cyprus	.739
64	Cabo Verde	.738
64	Fiji	.738
64	Malaysia	.738
67	Saudi Arabia	.737
68	Chile	.736
69	Belarus	.733
70	Kazakhstan	.729
71	Trinidad and Tobago	.721
72	Maldives	.720
73	Nicaragua	.717
73	Peru	.717
75	Oman	.715
76	Samoa	.711
77	Jamaica	.710
78	Viet Nam	.707
79	Lao PDR	.704
80	Israel	.703
80	Qatar	.703
82	Bhutan	.700
82	China	.700
82	Indonesia	.700
85	Tonga	.697
86	Bolivia	.696
87	Suriname	.694
88	Puerto Rico	.692
89	Paraguay	.691
90	Tajikistan	.690
91	South Africa	.688
92	Jordan	.679
93	Mauritius	.678
94	Uzbekistan	.674
95	Kyrgyzstan	.673
96	Tunisia	.669
97	Azerbaijan	.667
98	Dominican Republic	.666
99	Turkey	.665
100	Kosovo	.664
100	Solomon Islands	.664
100	Timor-Leste	.664
103	Rwanda	.663
104	Botswana	.659
105	Belize	.657
106	Ecuador	.655
107	Tanzania	.652
108	Ghana	.651
109	Sao Tome and Principe	.648
110	Cambodia	.645
110	Egypt	.645
112	Nepal	.644
112	Vanuatu	.644
114	Morocco	.637
115	Brazil	.630
116	Venezuela	.628
117	Ukraine	.626
118	Algeria	.622
119	Equatorial Guinea	.619
119	Senegal	.619
121	Philippines	.612
122	Honduras	.610
122	Libya	.610
122	Namibia	.610
125	Lesotho	.605
126	Zimbabwe	.604
127	Angola	.598
128	India	.595
128	Lebanon	.595
128	Togo	.595
131	Bangladesh	.593
131	Gabon	.593
132	Colombia	.582
134	Mozambique	.580
135	Gambia	.575
136	Côte d’Ivoire	.573
137	Guatemala	.569
138	Benin	.566
138	El Salvador	.566
140	Iran	.557
141	Zambia	.556
142	Mexico	.551
143	Uganda	.544
144	Sierra Leone	.543
145	Guinea	.539
146	Ethiopia	.521
146	Malawi	.521
148	Comoros	.519
149	Kenya	.511
150	Congo	.507
151	Mauritania	.506
152	Madagascar	.505
153	Djibouti	.504
154	Liberia	.500
155	Papua New Guinea	.487
156	Guinea-Bissau	.483
156	Palestine	.483
158	Burkina Faso	.481
158	Mali	.481
158	Pakistan	.481
161	Cameroon	.466
162	Nigeria	.465
163	Chad	.462
164	Sudan	.460
165	Myanmar	.451
166	Niger	.442
167	Haiti	.431
168	Iraq	.424
169	Somalia	.417
170	Eswatini	.415
171	Syrian Arab Republic	.407
172	Burundi	.394
173	South Sudan	.388
174	Democratic Republic of the Congo	.384
175	Central African Republic	.378
176	Yemen	.287
177	Afghanistan	.286

== See also ==
- Gender Development Index
- Gender Inequality Index
- Gender Parity Index
- Global Gender Gap Report
- Global Peace Index
- Women's Economic Opportunity Index
