= Dori Tunstall =

American educator and design anthropologist

Elizabeth "Dori" Tunstall (born January 28, 1972 Columbia, South Carolina) is a design anthropologist. She was dean of the faculty of design at OCAD University (Ontario College of Art and Design University) in Toronto, Canada, from 2016 to 2023, and the first black dean of a faculty of design anywhere. Tunstall holds a PhD and an MA in anthropology from Stanford University [1994–1999] and a BA in anthropology from Bryn Mawr College [1990–1994].

== Professional life ==
In a 2011 Design Taxi article titled Design Anthropology: A Coming of Age, Rachel Xu wrote that Design Anthropology found its initial impetus in the dot-com boom of the nineties. Incessant developments in technologies in that decade meant little time was available to train young designers to understand the context in which their work was being developed for. Designers who possessed more than just a creative flair then began to apply their craft and knowledge to different—and bigger—fields.

Tunstall began her professional life in the nineties defining user experience and strategy at Chicago-based E-Lab, where she "undertook ethnographic anthropological research on everything from men’s grooming to community use of telecommunications." Tunstall's social sciences training was valued among interactive and product design firms aiming for a more rigorous approach to user experience and research. E-Lab was an experience-based research firm, leading a new marketing philosophy with a direct approach: Understand how real people experience real products to create innovative product concepts and services. The idea challenged companies to forget conventional market research (focus groups, consumer surveys, targeted test markets) because a breakthrough approach has tapped into the consumer behavior patterns that drive everyday purchasing trends. E-Lab pioneered that breakthrough. Cambridge-based Sapient Corporation, an IT provider and e-services consulting group for Global 1000 companies and startups, acquired E-Lab in 1998. E-Lab became Experience Modeling, one of five strategic disciplines that Sapient incorporated into its organization. Tunstall was a Sr. Experience Modeler, for Sapient Corporation from 1999 to 2002 then moved on to Arc Worldwide, a Leo Burnett/Publicis Company where she was a Sr. Experience Planner from 2003 to 2005. At Arc Tunstall immersed herself in hardcore advertising and marketing furthering expanding her range of experience and insight.

After the turn of the century Tunstall focused on academic and civic-minded pursuits. In 2005 Tunstall became associate director, City Design Center, University of Illinois at Chicago and associate professor of Design Anthropology, School of Art + Design, University of Illinois at Chicago and began her career as an academic leader. From 2005 to 2006 she also served as the managing director of Design for Democracy, an ongoing AIGA program that applies design tools and thinking to "increase civic participation by making interactions between the U.S. government and its citizens more understandable, efficient and trustworthy. Design for Democracy collaborates with researchers, designers and policy-makers in service of public sector clients and AIGA’s goal of demonstrating the value of design by doing valuable things." In 2008 Tunstall organized the U.S. National Design Policy Summit and Initiative focused on creating an actionable agenda of U.S. Design policy for economic competitiveness and democratic governance. In 2009 Tunstall became associate dean of learning and teaching, Faculty of Design, and associate professor of design anthropology, Faculty of Health, Arts, and Design at Swinburne University of Technology in Melbourne, Australia. In 2010 Tunstall found the Cultures-Based Innovation Initiative focused on the use of tangible and intangible cultural heritage to drive irreversible changes in peoples' attitudes, behaviors, and/or values that directly benefit communities under social and environmental distress.

In October 2022, Tunstall was honored the Education Award at the Black Artists + Designs Guild (BADG) in New York City.

== Perspectives on design anthropology ==
Tunstall describes design anthropology as an evolving, "interdisciplinary field that seeks to understand the role of design artifacts and processes in defining what it means to be human (e.g., human nature). It is more than lists of user requirements in a design brief, which makes it different from contextual inquiry, some forms of design research, and qualitative focus groups. Design anthropology offers challenges to existing ideas about human experiences and values." She recommends design take some precautions. "Marking the boundaries between respectful knowing and making, design anthropology lives across and within design’s desire to serve as a positive force in the universe by drawing attention across evolving human values, the making of environments, objects, communications, and interactions that express those values, and the experiences that give interpretation to those values and their meanings. But design must learn to tread respectfully in order to avoid becoming another colonizing practice."

Evolution of design anthropology

- In the beginning, design anthropology was about researchers as interpretive experts, delivering and recommendations to design teams and others.
- In the 1990s this evolved toward Participatory Design in which interdisciplinary teams participated in observations and defining insights. Insights are delivered in the form of experience models and personas. Researchers become facilitators with multiple, complex stakeholders involved.
- She [Tunstall] proposes that the next phase of Design Anthropology will establish the academic foundation of this practice. With that will come a focus on social issues and an understanding of how objects affect the people around them. Designs are disruptions to the people in a culture and those disruptions should be studied. This study of objects and processes define what it means to be human. Design can seek to close the gap between the disruption and the ideal experience.

Principles of design anthropology

- Value systems and cultures ought to be accepted as dynamic, not static. Each generation goes through the process of negotiating the elements that make up their value systems and cultures.
- One ought to recognize the mutual borrowing that happens among value systems and cultures, and seek to mitigate or eliminate the unequal circumstances in which that borrowing takes place.
- One must look simultaneously at what is expressed as that to be gained, lost, and created new in the recombination of value systems and cultures by a group of people.
- One should seek to eliminate false distinctions between art, craft, and design in order to better recognize all culturally important forms of making as a way in which people make value systems tangible to themselves and others.
- One ought to create processes that enable respectful dialogue and relational interactions such that everyone is able to contribute their expertise equally to the process of designing and those contributions are properly recognized and remunerated.
- Projects should use design processes and artifacts to work with groups to shift hegemonic value systems that are detrimental to the holistic well-being of vulnerable groups, dominant groups, and their extended environments.
- The ultimate criteria for success of any Design Anthropology engagement are the recognized creation of conditions of compassion among the participants in the project and in harmony with their wider environments.

Teaching design anthropology
Tunstall has described the teaching of design anthropology as a hybrid praxis of:

- critical anthropological and design theory
- anthropological and participatory design research methods
- design studio and social systems making

Tunstell suggests a shift in design education to focus on how students and staff exist ontologically, or ‘be,’ in the world rather than solely how they see the world.
