= FlyerTalk =

Internet forum

- Website type: Online community
- Founded: 1998; 28 years ago
- Headquarters: El Segundo, California, {{{location_country}}}
- Founder: Randy Petersen
- Parent: Internet Brands
- Website: www.flyertalk.com
- Launched: 28 February 1999; 27 years ago

FlyerTalk (stylized in lowercase) is an Internet forum for discussion of airline frequent-flyer programs, hotel loyalty programs and other issues related to travel. The site was founded in 1998 by Randy Petersen and was acquired by Internet Brands in 2007.

== History ==
According to Petersen, as editor of InsideFlyer, he saw FlyerTalk as a way to allow readers to combine their knowledge into a knowledge base. On November 16, 2010, Petersen stated that he would leave FlyerTalk at the end of the year.

In March 2011, he launched MilePoint. MilePoint's brand was changed to InsideFlyer as Petersen started to build a global footprint with local languages in various countries around the world.

== Industry Use ==
Some of the hotel and airline forum participants include official presences who use the site to learn about issues important to their customer base. One example of the site's influence was a wager between the Continental Airlines CEO Larry Kellner and a site member as to whether 60 or more community members would voluntarily fly (using their own miles and incurring their own out-of-pocket expenses) to a feedback meeting in Houston for the airline; 274 did. The forum has been cited as a powerful voice in shaping airlines' reward programs and as a source for novel ways to use frequent flier miles.

== See also ==
- List of Internet forums
