= John Lake (journalist) =

American journalist

- Born: John Eric Lake; February 18, 1930; Albany, New York, U.S.
- Disappeared: December 10, 1967 (aged 37); New York, U.S.
- Status: Declared dead in absentia 1975 (aged 45)
- Education: Syracuse University
- Occupations: Sports journalist and editor
- Employer(s): New York Herald Tribune; Newsweek
- Spouse: Alice Conlon
- Website: johnlake.com

John Eric Lake (born February 18, 1930; disappeared December 10, 1967), an American journalist, was the sports editor of Newsweek until his mysterious disappearance.

== Personal background ==
John Eric Lake was born February 18, 1930, in Albany, New York. He graduated in 1951 with a B.A. degree in journalism from Syracuse University, where he met his wife Alice Conlin. The couple married in 1952 while Lake was serving in the U.S. Navy in Honolulu, Hawaii. He returned to graduate school at Syracuse after he was discharged from the U.S. Navy. The couple had a daughter and a son. His wife and children later moved to New Jersey and then to Islesford, Cranberry Island, Maine. John Lake was declared missing in December 1967 and deceased by a court in New Jersey in 1975.

== Career ==
John Lake in his Newsweek office in September 1967.

The Binghamton News Press hired both John Lake and his wife in 1952, and he worked in sports while she wrote features. In 1959 Lake became a staff writer at the New York Herald Tribune. Lake worked with Red Smith while at the Tribune. In February 1964, he moved to Newsweek to become its sports editor. He succeeded Dick Schaap in this role. In his last year at the magazine, Lake authored three cover stories (nine in four years) on such varied topics as "The Black Athlete", the Indy 500 and the World Series. Lake was hired as a ghost writer for Bob Gibson's autobiography and had all but submitted the work. Lake's last issue for Newsweek was the December 11, 1967, issue with a cover featuring a dark-haired, bespectacled Robert McNamara, asked, "Why is He Leaving?" After Lake's disappearance in 1967, he was replaced as sports editor six months later by Pete Axthelm, a writer for Sports Illustrated.

John Lake is also the author of the book Jim Ryun: Master of the mile published in 1968 after his disappearance.

== Disappearance ==
John Lake was last seen in midtown Manhattan, New York City, on December 10, 1967. At that time, he was walking toward the subway to go home. A missing persons report was filed by his wife, Alice, four days later. His disappearance was investigated by the Pinkerton Detective Agency, which was hired by Newsweek. Years after, a police officer from missing persons showed his son a February 1968 photo of a corpse who closely resembled Lake but could not be positively identified.

Missing Person documents:

- New York Police Agency Case Number: 29273
- NCIC Number: M-563761275
- NamUs MO#4386

== Reactions ==
Lake was admired by other journalists and athletes. Peter Benchley, author and screenwriter, who edited the Radio/TV section at Newsweek at the time, admitted to being intimidated by him. Mario Andretti, auto race driver, called him the most prepared journalist from the national media that ever interviewed him. Bert Sugar, boxing raconteur, recalls it was John Lake that moved press conferences from showmanship to seriousness with a single question.

== See also ==
- List of people who disappeared
