= InsideFlyer =

- Categories: Frequent-flyer news
- Circulation: 76,000
- Publisher: Randy Petersen
- Founder: Randy Petersen
- Founded: 1986
- Final issue: January 2015 (print)
- Company: Frequent Flyer Network
- Based in: Colorado Springs, Colorado
- Website: insideflyer.com
- ISSN: 1061-4494
- OCLC: 25317403

InsideFlyer is a website specializing in frequent-flyer news.

InsideFlyer began as a monthly print publication founded in Colorado Springs, Colorado, in 1986 by Randy Petersen, which provided information on earning and redeeming frequent-flyer miles and points. The print magazine's monthly circulation was around 76,000, and more readers visit the online site. The magazine recommended flexibility in trying to redeem frequent-flyer miles and points.

Petersen went on to found frequent-flyer forum FlyerTalk in 1998. The site was acquired by Internet Brands in 2007. In March 2011, he founded online publication MilePoint, which was relaunched as InsideFlyer on October 10, 2015, as a rebranded global community. New features include integrating mileage, travel itinerary tracking and social features to keep up with other members of the travel community.

The print magazine's last issue was January 19, 2015 ending its 28 years, 11 months and 11 days in publishing.
