= Zaman Molla =

Iranian table tennis player

Zaman Molla (born August 17, 1979 in Tehran) is a former Iranian National Team table tennis player. Zaman Molla played his first game of table tennis at age 14 and 17, and was the top player on the Iran Junior National Table Tennis Team. In addition to playing for the national team and leagues, Zaman has been coaching table tennis for over fifteen years and is certified by International Table Tennis Federation. As one of the top-ranked players in the United States, Zaman has won first place in over two dozen tournaments in California, including the LATT Open, Grace Lin Open, Santa Monica Open, California State Open, ICC California State Open, Pacific Coast Open, and many more.

He is currently ranked #7 player in USA.
