= Charles H. Lake =

American educational administrator and author

Charles Lake
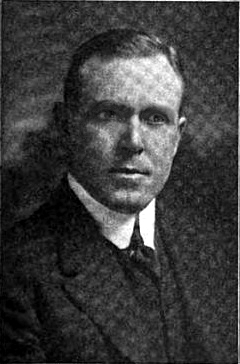
- Charles Lake c.1916
- Born: February 2, 1879; Granville, Ohio, US
- Died: December 14, 1958 (aged 79); Cleveland, US
- Resting place: Lake View Cemetery, Cleveland, Ohio, US

Charles Henry Lake (January 2, 1879 in Granville, Ohio – December 14, 1958 in Cleveland, Ohio) was an American educational administrator and author. He was superintendent of the Cleveland Metropolitan School District from 1933 to 1947. During Lake's administration each school had a radio station, school safety programs, and classes for the disabled, among other changes. Also Lake is the first school superintendent in Cleveland to have a school named after him.

== Early life ==
Lake was born in Granville, Ohio. Lake graduated from Ohio State University in 1910 and studied at the University of Chicago afterward. At the age of nineteen he served in the Spanish–American War. After he was discharged he taught and served as an administrator in schools in Columbus, Alexandria, and Hamilton, Ohio, before coming to Cleveland in 1916 as principal at East-Tech High School. Lake was later promoted to assistant superintendent of Cleveland schools in 1919, assistant superintendent in charge of senior high schools in 1921, superintendent of Cleveland Public Schools in September 1933. Charles Lake was an author of textbooks that specialize in science and mathematics. Lake advocated creative financing of schools. He kept the board of education apprised of both sides of controversial issues. After leaving superintendency in 1947, Lake served as a consultant to the Cleveland Board of Education for a year and a half.

== Marriage ==
After Lake graduated from Ohio State he married Edna Thornton. They resided in Shaker Heights, Ohio with their son Thornton and daughter Elizabeth. Lake served as the president of the City of Cleveland Club in 1926 and, was appointed trustee of Kent State University in 1936. In 1946 Lake served as president of the American Association of School Administrators (AASA), which he was later given lifetime membership four years later.

== Death ==
Charles Lake died on December 14, 1958, at the age of 79. He is buried in Lake View Cemetery.

== Charles Lake School ==
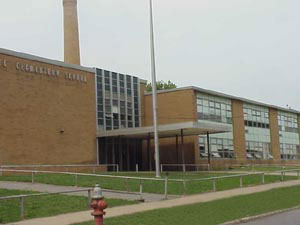
Charles Lake School, 1980s

In 1961 a school was built and named in his honor. The name of the school was Charles H. Lake Elementary School. It

was located at 9201 Hillock Avenue, Cleveland, Ohio which was part of the Cleveland Metropolitan School District.

Their mascot was nicknamed the Eagles and Lighthouses.

In October 2007, the building was demolished to make way for new construction. In the process, the school moved to Louis Pasteur Elementary on Linn Drive. On June 4, 2010, Charles Lake was closed indefinitely by the Academic Transformation Plan that was issued by the Cleveland Public School System due to constant low test scores and enrollment. The school's original site remains a high-fenced field to this day.
