= Valmaine Toki =

New Zealand legal academic

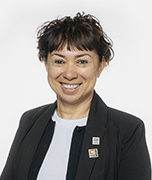
- Toki in 2019
- Occupations: Barrister, solicitor, academic
- Known for: Work on indigenous issues and Māori legal matters
- Title: Professor

Academic background
- Education: BA, LLB, LLM, MBA, Ph.D.
- Alma mater: University of Auckland (BA, LLB, LLM), University of Tasmania (MBA), University of Waikato (Ph.D.)
- Thesis: A Case for an Indigenous Court - a realisation of self-determination? (2016)

Academic work
- Discipline: Law
- Sub-discipline: Indigenous rights, Māori legal issues
- Institutions: University of Waikato

Valmaine Toki is a New Zealand barrister, solicitor, author, Māori rights advocate and academic. Toki is Professor of Law at the University of Waikato, New Zealand.

In 2009, Toki drew attention to the historical and ongoing challenges of Māori representation in Auckland's governance, criticizing the government's rejection of the Royal Commission's recommendation for dedicated Māori seats on the Auckland Council.

In 2011, Toki became the first New Zealander and first Māori appointed by the President of the UN Economic and Social Council as an independent expert to the United Nations Permanent Forum on Indigenous Issues where she served two terms of three years (2011–2017).

In 2019, Toki was elected to the Aotea/Great Barrier Island Local Board. In 2022 she was appointed by the President of the Human Rights Council to the United Nations Expert Mechanism on the Rights of Indigenous Peoples (EMRIP), as an independent expert, and the first New Zealander and Māori appointee. In July 2024, she was appointed chair of EMRIP.

== Early life and education ==
Toki is a Māori woman, of Ngati Rehua, Ngati Wai, Ngāpuhi and Ngati Whatua descent.

Toki studied law at the University of Auckland, followed by a master's degree as a He Ture Pumau Scholar in business administration at the University of Tasmania, Australia, supported by the Treaty of Waitangi Fisheries Commission. Her master's focused on marine resources management. She also finished her LLM at the University of Auckland.

As part of Toki's doctoral research into the disproportionate offending rates of Māori people in the New Zealand's criminal justice system, she travelled to different jurisdictions to study community court systems. Toki completed her PhD in 2016 at the University of Waikato. Her thesis was titled "A Case for an Indigenous Court: a realisation of self-determination?".

== Career ==
Toki worked for Te Ohu Kai Moana Trustee Ltd on Māori fisheries, aquaculture, and asset allocation. In 2007 she was appointed to a law lecturer position at the University of Auckland and taught in the areas of contemporary Treaty of Waitangi and Māori issues, jurisprudence and legal method.

In 2009, Toki highlighted the ongoing issue of Māori representation in Auckland's governance, referencing historical context and developments. Despite recommendations from the Royal Commission on Auckland Governance for Māori seats on the then-new Auckland council, the government chose not to support these recommendations. Toki emphasized the unique status of Māori as tangata whenua and criticized the equating of Māori rights with those of other minority groups.

In 2011, Toki was the first New Zealander and first Māori appointed by the President of the UN Economic and Social Council as an independent expert on the United Nations Permanent Forum on Indigenous Issues where she served two terms of three years. In 2022, She was appointed by the president of the UN Human Rights Council to the UN Expert Mechanism on the Rights of Indigenous Issues. Toki also became the first Māori and first New Zealander to hold the title.

In 2012 Toki commenced her role at Te Piringa, Faculty of Law, University of Waikato where she remains as of 2024.

In 2018, her book Indigenous courts, self-determination and criminal justice was published and advocates for the establishment of a marae-based Indigenous court in New Zealand.

In 2023, she delivered the annual Dame Silvia Cartwright lecture on the recognition of Indigenous Rights for the Auckland Women’s Lawyers Association.

In 2024, her book Indigenous rights, climate change and governance: Measuring success and data published by Edward Elgar Publishing she explores the how Indigenous rights are recognised to ameliorate the adverse effects of climate change, within Artificial Intelligence and an Indigenous right to space.

On July 8 2024, Toki was appointed Chair of the United Nations Expert Mechanism on the Rights of Indigenous Peoples (EMRIP).

== On Tikanga Māori ==
Toki understands Tikanga Māori as the correct way of doing things and derived from cosmology, customs and practices. She highlights that Tikanga is a fluid system influenced by context, encompassing mechanisms such as mana, tapu, and mauri, which regulate relationships to achieve balance. Toki emphasizes that for Tikanga to adapt to societal changes it must retain its foundational principles. In an interview to Aoetea, she reflected on her time at the UN Permanent Forum on Indigenous Issues, where she implemented Tikanga principles in international policy work.

== Selected publications ==
=== Books ===
- Toki, Valmaine (2024). Indigenous rights, climate change and governance: Measuring success and data. Edward Elgar Publishing. ISBN 978- 1-80392-497-7
- Toki, Valmaine (2018). Indigenous courts, self-determination and criminal justice (1st ed.). Taylor & Francis. ISBN 978-0-367-40442-0. OCLC 1105721953.

=== Selected peer reviewed articles ===
- Toki, Valmaine ‘Recognition and relevance of Indigenous Rights – Dame Silvia Cartwright Lecture ‘NZWLJ 2024 v 8, pp 240 – 256.
- Toki, Valmaine. ‘The place of tikanga’ NZULR 2023, v 30 (3), pp 457 – 472.
- Toki, Valmaine, and Durgeshree Raman. "Indigenous and Minority Activism under the United Nations." International Journal on Minority and Group Rights 1 (2024): 19. doi:10.1163/15718115-bja10172
- Toki, Valmaine. "Is There an Indigenous Right to Space?" The Transnational Journal of Aviation and Space Laws (TJASL), Centre for Aviation and Space Laws, 2021.
- Toki, Valmaine. "Respecting and recognising Indigenous rights when challenged by commercial activities." International Journal of Critical Indigenous Studies 10, no. 1 (2017): 1-17. doi:10.3316/informit.303985572323716
- Toki, Valmaine. "Seeking Access to Justice for Indigenous Peoples." Yearbook of New Zealand Jurisprudence 15 (2017): 25-45.
- Toki, Valmaine. "Understanding a Critical Indigenous Law Perspective to Intellectual Property." Intellectual Property Quarterly, no. 4 (2017): 369-381.
- Toki, Valmaine. "Legal responses to mental health: Is therapeutic jurisprudence the answer–the experience in New Zealand." (2017): 1-18.
- Toki, K. R. (2017). "The Maori economy and access to justice." Yearbook of New Zealand Jurisprudence, 15, 102-117.
- Beaton, Angela, Maui Hudson, Moe Milne, Ramari Viola Port, Khyla Russell, Barry Smith, Valmaine Toki et al. "Engaging Māori in biobanking and genomic research: a model for biobanks to guide culturally informed governance, operational, and community engagement activities." Genetics in Medicine 19, no. 3 (2017): 345-351. doi:10.1038/gim.2016.111
- Toki, Valmaine. "Maori seeking self-determination or Tino Rangatiratanga? A note." (2017): 134-144.
- Toki, Valmaine. "Decolonization and the Right of Self-Determination for the Pacific." In Studies in Law, Politics, and Society, edited by Austin Sarat, Vol. 70, 181-207. Leeds: Emerald Group Publishing Limited, 2016. doi:10.1108/S1059-433720160000070013
- Hudson, Maui, Khyla Russell, Lynley Uerata, Moe Milne, Phillip Wilcox, Ramari Viola Port, Barry Smith, Valmaine Toki, and Angela Beaton. "Te Mata Ira—Faces of the Gene: Developing a cultural foundation for biobanking and genomic research involving Māori." AlterNative: An International Journal of Indigenous Peoples 12, no. 4 (2016): 341-355. doi:10.20507/AlterNative.2016.12.4.1
- Beaton, Angela, Barry Smith, Valmaine Toki, Kim Southey, and Maui Hudson. "Engaging Maori in Biobanking and Genetic Research." International Indigenous Policy Journal 6, no. 3 (2015): 1-19. doi:10.18584/iipj.2015.6.3.1
- Valmaine, Toki. "Unpacking Indigenous Rights." Acta Humana–Emberi Jogi Közlemények 3, no. Special Edition (2015): 85-98.
- Toki, Valmaine. "‘Tikanga Maori–a constitutional right’? A case study." Commonwealth law bulletin 40, no. 1 (2014): 32-48. doi:10.1080/03050718.2013.866049
- Toki, Valmaine. "Therapeutic jurisprudence and mental health courts for Maori." International Journal of Law and Psychiatry 33, no. 5-6 (2010): 440-447. doi:10.1016/j.ijlp.2010.09.014
- Toki, Valmaine. "Adopting a Maori property rights approach to fisheries." NZJ Envtl. L. 14 (2010): 197.
- Toki, Valmaine. "Are Domestic Violence Courts working for indigenous peoples?." Commonwealth law bulletin 35, no. 2 (2009): 259-290. doi:10.1080/03050710902924338

=== Selected peer-reviewed UN reports ===
- Toki, Valmaine. "Study on Decolonialization of the Pacific Region." United Nations Permanent Forum on Indigenous Issues, Twelfth Session, New York, May 20-31, 2013. E/C.19/2013/12.
- Toki, Valmaine, Megan Davis, Simon William M’Viboudoulou, Paul Kanyinke Sena, Edward John, Álvaro Esteban Pop Ac, and Raja Devasish Roy. "A Study on National Constitutions and the United Nations Declaration on the Rights of Indigenous Peoples." United Nations Permanent Forum on Indigenous Issues, Twelfth Session, New York, May 20-31, 2013. E/C.19/2013/18.
