= Kelly L. Franznick =

American web designer

- Education: Illinois Institute of Technology (M.Des.)
- Occupations: Businessman; Designer
- Organization: Blink UX
- Website: kellyfranznick.com

Kelly L. Franznick is an American businessman and designer. He co-founded Blink UX, where he serves as the chief innovation officer.

== Early life and education ==
Franznick is from Bainbridge Island, Washington. He holds a Master of Design (M.DES.) degree from the Illinois Institute of Technology.

== Career ==
In 2000, Franznick co-founded Blink with Karen Clark Cole. Since then, Blink has made six acquisitions, including Blue Flavor in 2010 and Eye Level Interaction Design in 2011. The company operates in five cities, and has worked on projects such as restructuring NASA.gov and assisting a VR company with equipment design.

Over the years, Blink has received multiple awards and recognition, including the Tech Impact Award in 2015, inclusion in list of the 100 Fastest-Growing Private Companies in Washington in 2015, being named one of the Best Small Companies in America by Forbes in 2016, and making the Middle Market Fast 50 list in 2021.

In 2019, Franznick was honored with the Mikey Award for his outstanding work in user experience design.

In 2021, Mphasis acquired Blink UX for $94 million.

== Awards and recognition ==
- 2019: Mikey Award
