= David Lake =

David Lake may refer to:

- David Lake (architect) (born 1950s), American architect
- David Lake (coach) (born 1964), Australian rules football coach
- David Lake (winemaker) (1943–2009), American winemaker
- David Lake (writer) (1929–2016), Indian-born Australian science fiction writer, poet, and literary critic
- David A. Lake (born 1956), American political scientist and president of the American Political Science Association
