= Lake Arthur (Minnesota) =

Lake in the state of Minnesota, United States

- Location within Minnesota
- Location: Polk County, Minnesota
- Coordinates: 47°33′58″N 96°14′8″W
- Type: lake

Lake Arthur is a lake in Polk County, near the town of Fertile in the U.S. state of Minnesota.

Lake Arthur was named for Chester A. Arthur (1829–1886), American politician and 21st President of the United States.

== See also ==
- List of lakes in Minnesota
