= Gowalla =

American location-based social networking service

Coordinates: 30.2691°N 97.7495°W

- Company type: Subsidiary
- Website type: Social networking
- Headquarters: Austin, Texas, United States
- Key people: Josh Williams, Scott Raymond, Keegan Jones, Andy Ellwood
- Employees: 30
- Parent: Meta Platforms, Inc.(2011–present)
- Launched: 2007; 19 years ago
- Current status: Online

Gowalla is a location-based social networking service. It originally launched in 2007 and closed in 2012, but was relaunched on March 10, 2023. Users are able to check in at "Spots" in their local vicinity, either through a dedicated mobile application or through the mobile website. Checking-in will sometimes produce virtual "items" for the user, some of which are developed to be promotional tools for the game's partners. As of November 2010 there were approximately 600,000 users. In January 2021, Gowalla made an announcement that the app is coming back in 2022.

At the start of December 2009 it was reported that Gowalla had raised $8.4 million in a round of venture capital funding led by Greylock Partners and angel investors Chris Sacca, Kevin Rose and Jason Calacanis. It was acquired by Facebook on December 2, 2011, for an undisclosed sum Gowalla, Inc. was based in Downtown Austin, Texas. On March 10, 2012, Gowalla announced it would cease operation and users would be able to download their checkins, photos and lists soon. However, this seems to have fallen through, as the site was made unavailable before these histories could be downloaded.

== Overview ==
Gowalla is a primarily mobile application that allows users to check into locations that they visit using their mobile device. This is done either through the use of dedicated applications available on Google Android, iPhone, Windows Phone, Palm WebOS, and BlackBerry, or via the service's mobile website. Check-ins can be pushed via Notifications to iPhones, and by linking accounts, to Twitter and Facebook.

"Trips", which as of January 2010 can be made by any user, linked together up to 20 related spots, grouped into categories such as Nature Hikes or Pub Crawls.

Some Spots and Trips are "featured" by Gowalla, being highlighted on their website and awarded a special status and icon. Featured spots tend to be local landmarks such as Buckingham Palace in London, while featured trips were chosen for being "unique and exciting". Within the Gowalla community, certain users have an elevated status above that of normal users. Whereas every user could create a spot and maintain its details, members of the Street Team are able to move and edit any unlocked spots. This includes the ability to merge duplicate spots.

In early versions of the service, users will occasionally receive a virtual "Item" as a bonus upon checking in, and these items can be swapped or dropped at other spots. Users become "Founders" of a spot by dropping an item there. Items form a key feature within the game and each user has a vault into which they can place items they want to keep. In a September 2011 update, items and the user's vault became less of a focus of the application and were removed from the user experience. Many users were unhappy with the removal of Items.

On December 2, 2010, Gowalla released version 3.0 for the iPhone 4, allowing Gowalla users to check in using Foursquare, Facebook Places, Twitter, and Tumblr, or view friends' check-ins from other services. In March 2011 an Android version of Gowalla was released. This allowed the same features that applied to the iPhone 4 to be used on Android phones; it also updated the interface dramatically to introduce a new "Passport" look. In June 2011 a Windows Phone 7 version of Gowalla was released with a similar feature set.

On September 22, 2011, version 4.0 was released, transitioning away from a check-in service to one featuring friends' "Stories" and curated "Guides". This guide feature would reappear in a later venture by founder Josh Williams, Goji, debuting in 2014.

The acquisition of Gowalla by Facebook was announced on December 2, 2011. Gowalla, as a service, was shut down on March 11, 2012. Gowalla stated that Facebook would not be acquiring any of Gowalla's user data.

On October 20, 2020 Josh Williams announced a return of Gowalla with a new concept for Spring 2021. The revamped app was released on the iPhone on March 10, 2023. On April 20, 2023, Gowalla announced through their members-only Discord server that they had paused active development.

== Awards ==
Gowalla won the Mobile category in the 2010 South by Southwest Interactive awards.

== See also ==
- Geosocial networking
- Location-based service
