= José Mollá =

José Mollá is an advertising executive who co-founded la comunidad/the community with his brother Joaquin Molla in 2001. The agency has offices in Miami, New York, San Francisco, London and Buenos Aires. He is currently la comu's global chief creative officer.

La comunidad/the community was selected as one of the 25 most influential advertising agencies of the last 50 years, by Campaign magazine.
