= Publicis Sapient =

American digital transformation consulting company

- Formerly: Publicis.Sapient, SapientRazorfish, Sapient Consulting, SapientNitro, Razorfish, Sapient Global Markets, Sapient Public Sector, Sapient
- Type: Subsidiary
- Industry: Consumer Products; Energy & Commodities; Financial Services; Health; Public Sector; Retail; Telecommunications, Media & Technology; Transportation & Mobility; Travel & Hospitality
- Founded: 1990; 36 years ago
- Headquarters: United States
- Services: Strategy & Consulting; Customer Experience & Design; Technology & Engineering; Marketing Platforms; Data & Artificial Intelligence; Innovation & Digital Product Management; Digital Business Transformation
- Revenue: $1.305 billion (2013)
- Operating income: $125.22 million (2013)
- Number of employees: 20,000+ (February 13, 2019)
- Parent: Publicis
- Website: www.publicissapient.com

Publicis Sapient is a technology company operating as an independent subsidiary of Publicis Groupe. It was originally established as Sapient in Cambridge, Massachusetts in 1990. In 2015, Sapient became an independent subsidiary of French multinational advertising firm Publicis, following a deal worth US$3.7 billion. It remains headquartered in Boston, Massachusetts, and as of February 2015, the leadership is retained.

In 2016, the company merged two of its divisions, SapientNitro and Razorfish, to form SapientRazorfish, which was led by Alan Wexler. A few years later, in 2019, SapientRazorfish and Sapient Consulting were consolidated into one brand, Publicis Sapient, under the leadership of CEO Nigel Vaz.

== History ==
The company Sapient was founded on November 6, 1990, by Jerry Greenberg and J. Stuart Moore in Cambridge, Massachusetts. The company was established as a digital consulting firm and adopted a fixed-term, fixed-price model for IT consulting projects instead of charging on a time and materials basis.

Sapient embraced internet-based technology early on and by 1999, internet-based work accounted for over 70% of its revenue. From 1992 to 2000, the company saw rapid growth, with revenue increasing from $950,000 to $503 million.

Following the dot-com bubble burst in the early 2000s, Sapient looked to expand internationally to drive growth. The company implemented a strategy called "Global Distributed Delivery" which leveraged the rapidly growing tech market in India to grow its software development capabilities.

Throughout its history, Sapient has made several acquisitions, starting with Planning Group International in 2006. Other notable acquisitions include DCG Group in 2008, which enhanced its capital markets offerings, and The Nitro Group in 2009, which added 300 employees.

=== History of acquisitions ===
Year	Name	Division	Refs
2023	Corra	Publicis Sapient	
2022	Tremend	Publicis Sapient	
2016	Vertiba	Sapient	
2014	Campfire	SapientNitro	
2014	OnPoint	Government Services	
2014	The Community (aka La Comunidad)	SapientNitro	
2013	iThink	SapientNitro	
2013	(m)PHASIZE	SapientNitro	
2012	SecondStory	SapientNitro	
2011	DAD	SapientNitro	
2011	CLANMO	SapientNitro	
2009	Nitro	SapientNitro	
2008	Derivatives Consulting Group (DCG)	Global Markets	
2008	iChameleon	Sapient	
2006	Planning Group International (PGI)	Sapient	
2005	Business Information Solutions	Sapient	
2000	Human Code	Sapient	
2000	The Launch Group	Sapient	
1999	Adjacency	Sapient	
1999	E-Lab	Sapient	
1998	Studio Archetype	Sapient	
1997	Exor	Sapient	

== Corporate affairs ==
In 1996, Sapient made its initial public offering with a share price of $21. In the next four years, the technology sector saw an increase in share prices, leading to an increase in Sapient's shares to a split-adjusted price of $550. However, during the dot-com bust of 2000, Sapient's shares dropped to a low of $0.75 per share. The shares reached a peak of $17.95 in 2014.
