= Women's Economic Opportunity Index =

Statistic index

Women's Economic Opportunity Index, 2012

The Women's Economic Opportunity Index is an index compiled by the Economist Intelligence Unit that measures the enabling environment for women's economic participation in 128 countries. The Economist Intelligence Unit's Women's Economic Opportunity Index is based on 29 indicators that measure a country's laws, regulations, practices, customs and attitudes that allow women to participate in the workforce under conditions roughly equal to those of men, whether as wage-earning employees or as owners of a business. The index was first produced in 2010, with an updated index produced in 2012. Three indicators were added and 15 new countries were assessed in the 2012 version of the Index.

According to the latest issue of the Index, for 2012 Norway and Sweden kept their top positions from 2010 with scores of 90.4 and 88.3, respectively. Chad and Sudan remained at the bottom of the index with scores of 23.3 and 19.2, respectively. Countries that had the most changes from the 2010 index included Kenya, which went from 90th place to 86th place. The Index suggests that this change occurred because the Kenyan government enacted new policies mandating equal pay for equal work, and made sexual harassment in the workplace illegal. Thailand moved up one place from 2010 to 2012; the index claimed that Thai women gained greater support for business skills training more than any of their regional counterparts. Saudi Arabia's score increased from 35.9 in 2010 to 39.7 in 2012 mainly due to a ministerial order that included equal remuneration for men and women.

In 2019, the index was superseded by the World Bank's Women, Business and the Law index.

== Methodology ==
The Women's Economic Opportunity Index uses a quantitative and qualitative scoring model, constructed from 29 indicators, measuring specific attributes of the environment for women employees and entrepreneurs in 128 economies. Five category scores are calculated from the unweighted mean of underlying indicators and scaled from 0–100, where 100=most favourable. These categories are: Labour policy and practice (which comprises two sub-categories: Labour policy and Labour practice); Access to finance; Education and training; Women's legal and social status; and the General business environment. Each category or sub-category features several underlying indicators. The overall score (from 0–100) is calculated from an average of the unweighted category and indicator scores.

Data for the quantitative indicators are drawn from national and international statistical sources. Some qualitative indicators were created by the Economist Intelligence Unit, based on legal documents and texts; others have been drawn from a range of surveys and data sources and adjusted by the Economist Intelligence Unit.

The sources used in the Women's Economic Opportunity Index are the Economist Intelligence Unit; the International Labour Organization (ILO); the World Bank Group; the International Monetary Fund; the Organisation for Economic Co-operation and Development (OECD); the United Nations Educational, Scientific and Cultural Organization (UNESCO); the United Nations Development Programme (UNDP); the United Nations Department of Economic and Social Affairs, Population Division; the UN Secretary-General’s database on violence against women; the International Telecommunication Union (ITU); Social Security Online; the Consultative Group to Assist the Poor (CGAP); the World Economic Forum; the World Health Organization; Worldwide Governance Indicators; Freedom House; Vision of Humanity; and national statistical offices.

== 2012 rankings ==
Rank	Country	Score
1	Sweden	90.4
2	Norway	88.3
3	Finland	88.2
4	Belgium	87.7
5	Australia	87.1
6	Germany	86.3
7	Netherlands	85.0
8	New Zealand	83.7
9	Canada	83.2
10	Iceland	83.0
11	Denmark	81.3
12	France	79.5
13	United Kingdom	78.9
14	United States	78.4
15	Portugal	77.3
16	Lithuania	77.0
17	Austria	76.3
18	Slovenia	76.2
19	Switzerland	76.1
20	Luxembourg	75.4
21	Hungary	74.9
22	Hong Kong	74.7
23	Ireland	74.6
24	Spain	74.0
25	Japan	73.9
26	Slovakia	73.8
27	Bulgaria	73.5
28	Latvia	72.1
29	Estonia	71.7
30	Israel	71.5
31	Singapore	71.4
32	Italy	70.9
33	Czech Republic	70.8
34	Poland	70.2
35	South Korea	69.4
36	Greece	68.7
37	Mauritius	67.7
38	South Africa	65.3
39	Uruguay	65.3
40	Macedonia	65.3
41	Mexico	64.6
42	Chile	64.2
43	Romania	62.2
44	Croatia	61.9
45	Costa Rica	61.1
46	Panama	60.6
47	Thailand	60.1
48	Brazil	59.5
49	Tunisia	59.5
50	Argentina	59.2
51	Montenegro	58.2
52	Bosnia and Herzegovina	58.1
53	Malaysia	57.7
54	Albania	56.5
55	Serbia	56.4
56	Peru	55.8
57	Ukraine	55.4
58	Colombia	55.3
59	Georgia	54.5
60	Moldova	54.5
61	Kazakhstan	54.5
62	Belarus	53.8
63	Namibia	53.6
64	Armenia	53.3
65	Turkey	53.2
66	Russia	52.9
67	El Salvador	52.4
68	China	52.3
69	Paraguay	52.1
70	Venezuela	51.8
71	Ecuador	51.2
72	United Arab Emirates	50.8
73	Dominican Republic	50.5
74	Philippines	50.3
75	Mongolia	50.0
76	Kuwait	49.9
77	Botswana	49.9
78	Bahrain	49.0
79	Lebanon	48.7
80	Egypt	48.7
81	Fiji	48.5
82	Oman	48.2
83	Nicaragua	47.8
84	Sri Lanka	47.6
85	Indonesia	47.5
86	Kenya	47.5
87	Vietnam	47.1
88	Honduras	47.0
89	Morocco	47.0
90	Azerbaijan	46.8
91	Ghana	46.4
92	Bolivia	46.0
93	Jordan	45.9
94	Kyrgyzstan	45.7
95	Tanzania	45.4
96	Cambodia	44.6
97	Uzbekistan	44.0
98	India	41.9
99	Samoa	41.7
100	Tajikistan	41.5
101	Benin	40.8
102	Uganda	40.4
103	Saudi Arabia	39.7
104	Algeria	39.7
105	Bangladesh	39.2
106	Vanuatu	39.1
107	Malawi	39.0
108	Senegal	38.7
109	Laos	38.6
110	Tonga	38.6
111	Timor-Leste	36.9
112	Zambia	36.9
113	Burkina Faso	36.8
114	Cameroon	36.1
115	Syria	35.9
116	Pakistan	35.5
117	Iran	35.4
118	Turkmenistan	34.4
119	Nigeria	33.4
120	Madagascar	32.7
121	Côte d'Ivoire	30.8
122	Togo	30.7
123	Ethiopia	30.3
124	Solomon Islands	29.2
125	Papua New Guinea	26.6
126	Yemen	24.6
127	Chad	23.3
128	Sudan	19.2

== See also ==
- Gender-related Development Index
- Gender Empowerment Measure
- Human development (humanity)
- Human Development Index
- Democracy Index
