= SAS Ground Handling =

SAS Ground Handling is Europe's third-largest full-service provider of aircraft ground handling and airport related services. SAS Ground Handling is the largest ground-handling company in Scandinavia.

== History ==
As of 1 July 2010 SAS Ground Services is renamed to SAS Ground Handling. SAS Ground Handling serves more than 30 airports in Denmark, Norway and Sweden and has about 8400 employees. SAS Ground Handling is owned by the SAS Group. As part of the Core-SAS strategy formed by the SAS Group in February 2009, some of SAS Ground Handling operations were divested or outsourced:

- SAS Ground Services Finland was divested to ISS Palvelut in July 2009.
- SAS Ground Services UK was divested to ASIG in June 2010.

On 7 March 2013 Swissport International Ltd. ("Swissport") and Scandinavian Airline Systems ("SAS") announced that they signed a letter of intent creating the basis for continued negotiations between the two companies, aiming at an agreement to transfer full ownership of SAS Ground Handling in Denmark, Sweden and Norway to Swissport. As a first step, both parties intended to establish a joint venture company to which the business and operations of SAS Ground Handling and Spirit (cargo handling) would be transferred.

As of September 1, 2013 SAS Ground Handling was divided into three divisions, SGH Norway, SGH Sweden and SGH Denmark, respectively, in preparation for the planned sale to Swissport. At the same time, Swissport, in according with the letter of intent, have bought 10% shares in each of these three divisions, while negotiations still continued.

In May 2016 SAS, however, announced its intentions to retain control of the operations at main airports.

== Major customers ==
- Aeroflot
- airBaltic
- Air Canada
- Air China
- Air Europa
- Air France
- ASL Airlines Belgium
- Atlantic Airways
- Austrian Airlines
- Balkan Holidays Airlines
- British Airways
- Condor
- Corendon Airlines
- Corsairfly
- Cyprus Turkish Airlines
- Czech Airlines
- Danish Air Transport
- FedEx Express
- Freebird Airlines
- Icelandair
- Iran Air
- LOT Polish Airlines
- Lufthansa
- Lufthansa Cargo
- Norwegian Air Shuttle
- Nouvelair
- Novair
- Pakistan International Airlines
- Pegasus Airlines
- Ryanair
- SAS Scandinavian Airlines
- Singapore Airlines
- South African Airways
- Sun d'Or International Airlines
- Sunclass Airlines
- SunExpress
- TAP Air Portugal
- Thai Airways International
- Tunisair
- Turkish Airlines
- Widerøe
