= Volare =

Volare may refer to:

== Entertainment ==
- "Volare" (Domenico Modugno song), the popular name for the 1958 Italian song "Nel blu, dipinto di blu"
- "Volare" (Fabio Rovazzi song), a 2017 song by Fabio Rovazzi featuring Gianni Morandi
- Volare (film), a 2019 Italian film
- Volare (Coez album), a 2021 album by Coez
- Volare (Deana Martin album), a 2009 album by Deana Martin
- ¡Volaré! The Very Best of the Gipsy Kings, a 1999 compilation album by Gipsy Kings

== Other uses ==
- Volare Airlines (latterly "C.A.I. Second"), a defunct Italian passenger airline
- Volare Airlines (Ukraine), a defunct Ukrainian cargo airline
- Volare roller coaster, a ride manufactured by Zamperla
- Plymouth Volaré, a model of automobile

== Automotive ==
- Volare (Brazil), a Brazilian bus manufacturer
