= Aircraft ground handling =

Servicing of an aircraft while it is on the ground, typically at an airport gate

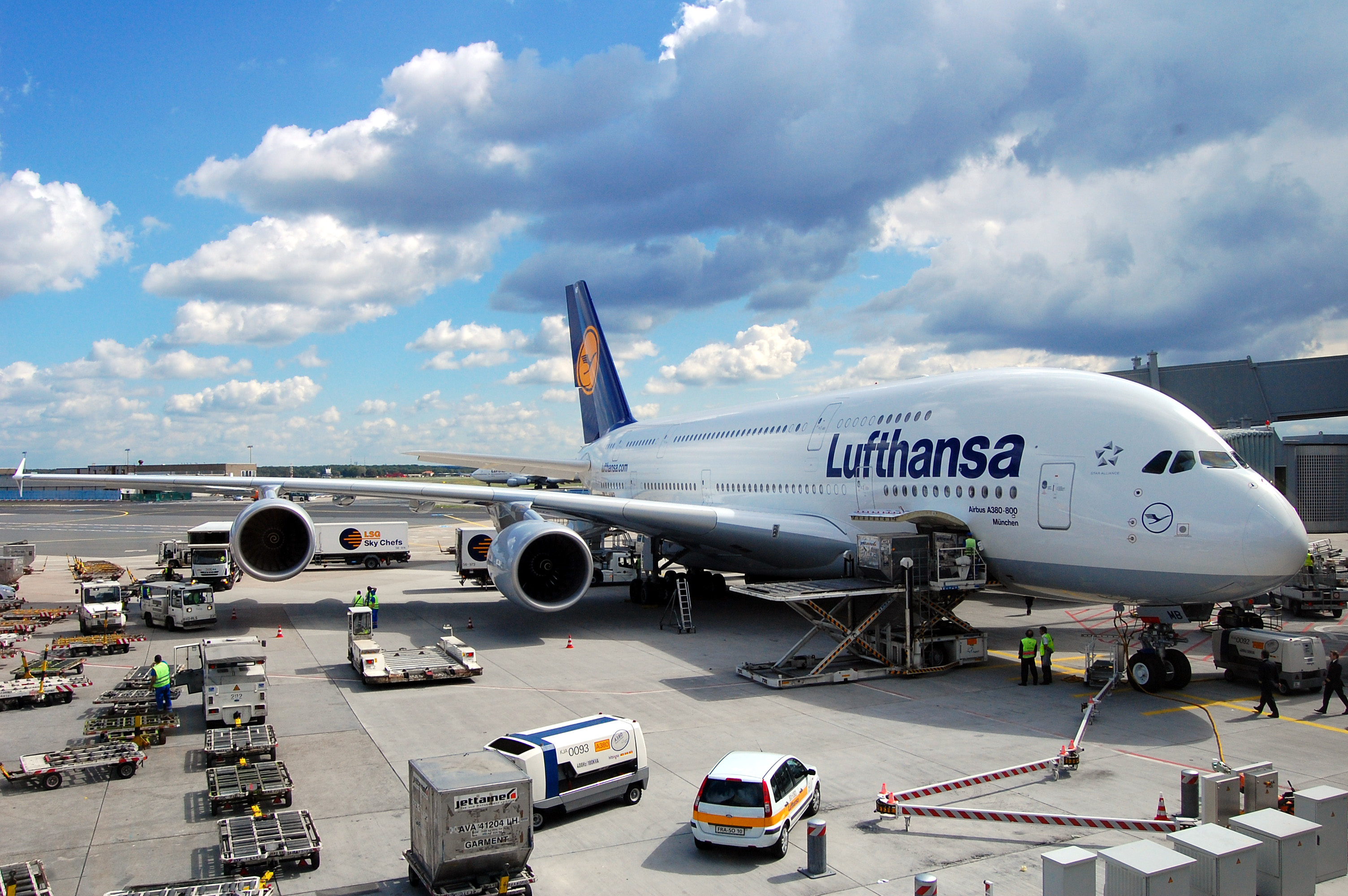
Aircraft ground handling of a Lufthansa Airbus A380 at Frankfurt Airport in Germany.

In aviation, aircraft ground handling or ground operations defines the servicing of an aircraft while it is on the ground and (usually) parked at a terminal gate of an airport.

== Overview ==
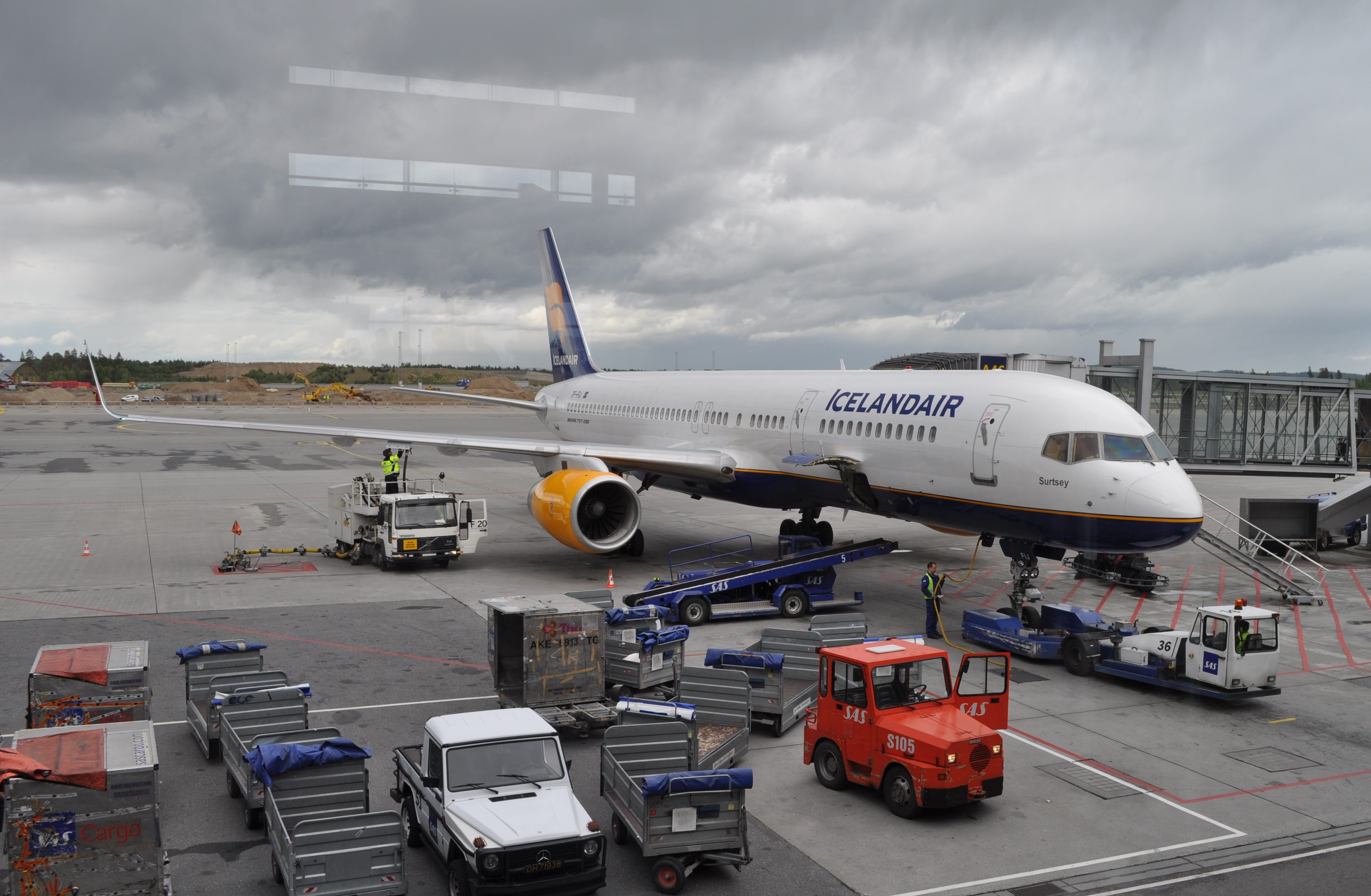
Icelandair Boeing 757 being serviced by another airline; SAS at Gardermoen Airport

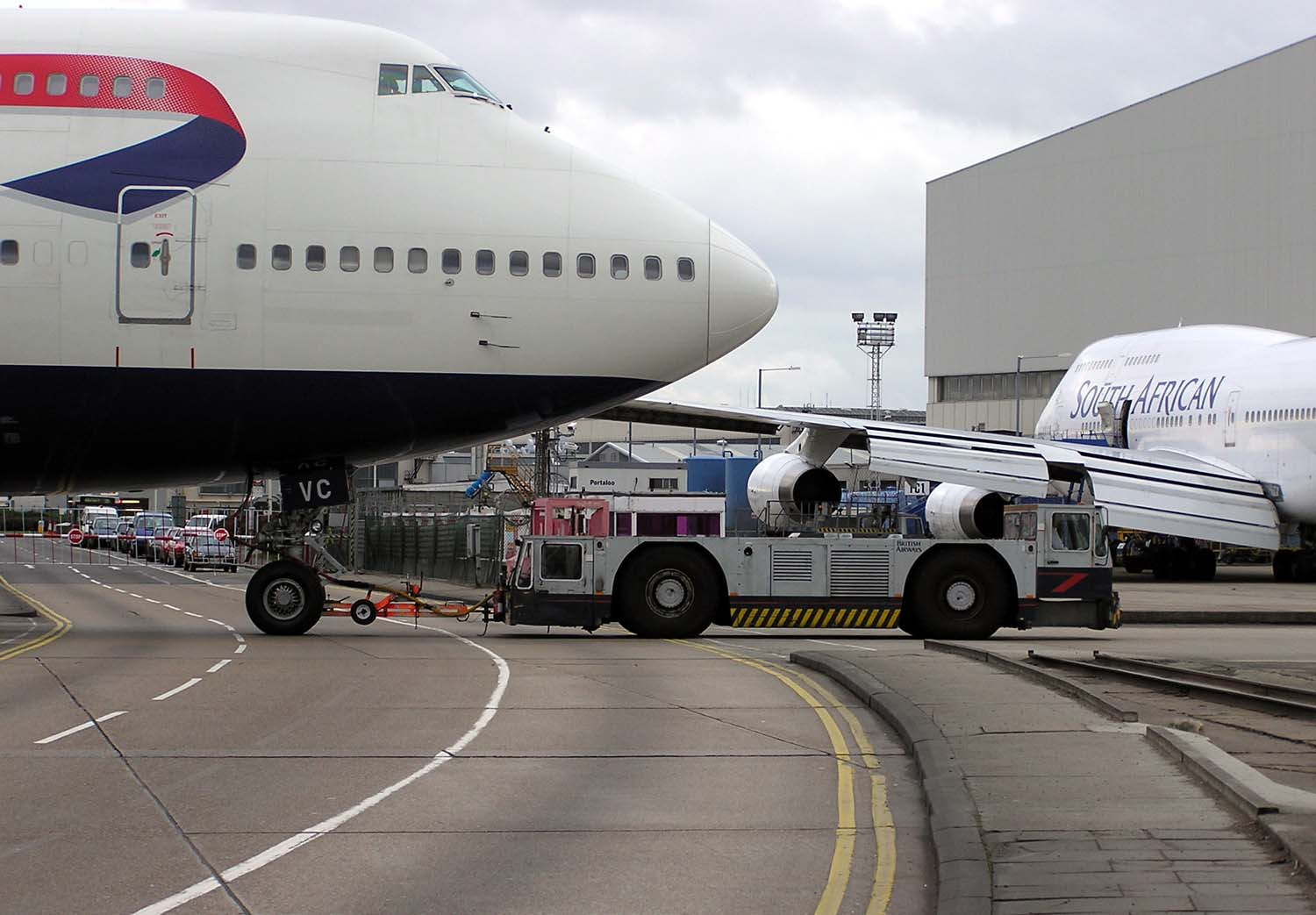
A ground-handling tug pulls a British Airways Boeing 747-400 at Heathrow Airport, England

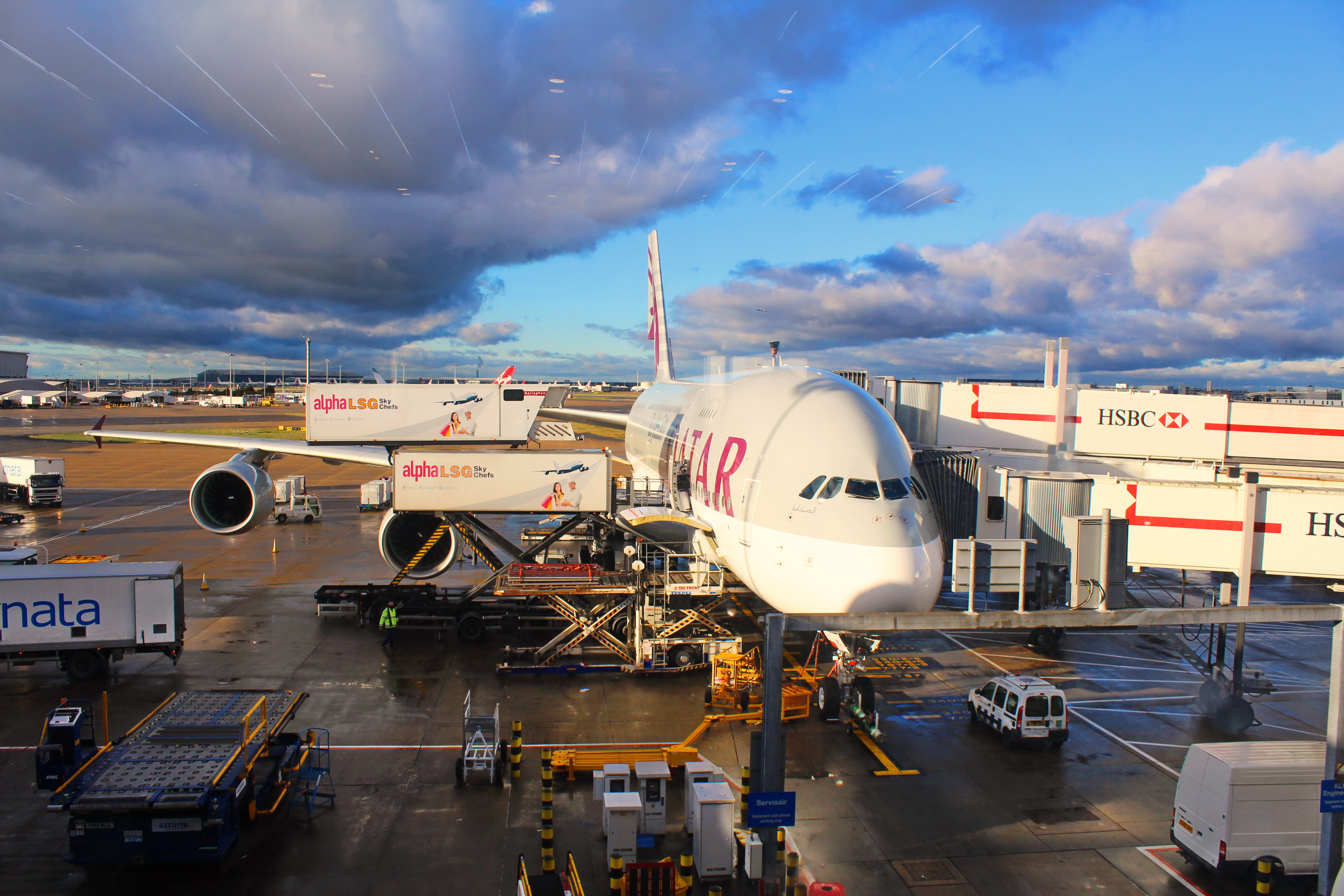
Airbus A380-800 operated by Qatar Airways on apron outside Heathrow Terminal 4 with a wide range of ground handling equipments around such as aircraft container, pallet loader, ULD, jet air starter, belt loader, pushback tug, catering vehicles and dollies.

Many airlines subcontract ground handling to airports, handling agents or even to another airline. According to the International Air Transport Association (IATA), conservative estimates indicate airlines outsource more than 50 per cent of the ground handling that takes place at the world's airports. Ground handling addresses the many service requirements of an airliner between the time it arrives at a terminal gate and the time it departs on its next flight. Speed, efficiency, and accuracy are important in ground handling services in order to minimize the turnaround time (the time during which the aircraft must remain parked at the gate). Faster turnarounds for lower ground times are correlated to better profits.

Airlines with less-frequent service or fewer resources at a particular location sometimes subcontract ground handling or on-call aircraft maintenance to another airline, as it is a short-term cheaper alternative to setting up its own ground handling or maintenance capabilities.

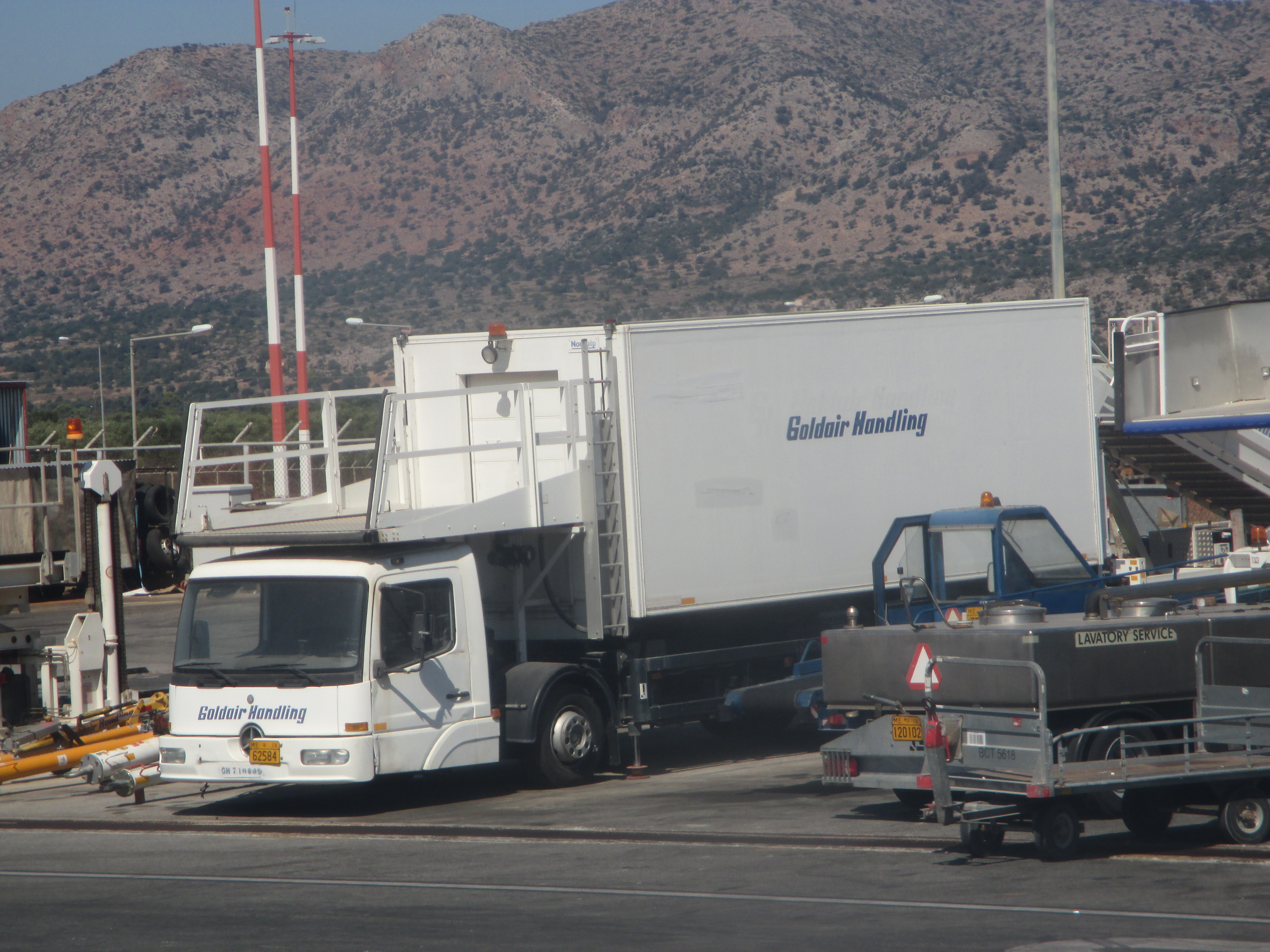
Catering-truck at Chania International Airport. Credit: Marius Vassnes

Airlines may participate in an industry-standard Mutual Assistance Ground Service Agreement (MAGSA). The MAGSA is published by the Air Transport Association (the current version is from 1981) and is used by airlines to assess prices for maintenance and support to aircraft at so-called MAGSA Rates, which are updated annually based on changes in the U.S. Producer Price Index. Airlines may choose to contract for ground handling services under the terms of a Standard Ground Handling Agreement (SGHA) published in the International Air Transport Association (IATA) Airport Handling Manual. Airlines may also contract for ground handling services under non-standard terms.

Most ground services are not directly related to the actual flying of the aircraft, and instead involve other tasks. The major categories of ground handling services are described below.

=== Aircraft appearance and provisioning ===
Services related to aircraft cleanliness and passenger comfort:

- Cabin cleaning – cleaning seats, galleys, and lavatories. Resetting the cabin (folding seatbelts, uniform seat and window shade position) to appear untouched.
- Lavatory service – exterior service of lavatory by draining and filling of waste tanks.
- Provisioning – replacing literature, blankets, pillows, and consumable supplies.
- Security search – searching aircraft for prohibited items as required by airline policy or regulatory requirement.
- Water service – exterior service of aircraft water system by filling tank with potable water for use inflight.

=== Catering ===
Catering includes the unloading of unused food and drink from the aircraft, and the loading of fresh food and drink for passengers and crew. In flight airline meals are delivered at the seats in airline service trolleys. Empty or trash-filled trolley from the previous flight are replaced with fresh ones. Meals are prepared mostly on the ground in order to minimize the amount of preparation (apart from chilling or reheating) required in flight.

While some airlines provide their own catering, others have either owned catering companies in the past and divested themselves of the companies, or have outsourced their catering to third-party companies. Airline catering sources include the following companies:

- Airline Services & Logistics PLC(EPZE)
- Atlas Catering (Royal Air Maroc)
- Cara Operations
- Cathay Pacific Catering Services (Cathay Pacific)
- DHL Supply Chain
- Gategourmet
- KLM Catering Services (KLM)
- LSG Sky Chefs
- Sky Cafe’
- Q Catering (Qantas)
- SATS Food
- Servair
- Thai Catering Services (Thai Airways)

=== Ramp service ===
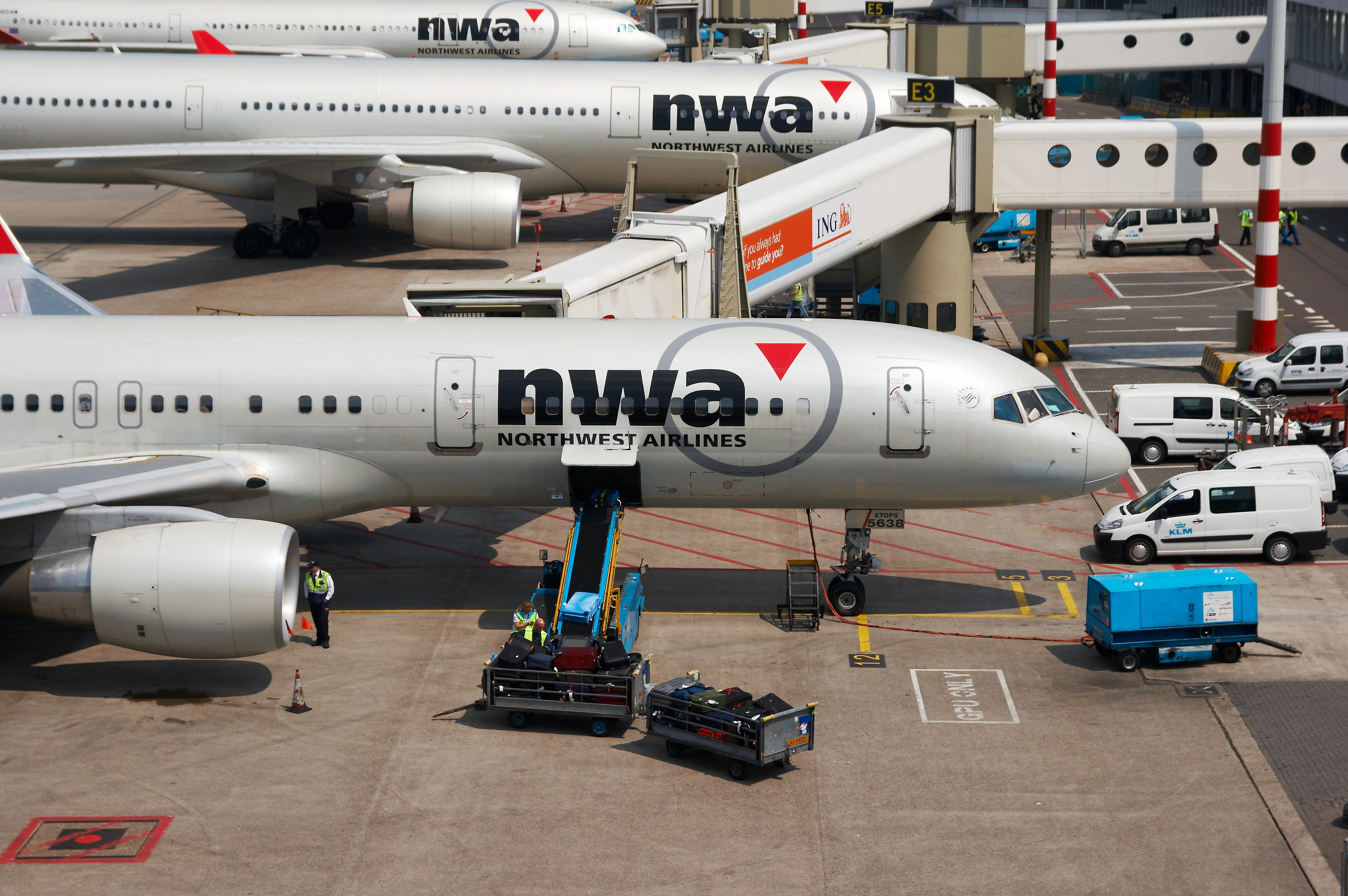
Luggage being unloaded from a Northwest Airlines Boeing 757-200 at Amsterdam Airport Schiphol

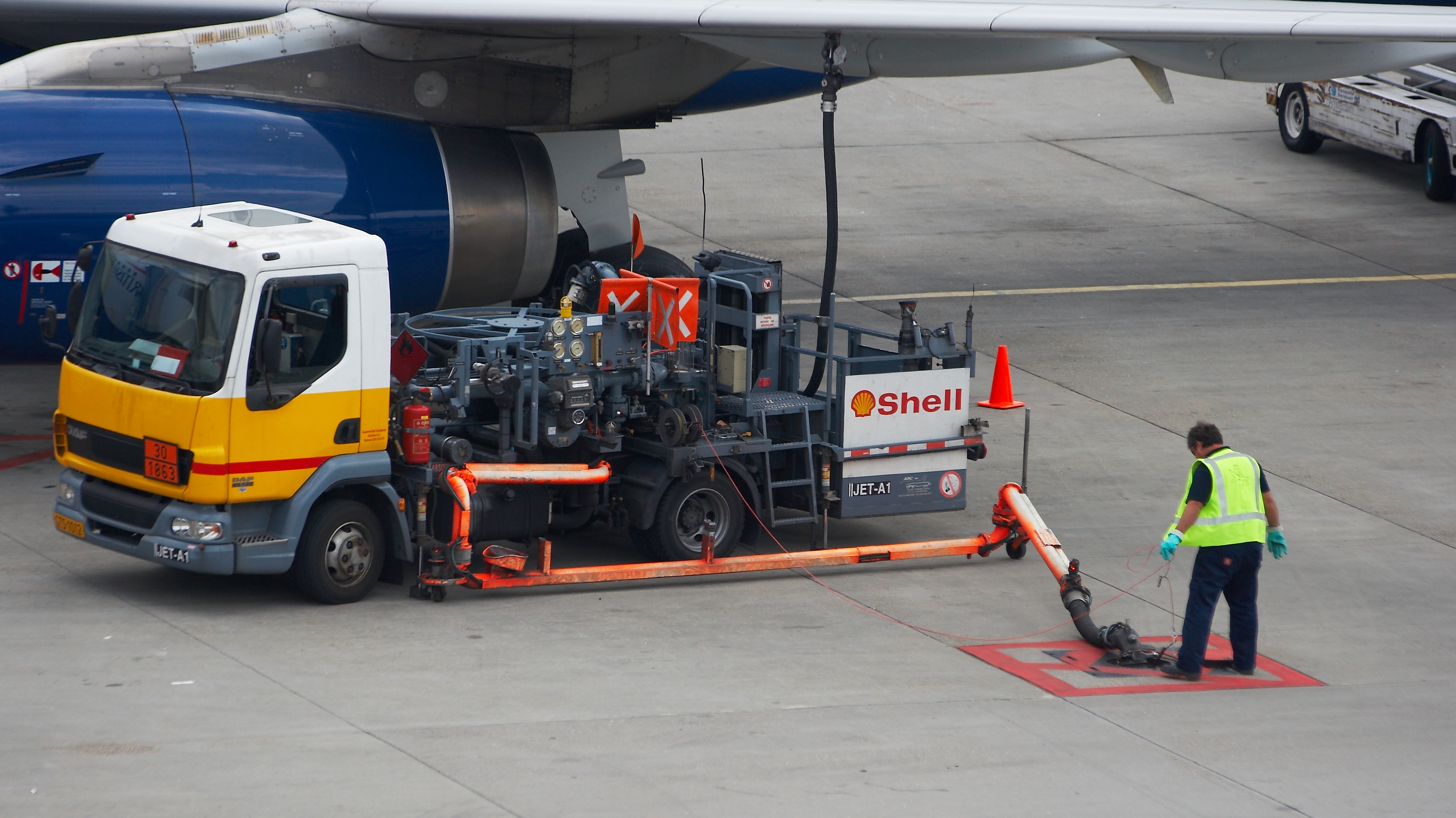
A British Airways aircraft being refueled

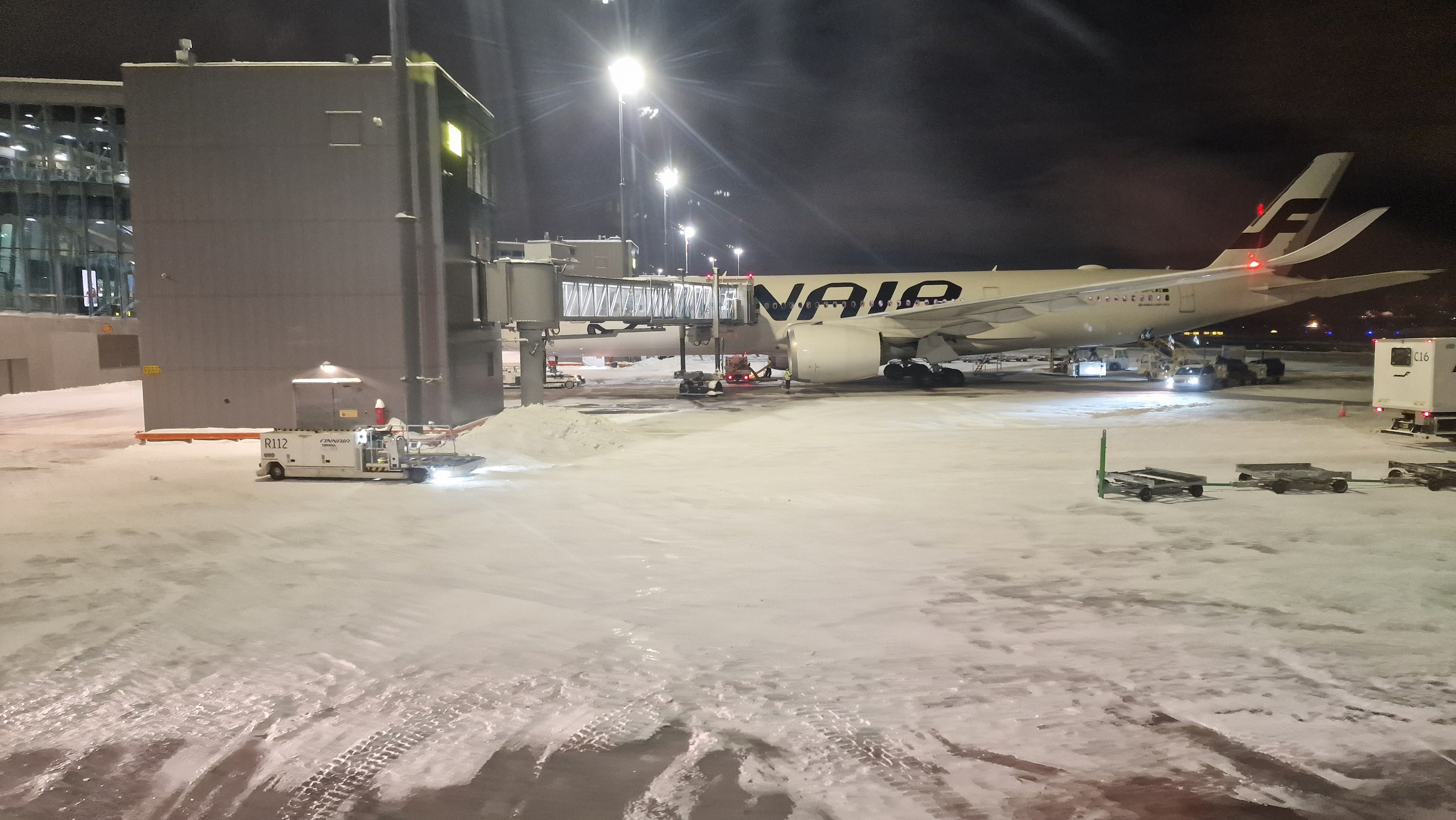
Finnair aircraft undergoing ground handling in snowy conditions at Helsinki Airport

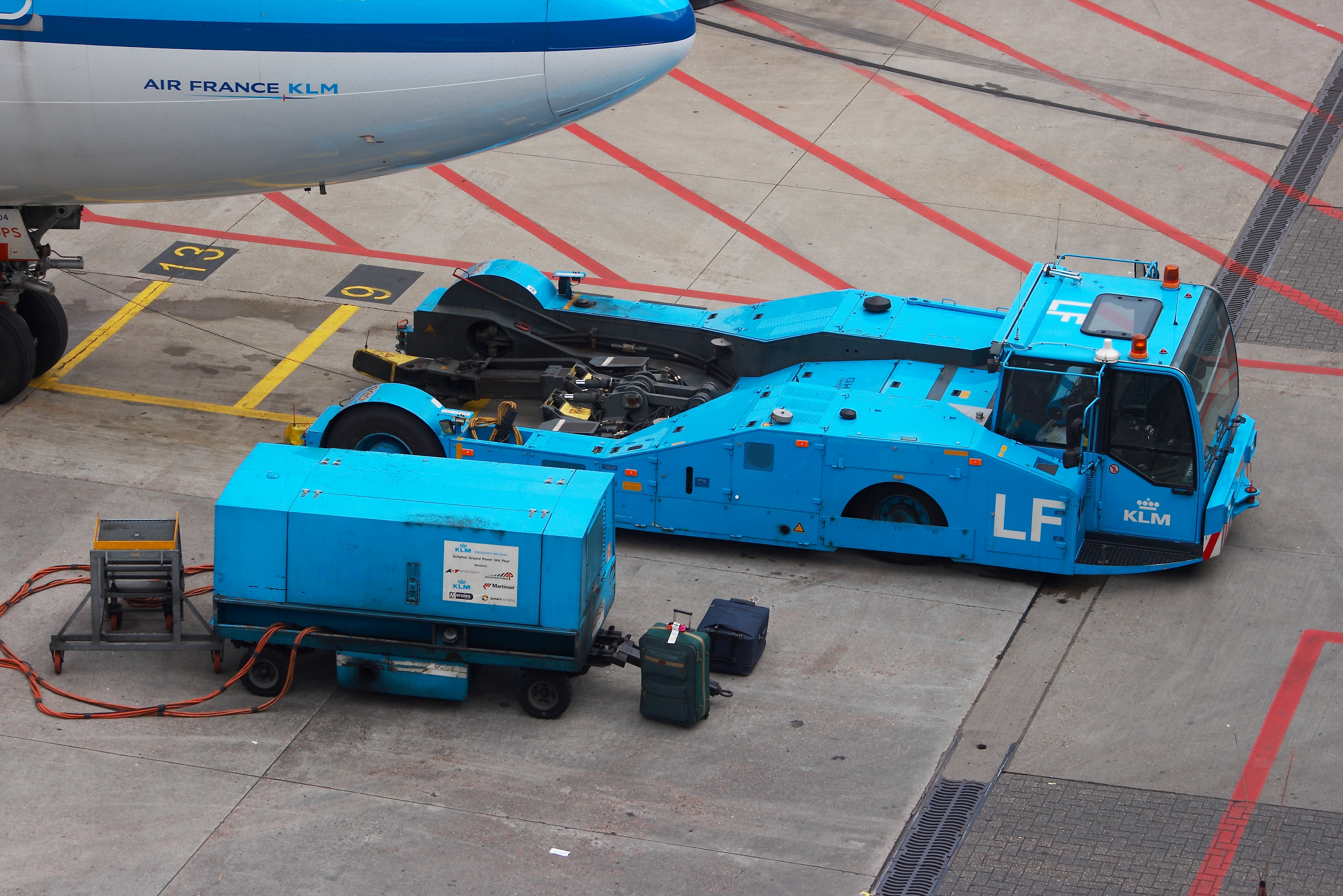
KLM Pushback tractor and a ground power unit

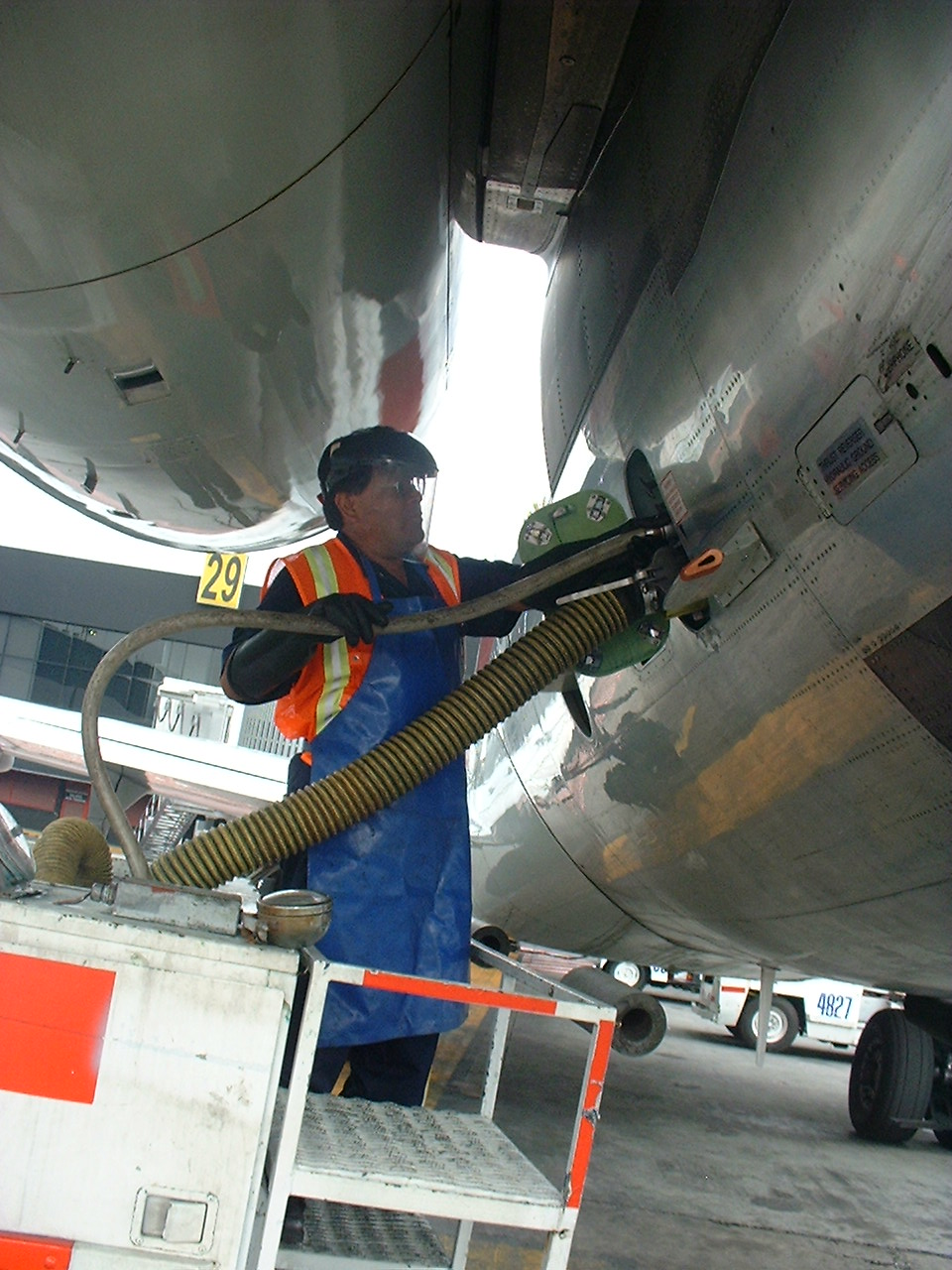
Lavatory drainage

This includes services on the ramp or apron, such as:

- Guiding the aircraft into and out of the parking position (by way of aircraft marshalling),
- Towing with pushback tractors
- Pre-Conditioned Air and Heating
- Airstart units (for starting engines)
- Luggage handling, usually by means of beltloaders and baggage carts
- Gate checked luggage, often handled on the tarmac as passengers disembark
- Air cargo handling, usually by means of cargo dollies and cargo loaders.
- Ground power (so that engines need not be running to provide aircraft power on the ground)
- Passenger stairs (used instead of an aerobridge or airstairs, some budget airlines use both to improve turnaround speed)
- PIGS (Passenger Integrated Guidance System), a retractable barrier, is used to ensure passengers do not walk underneath the wings
- Wheelchair lifts, if required
- Deicing

=== Field operation service ===
This service dispatches the aircraft, maintains communication with the rest of the airline operation at the airport and with Air Traffic Control.

== List of notable handling agents ==
=== Asia ===
==== Bangladesh ====
- Biman Bangladesh Airlines

==== Hong Kong ====
- (Hong Kong) Cathay Pacific
- Hong Kong Airport Services (parent company: Cathay Pacific)
- (Hong Kong) Jardine Aviation Services (parent company: Jardine Matheson)
- SATS HK (parent company: Hong Kong Airlines)
- (Hong Kong) United Airlines

==== Japan ====
- (Japan) All Nippon Airways

==== Nepal ====
- Nepal Airlines – Kathmandu

==== Pakistan ====
- Pakistan International Airlines

==== Singapore ====
- (Singapore) SATS Ltd
- dnata Singapore
- (Singapore) Universal Aviation

==== Philippines ====
- (Philippines) MacroAsia Airport Services Corporation

==== Taiwan ====
- (Taiwan) China Airlines Co., Ltd.
- (Taiwan) Taoyuan International Airport Services Co., Ltd.

=== Europe ===
==== Belgium ====
- (Belgium) Aviapartner

==== Denmark ====
- (Denmark) SAS Ground Handling

==== France ====
- (France) Aviapartner
- (France) Servair

==== Italy ====
- (Italy) Aviapartner

==== Netherlands ====
- (Netherlands) Aviapartner
- (Netherlands) dnata
- (Netherlands) Menzies Aviation
- (Netherlands) Swissport
- (Netherlands) Viggo

==== Norway ====
- (Norway) Menzies Aviation
- (Norway) SAS Ground Handling

==== Portugal ====
- Groundforce Portugal

==== Russia ====
- (Russia) Sheremetyevo Handling
- (Russia) Domodedovo Airport Handling

and others. Usually each airport in Russia has it own ground handling company

==== Sweden ====
- (Sweden) SAS Ground Handling
- (Sweden) Menzies Aviation

==== Switzerland ====
- (Switzerland) Swissport
- (Switzerland) dnata

==== United Kingdom ====
- (United Kingdom) American Airlines Handling (subsidiary of American Airlines)
- (United Kingdom) Blue Handling (joint venture between Ryanair and OmniServ)
- (United Kingdom) British Airways
- (United Kingdom) DHL
- (United Kingdom) Dnata
- (United Kingdom) Gatwick Ground Services (subsidiary of British Airways)
- (United Kingdom) Jet2 Handling
- (United Kingdom) Menzies Aviation
- (United Kingdom) Star Handling
- (United Kingdom) Swissport GB

=== Middle East ===
- (United Arab Emirates) dnata (Also active in other countries)
- (Saudi Arabia) Saudia Cargo
- Oman Air
- (Pakistan) Shaheen Airport Services
- (Israel) El Al

=== North and Central America ===
==== Canada ====
- (Canada) Alliance Ground International (AGI)
- (Canada) Swissport
- (Canada) Menzies Aviation
- (Canada) Executive Aviation
- (Canada) Executive Flight Center
- (Canada) PrimeFlight
- (Canada) Allied Aviation
- Air Canada
- (Canada) Unifi Aviation
- (Canada) Samsic
- (Canada) TSAS

==== Cuba ====
- (Cuba) ECASA

==== Mexico ====
- Kion de Mexico

==== United States ====
- (United States) Alliance Ground International
- (United States) Dnata
- (United States) McGee Air Services
- (United States) Menzies Aviation
- (United States) Swissport
- (United States) Unifi Aviation

=== South America ===
==== Peru ====
- (Peru) Swissport

==== Chile ====
- (Chile) Swissport
- (Chile) Menzies Aviation

=== Oceania ===
==== Australia ====
- (Australia) Swissport
- (Australia) Dnata

== See also ==
- Flight kitchen
- Ground support equipment
