= Marcopolo S.A. =

Brazilian bus and coach manufacturer

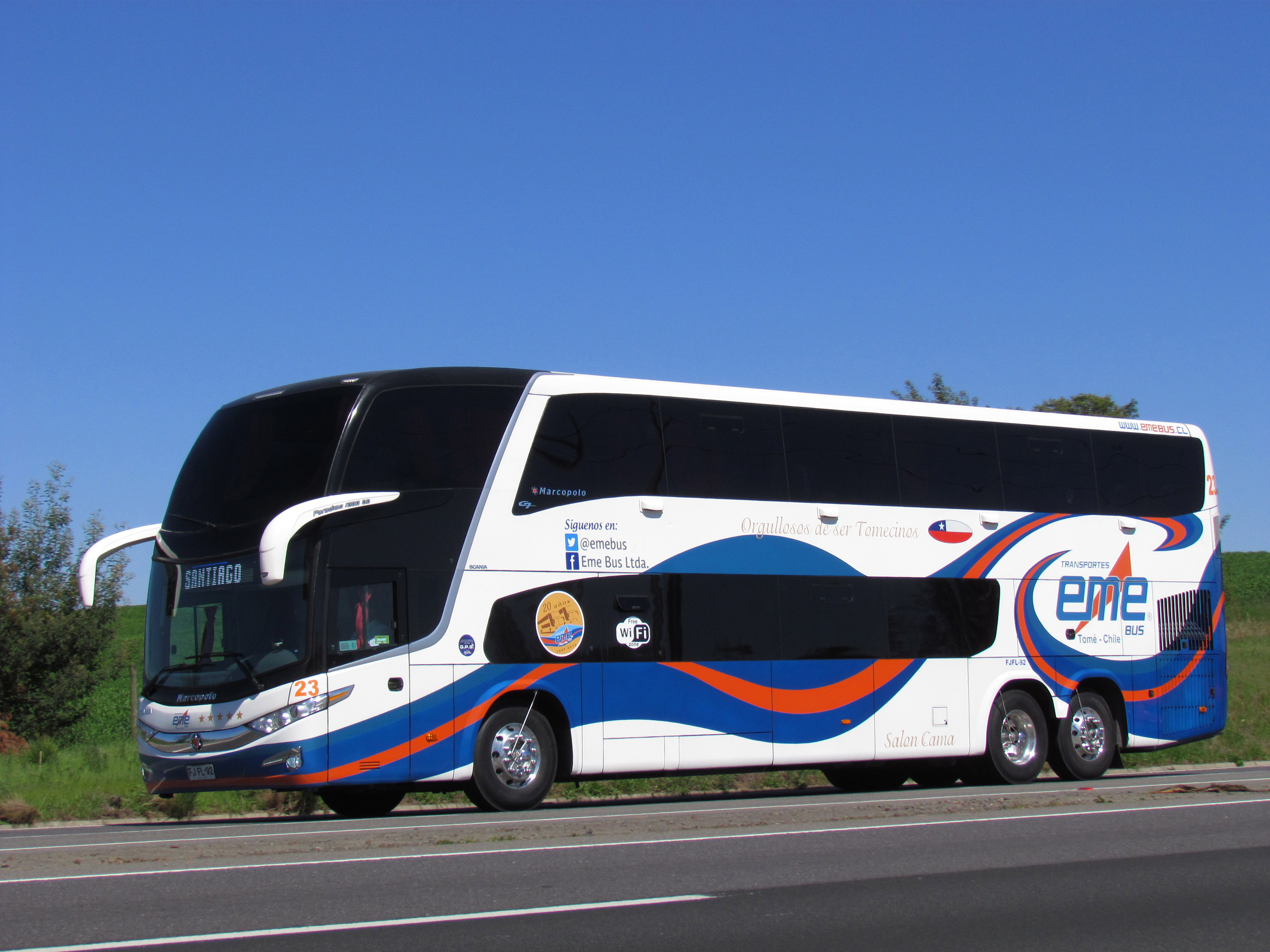
- Type: Public
- Traded as: B3: POMO3, POMO4
- Industry: Automotive
- Founded: 6 August 1949; 77 years ago
- Headquarters: Caxias do Sul, Rio Grande do Sul, Brazil
- Area served: Africa; Asia Pacific; Caribbean; Latin America; Middle East; South Asia; Portugal; Southeast Asia; Spain; Europe (EU)
- Key people: Mauro Bellini (Chairman); André Vidal Armaganijan (CEO)
- Products: Intercity, Urban, Micro and Mini Buses & Rail
- Revenue: ▲US$ 1.62 billion (2024)
- Net income: ▲US$ 226.4 million (2024)
- Number of employees: 20,016
- Subsidiaries: Fundação Marcopolo; Marcopolo Next; Marcopolo Parts; Marcopolo Rail; Moneo; MVC; Neobus; Volare; Volgren; NFI Group (10.8%)
- Website: www.marcopolo.com.br/en

Marcopolo S.A. is a Brazilian bus, coach and rail manufacturer, founded on 6 August 1949 in the southern Brazilian city of Caxias do Sul, state of Rio Grande do Sul. The company manufactures the bodies for a whole range of coaches, e.g. microbus, intercity, and touring models.

It is the largest bus car manufacturer in Latin America and the third worldwide, over half of the bus bodies in Brazil are from the company, and its coaches were exported to 100 countries. They have seven production plants in Brazil, Argentina, China, Mexico, Colombia, Australia and South Africa. Some technology was transferred to India's Tata Motors in form of Tata Marcopolo Motors Ltd.

The world's longest active bus route, the 3,920-mile (6,310 km) Transoceánica, is undertaken with a Marcopolo Viaggio G7 1050.

== History ==
Marcopolo was founded on 6 August 1949 in Caxias do Sul as Nicola & Cia Ltd., production was entirely handmade, a company then having 8 partners and 15 employees. In 1953, Marcopolo starts the production of the first steel structures. In 1971, the company changed name to Marcopolo S.A. Carrocerias e Ônibus (Marcopolo S.A. Body and Bus manufacturer). In 2013, made a joint-venture Urban Buses, a CA$116 million strategic investment, with New Flyer.

== Corporate leadership ==
=== Chairmen ===
- Eight Founders (including Paulo Bellini, Dorval Antonio Mattana, and Valentino Nicola) (1949–1969)
- Paulo Bellini (1969–2012)
- Mauro Bellini (2012–present)

=== Chief executive officers ===
- José Rubens de la Rosa (2000–2015)
- Francisco Gomes Neto (2015–2019)
- James Bellini (2019–2023)
- André Armaganijan (2023–present)

== Brand names ==
- Ciferal - was focused on urban operations, defunct brand
- Marcopolo, Paradiso G8
- Marcopolo Rail
- Volare - dedicated to the development, production and commercialization of the Access, Attack & Fly models of the Ambulance, Fire Department, Easy Access, Mobile Unit sectors, Municipal, Police School bus and Tourism
- Neobus - Thunder & Thunder Midi (Countryside School Buses)
- SUPERPOLO S.A.

== Subsidiaries ==
- MVC - which started its activities operating in the automotive industry and gradually broadened its operations, introducing its plastic products to the light industry and infra-structure markets, etc.
- Moneo - the financial service unit of Marcopolo.
- Volgren - is an Australian bodywork company owned by Marcopolo.
- Isuzu Marcopolo - a Isuzu's Bus division and joint-venture company between Isuzu Philippines Corporation (IPC) and Marcopolo S.A.

== Products ==
=== Buses (include coaches) ===
- Allegro
  - Allegro 1993 (1993–1995)
  - Allegro GV (1996–1998)
  - Allegro 1999 (1999–2007)
- Andare (1998–2000)
- Andare Class (2000–2014)
- Audace (2012–2021)
  - Audace 1050 HK (2013–2020, China)
- Attivi (joint venture with BYD)
  - Attivi Express
  - Attivi Integrale
- Boxer (joint venture with Mercedes-Benz in Mexico)
- Ideale
  - Ideale 770 (2005–2018)
  - Ideale 770 MT (2005–2018)
  - Ideale 800 (2018-Present)
  - Ideale 800 MT (2018-Present)
  - Ideale 600 (2018-Present)
- Listo (only available in Colombia from SUPERPOLO S.A).
- Multego
- Paradiso G7 & G8 series, DD, 1800, 1600, 1350, 1200, 1050, 900
  - GV 1000 (1988–2000)
  - G6 1050 (1998–2011)
- Senior
  - Senior 1983 (1983–1989)
  - Senion 1989 (1989–1995)
  - Senior GV (1995–2000)
  - Senior 2000 (2000–2005)
  - Senior 2005 (2005–2018)
  - Senior 2018 (2018-Present)
  - Senior Rodoviario 2005 (2005–2018)
  - Senior Rodoviario 2018 (2018-Present)
  - Senior Midi 2005 (2005-Present)
- Temple (only available in Colombia from SUPERPOLO S.A).
- Torino
  - Torino (1982–1988)
  - Torino LN (1989–1995)
  - Torino GV (1995–1998)
  - Torino 1999 (1998–2007)
  - Torino 2007 (2007–2016)
  - Torino 2014 (2014-Present)
  - Torino Express (2014–2023)
  - Torino S (2017-Present)
  - Torino G8 (2026-Present; South America and Philippines Debut)
- Viaggio 800 1988(1988–1993 in Brazil)
- Viaggio 800 (2020-present, only for Mexico)
- Viale (1998–2013)
- Gran Viale (called Viale in Brazil)
  - Gran Viale 2004 (2004–2014)
  - Gran Viale LE (2004–2014)
  - Gran Viale Articulado (2004–2014)
  - Viale DD (2004–2014)
  - Viale DD Sunny 2003 (2003-Present)
  - Viale BRT (2012-Present)
  - Viale BRT Articulado (2013-Present)
  - Viale BRT Biarticulado (2013-Present)
  - Viale BRS (2013-Present)
  - Viale DD Sunny 2013 (2013-Present)
  - Viale Express (2023-Present)

=== Rail vehicles ===
- People Movers
- Prosper VLT
- Rail

== Gallery ==
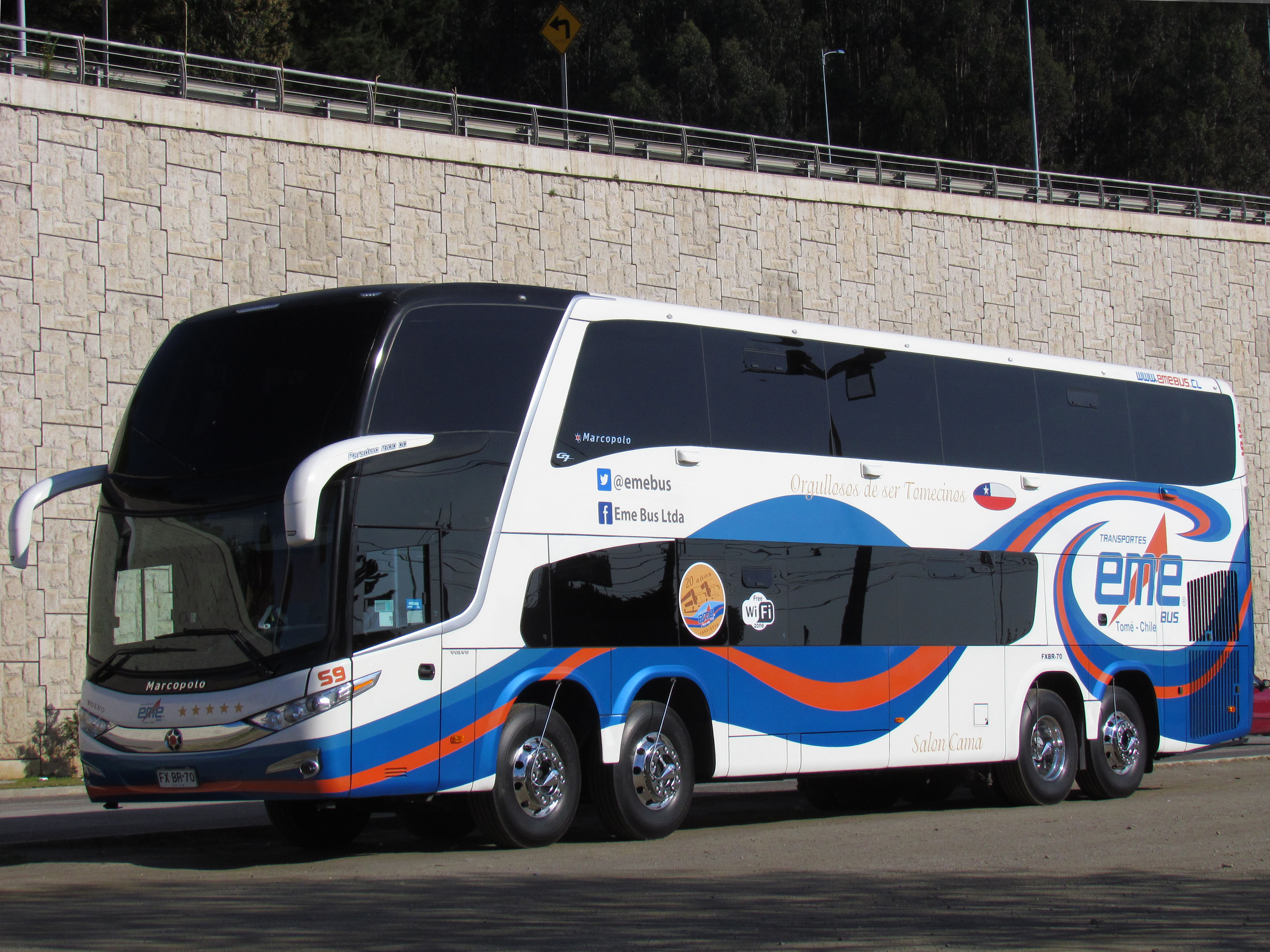
Marcopolo Paradiso G7 1800 DD

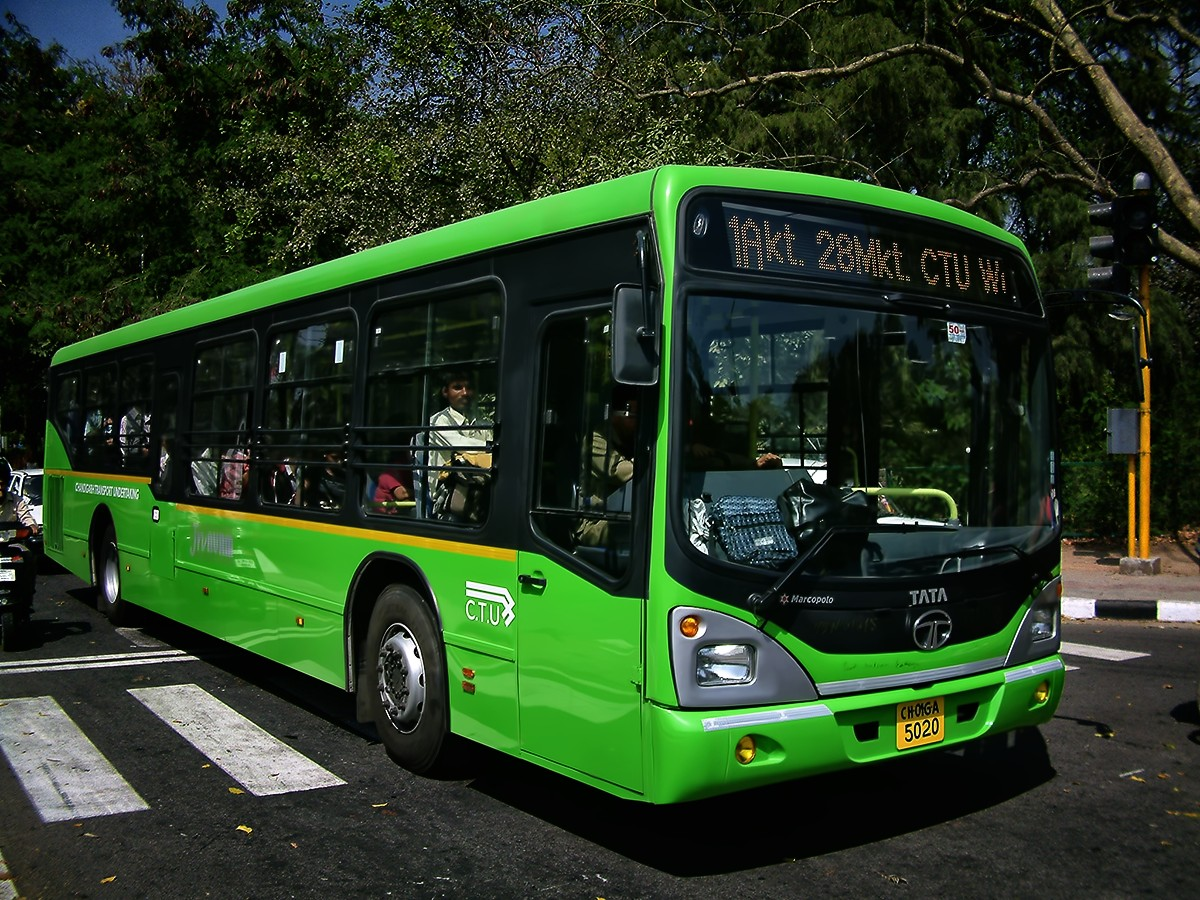
Tata Marcopolo Bus in Chandigarh, India

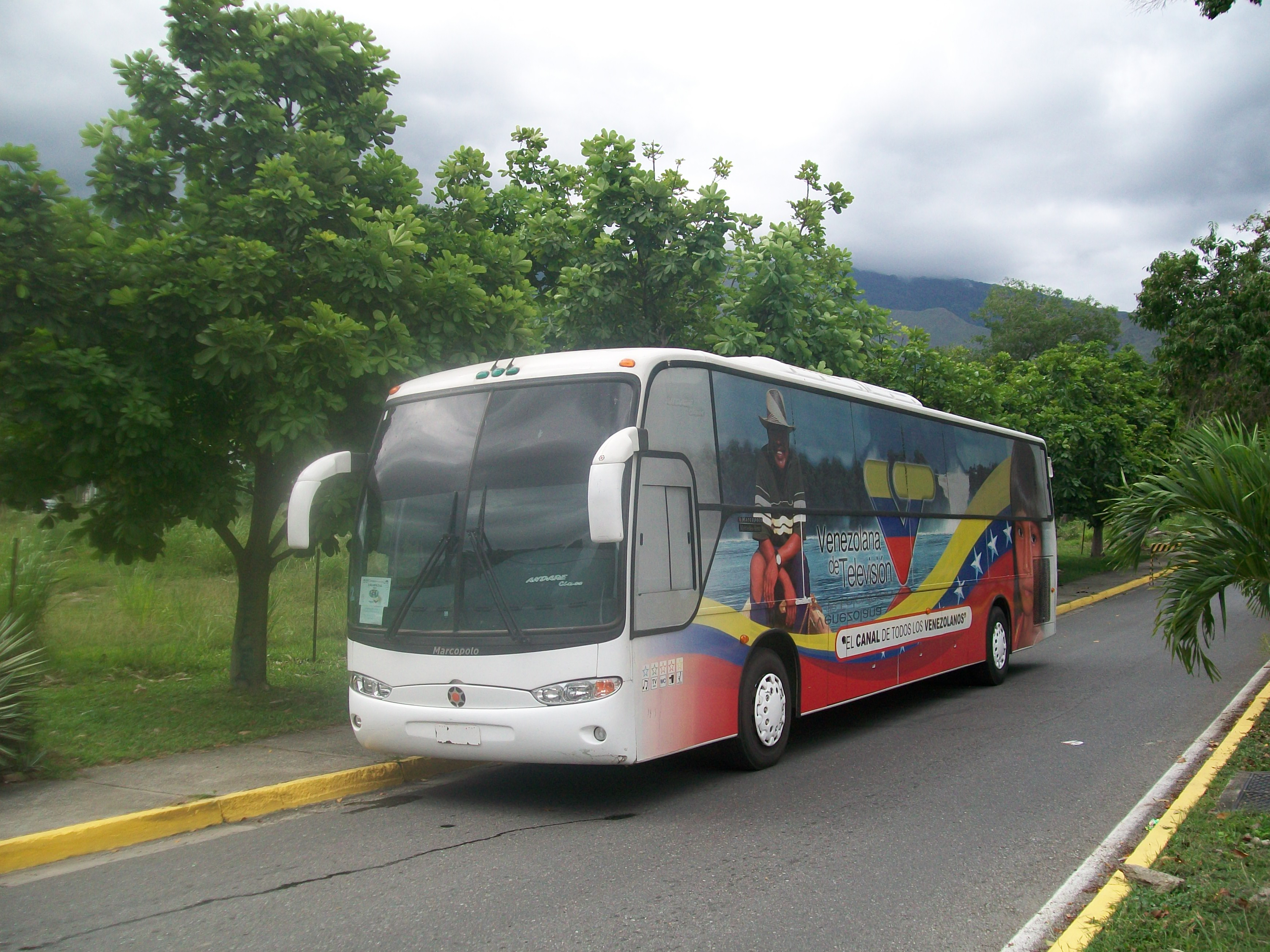
Venezolana de Televisión's owned coach bus parked at the foothills of Henri Pittier National Park in Maracay, Venezuela.

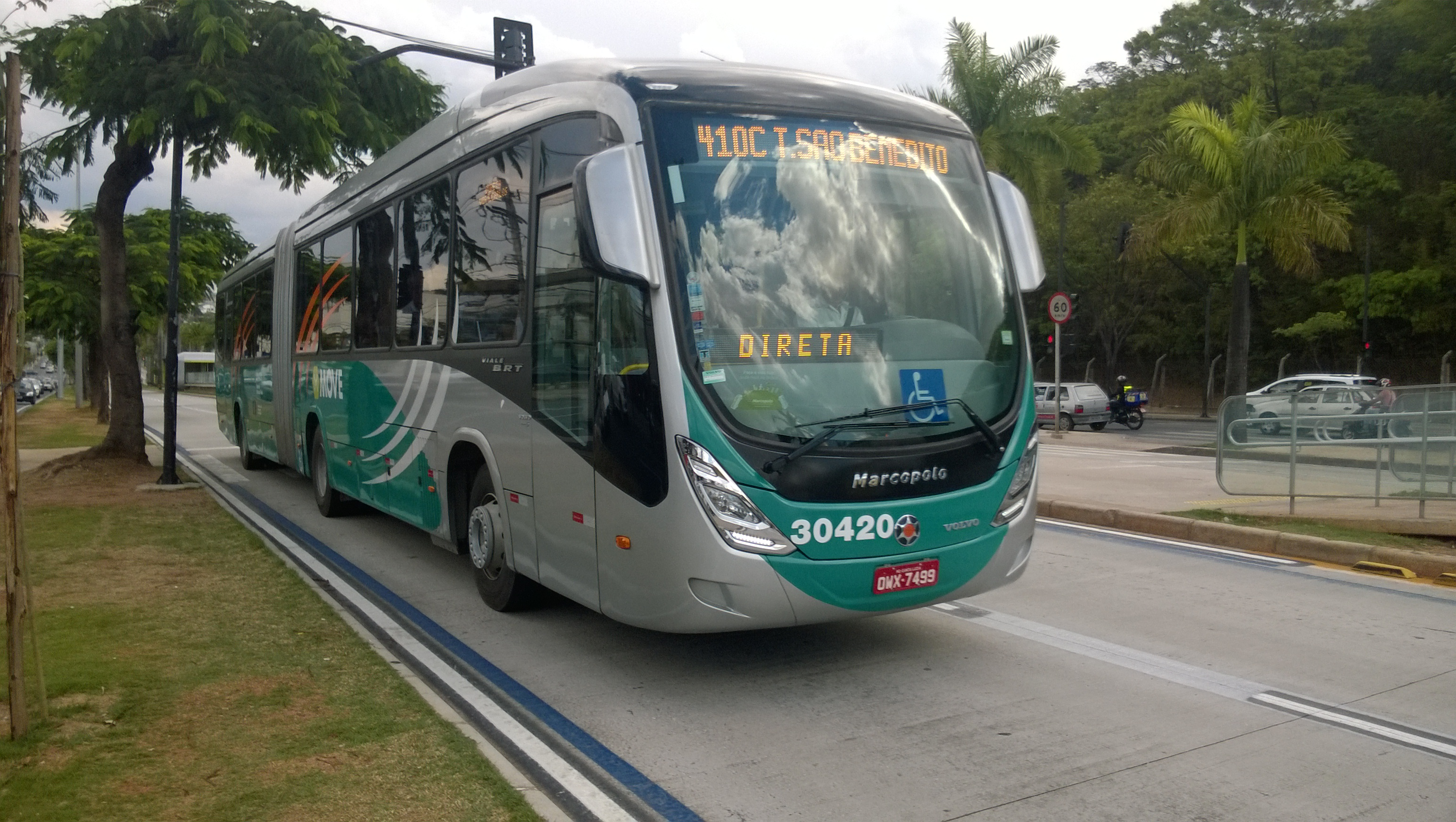
Marcopolo Viale BRT in Belo Horizonte

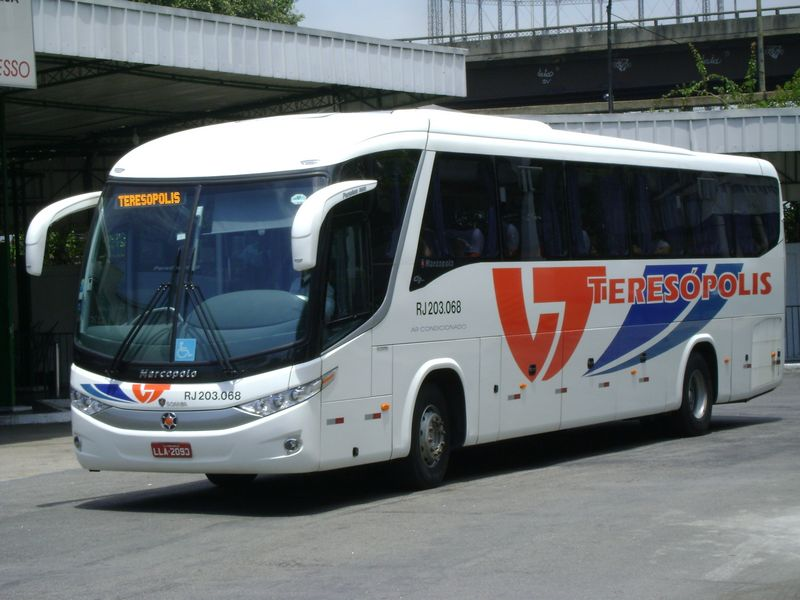
Marcopolo Paradiso G7 1050

Interior of a Marcopolo Unesul company bus

Iguazu Falls National Park Bus by Marcopolo

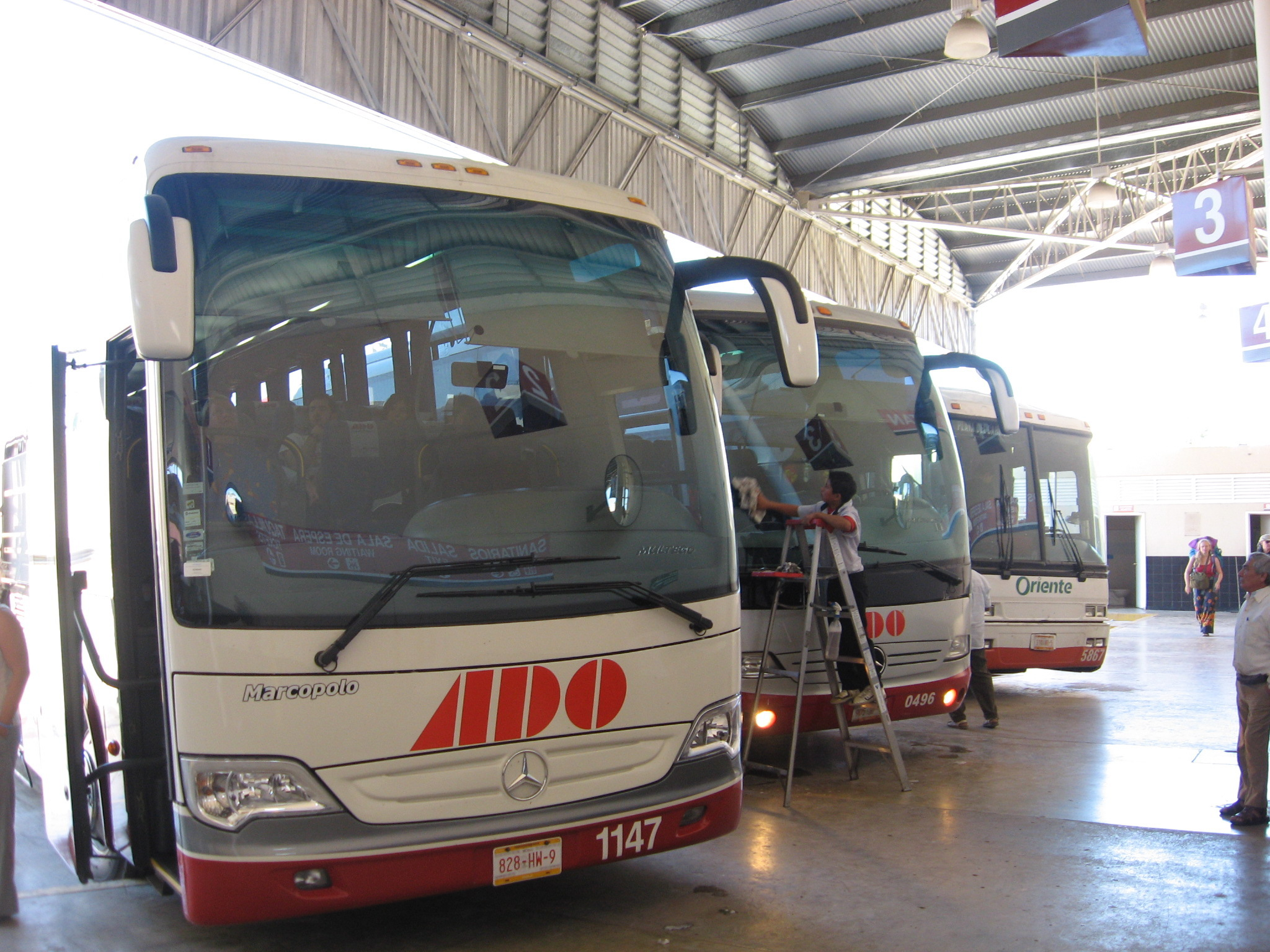
Marcopolo buses in ADO livery at Valladolid, Mexico

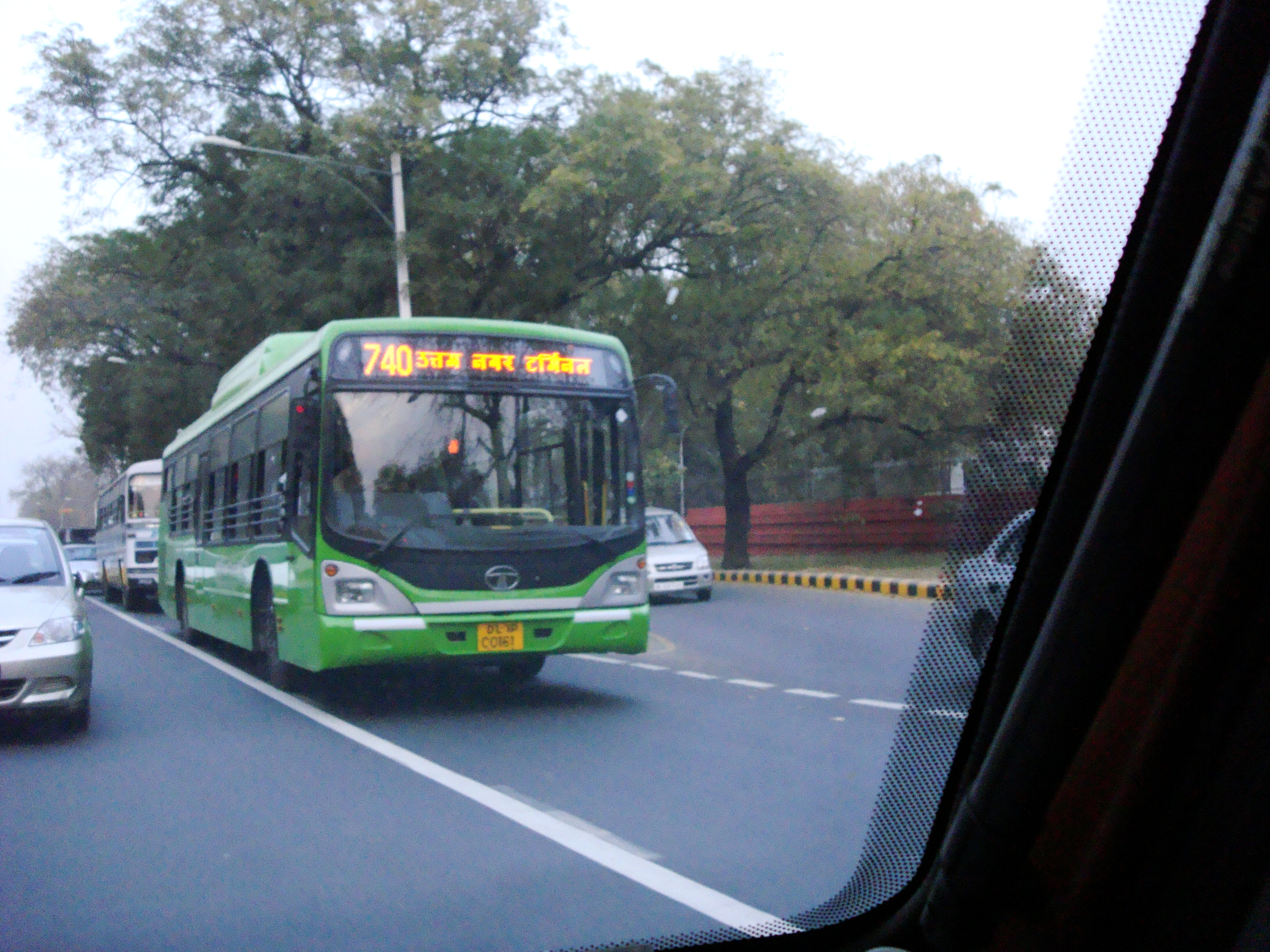
Tata Marcopolo Bus in India

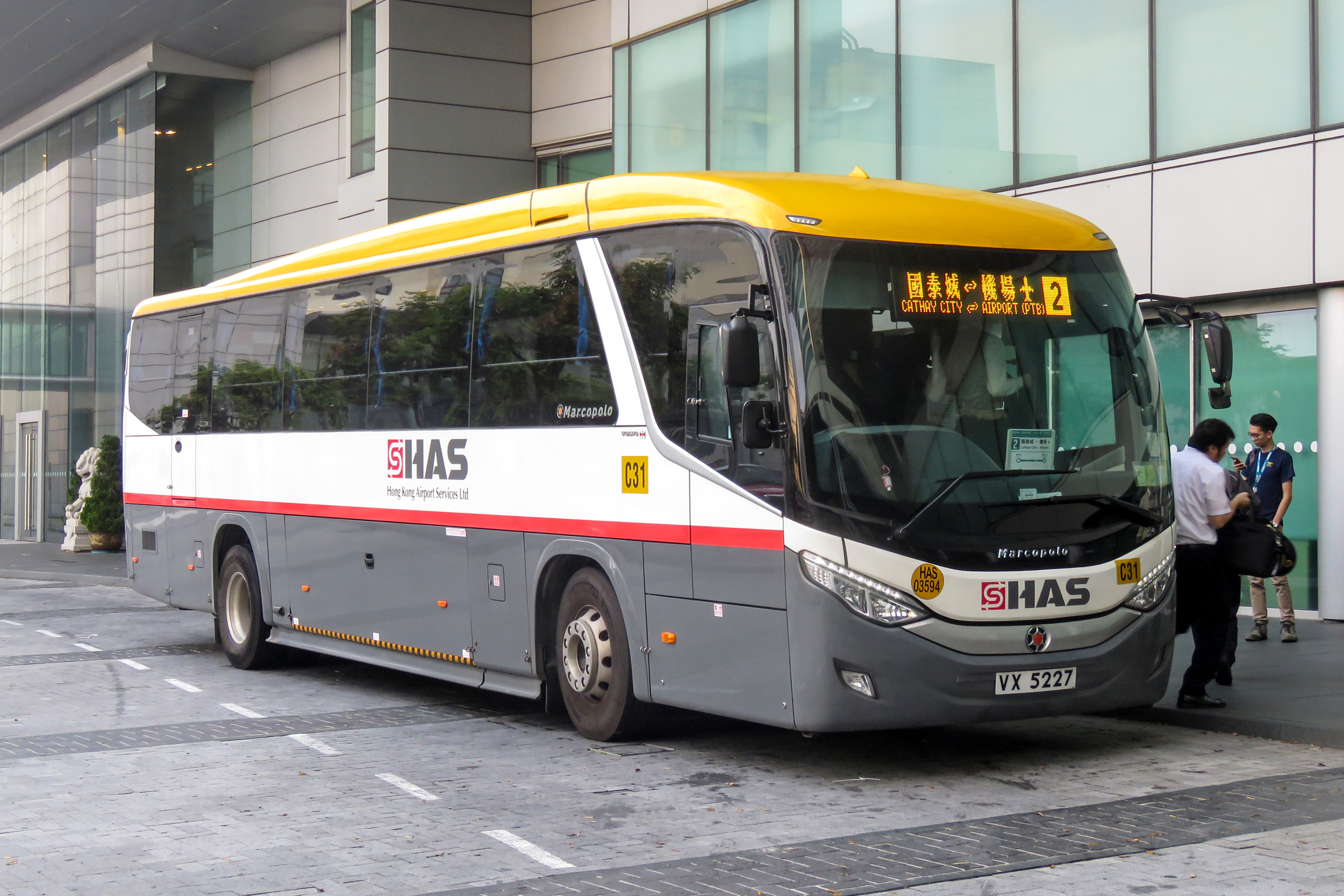
A Volvo B8R with Marcopolo body in Hong Kong

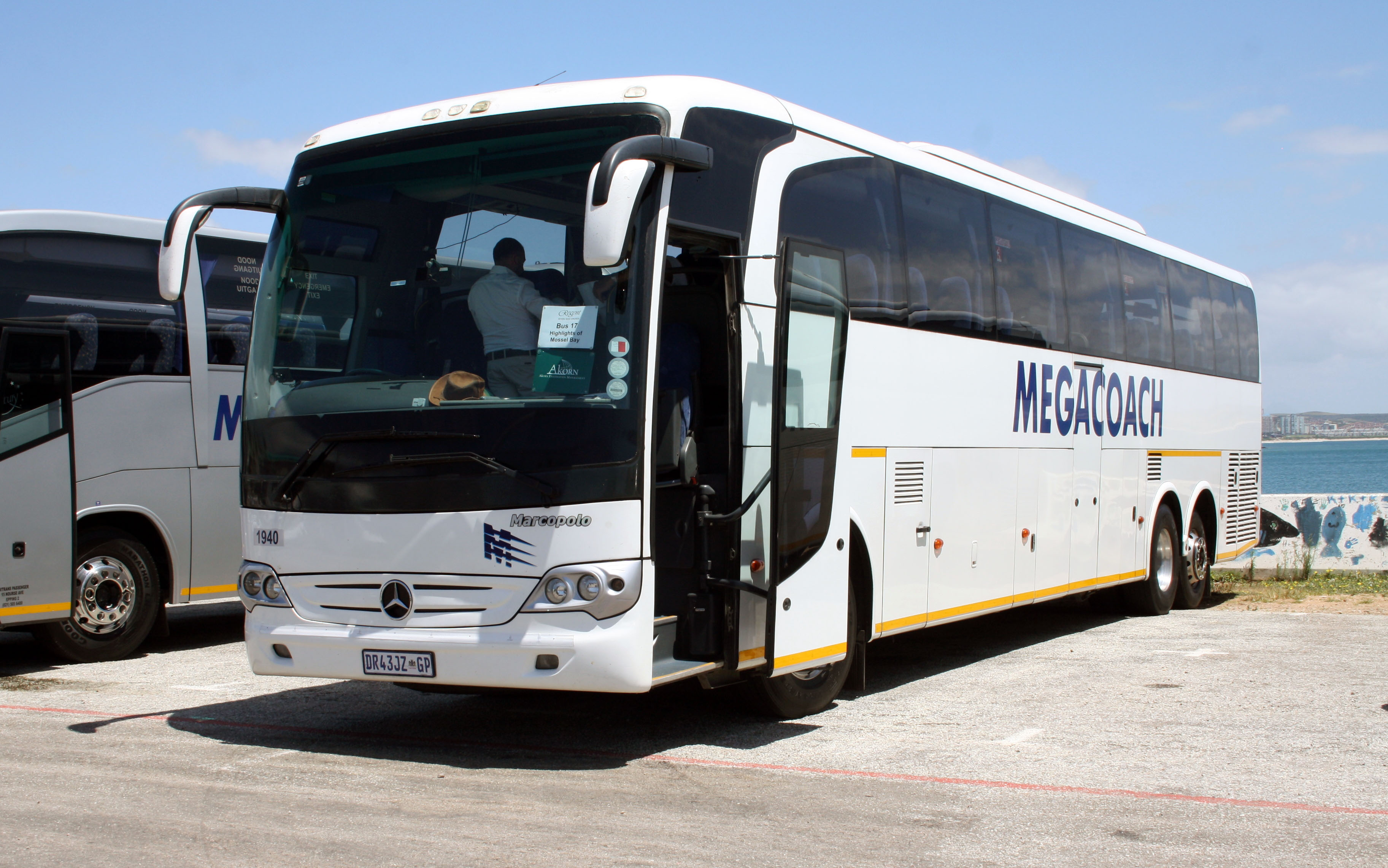
A Marcopolo Mercedes-Benz coach in MegaCoach livery at Mossel Bay Central, Mosselbaai, South Africa

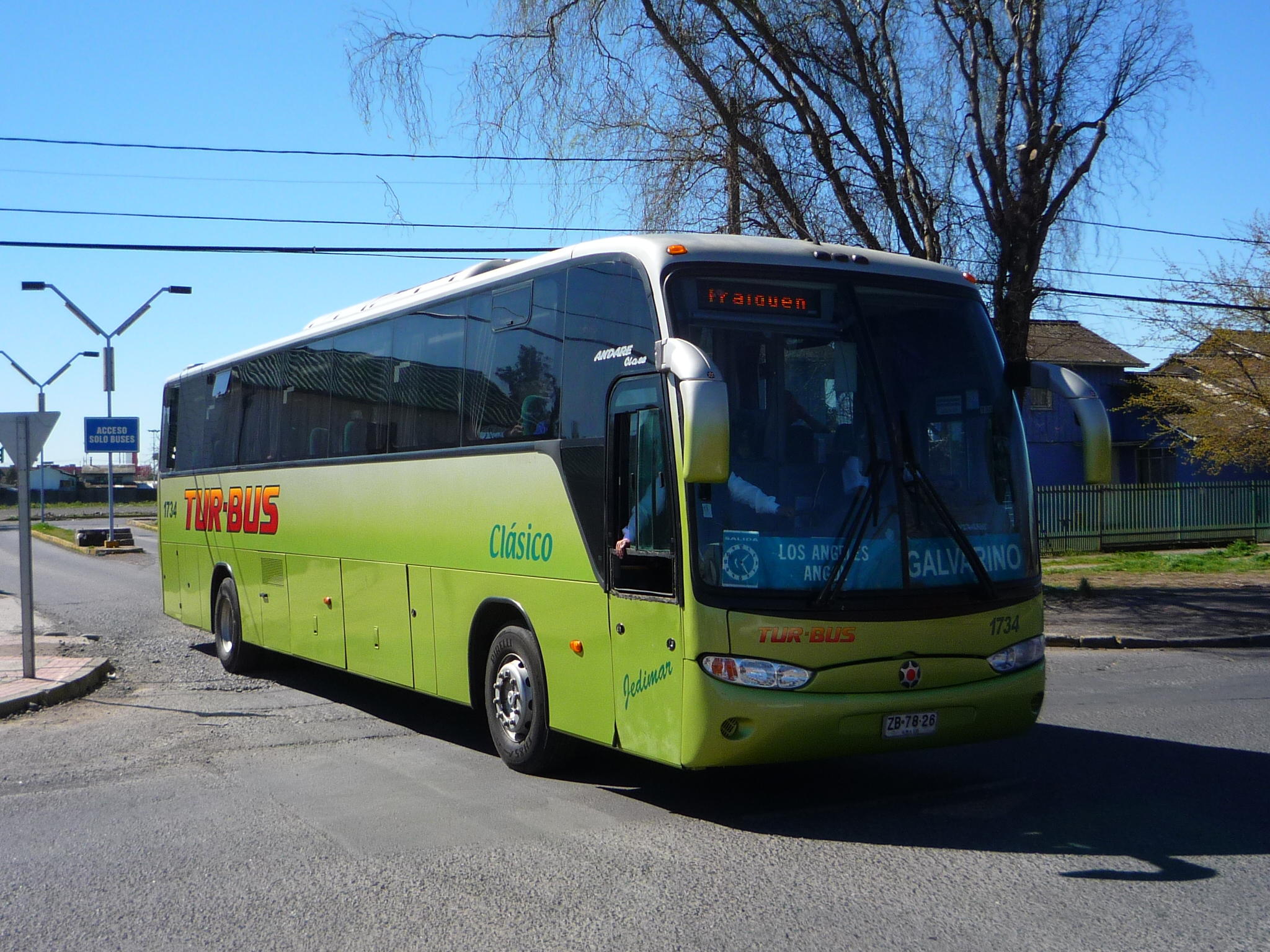
An Marcopolo Andare class bodied Mercedes-Benz OH-1628L operated by Tur-Bus in Chile
