= Aviapartner =

Belgian airport ground handling company

- Industry: Aviation
- Founded: 1949 (as Belgavia)
- Headquarters: Brussels Airport, Belgium
- Key people: Richard Prince, CEO
- Services: Aircraft ground handling Aircraft maintenance
- Website: www.aviapartner.aero

Aviapartner, whose origins date back to 1949 under the name of Herfurth Air Services to become 'Belgavia' in the late 1960s, is a Belgian company that provides ground handling services at 72 airports in Belgium, France, Germany, Italy, Spain, the Netherlands and recently in South Africa (acquired part of South-African handler). Among the airports served are Amsterdam, Brussels, Milan, Düsseldorf, Rome, Nice, Toulouse and Málaga .

== History ==
In 1949, Belgavia was founded in Antwerp, Belgium. In the following years, it expanded their services to the airports of Ostend (1957), Liège (1965) and Brussels (1970). It was not until the 1990s for the company to go international. Bases in France and later in Germany were opened. In 1999, the name was changed to Aviapartner. The group expanded by taking over Servisair in Rotterdam (2002), Aero Groundservices in Amsterdam (2007) and SAT in Bordeaux and La Rochelle (2010).

In 2011, Aviapartner lost its handling licence in Brussels for seven years to Swissport. This raised the prospect of thousands of job losses and led to a major 24-hour strike in June 2011 that affected many flights and passengers. Aviapartner went to court as they believed judicial mistakes had been made. The judge ruled that a new investigation was to be conducted and that, in the meantime, Aviapartner could continue operations at the airport. Before a new investigation was concluded, Swissport took over Flightcare, the other ground handling company at the airport. Note that only two handling licences are issued at the airport.

In 2012, Aviapartner announced a merger with the French Worldwide Flight Services (WFS), which would have created the largest ground handler in Europe. This merge was not successful.

== Range of ground handling services ==
- Passenger handling:

Check-in, ticketing, boarding assistance, lost and found baggage services, assistance to disabled passengers, passenger ground transportation.

- Ramp handling:

Loading and unloading of baggage and cargo to/from aircraft on the ramp, ground power provision for aircraft, cleaning, water and sanitary services, freight and baggage transfer to terminal, crew transfer from aircraft to terminal/hotel, pushback and towing, with headset, aircraft de-icing.

- Traffic operations:

Preparation of flight documentation, ground-to-air communication, calculation of weight and balance, preparation of loadsheets, crew briefing, flight supervision.

- Cargo handling:

Warehousing, palletizing, import and export procedures, customs clearance, trucking services.

- Courier handling:

Transfer of courier and express shipments to/from other warehouses and aircraft, handling of express flights operated from the Brussels Airport Courier Center.

== Airports served by Aviapartner ==
Country	Airport	IATA	ICAO	Passenger Handling	Ramp Handling	Executive Handling	Cargo Handling
Belgium	Brussels (HQ)	BRU	EBBR	●	●	●	●
Belgium	Antwerp	ANR	EBAW	●	●		
Belgium	Liège	LGG	EBLG	●	●	●	●
Belgium	Ostend-Bruges	OST	EBOS	●	●	●	●
France	Bordeaux	BOD	LFBD	●	●	●	
France	La Rochelle	LRH	LFBH	●	●	●	
France	Lille	LIL	LFQQ	●	●	●	
France	Lyon-Saint Exupéry	LYS	LFLL	●	●		
France	Marseille	MRS	LFML	●	●	●	
France	Montpellier	MPL	LFMT	●	●	●	
France	Nantes	NTE	LFRS	●	●	●	
France	Nice	NCE	LFMN	●	●	●	
France	Saint-Nazaire	SNR	LFRZ				●
France	Strasbourg	SXB	LFST	●	●	●	
France	Toulouse	TLS	LFBO	●	●	●	
Germany	Düsseldorf	DUS	EDDL	●	●		
Germany	Hannover	HAJ	EDDV	●	●	●	
Italy	Bologna	BLQ	LIPE	●	●		
Italy	Catania	CTA	LICC	●	●		
Italy	Lamezia	SUF	LICA	●	●	●	
Italy	Milan Linate	LIN	LIML	●	●	●	
Italy	Milan Malpensa	MXP	LIMC	●	●	●	●
Italy	Palermo	PMO	LICJ	●	●	●	
Italy	Reggio di Calabria	REG	LICR	●	●	●	
Italy	Roma Ciampino	CIA	LIRA	●		●	
Italy	Roma Fiumicino	FCO	LIRF	●	●		
Italy	Turin	TRN	LIMF	●	●	●	
Italy	Venice Marco Polo	VCE	LIPZ	●	●	●	
Netherlands	Amsterdam Schiphol	AMS	EHAM	●	●	●	
Netherlands	Rotterdam	RTM	EHRD	●	●		
Spain	Fuerteventura	FUE	GCFV	●	●		
Spain	Girona-Costa Brava	GRO	LEGE	●	●		
Spain	Lanzarote	ACE	GCRR	●	●		
Spain	Málaga	AGP	LEMG	●	●	●	
Spain	Menorca	MAH	LEMH	●	●		
Spain	Sevilla	SVQ	LEZL	●	●		
Spain	Tenerife South	TFS	GCTS	●	●		

=== Corporate Airlines at Amsterdam Airport Schiphol ===
- Aegean Airlines
- Air Transat
- Aer Lingus
- British Airways
- Bulgaria Air
- Croatia Airlines
- Iberia Express
- Scandinavian Airlines
- SkyExpress
- Surinam Airways
- TAP Air Portugal
- Tunisair
- Vueling

=== Corporate Airlines at Brussels Airport ===
- Aegean Airlines
- Aer Lingus
- Air Algerie
- Air Baltic
- Air Canada
- Air Europa
- Air France
- Air Transat
- Air Serbia
- All Nippon Airways
- Austrian Airlines
- British Airways
- Croatia Airlines
- Cyprus Airways
- Dan Air
- EasyJet
- Egyptair
- Ethiopian Airlines
- Etihad Airways
- Finnair
- Flynas
- FlyOne
- Freebird Airlines
- Hainan Airlines
- Iberia
- KLM
- Lufthansa
- Middle East Airlines
- Pegasus Airlines
- Play
- Royal Air Maroc
- Royal Jordanian
- Ryanair
- Scandinavian Airlines
- Singapore Airlines
- Sky Express
- SunExpress
- Swiss
- TAP Portugal
- Thai Airways International
- Transavia
- TUI fly
- Tunisair
- Turkish Airlines
- Ukraine International Airlines
- Vueling

=== Corporate Airlines at Nice Airport ===
- Air Transat
- Austrian Airlines
- Blu-Express
- British Airways
- DHL Aviation
- Europe Airpost
- Finnair
- Iberia
- IGAvion (SkyTaxi)
- Jet2.com
- KLM
- Lufthansa
- Middle East Airlines
- Scandinavian Airlines
- Syphax Airlines
- Brussels Airlines
- TAP Portugal
- Transavia
- Tunisair
- Ukraine International Airlines
- Vueling

== Awards ==
Amsterdam Airport Schiphol presented Aviapartner with 'The Best Handler Award' in 2003, 2007, 2008 and 2009 for its excellent performance in the areas of service, safety and co-operation.

Aviapartner received the IATA Safety Audit for Ground Operations (ISAGO) registration for:

- Amsterdam (December 2008)
- Frankfurt (July 2009)
- Düsseldorf (September 2009)
- Munich (October 2009)
- Brussels (October 2009)
- Milan-Malpensa (November 2009)
- Nice (November 2009)
- Lyon (December 2009)
- Turin (May 2010)
- Venice (June 2010)
- Rotterdam (May 2011)
