= Transat A.T. =

Canadian tour and travel agency

Transat A.T. Inc.

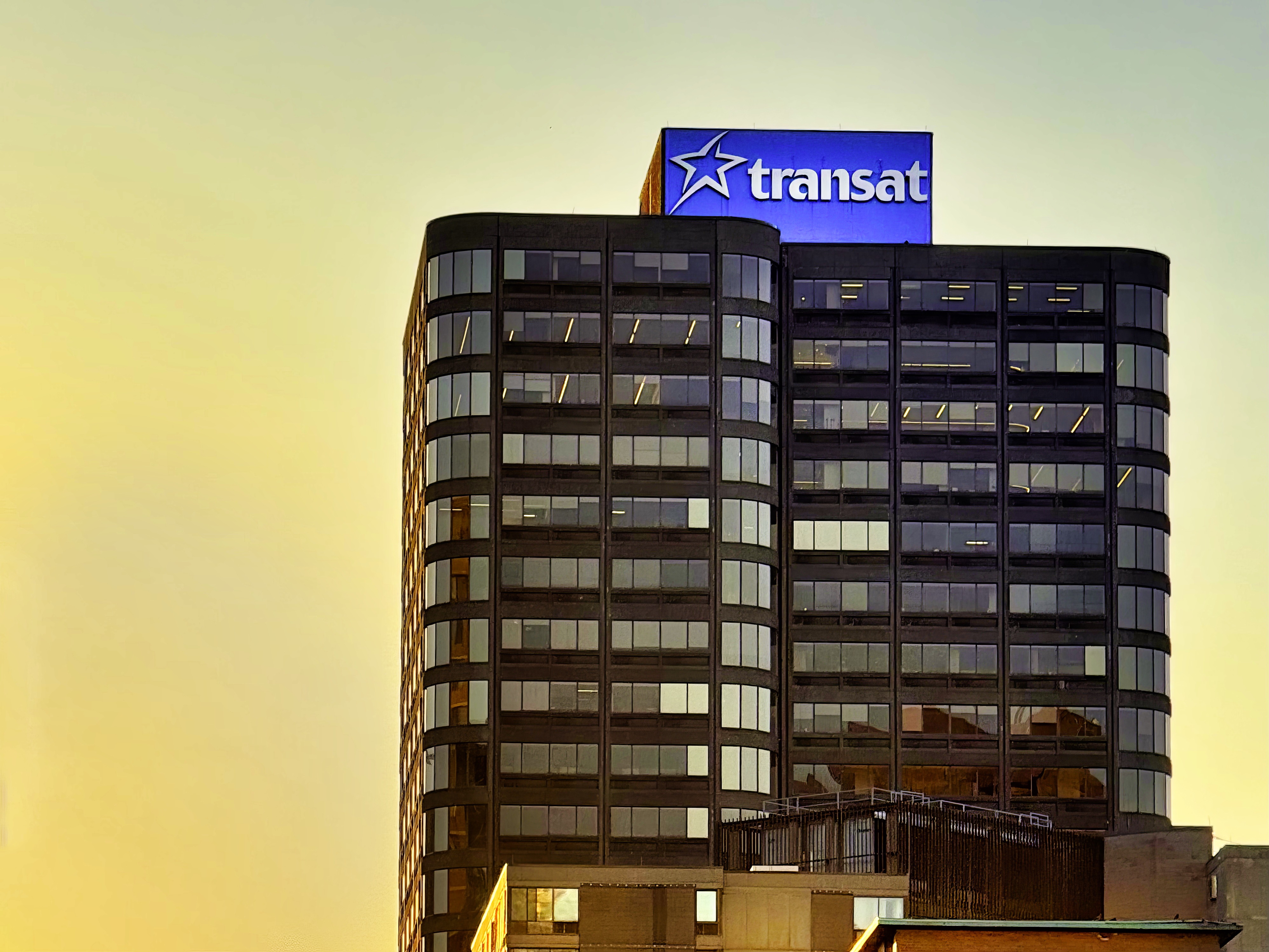
- Headquarters in Montreal
- Type: Public
- Traded as: TSX: TRZ
- Industry: Tour operator
- Founded: Montreal, Quebec (1987)
- Headquarters: Montreal, Quebec
- Key people: Annick Guérard - President and Chief Executive Officer
- Products: Outgoing tour operating, Incoming tour operating and destination services, retail distribution, air transportation, and hotels
- Revenue: $3.5 billion CAD for Fiscal 2009
- Number of employees: 5,000 (2019)
- Website: www.transat.com

Transat A.T. Inc. is an international, vertically integrated tour operator with nearly 20 business units in 8 countries. The company is headquartered in Montreal, Quebec, Canada.

== History ==
Transat was founded in the early 1980s by Jean-Marc Eustache, Lina De Cesare and Philippe Sureau as Trafic Voyages. The company was a wholesaler specializing in travel from Québec to France.

In 1987, the company, which had been renamed Transat, was listed on the stock exchange through an initial public offering that generated $8.25 million. The company used the proceeds to establish its own airline, Air Transat, and to embark into a series of acquisitions in order to solidify its position as an outgoing tour operator in Canada and France, as well as to develop new destination markets.

In 1988, Transat expanded its presence in retail distribution considerably with the acquisition of an interest in the franchisor Consultour.

The company had broken into the French market very early on with Vacances Transat (France), the largest tour operator offering travel to Canada, and soon expanded within France, the United Kingdom and the rest of Europe. It acquired French tour operator Look Voyages in 1996, Greek incoming tour operator Tourgreece in 2001, British tour operator Canadian Affair in 2006, and French tour operator Amplitude Internationale (today Amplitravel), which specializes in travel to Tunisia, in 2007. At its destinations, the company opened offices in Mexico, the Dominican Republic and Florida in order to be able to provide its customers with complementary services. In 2007, Transat created a five hotel, 1,600-room joint venture with the major Spanish chain H10 Hotels in Mexico and the Dominican Republic. In 2010, Transat became an outgoing tour operator in Mexico, when it founded Eleva Travel.

In Canada, Transat has nearly 600 travel agencies more than 5,000 employees and is the largest travel agency network since the acquisition of the Thomas Cook agencies in 2006. Brands include Club Voyages, Voyages en Liberté, Marlin Travel, and TravelPlus.

In 2012, Transat A.T. sold its Handlex business unit, which provides airport ground-handling services at Montreal, Toronto and Vancouver international airports. Handlex was acquired by Servisair Holding Canada Inc, which is now fully integrated to Swissport.

=== Attempted acquisition by Air Canada ===
On 16 May 2019, Transat AT Inc. announced it was in exclusive talks for 30 days with Air Canada which intended to purchase the company. An offer was subsequently made by Air Canada at C$13 per share and another company, Group Mach, proposed a purchase at C$14.

On 27 June 2019, the Board of Transat AT accepted Air Canada's all-cash bid of C$520 million and did not comment on the C$527.6 proposal from Group Mach because the talks with Air Canada were still exclusive. The deal required approval by two-thirds of shareholders; some major investors, and some financial analysts, stated that the offer is below the true value of the company. Regulatory and governmental approval would be required for sale of Transat AT. A May report by CBC News stated that "regulatory approvals are no sure thing". If the Air Canada purchase is concluded, Air Transat would continue to operate as a separate brand.

In late August 2019, 94.77% of shareholders voted in favour of accepting Air Canada's final offer of $18-per-share, a $720 million deal. The plan was "expected to face intense scrutiny from the Competition Bureau and other regulatory authorities, including in Europe", according to CBC News.

In October 2020, the sale price for Transat AT was reduced from C$18 to C$5 per share. The closing of the deal is expected for early 2021. In February 2021, the federal government has approved the 190 million deal (or $5/share). The impact of the COVID-19 pandemic prompted a revision of the deal as well as a decision factor for the Canadian government to approve the merger.

This proposed acquisition by Air Canada has been terminated upon mutual agreement on 2 April 2021, after having been advised by the European Commission that it would not approve the transaction.

== Business operations ==
In May 2021, Jean-Marc Eustache, then CEO and one of the principal founders of the company, announced he would retire, with Annick Guerard (previously COO) becoming president and CEO effective 27 May 2021.

Transat A.T., through its business units, is active in five business segments:

- Air transportation
  - Air Transat
- Outgoing tour operators
  - Transat Holidays - Canada
  - Serviceair - Canada
  - Handlex (now part of Swissport) - Canada
  - Transat Découvertes - Canada
  - Canadian Affair - Europe
  - ACE - Air Consultants Europe - Europe
  - Vacances Transat France - Europe
  - Look Voyages - Europe
  - Amplitravel - Europe
  - Bennett Voyages - Europe
  - Brokair - Europe
  - Eleva Travel - Mexico
- Retail distribution
  - Club Voyages - Canada & Europe
  - Marlin Travel - Canada
  - Transat Travel - Canada
  - Travel Plus - Canada
  - Voyages en Liberté - Canada
- Incoming tour operators and destination services
  - Transat Holidays USA - United States
  - Tourgreece - Europe
  - Trafic Tours - Mexico
  - Turissimo - Dominican Republic
- Hotels
  - Rancho Banderas All-Suites Resort - Mexico

== See also ==
- List of airlines of Canada
- Tourism in Canada
