= Canadian Affair =

Travel and holiday companies of the United Kingdom

IATA	ICAO	Call sign
91253746	CDN	AIR TRANSAT (Air Transat), WESTJET (West Jet)
- Founded: 1995
- Hubs: Gatwick; Glasgow
- Destinations: Toronto; Montreal; Calgary; Vancouver; Quebec
- Parent company: Transat A.T.
- Headquarters: London, England
- Key people: Chris Hedley – Managing Director; Tom Cook - Finance Director; Lee Rogers - Product & Commercial Director
- Website: www.canadianaffair.com

Canadian Affair is the UK's largest tour operator to Canada, providing services including scheduled passenger airlines, package holidays, cruise lines, hotels, motorhome hire and car hire. Since it was founded in 1995, Canadian Affair has flown over one million passengers to Canada.

The company specialises in package and tailor-made travel to both Canada and Alaska, including rail tours, cruises, fly drives, escorted tours, wildlife holidays, ski holidays and activity holidays. In 2017, Canadian Affair won the British Travel Awards Gold Award for Best Holiday Company to Canada (Large) as well as the Silver Award for Best Rail Holiday Company (Large).

The company is based in the UK, and employs approximately seventy people in two offices located in London (Head Office) and Glasgow.

== Ownership ==
On 14 July 2006, Canadian Affair was acquired by Transat A.T. for £20.4 million (approximately C$42.8 million). The deal enabled Transat's airline Air Transat to fly Canadian Affair passengers, thereby securing seat sales for its flights to Canada. The agreement was made between Transat A.T. and the Airline Seat Company, which trades as Canadian Affair.

=== Transat A.T. ===
Transat A.T. is an international tour operator and holiday travel specialist based in Montreal. The company offers vacation packages, hotel stays and air travel to some 60 destinations in 26 countries in the Americas, Europe and the Middle East. Transat operates mainly in Canada, Europe, the Caribbean, Mexico and the Mediterranean Basin. Transat is also active in air transportation, destination services and distribution.

== Key people ==
Canadian Affair approximately 70 staff in London and Glasgow. Some of its key people include:

- Chris Hedley - Managing Director
- Lee Rogers - Product & Commercial Director
- Tom Cook - Finance Director

== Operations ==
Canadian Affair offers flights from London, Manchester and Glasgow (United Kingdom), as well as Dublin, to Toronto, Montreal, Calgary and Vancouver through its flights with Air Transat.

The company also offers hotel accommodation, Avis car hire, Rocky Mountaineer train tours, self-drive holidays, Holland America Line and Celebrity cruises, motorhome hire with Fraserway, CanaDream and Cruise Canada, and escorted coach tours across Canada and Alaska.

== Awards ==
Canadian Affair has been recognised with several awards over the past decade, including the Consumer Favourite Tour Operator Award, which it has won for the past five years at the British Annual Canada Travel Awards.

Other awards include:

- 2018 - British Travel Awards - Best Holiday Company to Canada
- 2018 - British Travel Awards - Best Rail Holidays Company
- 2017 - British Travel Awards - Best Holiday Company to Canada
- 2017 - British Travel Awards - Best Rail Holidays Company
- 2016 - British Travel Awards - Best Holiday Company to Canada
- 2016 - British Travel Awards - Best Rail Holidays Company
- 2015 - British Annual Canada Travel Awards - Best Canadian Ski Tour Operator
- 2015 - British Travel Awards - Best Holiday Company to Canada
- 2015 - British Travel Awards - Silver Award for Best Rail Holidays Company
- 2015 - Travolution Awards - Best Website User Experience
- 2014 - British Travel Awards - Silver Award for Best Holiday Company to Canada
- 2013 - BACTA Explorer Award
- 2012 - CIMTIG Best Travel TV Advert - Canadian Affair is top of the Most Popular TV Advert of the Year poll launched by Chartered Institute of Marketing (CIMTIG)
- 2011 - Best Tour Operator to Canada
- 2010 - Best Tour Operator to Canada
- 2009 - Consumer Favourite Tour Operator
- 2009 - Consumer Favourite Ski Operator
- 2008 - Consumer Favourite Tour Operator
- 2008 - Consumer Favourite Ski Operator
- 2007 - Consumer Favourite Tour Operator
- 2007 - Outstanding Contribution to the Promotion of Canada
- 2006 - Tourism Contribution to the province of Alberta
- 2005 - Best Direct Sale Tour Operator
- 2004 - Best Direct Sale Tour Operator
- 2003 - Best Canada Website
- 2002 - Best Canada Website

== Sponsorship ==
Since 2006, Canadian Affair has sponsored Canada Day in London. Each year Canada Day is celebrated at Trafalgar Square, where live Canadian acts, food stalls, and day-long celebrations take place.

Since 2017, parent company Transat has sponsored the Toronto Wolfpack Rugby League team, which Canadian Affair supports by providing flight, hotel and match ticket packages for Toronto Wolfpack and UK opposition supporters.

Transat also has a partnership with SOS Children's Villages which Canadian Affair supports each year through their Big Hearts fundraising initiative.
