= Hong Kong Airport Services =

Hong Kong Airport Services Limited 香港機場地勤服務有限公司
- Type: Private
- Industry: Ground handling
- Founded: 1995
- Headquarters: Cathay House, Hong Kong
- Area served: Hong Kong
- Key people: Agatha Lee (Chief Executive Officer) Maggie Wong (Chief Operating Officer)
- Services: Airport Ground Handling; Check-in services; Turnaround Ramp Coordination; Cargo Handling; Baggage Handling; Aerobridge
- Number of employees: over 3000
- Parent: Cathay Pacific
- Website: has.com.hk

Hong Kong Airport Services
- Traditional Chinese: 香港機場地勤服務有限公司
- Simplified Chinese: 香港机场地勤服务有限公司
Transcriptions
Standard Mandarin
- Hanyu Pinyin: Xiānggǎng Jīchǎng Dìqín Fúwù Yǒuxiàngōngsī
Yue: Cantonese
- Jyutping: hoeng1 gong2 gei1 coeng4 dei6 kan4 fuk6 mou6 jau5 haan6 gung1 si1

Hong Kong Airport Services Limited (HAS by Cathay) was founded in 1995 and began operations in July 1998 with the opening of Hong Kong International Airport. It employs approximately 3,100 people and owns 3,000 ground-support equipment and vehicles. It is owned by Cathay Pacific, with offices located at Cathay City, Cathay House, Passenger Terminal Building and Cathay Pacific Cargo Terminal.

The company provides ground handling services to airline customers, which include loading and unloading of aircraft, baggage handling, cargo and mail delivery, ramp coordination, aircraft-load control, jet bridge and passenger steps operation, unit load device storage and crew transportation.

The company also handles passenger and flight-handling services such as check-in, ticketing, flight dispatch, and cargo documentation. It provides passenger handling for 19 airlines and ramp and cargo services for 24 airlines, servicing major local carrier Cathay Pacific Airways. In 2016, the company had a market share of 19.73% in passenger handling services and 46.94% in ramp handling services at Hong Kong International Airport. It is a member of the International Air Transport Association ground handling council.

== History ==
=== Early beginning: 1995–2000 ===
In 1995, Hong Kong Airport Services was founded as a joint venture between Cathay Pacific and Cathay Dragon to serve the newly built Hong Kong International Airport in Chek Lap Kok and provide ramp and cargo services to airlines operating in Hong Kong.

The new company effectively replaced in this role the earlier Hong Kong Air Terminal Services, a 34-year-old Jardine Matheson / Swire Pacific joint venture that had served the same functions at Kai Tak Airport since 1961.

Hong Kong Airport Services won the franchise rights for aircraft ramp handling services in 1996 and rights for air side crew transportation services followed in 1997. In 1998, it commenced services in the new Hong Kong International Airport. With no remaining franchise, Hongkong Air Terminal Services ceased business alongside the old airport and was eventually wound up in mid-2009.

=== Development and overseas expansion ===
On November 1st 2008, the company integrated services with Dragonair's ground handling company Hong Kong International Airport Services, soon after Cathay Pacific fully acquired Dragon Air.

On December 1st 2008, Cathay Pacific agreed to take the remaining stake of Hong Kong Airport Services, and it became a wholly owned subsidiary. Since the acquisition, employees of Hong Kong Airport Services represented Cathay Dragon for the ground handling part.

In March 2012, Hong Kong Airport Services established a joint venture company, Shanghai International Airport Services Company, with Shanghai International Airport Company Limited, Air China, and Shanghai Airport Services to provide services in both Shanghai Pudong International Airport and Hongqiao Airport.

In late 2018, the company integrated its services with Cathay Pacific ground services and is now representing Cathay Pacific in ground services.

== See also ==
- Airport Authority Hong Kong
- Cathay City
- Air China
- Chek Lap Kok International Airport
- Shanghai Pudong International Airport
- Hongqiao Airport
