= Volare (Brazil) =

Brazilian bus manufacturer

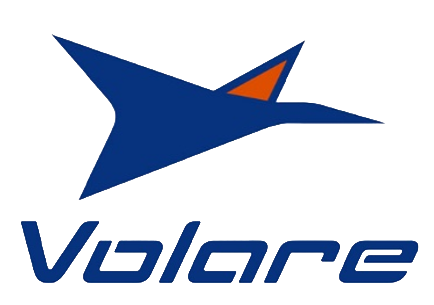
- Logo since 2017
- Industry: Automotive
- Founded: 1998
- Headquarters: Caxias do Sul, Rio Grande do Sul, Brazil
- Area served: Worldwide
- Products: Minibus
- Number of employees: 1,485 (2011)
- Parent: Marcopolo S.A.
- Subsidiaries: Volare Veículos Ltda.
- Website: volare.com.br

Volare is a business unit focused on minibuses, belonging to Marcopolo S.A. It is headquartered in Caxias do Sul, in the state of Rio Grande do Sul.

== Origin ==
The Volare product line was born in 1998, its embryo being the Marcopolo Volare, which was then a simple microbus model from Marcopolo. Aiming to expand this type of product, Marcopolo then transformed the project into a product line specifically designed for micro and minibuses.

== Trajectory ==
Since its launch, Volare has made several releases using variations in configurations for minibuses, such as vehicles prepared for ambulances, firefighters, among others.

The company sells vehicles with a chassis coupled to the body, these chassis being manufactured especially for it by Agrale. In addition to Agrale, Volare also uses chassis from the W9, DW9, and DW9 Fly models, manufactured by Mercedes-Benz. Furthermore, Volare also used chassis manufactured by Iveco, in the A6 model.

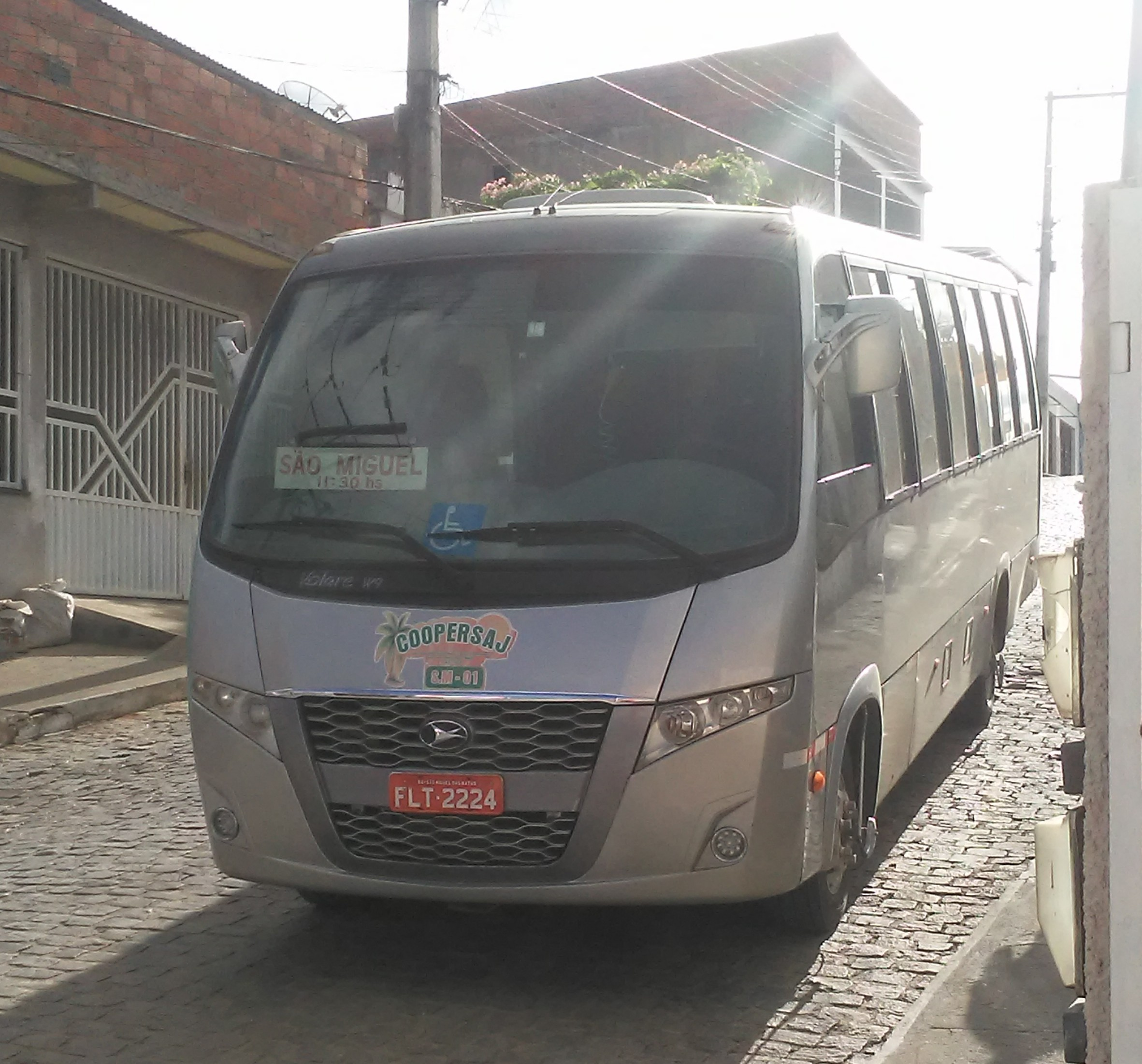
Volare W9 of the Coopersaj company with prefix SM-01 in São Miguel das Matas, Bahia.

In 2016, the company launched its first van-configured vehicle, the Volare Cinco.

== Product Line ==
=== Current Models ===
Urban and school buses

- 4x4 (2008 - present)
- Attack 8 (2018 - present)
- Attack 9 (2018 - present)
- Attack 10 (2018 - present)
- Fly 9 (2018 - present)
- Fly 10 (2018 - present)
- Fly 12 (2024 - present)
- Attack Hybrid (2025 - present)
- Access (2015 - present)
- Electric (2017 - present)
- Discontinued Models

D.W. Series

- DW9 (2010 - 2021)
- DW9 Fly (2011 - 2021)

V Series

- V5 (2005 - 2014)
- V6 (2005 - 2014)
- V6L (2005 - 2014)
- V8 (2005 - 2014)
- V8L (2008 - 2014)
- V9L (2015 - 2018)

W Series

- W6 (2013 - 2018)
- W7 (2013 - 2018)
- W8 (2003 - 2018)
- W8 Fly (2011 - 2018)
- W8C (2015 - 2019)
- W9 (2005 - 2018)
- W9C (2016 - 2019)
- W9 Fly (2011 - 2016)
- W9 Fly Limousine (2011 - 2016)
- W9 Fly Visione (2012 - 2016)
- W12 (2009 - 2016)
- W-L (2012 - 2016)

=== Van ===
- Cinco (2016 - 2022)

=== Discontinued ===
- A5 (1998 - 2002)
- A6 (1999 - 2005)
- A8 (2000 - 2010)
