= Provisioning (cruise ship) =

Providing Food On To An Passenger Ship Especially Cruise Liners

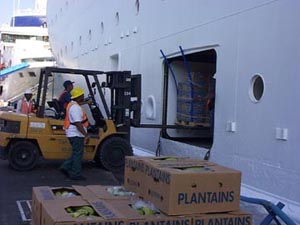
Workers load a cruise ship in Charlotte Amalie, United States Virgin Islands

Provisioning refers to the supplying of food and drink for the passengers of a cruise ship.

As cruise ships consume large amounts of food every day, this operation can be complex, particularly when the chef has promised ambitious menus. Some cruise ship owners contract food service companies to handle all aspects of catering, including the purchase, delivery, and storage of food supplies, menu planning, and hiring and supervision of kitchen staff.

Not all the food will be consumed during the voyage, and the ship must keep a percentage in reserve to allow for delays.
