= Swissport =

Swiss aviation services company

Swissport International Ltd.
- Industry: Aviation
- Founded: 1996; 30 years ago
- Headquarters: Zürich, Switzerland
- Number of locations: 296 airports
- Area served: Worldwide
- Key people: Warwick Brady (President & CEO)
- Services: Ground handling; Cargo services; Executive aviation; Aircraft maintenance; Aviation security; Travel services; Aircraft cleaning
- Revenue: €2.99 billion (2018)
- Number of employees: Around 57,000
- Website: www.swissport.com

Swissport International Ltd. is a Swiss aviation services company providing airport ground handling, lounge hospitality and cargo handling services. Its headquarters are located in Zürich, Switzerland.

In 2022, Swissport handled around 186 million passengers, 4.8 million tonnes of cargo, and over 3 million flights, on behalf of over 850 companies in the aviation sector. With around 57,000 personnel, Swissport operates at 296 locations in 44 countries. It provides multiple services to their customers which include passenger services (check-in and gate agents, lounge hospitality), security services, baggage services including ramp handling, fueling, executive aviation and air cargo handling.

== History ==
The company was founded in 1996 as Swissair Ground Services International, independent of the former Swissair. In the following years, the company expanded both through organic growth and through various acquisitions. As part of the Swissair financial crisis, Swissport was first purchased by the British private equity firm Candover Investments and later sold in August 2005 to the Spanish construction company Ferrovial. In the meantime, the company had grown through various acquisitions. At the end of 2010, Ferrovial sold Swissport for €654 million to the French private equity firm PAI Partners.

In August 2013, Swissport announced the acquisition of competitor Servisair which bought Handlex in Canada, a part of the group Transat in 2012. In December 2013, the acquisition was approved, subject to conditions by the European Commission.

Over the years, Swissport has been the recipient of several industry awards including Ground Handling Award 2013, Air Cargo Handling Agent of the Year 2014 (for the sixth year in succession) and Global Aviation Ground Services Company 2012 (for the twelfth year in succession).

On 31 July 2015, China's HNA Group, the parent company of Hainan Airlines, announced that it would purchase Swissport for $2.81 billion US.

On 7 March 2018, Swissport concluded the acquisition of Aerocare and its subsidiaries Skycare, Carbridge and EasyCart from Archer Capital and the Aerocare management. Swissport now holds 100% of Aerocare, an Aviation Services and Airport Infrastructure Services provider in Australia and New Zealand.

On 8 June 2020, Swissport's Belgian subsidiary declared bankruptcy, which was confirmed by the Belgian commercial courts the following day.

On 25 June 2020, Swissport UK & Ireland announced a 50% reduction in its workforce of 8,500. In November 2020, Swissport USA filed for Chapter 15 bankruptcy.

In December 2020, Swissport had completed its comprehensive financial restructuring that began in August 2020. Ownership of the company has been transferred from the HNA Group to a group of financial investors led by the former senior secured lenders of Swissport. Their total existing debt was reduced by about €1.9 billion.
