= Airport Terminal 2 Station =

Airport Terminal 2 Station may refer to:

- Airport Terminal 2 Station (Taoyuan Metro), a station that serves Taoyuan International Airport, Taiwan.
- Haneda Airport Terminal 2 Station, a station that serves Haneda International Airport, Japan
- Haneda Airport Terminal 1·2 Station, a station that serves Haneda International Airport, Japan
- Narita Airport Terminal 2·3 Station, a station that serves Narita International Airport, Japan; previously known as Airport Terminal 2 Station.
- Heathrow Terminals 2 & 3 tube station, on the London Underground.
- Heathrow Terminals 2 & 3 railway station, served by the Elizabeth line and Heathrow Express trains.
