= Heathrow Terminal 1 =

Terminal at London Heathrow Airport (1968–2015)

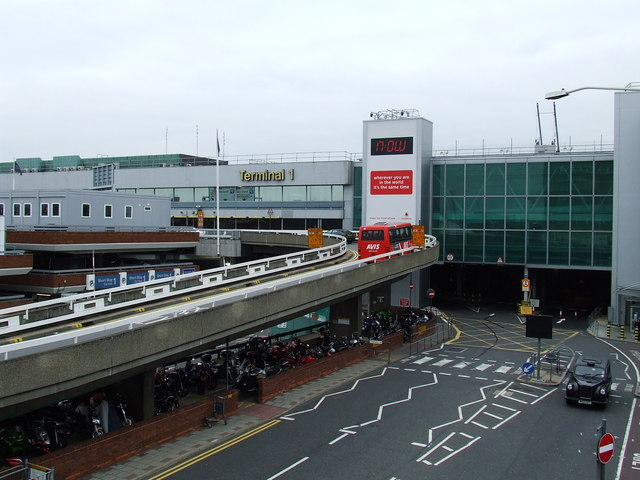
- Heathrow Terminal 1 in 2007

- Location within Greater London

General information
- Status: Partly demolished
- Type: Airport terminal
- Coordinates: 51.473°N 0.451°W
- Inaugurated: May 1969
- Renovated: 2005 (opening of Eastern Extension)
- Client: Heathrow Airport Holdings

Website
- Heathrow Airport

Heathrow Terminal 1 is a disused airport terminal at London Heathrow Airport that was in operation between 1968 and 2015. When it was officially opened by Queen Elizabeth II in April 1969, it was the largest new airport terminal in western Europe. At the time of its closure on 29 June 2015, to make way for the expansion of Heathrow Terminal 2, it had been handling only twenty daily flights by British Airways to nine destinations. From May 2017 the contents of the terminal were put up for auction. In 2025, plans were announced to demolish the building and expand Terminal 2, 10 years after its closure.

== History ==
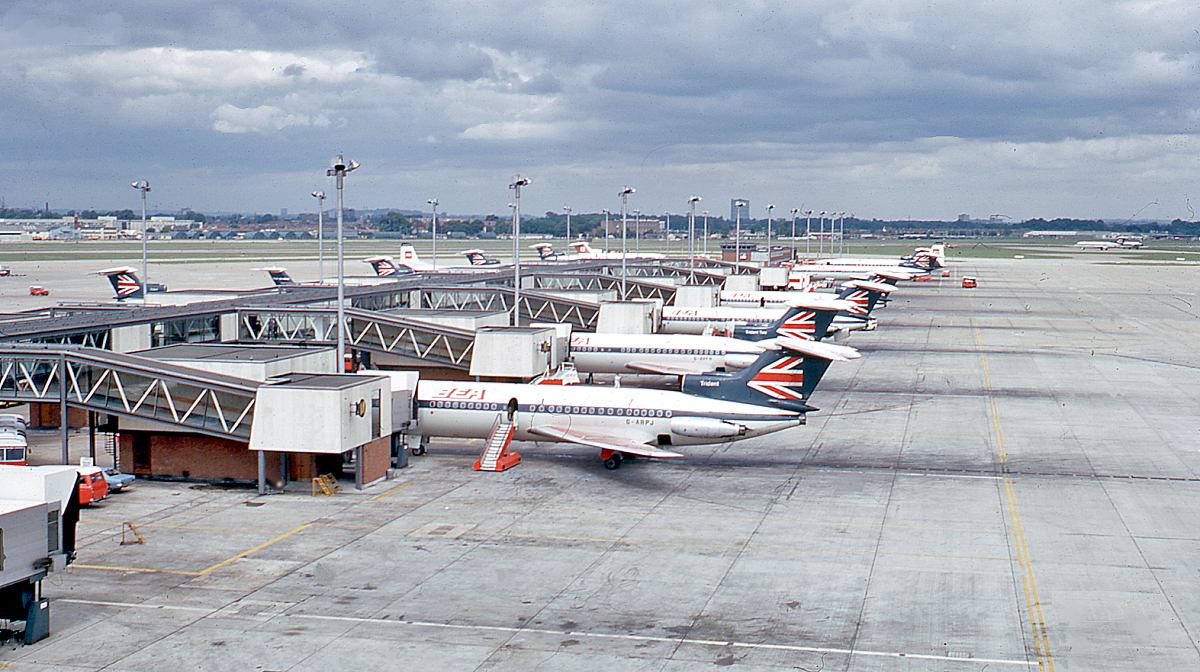
British European Airways aircraft at Terminal 1 in 1971

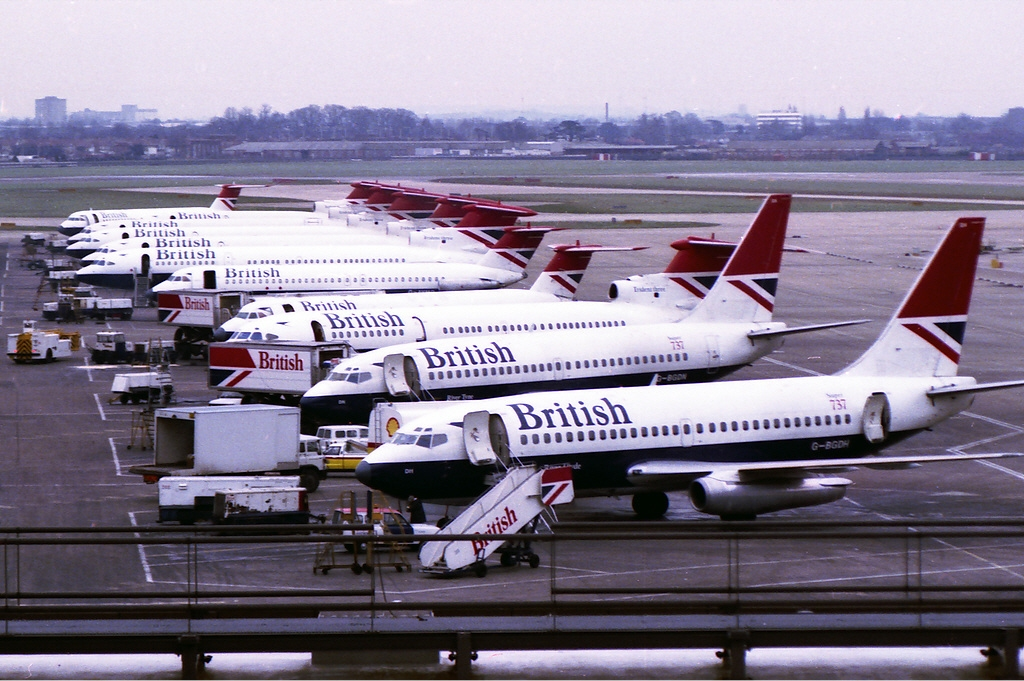
British Airways aircraft at Terminal 1 in the early 1980s

=== Foundation and use ===
Terminal 1 was designed by Frederick Gibberd, who also designed the earlier Europa Building (renamed Terminal 2) and the adjacent Queens Building. It opened to passengers in 1968, and it was formally opened by Queen Elizabeth II in April 1969. At the time, Terminal 1 was the biggest short-haul terminal of its kind in Western Europe. Prior to the opening of Terminal 5 in 2008, Terminal 1 hosted the bulk of UK domestic services in and out of Heathrow – predominantly British Airways and British Midland International (BMI).

A new pier (the so-called Europier) was added in the 1990s which increased the capacity of the terminal, catering for wide-body aircraft. There was separation between arriving and departing passengers within the International section, although the terminal was not originally built to cater for this separation. In 2005, a substantial redesign and redevelopment of Terminal 1 was completed, which saw the opening of the new Eastern Extension, doubling the departure lounge in size and creating additional seating and retail space.

After the buyout of BMI, British Airways served some short- and medium-haul destinations from this terminal. Virgin Atlantic operated its short-lived Little Red UK domestic operation from the former BMI departure area in Gate 8 of Terminal 1.

=== Closure ===
Terminal 1 closed on 29 June 2015 to allow the second stage of the expansion of Terminal 2 and all flights it was serving were relocated to other terminals. Several airlines had already left Terminal 1 from 2014. The last tenants alongside British Airways were Icelandair, El Al and TAM Airlines; TAM Airlines moved to Terminal 3 on 27 May 2015.

During Terminal 1's final days, British Airways was the last airline to operate there, with flights to Amman-Queen Alia, Baku, Beirut, Cairo and Hannover, which all moved to Terminal 5, and to Bilbao, Luxembourg, Lyon and Marseille, which were relocated to Terminal 3. The final flight to depart from Terminal 1 was British Airways BA0970 to Hannover, Germany, at 21:30 on 29 June 2015.

In 2018 an auction of the contents of Terminal 1 took place at the Thistle London Heathrow Hotel.

The main terminal building is now empty and some of the ancillary structures and contact piers have been demolished. Today the terminal is used for training and emergency services exercises. It also handles the baggage system for Terminal 2. In 2025 Heathrow Airport announced plans to demolish the main terminal building and expand Terminal 2.

== Facilities ==
Due to its impending closure, there were just seven shops left airside in the terminal by June 2015: Boots, Cocoon, Dixons Travel, Glorious Britain, WHSmith and World Duty Free. There was an airside link to Terminal 2 allowing passengers to use the facilities in that terminal. All Star Alliance members formerly in Terminal 1 moved to Terminal 2 due to its closure. The Star Alliance lounge, the El Al King David Lounge and the Servisair lounge were closed prior to the closure of the terminal. The British Airways International lounge near Gate 5 was operational until the end. The gates at Terminal 1 were numbered 2–8, 16–21 and 74–78. From 2017 the remaining contents of the terminal were sold at auction and by private treaty.

== Ground transport ==
=== Road links ===
As part of the three central terminals at Heathrow, it was linked to the M4 motorway via the M4 spur road and through a tunnel under the north runway. There was a short-stay car park directly opposite the terminal and a long-stay car park further away, accessed by a shuttle bus service.

=== Rail links ===
Terminal 1 was accessed by the London Underground Piccadilly line from Heathrow Terminals 1, 2, 3 tube station, with trains towards Cockfosters via Central London. The terminal was also accessed by Heathrow Connect and Heathrow Express from Heathrow Central railway station, where services operate to other Heathrow terminals and to London Paddington, until its closure in 2015, after which the station was renamed Heathrow Terminals 2 & 3.

=== Bus links ===
Terminal 1 was accessible to both bus and coach services from Heathrow Central bus station.
