= Heathrow Terminals 1, 2, 3 =

Heathrow Terminals 1, 2, 3 can refer to the following:

- Terminals at London Heathrow Airport
  - Terminal 1
  - Terminal 2
  - Terminal 3
- Transit stations
  - Heathrow Terminals 1, 2, 3 tube station, serving the Piccadilly line of the London Underground
  - Heathrow Terminals 1, 2 and 3 railway station, serving Heathrow Express and Heathrow Connect
