= Heathrow Terminal 4 =

Airport terminal at London Heathrow Airport

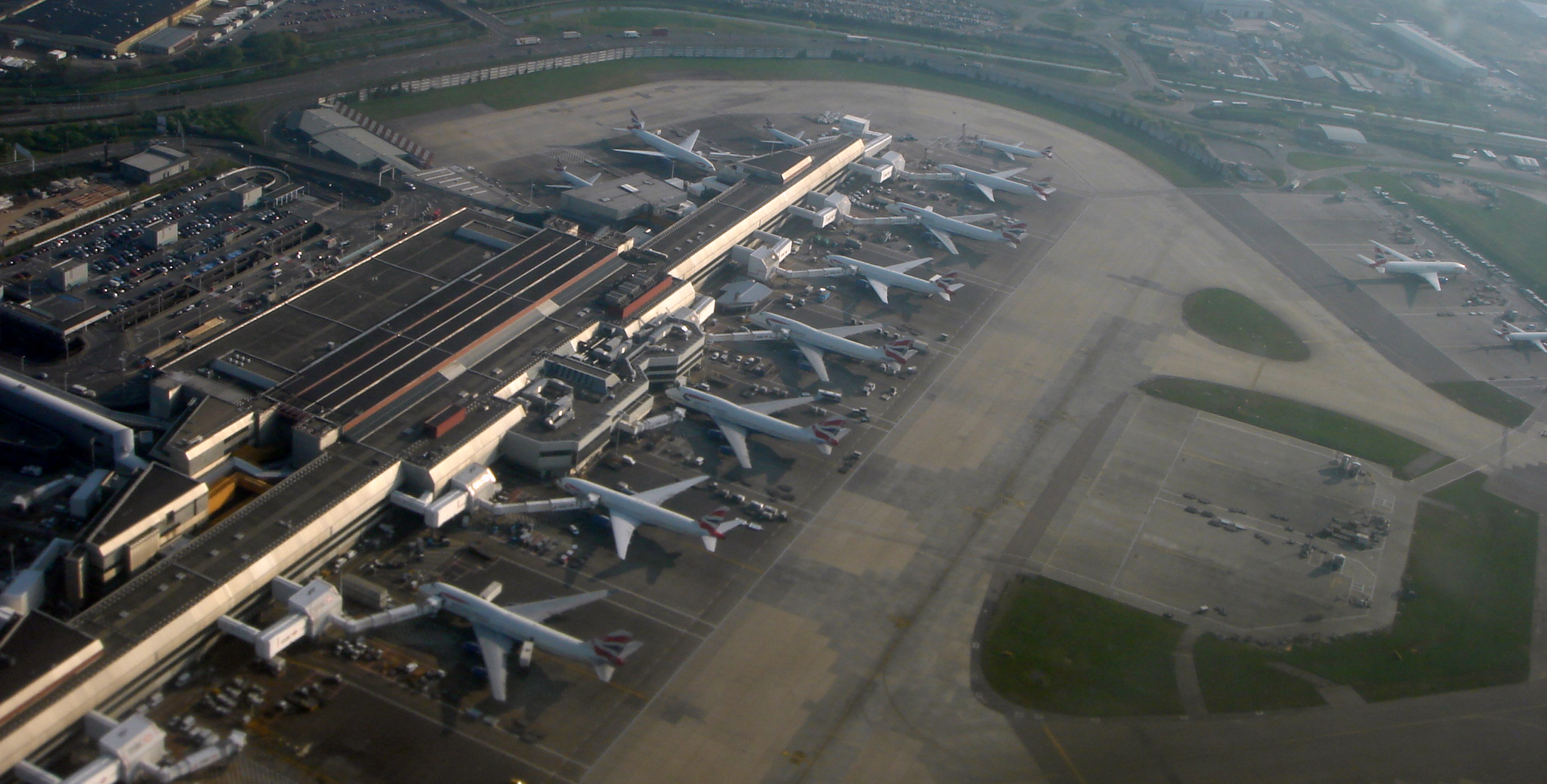
- Aerial view of terminal 4 during its use by British Airways

- Location within Greater London

General information
- Type: Airport terminal
- Location: Stratford Road, Hounslow, London
- Coordinates: 51.459455°N 0.446953°W
- Current tenants: SkyTeam alliance
- Inaugurated: 1 April 1986
- Renovated: 2009-2017
- Cost: £200 million

Technical details
- Floor area: 105,481 square metres (1,135,390 sq ft)

Design and construction
- Architect: Scott Brownrigg & Turner
- Main contractor: Taylor Woodrow Construction

Other information
- Public transit: Heathrow Terminal 4 railway station; Heathrow Terminal 4 tube station

Heathrow Terminal 4 is an airport terminal at Heathrow Airport, the main airport serving London, England, situated to the south of the southern runway, next to the cargo terminal. It is connected to Heathrow Terminals 2 and 3 by the vehicular Heathrow Cargo Tunnel, and by rail with the Heathrow Terminal 4 tube and Heathrow Terminal 4 railway stations.

The Prince and Princess of Wales opened Terminal 4 on 1 April 1986. British Airways was the main airline operating from the terminal from 1986 until its move to Terminal 5 on 29 October 2009, eventually making Terminal 4 the Heathrow base for airlines of the SkyTeam airline alliance.

== History ==
In 1979, approval for a fourth terminal at Heathrow Airport was granted. The new terminal was built south of the southern runway for £200 million over a 197-acre (80-hectare) site. The Prince and Princess of Wales opened Terminal 4 on 1 April 1986.

=== Construction ===
The public enquiry was from May to December 1978. Outline planning permission was given in December 1979. Full planning permission was given in September 1981. The main contractor was Taylor Woodrow Construction. Work on the foundations began in September 1981.

The architects were Ann Gibson, Ken Gilham, and John Church. Dunlop Transportation Systems made eight passenger conveyors, known as 'Starglide'. 15 escalators were made by O&K Escalators.

The terminal was to open in October 1985. The link to Hatton Cross was built by Taylor Woodrow and ThyssenKrupp. The Terminal 4 tube station built by Balfour Beatty, and the ticket hall.

== Overview ==
=== Terminal design ===
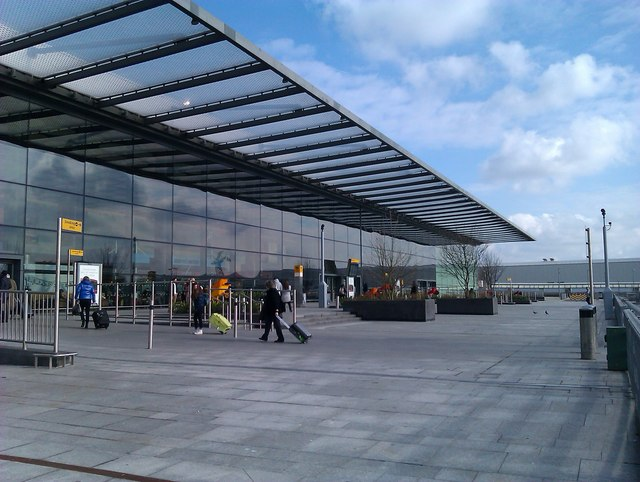
Passenger drop-off area, March 2013

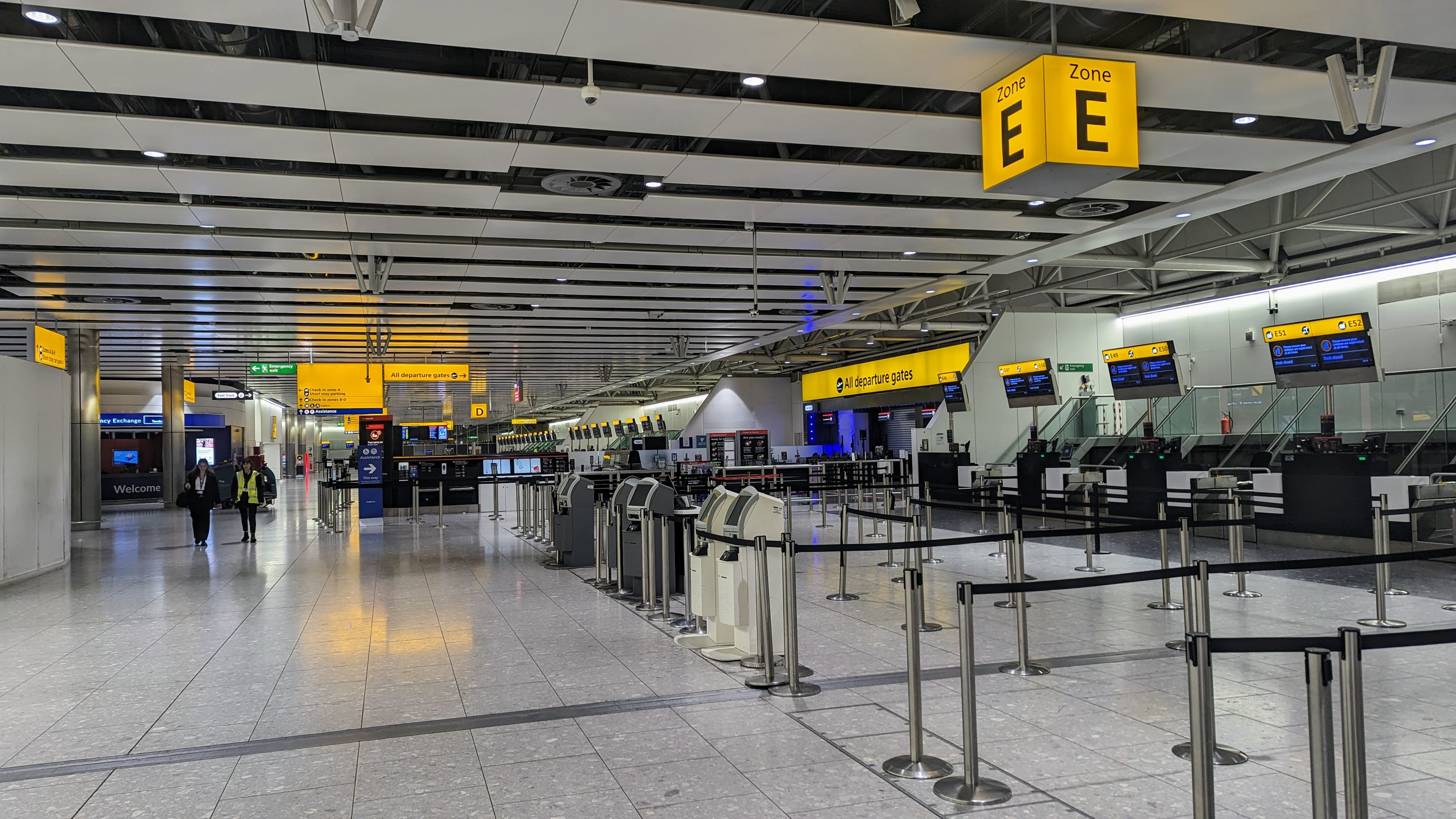
Check-in area in August 2023

Best known for its yellow jet bridges, the terminal was initially designed as a facility for short-haul 'point-to-point' traffic, to compensate for its relatively long distance from the airport's central terminal area (CTA). The layout of the terminal, with passenger boarding gates very close to the check-in and security halls, was designed to facilitate rapid movement of passengers through the building (a requirement for short-haul, business-focused flights). Upon opening, it boasted other innovations, including the complete segregation of arriving and departing passengers and a departure concourse over 1/3 mile (500 metres) long.

Lord King, then Chairman of British Airways, demanded that Terminal 4 be solely for the use of British Airways to fulfill the airline's ambition of hosting all its flights in one terminal (an ambition that still has not been achieved even with the opening of Terminal 5 in 2008). A similar demand was made on the North Terminal at Gatwick.

Terminal 4's distance from the CTA and design were ill-suited for British Airways' long-haul operations. Passengers had to transfer between Terminal 4 and the CTA by bus rather than by a short moving walkway (as between Terminals 1 and 3, for example), and once inside Terminal 4, the gate areas were not large enough to accommodate the 300–400 passengers waiting to board the Boeing 747s. Passengers' baggage also had to make the trip by van, sometimes resulting in the luggage being mislaid. However, this problem was somewhat alleviated in the late 1990s by the construction of an automated transfer tunnel between the CTA and Terminal 4.

=== Improvements and renovations ===
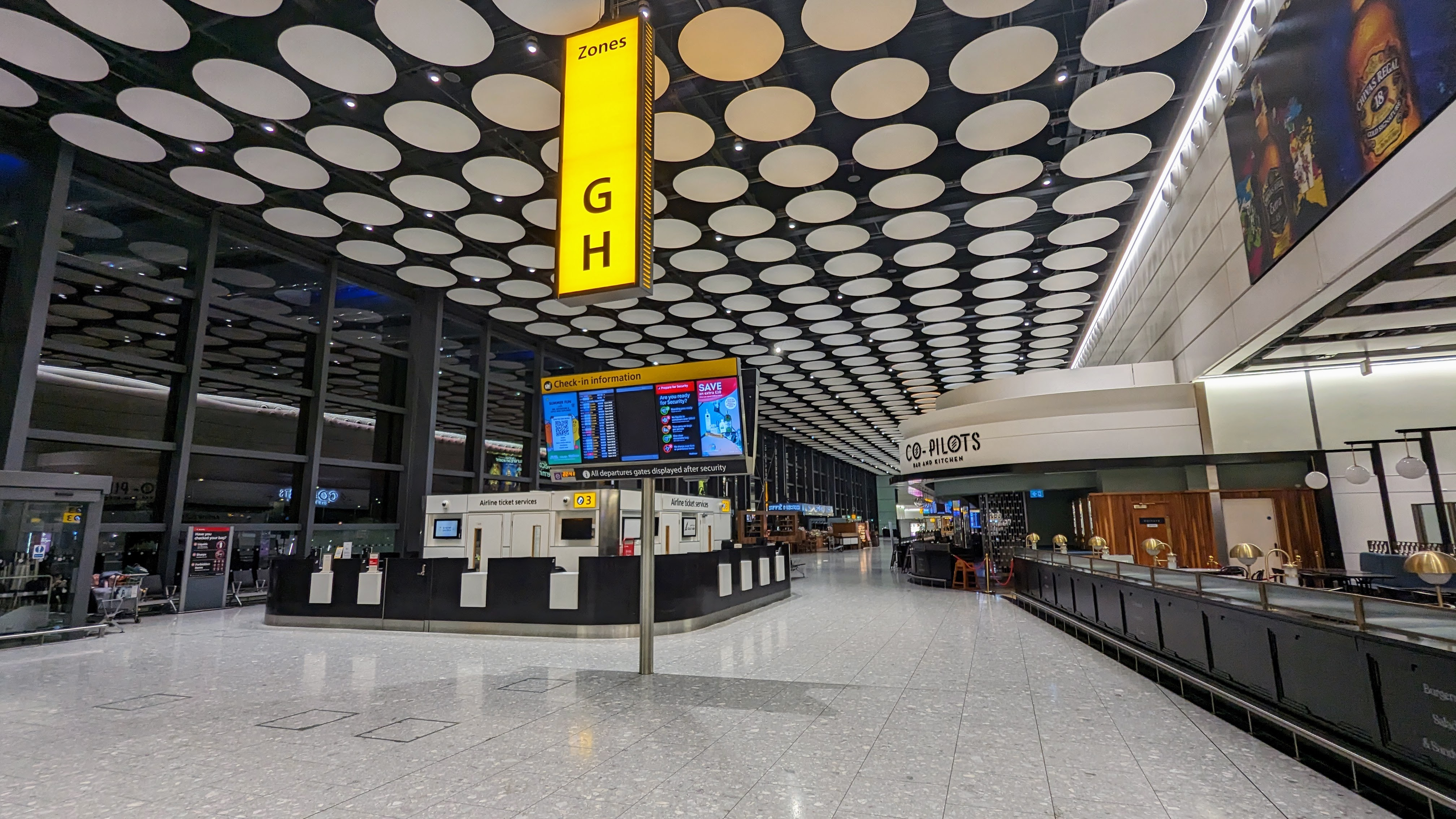
Terminal 4 in August 2023, after major renovations

Following the transfer of most of British Airways' flights to Terminal 5 in 2008, Terminal 4 underwent a £200m upgrade to accommodate 45 airlines and serve as the base for the SkyTeam airline alliance. The departures forecourt has been upgraded to reduce traffic congestion and improve security, and an extended check-in area opened in late 2009. Most internal areas of the terminal were renovated between 2009 and 2014. A new SkyTeam Alliance passenger lounge for premium passengers opened in 2009, followed by the Etihad Airways Lounge. A Malaysia Airlines Golden Lounge, Gulf Air Golden Falcon Lounge, Qatar Airways Premium Lounge and Plaza Premium Lounge have all opened since 2010. Two new stands to accommodate the Airbus A380 were constructed in 2009, and a further two opened in 2015. A new baggage system has also been installed. The refurbishment of the arrivals areas was completed in 2017.

=== Closure during the COVID-19 pandemic ===
In May 2020, all flights from Terminal 4 were suspended due to the COVID-19 pandemic. All rail and tube services to Terminal 4 station were withdrawn; TfL Rail services were diverted to Terminal 5. Heathrow also closed one of its runways in response to the drop in flights. In June 2021, Terminal 4 reopened as a terminal for passengers arriving from red-list countries only. The rail and underground stations remained closed at that time. Terminal 4 reopened on 14 June 2022.

== Usage ==
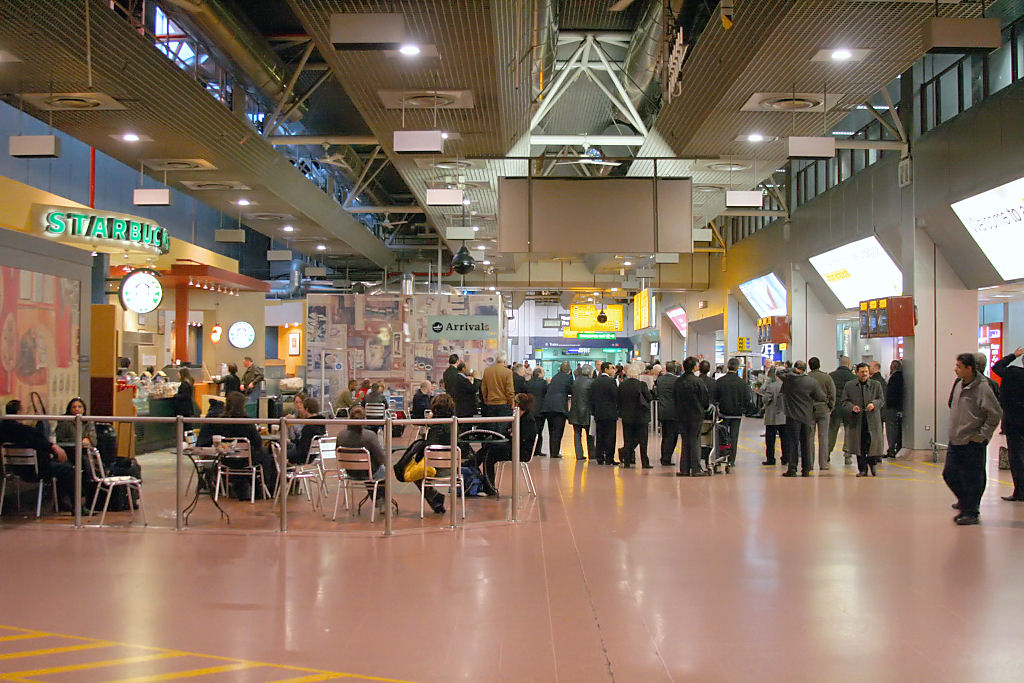
Terminal 4 interior, before refurbishment in 2012

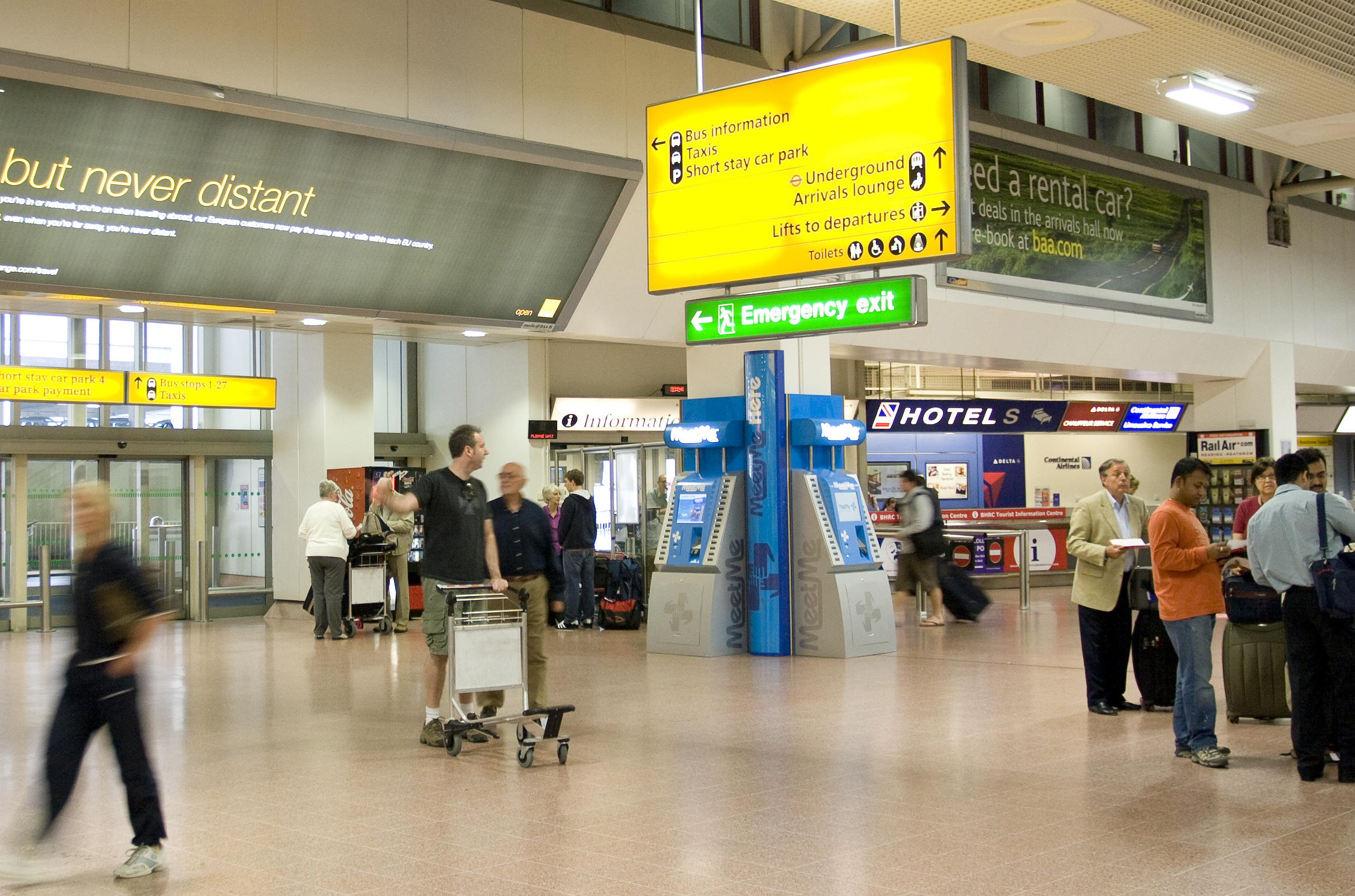
Arrivals at Terminal 4, before refurbishment in 2012

=== British Airways use (1986-2008) ===
British Airways was a prominent user of this terminal until its move to Terminal 5 in 2008. However, despite the airline being based there, Terminal 4 was also used by Qantas until its move to Terminal 3.

=== SkyTeam ===
Terminal 4 is the base for SkyTeam members except Aeroméxico, Virgin Atlantic, and China Airlines (all Terminal 3 only) alongside Scandinavian Airlines and Middle East Airlines (both uses Terminal 2). Delta Air Lines was a mainstay at Terminal 4 until it later joined these carriers at Terminal 3 on September 14, 2016 for easier connectivity with Virgin Atlantic.

=== Others ===
Four Oneworld members fly out of Terminal 4: Malaysia Airlines, Royal Air Maroc, Qatar Airways, and Oman Air. SriLankan Airlines formerly operated from Terminal 4 but shortly after it joined Oneworld in 2014, it transferred its flights to Terminal 3.

The principal non-aligned airlines are KM Malta Airlines, China Southern Airlines, El Al, Etihad Airways, Gulf Air, and Royal Brunei Airlines. Other non-aligned airlines are Air Algerie, Air Astana, Air Serbia, Azerbaijan Airlines, Biman Bangladesh Airlines, Bulgaria Air, Kuwait Airways, Tunisair, Uzbekistan Airlines, Vueling and WestJet.

== Ground transport ==
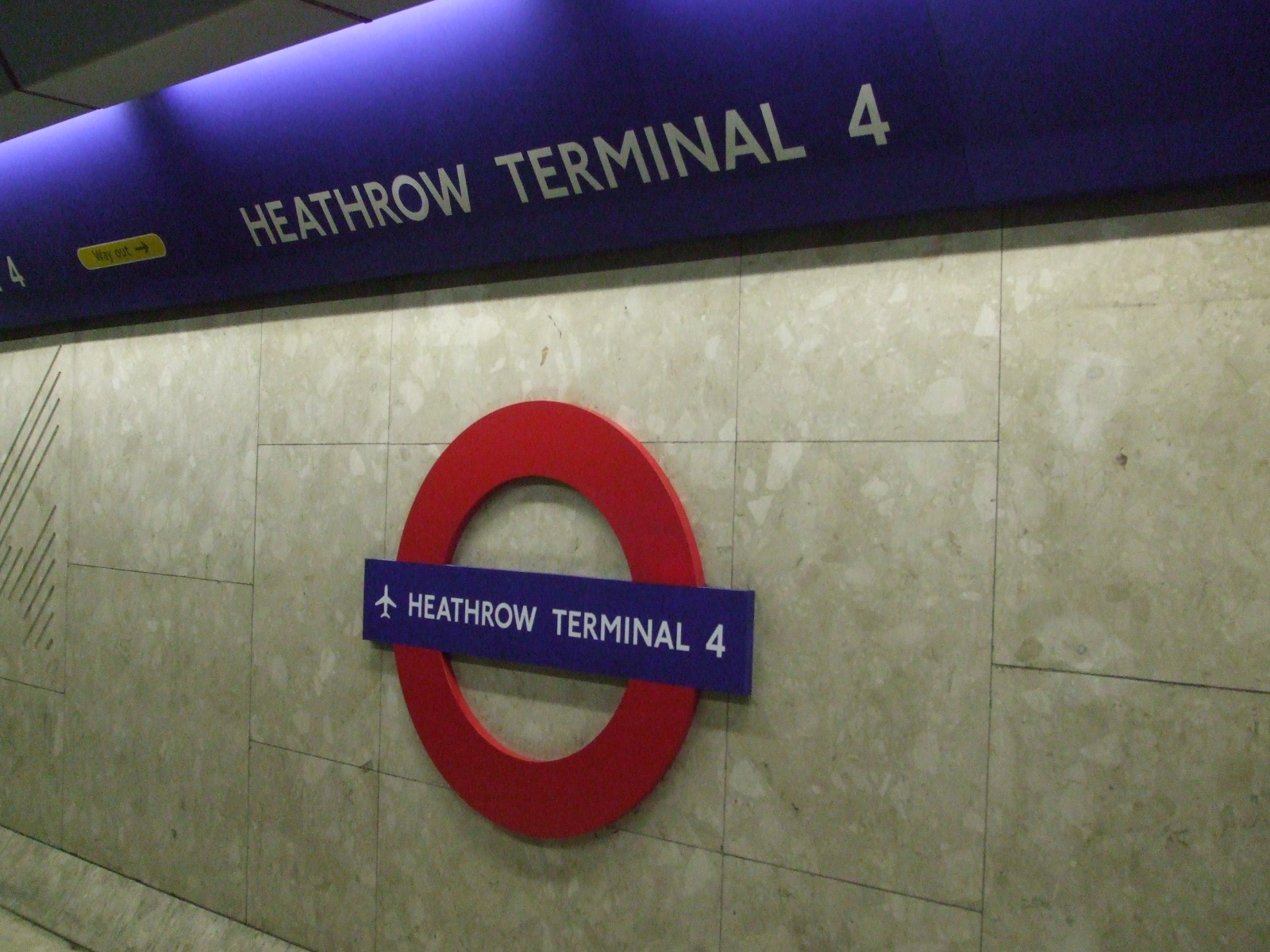
Heathrow Terminal 4 tube station

=== Road links ===
Terminal 4 is accessed from Junction 14 of the M25 motorway via the A3113 and then the Southern Perimeter Road. It is also accessible from Central London via the M4, exiting at Junction 3. There was a short stay car park directly opposite the terminal which closed in June 2026 for redevelopment and upgrade passengers are now encouraged to park in the long stay car park on the other side of the twin rivers and take the shuttle bus to Terminal 4.

=== Rail links ===
Terminal 4 is served by the London Underground's Piccadilly line trains at Heathrow Terminal 4 tube station and by Elizabeth line trains at Heathrow Terminal 4 railway station. All trains between the Heathrow terminals are free.

The Piccadilly line has up to six trains per hour (about every 10 minutes) in the direction of Cockfosters via central London. Trains to central London run via Heathrow Terminals 2 & 3 tube station. They may wait at Heathrow Terminal 4 for up to eight minutes. Although the journey takes longer, fares are much cheaper than on the Elizabeth Line and Heathrow Express services.

=== Bus links ===
Some local buses, coach services, and car parking serve Terminal 4.
