= Heathrow Terminal 4 station =

Heathrow Terminal 4 station can refer to the following:

- Heathrow Terminal 4 railway station, a National Rail station
- Heathrow Terminal 4 tube station, a London Underground station
