= Heathrow Terminal 2 =

Airport terminal at London Heathrow Airport

Heathrow Terminal 2 The Queen's Terminal
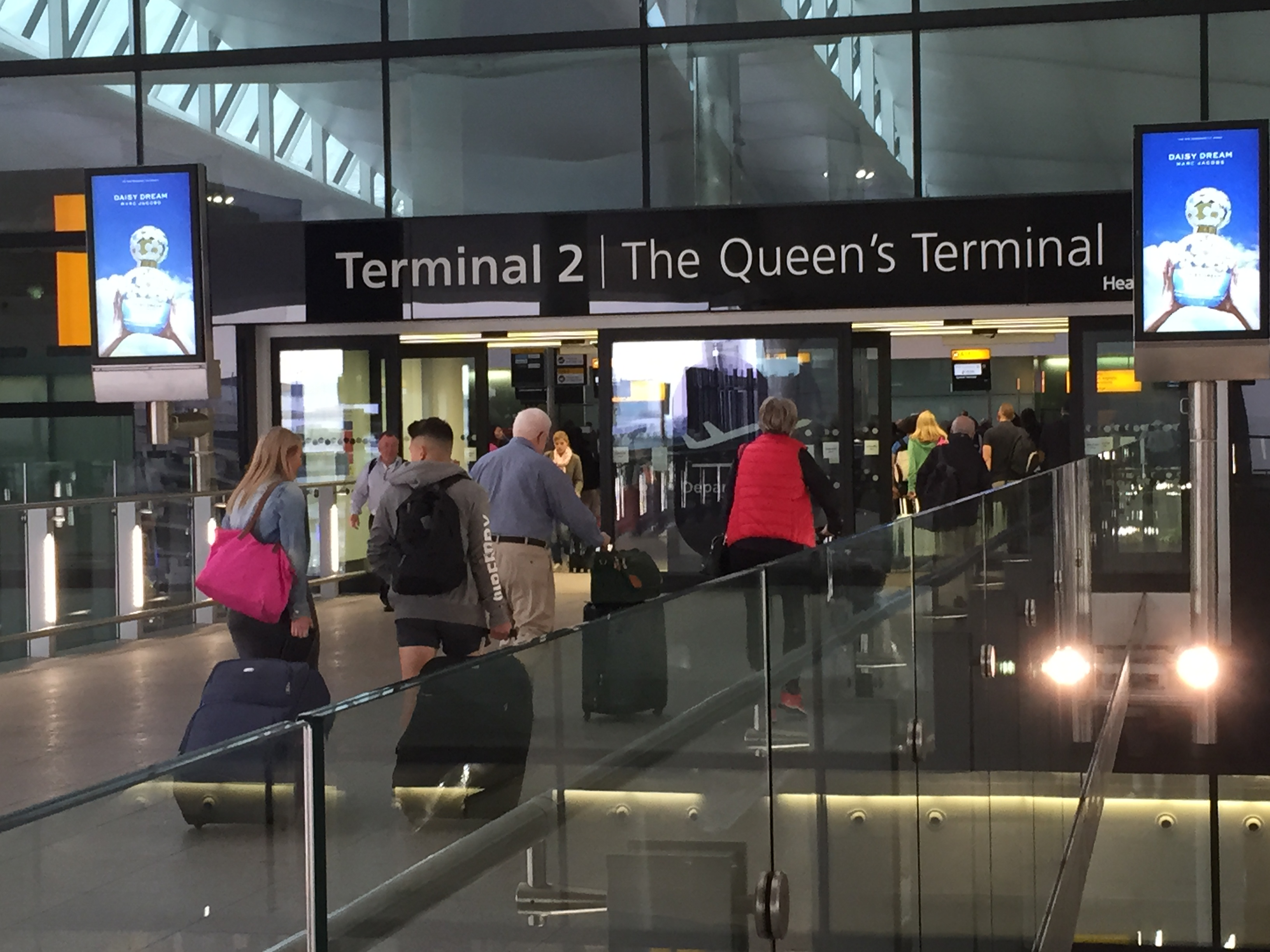
- Entrance to the terminal

- Location within Greater London
- Alternative names: London Heathrow Terminal 2, Heathrow East Terminal (formerly), Heathrow T2

General information
- Type: Airport terminal
- Coordinates: 51.47029°N 0.45205°W
- Construction started: July 2010 (current terminal)
- Completed: June 2014 (current terminal)
- Opened: 4 June 2014 (current terminal)
- Inaugurated: 23 June 2014 (current terminal)
- Cost: £2.3 billion
- Client: Heathrow Airport Holdings

Technical details
- Structural system: Steel frame

Design and construction
- Architects: Luis Vidal, Foster + Partners
- Architecture firm: Luis Vidal + Architects
- Other designers: Pascall+Watson, Foster and Partners and Grimshaw Architects
- Main contractor: HETCo (a joint venture between Ferrovial Agroman and Laing O'Rourke and Balfour Beatty).

Other information
- Public transit: Heathrow Terminals 2 & 3 railway station; Heathrow Terminals 2 & 3 tube station; Heathrow Central bus station

Heathrow Terminal 2, also known as The Queen's Terminal (after Elizabeth II) is a passenger terminal at Heathrow Airport, the largest airport serving London, United Kingdom. The new development was originally named Heathrow East Terminal, and occupies the sites where the previous Terminal 2 and the Queens Building stood. It was designed by Luis Vidal + Architects and opened on 4 June 2014. The original Terminal 2 opened in 1955 as the first terminal at Heathrow, named the Europa Building. When Terminal 1 was built in May 1969, the Europa Building was renamed Terminal 2 to avoid confusion.

Terminal 1 closed to passengers on 30 June 2015, although as Terminal 1's baggage system is used by Terminal 2, part of it will remain operational. Terminal 1 is due to be demolished, allowing for Terminal 2 to be extended at an as yet undisclosed date. In 2015, Terminal 2 handled 16.7 million passengers on 116,861 flights and 22.5% of the airport's passengers on 25.2% of its flights with an average of 130 passengers per flight.

== History ==
=== Original terminal ===
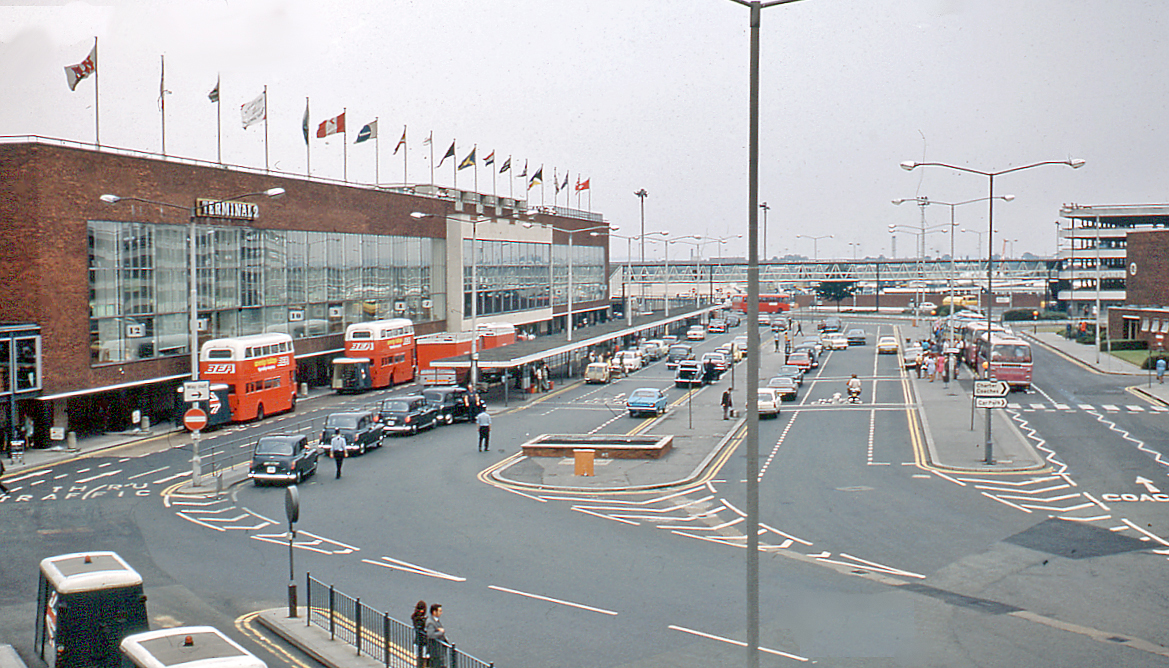
Former Terminal 2 building in 1972

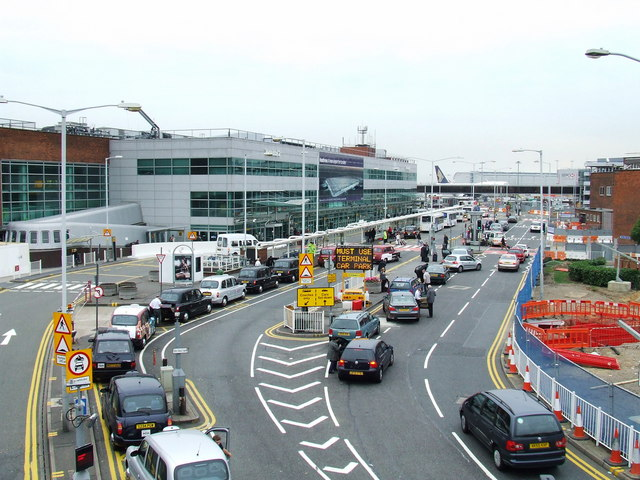
Former Terminal 2 building in 2007

The first building to be known as Terminal 2 was Heathrow's oldest terminal. It was designed by Frederick Gibberd and opened as the Europa Building in 1955. He also designed the adjacent Queens Building.

The old Terminal 2 had an area of 49,654 square metres (534,470 sq ft) and in its lifetime saw 316 million passengers pass through its doors. Originally designed to handle around 1.2 million passengers annually, in its final years of operation it often accommodated around 8 million.

On 20 April 1984, a bomb exploded in the baggage area of T2, injuring 22 people, including one seriously.

Despite the efforts of maintenance staff and various renovations and upgrades over the years, the building became increasingly decrepit and unserviceable. It was closed on 23 November 2009; Air France flight AF1881 to Paris was the last flight to depart from the terminal. The building was demolished in 2010, and the resulting space was combined with the adjacent area where the Queen's Building stood until its demolition in 2009 to form the site for the new terminal.

=== New terminal ===
Approval for the new terminal, originally named Heathrow East, was granted by the then-Mayor of London Ken Livingstone and Hillingdon Council in May 2007.

==== Design ====
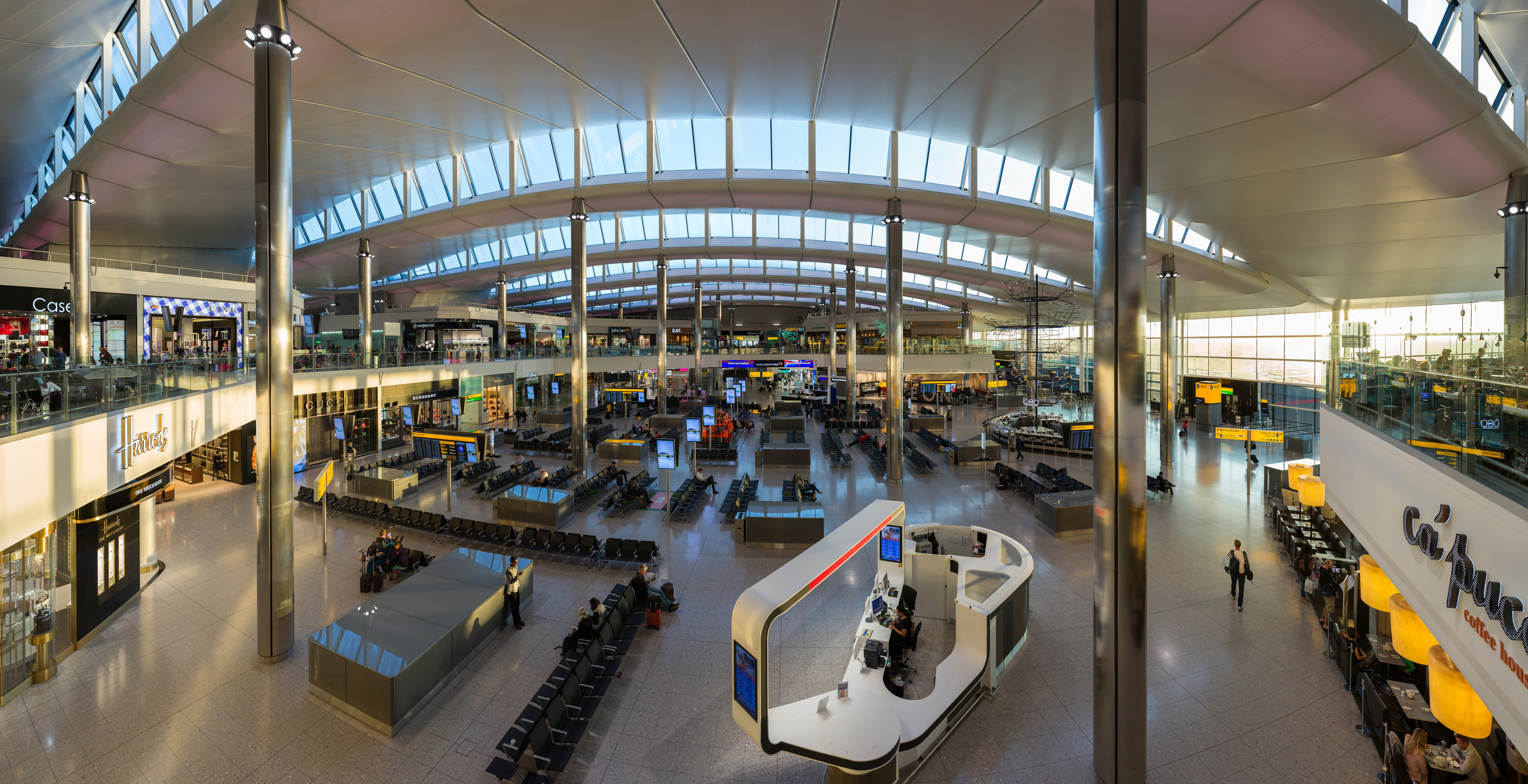
Terminal 2 departures area

The new terminal's design continues the "toast rack" principle employed in the construction of Terminal 5, a layout that maximises use of the airport's land by placing the terminal building and its satellites perpendicular to the runways. Like Terminal 5, much of the building was constructed off-site, helping to overcome many of the logistical constraints of building in one of the world's busiest international airports.

The terminal is split into two connected buildings, Terminal 2A and Terminal 2B. 2A was designed by Luis Vidal + Architects (LVA) and built by a joint venture between Ferrovial and Laing O'Rourke. All European carriers except Icelandair use terminal 2A to board and disembark passengers. Air Canada and Turkish Airlines also use this building for their short haul flights. 2B was designed by Grimshaw Architects, and built by Balfour Beatty. All international carriers use terminal 2B. Icelandair is the only European carrier to use Terminal 2B.

The gates in the new T2 are numbered in concourse A (gates 1–26) and concourse B (gates 28–49).

The new Terminal 2 is designed to produce 40% fewer carbon dioxide emissions than the buildings it has replaced. 20% of this target will be achieved through energy efficiency design technology elements, such as high levels of insulation, a comprehensive colour changing LED lighting installation designed by StudioFractal and extensive natural lighting. Large north-facing windows in the roof will flood the building with natural light, reducing the need for artificial lighting, without generating excess heat. Photovoltaic (solar) panels on the roof will further reduce dependency on energy supplies. The remaining 20% carbon reduction will be due to the new T2 Energy Centre, via biomass CHP fuelled by woodchips from local renewable resources, will provide heating and cooling to both Heathrow Terminal 2 and Heathrow Terminal 5.

==== Construction ====
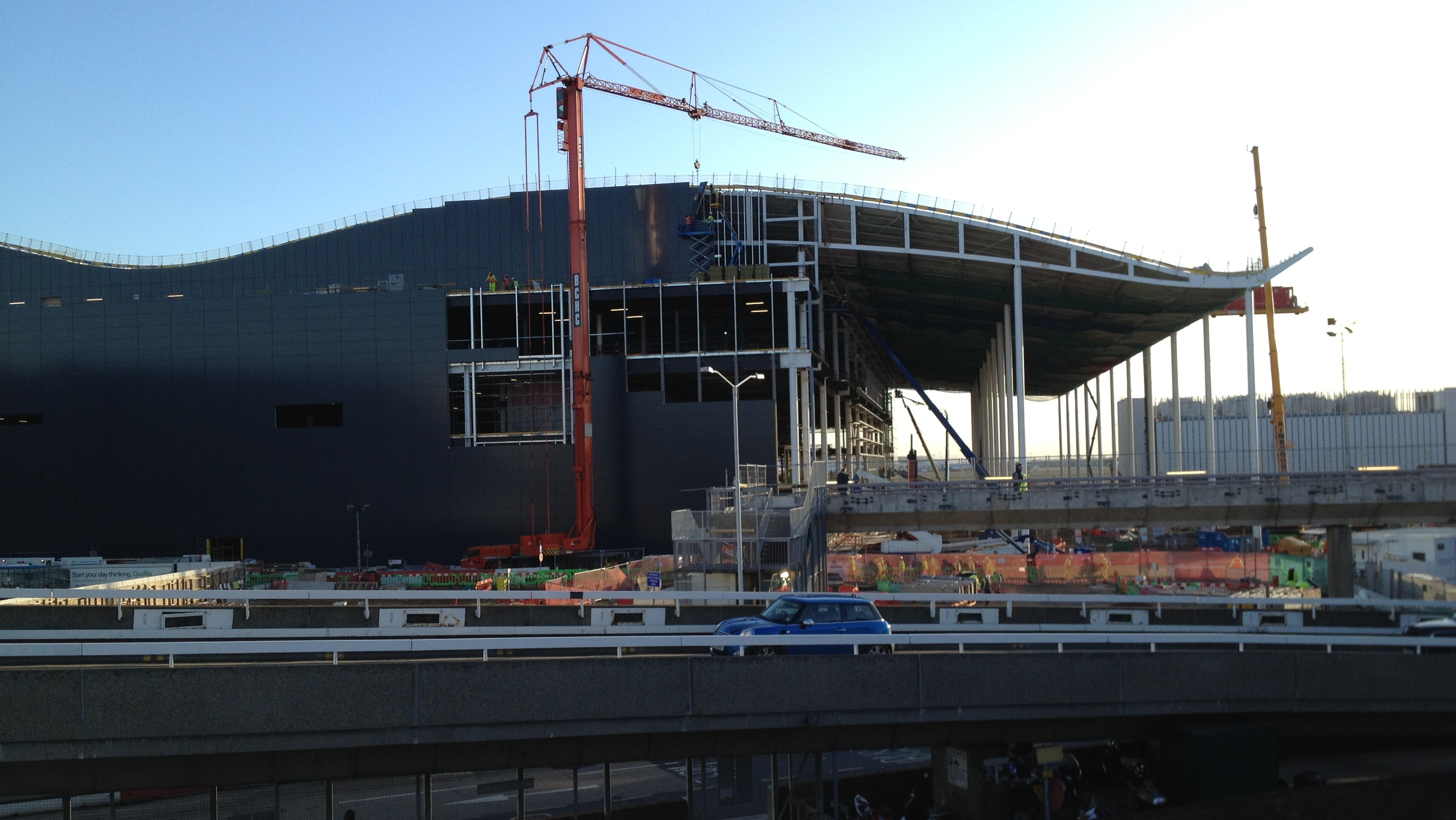
The new Terminal 2 building under construction, January 2012

Construction of the terminal has been spread across two phases. The first phase, started in 2009 and completed in June 2014, involved the demolition of the old terminal and construction of half of the main terminal building, and the completion of the 522-metre (1,713 ft) satellite building Terminal 2B. The second phase is due to begin after the demolition of Terminal 1 and will involve the construction of the second half of Terminal 2 in its place. It had originally been expected that the second phase would be completed around 2019, but in February 2013 Heathrow Airport Ltd. confirmed the project would not be expected to be complete until the next decade. Once complete the terminal will have a footprint and operational capacity very similar to that of Terminal 5.

Phase 1 was once expected to be completed in 2012, in time for the 2012 Summer Olympics, but as construction started much later than proposed it only opened in June 2014.

By January 2013, Terminal 2A had been declared weather-tight and the internal fit-out of the building was well under way. In spring 2013 systems installation commenced. The first phase of Terminal 2B was completed in November 2009 and its six gates became operational in early 2010. Until Terminal 2 was completed, passengers accessed the first part of Terminal 2B via a temporary "bridge" from Terminal 1.

Demolition of the original airport control tower which formed part of the Central Terminal Area of the airport began in January 2013 and was completed in autumn 2013, to make way for connecting roads that have been built to link with the new Terminal 2. Air traffic control operations had moved to a new control tower in 2007 but part of the building remained in use as office space.

In June 2013 it was announced that the terminal would be known as "Terminal 2 – The Queen's Terminal". The terminal features a sculpture designed by Richard Wilson, called Slipstream. It has been designed to resemble a stunt aircraft in flight, and has been described as the longest permanent sculpture in Europe. A second sculpture, named Emergence, was created by Cinimod Studio and is suspended within the terminal.

==== Opening ====
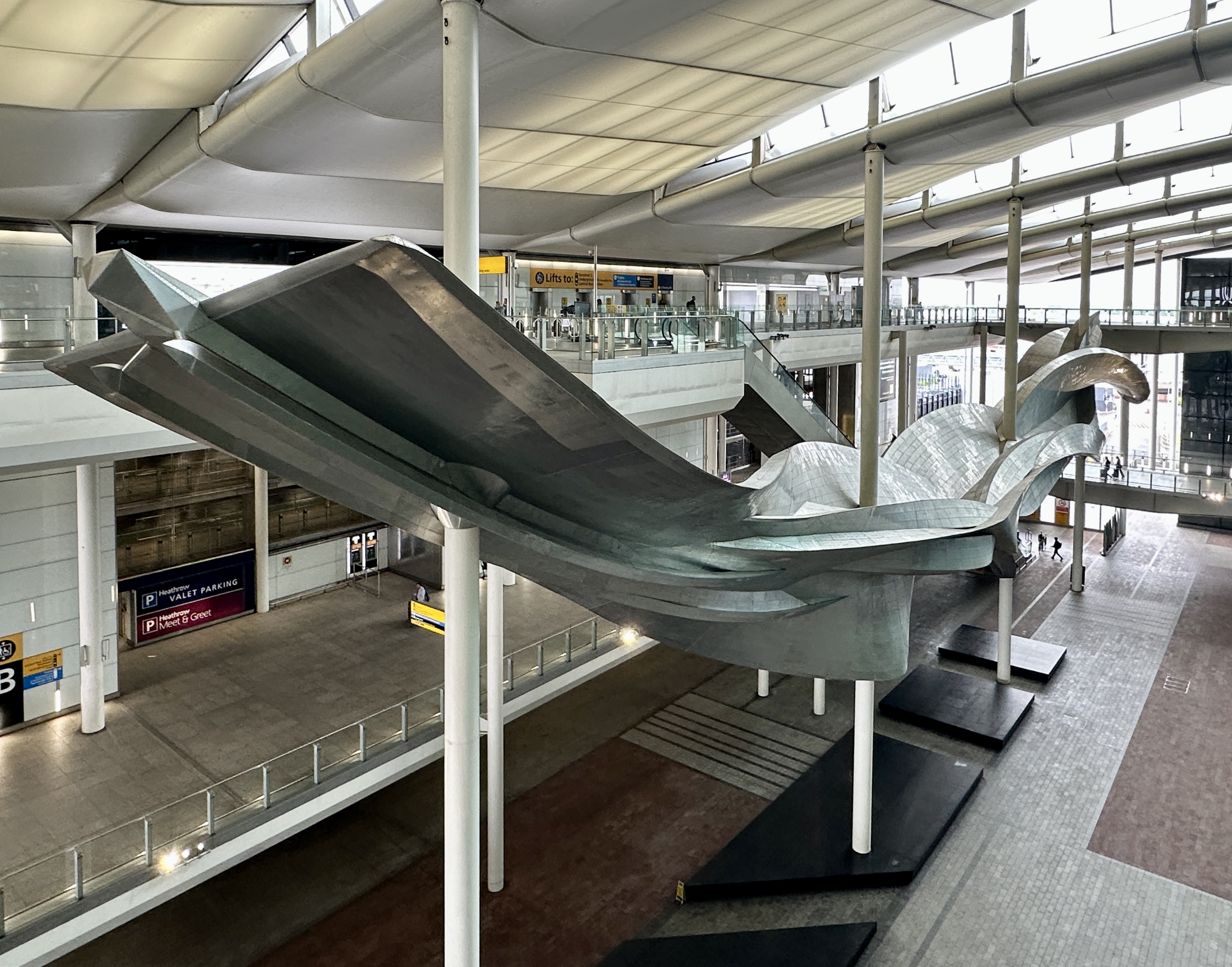
Slipstream has been described as the longest permanent sculpture in Europe.

The first flight to arrive at the terminal was United Airlines flight UA958 from Chicago O'Hare, landing at 5:49 am local time on 4 June 2014. Queen Elizabeth II officially opened the terminal on 23 June 2014 after Air Canada, Air China, and All Nippon Airways moved in on 18 June 2014.

After a period of phased moves, the terminal has become home to Star Alliance, as part of Heathrow Airport's plan to maximise the efficiency of the airport by reducing transfer times and improving the passenger experience. The new terminal will have capacity for 30 million passengers each year.

== Airlines / Alliances ==
Terminal 2 was the main base for Virgin Atlantic Little Red until it ceased operations in 2015. Today, most flights to/from Terminal 2 are short haul flights to mainland Europe. There are a few long haul flights from this terminal. Because of the area size of the terminal, it is the only terminal at Heathrow Airport to accommodate the ATR turboprop, the Embraer E-Jet family and other smaller aircraft.

=== Star Alliance ===
Terminal 2 is the base for Star Alliance members that fly from Heathrow today. All airlines transferred from other terminals by January 2017, with Air India shifting from Terminal 4 to Terminal 2 on 25 January 2017. There is no common Star Alliance lounge in the terminal; Lufthansa has a lounge in the main terminal, while Air Canada, Singapore Airlines and United Airlines each have lounges in the satellite.

In the main terminal there are also an Aer Lingus lounge and a Plaza Premium pay-as-you-go lounge.

=== SkyTeam ===
Scandinavian Airlines (a former Star Alliance member which switched alliances to Skyteam in 2024) still operates their services at Heathrow in and out from Terminal 2.

Middle East Airlines have also been removed back to Terminal 2 recently, from Terminal 3.

==== Closure of Terminal 4 in 2020 - 2021 ====
Between 3 May 2020 and 15 July 2021, all SkyTeam members used Terminal 2 due to the closure of Terminal 4. However, on 15 July 2021, Delta Air Lines moved back to Terminal 3 as the first operators at Terminal 3 along with Virgin Atlantic. In August 2021, SkyTeam members Air France, Kenya Airways, KLM, Korean Air and Middle East Airlines joined Delta at Terminal 3 while Aeroflot, China Airlines, China Eastern Airlines, ITA Airways, Saudia, TAROM and Vietnam Airlines stayed at Terminal 2. Beginning 14 June 2022, ITA Airways, Saudia, TAROM and Vietnam Airlines moved back to Terminal 4 on different days. Whilst China Airlines moved back to Terminal 3.

=== Non-alliance airlines ===
5 non-aligned airlines also operate from this terminal: Aer Lingus, Eurowings, Icelandair, JetBlue, and Loganair. Eurowings is a Lufthansa subsidiary that has replaced Lufthansa on flights to German destinations other than to Frankfurt and Munich. On 12 August 2021, JetBlue began their first transatlantic services to/from John F. Kennedy International Airport on Airbus A321LR aircraft.

Terminal 2 is set up to handle not only international flights, but also UK domestic and Irish flights, which is like Terminal 5 and unlike Terminals 3 and 4. Aer Lingus and Loganair serve UK domestic and Irish flights from this terminal.

Several other non-aligned airlines operated from this terminal until they stopped flying to Heathrow. Flybe flew to this terminal from 25 March 2017 until 5 March 2020 when the airline filed for administration. Flybe relaunched from this terminal until it entered administration again in 2023. Widerøe operated from this terminal until it moved its operations to Stansted Airport on 25 March 2023. Sky Express operated from Terminal 2, until moving operations to Gatwick Airport on 31 March 2023.

== Ground transport ==
=== Inter-terminal transport ===
Terminal 2 is connected by an underground walkway to Terminal 3. Terminals 4 and 5 can be reached by the free Elizabeth line or Heathrow Express rail service. London Underground services can also be used to transfer to Terminals 4 and 5 (the former requiring a change of train at Hatton Cross); this service is free to Oyster card holders and those paying via contactless payment.

In addition, numerous buses ply between the Central Bus Station (for Terminals 2 and 3) and the other terminals. However, using the train service is much quicker and easier for passengers with luggage. In June 2021, free bus travel between terminals ceased.

=== Road links ===
As part of the two central terminals at Heathrow, it is well linked to the M4 motorway via the M4 spur road and through a tunnel under the north runway.

=== Rail links ===
Terminal 2 is served by regular rail services from Heathrow Central and Heathrow Terminals 2 & 3 tube station. These stations, shared with Heathrow Terminal 3, are situated in the central terminal area and provide regular connections to other Heathrow terminals, to Central London, the London Underground network, and local destinations. As of 2022, services run from the early morning until approximately midnight.

- Heathrow Express (4 trains per hour) operates express train services between Heathrow Terminal 5 station and London Paddington. Services to London operate non-stop for a journey time of approximately 15 minutes. Free interchange is permitted between Heathrow Central and Heathrow Terminal 5.
- Elizabeth line (4 trains per hour) operates local stopping services to Abbey Wood via London Paddington. Services from London alternate calling at Heathrow Terminal 4 and Heathrow Terminal 5. Free interchange is permitted between all Heathrow airport stations via Elizabeth line. On completion of the project in 2023, Elizabeth line trains will also provide cross-London service between Heathrow and Shenfield in the east of London.
- Piccadilly line of the London Underground (up to 12 trains per hour) operates services to Cockfosters via Central London. Heathrow Airport stations are situated in London fare zone 6.

Additionally, RailAir coach services provide coach connections between Heathrow bus station (see below) and rail stations in Reading and Woking, with integrated ticketing available for continuing journeys to regional and long-distance destinations via the National Rail network.

=== Bus links ===
Terminal 2 is accessible to both bus and coach services from Heathrow Central bus station.

There are also several coach services operated by National Express operating to other London airports such as Gatwick, Stansted and Luton, and other cities in the United Kingdom.
