= T2 Energy Centre =

English power station

Coordinates: 51.459423°N 0.459365°W

The T2 Energy Centre is a biomass-fuelled combined heating and power (CHP) station at Heathrow Airport in London which opened in December 2012. It provides heat to half of the active terminals: Terminal 2 and Terminal 5 and electricity into the local grid, similar to some of the airport's operations demands.

== Operation ==
The energy centre, which has a CHP base heating load of 9 MW (thermal) and a biomass CHP power output of 1.8 MW (electric), took its first delivery of woodchip fuel in November 2012.

The Energy Centre uses 25,000 tonnes of woodchips a year, which is sourced within a 100-mile radius of Heathrow airport from sustainable woodlands such as the WWT London Wetland Centre in Barnes, London and Richmond Park which ensures low haulage requirements, costs and CO_{2} emissions. The resulting ash is recycled and used to make fertiliser for local agriculture and manufacturing, eliminating the need to send the ash to landfill. Heathrow claims that the wood fuel process will enable it to save at least 13,000 tonnes of CO_{2} emissions per year, compared with producing the same output from natural gas, and to reduce its carbon footprint by 34 per cent by 2020. The electricity generated is fed into the local grid.

== Award ==
In September 2012, the Chartered Institute of Purchasing & Supply awarded Heathrow Airport Limited for 'Best Contribution to Corporate Responsibility' with regard to the energy plant.
