= Slipstream (sculpture) =

2014 sculpture by Richard Wilson

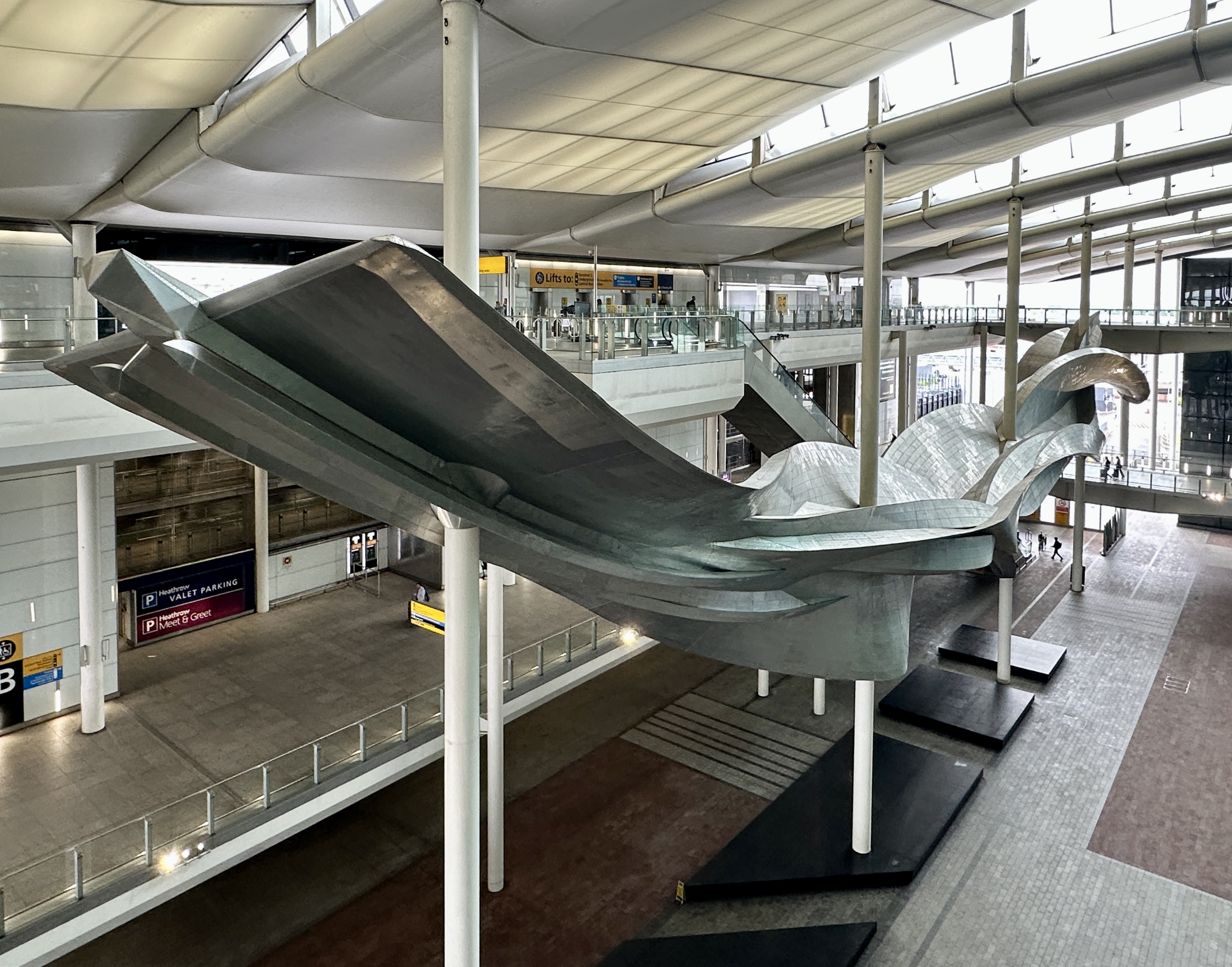
- Artist: Richard Wilson
- Year: 2014
- Dimensions: 70 m (230 ft)
- Weight: 77 tonnes
- Location: Heathrow Airport, London
- 51.4697°N 0.4497°W

Slipstream is a sculpture by Richard Wilson, created in 2014 for the wholly re-built Terminal 2 at Heathrow Airport, London. The large art intervention of aviation relevance was loosely specified, approved and project managed by Mark Davy, founder of the cultural and place-making agency Futurecity for the airport as owner. It is currently the largest privately funded sculpture for a commercial site in Europe. The winning proposal was selected from a shortlist of five international artists.

The sculpture is over 70 metres (230 ft) long and weighs 77 tonnes (76 long tons; 85 short tons). The structural engineers Price & Myers and specialist fabricators Commercial Systems International (CSI) were tasked with making the sculpture.

Wilson's intention is "to transpose the thrill of the air‐show to the architectural environment of the international air terminal".

Reconstruction of Terminal 2 started in 2010, and it was officially reopened on 4 June 2014. The sculpture received the 2014 Marsh Award for Excellence in Public Sculpture.
