= Luis Vidal (architect) =

Spanish architect

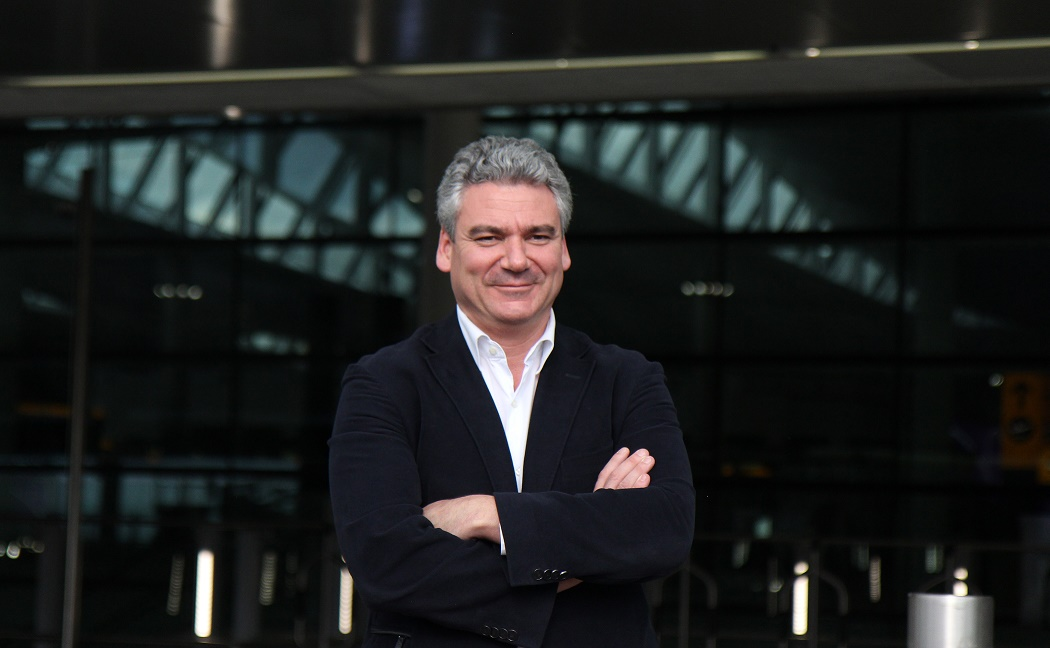
- Born: Luis Vidal; 16 January 1969 (age 57); Barcelona, Spain
- Occupation: Architect
- Practice: Luis Vidal+Architects
- Website: luisvidal.com

Luis Vidal (born 1969) is a Spanish architect. He is the founder of the firm luis vidal+architects. Amongst his most known works stand out Heathrow Airport T2 (United Kingdom), Boston Logan's Airport Terminal E, (USA), , Pittsburgh International Airport (USA), Madrid Barajas Terminal 4 (Spain), the Can Misses Hospital in Ibiza (Spain), the Alvaro Cunqueiro Hospital in Vigo (Spain) and the New Colon Towers in Madrid (Spain).

As of May 2026, luis vidal+architect is working on the project for the New Terminal One at JFK International Airport in New York (USA), as well as the total renovation of the Schipol Airport in Amsterdam (The Netherlands), among other major infrastructure projects.

== Early life and education ==
Vidal was born in Barcelona on January 16, 1969. He studied Architecture at Greenwich University in the United Kingdom, from where he graduated in 1994. In 1995 he became a member of RIBA. He is also a member of Colegio de Arquitectos de Madrid (COAM) and the American Institute of Architects of New York City (AIA).

== Career ==
Vidal served as project director for the new Terminal 4 and Terminal 4S at Barajas Airport in Madrid, where he designed the terminal's distinctive colour strategy - a chromatic sequence running from red in the southern zone to blue in the northern zone, intuitively guiding passengers through the space. He was also the coauthor of the Warsaw International Airport in Poland.

In 2004 he opened his architectural practice in Madrid, luis vidal+architecs (LVA). He soon established a cooperation with Rogers Stirk Harbour + Partners (RSH+P) and both practices began collaborating in common projects such as Campus Palmas Altas in Seville (RIBA European Award 2010).

He was the lead concept architect of Heathrow Airport Terminal 2, which opened in June 2014 and was named the best in the world by Skytrax. Other projects of Vidal’s practice include several international airports in major U.S. cities including Pittsburgh, Boston and Dallas. In the Dominican Republic, Vidal renovated the International Americas Airport (AILA). In Chile, Vidal was responsible for the enlargement of the Arturo Moreno Benítez International Airport, which was awarded the Prix Versailles Prize in 2023.

Among his other works are the Zaragoza Airport (Spain), the new Álvaro Cunqueiro Hospital in Vigo (Spain), the Can Misses Hospital in Ibiza (Spain), the overhaul of the Castellana 77 Building (Spain) and the total renovation of the Colon Towers (Spain).

He worked with celebrated italian architect Renzo Piano on the futuristic Centro Botin in Santander, Spain. He is also the first Spanish architect to design a space port, Front Range, in Denver, Colorado, in association with HDR.

In 2006, luis vidal + arquitectos, in collaboration with Richard Rogers, won the international competition for the design of the Multi-Use Building at Madrid’s Campus of Justice. In 2014, Luis Vidal created a conceptual design for the home of the future for the Japanese company Sumitomo, called 2d-4d. It proposed a family living space that could be reconfigured, without the use of technology, to suit the needs of each moment.

luis vidal + architects, in collaboration with RSHP, worked on Madrid Nuevo Norte, the new urban transformation plan for the Spanish capital's northern area.

Vidal is currently developing other major infrastructure projects, notably the construction of the new Cibao International Airport in the Dominican Republic, and the project for the New Terminal One at JFK International Airport in New York (United States).

In April 2026, luis vidal + arquitectos was selected to lead the comprehensive renovation of Amsterdam Airport Schiphol, a project representing an investment of over ten billion euros. The studio will be responsible for redesigning the airport's iconic plaza as well as all terminals, retail areas, piers and boarding gates.

It has also been announced that luis vidal + architects will design Loewe's new Global Excellence Campus, located in the outskirts of Madrid. In Bilbao (Spain), Vidal is constructing the Anbotto Tower, a 35-story residential skyscraper.

Vidal is an Elected Member of the Industry Advisory Board of Columbia University’s Center for Buildings, Infrastructure and Public Space (CBIPS). He is also a member of the Industry Advisory Board at the Cranfield University in London.Vidal has been part-time lecturer at the Escuela Técnica Superior de Arquitectura (ETSAM) of the Universidad Politécnica de Madrid. In 2013, Luis Vidal served as curator and organized an exhibition—titled Encounters—as part of the Spain–Japan Dual Year, held to commemorate 400 years of relations between the two countries. In 2023, Luis Vidal received the FCARM Medal at the International Conference of the American Institute of Architects held in Mexico.

In 2013, the book From Process to Results, written by anthropologist Clare Melhuish, was published. It examines the firm’s contribution to rethinking hospital and airport typologies, in particular. The book was updated and republished in 2018. In 2024, in collaboration with Philip Jodidio, the book "Expect the Unexpected" was published, showcasing some of Luis Vidal's most amazing airport, health & sciences and corporate designs around the world.

== Most Known Works ==
- Terminal E at Logan International Airport. Boston, United States (2019-2023)
- Pittsburgh International Airport New Terminal. Pittsburgh. U.S. (2025)
- New Colon Towers (renovation), Madrid, Spain (2024)
- International Airport of the Americas (AILA) (renovation), Santo Domingo, Dominican Republic (2018-2022)
- Arturo Moreno Benítez International Airport (enlargement), Santiago, Chile (2015-2022)
- Community Center + CESFAM Matta Sur. Santiago, Chile (2015-2021)
- Loyola University Campus. Seville. Spain (2015-2019)
- Castellana 77 offices. Madrid. Spain (2015-2017)
- Botín Art Center (with RPWB). Santander, Spain
- New Hospital Álvaro Cunqueiro. Vigo, Spain (2010-2015)
- Terminal 2 at Heathrow Airport. London, United Kingdom (2008-2014)
- Can Misses Hospital. Ibiza, Spain (2008-2014)
- Eloy Gonzalo 10 Building refurbishment. Madrid, Spain (2014)
- Fit out Campus Palmas Altas (Sevilla). Seville. Spain. (with RSHP) (2008-2012)
- Campus Palmas Altas offices. Seville, Spain (con RSHP) (2005-2009)
- Abengoa Bridge. Seville, Spain (with RSHP) (2009)
- Zaragoza Airport. Zaragoza, Spain (2005-2008)
- Infanta Leonor Hospital. Madrid, Spain (2005-2007)
- Fit out MNCARS Restaurant. Madrid, Spain (2004-2005)

== Underway projects ==
- Terminal One JFK International Airport, New York, United States
- Schipol International Airport, Amsterdam, The Netherlands
- Loewe's Global Excellence Campus, Madrid, Spain
- Anbotto Tower, Bilbao, Spain
- Pensacola International Airport, Florida, United States
- Fit Out Castellana, 33 Building, Madrid, Spain
- Cibao International Airport, Santo Domingo, Dominican Republic
- Madrid Nuevo Norte Urban Transformation Plan, Madrid, Spain
