= Colorado Air and Space Port =

Airport in Colorado, United States

- Logo
- IATA: none; ICAO: KCFO; FAA LID: CFO

Summary
- Airport type: Public
- Owner: Adams County
- Operator: Colorado Air and Space Port
- Serves: Denver-Aurora-Lakewood, CO Metropolitan Statistical Area
- Location: Adams County, Colorado
- Elevation AMSL: 5,515 ft (1,681 m)
- Coordinates: 39°47′07″N 104°32′35″W
- Website: coloradoairandspaceport.com

Map
- Location of airport in Colorado / United States CFO (the United States)

Runways
Direction	Length		Surface
Direction	ft	m	Surface
8/26	8,002	2,439	Asphalt
17/35	8,000	2,438	Asphalt

Statistics (2019)
- Aircraft operations: 75,647
- Based aircraft: 292
- Source: Federal Aviation Administration and airport's web site

Colorado Air and Space Port (ICAO: KCFO, FAA LID: CFO), formerly known as Front Range Airport, is a public airport located in unincorporated Adams County, Colorado, in the United States, adjacent to Aurora and six miles (9.7 km) southeast of Denver International Airport (ICAO: KDEN, FAA LID: DEN). Colorado Air and Space Port serves the Denver-Aurora-Lakewood, CO Metropolitan Statistical Area. The postal designation of Watkins, a nearby unincorporated community, is used in the airport's mailing address.

Colorado Air and Space Port ICAO/FAA identifiers are KCFO/CFO. The airport has no IATA designation.

Colorado Air and Space Port is a small general aviation airport, although increased demand has warranted several expansion programs in recent years. Currently, the airport serves as the base of a few flying schools, flight clubs, maintenance services, and air rescue training facilities. Due to its location on the flat plains of eastern Colorado, as well as generally cheaper aircraft rental rates, it is a very popular airport for both flight training and recreational flights. It is also popular among owners and pilots of kit-built aircraft, and the Experimental Aircraft Association (EAA) has a very strong presence at Colorado Air and Space Port, which frequently hosts the EAA Young Eagles Rallies.

In 2011, the State of Colorado applied to the FAA to certify Colorado Air and Space Port as a spaceport; the application was approved in 2018.

== History ==
Front Range Airport (ICAO: KFTG, FAA LID: FTG) opened in 1984 when the now demolished Stapleton International Airport (ICAO: KDEN, FAA LID: DEN) was the major air hub for the Denver metropolitan area. Until 2005, it was a non-towered airport without air traffic control (ATC) services when the tallest general aviation control tower in the United States (191 ft) was opened along with full ATC services. After 19 years as airport director, Dennis Heap left the airport board in August 2013, and was replaced in the late spring of 2014 by Dave Ruppel. The airport was originally owned by the Front Range Airport Authority (FRAA), continuing until January 1, 2014, when the FRAA was dissolved and the airport and all employees were folded into Adams County government as a department. Since then, the airport has seen a marked improvement in general aviation, air-taxi, military traffic as well as other air-based businesses, such as the helicopter-based businesses of Air Methods.

== Facilities and aircraft ==
Colorado Air and Space Port covers an area of 3,349 acres (1,355 ha) which contains two asphalt paved runways, 8/26 is 8,002 ft x 100 ft (2,439 x 30 m) and 17/35, measuring 8,000 by 100 ft (2,438 by 30 m).

For the calendar year 2019, the airport had 75,647 aircraft operations, an average of 207 per day: 98.5% general aviation, <1% air taxi and 1.4% military. At the time 292 aircraft were based at the airport, 247 single-engine, 38 multi-engine, 4 helicopters, 1 ultralight, and 2 jet aircraft.

The airport also houses an armory belonging to the Colorado Army National Guard. HHC, 5th Battalion, 19th Special Forces Group is based there. No military aircraft are based at the airport.

== Spaceport proposal ==
In October 2011, the governor of Colorado, John Hickenlooper, formally requested that the federal government designate Colorado a "spaceport state" and that the airport be designated a spaceport for suborbital horizontal takeoff flights (HTVL and HTHL). Spaceport designation would allow a facility offering suborbital tourism, travel, and cargo transport from one point to another on Earth. The Denver Post reported that "No vertical launches are planned at the Front Range, unlike most of the other eight certified U.S. spaceports. Instead, space planes — an emerging technology — will use regular runways and jet engines to take off and land, switching to rocket power above 50,000 feet."

Media sources in 2012 suggested that the Sierra Nevada Dream Chaser spaceplane might be used for suborbital spaceflights and that Colorado Air and Space Port might prove to be the preferred location, over Spaceport America in New Mexico. News reports indicated that the Colorado Air and Space Port proposal was gaining traction with political interests at the state and federal levels as well as with industry participants. One of those commercial interests was XCOR Aerospace, which was considering Spaceport Colorado as a candidate for HTHL operations with their Lynx rocketplane. However, XCOR announced in July 2012 that they would be moving their company headquarters and research and development activities to Texas, in part due to a significant set of financial incentives (US$10,000,000) offered to XCOR by the Midland Development Corporation (MDC) and the Midland City Council.

As of April 2012, Colorado state law granted "limited liability to spaceflight companies, allowing spaceflight participants who sign waiver forms to sue only if they are injured or killed as a result of a firm's 'willful or wanton disregard' for safety."

Spanish architect Luis Vidal produced an architectural concept for the new airport in 2013.

In December 2017, British aerospace company Reaction Engines began construction of a test facility at Colorado Air and Space Port for the development of its SABRE air-breathing rocket engine. By 2024 its operations ceased, but in 2025 Boom Technology announced it would move in to Reaction Engines' former space to develop and test its own supersonic jet engines.

The spaceport designation was approved in 2018.

In December 2020, Japanese aerospace company PD AeroSpace signed an agreement with the Air and Space Port paving the way toward test flights of high-altitude planes above the plains east of Aurora.

In October 2022 plans for Port Colorado, an industrial mixed-use development spanning 6,500 acres adjacent to Colorado Air and Space Port, were reported.

== Gallery ==
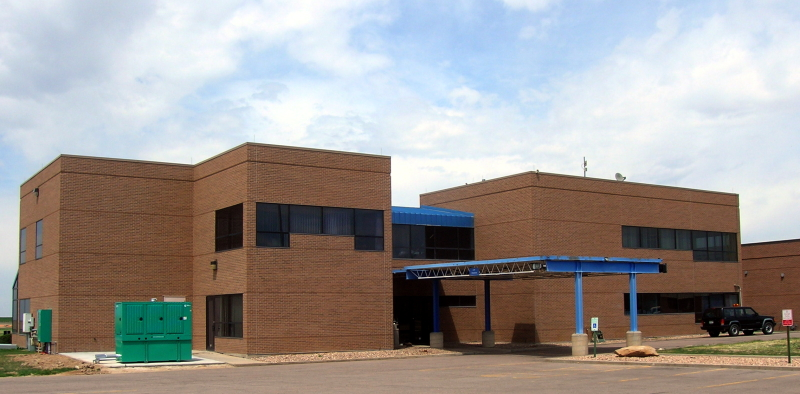
Main offices and terminal at Colorado Air and Space Port

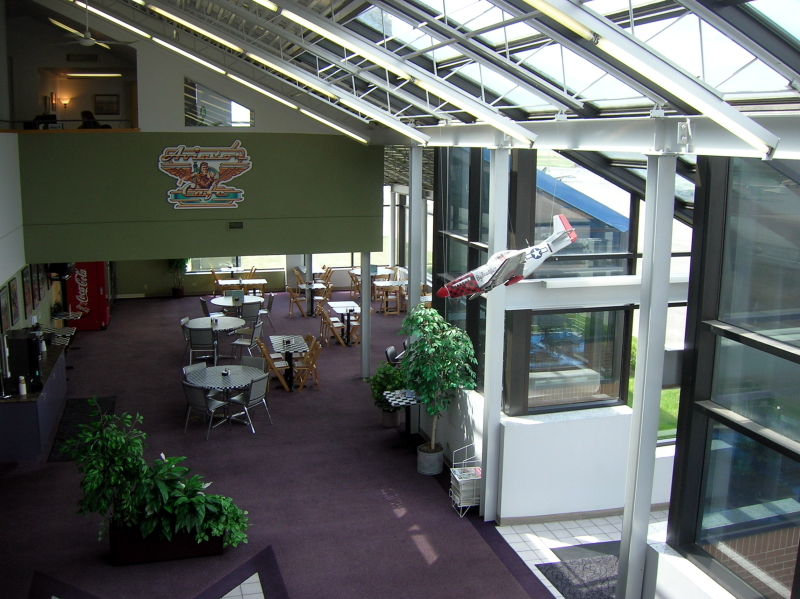
Interior view of the main offices and terminal facilities at Colorado Air and Space Port

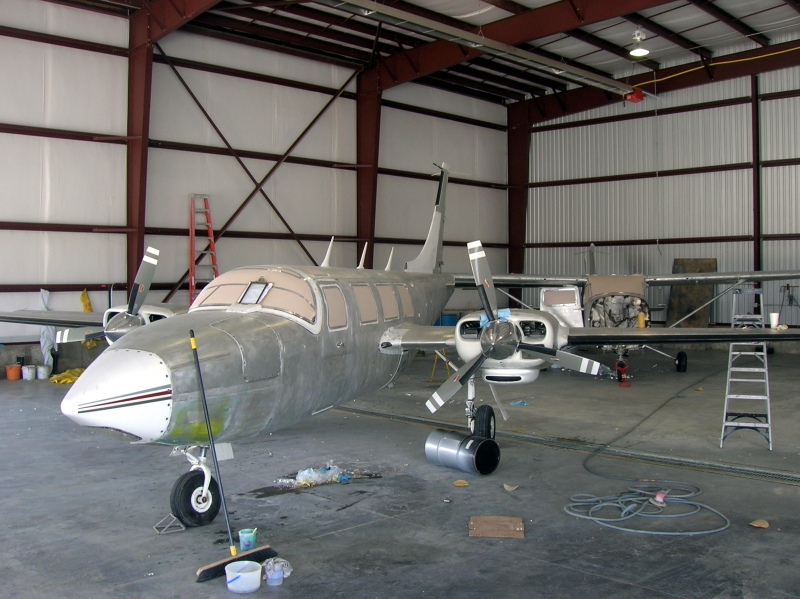
An aircraft getting stripped of paint in preparation for maintenance at Colorado Air and Space Port

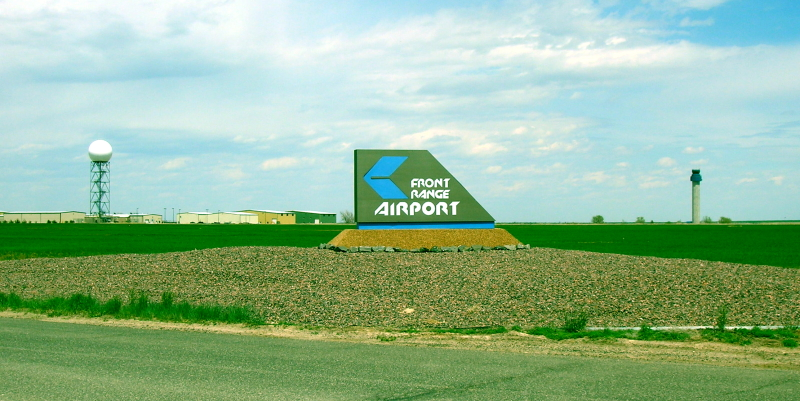
A view of the entrance to Colorado Air and Space Port

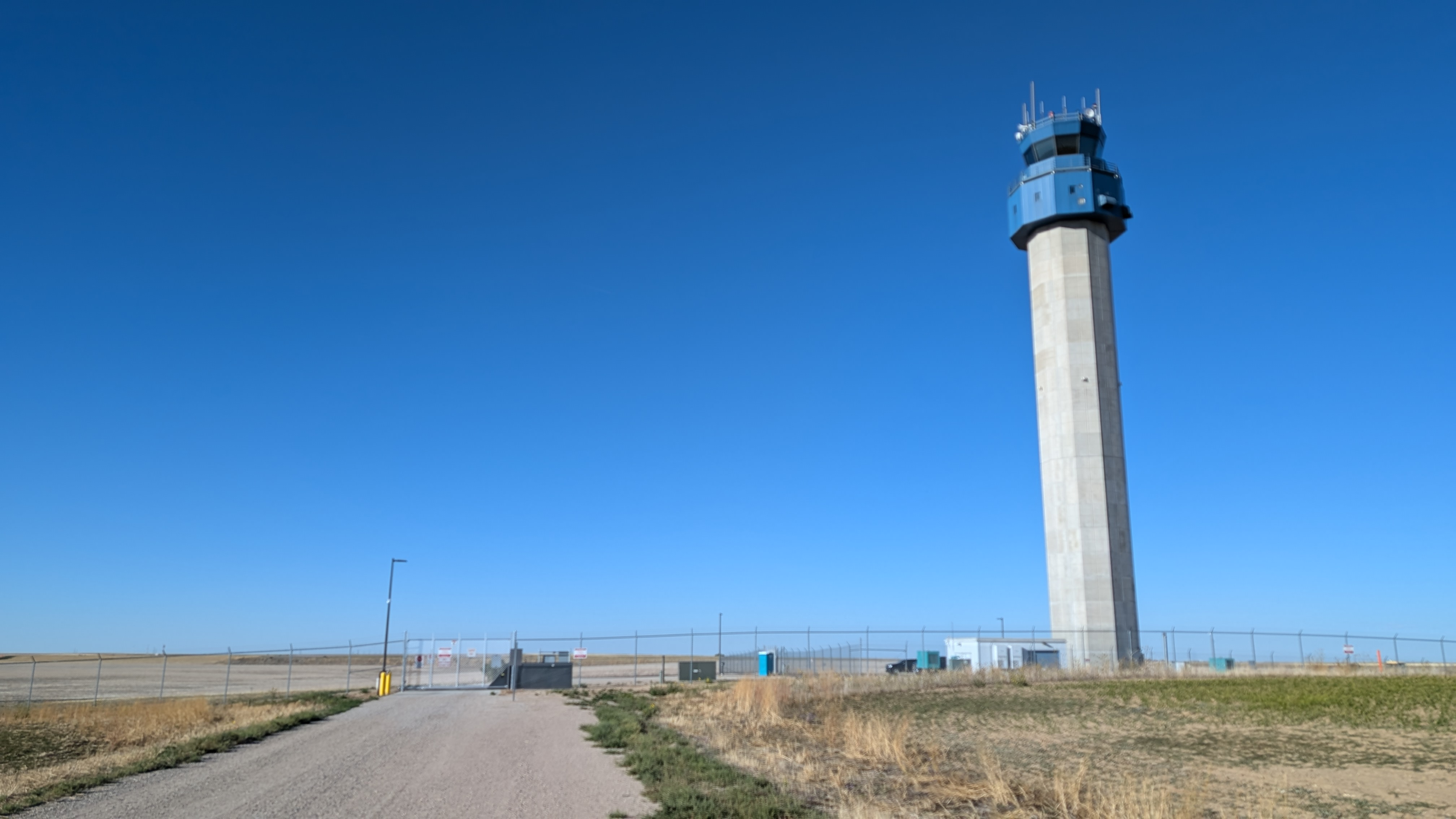
Colorado Air & Space ATC Control Tower KCFO, The Colorado Air and Space Port Air Traffic Control Tower (ATCT) is the tallest general aviation tower in the United States.

== See also ==
- List of airports in Colorado
