= Heathrow Terminal 3 =

Airport terminal at London Heathrow Airport

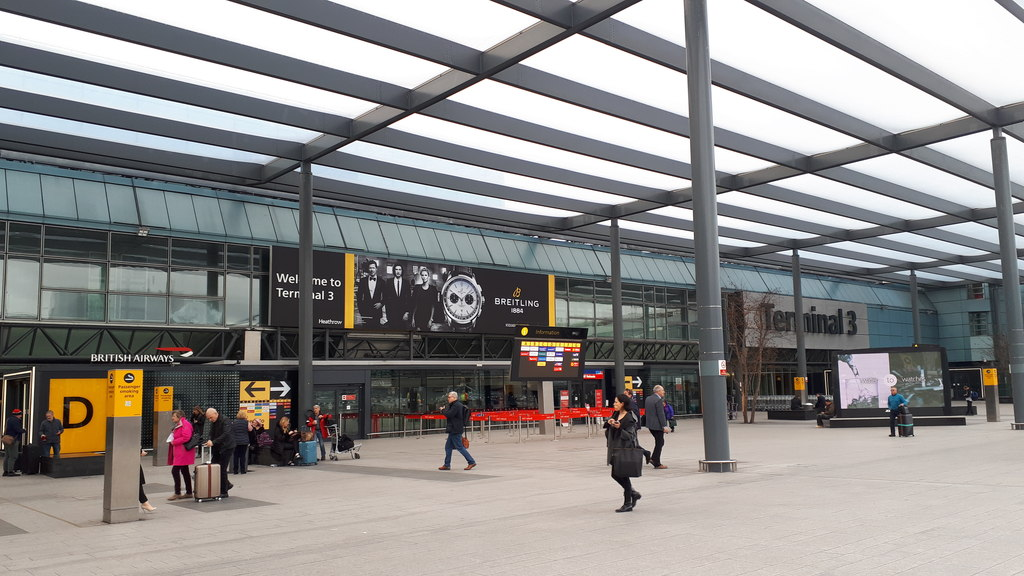
- Entrance to the departures area at Terminal 3

- Location within Greater London
- Alternative names: The Oceanic Terminal

General information
- Type: Airport terminal
- Coordinates: 51.470833°N 0.46°W
- Inaugurated: 13 November 1961
- Renovated: 1987–1990; 2007
- Client: Heathrow Airport Holdings

Other information
- Public transit: Heathrow Terminals 2 & 3 railway station; Heathrow Terminals 2 & 3 tube station; Heathrow Central bus station

Heathrow Terminal 3 is an airport terminal at Heathrow Airport, serving London, the capital city of the United Kingdom. Terminal 3 is currently used as one of the main global hubs of the International Airlines Group members British Airways (alongside Terminal 5) and Iberia since 12 July 2022. It is also used by the majority of members of the Oneworld and a few SkyTeam alliances along with several long-haul non-affiliated airlines. It is also the base for Virgin Atlantic.

== History ==
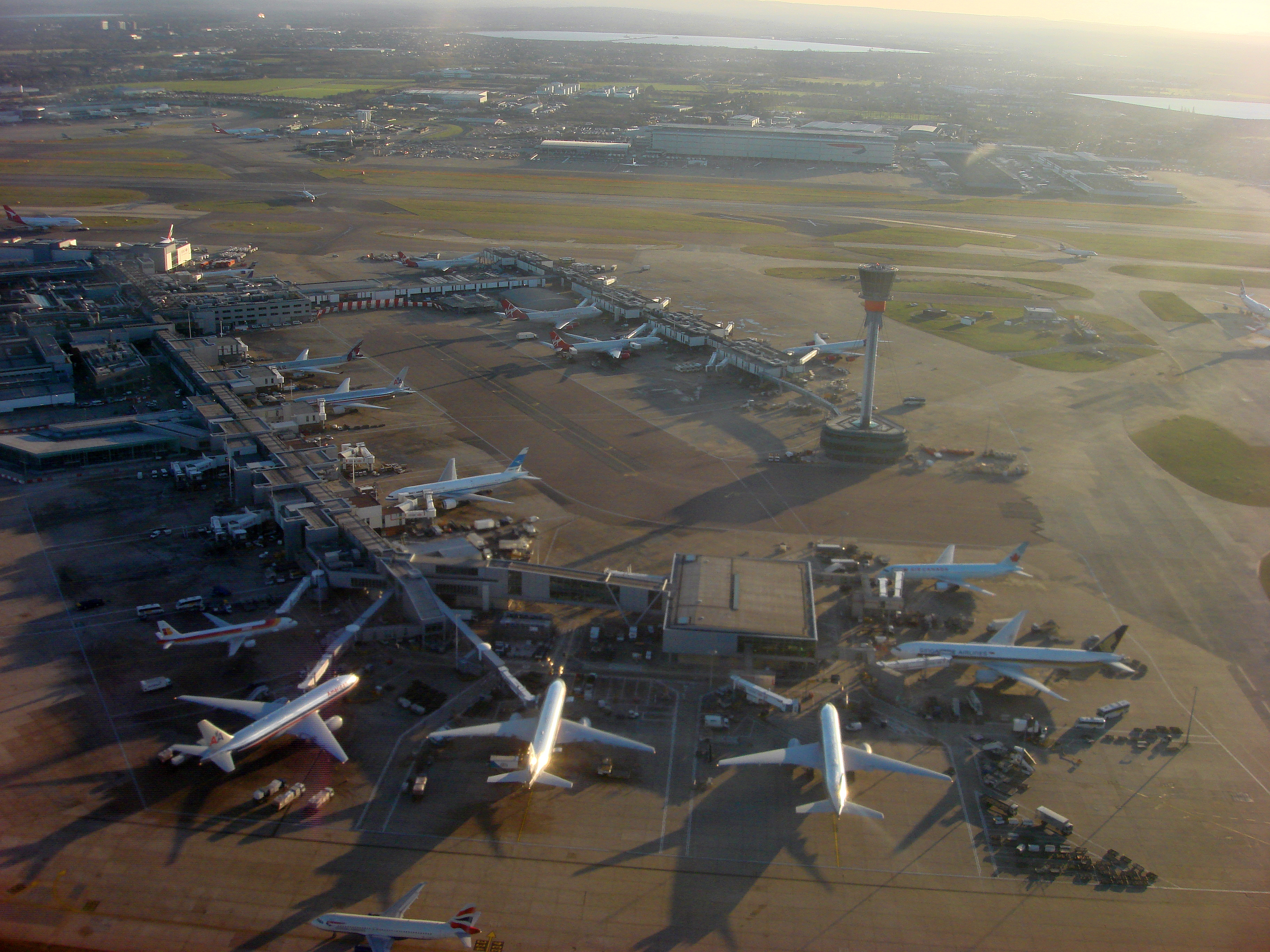
An aerial view of Terminal 3 at Heathrow Airport.

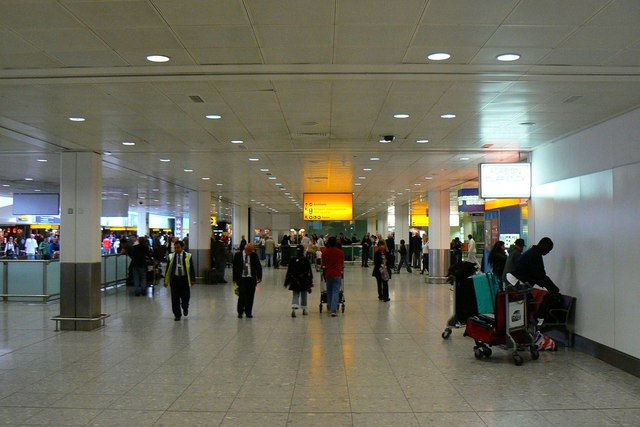
Terminal 3 arrivals area

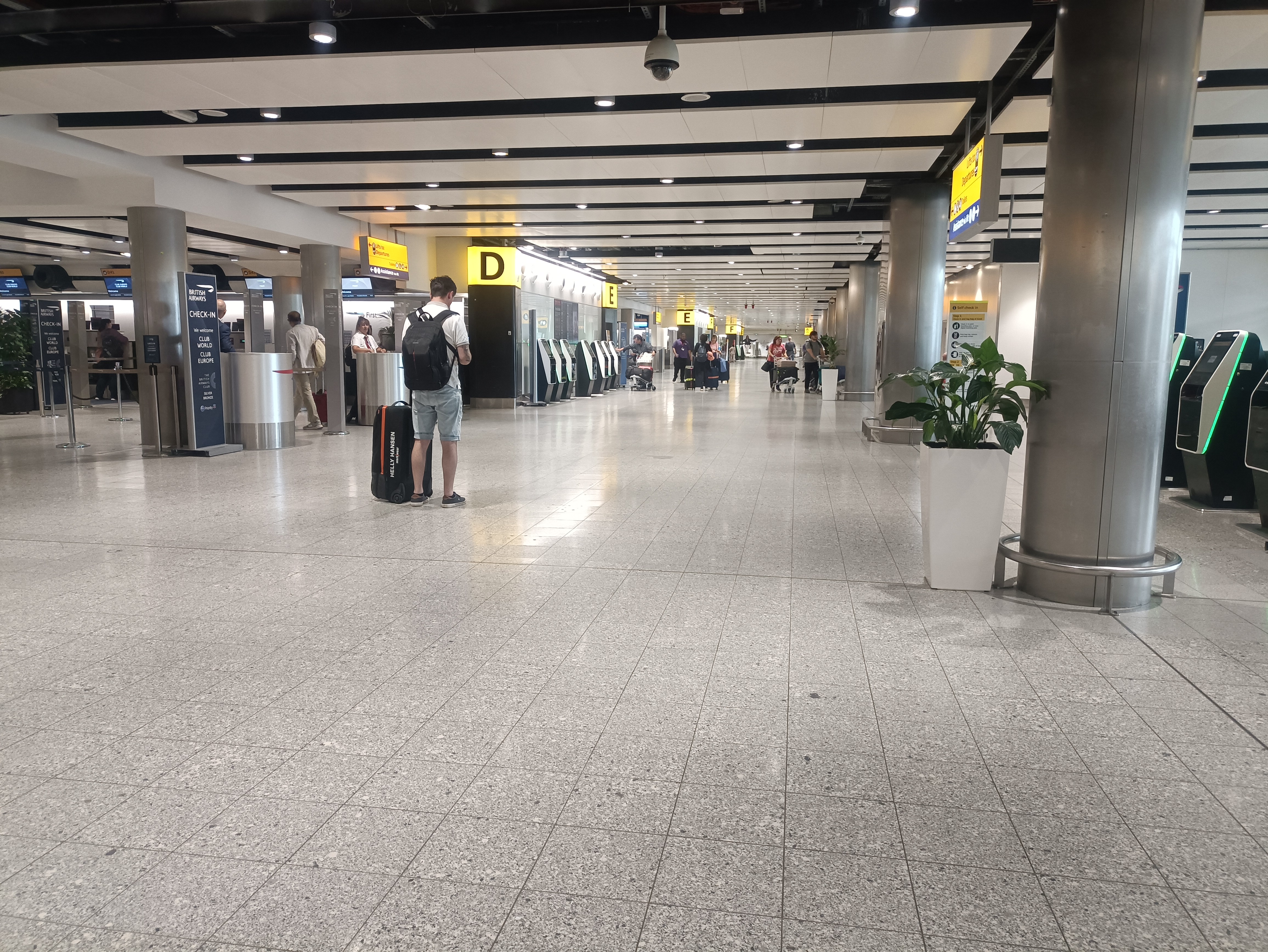
Terminal 3 departures area

Terminal 3 was opened as the Oceanic Terminal on 13 November 1961; it was built to handle flight arrivals and departures for long-haul routes. Renamed Terminal 3 in 1968, it was expanded in 1970 with the addition of an arrivals building. Other facilities added included the UK's first moving walkways. BOAC and the two US airlines, Pan American World Airways and Trans World Airlines (TWA), dominated operations at the terminal throughout the 1960s and 1970s. In 1969 the terminal was renovated to handle the new Boeing 747 which was introduced to the airport on 23 January 1970. In 1990 Pan American sold its Heathrow landing rights to United Airlines around the same time TWA sold theirs to American Airlines.

The terminal was refurbished between 1987 and 1990 at a cost of £110 million. In 2006, the new £105 million Pier 6 was completed to accommodate the Airbus A380 superjumbo; Emirates and Qantas now operate regular flights from Terminal 3 using the Airbus A380. Redevelopment of Terminal 3's forecourt through the addition of a new four-lane drop-off area and a large pedestrianised plaza, complete with canopy to the front of the terminal building, was completed in 2007. These improvements were intended to improve passengers' experiences, reduce traffic congestion and improve security. As part of this project, Virgin Atlantic was assigned its own dedicated check-in area, known as 'Zone A', which features a large sculpture and atrium. As of 2013, Terminal 3 has an area of 98,962 square metres (1,065,220 sq ft).

Heathrow Airport Limited also has plans for a £1 billion upgrade of the rest of the terminal over the next ten years which will include the renovation of aircraft piers and the arrivals forecourt. A new baggage system connecting to Terminal 5 (for British Airways connections) is currently under construction. In addition to the baggage system, the baggage claim hall is also set to undergo changes with dedicated A380 belts and an improved design and layout.

In 2020 due to the COVID-19 pandemic, all flights from Terminal 3 and 4 were suspended and flights temporarily moved to Terminals 2 and 5. The railway and tube station remained open to serve Terminal 2. The terminal was reopened for use by Virgin Atlantic and Delta on 15 July 2021.

== Usage ==
The main presence in Terminal 3 is Virgin Atlantic. American Airlines, British Airways, Cathay Pacific, Delta Air Lines, Emirates and Qantas are the other major users of the terminal. This terminal is mainly reserved for long-haul flights. British Airways and Finnair are the only short-haul airlines flying from this terminal. With the closure of Terminal 4 Air France and KLM operated from Terminal 3 during the downturn in traffic at the airport during the pandemic. Both airlines moved back to join their fellow SkyTeam members at the reopened Terminal 4 in March 2023.

=== Oneworld ===
Terminal 3 is used by the majority of the members of the Oneworld airline alliance: American Airlines, Cathay Pacific, Finnair, Japan Airlines, Qantas, Royal Jordanian, and SriLankan Airlines. British Airways, which mainly uses Terminal 5, also offers some flights from this terminal. As of 12 July 2022, it is one of the global hubs of the International Airlines Group. However it is not used by Malaysia Airlines, Oman Air, Royal Air Maroc and Qatar Airways (all Terminal 4 only) or Iberia (Terminal 5 only).

=== SkyTeam ===
Four SkyTeam member airlines use Terminal 3: Aeromexico, China Airlines, Delta Air Lines and Virgin Atlantic. Delta moved all flights to Terminal 3 on 14 September 2016 to ease connections with partner Virgin Atlantic.

=== Non-aligned ===
The principal non-aligned airline is Emirates. The other non-aligned airlines include Beijing Capital Airlines, Iran Air and LATAM Brasil. During the pandemic, new airlines RwandAir and Vistara began flights from this terminal. On 19 March 2024, RwandAir announced that it would operate flights to and from Terminal 4.

=== Star Alliance ===
Today, no Star Alliance airlines use Terminal 3. Most Star Alliance airlines now use Terminal 2.

In the past, a number of Star Alliance airlines used this terminal: Air Canada, Air China, Air India, All Nippon Airways, EgyptAir, Ethiopian Airlines, EVA Air, Scandinavian Airlines, Singapore Airlines, Thai Airways, and Turkish Airlines.

== Ground transport ==
=== Inter-terminal transport ===
Terminal 3 is connected by an underground walkway to Terminal 2. Terminals 4 and 5 can be reached by the free Elizabeth line or Heathrow Express rail service. London Underground services can also be used to transfer to Terminals 4 and 5 (the former requiring a change of train at Hatton Cross) free.

In addition, numerous buses ply between the Central Bus Station (for Terminals 2 and 3) and the other terminals. However, using the train service is much quicker and easier for passengers with luggage.

=== Road links ===
As one of the two central terminals at Heathrow, it is linked to the M4 motorway via the M4 spur road and through a tunnel under the north runway.

=== Rail links ===
Terminal 3 is served by regular rail services from Heathrow Central and Heathrow Terminals 2 & 3 tube station. These stations, shared with Heathrow Terminal 2, are situated in the central terminal area and provide regular connections to other Heathrow terminals, to Central London, the London Underground network, and local destinations. As of 2022, services run from the early morning until approximately midnight.

- Heathrow Express (4 trains per hour) operates express train services between Heathrow Terminal 5 station and London Paddington. Services to London operate non-stop for a journey time of approximately 15 minutes. Free interchange is permitted between Heathrow Central and Heathrow Terminal 5.
- Elizabeth line (4 trains per hour) operates local stopping services to Abbey Wood via London Paddington. Services from London alternate calling at Heathrow Terminal 4 and Heathrow Terminal 5. Free interchange is permitted between all Heathrow airport stations via Elizabeth line. On completion of the project in 2023, Elizabeth line trains will also provide cross-London service between Heathrow and Shenfield in the east of London.
- Piccadilly line of the London Underground (up to 12 trains per hour) operates services to Cockfosters via Central London. Heathrow Airport stations are situated in London fare zone 6.

Additionally, RailAir coach services provide coach connections between Heathrow bus station (see below) and rail stations in Reading and Woking, with integrated ticketing available for continuing journeys to regional and long-distance destinations via the National Rail network.

=== Bus links ===
Terminal 3 is accessible to both bus and coach services from Heathrow Central bus station.

There are also several coach services operated by National Express operating to other London airports such as Gatwick, Stansted and Luton; and other cities in the United Kingdom.
