= Heathrow Terminals 2 & 3 railway station =

National Rail station serving London Heathrow Airport

Heathrow Terminals 2 & 3
- Heathrow Central
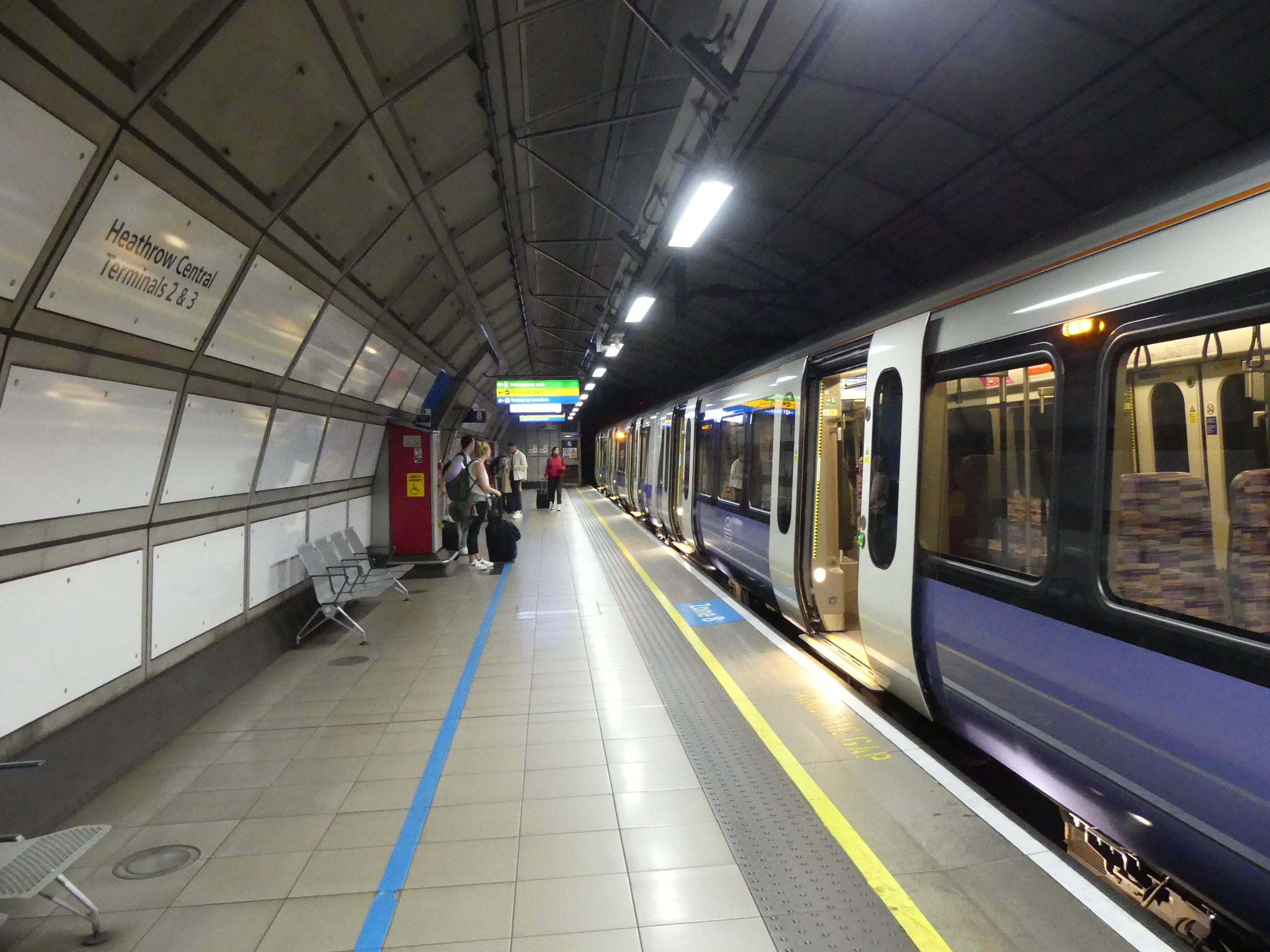
- Heathrow Terminals 2 & 3 railway station platform
- Interactive map of Heathrow Terminals 2 & 3

General information
- Location: Heathrow Airport
- Local authority: London Borough of Hillingdon
- Managed by: Heathrow Express
- Owner: Heathrow Airport Holdings
- Station code: HXX
- Number of platforms: 2
- Fare zone: 6 (Elizabeth line only)

National Rail annual entry and exit
- 2020–21: ▼0.142 million
- 2021–22: ▲1.268 million
- 2022–23: ▲4.393 million
- 2023–24: ▲6.884 million
- 2024–25: ▲7.939 million

Railway companies
- Original company: Heathrow Airport Holdings

Key dates
- 23 June 1998: Opened

Other information
- External links: Departures; Facilities
- Coordinates: 51.471°N 0.454°W

Heathrow Terminals 2 & 3 railway station (also known as Heathrow Central) serves Terminal 2 and Terminal 3 (and formerly Terminal 1 before its closure in 2015) at London Heathrow Airport.

It is served by Heathrow Express trains direct to central London and Elizabeth line trains that stop at local stations. It is 14 miles 50 chains (23.5 km) down-line from London Paddington.

Travelcards from Transport for London are not valid on Express services from the station, although they are valid on the Elizabeth line. Passengers transferring between any of the terminals at Heathrow may use the trains free of charge.

== Services ==
The station was opened on 23 June 1998 upon the completion of the Heathrow Express Rail Link linking Heathrow Airport with direct non-stop services to Central London. In contrast to the station at Terminal 5, the platforms at Heathrow Central do not lie adjacent to the London Underground Piccadilly line platforms at Heathrow Terminals 2 & 3 station. Instead they lie perpendicular, and at a far deeper level. This is because the railway line from Paddington was tunnelled into Heathrow from the north, whereas the Piccadilly line approaches from the east. Access to the station is reached via an underground pedestrian walkway which links Terminal 3 to the Central Bus Station and the Piccadilly line's Heathrow Terminals 2 & 3 station.

Trains towards Paddington use the Great Western Main Line, joining it at Airport Junction, just west of Hayes and Harlington. Elizabeth line trains continue beyond Paddington through new tunnels, stopping at stations in the West End and the City of London and on to either Abbey Wood in southeast London via Canary Wharf or, since May 2023, Shenfield on the Great Eastern Main Line.

As of the December 2023 timetable, the typical Monday to Friday off-peak service is:

- 4 tph (trains per hour) westbound to Heathrow Terminal 4 (Elizabeth line)
- 6 tph westbound to Heathrow Terminal 5 (2 tph Elizabeth line, 4 tph Heathrow Express)
- 4 tph eastbound to London Paddington (Heathrow Express)
- 4 tph eastbound to Abbey Wood (Elizabeth line, from Terminal 4)
- 2 tph eastbound to Shenfield (Elizabeth line, from Terminal 5)

=== Service table ===
Preceding station	Heathrow Express	Following station
Heathrow Terminal 5 Terminus	Heathrow Express	London Paddington Terminus
Preceding station	Elizabeth line	Following station
Heathrow Terminal 4 Terminus	Elizabeth line	Hayes & Harlington towards Abbey Wood
Heathrow Terminal 5 Terminus	Elizabeth line	Hayes & Harlington towards Shenfield

== Connections ==
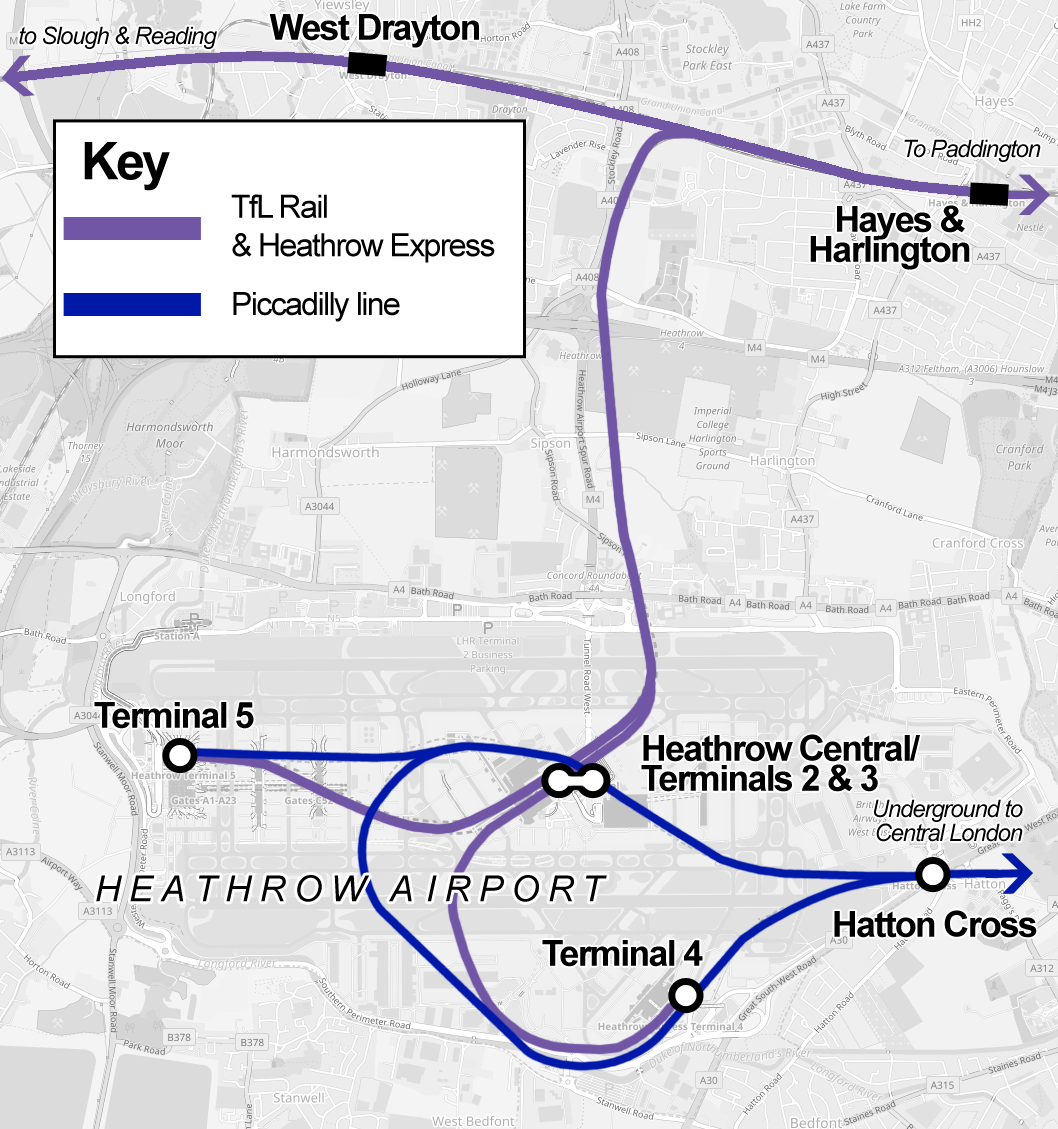
Heathrow Airport tube and rail stations

Heathrow Terminals 2 & 3 railway station is close to London Underground Heathrow Terminals 2 & 3 tube station where Piccadilly line trains run to Terminals 4 and 5 and to central London.

There are underground walkways connecting to Heathrow Central bus station, which has local and long-distance bus and coach services.

== See also ==
- Heathrow Terminals 2 & 3 tube station
- Heathrow Terminal 4 tube station
- Heathrow Terminal 5 tube station
