= Queens Building, Heathrow =

Office Building at London Heathrow Airport, opened in 1955, demolished in 2009

Coordinates: 51.471008°N 0.450214°W

Queens Building
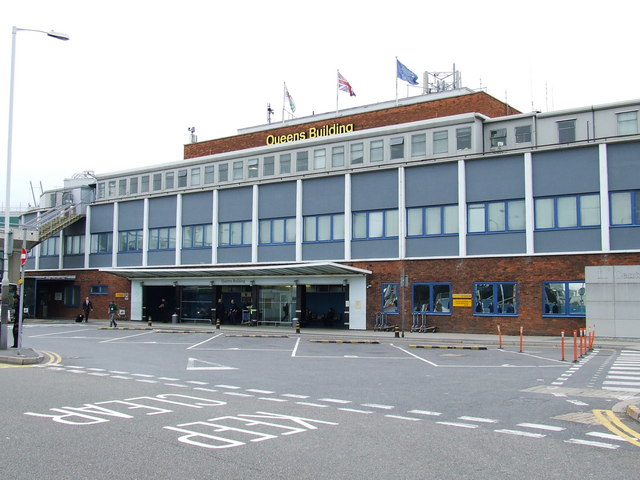
- Queens Building

General information
- Status: Demolished
- Location: Heathrow Airport, United Kingdom
- Named for: Queen Elizabeth II
- Opened: 1955
- Demolished: 2009
- Owner: BAA

Design and construction
- Architect: Frederick Gibberd

The Queens Building was an office building at London Heathrow Airport next to Heathrow Terminal 2. It was opened in 1955 by Queen Elizabeth II and was demolished in 2009 to make room for a rebuilt Terminal 2. It was the location of the operational offices of BAA until demolition.

== History ==
The Queens Building was built as part of a new central area for London Airport (as Heathrow was known at the time). It was designed in 1950 by Frederick Gibberd. Though it was initially going to be named "Eastern Apex Building", upon opening by Queen Elizabeth II it was announced it would be named the "Queens Building" after the Queen. The office buildings held the airport's administration, as well as airline offices and the only business and conference centre on airport property. In 1956, it was one of the most visited attractions in London due to its runway viewing platforms and rooftop gardens, open to the general public. It was a very popular location with plane spotters. The Queens Building was also constructed with an immigration detention facility designed for holding immigration offenders short-term for up to five days. This facility was in use until 1994 when a new immigration detention centre was opened at Cayley House on the Heathrow campus.

In 2005, BAA announced that the Queens Building would be demolished alongside the old Terminal 2 building before rebuilding Terminal 2. BAA chairman Sir Nigel Rudd said "The Queens Building has long sat at the heart of Heathrow, but the past must make way for the future...". Despite this, the Queens Building was expanded in 2006 to include new offices. All airlines gradually moved out and BAA moved their offices to the Compass Centre. Demolition started in 2009, with Terminal 2 flights being diverted to help facilitate the demolition.
