= Heathrow Terminals 2 & 3 tube station =

London Underground station

Heathrow Terminals 2 & 3
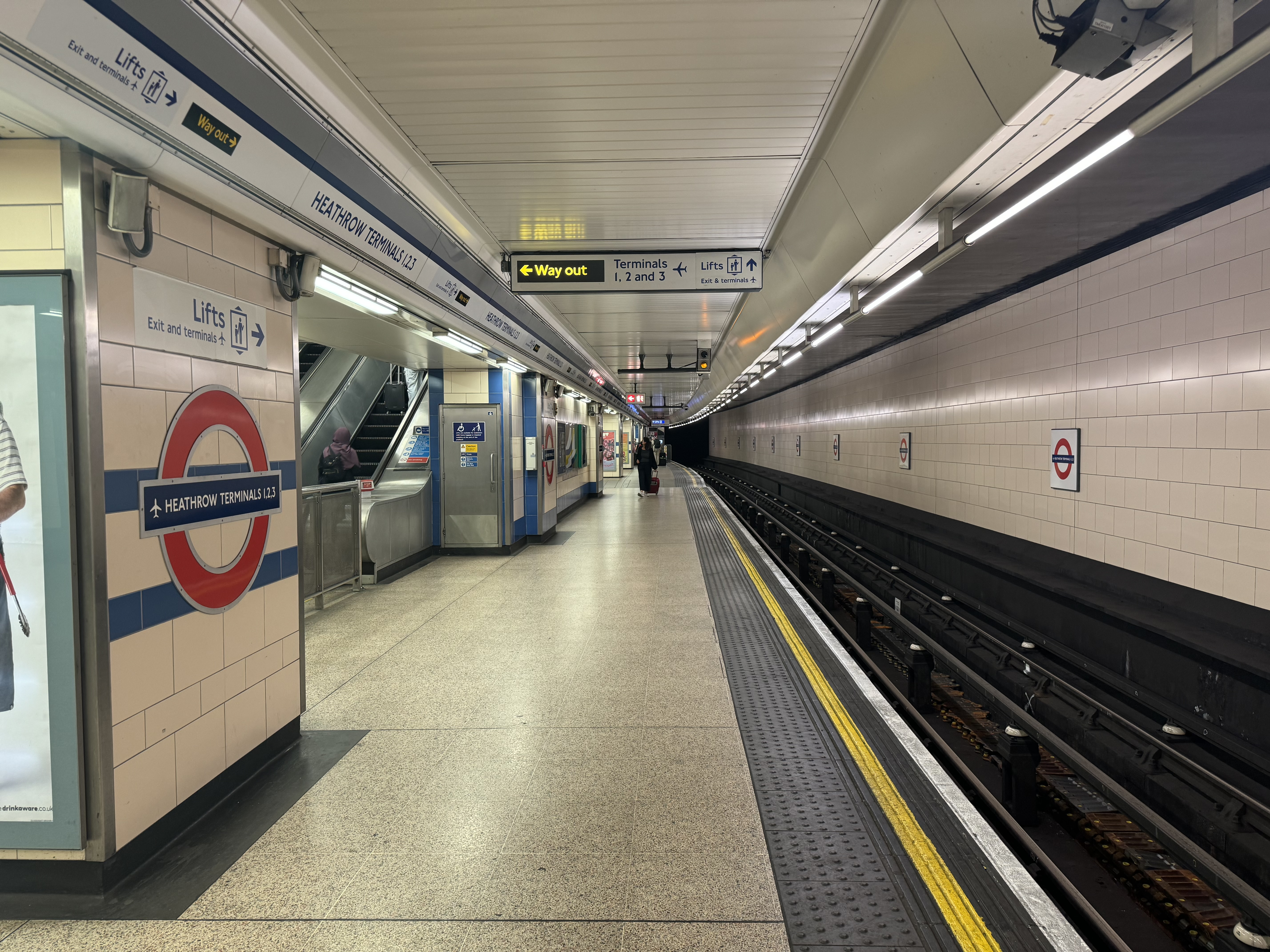
- Heathrow Terminals 2 & 3 tube station platform
- Interactive map of Heathrow Terminals 2 & 3

General information
- Location: Heathrow Airport
- Local authority: London Borough of Hillingdon
- Managed by: London Underground
- Number of platforms: 2
- Accessible: Yes
- Fare zone: 6

London Underground annual entry and exit
- 2021: ▲2.45 million
- 2022: ▲5.73 million
- 2023: ▼5.37 million
- 2024: ▲5.79 million
- 2025: ▼5.38 million

Railway companies
- Original company: London Transport Executive (GLC)

Key dates
- 16 December 1977: Opened as Heathrow Terminals 1,2,3
- January 2016: renamed Heathrow Terminals 2 & 3

Other information
- External links: TfL station info page
- Coordinates: 51.471°N 0.452°W

Heathrow Terminals 2 & 3 (formerly known as Heathrow Terminals 1, 2, 3) is a London Underground station at Heathrow Airport on the Heathrow branch of the Piccadilly line, which serves Heathrow Terminals 2 and 3. It is between Heathrow Terminal 5 and Hatton Cross stations. It is also next to Heathrow Terminal 4 station in a one-way operation. The station also served Heathrow Terminal 1 until its closure in January 2016. The station is situated in London fare zone 6, along with the nearby Heathrow Terminals 2 & 3 railway station served by Heathrow Express and Elizabeth line services.

== History ==
To cater to the rapid growth of road traffic to Heathrow Airport, several rail lines were considered to serve the airport. An average increment of 1 million passengers a year between 1953 and 1973, and rising issues with airline coach services from major terminals due to location, traffic congestion, larger aircraft capacity and increasing leisure travel further increased the need for public transport connections. Parliament considered two schemes, a spur of the Southern Railway from Feltham, and an extension of the Piccadilly line extension from Hounslow West.

An extension of the Piccadilly line to serve the airport was approved with royal assent as the London Transport Act 1967 (c. xxxix) and British Railways Act 1967 (c. xxx) respectively on 27 July 1967. Partial government funding was obtained in April 1972 for the 3.5 mi (5.6 km) Piccadilly line extension, and the estimated cost of construction was £12.3 million. Construction of the extension began on 27 April 1971, with a groundbreaking by Sir Desmond Plummer, leader of the Greater London Council. On 19 July 1975, the line was extended to Hatton Cross as an interim terminus, built by W. & C. French.

Construction of the route for Terminals 2 and 3 was by John Mowlem for £2.25m, being 1.25 miles, starting in early 1972.

The station was opened as Heathrow Central by Queen Elizabeth II on 16 December 1977. At its opening, the station served as the terminus of what became known as the Heathrow branch of the line – previously it had been the Hounslow branch.

With the development of the airport's new Terminal 4 underway for which a separate Underground station would be provided, the station was initially renamed Heathrow Central Terminals 1, 2, 3 from 3 September 1983, then renamed Heathrow Terminals 1, 2, 3 on 6 October 1986. After the closure of Heathrow Terminal 1 in June 2015, in January 2016 the station was renamed to Heathrow Terminals 2 & 3; however, as of December 2023 signage on the platform still says "Heathrow Terminals 1, 2, 3".

The Terminal 4 station is located on a unidirectional single track loop from Hatton Cross to Heathrow Heathrow Terminals 2 & 3. On the opening of the Terminal 4 station, most direct services from Hatton Cross to Terminals 2 & 3 ceased, with most Piccadilly line trains going first to Terminal 4. This meant that the westbound tunnel direct from Hatton Cross to Terminals 2 & 3 was little-used from 1986 to 2008. However, some early morning trains still went directly to Heathrow Terminals 2 & 3.

For the construction of the tunnel to the new Heathrow Terminal 5 station, the loop track and Terminal 4 station closed temporarily on 7 January 2005 and Heathrow Terminals 1, 2, 3 once again became the terminus of the line, with two way working into the station as had been the case prior to 1986. This situation continued until 17 September 2006, when the Terminal 5 tunnel works were sufficiently complete for the loop tunnel and Terminal 4 station to reopen.

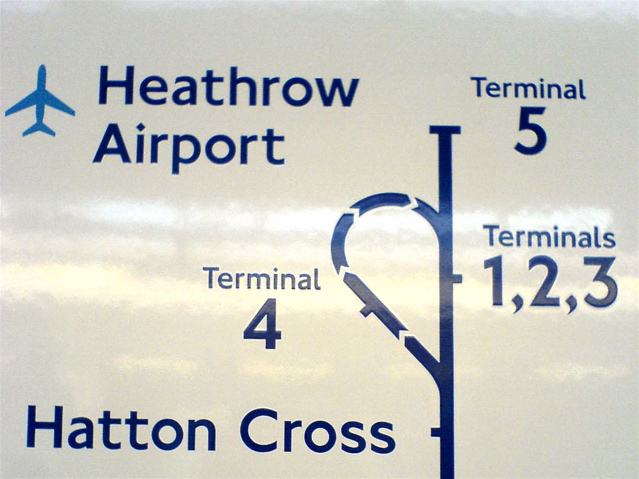
Part of a Piccadilly route map sign showing the stations at Heathrow

Heathrow Terminal 5 station opened on 27 March 2008, but the frequency of trains on the Heathrow branch of the Piccadilly line remained the same as previously, with services from Hatton Cross to Heathrow split. Alternate trains run either to Terminal 4 (around the loop and back to Central London via Terminals 2 & 3), or direct to Terminals 2 & 3 and Terminal 5.

Heathrow Terminals 2 & 3 has a double crossover immediately to the east which can be seen from the platform. This is used to allow trains to enter either platforms 1 or 2 heading westbound to terminate here. It is used for the last Heathrow service of the day Monday to Saturday and during times of service disruption. Also, a short distance to the west, are two further crossovers where the single track loop line from Terminal 4 rejoins the eastbound track from Terminal 5 to Terminals 2 & 3.

The station has six escalators of which two operate from the platform to the ticket hall area and two operate in the opposite direction; the other two connect the ticket hall area to the surface. A mezzanine floor between the platform and ticket hall levels provide staff accommodation and facilities. British Transport Police maintain a presence at Heathrow.

Until 2012, free transfer was not possible between terminals, in contrast to the Heathrow Express. In January 2012, free travel was introduced for Oyster card and contactless payment card holders between the Heathrow stations on the Piccadilly line. Journeys from Heathrow Terminals 2 & 3 or Heathrow Terminal 5 to Terminal 4 via the Piccadilly line require a change at Hatton Cross.

As of March 2012, the station had undergone renovation works which featured an extended control room, all six escalators refurbished, a station enhancement and two Step Free Access lifts from the ticket hall (located near the bottom of the escalators from street level) to the platforms. Step-free access to street level will continue to be served by the two airport lifts from the Coach station.

== Artwork ==
The station platforms feature an abstract mural of Concorde (the supersonic airliner) in vitreous enamel by artist Tom Eckersley. The current murals are replacements from the station renovation works carried out in 2012 when, due to a change of tiling colour, the murals were amended to show different colourways. The originals were donated in c.2018 by London Underground to various collections including the University of West London and the National Museums of Scotland.

== Services ==
Heathrow Terminals 2 & 3 station is on the Heathrow branch of the Piccadilly line in London fare zone 6. It is between Heathrow Terminal 5 to the west and Hatton Cross to the east. It is also next to Heathrow Terminal 4 in a one-way operation.

Preceding station	London Underground	Following station
Heathrow Terminal 5 Terminus	Piccadilly line Heathrow branch	Hatton Cross towards Cockfosters or Arnos Grove
Heathrow Terminal 4 One-way operation	Piccadilly line Heathrow branch	Hatton Cross towards Cockfosters or Arnos Grove

== Connections ==
The station is directly below Heathrow Central bus station, which offers both local buses and long-distance express coaches.

== See also ==
- Heathrow Terminals 2 & 3 railway station
