= Heathrow Terminal 4 tube station =

London Underground station

Heathrow Terminal 4
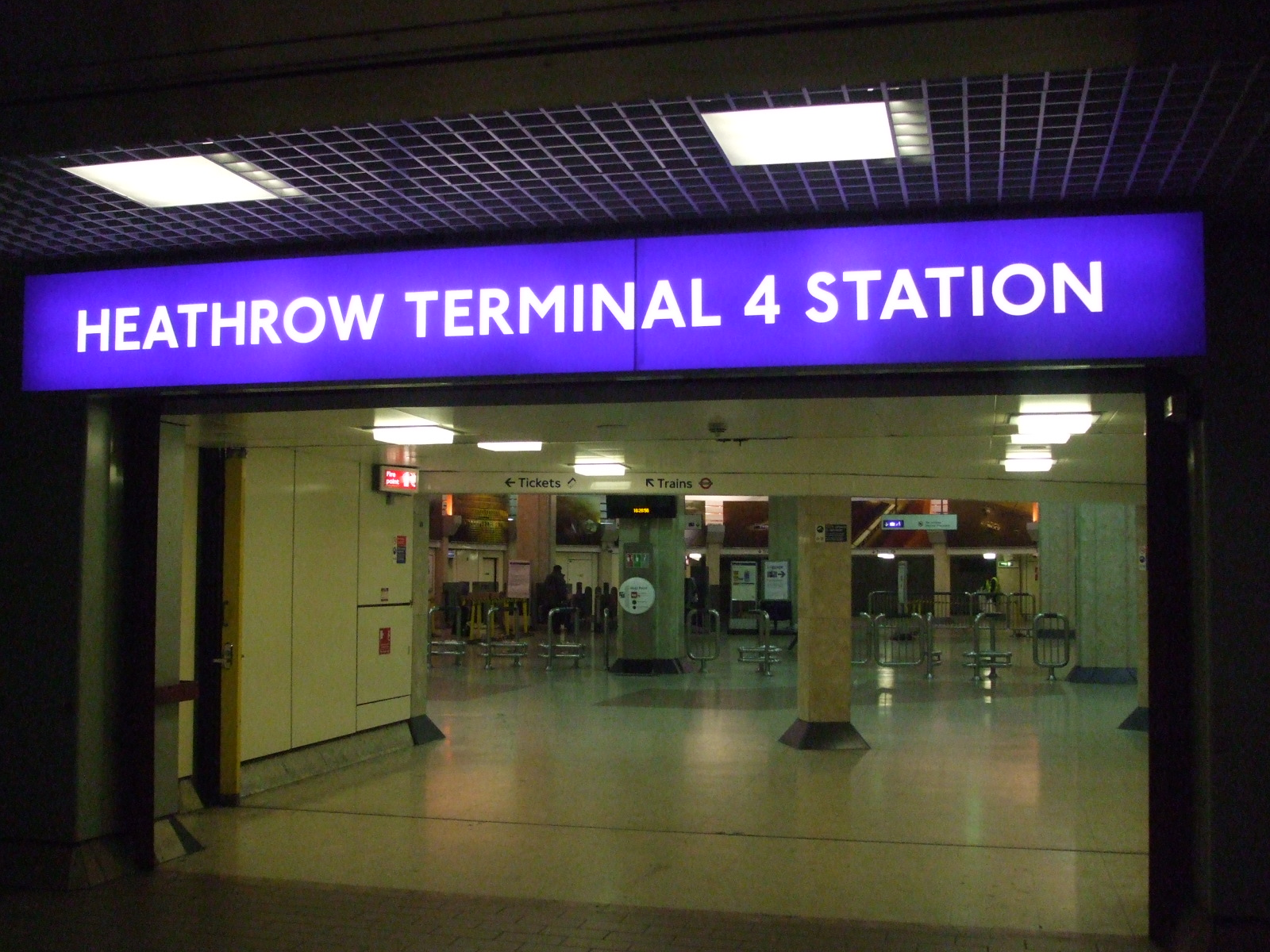
- Entrance from terminal
- Interactive map of Heathrow Terminal 4

General information
- Location: Heathrow Terminal 4
- Local authority: London Borough of Hillingdon
- Managed by: London Underground
- Owner: Heathrow Airport Holdings
- Number of platforms: 1
- Accessible: Yes
- Fare zone: 6

London Underground annual entry and exit
- 2021: 0.00 million
- 2022: ▲1.23 million
- 2023: ▲1.45 million
- 2024: ▲1.64 million
- 2025: ▼1.57 million

Railway companies
- Original company: London Regional Transport

Key dates
- 12 April 1986: Opened
- 7 January 2005: Temporary closure
- 17 September 2006: Reopened
- 9 May 2020: Temporary closure
- 14 June 2022: Reopened

Other information
- External links: TfL station info page
- Coordinates: 51.459°N 0.446°W

Heathrow Terminal 4 is a London Underground station at Heathrow Airport on the Heathrow branch of the Piccadilly line. The next stations are Hatton Cross to the east and Heathrow Terminals 2 & 3 in a one-way operation at the airport. It is in London fare zone 6.

== History ==
In 1979, approval for a fourth terminal at Heathrow Airport was granted. An extension of the Piccadilly line to serve the new terminal was agreed in October 1981. The station box would be built by the British Airports Authority as part of the £200 million construction cost of the new terminal. By 1982, construction of the fourth terminal building was behind schedule, and in July 1982 the location of the station was moved from below the terminal building to a nearby car park.

=== Construction ===
Construction began in February 1983. London Regional Transport funded the construction of 2.5 mi (4.0 km) of new tunnels, the track and the fit-out of the station, at a cost of £23 million. Construction was completed by November 1985. It was built by Balfour Beatty, and the ticket hall.

=== Opening ===
The station was officially opened by the Prince and Princess of Wales on 1 April 1986, before opening the Terminal 4 itself shortly afterwards. Trains, however, did not stop at the station until 12 April, when the new terminal started to handle flights.

The station is situated on a unidirectional loop tunnel which was constructed between the existing Hatton Cross and Heathrow Terminals 2 & 3 stations. The station is one of four on the London Underground with only one platform, and is the only one with one-way train service. It is adjacent to Heathrow Terminal 4 railway station used by Elizabeth line services that travel through the newer mainline tunnel.

In-service routing took trains from Hatton Cross to Terminal 4 then Terminals 2 & 3 and back to Hatton Cross. On 7 January 2005, both the loop track and the station were closed temporarily in order to allow the construction of a new rail junction to link to the new Heathrow Terminal 5 station. All trains reverted to using the original westbound track from Hatton Cross direct to Heathrow Terminals 2 & 3 which was used prior to the opening of Heathrow Terminal 4. For passengers travelling to or from Heathrow Terminal 4, a shuttle bus was provided from Hatton Cross tube station. This situation continued until 17 September 2006 when the loop line and station were reopened after construction finished, with new security and customer announcement technologies in place at the station.

== Current routing ==
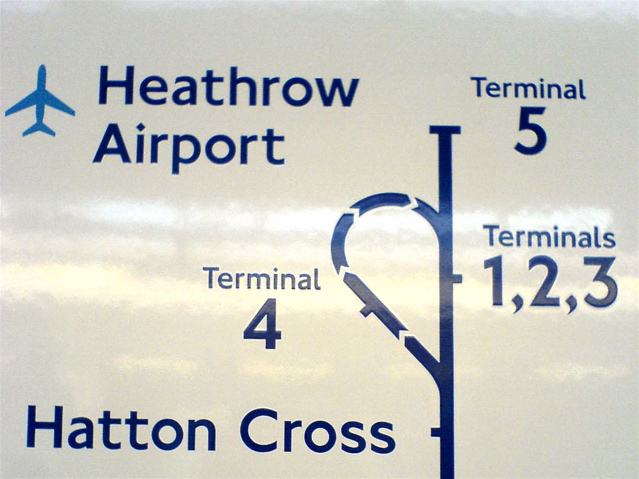
Terminal 4 is located on the clockwise loop on the left. Access to Terminal 4 from the other terminals via the free travel area requires a change at Hatton Cross.

Heathrow Terminal 4 tube station is located on a unidirectional clockwise loop that branches off after Hatton Cross westbound, and rejoins the Heathrow branch eastbound to the west of Heathrow Terminals 2 & 3.

Since the opening of Heathrow Terminal 5 station, alternate Heathrow branch trains run via the Terminal 4 loop, with the other alternate trains run directly to Heathrow Terminals 2 & 3, and Heathrow Terminal 5.

Until 2012, free transfer was not possible between terminals, in contrast to the Heathrow Express. In January 2012, free travel was introduced for Oyster card holders between the three Heathrow stations. But to travel from Heathrow Terminals 2 & 3 or Terminal 5 to Terminal 4 one must change trains at Hatton Cross. This journey is free with Hatton Cross itself being part of the free travel zone.

On 9 May 2020, Heathrow Terminal 4 station closed temporarily until 14 June 2022, due to the closure of the airport's Terminal 4 during the COVID-19 pandemic in London.

On 14 June 2022, this station reopened for passenger service.

== Connections ==
London Buses routes serve the station.

== See also ==
- Heathrow Terminal 4 railway station

Preceding station	London Underground	Following station
Hatton Cross One-way operation	Piccadilly line Heathrow branch	Heathrow Terminals 2 & 3 towards Cockfosters or Arnos Grove
