= Virgin Atlantic fleet =

List of aircraft operated by Virgin Atlantic

Virgin Atlantic operates a fleet consisting exclusively of wide-body twin-jet aircraft manufactured by Airbus and Boeing.

== Current fleet ==
As of August 2025, Virgin Atlantic operates the following aircraft:

Virgin Atlantic fleet
Aircraft	In service	Orders	Passengers					Notes
Aircraft	In service	Orders	J	W	Y	Total	Refs	Notes
Airbus A330-300	6	—	31	48	185	264		To be retired and replaced by Airbus A330neo by 2027.
Airbus A330-900	8	11	32	46	184	262		Replacing Airbus A330-300 by 2027. Additional order of 7 in July 2024.
Airbus A330-900	—	11	48	56	128	232		From Q3 2026, 10 deliveries will have premium configuration.
Airbus A350-1000	7	—	44	56	235	335		
Airbus A350-1000	5	—	16	56	325	397		
Boeing 787-9	17	—	31	35	192	258		14 aircraft to be retrofitted with premium configuration from 2028 to 2030. 2 aircraft to be transferred to LOT Polish Airlines in 2027.
Boeing 787-9	17	—	44	56	127	227		14 aircraft to be retrofitted with premium configuration from 2028 to 2030. 2 aircraft to be transferred to LOT Polish Airlines in 2027.
Total	43	11						

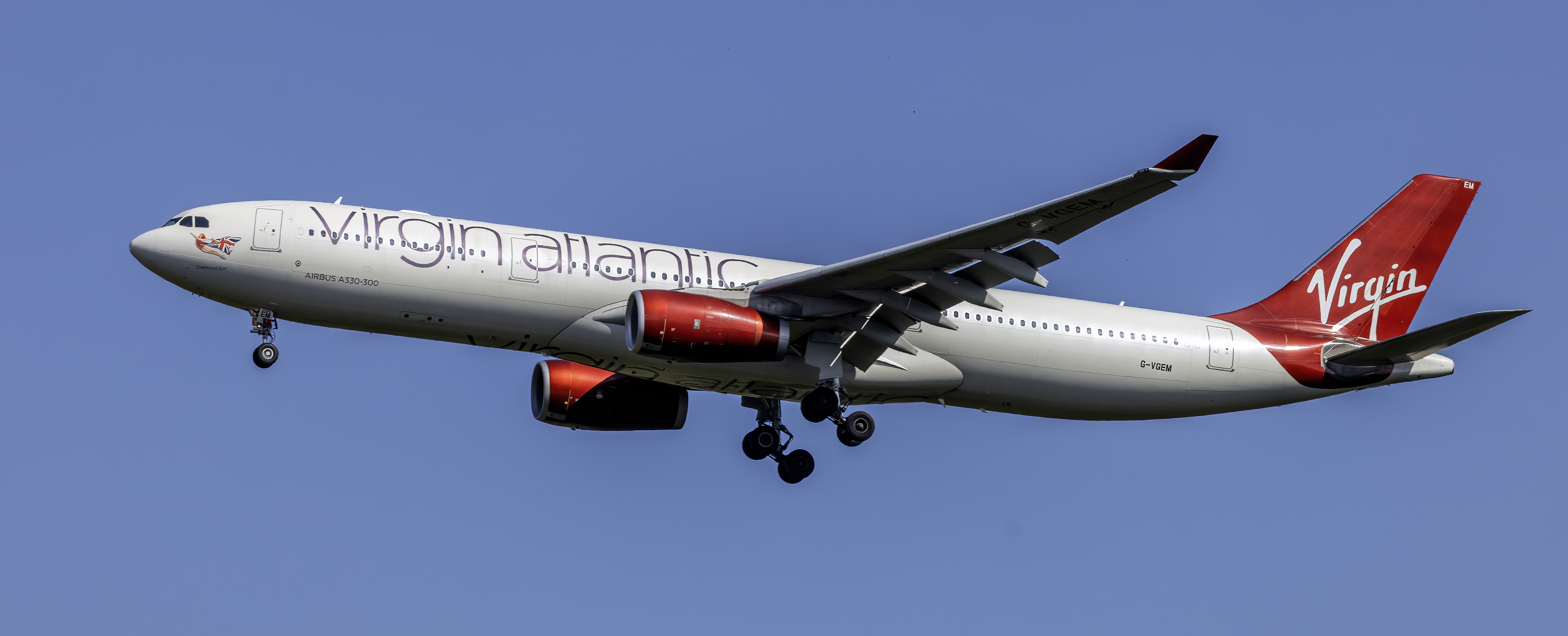
Airbus A330-300 Diamond Girl

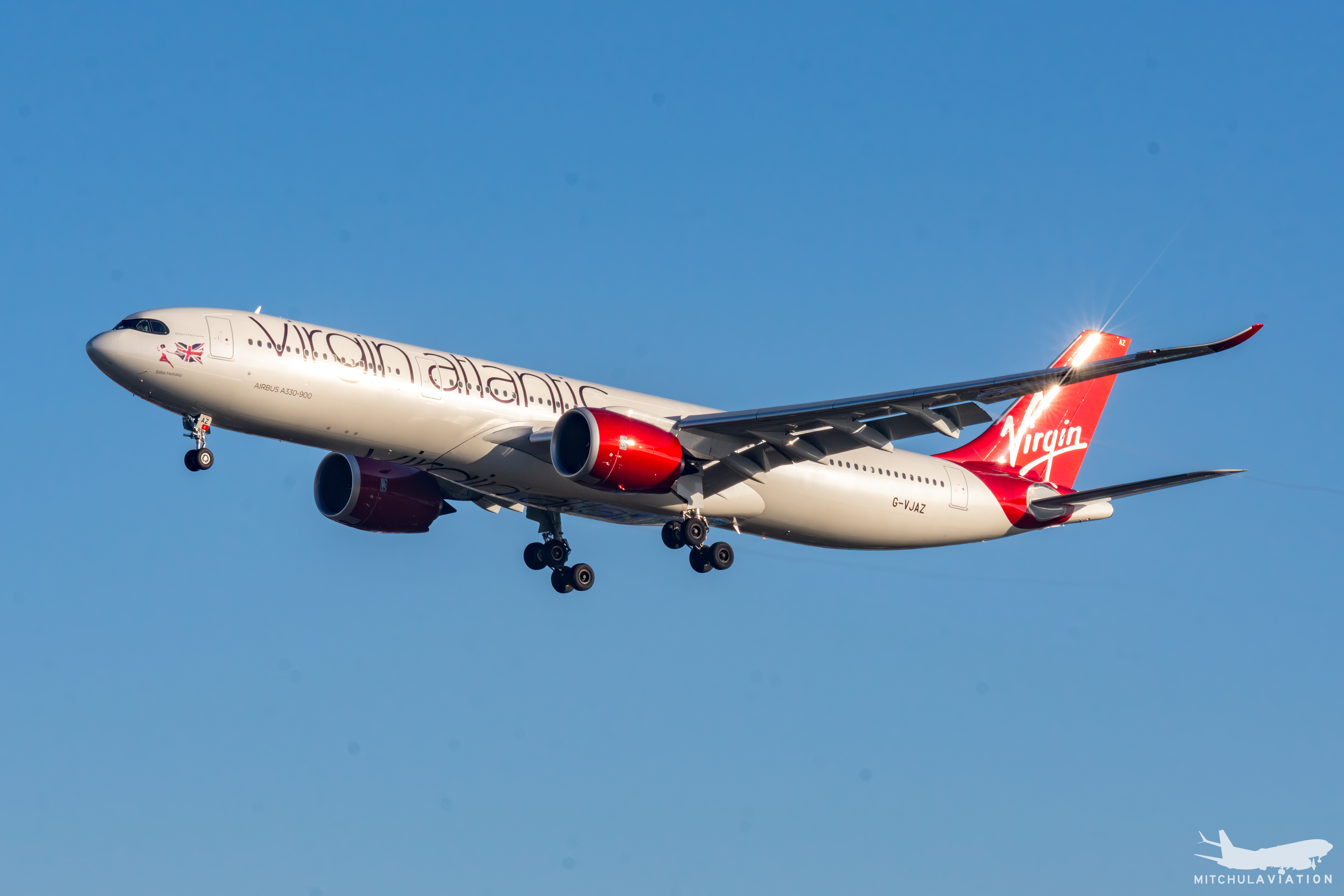
Airbus A330-900 Billie Holiday

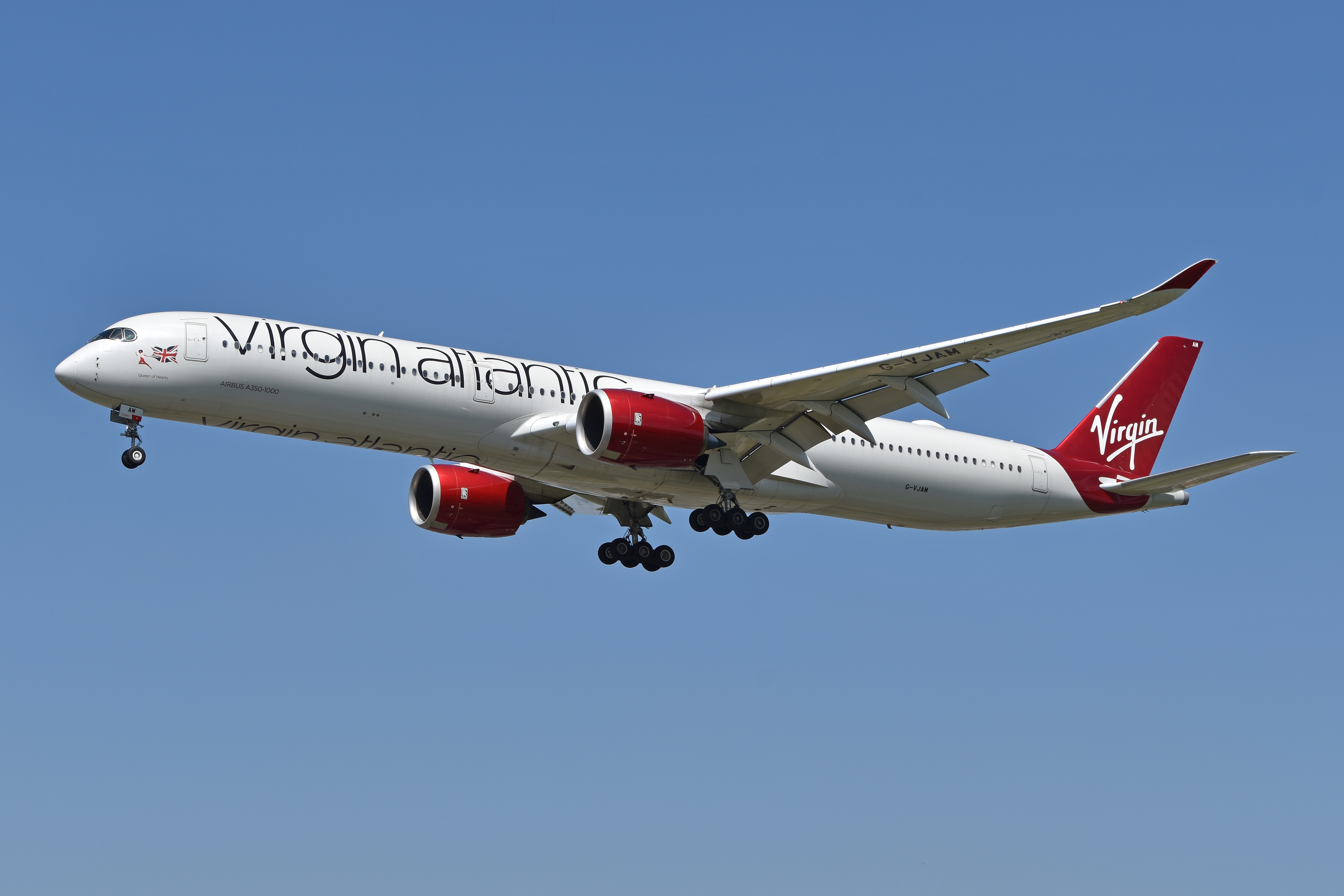
Airbus A350-1000 Queen of Hearts

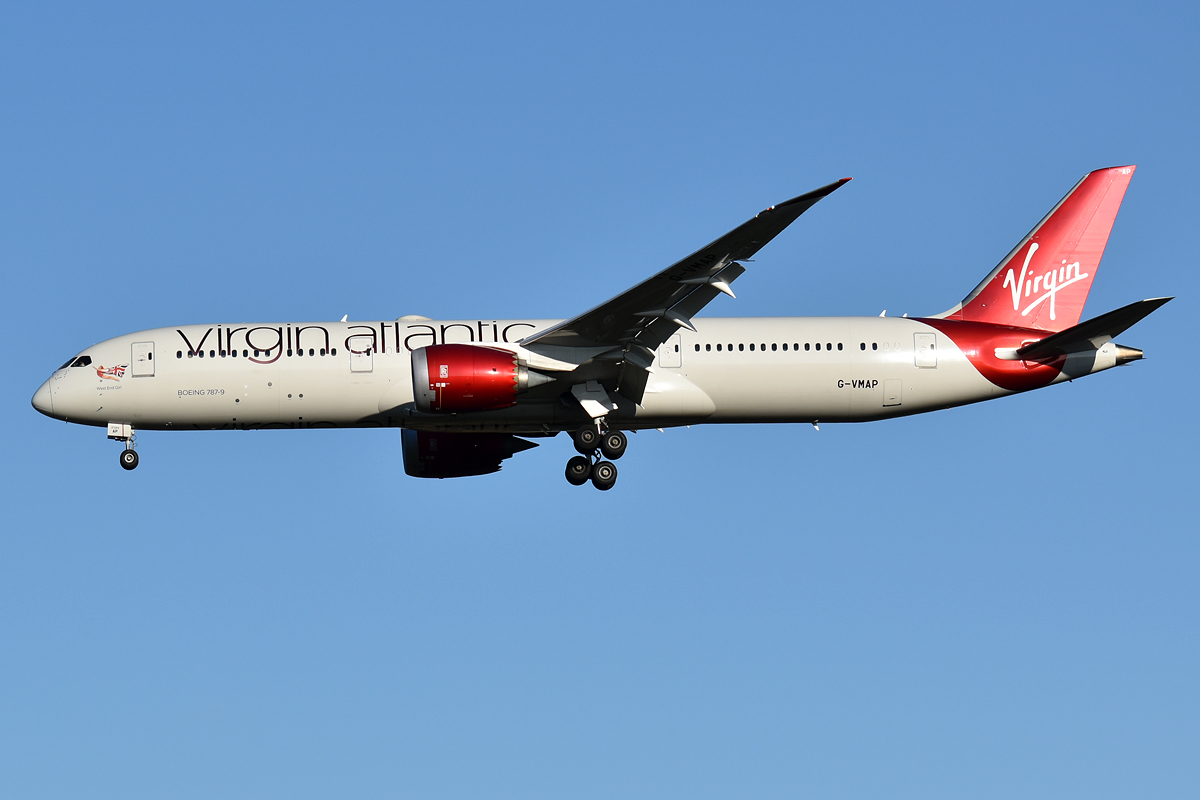
Boeing 787-9 West End Girl

== Historical fleet ==
Virgin Atlantic historical fleet
Aircraft	Total	Introduced	Retired	Notes	Ref
Airbus A320-200	2	1987	2000	1 leased for a London to Athens service; replaced by an A321-200 in 2000.	
Airbus A320-200	4	2013	2015	Leased from Aer Lingus for Little Red services.	
Airbus A321-200	1	2000	2001	Named Hellenic Beauty leased for a London to Athens service to replace an A320-200.	
Airbus A330-200	4	2018	2022	All four were refurbished former Air Berlin aircraft. Withdrawn from service early due to the COVID-19 pandemic in March 2020, exited the fleet in 2022.	
Airbus A340-300	10	1993	2015	Last commercial flight in April 2015.	
Airbus A340-600	19	2002	2020	Launch customer. Includes G-VATL, the third prototype. G-VNAP in 'Thank You' livery. Early retirement due to the COVID-19 pandemic, last commercial flight 8 March 2020.	
Boeing 747-100	1	1990	2000	Originally Miami Maiden, then renamed Spirit of Sir Freddie.	
Boeing 747-200B	14	1984	2005	G-VIRG was Virgin Atlantic's first aircraft.	
Boeing 747-400	13	1994	2020	Early retirement due to the COVID-19 pandemic, last commercial flight 31 March 2020.	
Boeing 767-300ER	1	1996	1997	Wet-leased from Martinair due to aircraft shortage, serving Manchester-Orlando.	

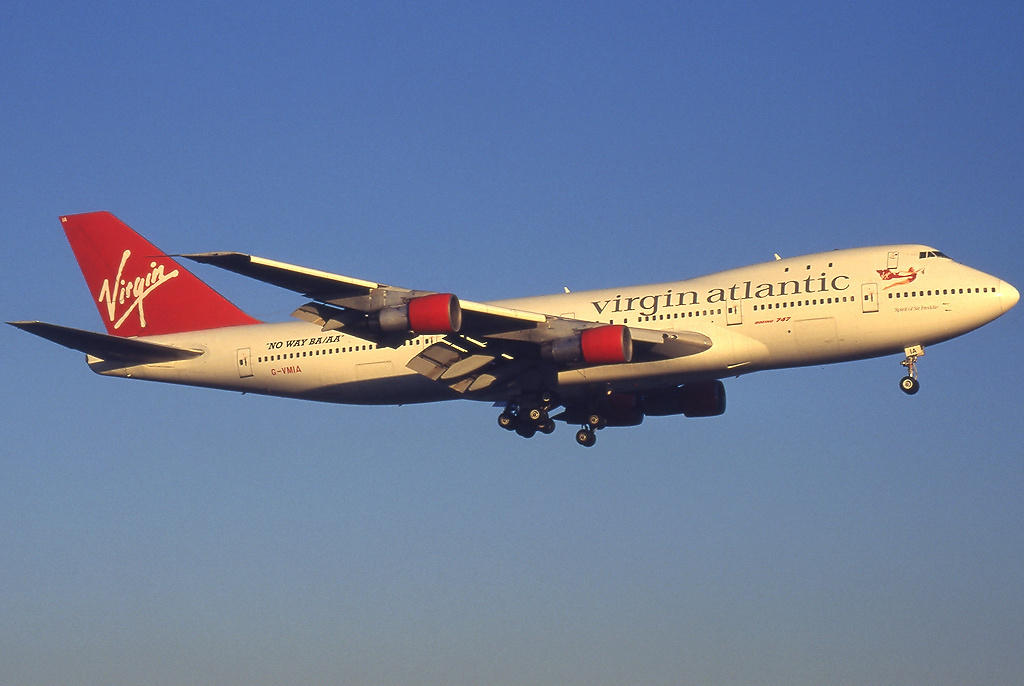
Boeing 747-100 Spirit of Sir Freddie marked with "No Way BA/AA" protest in 1997

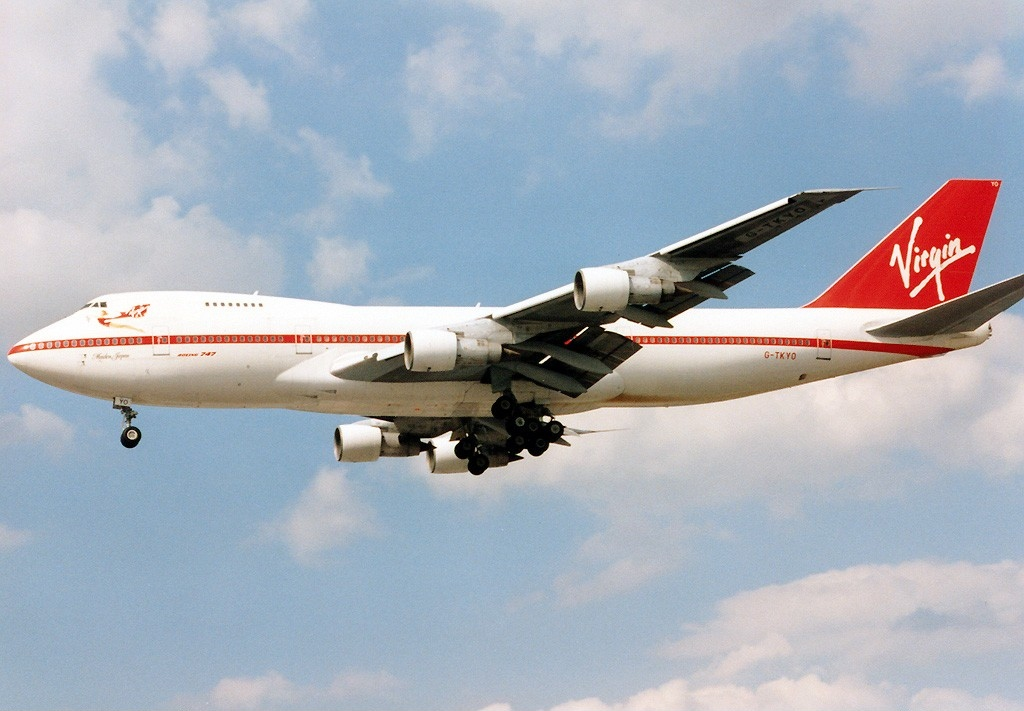
Boeing 747-200 in 1994

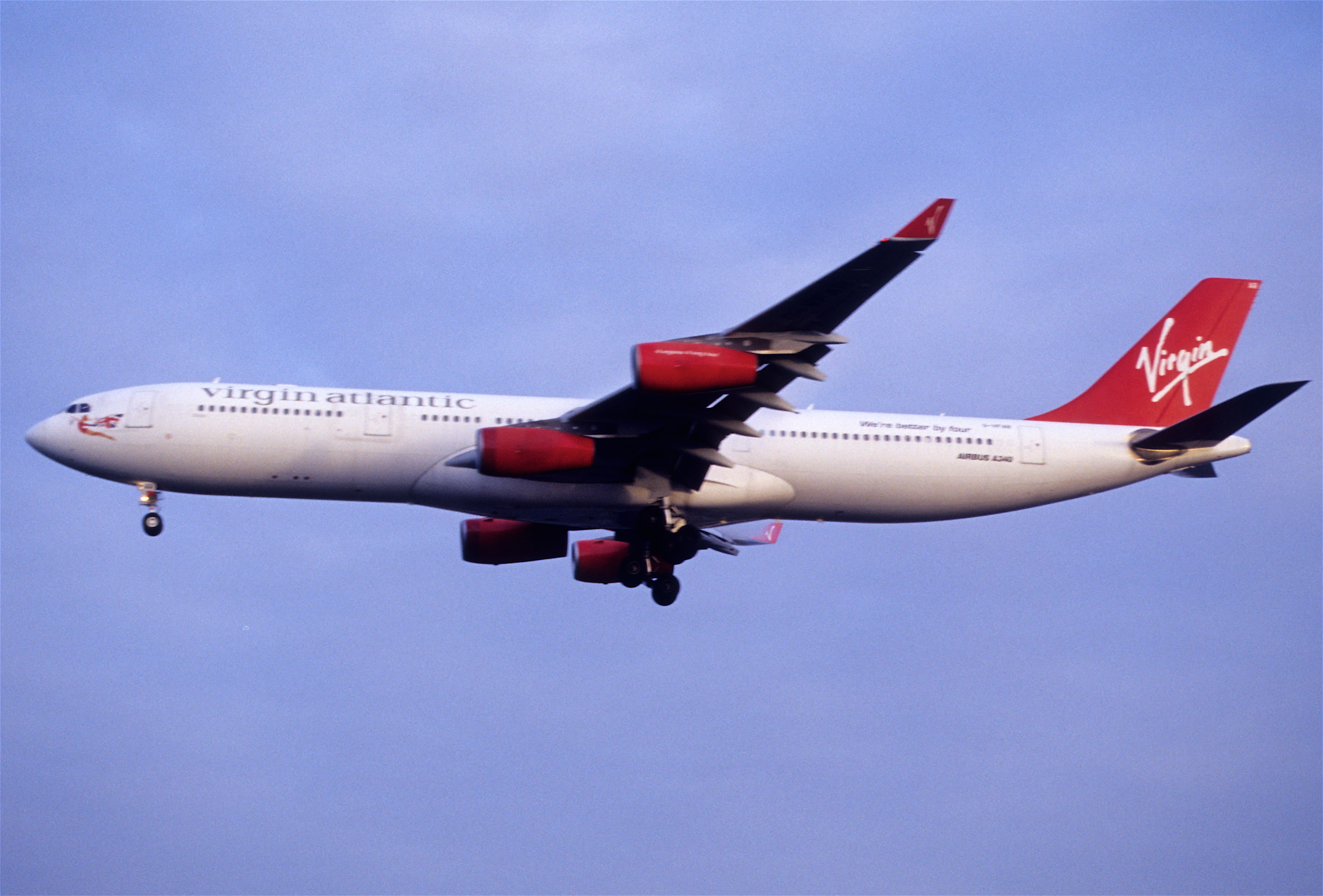
Airbus A340-300 in 2003

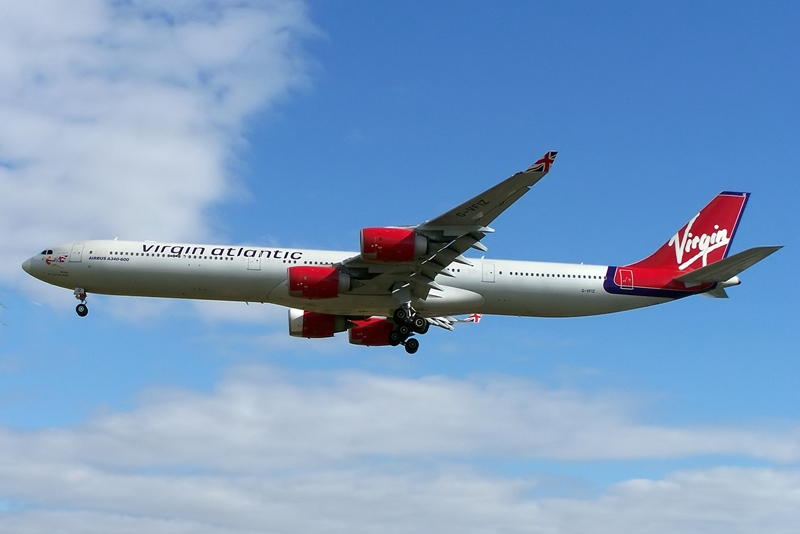
Airbus A340-600 in 2010

== Fleet development ==
Throughout the airline's history, Virgin Atlantic has operated a mix of wide-body aircraft from Airbus and Boeing, as well as a limited number of narrow-body Airbus aircraft. Initially launching with a fleet of Boeing 747-200 aircraft in 1984, the airline's fleet continued to be composed entirely of four-engined wide-body aircraft with the incorporation of a single Boeing 747-100 in 1990, the Airbus A340-300 in 1993, and the larger Boeing 747-400 in 1994. Between 1995 and 2000, the airline began operating the twin-engined Airbus A320 family and Boeing 767. In August 2002, Virgin Atlantic became the first airline to operate the larger Airbus A340-600 variant of the A340. By 2005, the airline retired its Boeing 747-100 and 747-200 aircraft, retaining the 747-400s.

On 27 September 2006, Richard Branson announced plans to reduce greenhouse gas emissions by cutting aircraft weight and fuel consumption. There was also an experiment in 2007 in partnership with Boeing to have aircraft towed to the runway to save fuel, as a potential change to future operational procedures. Virgin Atlantic also volunteered a Boeing 747 for a test of biofuels in February 2008. The aircraft flew without passengers from Heathrow to Amsterdam Airport Schiphol, with 20% of the power for one engine provided by plant-based biofuel. Virgin Atlantic said that it expected to use algae-based biofuels in the future.

On 24 April 2007, Virgin Atlantic announced it had ordered the Boeing 787 Dreamliner, for a total of 15 Boeing 787-9s, with options on eight more. The exercised options, later making for a total fleet of 17 Boeing 787-9s, were planned replace the Heathrow-based 747 fleet during 2015 and 2016. The 787s were due to be delivered in 2011, but by 2008 were expected to be delayed to at least 2013. The following year on 22 June 2009, the airline announced an order for ten Airbus A330-300s, which would enter service initially in 2011, ahead of its delayed Boeing 787s. The announcement of the orders and subsequent induction of the two aircraft types notably ended the airline's four-engined aircraft fleet composition, as the airline previously marketed itself with the "4 engines 4 long haul" slogan. While its first two Airbus A330-300s would operate on leisure-oriented routes following delivery in 2011, Virgin Atlantic would begin operating A330s on its premium routes from Heathrow in April 2012. Virgin Atlantic had also ordered six Airbus A380-800 aircraft, with options on a further six, delivery initially due in 2006, but the deliveries repeatedly deferred. The A380 order was officially cancelled in March 2018, with deposits transferred to A330 and A350 aircraft orders.

In March 2013, Virgin Atlantic resumed operations of narrow-body Airbus A320 family aircraft, with four Airbus A320-200s wet-leased from Aer Lingus to operate short-haul, domestic services from its Heathrow hub. The services were operated by Virgin Atlantic Little Red, a new subsidiary airline founded for the operation of the services. Due to low passenger numbers and significant financial losses, Virgin Atlantic Little Red's services were discontinued by September 2015, and Virgin Atlantic returned to wholly wide-body aircraft operations.

Virgin Atlantic took delivery of its first Boeing 787-9 in October 2014, becoming the first European airline to fly the variant. The older Airbus A340-300 aircraft were withdrawn from service in April 2015, as rising costs had made it less economical to run the type. Virgin Atlantic had begun to replace the A340-300 on routes with the two-engine A330-300 and 787-9. The final Virgin Atlantic A340-300 flight was made on 9 April, landing at Heathrow early on 10 April. Eight of the larger Airbus A340-600s remained in service.

Branson announced in March 2016 that The Spaceship Company would partner with Boom Technology to develop supersonic jets capable of travelling between London and New York in three and a half hours. He confirmed that Virgin Atlantic had options on 10 of the aircraft.

In July 2016, Virgin Atlantic announced an order for 12 Airbus A350-1000 aircraft, to eventually replace the ageing four-engined Boeing 747-400 and Airbus A340-600 fleets. The order consists of eight aircraft which will be purchased directly from Airbus, with a further four acquired through leasing companies. The 12 A350-1000s on order were split into two separate configurations, consisting of a business-oriented, premium-heavy configuration, and a leisure-oriented, economy-heavy configuration for select routes to the Caribbean, Las Vegas, and Orlando, Florida. This order would leave Virgin Atlantic with a streamlined fleet of Airbus A330s, A350s and Boeing 787 aircraft, leaving just two pilot pools and increasing cost efficiencies. The A350s feature three classes – Economy (in a 3–3–3 layout), Premium (2–4–2) and Upper Class (1–2–1) – and its business-oriented configuration features a bar area known as The Loft, which was first introduced on the London to New York route in summer 2019. Its leisure-oriented A350 configuration was announced to feature a special area called The Booth, and was planned for launch on its London to Orlando route in December 2021, but subsequently launched between London and Lagos instead.

Due to engine fan-blade corrosion issues with the fleet of Boeing 787 aircraft, Virgin Atlantic chose to move some of its Manchester-based Boeing 747 and Airbus A330 aircraft to cover routes out of London Heathrow, with the airline temporarily parking some of its 787s while they wait for attention. In 2016, a spokesperson for Rolls-Royce, the manufacturer of the Trent 1000s, said the company "would start producing new corrosion-resistant fan blades by the start of 2017". In place of these aircraft, Virgin Atlantic leased four former Air Berlin A330-200 aircraft, which were announced to be based in Manchester. The A330-200 aircraft arrived in 2018, with full Virgin Atlantic liveries, but with former Air Berlin cabin products, with Virgin Atlantic's Premium Economy to be retrofitted at a later date. Virgin Atlantic said it would add "resilience" to its fleet after the engine issues with its 787s. It was thought these aircraft would be on initial 12-month leases, allowing them to assess their viability in the fleet, with the possibility of extending the leases further. The airline also chose to reinstate a former A340-600 aircraft G-VNAP into the fleet from storage, after purchase from its lessor, to cover for one A340 aircraft leaving the fleet, for which the lease was unable to be extended. The A330-200s began to leave the fleet in late 2021, with the final A330-200 leaving the fleet in March 2022.

On 17 June 2019, Virgin Atlantic announced an order for fourteen Airbus A330-900s, with options for an additional six aircraft, and delivery expected in September 2021. In July 2019, Virgin Atlantic initially announced the retirement of its remaining Airbus A340-600s by November 2019, however in September 2019 had extended the A340-600's service to December 2019, while the airline's Boeing 787 aircraft undergo further repairs on their Rolls-Royce Trent 1000 engines. The retirement date for the A340-600 was subsequently postponed after several changes in date to May 2020, before the type was ultimately retired early on 9 March 2020, with the final scheduled A340-600 service taking place the day prior from Lagos to London Heathrow.

The carrier took delivery of its first Airbus A350-1000 aircraft in August 2019. Though the A350s were intended to gradually replace its fleet of Boeing 747s over time, Virgin Atlantic announced the early retirement of its seven remaining Boeing 747-400 aircraft on 5 May 2020 as an impact of the COVID-19 pandemic and resultant loss in travel demand. The airline had additionally deferred deliveries of its Airbus A330-900s to 2022, as well as its remaining Airbus A350-1000s until later in 2021. In December 2020, Virgin Atlantic sold and leased back two of their latest Boeing 787-9 aircraft to fund the repayment of a loan from Griffin Global Asset Management and to raise up to £70 million ($93 million) worth of funds. In December 2021, the airline leased two additional Airbus A350-1000s with deliveries in 2023 and 2024, increasing its total order to 14 A350s.

On 11 July 2022, Virgin Atlantic announced further details of its incoming Airbus A330-900 fleet, including its seating configuration, that it planned to receive up to sixteen of the type, indicating that two additional planes were ordered and that the first A330-900 would arrive during September 2022, with the aircraft launching on its London to Boston route during October 2022.

On 23 July 2024, Virgin Atlantic announced the completion of its fleet transformation programme with an additional order for seven A330-900s, with deliveries due to begin in 2027. These additional aircraft will bring the airlines fleet up to nineteen neos, which will replace the A330-300s currently in service. Virgin Atlantic is purchasing these aircraft directly from Airbus as the airline moves towards increasing the number of aircraft owned outright, as part of its wider restructuring programme.
