= Alan Hellary =

British pilot

Alan Hellary (29 August 1923 – 28 August 1992) was a British pilot who co-founded British Atlantic Airways, which would later become Virgin Atlantic.

== Biography ==
Alan Hellary was a pilot trained by the Royal Air Force (RAF). After leaving the RAF, he flew briefly for Orient Airways and Ambila Airlines before taking a position with KLM. He later joined Air Charter and British United Airways (BUA) where he met Freddie Laker. Following Laker's departure from BUA in 1965, Hellary followed Laker and took up the position of chief pilot for Laker's new airline, Laker Airways.

Following the collapse of Laker Airways, Hellary was contacted by Randolph Fields, and together they formed a new airline, British Atlantic Airways.
