= Lionair =

Lionair may refer to:

- Lion Air, a major Indonesian low-cost airline
- Lionair (Luxembourg), a defunct Luxembourgish airline
- Lionair (Philippines), a defunct Philippine charter airline
- Lionair (Sri Lanka), a defunct Sri Lankan charter airline
