= Lionair (Luxembourg) =

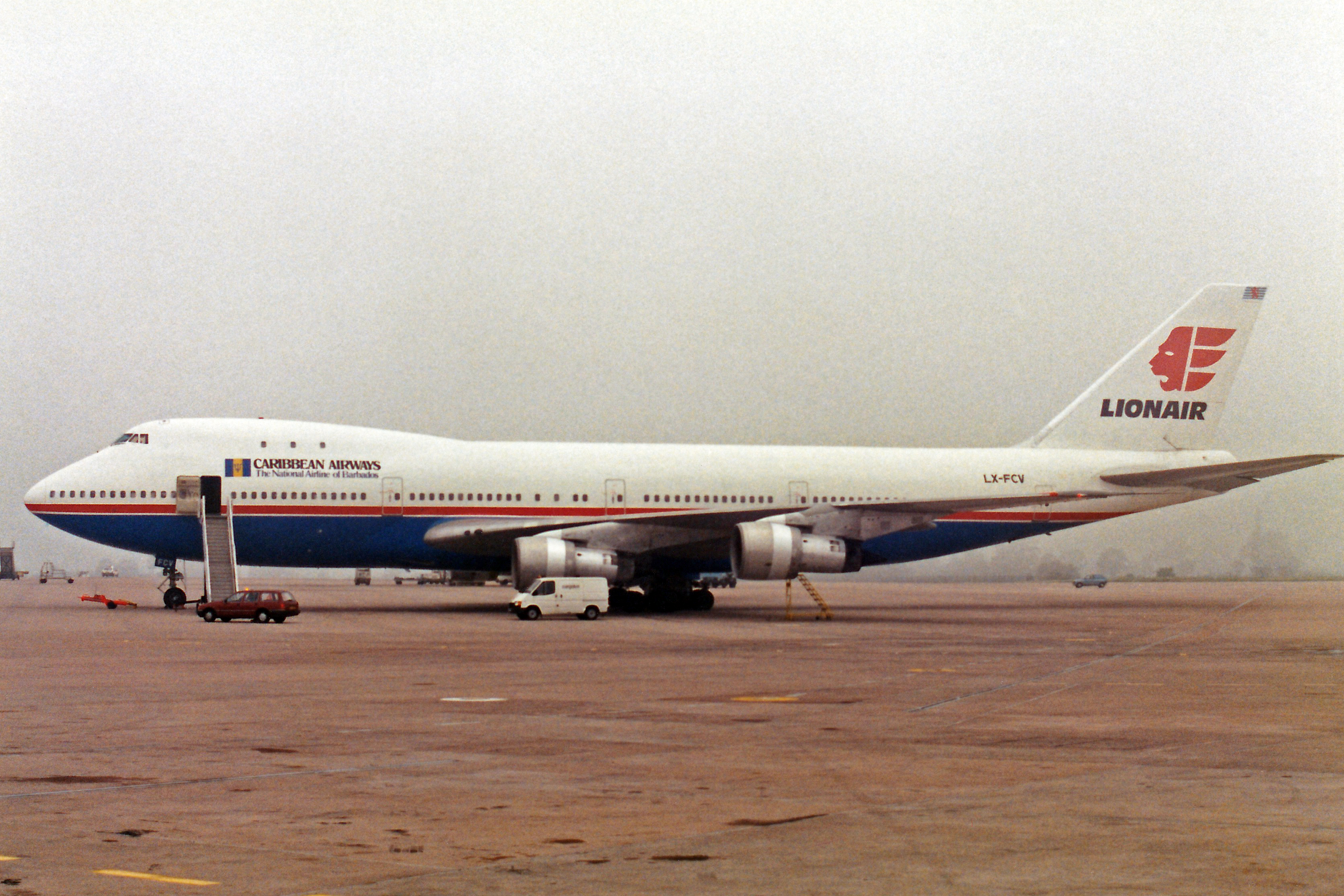
- LX-FCV B747-121 Lionair (Cargolux) at Manchester Airport
IATA	ICAO	Call sign
-	LIR	LAIR
- Commenced operations: 1988
- Ceased operations: 1990
- Operating bases: Manchester International Airport, London Stansted Airport
- Fleet size: 2 Boeing 747-100
- Parent company: Cargolux and Luxair
- Headquarters: Luxembourg

Lionair was a Luxembourg-based passenger airline that operated from 1988 to 1990 as a joint venture of Cargolux and Luxair. The airline ceased all operations in 1990.

== History ==
Lionair was created by Cargolux and the national airline of Luxembourg, Luxair, in 1988. The company obtained two former Pan American World Airways Boeing 747-100 aircraft, converted them into a high density seating layout capable of carrying 492 passengers and re-registered them as LX-GCV and LX-FCV.

Lionair won a major contract with the fast expanding British tour company Airtours, operating long haul Caribbean and Florida routes. This was the start of an unusual arrangement with the use of various operating licences which the company needed to operate legally from the UK.

Both of the Boeing 747s were deployed in the UK for the Airtours flying programme. The main base of Lionair was Manchester International Airport but the company also operated long-haul flights out of London Stansted Airport. The company employed multinational flight deck crews and predominantly British and Irish cabin crew, some of whom came from the recently collapsed Highland Express Airways. Both aircraft had liveries of red, white and blue with the "winged Lionhead" logo on the tail fin.

When operating the Caribbean routes to Puerto Plata, Santo Domingo, Barbados and Antigua, the company adopted the name Caribbean Airways The National Airline of Barbados for one of its aircraft for licensing reasons. For similar reasons, when operating the Orlando, Florida route, the sister 747 used name of the US airline Orionair. This caused much confusion as some passengers thought they were flying with the (now defunct) British Charter airline Orion Airways of East Midlands.

Lionair began to experience a string of delays due to aircraft technical issues, sometimes seeing its Airtours holiday passengers stranded for days. In 1989, Airtours decided to terminate its long-haul flying programme with the company.

From spring 1989 Lionair flew charters for Air France and UTA from Paris to destinations in Saudi Arabia, UAE, Martinique, Guadeloupe, French Guiana and Reunion.

By 1990, Lionair Luxembourg was defunct.
