= Virgin Atlantic Little Red =

Domestic airline of the United Kingdom (2012–2015)

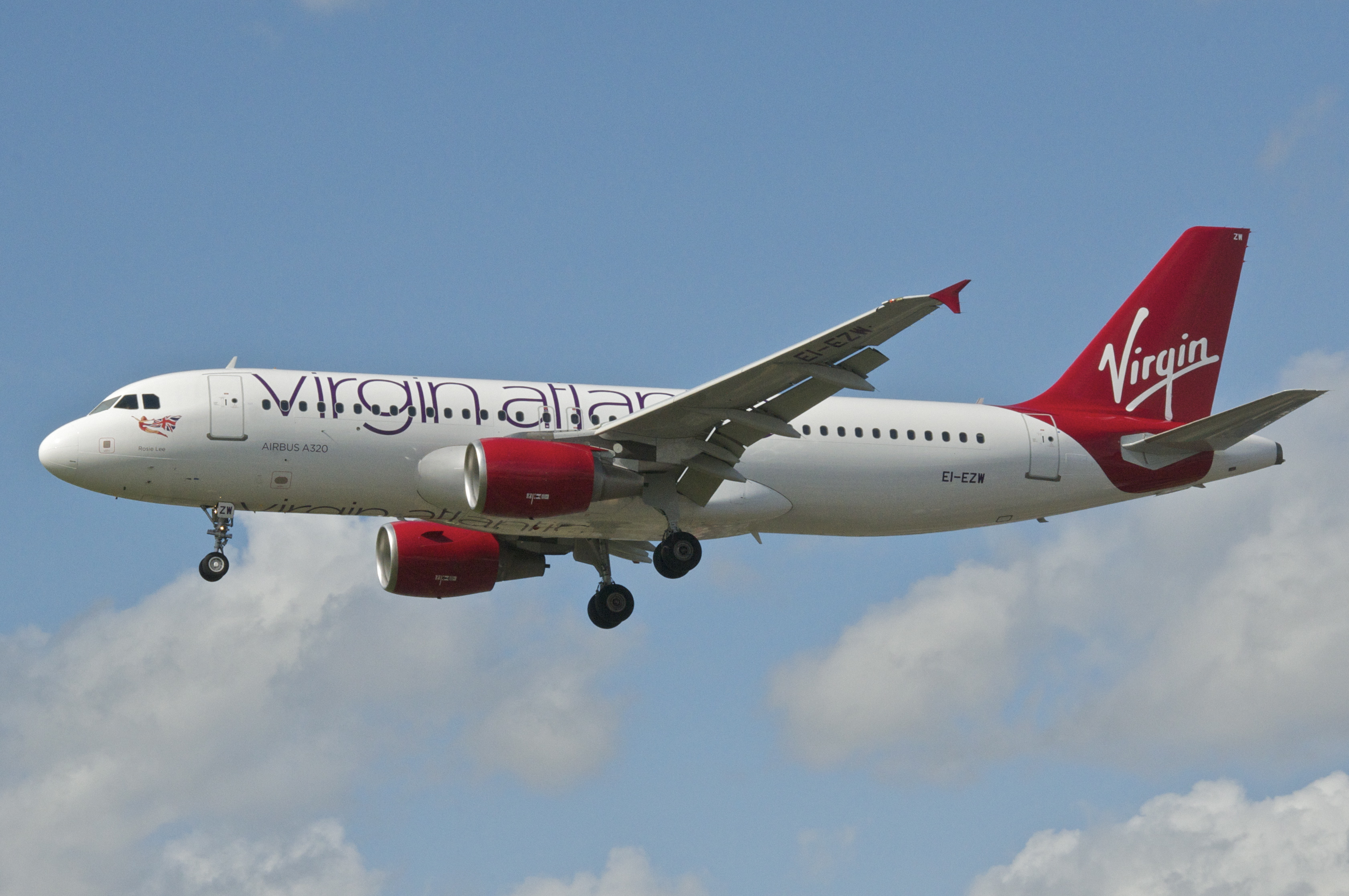
- Little Red Airbus A320-200 wet-leased from Aer Lingus
IATA	ICAO	Call sign
VS	VIR	VIRGIN
- Commenced operations: 31 March 2013
- Ceased operations: 26 September 2015
- Hubs: Heathrow Airport
- Frequent-flyer program: Flying Club
- Fleet size: 4
- Destinations: 4
- Parent company: Virgin Atlantic

Virgin Atlantic Little Red, also referred to as Virgin Little Red and Little Red, was a British domestic airline subsidiary owned by Virgin Atlantic. It was created in 2012 as a way to provide competition for British Airways (BA) on UK domestic mainland flights to Aberdeen, Edinburgh, and Manchester from London Heathrow Airport. During its operation, the airline operated four Airbus A320s wet leased from Irish airline Aer Lingus and served a network of four domestic destinations. The airline ceased operations in 2015 following low passenger numbers.

== History ==
=== Foundation and start of operations ===
In 2012, British Airways took over British Midland International (BMI) which gave them a monopoly on UK mainland flights from Heathrow. In order for the deal to be completed, the European Union Competition Commissioner decreed that BA would have to give up 14 of BMI's landing slots at Heathrow to comply with EU competition regulations. 12 of these slots were set aside for domestic usage, which were bought by Virgin Atlantic after they outbid Aer Lingus for the required British domestic operating licence. Virgin announced that they would set up Virgin Atlantic Little Red as a subsidiary to use these slots to cover domestic UK mainland routes as Aer Lingus already provided competition for BA on flights to Northern Ireland from Heathrow. Little Red was later revealed to be operated on a wet-lease by Aer Lingus whereby the planes would be operated by Aer Lingus but would bear Virgin Atlantic livery. The pilots would be employed by Aer Lingus, with cabin crew supplied by McGinley Aviation. The cabin crew would wear Virgin Little Red uniforms and had training from Virgin, despite the fact that airline had not recently operated narrow-body aircraft.

Virgin announced that initially the airline would operate four daily flights between London Heathrow Airport and Manchester Airport, six daily flights between Heathrow and Edinburgh Airport, and three daily flights between Heathrow and Aberdeen Airport. The airline brand made its first flight on 31 March 2013, flying from Manchester to Heathrow.

The new service was launched in 2013 with owner Sir Richard Branson stating his intent to compete with BA domestically with "Virgin's rock and roll spirit" and to allow Virgin Atlantic's long haul passengers to connect to the rest of the UK using Virgin. In its first six months of operation, Little Red transported 250,000 passengers. Despite Branson's aim and a rise in passenger numbers during the first few months of Little Red's existence, the majority of Little Red's passengers were eventually using it for domestic flights only, rather than as long-haul connections, which led to flights often departing with only a third of seats sold. This was attributed to the fact that Little Red had to operate out of Terminal 1 and later Terminal 2 as Terminal 3 (where Virgin Atlantic flew out of) had no gates for domestic flights. The Civil Aviation Authority published figures that revealed that Little Red had the worst load figures of any airline in aviation at the time with 37.6% of passenger seats occupied. International Airlines Group CEO, Willie Walsh had criticised Little Red calling it a "mistake" and stated "You cannot make money flying aircraft that are less than half full."

=== Losses and shutdown ===
Virgin had claimed that they were prepared to take losses on Little Red, estimated to be up to £3 million a week, in order to wait for an expansion in brand awareness. Virgin then stated that losses on Little Red would be covered by Virgin Atlantic's transatlantic routes. Despite this, as a result of the low passenger numbers in October 2014, it was announced that Little Red would cease to operate from September 2015. This was attributed to BA's dominance of the UK domestic market and Heathrow's restrictions of the usage of the small number of slots available. The slot limitation issue had been mentioned at Little Red's foundation in that the slots to Scottish airports could only be used to fly to Edinburgh and Aberdeen. It was also claimed in the media that passengers preferred to use low-cost carriers such as EasyJet to fly to and from other London airports aside of Heathrow for domestic travel owing to pricing.

Little Red's flights to Manchester ended in March 2015 with the final flights to Edinburgh and Aberdeen departing on 26 September 2015. The planes were returned for Aer Lingus' sole use in the Republic of Ireland following the final passenger flights of Little Red. After the closure of Little Red, all but three of the Heathrow slots were returned to BA and absorbed back into their operation, thus granting them a monopoly on UK mainland domestic flights at Heathrow for the first time since British Midland Airways (as BMI were named at the time) moved into Heathrow in 1982. However this was dependent on another airline not being willing to take the place of Little Red in running domestic flights from Heathrow. Virgin leased out the three slots it retained. In 2017, the remaining Little Red slots were taken over by Flybe. BA received them back in 2020 after Flybe's collapse. The slots were subsequently taken over by Loganair in 2023.

== Destinations ==
During its operation, Virgin Atlantic Little Red operated to four destinations in the United Kingdom.

City	Airport	Begin	End	Ref.
Aberdeen	Aberdeen Airport	9 April 2013	26 September 2015	
Edinburgh	Edinburgh Airport	5 April 2013	26 September 2015	
London	Heathrow Airport^{Hub}	31 March 2013	26 September 2015	
Manchester	Manchester Airport	31 March 2013	28 March 2015	

== Fleet ==
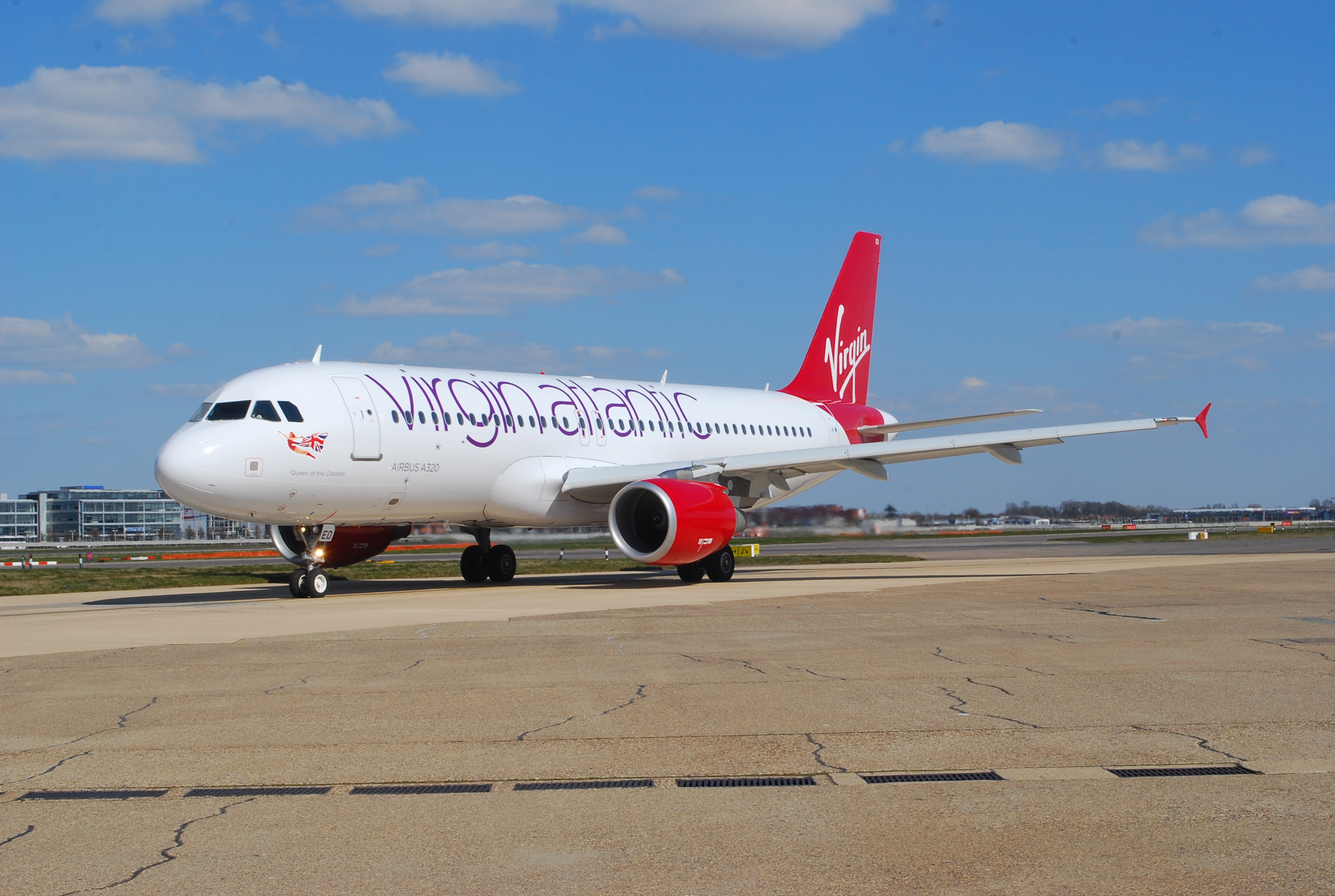
Little Red A320 at Heathrow

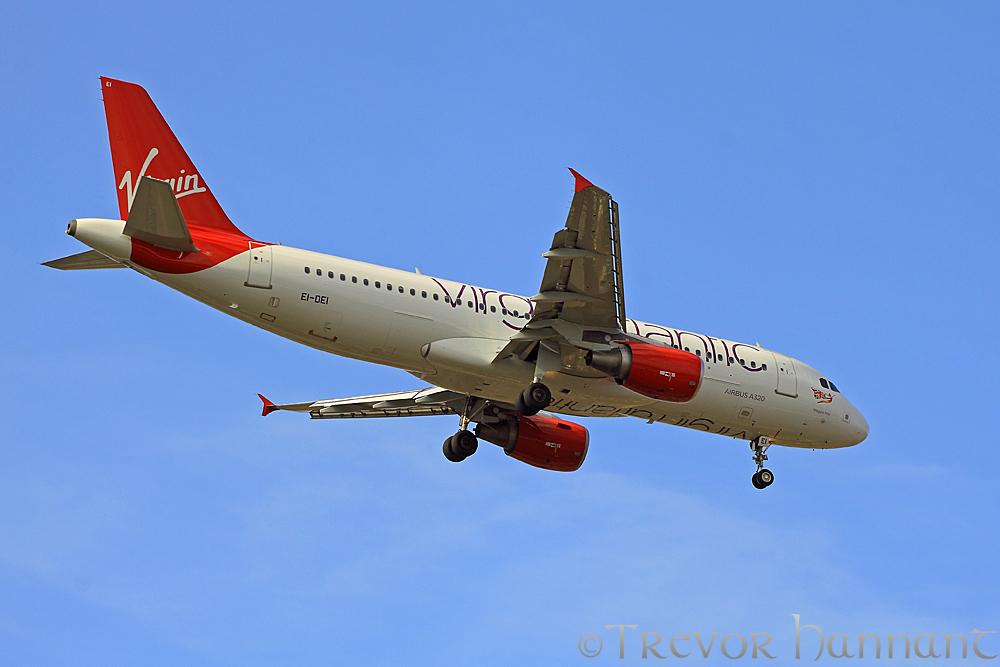
Little Red A320 on approach

During its operation, Virgin Atlantic Little Red's fleet consisted of four Airbus A320s wet-leased from Aer Lingus under a three-year contract. The aircraft had 29 rows of seating with a 3–3 configuration for a total of 174 seats. The fleet was painted with Virgin Atlantic livery with future plans to eventually repaint them with Little Red livery. However, due to the closure of operations, this rebrand of the planes never occurred and they retained their original livery.

The idea was mooted that Aer Lingus would take over the Little Red routes under their own brand with the Little Red fleet repainted. However, they declined to do this, stating that they wanted more flexibility with the returned aircraft to support their current fleet and operation. Aer Lingus repainted EI-DEI and DEO, two of the aircraft operated under the Little Red brand, in its "Green Spirit" branding in May 2015, as part of its partnership with the Irish Rugby Football Union.

== See also ==
- List of defunct airlines of the United Kingdom
