= List of Virgin Atlantic destinations =

The following is a list of current and former destinations served by Virgin Atlantic and its subsidiary Virgin Atlantic International as of March 2025.

== Passenger ==
Country/region	Town	Airport	Notes	Refs
Antigua and Barbuda	St. John's	V. C. Bird International Airport		
Australia	Sydney	Sydney Airport	Terminated	
Bahamas	Nassau	Lynden Pindling International Airport	Terminated	
Barbados	Bridgetown	Grantley Adams International Airport		
Canada	Toronto	Toronto Pearson International Airport		
Canada	Vancouver	Vancouver International Airport	Terminated	
China	Shanghai	Shanghai Pudong International Airport	Terminated	
Cuba	Havana	José Martí International Airport	Terminated	
Cuba	Varadero	Juan Gualberto Gómez Airport	Terminated	
Ghana	Accra	Accra International Airport	Terminated	
Greece	Athens	Athens International Airport	Terminated	
Grenada	St. George's	Maurice Bishop International Airport		
Hong Kong	Hong Kong	Hong Kong International Airport	Terminated	
Hong Kong	Hong Kong	Kai Tak Airport	Airport closed	
India	Bengaluru	Kempegowda International Airport		
India	Delhi	Indira Gandhi International Airport		
India	Mumbai	Chhatrapati Shivaji Maharaj International Airport		
Ireland	Dublin	Dublin Airport	Terminated	
Israel	Tel Aviv	Ben Gurion Airport	Terminated	
Jamaica	Kingston	Norman Manley International Airport	Terminated	
Jamaica	Montego Bay	Sangster International Airport		
Japan	Tokyo	Narita International Airport	Terminated	
Kenya	Nairobi	Jomo Kenyatta International Airport	Terminated	
Maldives	Malé	Velana International Airport	Seasonal	
Mauritius	Port Louis	Sir Seewoosagur Ramgoolam International Airport	Terminated	
Mexico	Cancún	Cancún International Airport		
Nigeria	Lagos	Murtala Muhammed International Airport		
Nigeria	Port Harcourt	Port Harcourt International Airport	Terminated	
Pakistan	Islamabad	Islamabad International Airport	Terminated	
Pakistan	Lahore	Allama Iqbal International Airport	Terminated	
Saudi Arabia	Riyadh	King Khalid International Airport	Terminated	
South Africa	Cape Town	Cape Town International Airport	Seasonal	
South Africa	Johannesburg	O. R. Tambo International Airport		
South Korea	Seoul	Incheon International Airport		
St. Lucia	Vieux Fort	Hewanorra International Airport	Terminated	
St. Vincent and the Grenadines	Kingstown	Argyle International Airport		
Thailand	Phuket	Phuket International Airport		
Trinidad and Tobago	Scarborough	A. N. R. Robinson International Airport	Terminated	
Turks and Caicos Islands	Providenciales	Providenciales International Airport	Terminated	
United Arab Emirates	Dubai	Dubai International Airport	Terminated	
United Kingdom	Belfast	Belfast International Airport	Terminated	
United Kingdom	Edinburgh	Edinburgh Airport	Seasonal	
United Kingdom	Glasgow	Glasgow Airport	Terminated	
United Kingdom	London	Gatwick Airport	Terminated	
United Kingdom	London	Heathrow Airport	Hub	
United Kingdom	London	Luton Airport	Terminated	
United Kingdom	Manchester	Manchester Airport	Hub	
United States	Atlanta	Hartsfield–Jackson Atlanta International Airport		
United States	Austin	Austin–Bergstrom International Airport	Terminated	
United States	Baltimore	Baltimore Washington International Airport	Terminated	
United States	Boston	Logan International Airport		
United States	Chicago	O'Hare International Airport	Terminated	
United States	Detroit	Detroit Metropolitan Airport	Terminated	
United States	Las Vegas	Harry Reid International Airport		
United States	Los Angeles	Los Angeles International Airport		
United States	Miami	Miami International Airport		
United States	New York City	John F. Kennedy International Airport		
United States	Newark	Newark Liberty International Airport	Terminated	
United States	Orlando	Orlando International Airport		
United States	San Francisco	San Francisco International Airport		
United States	Seattle	Seattle–Tacoma International Airport	Seasonal	
United States	Tampa	Tampa International Airport		
United States	Washington, D.C.	Dulles International Airport		

== Cargo ==
In addition to the previously listed destinations served with scheduled passenger service, Virgin Atlantic has also operated scheduled, cargo-only flights on its passenger aircraft to the following destinations as of August 2021:

Country/region	City	Airport	Notes	Refs
Belgium	Brussels	Brussels Airport	European cargo hub	
China	Beijing	Beijing Capital International Airport	Terminated	
China	Xiamen	Xiamen Gaoqi International Airport	Terminated	
Germany	Frankfurt	Frankfurt Airport		
Ireland	Dublin	Dublin Airport		
Italy	Milan	Milan Malpensa Airport		
Norway	Harstad	Harstad/Narvik Airport, Evenes	Terminated	
Puerto Rico	San Juan	Luis Muñoz Marín International Airport		
