= Highland Express Airways =

British airline based in Scotland

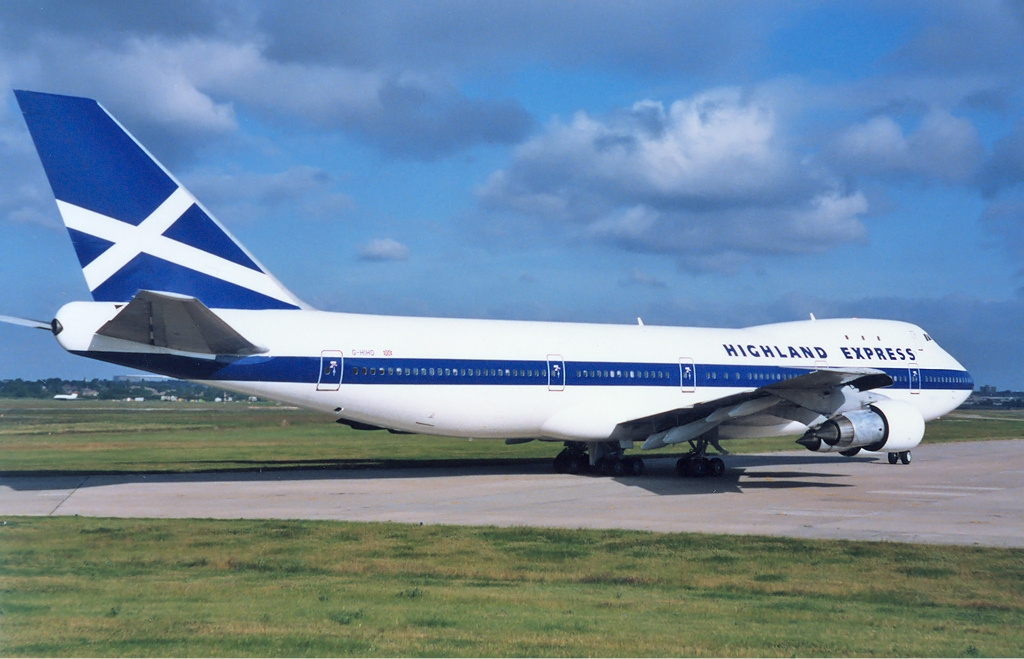
- Boeing 747-100 in 1987
IATA	ICAO	Call sign
VY	TTN	TARTAN
- Founded: 1984
- Commenced operations: June 1987
- Ceased operations: November 1987
- Operating bases: Glasgow Prestwick Airport
- Fleet size: 1
- Destinations: New York-Newark, London Stansted, Birmingham, London Gatwick, Brussels
- Headquarters: Glasgow Prestwick Airport

Highland Express Airways Ltd. was a Scottish airline based at Prestwick Airport. It ceased operations in 1987 after nearly five months from the launch.

== History ==
The airline was formed in 1984 by Randolph Fields who had been involved with the concept and start up of Virgin Atlantic, bringing Branson to the table as backer. Highland Express planned to officially launch on the day of the Scottish International Airshow in Glasgow on Saturday, 30 May 1987 to Newark and Toronto. However, the first scheduled flight using a Highland Express flight number actually took place a few days earlier. That flight used a hired Cargolux Boeing 747-200 as the airline's own Boeing 747 had not yet been delivered. Highland Express cabin crew were specially trained to operate this version of the 747 in time for this inaugural flight and wore the airline's tartan and green uniforms. Cabin crew for the start up operation were recruited locally in Ayrshire and Glasgow. Senior crew members were recruited from experienced British crew. Fields was on board the inaugural flight, and complimentary refreshments were served to celebrate. Many of the passengers with return tickets on that flight were forced to return using the Northwest Airlines service with the booking paid for by Highland Express. Things continued to go wrong when the Toronto route licence was not forthcoming and their sole Boeing 747 was delivered weeks late.

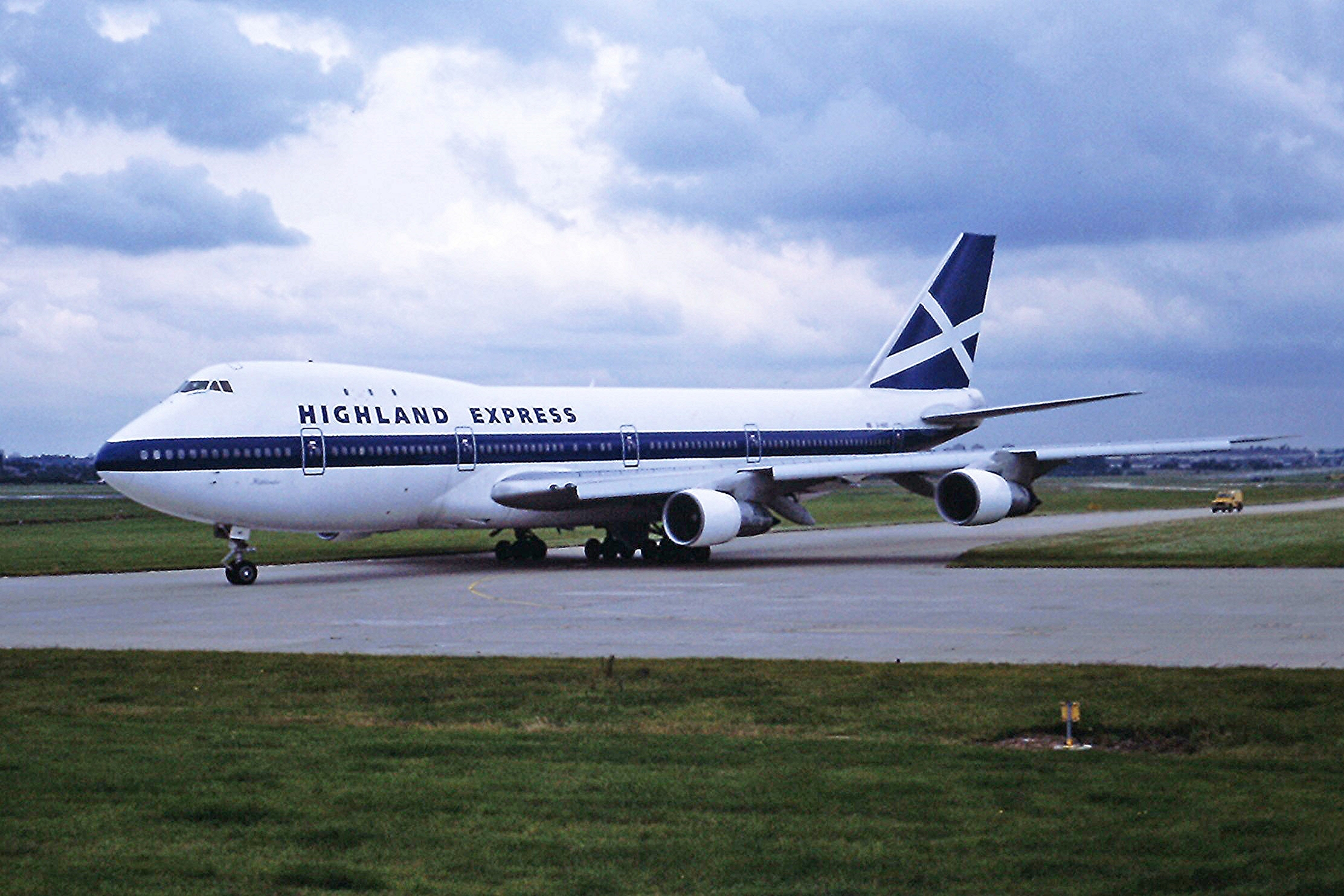
Boeing 747-100

Operations finally began with flight VY201 from London Stansted Airport to Newark via Prestwick on 30 June 1987. Operations out of Birmingham Airport began 4 July 1987 on flight VY211. Initially, four Stansted and three Birmingham rotations were planned weekly. However, after a few weeks the Monday morning flight from Newark to Stansted via Prestwick routed onto Brussels for maintenance with Sabena, returning on a Tuesday. Passengers could purchase a one-way economy ticket from Prestwick to Stansted for £19 and could travel first class for an extra fee. This made Highland Express the first scheduled low-cost carrier from Prestwick, Stansted and Birmingham.

With passenger numbers not meeting targets and debts mounting, a short-lived service from Gatwick Airport to Newark via Prestwick was launched in November. But some three weeks later the lessors of the aircraft, Citicorp, repossessed the aircraft while it was in Brussels for maintenance.

== Destinations ==
According to the 30 May 1987 Highland Express system timetable, the airline was operating scheduled round trip Boeing 747 passenger service on the following routes:

- VY 201/202: London Stansted Airport (STN) - Glasgow Prestwick Airport (PIK) - New York Newark Airport (EWR) - operated four days a week
- VY 211/212: Birmingham (BHX) - Glasgow Prestwick Airport (PIK) - New York Newark Airport (EWR) - operated three days a week

== See also ==
- List of defunct airlines of the United Kingdom
