= Randolph Fields =

American businessman (1952–1997)

Randolph Fields (29 December 1952 in Santa Monica, California – 24 February 1997 in Jersey, Channel Islands) was an Anglo-American lawyer who founded British Atlantic Airways, which later became Virgin Atlantic. After differences with Richard Branson, Fields sold his share of Virgin Atlantic in 1985, becoming a sterling millionaire. He subsequently invested much of his fortune in the short-lived Highland Express Airways, which flew from New York to Prestwick, Scotland.

Fields was born in California, and moved to London aged 9. He qualified as a lawyer, and was a member of the English Bar and California Bar.

Known in insurance circles as an expert on asbestos and environmental hazards coverage, his work involved weekly trans-Atlantic commuting where he took advantage of lifetime complimentary first class travel on Virgin Atlantic, long after being bought out.

Fields was also a well-known poker player on both sides of the Atlantic. Principally known as a "cash" player, Fields won a European Poker Title and was a fixture at the major poker tournaments in Las Vegas, including the World Series of Poker. Fields was an early financial backer of Phil Hellmuth.

In The Independent David Spanier wrote this assessment :

"Randolph Fields lit up any poker game he played in. Some players thought he was good value because he threw his chips into the pot with such abandon. Others recognised that beneath this swashbuckling play, Randolph had a pretty sharp mind for cards. I often saw him demolish the table by his aggressive betting in tournaments. Above all he brought a boyish enthusiasm to the game, a zest for a good gamble, which is quite rare these days."

Randolph Fields had an identical twin brother Robbie Fields, owner of Posh Boy Records. Fields' older brother is well known London-based fashion mogul Gifi Fields.

He married barrister Fiona Harvie-Smith in 1986. Their child Randolph Jr. was born eight weeks before his death. Fields died from cancer in 1997, aged 44.
