= Virgin Atlantic =

Airline of the United Kingdom

Virgin Atlantic Airways Limited Virgin Atlantic International Limited

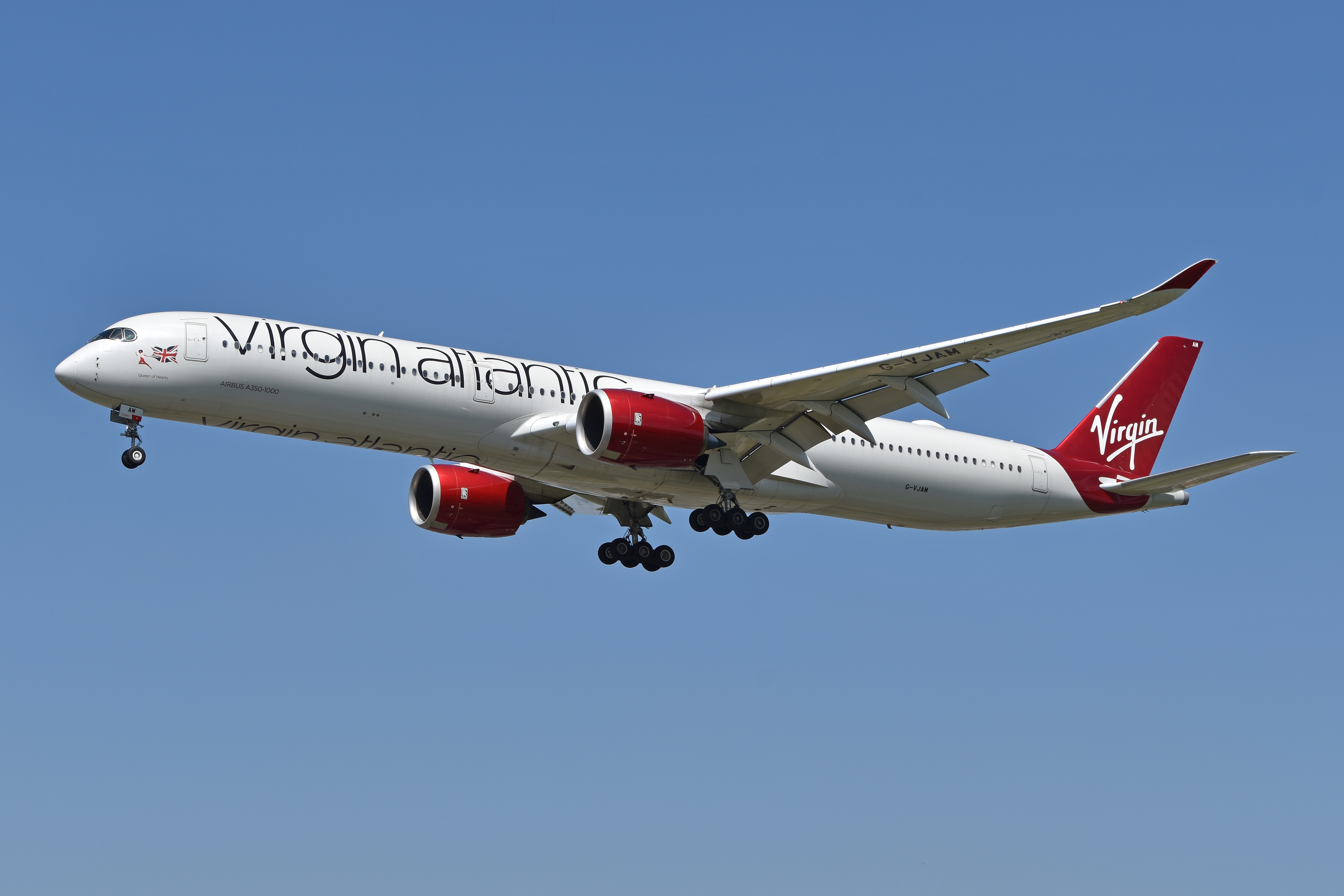
- Virgin Atlantic A350-1000
IATA	ICAO	Call sign
VS	VIR	VIRGIN
- Founded: 1984; 42 years ago
- Commenced operations: 22 June 1984; 42 years ago
- AOC #: 534 (VAA Ltd); 2435 (VAI Ltd)
- Hubs: London–Heathrow; Manchester
- Frequent-flyer program: Flying Club
- Alliance: SkyTeam
- Fleet size: 43
- Destinations: 29
- Parent company: Virgin Atlantic Limited (owned 51% by Virgin Group, 49% by Delta Air Lines)
- Headquarters: Crawley, West Sussex, England
- Key people: Corneel Koster (CEO); Peter Norris (chairman)
- Founder: Richard Branson
- Revenue: ▲£3.301 billion (2024)
- Operating income: ▲£230.5 million (2024)
- Net income: ▼£-131.8 million (2024)
- Total assets: ▲£4.214 billion (2024)
- Total equity: ▼£-1.280 billion (2024)
- Employees: ▲8760 (2024)
- Website: virginatlantic.com

Virgin Atlantic, a trading name of Virgin Atlantic Airways Limited and Virgin Atlantic International Limited, is a British airline with its head office in Crawley, West Sussex, England. The airline was established in 1984 as British Atlantic Airways, and was originally planned by its co-founders Randolph Fields and Alan Hellary to fly between London and the Falkland Islands. Soon after changing the name to Virgin Atlantic Airways, Fields sold his shares in the company to Richard Branson in return for unlimited free travel. Its maiden flight from London–Gatwick to Newark took place on 22 June 1984.

The airline is controlled by a holding company, Virgin Atlantic Limited, which is 51% owned by the Virgin Group and 49% by Delta Air Lines. The airline joined the SkyTeam airline alliance in March 2023.

Virgin Atlantic uses a mixed fleet of Airbus and Boeing wide-body aircraft and operates to destinations in North America, the Caribbean, Africa, the Middle East, and Asia from its main hub at Heathrow and its secondary hub at Manchester. The airline also operates a seasonal service from Edinburgh. Virgin Atlantic aircraft consist of three cabins: Economy, Premium (formerly Premium economy), and Upper Class (business).

== History ==
=== Origins ===
Alan Hellary, Richard Branson, and Randolph Fields launch Virgin Atlantic at the 1984 press conference

Virgin Atlantic has its origins in a joint endeavour by Randolph Fields, an American-born lawyer, and Alan Hellary, a former chief pilot for British private airline Laker Airways. Following the collapse of Laker Airways in 1982, Fields and Hellary decided to establish a new company, initially named British Atlantic Airways, as a successor. Reportedly, Fields had formed a concept for an airline that would operate between London and the Falkland Islands during June 1982, when the Falklands War had just finished.

However, it was soon determined that the short runway at Port Stanley Airport, and the time it would take to improve it, would render a route to the Falklands commercially unviable; thus, the idea of such a service was dropped. In its place, Hellary and Fields commenced efforts to secure a licence to operate a route between Gatwick Airport, London and John F. Kennedy International Airport, New York City. During May 1983, a three-day inquiry was conducted, which chose to reject the application following objections from British Airways, British Caledonian and BAA.

Hellary and Fields then applied for a licence between Gatwick and Newark, New Jersey, using a 380-seat McDonnell Douglas DC-10.

=== Formative years ===
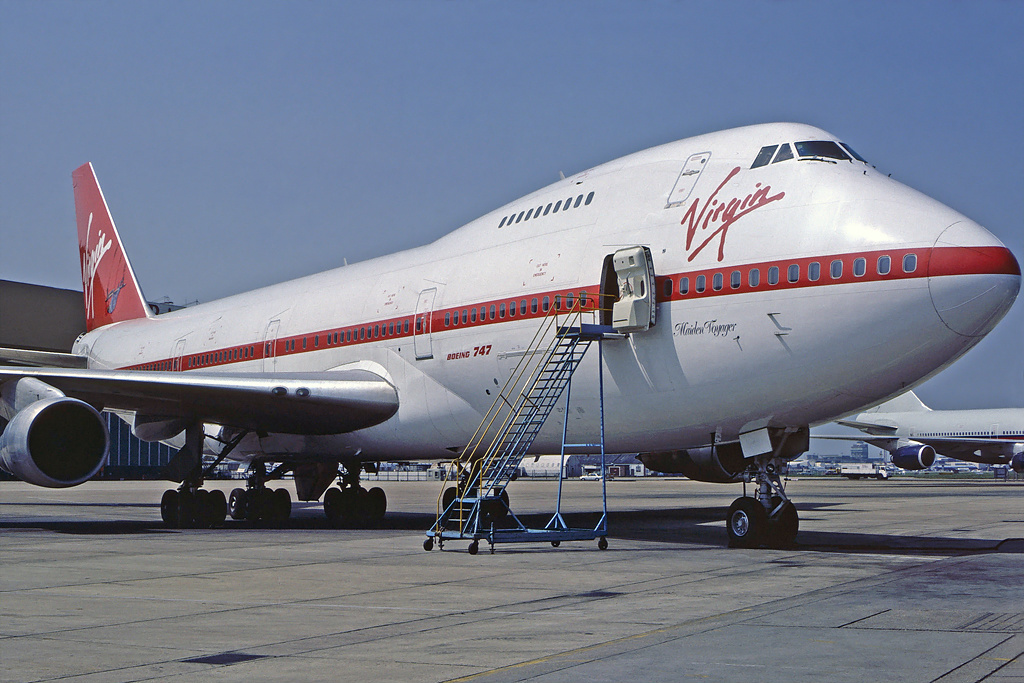
Boeing 747-200 Maiden Voyager operated the first scheduled Virgin Atlantic service on 22 June 1984.

On 22 June 1984, Virgin Atlantic operated its inaugural scheduled service, flown between Gatwick and Newark using a leased Boeing 747-200 (registration G-VIRG), christened Maiden Voyager, which had been formerly operated by Aerolíneas Argentinas. From the onset, its activities were augmented by leveraging existing Virgin Group resources, such as tickets being sold at Virgin Megastores record shops.

Part of Richard Branson's declared approach to business is to either succeed within the first year or exit the market; this ethos includes a one-year limit on everything associated with starting up operations.

In November 1984, the airline launched a service between Gatwick Airport and Maastricht Aachen Airport in the Netherlands using a chartered BAC One-Eleven.

In 1986, the airline added another Boeing 747 to its fleet and started a scheduled route from Gatwick to Miami. Additional aircraft were quickly acquired, and new routes were launched from Gatwick, such as to New York JFK in 1988, Tokyo Narita in 1989, Los Angeles in 1990, Boston in 1991, and Orlando in 1992. In 1987, Virgin Atlantic launched a service between Luton and Dublin using secondhand Vickers Viscount turboprop aircraft, but this route was withdrawn around 1990. The airline also operated a Viscount service between Maastricht and London Luton Airport in 1989.

=== Competition ===
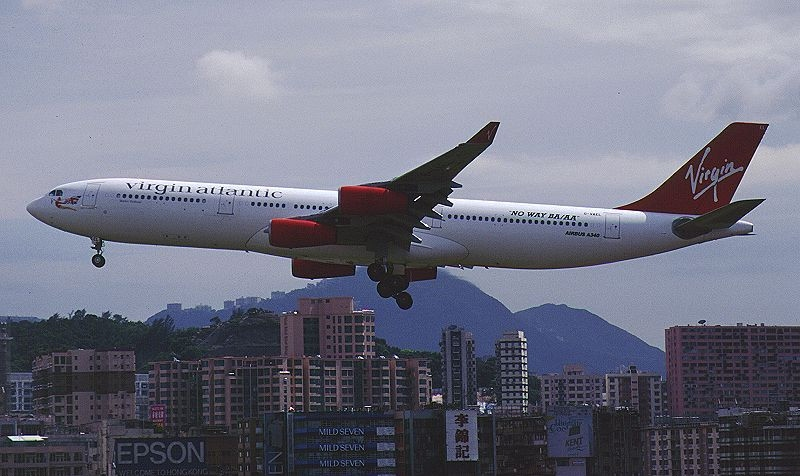
Airbus A340-300 landing at Kai Tak Airport, displaying the "No Way BA/AA" livery

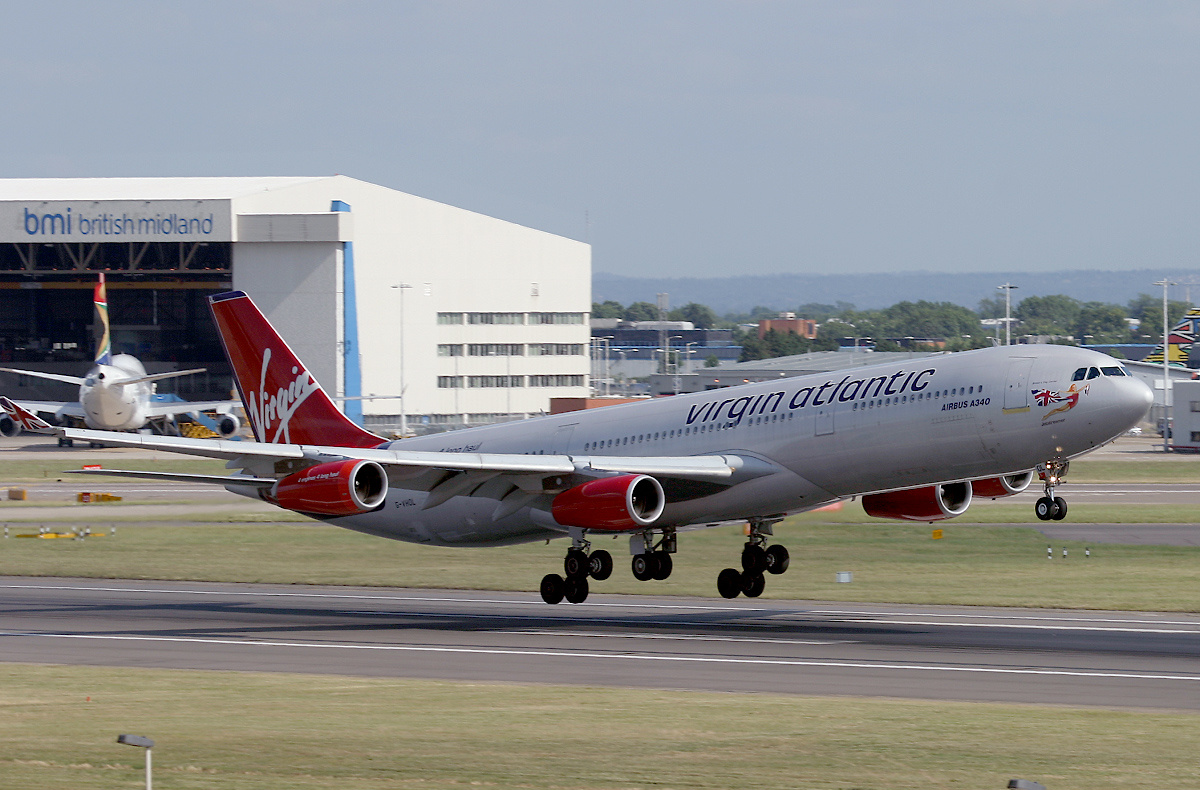
Airbus A340-300 at Heathrow Airport in 2003, displaying "4 Engines 4 Longhaul" slogan

In 1991, Virgin Atlantic was given permission to operate from Heathrow following the abolition of the London Air Traffic Distribution Rules (TDRs), which had governed the distribution of traffic between Heathrow and Gatwick airports since 1978, primarily to bolster the profitability of Gatwick.

The Civil Aviation Authority also transferred two pairs of unused landing slots that British Airways held at Tokyo's Narita Airport to Virgin Atlantic, allowing it to increase frequency between Heathrow and Tokyo from four to six weekly round trips, making it easier to compete against British Airways. The chairman of BA, Lord King, called the CAA's decision, which the government had endorsed, "a confiscation of his company's property".

In later years, the scarcity of Heathrow slots became a structural constraint on Virgin Atlantic's growth and on other airlines seeking to enter the airport. The Competition and Markets Authority has described slots at capacity-constrained airports as a key barrier to entry, because an airline that wants to compete on a route may have to obtain slots from incumbent carriers. A 2023 Department for Transport consultation said that the new entrant rule was intended to help airlines gain access to slot-congested airports, but that in summer 2022 only 12 Heathrow slots were allocated to new entrants from the pool, out of 152,613 summer slots at the airport. The same consultation said that, because most slots at capacity-constrained airports were allocated under historic rights, it was not always practical for new entrant airlines to pursue pool slots.

In the year to October 1993, Virgin Atlantic declared a loss of £9.3 million. The decision to abolish the London TDRs and to let Virgin Atlantic operate at Heathrow, in competition with British Airways, became the trigger for BA's so-called dirty tricks campaign against the company. During 1993, BA's public relations director, David Burnside, published an article in BA News, British Airways' internal magazine, which argued that Branson's protests against British Airways were a publicity stunt. Branson sued British Airways for libel, using the services of George Carman QC. BA settled out of court when its lawyers discovered the lengths to which the company had gone in trying to kill off Virgin Atlantic. British Airways had to pay a legal bill of up to £3 million, damages to Branson of £500,000, and a further £110,000 to his airline. Branson reportedly donated the proceeds from the case to Virgin Atlantic staff.

During the late 1990s, Virgin Atlantic jets were painted with "No Way BA/AA" as a declaration of its opposition to the attempted merger between British Airways and American Airlines. In 1997, following British Airways' announcement that it was to remove the Union Flag from its tailfins in favour of world images, Virgin Atlantic introduced a Union Flag design on the winglets of its aircraft and changed the red dress on the Scarlet Lady on the nose of aircraft to the union flag with the tag line "Britain's Flag Carrier". This was a tongue-in-cheek challenge to BA's traditional role as the UK's flag carrier.

In June 2006, US and UK competition authorities investigated alleged price fixing between Virgin Atlantic and British Airways over passenger fuel surcharges. In August 2007, BA was fined £271 million by the UK Office of Fair Trading (OFT) and the US Department of Justice. However, the Chief Executive of Virgin Atlantic, Steve Ridgway, was forced to admit that the company had been a party to the agreement, had been aware of the price-fixing and had taken no steps whatsoever to stop the price-fixing.

In April 2010, a tip-off from Cathay Pacific led to an OFT investigation of alleged price-fixing between Virgin Atlantic and Cathay Pacific on flights to Hong Kong between 2002 and 2006. Cathay Pacific received immunity from prosecution for reporting the alleged offence. A maximum fine, if found guilty, was 10% of turnover, which, based on the £2.5 billion in sales for the year to February 2009, would have been £250 million. At the time, the OFT stressed that it should not be assumed that the parties involved had broken the law. The OFT cleared both airlines in December 2012, concluding there were no grounds for action.

=== Recent years ===
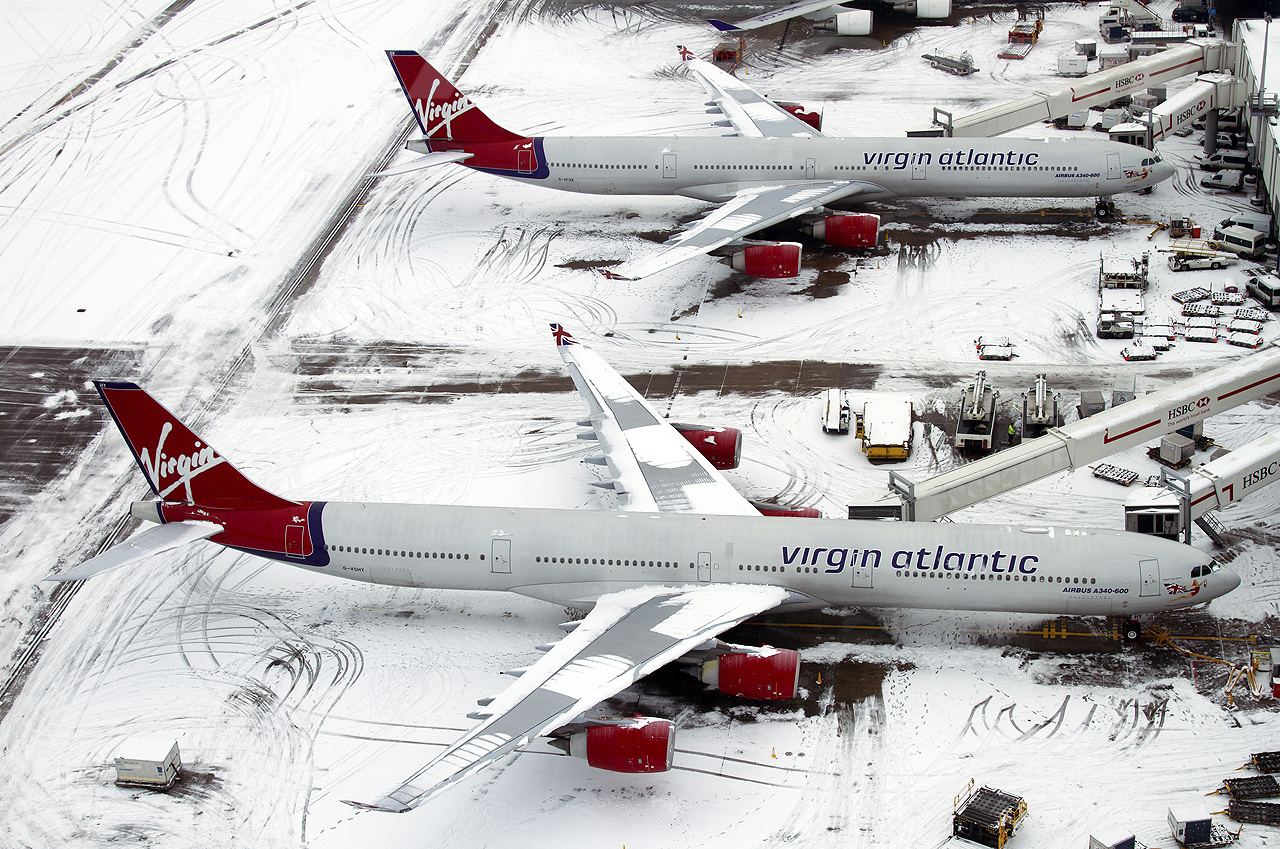
Two Virgin Atlantic Airbus A340-600s at Heathrow Airport

In December 2004, Virgin Atlantic began flying to Sydney, Australia via Hong Kong. In May 2014 the Sydney service ceased.

In September 2014, Virgin Atlantic announced plans to scrap flights to Tokyo, Mumbai, Vancouver, and Cape Town, and to codeshare transatlantic flights with Delta Air Lines; the company was also reported to be considering axing its new Little Red domestic airline after suffering heavy losses.

On 6 October 2014, Virgin Atlantic confirmed that Little Red services between London and Manchester would end in March 2015, and that the Scottish routes would be terminated in September 2015.

In June 2015, Richard Branson stated that Virgin Atlantic had needed the aforementioned deal with Delta to survive, after losses of £233 million between 2010 and 2013. In the same month, the airline announced it would cut 500 jobs to establish a more efficient management structure.

In July 2017, Air France-KLM nearly acquired a 31% stake in Virgin Atlantic for £220 million. This deal however never went through.

In 2019, Virgin Atlantic began to allow its female flight attendants to not wear makeup and have a choice to wear trousers rather than a skirt. In September 2019, it was announced Virgin Atlantic had outlined plans to expand. A key part of these plans would have been acquiring Flybe, with a plan to rebrand it as "Virgin Connect" from early 2020; however, the plans fell through when Flybe filed for administration and ceased operations in March 2020. In December 2019, Branson announced that he would be scrapping the sale of a 31% stake in the airline to Air France-KLM and that Virgin Group would retain its 51% shareholding. In the same year, Virgin Atlantic stopped flying to Dubai, a major aviation and tourism hub owing to COVID and issues related to competition.

In March 2020, during the COVID-19 pandemic, Richard Branson and Virgin Atlantic attracted criticism by asking employees to take eight weeks' unpaid leave. However, this was before the UK Government announced the Coronavirus Job Retention Scheme, and employees were subsequently furloughed instead. Whilst furloughed, many staff volunteered with the National Health Service, answering 999 calls, and at NHS trusts in London and the South East. On 27 March, it was reported that Virgin Atlantic was expected to seek a government bailout, which was on 1 April reportedly backed by Rolls-Royce, Airbus and Heathrow Airport Holdings.

In May 2020, Virgin Atlantic announced over 3,000 jobs losses in the UK and an imminent end to operations at Gatwick Airport. On 7 June, Virgin Atlantic commenced cargo-only flights between Brussels Airport and London Heathrow, feeding the high demand for European cargo into its network via LHR. As of 2022 the flights still continue on a daily basis, using all aircraft types within the fleet.On 4 August, Virgin Atlantic filed for bankruptcy protection from creditors in the US as part of a recapitalisation and debt restructuring plan. On 25 August 2020, creditors approved the £1.2bn (€1.3bn) rescue package and debt restructuring. On 4 September 2020, Virgin Atlantic announced a second round of job cuts, totalling 1,150 across all departments. Since the start of 2020, the company halved its workforce due to the COVID-19 pandemic. Chief executive Shai Weiss said that "further reducing the number of people we employ is heartbreaking but essential."

As of February 2022, during Russia's invasion of Ukraine, Virgin Atlantic, along with the other UK carriers, observed a ban from travelling in Russian airspace that was a retaliatory measure for the UK's ban on Russia's main carrier, Aeroflot and all other Russian private jets and carriers from using UK airspace.

On 27 September 2022, Virgin Atlantic announced that the airline would join SkyTeam airline alliance in early 2023. It was first time that a British airline joined an airline alliance since British Midland International joined Star Alliance in 2002 and British Airways of Oneworld in 1999. In February 2023, the airline stated that it would join SkyTeam on 2 March 2023.

In November 2023, the airline announced plans to resume its flights to Dubai after four years of ceasing operations in the UAE. Also in November 2023, the airline announced plans to operate a flight on 28 November between London Heathrow and New York City using 100 per cent sustainable aviation fuel. The flight was operated on the airline's Boeing 787-9. The flight was successful and made it to New York from London on 28 November 2023. Because it was a test flight, there were no fare-paying passengers.

On 19 May 2024, it was reported that approximately 200 former cabin crew were suing Virgin Atlantic for unfair dismissal during the redundancy process following the COVID-19 pandemic. It was reported that they protected over 350 new hires who had only completed approximately 1 week of training out of 6 weeks rather than keep experienced older staff who had been with the airline for over 20 years.

== Corporate affairs ==
=== Offices ===
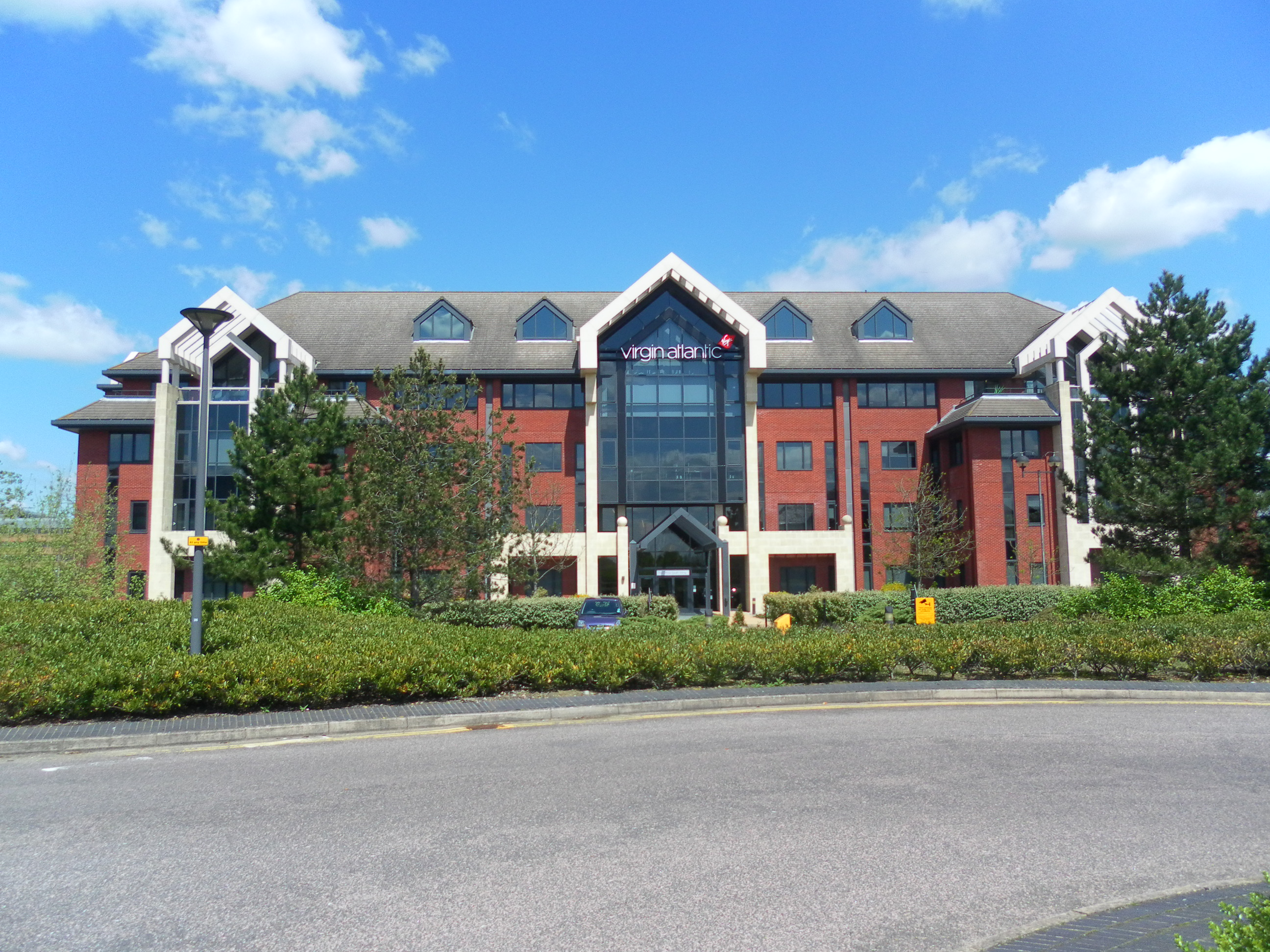
The former head office building The Office in Crawley

Virgin Atlantic's head office, known as The VHQ, is located on a business park in Crawley, England, near Gatwick Airport and also houses the corporate offices of Virgin Holidays. The company operates several offices and call centres around the United Kingdom, including a large office in Swansea, Wales, which is a base for reservations, sales, baggage claims and tracing, 'live chat' web support and a customer relations department.

International offices are located at Atlanta, Barbados, Greater Delhi, Johannesburg, Lagos and Shanghai.

=== Ownership ===
In December 1999, Virgin Group agreed a deal to sell a 49% stake in the airline to Singapore Airlines for £600 million. The transaction was completed on 30 March 2000.

On 14 May 2008, Singapore Airlines formally announced an invitation for offers for its Virgin Atlantic stake, and publicly acknowledged that its stake in the airline had underperformed.

In November 2010, Virgin Atlantic appointed Deutsche Bank to begin a strategic review of options for the airline following the tie-up between British Airways and American Airlines. By February 2011, it was confirmed that SkyTeam members Air France–KLM and Delta Air Lines had appointed Goldman Sachs to advise them on a joint potential approach for Virgin Atlantic. Etihad Airways was also reported to be considering a deal, and Willie Walsh, chief executive of International Airlines Group, stated that they would be interested in the airline, but only for the lucrative take-off and landing slots it holds at Heathrow Airport.

On 11 December 2012, Delta Air Lines announced it had agreed terms to purchase Singapore Airlines' 49% stake in Virgin Atlantic for £224 million, with plans to develop a transatlantic joint venture. Regulatory approval from the United States and European Union was granted on 20 June 2013, and the purchase was completed on 24 June. In December 2012, International Airlines Group CEO, Willie Walsh, suggested that the loss-making company would be history within five years. "I can't see Delta wanting to operate the Virgin brand because if they do what does that say about the Delta brand? I just don't see that the guy [Branson] has anything that stands out in terms of what he has achieved in the industry."

In July 2017, Virgin Group agreed to sell a 31% stake in the airline to Air France-KLM for £220 million, leaving it with a 20% holding. The deal fell through in late 2019.

The airline along with Virgin Holidays is controlled by a holding company, Virgin Atlantic Limited, which is 51% owned by the Virgin Group and 49% by Delta Air Lines. It is administratively separate from other Virgin-branded airlines. Virgin Atlantic Airways Limited and Virgin Atlantic International Limited both hold Civil Aviation Authority (CAA) Type A Operating Licences (AOC numbers 534 and 2435 respectively), both of which permit these airlines, operating as Virgin Atlantic Airways, to carry passengers, cargo, and mail on aircraft with 20 or more seats.

=== Senior leadership ===
- Chairman: Josh Bayliss (since June 2026)
- Chief executive: Corneel Koster (since January 2026)

==== List of former chairmen ====
1. Randolph Fields (1984–1985)
2. Sir Richard Branson (1985–2012)
3. Peter Norris (2012–2026)

==== List of former chief executives ====
1. Sir Richard Branson (1984–2001)
2. Steve Ridgway (2001–2013)
3. Craig Kreeger (2013–2018)
4. Shai Weiss (2019–2025)

=== Business trends ===
The key trends for Virgin Atlantic are shown below (from 2014 onwards, figures are for year ending December; earlier figures are for year ending February, and exclude Virgin Nigeria operations 2005–2008):

	2007	2008	2009	2010	2011	2012	2013	2014	2015	2016	2017	2018	2019	2020	2021	2022	2023	2024
Turnover (£m)	1,630	2,337	2,579	2,357	2,700	2,740	2,870	2,828	2,782	2,689	2,664	2,781	2,927	868	928	2,854	3,118	3,301
Profit (EBT) (£m)	68.0	22.9	68.4	−132.0	18.5	−80.2	−69.9	−174.7	87.5	23.0	−28.4	−12.8	−63.7	-659	-594	-341.6	-224.6	-95.9
Net profit (£m)									80.1	187.3	−65.6	−38.4	−54.7	−864.1	-486	-515	-110.7	-144.1
Number of employees (average monthly)						c.9,000	9,580	9,231	9,005	8,875	8,303	8,571	10,051	7,437	6,500	6,532	7,342	7,629
Total flights	21,344	22,149	20,735	19,484	20,519	21,033	28,373	29,710	27,147	21,883				6 673	7 966	21,835	23,720	24,832
Number of passengers (m)	5.7	5.8	5.5	5.5	5.3	5.4	5.5	6.1	5.7	5.4	5.3	5.4	5.9	1.2	1.1	4.4	5.3	5.6
Passenger load factor (%)	76.5	76.9	78.9	82.5	77.5	78.1	77.4	79.3	76.8	78.7	78.3	78.6	81.0	61.1	49.3	73.4	77.0	77.0
Number of aircraft (at year end)						40	40	39	40	39	39	46	45	37		38	40	45
Notes/sources																		

=== Service concept ===
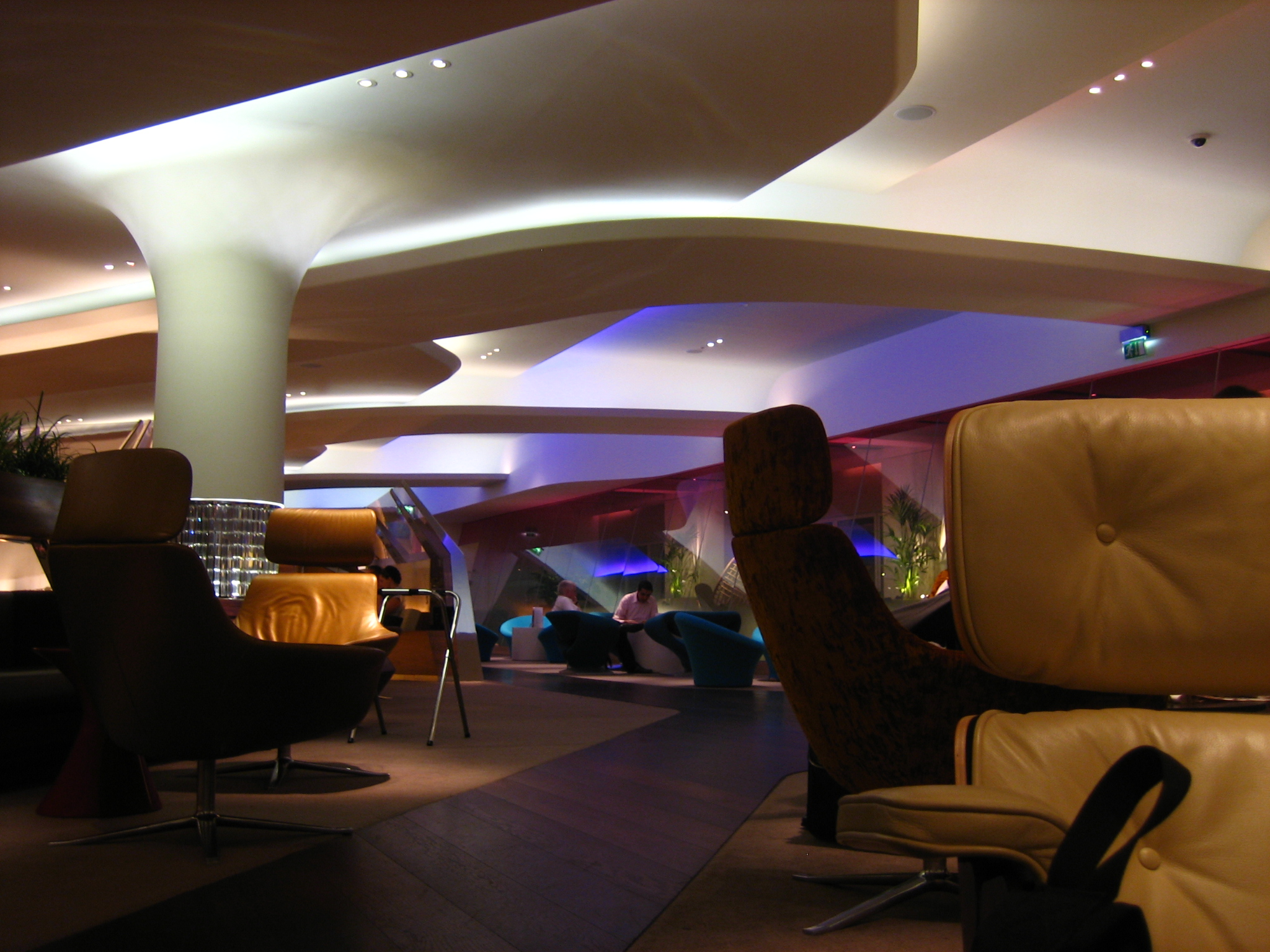
Clubhouse lounge at Heathrow Airport

Virgin Atlantic aircraft operate with a three-class cabin configuration: Economy, Premium (formerly Premium Economy), and Upper Class - the business class product. Premium has a separate check-in area, priority boarding and a wider seat with more legroom. Upper Class features a seat that converts into a fully flat bed and access to a private check in area (called the Upper Class Wing at London Heathrow). Virgin Atlantic was the first airline to offer personal entertainment for all passengers in all classes.

The airline's frequent-flyer program is styled 'the Flying Club'.

Virgin Atlantic operate five airport lounges branded as 'Clubhouses' at London Heathrow, John F. Kennedy International Airport in New York, Dulles International Airport in Washington, D.C., San Francisco International Airport and O. R. Tambo International Airport in Johannesburg.

=== Little Red ===
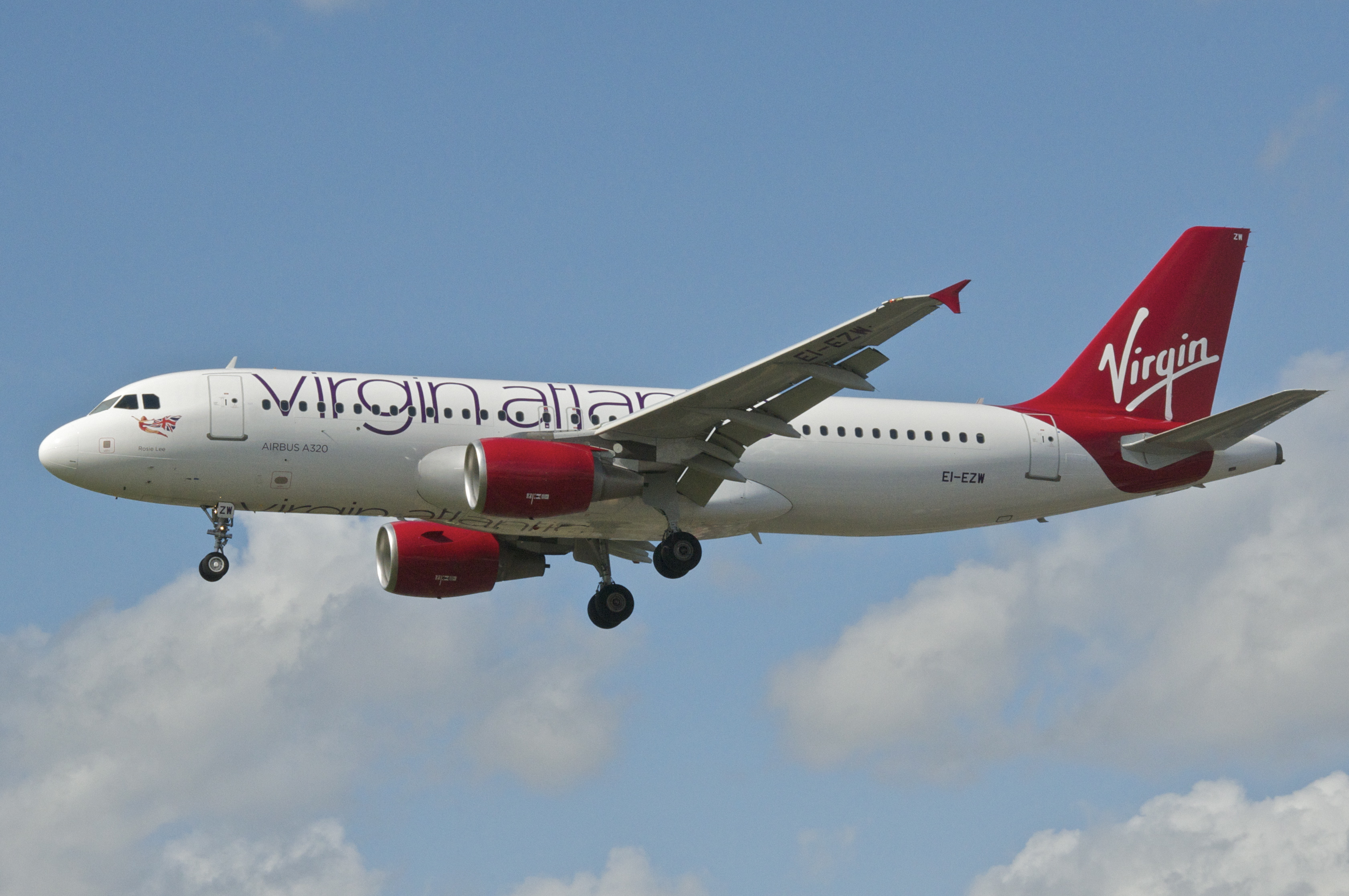
Virgin Atlantic Airbus A320-200 Little Red operated by Aer Lingus

British Midland International provided domestic and European feeder traffic into Heathrow Airport in partnership with Virgin until it was purchased by British Airways' parent company International Airlines Group in 2011. The Lufthansa-owned airline had faced heavy annual losses of more than £100 million. Under the terms of the takeover, IAG had to relinquish some former BMI domestic slots at Heathrow. Virgin Atlantic purchased enough slots in 2012 to enable it to launch a domestic service on 31 March 2013, under the Little Red brand, operating a total of 12 daily services from London to Aberdeen (three), Edinburgh (six), and Manchester (three). The airline wet-leased four Airbus Airbus A320-200s from Aer Lingus, operating with Virgin Atlantic livery, under a three-year contract.

In September 2014, it was reported that Virgin Atlantic was considering closing its domestic brand after suffering heavy losses, with Civil Aviation Authority figures confirming an average seat occupancy level of just 37.6% in 2013. The 12 daily pairs of take-off and landing slots at Heathrow cannot be sold to be used for long-haul routes.

On 6 October 2014, Virgin Atlantic confirmed that the Little Red service would cease; flights to Manchester ended on 28 March 2015 and flights to Edinburgh and Aberdeen ended on 26 September 2015.

=== Virgin Atlantic International Limited ===
On 13 April 2015, Virgin Atlantic incorporated a new subsidiary – Virgin Atlantic International Limited. In November 2015, the subsidiary obtained its own Air Operators Certificate and Operating Licence, and commenced operations with two former Virgin Atlantic Airways Limited operated Airbus A330-300 aircraft taking over routes previously operated by Virgin Atlantic Limited between London Gatwick and Barbados, St Lucia, Antigua, Grenada and Tobago. These flights are operated on behalf of Virgin Atlantic.

Upon incorporation as an AOC holder, the majority of Virgin Atlantic's landing slots at London Heathrow Airport were transferred to Virgin Atlantic International Limited, allowing Virgin Atlantic to access the value of the carriers' slots by 'mortgaging' them through open investment from capital markets.

=== Flybe takeover bid ===
On 11 January 2019, Virgin Atlantic formed the Connect Airways consortium with Stobart Aviation and Cyrus Capital, to make a takeover bid for Flybe. The deal would see the consortium combine Flybe and Stobart Air with Virgin Atlantic to create an integrated carrier operating under the Virgin Atlantic brand. Flybe and Stobart Air would however retain their own Air Operator Certificates. On 15 January 2019, Connect Airways announced an increased offer, which Flybe's board accepted. On 21 February 2019, the Flybe Group confirmed that its operating assets, including the airline and the website, had indeed been transferred to Connect Airways, despite a last-minute rival bid. However, despite the investment of £135 million from Connect Airways into Flybe, the airline filed for administration and ceased operations with immediate effect in March 2020, following reduced demand that Virgin Atlantic attributed to the COVID-19 pandemic and the UK government failing to grant a £100 million loan.

=== Gender-neutral ticketing and uniforms ===
In September 2022, Virgin Atlantic announced the introduction of two new sets of uniforms, designed by Vivienne Westwood, as well as a new policy to embrace the concept of gender neutrality. She worked closely with Richard Branson to design a uniform comprises a bright red skirt suit and high-heeled shoes, and the other a burgundy-coloured trouser suit with a grey waistcoat, red tie and flat black shoes. Staff will be allowed to choose either uniform, and may also choose to wear a badge indicating their preferred pronoun of address. The new uniforms are for crew, pilots and ground staff.

At the same time, the company is making changes to its ticketing systems to allow those holding passports which indicate gender-neutrality to be entered as “U” or “X”, as well as offering a new title of address, “Mx”, on their reservations. At this time, not all countries offer this option on passports; those that do include India, Pakistan, Nepal, Australia, Canada, Argentina, Colombia, Germany, Ireland, and Iceland.

== Destinations ==
=== Codeshare agreements ===
Virgin Atlantic has codeshare agreements with the following airlines:

- Aeroméxico
- Air France (Joint Venture Partner)
- Air New Zealand
- China Eastern Airlines
- Delta Air Lines (Joint Venture Partner)
- El Al
- IndiGo
- Kenya Airways
- KLM (Joint Venture Partner)
- Korean Air
- LATAM Airlines
- Middle East Airlines
- Saudia
- Scandinavian Airlines
- Singapore Airlines
- Vietnam Airlines
- Virgin Australia
- WestJet

=== Interline agreements ===
Virgin Atlantic has interline agreements with the following airlines:

- Aegean Airlines
- Aer Lingus
- Air India
- Air Malta
- Air Serbia
- Airlink
- British Airways
- Bulgaria Air
- Caribbean Airlines
- flydubai
- Hawaiian Airlines
- Hong Kong Airlines
- Icelandair
- ITA Airways
- Scandinavian Airlines
- TAP Air Portugal
- TAROM
- Turkish Airlines
- XiamenAir

== Fleet ==
=== Twin-engined transition ===
Virgin Atlantic's early long-haul fleet was built around four-engined aircraft, principally the Boeing 747 and Airbus A340. As long-haul airline economics shifted in favour of more fuel-efficient twin-engined wide-body aircraft, the airline replaced its quadjets with types such as the Boeing 787, Airbus A350 and Airbus A330neo. Virgin Atlantic retired the last of its Airbus A340 fleet in March 2020 and, during the COVID-19 pandemic, brought forward the retirement of its Boeing 747-400 fleet.

As of July 2026, Virgin Atlantic's published fleet pages listed only the Airbus A330-300, Airbus A330neo, Airbus A350-1000 and Boeing 787-9, all twin-engined aircraft. Its 2024 fleet-transformation plan called for the remaining A330-300s to be replaced by A330-900s by 2028. By contrast, British Airways continued to operate four-engined Airbus A380 aircraft, with 12 in its fleet.

The A330-300 is a wide-body airliner manufactured by Airbus. The oldest model in the fleet, the first was delivered in April 2011, with older aircraft due to be retired and replaced by the A330-900 from 2027. Virgin Atlantic operates 7 of these aircraft as of June 2025.

The A330-900, part of the Airbus A330neo family, is a newer, more fuel efficient version of the original A330ceo. The first was delivered in October 2022, In July 2024, Virgin Atlantic placed an order for an additional 7 aircraft, with deliveries due from 2027.

The A350-1000 XWB is a wide-body airliner manufactured by Airbus. Virgin Atlantic took delivery of its first A350 in August 2019.

The 787-9 Dreamliner is a wide-body airliner manufactured by Boeing. The only Boeing model currently in the fleet, Virgin's first Dreamliner was delivered in October 2014. They operate 17 of these aircraft as of June 2025.

On 17 June 2019, at the Paris Air Show, Virgin Atlantic announced an order for 14 Airbus A330-900 aircraft, which will replace the A330ceo models starting in 2021.

== Livery ==
Virgin Atlantic's first aircraft were painted with a "Eurowhite" design with a red stripe through the centre of the main deck windows. The engines were metallic silver and the tail red with the logo in white. In the 1990s, the refreshed design was introduced, removing the centre red stripe through the windows, engines were painted red, the Virgin Atlantic titles in grey were added along the main fuselage, and the 'Flying Lady' was introduced to the nose area.

In October 2006, with the delivery of G-VRED, Virgin Atlantic introduced a new design, with the fuselage painted in metallic silver and a revised tail fin, with red and purple features and the logo. Near the nose of each aircraft is a pin-up girl, the "Scarlet Lady", carrying a Union flag, which was designed by British artist Ken White, who modelled the motif on the World War II pin-ups of Alberto Vargas – hence the naming one of the fleet Varga Girl (in this case, an A340-600 registered G-VGAS).

Each aircraft has a name, usually feminine, such as Ladybird, Island Lady, and Ruby Tuesday, but some are linked to registrations (e.g. G-VFIZ became Bubbles). A couple are commemorative names (e.g. G-VEIL—Queen of the Skies—which was named by Queen Elizabeth II on 7 April 2004, marking the centenary of the Entente Cordiale; this frame exited the fleet in April 2016. In January 2023, a new airframe — an Airbus A330-900 registered G-VEII — was christened Queen of the Skies in honour of the monarch). An exception is Spirit of Sir Freddie. An early Boeing 747, it was named in honour of Freddie Laker of Laker Airways, who helped Virgin Atlantic following the demise of his own airline. G-VFAB—Lady Penelope—gained a special livery to celebrate Virgin Atlantic's 21st birthday. G-VFAB, Lady Penelope, exited the fleet in September 2015 after 21 years of service and was subsequently parted out. In 2006, the airline ran an eBay auction to name an Airbus A340-600, registered G-VYOU. The winner named it Emmeline Heaney after his newborn daughter, and the name adorned the aircraft for the remainder of its operating service until the aircraft was retired in October 2019. In 2018, a previously stored Airbus A340-600 registered G-VNAP was returned to active use by Virgin Atlantic, and was renamed from Sleeping Beauty to Sleeping Beauty Rejuvenated. It additionally received a special "thank you" livery dedicated to its 9,000 employees.

The current livery dates from 2010 and returns to the "Eurowhite" design featuring purple billboard titles on the fuselage, slight changes to the Scarlet Lady, and new red metallic paint for the aircraft's tail and engines. On aircraft that have winglets, the wingtips are red, with the logo on the inside facing passengers on board. The Virgin Atlantic logo was also added in purple billboard titles to the underside of the aircraft.

In anticipation of the Airbus A350-1000's introduction to the airline's fleet, Virgin Atlantic announced in April 2019 that its Flying Lady mascot to be adorned on the A350's nose would be replaced by illustrations referred to as Flying Icons, consisting of a range of five individual characters in an effort to represent modern Britain. Each of the characters, separately named Daley, Meera, Oscar, Ray, and Zadie, were styled and posed with Union flags similarly to the Flying Lady. Originally portraying the characters in leotards, the illustrations were later revised by designer Toby Tinsley to instead portray the characters wearing more clothing and revealing less skin, prior to their application on Virgin Atlantic's first A350. Meera, one of the first five characters, was also at some point changed to or replaced by Mei, a new character portraying a Chinese woman. Reasons for the changes or revisions were not provided by Virgin Atlantic or anyone involved in the branding. At least one additional Flying Icon was unveiled to complement the initial five, including an icon portraying an Indian woman, named Aria.

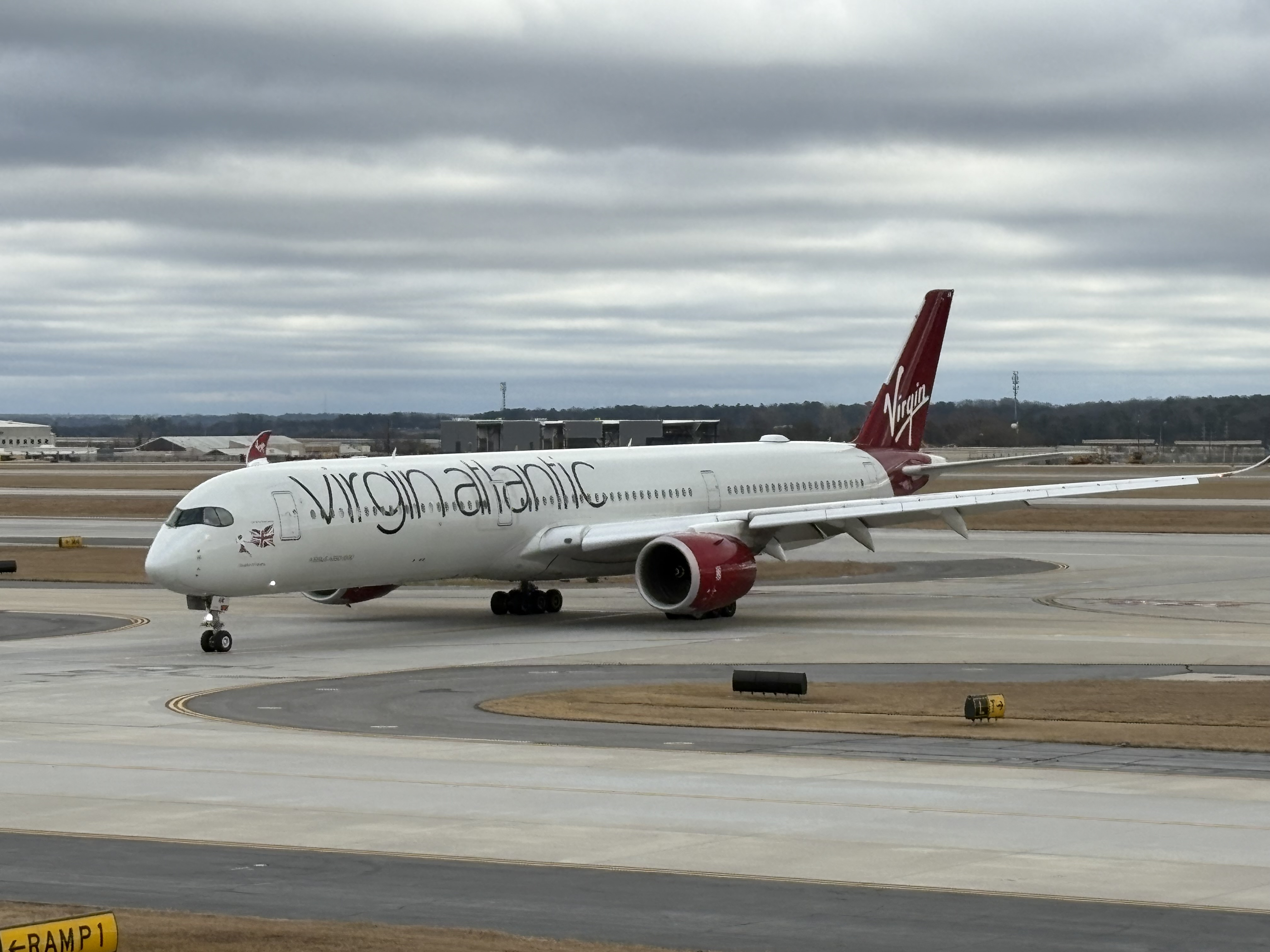
Virgin Atlantic Airbus A350-1000 G-VJAM arriving at the Hartsfield–Jackson Atlanta International Airport

== Incidents and accidents ==
Virgin Atlantic is considered to have a strong safety reputation. Since the airline's founding in 1984, it has never suffered a complete hull-loss incident or a passenger fatality.

- On 5 November 1997, after numerous attempts to shake free the jammed main landing gear of an Airbus A340-300 (G-VSKY) failed, the aircraft en route from Los Angeles to Heathrow made an emergency landing at Heathrow Airport. The aircraft sustained major damage to the undersides of engines one, two, and four, which made contact with the runway surface during landing. The runway surface was also damaged and several runway lights were broken as the right main landing gear wheels broke up during the deceleration. The aircraft was evacuated safely. Two crew members and five passengers sustained minor injuries during the evacuation.
- On 8 February 2005, on board an Airbus A340-600 aircraft (G-VATL) en route from Hong Kong to Heathrow, the fuel control computer system caused a loss of automatic fuel transfer between tanks. The pilots diverted to Amsterdam and landed safely. The interim accident report made four safety recommendations addressed to the primary certification bodies for large transport category aircraft (EASA and the FAA), advising on the need for a low-fuel warning system for large aircraft.
- On 11 August 2011, Virgin Atlantic flight VS52, a Boeing 747-400 (G-VXLG) operating from Tobago-A.N.R. Robinson International Airport to London Gatwick Airport sustained minor damage in a taxiing incident. The aeroplane was taxiing out towards the departure runway at Tobago-A.N.R. Robinson International Airport when it entered a taxiway that was closed for construction activity. One of the wheels partly sank through the concrete. This resulted in the Boeing 747-400 becoming stuck.
- On 29 December 2014, a Boeing 747-400 (G-VROM) operating a flight from London Gatwick Airport to McCarran International Airport (now Harry Reid International Airport) in Las Vegas, Nevada, as Virgin Atlantic Flight 43, returned to Gatwick following an indication that the far right main landing gear was stuck inside the aircraft. The Boeing 747-400 landed safely on runway 26L at Gatwick without further incident. Investigators found that an actuator in the landing gear was installed inverted, sticking the landing gear leg sideways and could not be extended. There were no injuries to the 465 people on board and the aircraft returned to service on 11 January 2015.
- On 15 March 2021, Virgin Atlantic flight 453 operated by a Boeing 787-9 en route to Tel Aviv from Heathrow was forced to return to Heathrow after the aircraft was subject to a laser attack from the ground during take-off. The flight crew issued an emergency Pan call whilst flying over Paris after the captain lost sight in one eye. No other injuries were reported.
- On 2 May 2022, Virgin Atlantic flight VS3, callsign VIR3N operated by an Airbus A330-343 (G-VWAG) was bound for New York's John F. Kennedy Airport from London Heathrow Airport when it was forced to turn around over Ireland approximately 35 minutes after takeoff. This was due to a rostering error leading to the First Officer operating the flight before they had fully completed their company training. The CAA confirmed that the First Officer in question is a fully qualified pilot and no risk to safety or wrongdoing took place. Virgin confirmed it was an internal training incident and swiftly replaced the first officer to allow the flight to resume shortly after.
- On 6 April 2024, there was a ground collision involving a British Airways plane with 121 passengers on board and a Boeing 787 plane. Heathrow said there were no injuries and no delays but both aircraft suffered wing damage.

== See also ==
- Air transport in the United Kingdom
- List of airlines in the United Kingdom
- Transport in the United Kingdom
