= List of public art in the London Borough of Hillingdon =

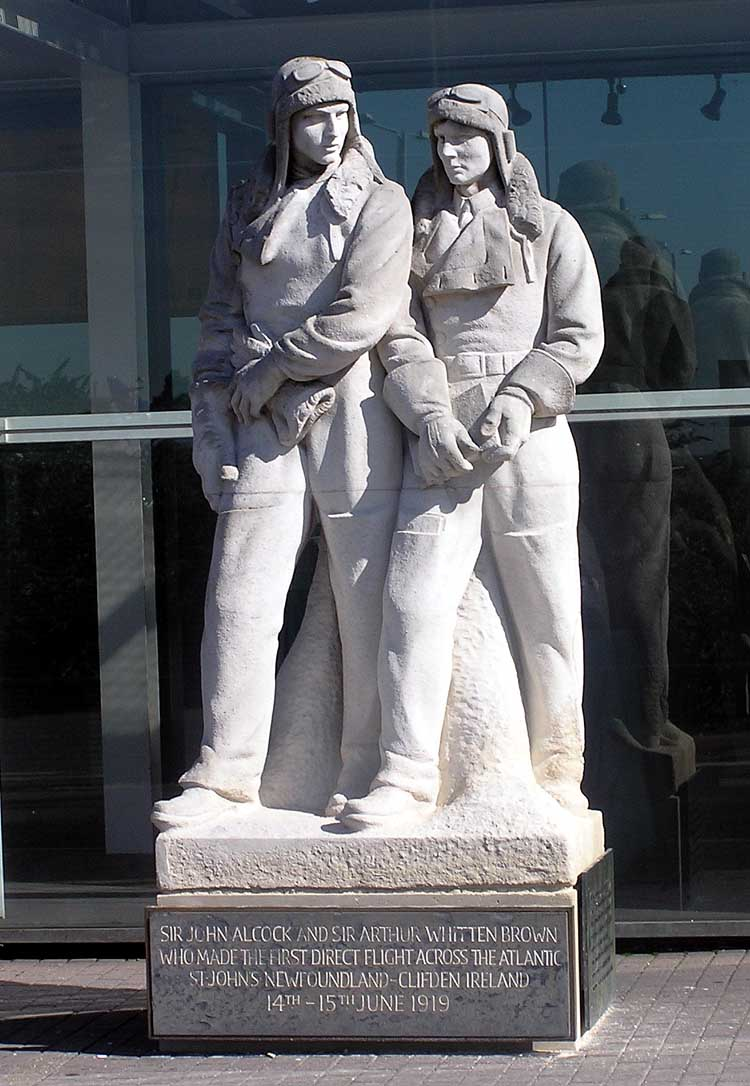
John Alcock and Arthur Brown (1954) by William McMillan in front of the Heathrow Academy which provides vocational and specialist theory courses

This is a list of public art in the London Borough of Hillingdon.

== Eastcote ==
Image	Title / subject	Location and coordinates	Date	Artist / designer	Type	Designation	Notes
	Eastcote War Memorial	Memorial Gardens, Field End Road	1921	Louis Frederick Roslyn and Edmund John Shelmerdine	Memorial cross	—N/a	Unveiled 12 June 1921.
	Coat of arms of Middlesex	East façade of Eastcote Library, Field End Road 51.5805°N 0.4003°W	1959	Municipal works team of Middlesex County Council			

== Harefield ==
Image	Title / subject	Location and coordinates	Date	Artist / designer	Type	Designation	Notes
More images	Harefield War Memorial	The Green 51.6041°N 0.4803°W	1921	Frederick Herbert Mansford	Obelisk	Grade II	
	Making Space	Heart Science Centre, Magdi Yacoub Institute	2004	Antony Gormley	Sculpture	—N/a	
	Prometheus Magdi Yacoub	Harefield Hospital 51.6069°N 0.4828°W	2008	Pavlos Angelos Kougioumtzis	Statue	—N/a	Unveiled 21 November 2008 by Gordon Brown.
	Harefield village green main (globe) sign	The Green (public green) partly facing the south end of the large hospital site 51.603°N 0.484°W	2008		Circular (band) sign and finial-style statue	—N/a	Hare as in the name of the place. Australia and Britain due to the injured treated at the large hospital in World War I.

== Harmondsworth ==
Image	Title / subject	Location and coordinates	Date	Artist / designer	Type	Designation	Notes
	Royal Canadian Air Force Memorial	Harmondsworth Moor 51.4901°N 0.4893°W	1995		Memorial stone with plaque		
	The Hurdler	Forecourt of the Lodge, Harmondsworth Lane	1984	Diana Thomson	Sculpture	—N/a	Commissioned by APC International and inspired by the 1984 Summer Olympics, the sculpture later became the basis for the company's logo.

== Heathrow Airport ==
Image	Title / subject	Location and coordinates	Date	Artist / designer	Type	Designation	Notes
	Anglo-French Survey (1784–1790) baseline: the northern of its two commemorative cannons	West of where Nene Road meets Northern Perimeter Road, being at one of the places known as "King's Arbour" (a notably large tree). 51.47980°N 0.4502°W	1791	William Mudge		Grade II	The corresponding south cannon is next to LEH School, Hampton.
	Alcock and Brown	Newall Road, on north side of the airport 51.48053°N 0.4433°W	1954	William McMillan	Sculptural group	—N/a	
	Custom Shed Screen	Custom House, Nene Road	1967	Robert Adams	Screens	—N/a	
	Speedbird motifs	Hatton Cross tube station 51°27′59.83″N 0°25′24″W	1975	After Theyre Lee-Elliott	Mosaics	—N/a	
	Atlas	Outside the Compass Centre, Northern Perimeter Road West	c. 1993	Hylton Stockwell	Sculpture	—N/a	
	Moving World (Night & Day)	Terminal 5 51.47322°N 0.48938°W	2008	Langlands & Bell	Pair of illuminated neon and steel walls	—N/a	
	Animated Crest	Terminal 5 51°28′17.71″N 0°29′17.23″W	2008	Christopher Pearson		—N/a	
	Oak Seasons	Terminal 5 51°28′17.71″N 0°29′17.23″W	2008	Christopher Pearson		—N/a	
More images	Emirates A380 sculpture	At north access to/from Terminals 2 & 3 access tunnel 51.48061°N 0.4530°W	2008	Penwal		—N/a	
	Cloud	Terminal 5 51°28′17.71″N 0°29′17.23″W	2008	Troika	Sculpture	—N/a	
	All the Time in the World	Terminal 5 51°28′17.71″N 0°29′17.23″W	2008	Troika		—N/a	
	Yan Shu (swan letter)	Terminal 5 51°28′17.71″N 0°29′17.23″W	2008	UnitedVisualArtists	Sculpture	—N/a	
	Sculpture marking the 150th anniversary of the London Underground	Ticket hall at Heathrow Terminals 2 & 3 tube station 51°28′16.67″N 0°27′8.64″W	2013		Sculpture	—N/a	
	Turkish Airlines Globe	Near main access tunnel, on central roundabout (between Terminals 2 & 3) 51.47189°N 0.4531°W	2013		Sculpture	—N/a	
	London Taxi	Terminal 2 51°28′10.62″N 0°27′4.87″W	2014	Benedict Radcliffe	Sculpture	—N/a	
More images	Slipstream	Terminal 2 51°28′10.8″N 0°26′58.8″W	2014	Richard Wilson	Sculpture	—N/a	

== Hayes ==
Image	Title / subject	Location and coordinates	Date	Artist / designer	Type	Designation	Notes
	Hayes War Memorial	Church Road 51.51766°N 0.419146°W	Post-World War II	?	Wooden Calvary on raised stone plinth with brick surrounding walls and carved inscriptions	—N/a	
	Skylark	Lake Farm Country Park 51.51166°N 0.425146°W	c. 2002	Ben Dearnley	Sculpture	—N/a	
	Tiling	Underpass at Hayes and Harlington railway station	2003	Lubna Chowdhary		—N/a	
	The Converse Wall of Clash	Powerhouse building, Blyth Road 51°30′15.96″N 0°25′34.5″W	2014	Remi Rough and System (Agents of Change)		—N/a	
	Night scene	Norman Leddy Memorial Gardens 51.52046°N 0.423206°W		Tom "Carver" Harvey	Tree sculpture	—N/a	
	Man looking for his dog	Barra Hall Park 51.51816°N 0.423416°W		Tom "Carver" Harvey	Tree sculpture	—N/a	

=== Art installation ===
On Sunday 5 August 2012, Jeremy Deller's art installation Sacrilege (an inflatable life-size model of Stonehenge) was installed in Barra Hall Park from 10.30am to 6pm. An estimated 1,400 people visited on the day.

== Northwood ==
Image	Title / subject	Location and coordinates	Date	Artist / designer	Architect / other	Type	Designation	Notes
More images	Northwood War Memorial	Green Lane, near Northwood tube station 51.6116°N 0.4250°W	1921	William Aumonier Jr.	F. D. Bedford	Memorial cross	Grade II	Unveiled 13 February 1921.
	Green Man and town sign	Green Lane	2011	William Lee	—N/a	Sculptures	—N/a	

== Ruislip ==
Image	Title / subject	Location and coordinates	Date	Artist / designer	Type	Designation	Notes
More images	Ruislip War Memorial	Eastcote Road, opposite St Martin's Church 51.5775°N 0.4272°W	1921?	Local craftsmen	Memorial cross	—N/a	
More images	Polish Air Force Memorial Polish Air Force in Great Britain	South Ruislip 51.5488°N 0.4002°W	2 November 1948	Mieczysław Lubelski	War memorial with sculpture	Grade II*	
	Cast concrete abstract frieze	Ticket hall of South Ruislip station	c. 1961	Henry Haig	Frieze	—N/a	

== Stockley Park ==
Image	Title / subject	Location and coordinates	Date	Artist / designer	Architect / other	Type	Designation	Notes
	In the Garden	Outside 3 Roundwood Avenue, Stockley Park	1983	Peter Randall-Page	Arup Associates; Charles Funke (landscape architect)	Sculpture	—N/a	Installed here in 1992; the work was previously untitled.
	Synchronised Sculpture	Lake in front of the Arena Building, Bennetsfield Road, Stockley Park	1988	Kevin Atherton	—N/a	Sculpture	—N/a	Eight bronze legs cast from Sarah Northey, the British Synchronised Swimmer of the Year in 1987.
	Soaring American Eagle	Outside 4 Roundwood Avenue, Stockley Park	c. 1990	?	Peter Foggo Associates	Sculpture	—N/a	Commissioned by Electronic Data Systems.
	Lot's Wife	Outside 1 Furzeground Way, Stockley Park	1990	Robin Caiger-Smith	Geoffrey Darke & Associates	Sculpture	—N/a	Dow Chemicals commissioned the work, which alludes to the metamorphosis whereby brine is produced by mining salt deposits, as well as to Dow as a "forward-looking company".
	Osirisisis	Outside 5 Longwalk Road, Stockley Park	1991	Stephen Cox	Foster Associates	Sculpture	—N/a	
	Tetra Trellis	Outside 1 Longwalk Road, Stockley Park	1993	William Pye	Arup Associates	Sculpture	—N/a	Commissioned by Tetra Pak.
	Challenge	Stockley Park	1995	Wendy Taylor		Sculpture	—N/a	

== Uxbridge ==
Image	Title / subject	Location and coordinates	Date	Artist / designer	Type	Designation	Notes
	Girder from Chepstow Railway Bridge	Brunel University	1852	Isambard Kingdom Brunel	Girder	—N/a	
More images	Uxbridge War Memorial	The Old Graveyard, Windsor Street 51.5445°N 0.4808°W	1924	Adrian Jones	War memorial with sculpture	—N/a	Unveiled 11 November 1924.
	Winged wheels	Entrance to Uxbridge tube station 51.5461°N 0.4789°W	1934	Joseph Armitage	Architectural sculpture	Grade II	
	Coats of arms of the Basset family, of Middlesex and of Buckinghamshire	Exit from Uxbridge tube station 51.5462°N 0.4788°W	1934	Ervin Bossányi	Stained glass	Grade II	
	Saint Andrew's Gate	Hillingdon Road roundabout 51.5439°N 0.4729°W	1957				
	Shoreditch College Golden Jubilee 1969	Brunel University	1969	Attributed to Philip John Whitten	Relief	—N/a	
	Anticipation Golden Jubilee of Elizabeth II	Uxbridge town centre, outside The Chimes 51.5459°N 0.4789°W	25 June 2002	Anita Lafford		—N/a	
More images	Statue of Isambard Kingdom Brunel	Brunel University 51.53307°N 0.47497°W	6 July 2006	Anthony Stones	Statue	—N/a	
	Connect	Brunel University	2016	Maria Celina Reyes Gallo, Huda Alnabhan, Abdurrahman Ozdemir and Yeqing Zheng	Sculptural group	—N/a	
	Hawker Hurricane	Outside Battle of Britain Bunker Museum, RAF Uxbridge 51.54051°N 0.464428°W			Gate guardian		
	Supermarine Spitfire	Outside Battle of Britain Bunker Museum, RAF Uxbridge 51.54031°N 0.464568°W			Gate guardian		
	Four Concrete Forms with White	Brunel University		Justin Knowles	Sculpture	—N/a	Given by Arts Council England.

== West Drayton ==
Image	Title / subject	Location and coordinates	Date	Artist / designer	Architect / other	Type	Designation	Notes
	Yiewsley and West Drayton War Memorial	Harmondsworth Road, outside the entrance to West Drayton Cemetery 51.49995°N 0.46798°W	After 1918	?	—N/a	War memorial	—N/a	

== Yiewsley ==
Image	Title / subject	Location and coordinates	Date	Artist / designer	Architect / other	Type	Designation	Notes
	Yiewsley War memorial	St Matthew's Church, Yiewsley	1921			War memorial	—N/a	Unveiled on 28 May 1921 by Lady Delia Peel
More images	Artorius	Outside Virtus London 6, Ironbridge Road North, Prologis Park West London, Yiewsley 51.5101°N 0.4524°W	1990	John Raimondi	Skidmore, Owings & Merrill	Sculpture	—N/a	

== Bibliography ==
- Lloyd, Fran; Potkin, Helen; Thackara, Davina (2011). Public Sculpture of Outer South and West London. Public Sculpture of Britain. Liverpool: Liverpool University Press.
