= Polish Air Force Memorial =

War memorial in South Ruislip, London

Coordinates: 51.548809°N 0.400239°W

- United Kingdom
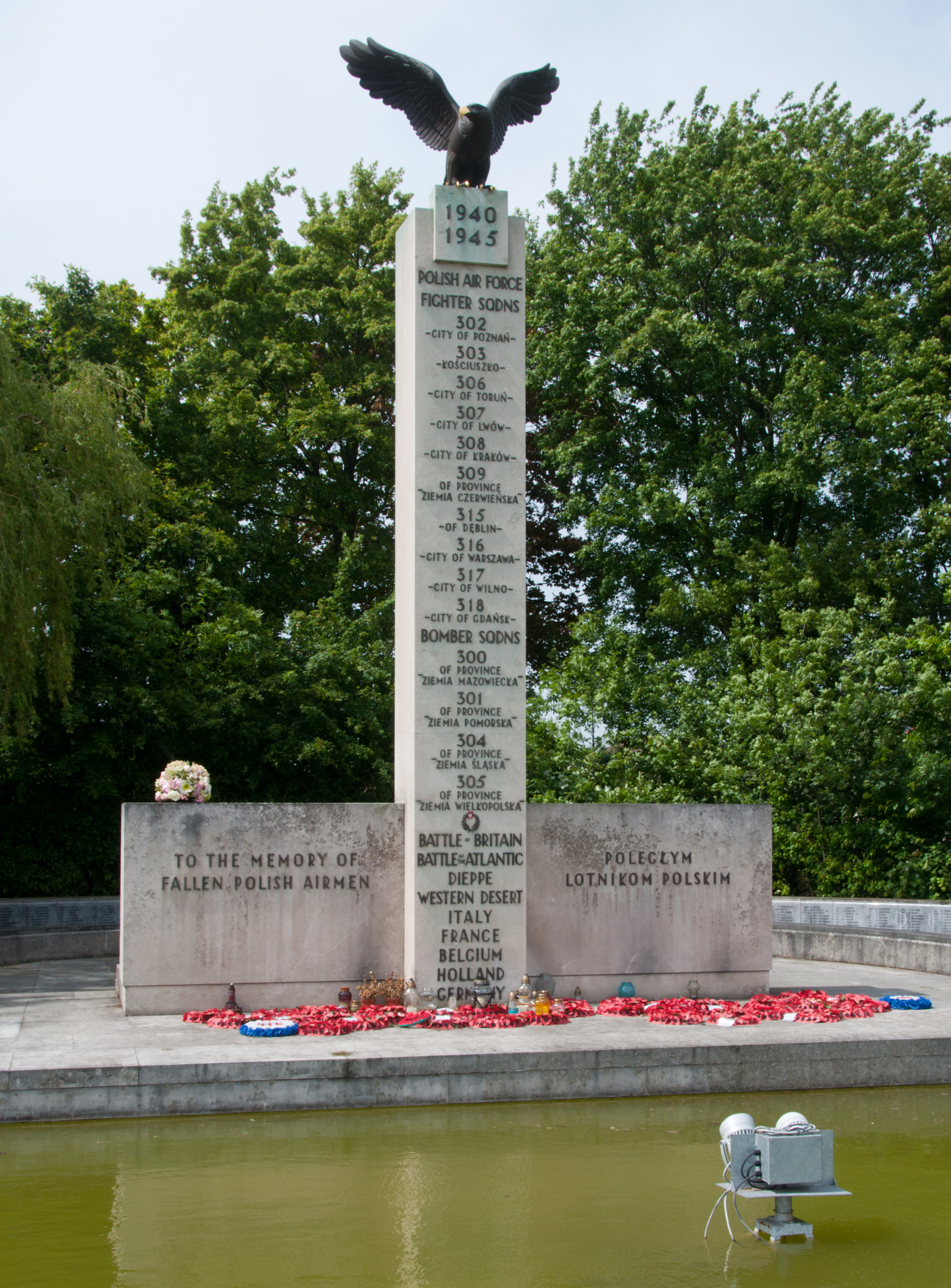
- For casualties of the Polish Air Force in the Second World War
- Unveiled: 1948
- Location: London

Listed Building – Grade II*
- Official name: Polish Air Force Memorial
- Designated: 30 August 2002 (Grade II); 8 September 2020 (Grade II*)
- Reference no.: 1088113

The Polish Air Force Memorial (informally Polish War Memorial) is a war memorial in West London, England in memory of airmen from Poland who served in the Royal Air Force as part of the Polish contribution to World War II. Over 18,000 men and women served in the Polish squadrons of the RAF during the war, and over 2,000 died. The memorial marks the southern extremity of South Ruislip in the London Borough of Hillingdon, near RAF Northolt, where seven Polish-manned fighter squadrons were based at different times in the war.

== Junction and landmark status ==
The memorial is partly next to the lesser road interfacing roundabout above the sunken A40 road (specifically for the A4180 road) and is a local landmark. The term "Polish War Memorial" commonly extends to the arterial underpass and roundabout. The precise coordinates of the eagle finial are given, to six decimal places.

== History ==
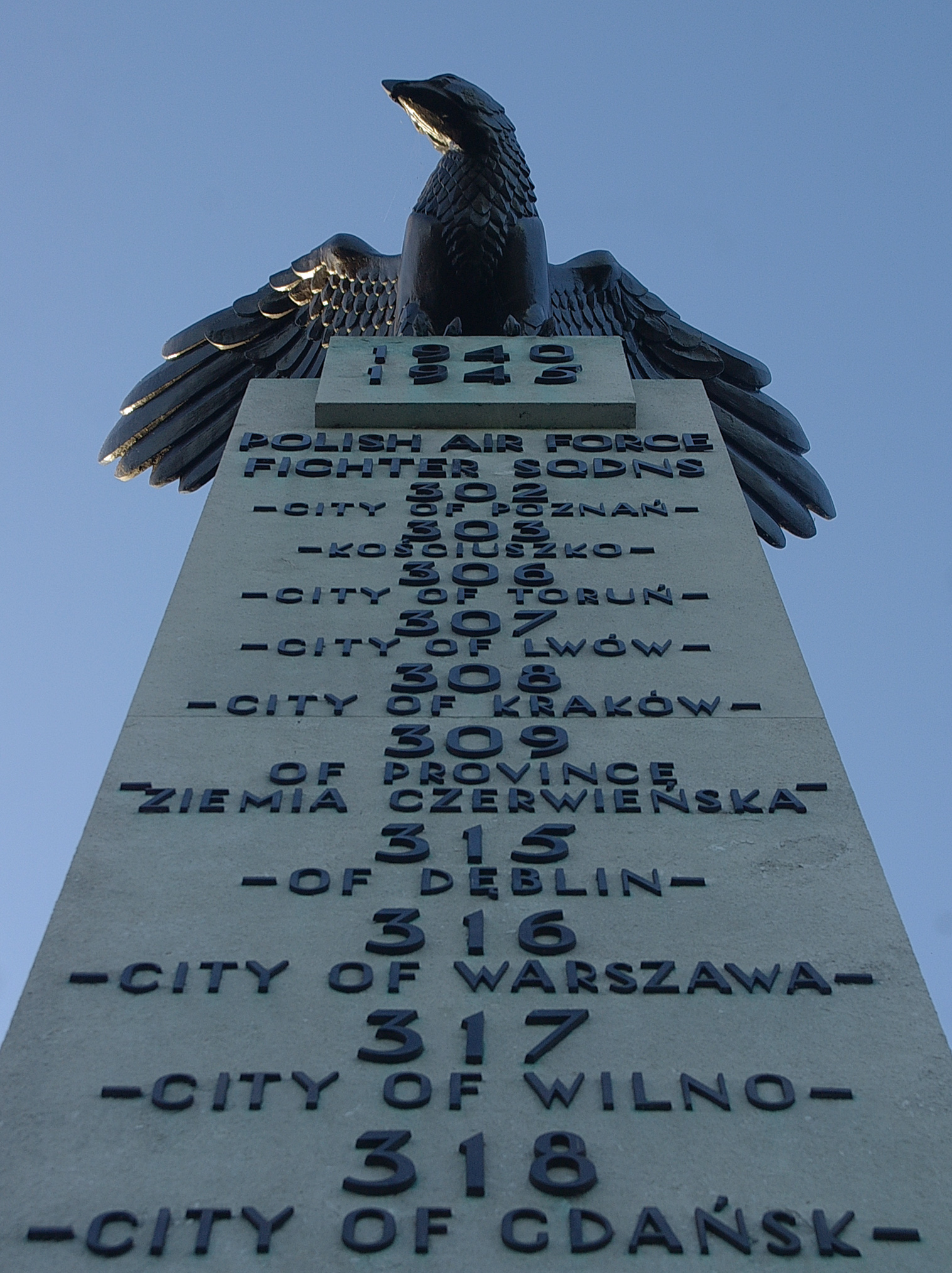
Squadron names and numbers on the monument. The cities of "Lwów" and "Wilno" are now Lviv and Vilnius respectively.

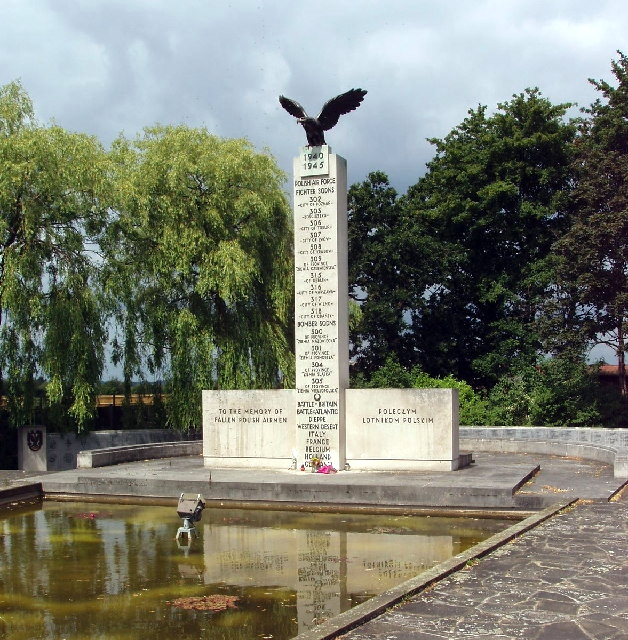
Polish War Memorial, Northolt

Officers from the Polish Air Forces in France and Great Britain who settled in Britain after the war formed the Polish Air Force Association. They decided to erect a monument and a committee, led by Air Vice Marshal Mateusz Iżycki (later naturalised as Matthew Izycki de Notto), raised the necessary funds mostly from the British public, with a campaign in The Daily Telegraph supported by William Berry, 1st Viscount Camrose, which raised over £8,000.

The monument was designed by the celebrated Polish monumental sculptor Mieczysław Lubelski, who had served in the 1944 Warsaw Uprising and been interned in a German concentration camp. He was given a budget of £3,000. The site at the edge of RAF Northolt was donated by Middlesex County Council, which took over and redeveloped the airfield for civilian use after the war.

The main elements of the memorial are made from Portland stone and polished granite with bronze lettering. A central Portland stone obelisk, with flanking Portland stone panels, stands beside a trapezoidal pool of water with fountains. The column is surmounted by a bronze Polish eagle, which is the symbol of the Polish Air Force. Bronze lettering on the column gives the dates "1940-1945" and lists the Polish fighter and bomber squadrons that served with the RAF in the Second World War. The flanking panels have inscriptions in bronze lettering: to the front, in English and Polish: "TO THE MEMORY OF / FALLEN POLISH AIRMEN" and "POLEGŁYM / LOTNIKOM POLSKIM", and across the rear, a biblical quotation from 2 Timothy 4: "I HAVE FOUGHT A GOOD FIGHT, I HAVE FINISHED MY COURSE, / I HAVE KEPT THE FAITH/ - II TIM. IV. 7."

The pool and column are surrounded by a York stone walkway, with steps to a sunken semi-circular exedra to the rear where the curved walls have further stone panels inscribed with the insignia of the 14 Polish squadrons that served with the RAF and the names of 1,243 Poles killed in the war (the inner wall with names was replaced, and the outer wall with more names and the insignia was added, in 1996). The site includes landscaped grass and flowerbeds, with poles for the flags of the UK and Poland, and is enclosed within cast iron railings and gates, supported by Portland stone pillars. The bronze eagle and lettering were cast by the Morris Singer foundry.

The completed memorial was unveiled on 2 November 1948 by one Marshal of the Royal Air Force, Arthur Tedder, 1st Baron Tedder, after a speech from a second, Charles Portal, 1st Viscount Portal of Hungerford: they were respectively the current and former Chief of the Air Staff. In his speech, Lord Portal said that it was a sad blow that many Polish veterans were unable to return home, as their country had been occupied by the Soviet Union. He added that it would be to the mutual advantage of Britons and Poles that the latter were to make their home in Britain. The unveiling was attended by August Zaleski, president of the Polish Republic in Exile, and further 3,000 dignitaries and guests. Prayers were led by the Polish Air Force Chaplain, Reverend Rafał Gogoliński-Elston.

=== Refurbishment and extension ===
Originally the names of 1,243 Polish airmen who died during the war were inscribed on the monument, all killed on active service. Subsequently, another 659 Poles were identified whose names should be on the monument. By the 1990s the monument needed refurbishment, so in 1994 an appeal was launched to fund the work. At the same time the opportunity was taken to extend the monument to add the 659 missing names, and adding 23 Polish airmen killed in the Battle of France in 1940. Deteriorating sandstone panels which listed the names of the war dead were replaced with granite, and new dedicatory panels in English and Polish were added. In 1996 the work was completed and the Duke of Gloucester rededicated the enlarged, refurbished monument.

=== Opening and upgrade ceremonies ===
The monument was unveiled in 1948. It became a Grade II listed building in 2002 and was upgraded to Grade II* in September 2020, the 75th anniversary of the end of the Second World War.

=== Presidential and prime ministerial visits ===
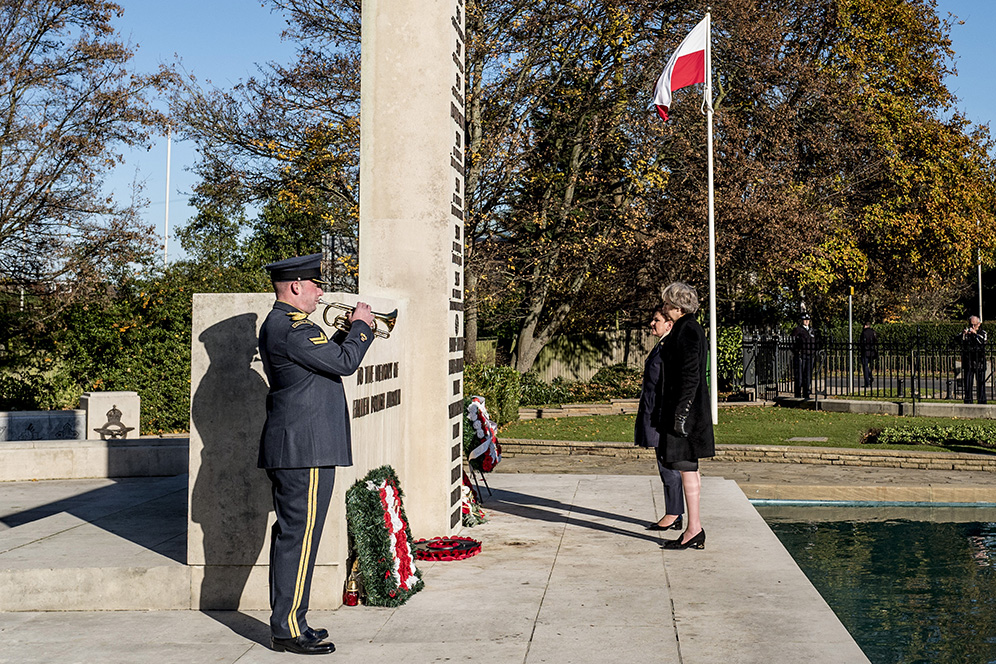
Beata Szydło and Theresa May, the Polish and British Prime Ministers respectively, at the monument in November 2016, with an RAF bandsman playing Reveille

Three Presidents of Poland have laid a wreath at the monument: Lech Wałęsa in 1991, Aleksander Kwaśniewski in 2004 and Andrzej Duda in 2015. The monument was refurbished in 2010 in time for the 70th anniversary of the Battle of Britain. In September 2012 a replica of the Polish wartime standard, the Wilno Standard, was paraded at the monument as part of a memorial ceremony. In 2016, the Prime Minister of Poland, Beata Szydło, laid a wreath at the monument, accompanied by her British counterpart Theresa May.

=== Garden ===
On 5 September 2015, to commemorate the 75th anniversary of the Battle of Britain, a Polish War Memorial Garden was opened behind the monument by the leader of Hillingdon Borough Council, Ray Puddifoot, and the Polish Ambassador to the United Kingdom, Witold Sobków. It includes a separate plaque in both English and Polish.

== Other Polish war memorials ==
Twenty-one other memorials to Polish World War II contributions exist in the UK – many near major war cemeteries – and some other cemeteries have more than one such memorial.

== Gallery ==
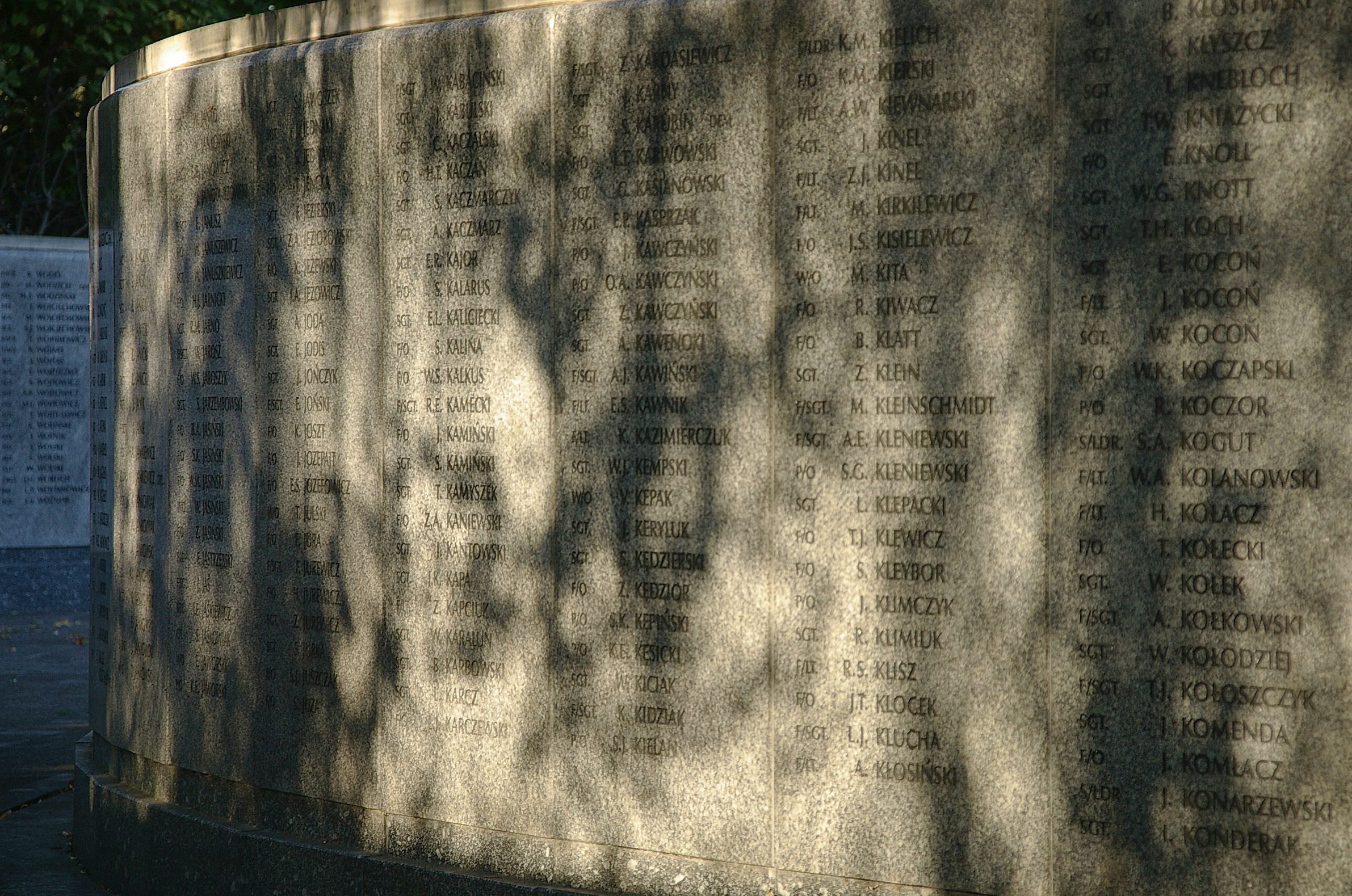
Some of the names at the rear of the monument

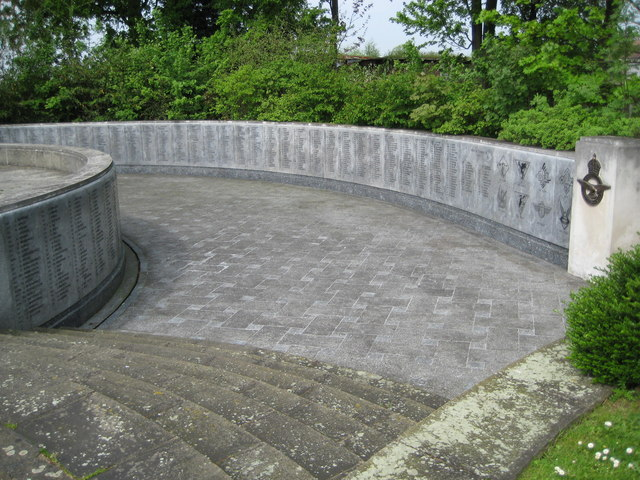
Rear sunken walkway and curved memorial walls

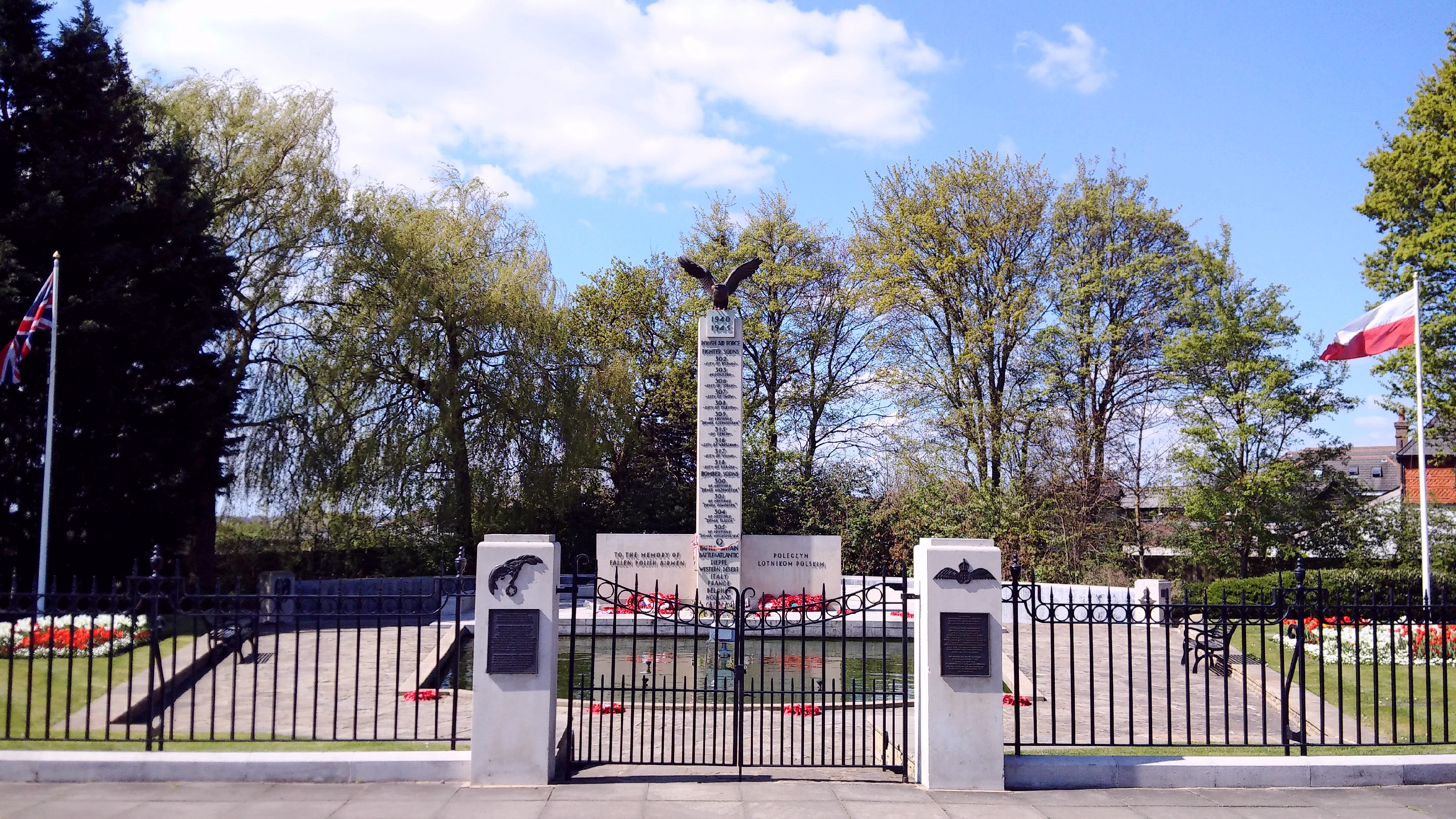
Memorial after 2010 refurbishment

== See also ==
- Grade II* listed war memorials in England
- List of public art in Hillingdon
- Polish Air Forces in France and Great Britain
