= Lake Farm Country Park =

Park in Hayes, London, England

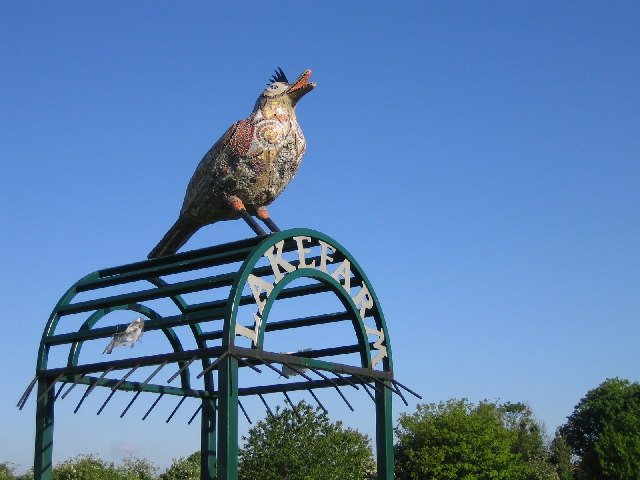
- Ben Dearnley's skylark sculpture
- Interactive map of Lake Farm Country Park
- Type: Public park
- Location: Hayes, Hillingdon, Greater London
- Coordinates: 51°30′42″N 0°25′50″W
- Created: 2002
- Operator: London Borough of Hillingdon
- Status: Open year round
- Parking: One car park

Lake Farm Country Park is an expanse of green belt land approximately 60 acres in size fringed by trees and the Grand Union Canal, situated in the south of Hayes in the London Borough of Hillingdon. Its formal status as a country park dates back to September 2002.

In 2014 an area of the park was developed as an academy school by Hillingdon Council. The development was controversial, since the site was classed as green-belt land, and several protests were held against the plans. Despite opposition, the application was approved in 2013, and construction continued throughout 2014. The school opened in late 2014.

The former common land site was located approximately 0.5 km to the south of Wood End, Hayes, immediately to the north of the canal. It was bounded by Dawley Road in the west, Botwell Common Road to the north, and Botwell Lane to the east.

The Country Park had ten formal pedestrian entrances along Dawley, Botwell Common Road, the Grand Union Canal and Botwell Lane. It also had two bridleway entrances: one off Botwell Common Road and one off Dawley Road.

== History ==
Before 1814 the area of Lake Farm formed part of Botwell Common, an unenclosed area of common land for use by the parishioners of Hayes. In 1814 the land was enclosed and divided up into a number of parcels, the greater part of the site going to John Baptist Shackle. Two large gravel pits were present on the site at this time (occupying 7 and 5 acres), in areas subsequently occupied by formal public open space. It is likely that the remnant hedges along the edges of these areas were enclosure hedges, which would have been planted around this time.

Lake Farm was so-named owing to an ornamental lake that was located beyond the north-east corner of the site, in the grounds of Lake House, which was owned by Thomas Shackle. The lake was filled in 1954.

By around 1850 the Shackle family were operating brickworks over most of the current Lake Farm site. These were backfilled with clay and other materials, and after the Second World War the site was used for the testing of radar equipment for armoured vehicles. The Thorn EMI company continued to use the site until the early 1990s and relics of the testing facilities remain on site, including a testing tower and a derelict trailer.

Much of the site was formerly managed as arable land, but was latterly entered into set aside and developed as grassland, being cut annually for hay by the agricultural tenant.

Lake Farm was formally made a country park in September 2002, after years of campaigning to save it from development.

== School development ==
On 25 February 2012 more than 100 local residents took to the streets to protest about Hillingdon Council's plan to build a primary school in the park, in open defiance of its own Green Belt policy. Hayes and Harlington MP John McDonnell led a march from the spot earmarked for the building - the green in Botwell Lane, Hayes - to the town centre. Since announcing its intentions, Hillingdon Council has stood firm in the face of public discontent, confirming in August 2012 that "the planning application [was] being tweaked."

In January 2013, a GLA report demonstrated that Hillingdon Council's plan to build on Lake Farm was in jeopardy, and London's Mayor Boris Johnson raised major concerns over the council's plan to build on Lake Farm. Transport for London also recognised that parents dropping off their children would cause major congestion and bus-service disruption.

On 5 March 2013, in a stormy council meeting, the Conservative majority of Hillingdon Council's planning committee members approved the application to build a school on the park, despite residents and Hayes ward councillors expressing their anger in the chamber. Hayes and Harlington MP John McDonnell was one of five petitioners who spoke on behalf of hundreds of campaigners to strongly oppose the idea of building on Lake Farm. Speaking after the meeting, Mr McDonnell observed: "It was not democratic, and I've never seen a council meeting descend into such a shambles . . . The council's agenda is clear - once they have built on one part, they will come back for more."

The Uxbridge Gazette reported on 24 April 2013 that London's Mayor Boris Johnson, who at the beginning of the year had raised major concerns about the idea of building on Lake Farm, would not intervene in Council plans to build a school on three hectares of green belt land, at the eastern end of Lake Farm Country Park. The Mayor's approval infuriated John McDonnell MP, who called it a "disgraceful betrayal of our local community." Conservative leader of the council Ray Puddifoot claimed: "Opponents of the scheme have been given every opportunity to come up with an alternative site, but nothing feasible has materialised so we need to press ahead with the agreed proposal."

== Flora and fauna ==
Most of the site is open grassland and shrubs, which Hillingdon Council have described as "important for wildlife". A trim trail ran through the site, which was recognisable by its skylark sculpture.

The site has a diverse habitat structure, including areas of ditch, hedgerow, grassland and ruderal/tall herbs.

Lake Farm is a popular habitat for birds. It is home to skylarks, which are included in the UK Biodiversity Action Plan for threatened species. In July 2012 birdwatchers descended on the park to catch a glimpse of a red-backed shrike, which is extremely rare in the United Kingdom.

== Facilities and features ==
The Country Park features a bird sculpture by Ben Dearnley, who came to prominence as Official Olympic Artist for London's 2012 Olympics.

Two areas of more formal open space are situated in the north-western and north-eastern corners of the park, which includes short-mown grass, planted trees and a children's play area.

Circular footpaths link in with local roads and the canal, and the area is popular for dog walking as can be seen by the presence of dog bins. There is a BMX track on the western edge of the site.

== Transport ==
=== Buses ===
The Bus route A10 and 350 use Dawley Road, and U4 and 350 use Botwell Lane. Hayes town centre is 500 metres away, with its many other regular bus services.

=== Rail ===
The closest railway station is Hayes & Harlington which is a little over 1 km walk along the canal.

=== Car ===
A car park is present off Dawley Road, which is only opened for events. Informal parking is allowed on the drive leading to the car park at other times.

== Management ==
The area has a Management Advisory Group, and a Friends of Lake Farm Country Park Group.
