= Mieczysław Lubelski =

Polish monumental sculptor (1886–1965)

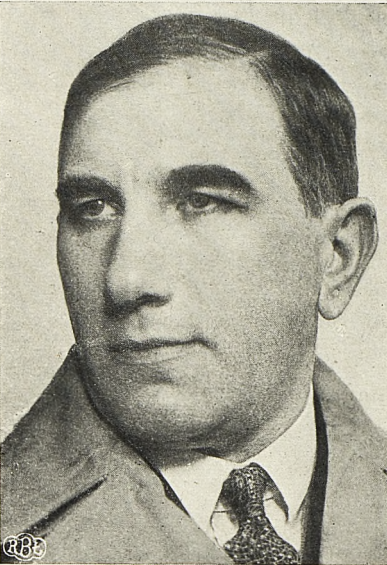
Mieczysław Lubelski in the 1920s

Mieczysław Jan Ireneusz Lubelski (30 December 1886 – 29 April 1965) was a Polish monumental sculptor and ceramicist. In Poland he was part of the Poznań-based art movement, Świt, (Dawn). He was the author of many public sculptures and monuments, as well as of Religious art in several Polish cities, many of which did not survive the war. A Holocaust survivor, he was hidden by Catholic clergy in Kielce, took part in the Warsaw Uprising and after captivity in a German POW camp, resumed the final years of his career in the United Kingdom. After World War II he became especially known for the Polish Air Force Memorial in Northolt, and for reinstating some of his shattered work in Communist Poland. He also took on interior ceramic designs for exiled Poles in London.

== Early life ==
Lubelski was the grandson of Filip Lubelski, a medical doctor and decorated officer in the Napoleonic Wars. He was born into the middle class assimilated family of Wilhelm, also a noted medical practitioner in Warsaw and Walentyna, who had converted to Protestantism, one of four children. His sister, Alina was an opera singer. His brother, Alfred, qualified as a medical doctor, but made a successful career as a cabaret artist. His youngest brother perished in Siberia during World War I. In 1906–07 Lubelski entered the Academy of Fine Arts in Warsaw, where he was a pupil of Xawery Dunikowski, and later studied in Berlin.

== Career ==
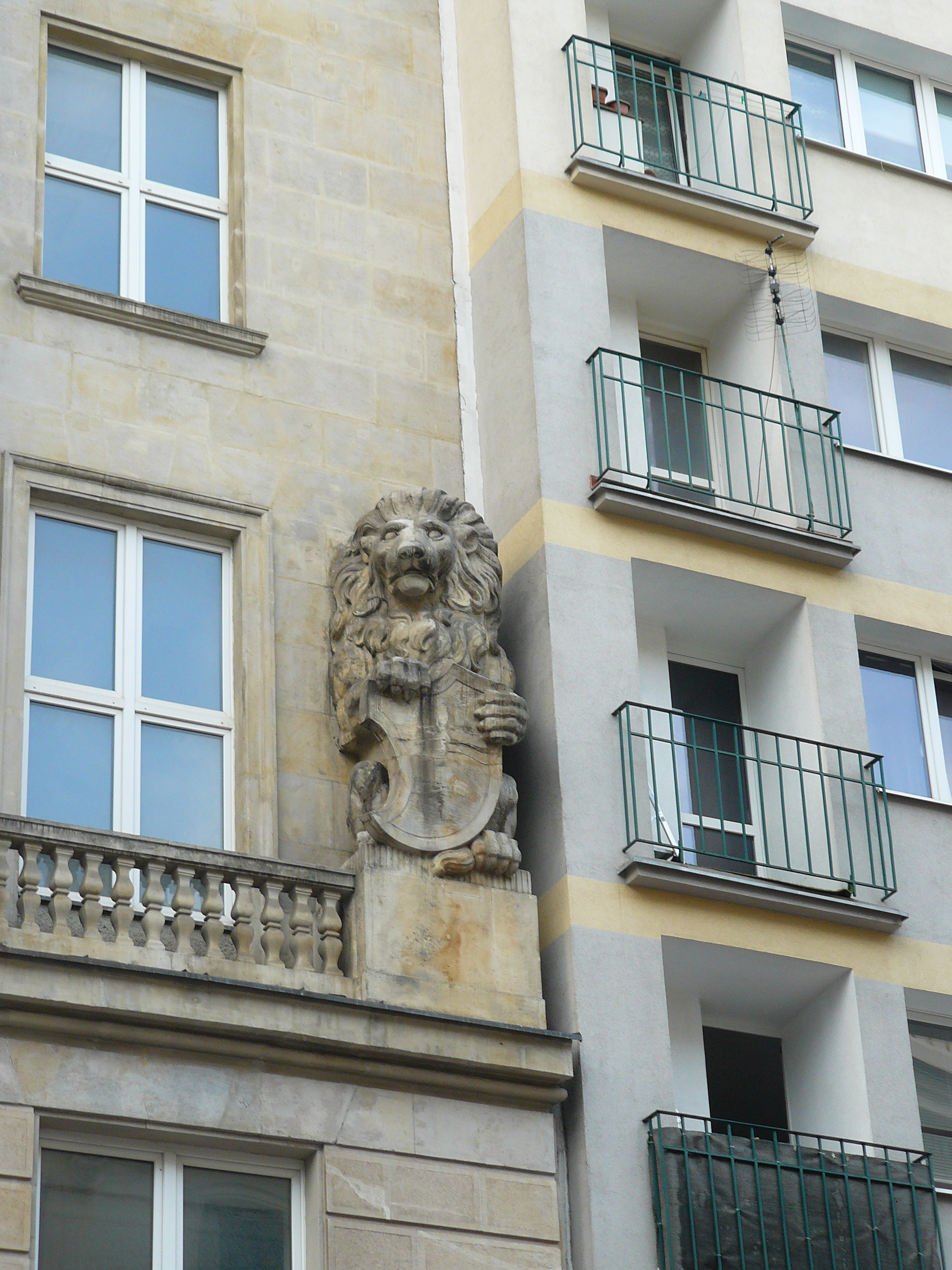
Dom pod Lwami, 8, Moniuszko Street, Warsaw

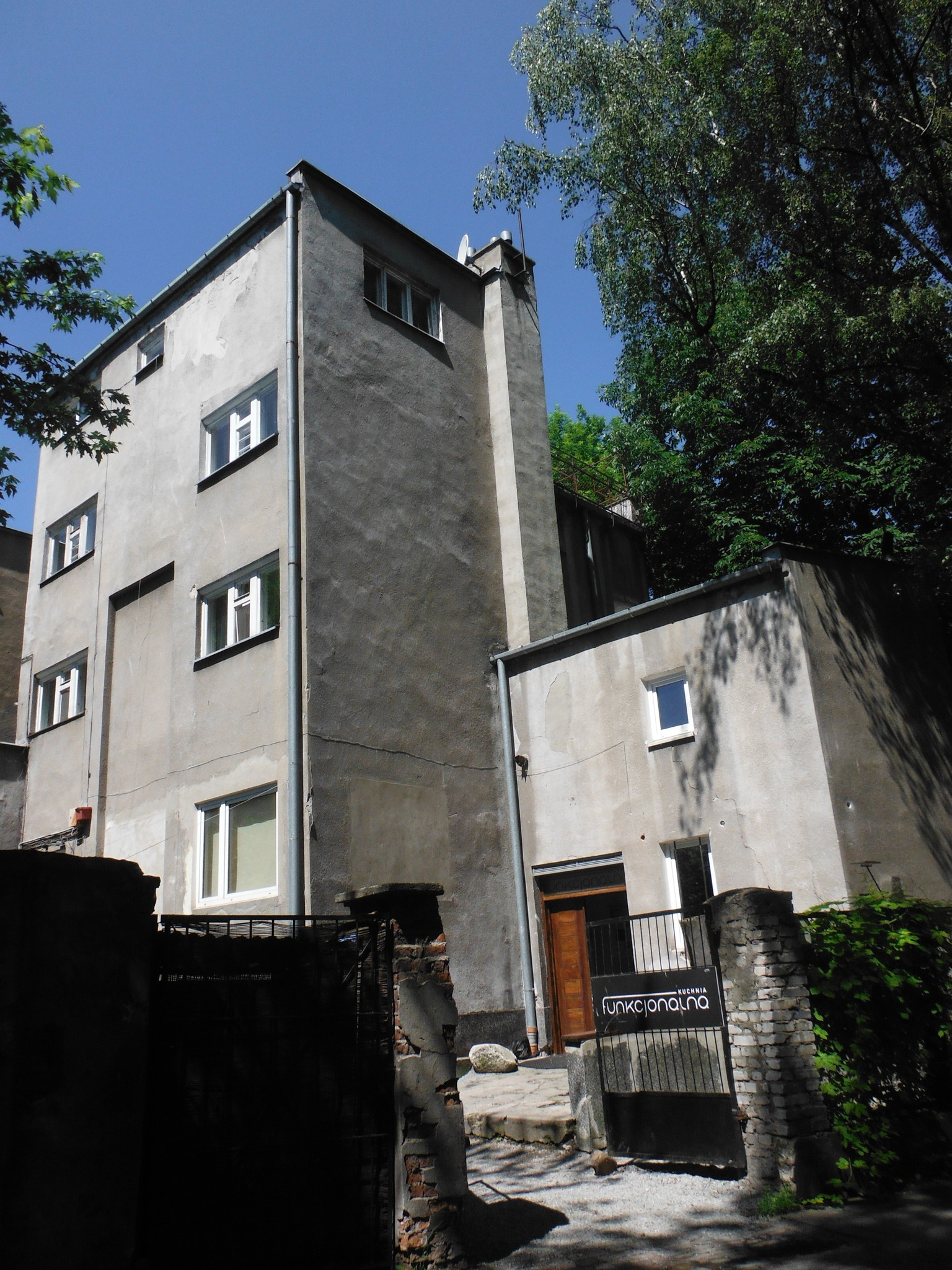
The Functional House (1928), where Lubelski lived and worked in Warsaw

He was very active in the inter-war years, successfully entering competitions and winning important public commissions. He exhibited frequently, including at Warsaw's Zachęta Gallery in 1920.

Between 1921 and 1927 he was a member of the Świt art circle centred on the art school in the city of Poznań. Original members of the group included artists such as Fryderyk Pautsch, Adam Ballenstedt, Bronisław Bartel, Wiktor Gosieniecki, Stanisław Jagmin, Lubelski, Władysław Roguski, Stefan Sonnewend and Jan Jerzy Wroniecki. The movement, made up of incomers to Poznań, was an attempt to stimulate Poznań's newly burgeoning Polish artistic life and art market. In January 1926 Lubelski won the competition to design a public monument of historical Polish and US hero, Tadeusz Kościuszko for the city of Łódź. He moved to that city for much of the duration of the project which took four years and was finally unveiled in December 1930. His well-loved Kosciuszko Monument in Liberty Square, central Łódź (1930), which the Germans destroyed in 1939, was able to be re-created by the artist in 1960.

At the 1927 Polish Sculpture (Rzeźba Polska) exhibition, he presented two works Hygieia handing down her knowledge in reconstituted stone, and a bust of Major General Thaddeus Unrug. On that occasion he was a member of the competition jury.

=== The Functional House ===
After 1929 he returned to Warsaw where he became the owner of the notable Modernist Functional House, at 16, Jakubowska Street in the Saska Kępa district of the capital. It contained his apartment and his studio, designed by his architect friend, Czesław Przybylski, professor at Warsaw Polytechnic. The heritage building was refurbished from public funds in 2011.

=== WWII occupation of Poland ===
When WWII broke out in 1939, he was in great peril as a Jew, and was assisted by the Bishop of Kielce, Czesław Kaczmarek who gave him sanctuary in his diocese, and with whom he corresponded to the end of the latter's life. While in Kielce he was taken on by a marble supplying firm, Kieleckie Marmury, which enabled him to work on several projects. Among them, is a bronze epitaph for the bishop now in Kielce Cathedral. He is commemorated by them with two other sculptors. During the German occupation of Poland he joined the Armia Krajowa – Home Army resistance - and took part in the Warsaw Uprising, following which he was incarcerated in a Nazi POW camp. After the war he settled and resumed his work in England, concentrating on ceramics in interior design with two notable exceptions.

=== Public commissions ===
His works in Warsaw included:

- Stone knights' armorials and lions decorating the Ministry of Army Affairs (Defence) near Nowowiejska St., two lions guarding entrance, after WWII placed in front of the Lubomirski Palace.
- Marble bas-reliefs in the vestibule of the National Theatre
- Ministry of Justice
- PKO Bank near Sienkiewicza St. (all 1924)
- Bas-relief over the portal of the State Institute of Hygiene
- Head of Themis on the tympanum the Raczyński Palace and other decorations (both 1925)
- Military Sappers' Monument (1932) A model of the work he made in bronze survives in the Museum of Warsaw.

In Poznań

- Equestrian statue in honour of the Poznań Lancers
- Architectural decorations to the entrance of the Apollo Passage

In Łódź

- General Tadeusz Kościuszko monument in Freedom Square
- Monument of King Władysław II Jagiełło

A majority of his monumental works were destroyed during the Second World War.

Lubelski created many sculptures for public buildings and churches, perhaps his best known being the Grade II* Listed Polish War Memorial at Northolt Aerodrome, west London, unveiled in 1948.

=== Sacred Art ===
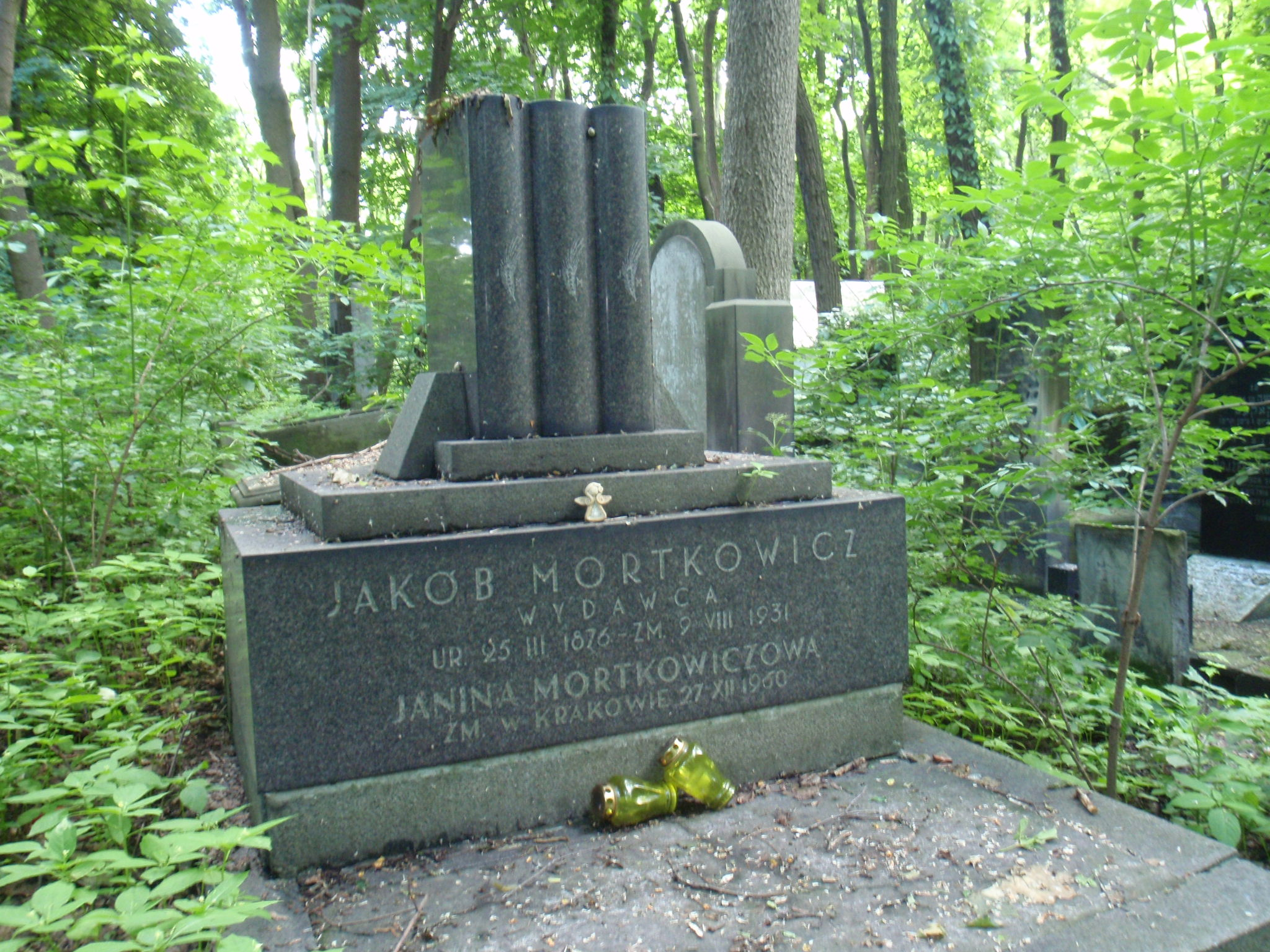
Grave of Jakub and Janina Mortkowicz, Warsaw

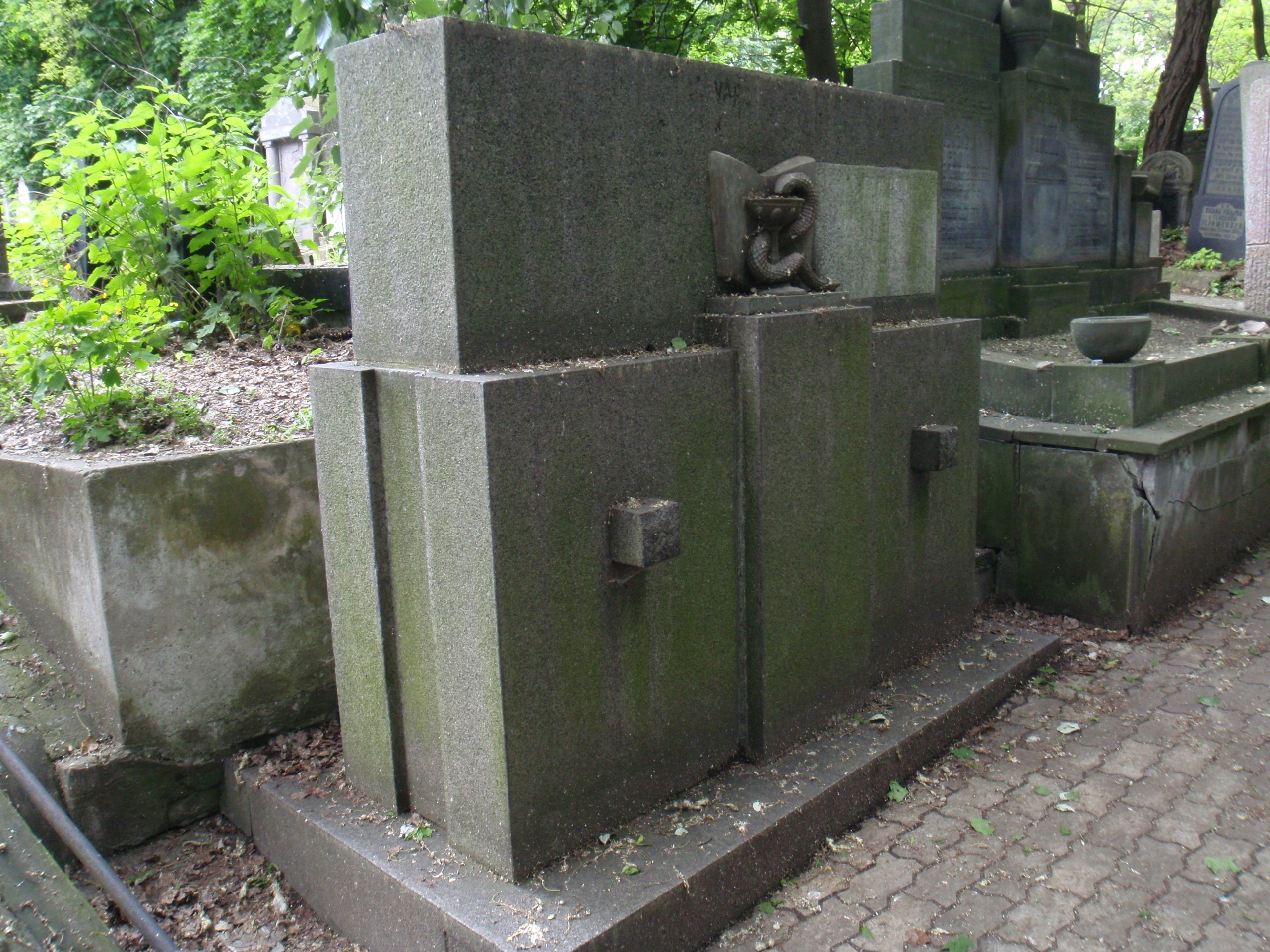
Grave of Edward Flatau, Warsaw

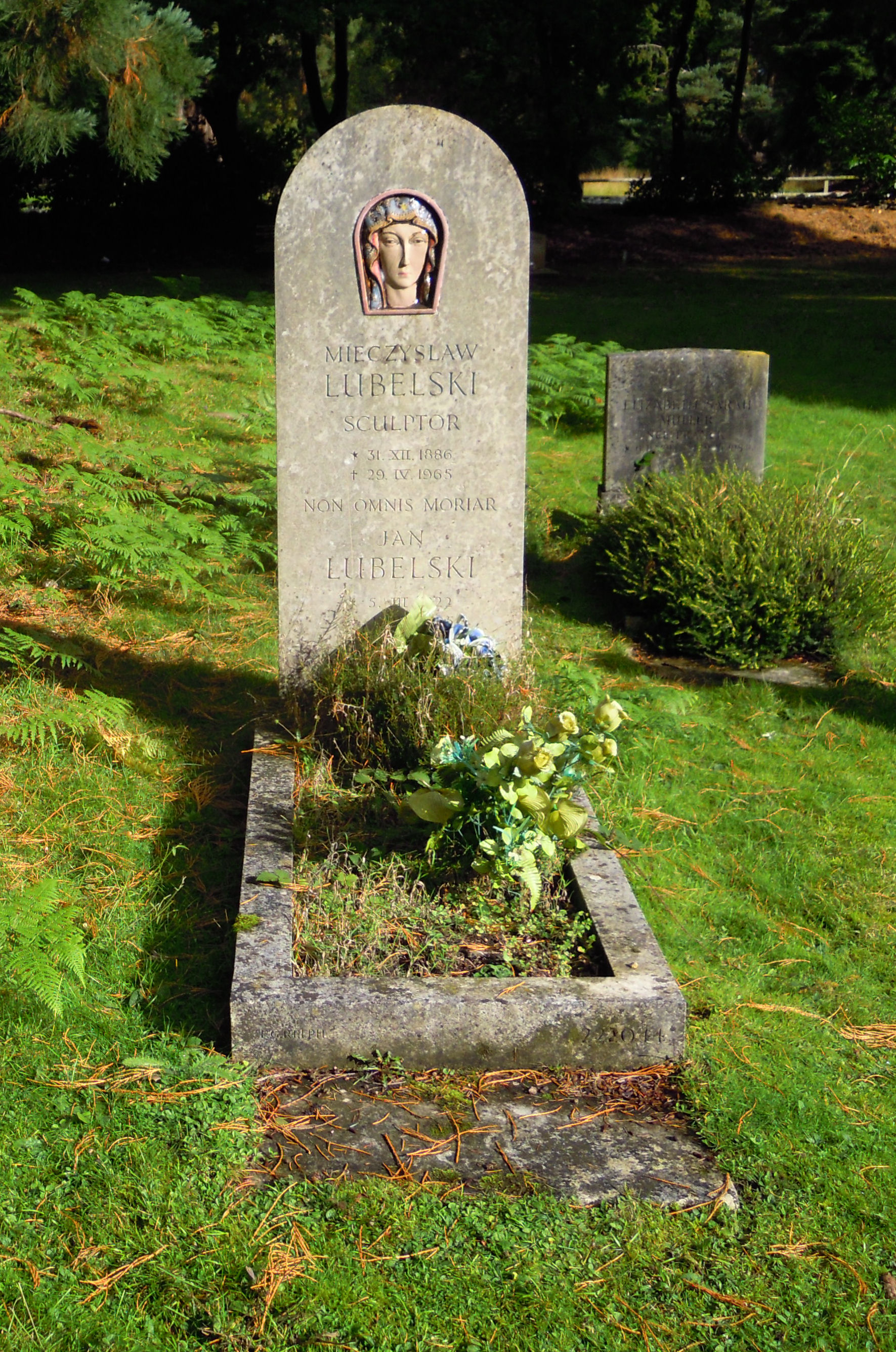
Grave of Mieczysław Lubelski in Brookwood Cemetery, Surrey

- Interior decoration of the chapel in Górczyn in Poznaň
- Statuary in Puszczykowo church Greater Poznaň
- Statue of Our Lady of the Rosary in front of the St Mary's Church in Pabianice (1928)
- Model for statue of Our Lady of Lourdes in Holy Cross church in Łódź, (realization by Wacław Konopka).

=== Funerary art ===
Lubelski is believed to be the author of the tomb of Captain Czesław Pobóg-Pruśnikowski (1893-1924) Virtuti Militari, commissioned by his regiment for the Fort Winiary cemetery in Poznań in 1924. Among several monuments Lubelski designed in the Jewish Cemetery, Warsaw is the grave of L. L. Zamenhof, the creator of Esperanto, where it still stands. The monument was actually assembled from local granite in Aberdeen and transported from Scotland to Warsaw in 1921. Other of his monuments in the Okopowa Street Jewish Cemetery are those of Edward Flatau and Jakub Mortkowicz.

At the historic Lutheran Cemetery in Warsaw, Lubelski is the author of two extant projects: the bronze relief portrait of Eugenia Prochnau and the funerary statue of Franciszek Sokal (1881-1932), Polish delegate to the League of Nations.

One of his only funerary monuments in London consists of a maiolica plaque of Christ praying in Gethsemane, set in a concrete chapel-shaped headstone on the grave of Dr. Antoni Kutek at Brompton Cemetery.

A bronze memorial medal to Lubelski's design was struck in 1920 in memory of the fallen troops in the Polish-Bolshevic War.

== Literature ==
Lubelski is the subject of a sketch by the eminent literary editor, Stefania Kossowska. He also appears as a minor character in the novel A Curable Romantic (2010) by Joseph Skibell, which won the 2011 Sami Rohr Prize in Jewish Literature and was nominated for the 2012 Townsend Prize for Fiction.

== Personal life ==
During his post-graduate studies in Berlin, he met his future German wife, Hildegarde Frank. They had two children. The marriage did not last and Hilde returned to her native city of Bonn in the late 1920s. Their daughter, Urszula, became the mother of a British-born actor and dancer, Christine Paul-Podlasky. His son was Jan Stanisław Lubelski.

Lubelski died in London and is buried in Brookwood Cemetery, Brookwood, Surrey, England.

== Gallery ==
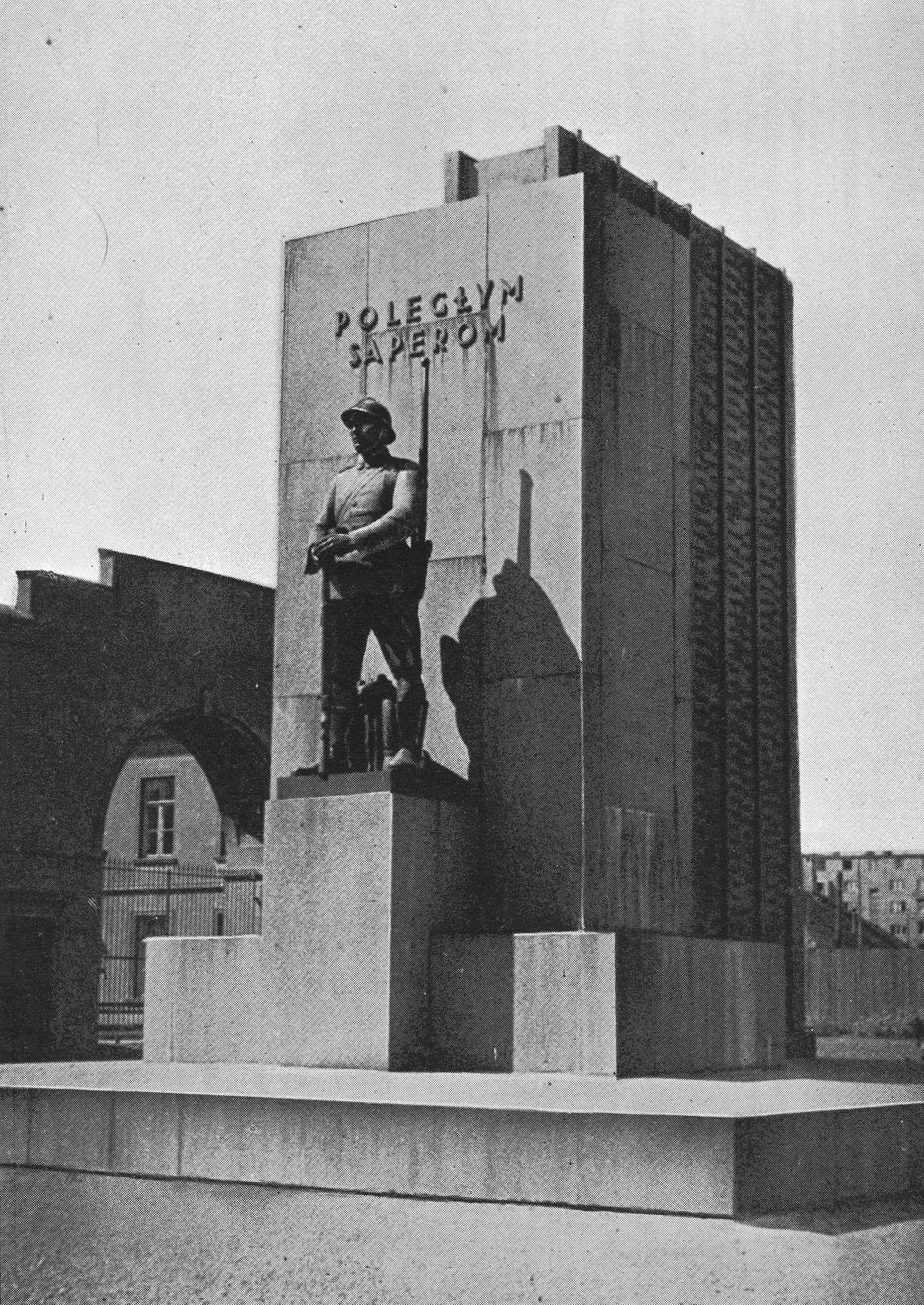
Sappers' Memorial, Warsaw

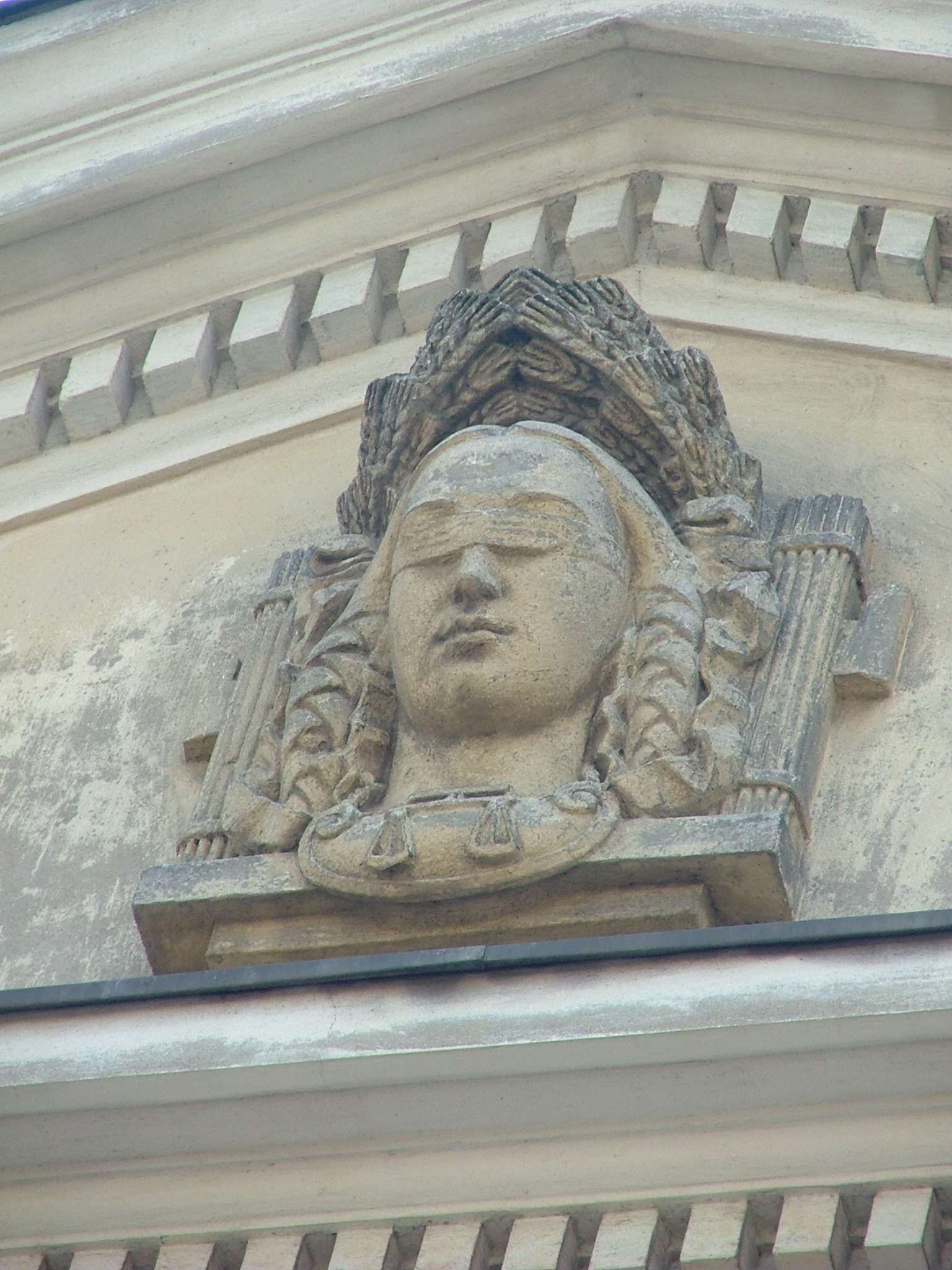
Head of Themis on the tympanum of the Raczyński Palace, Warsaw

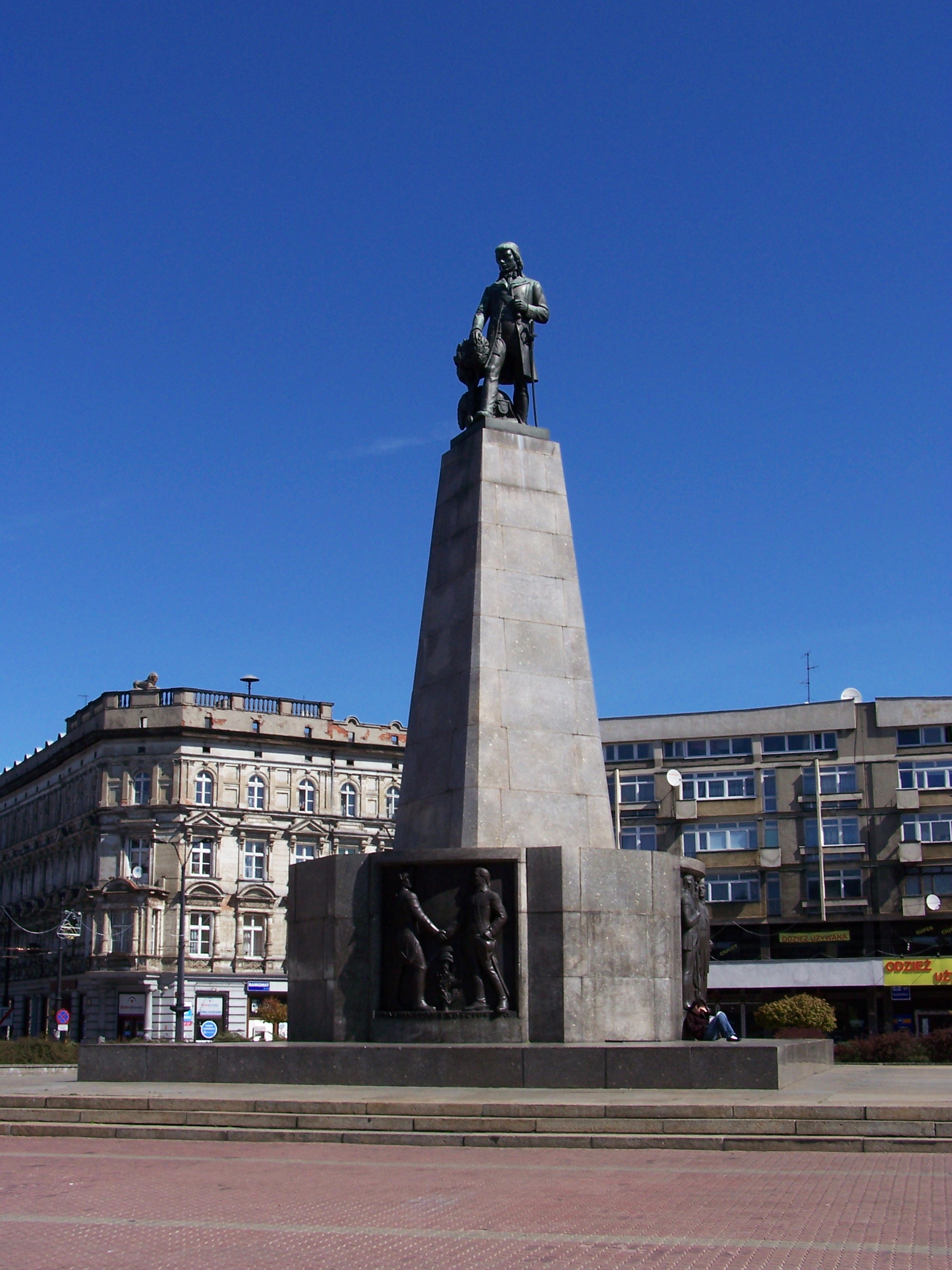
Kosciuszko Monument in Liberty Square, Łódź

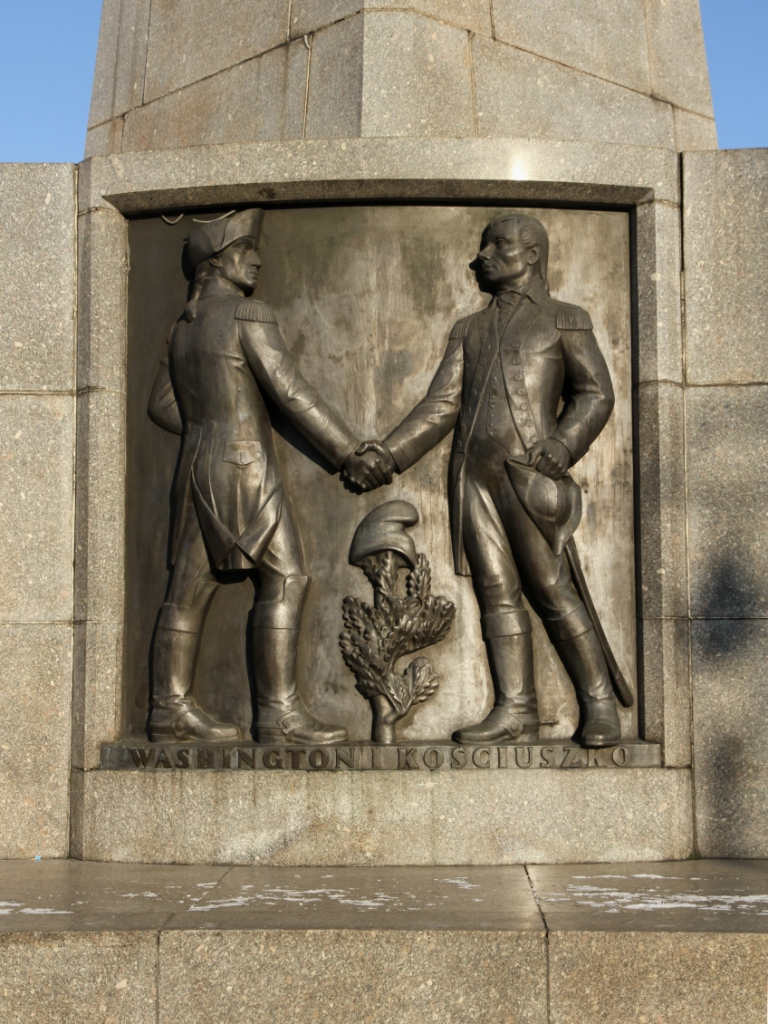
Detail, Kościuszko monument, Washington relief, Łódź

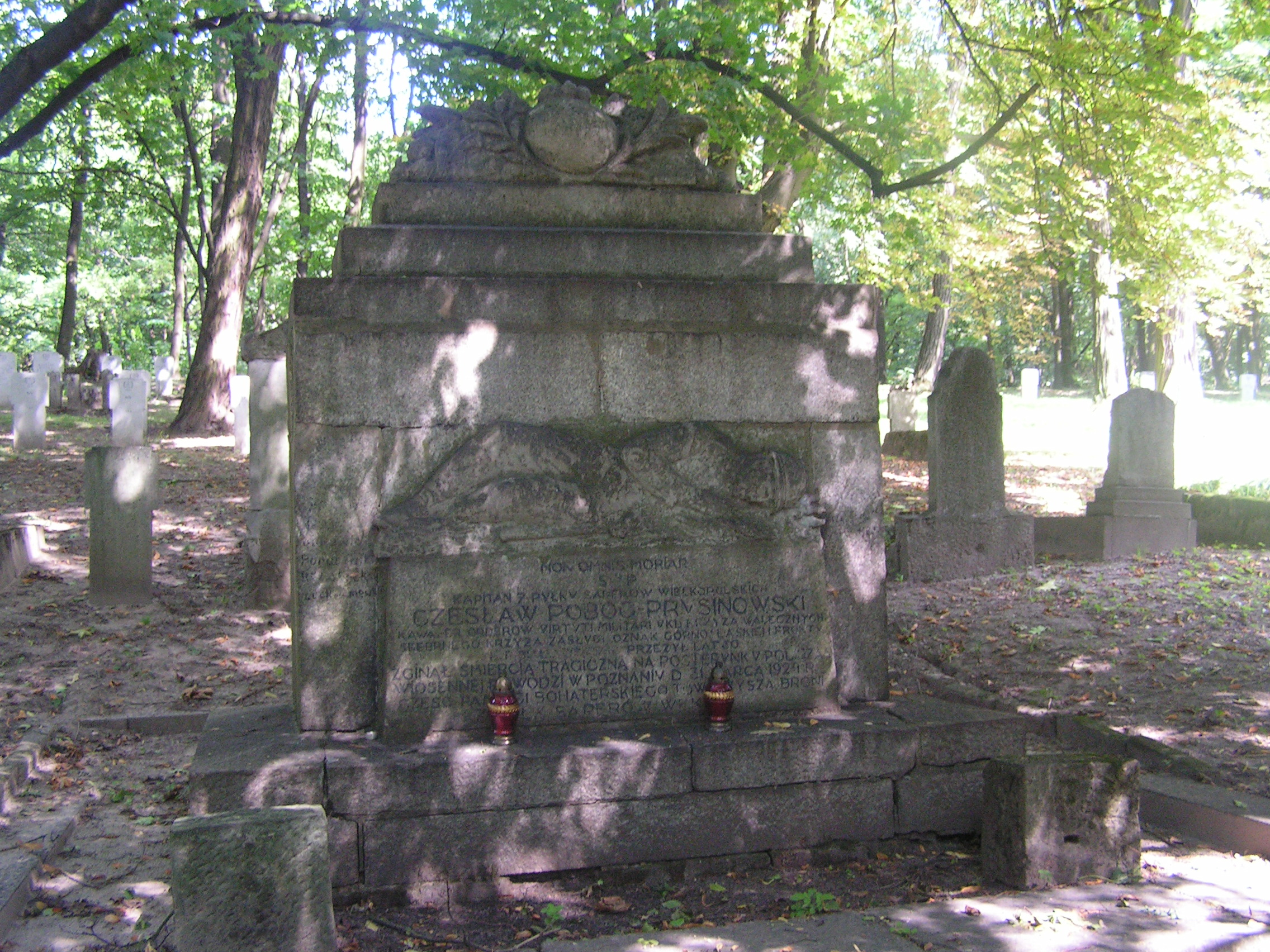
Tomb of Capt. C. Pobóg-Pruśnikowski, Fort Winiary Cemetery, Poznań

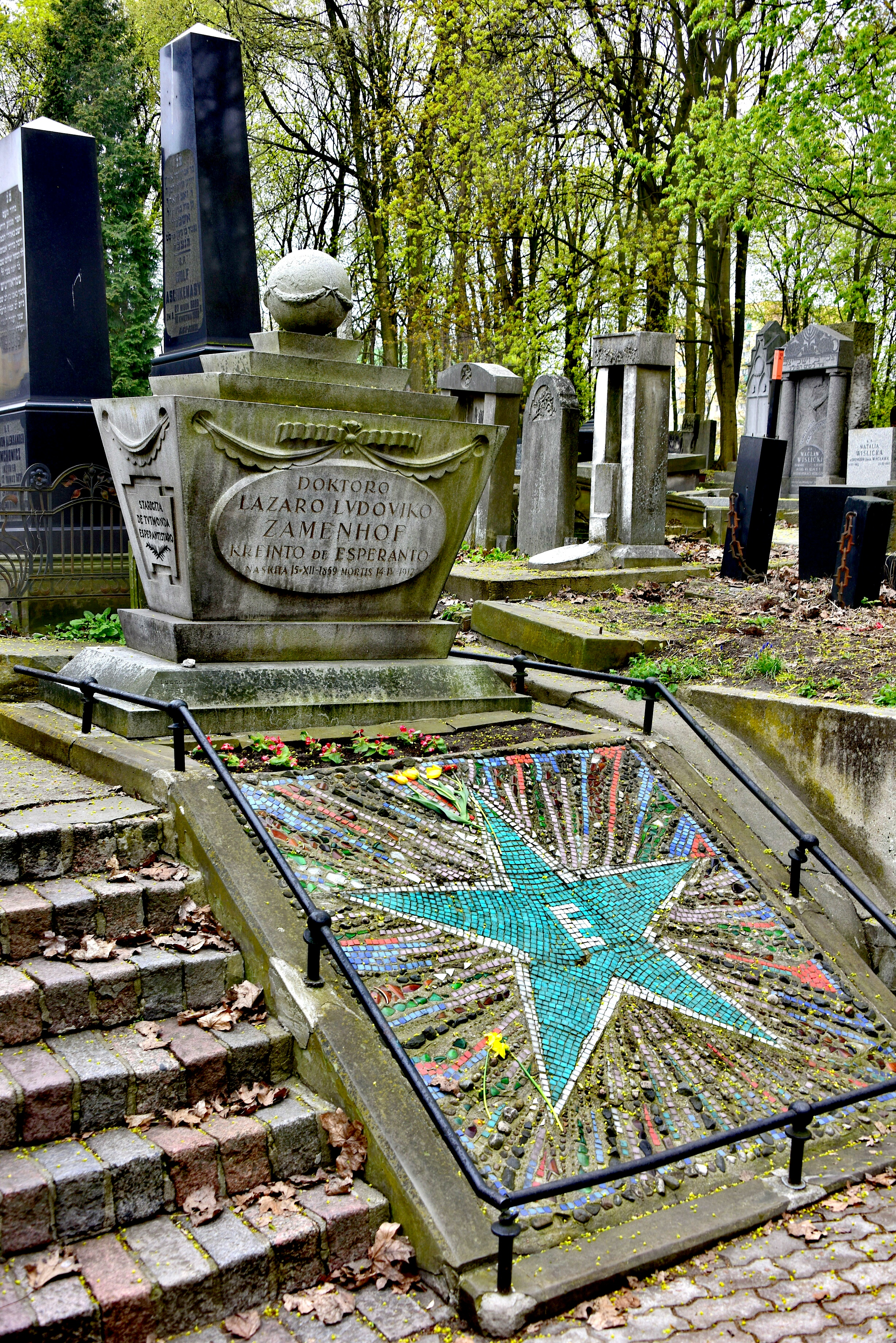
Grave of L. L. Zamenhof in the Jewish Cemetery, Warsaw

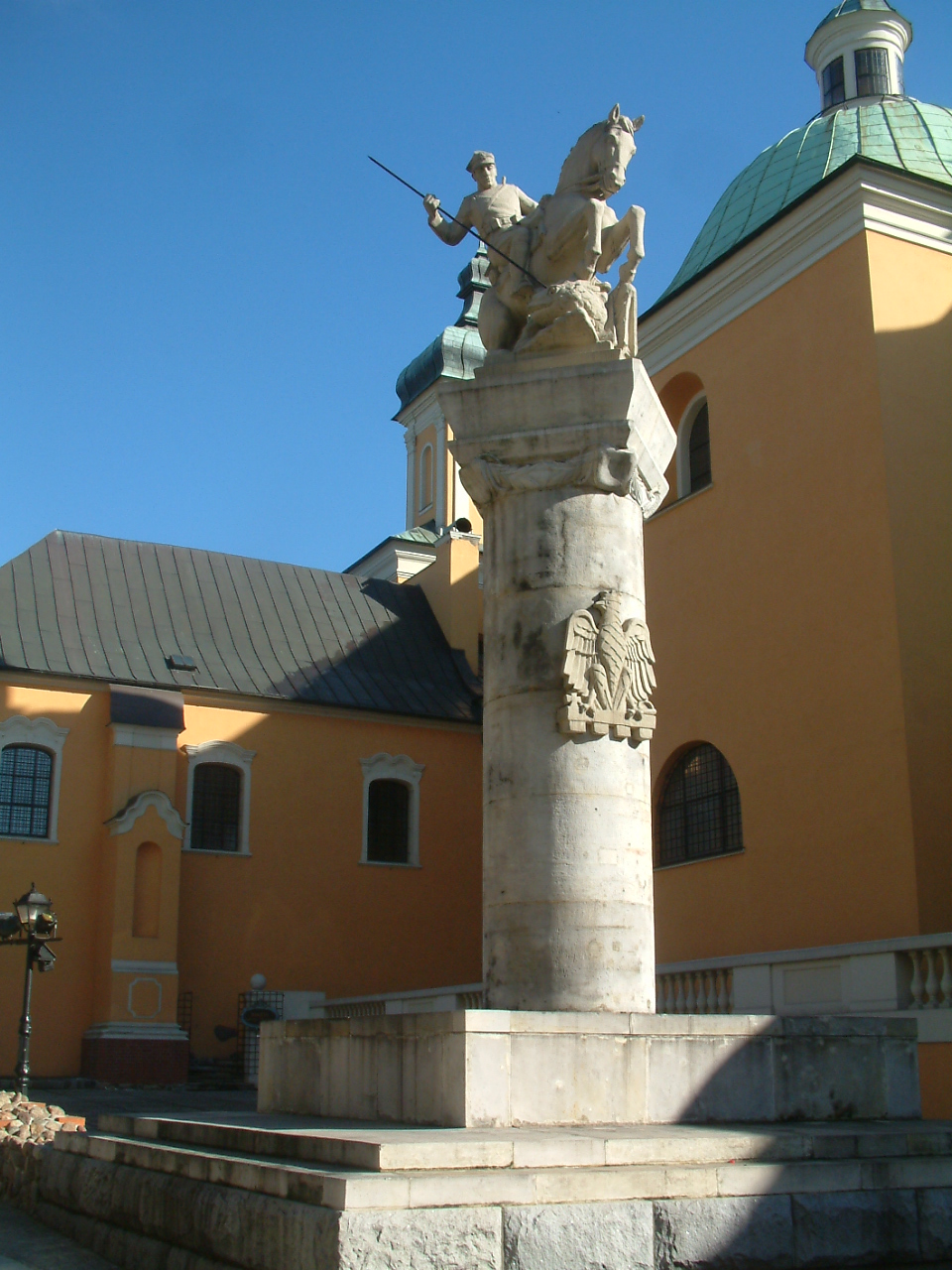
Monument of Poznań Uhlans

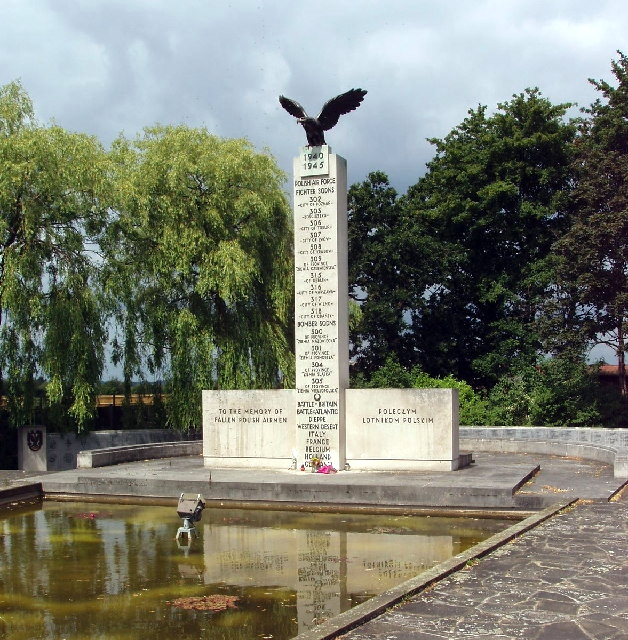
Polish War Memorial, Northolt

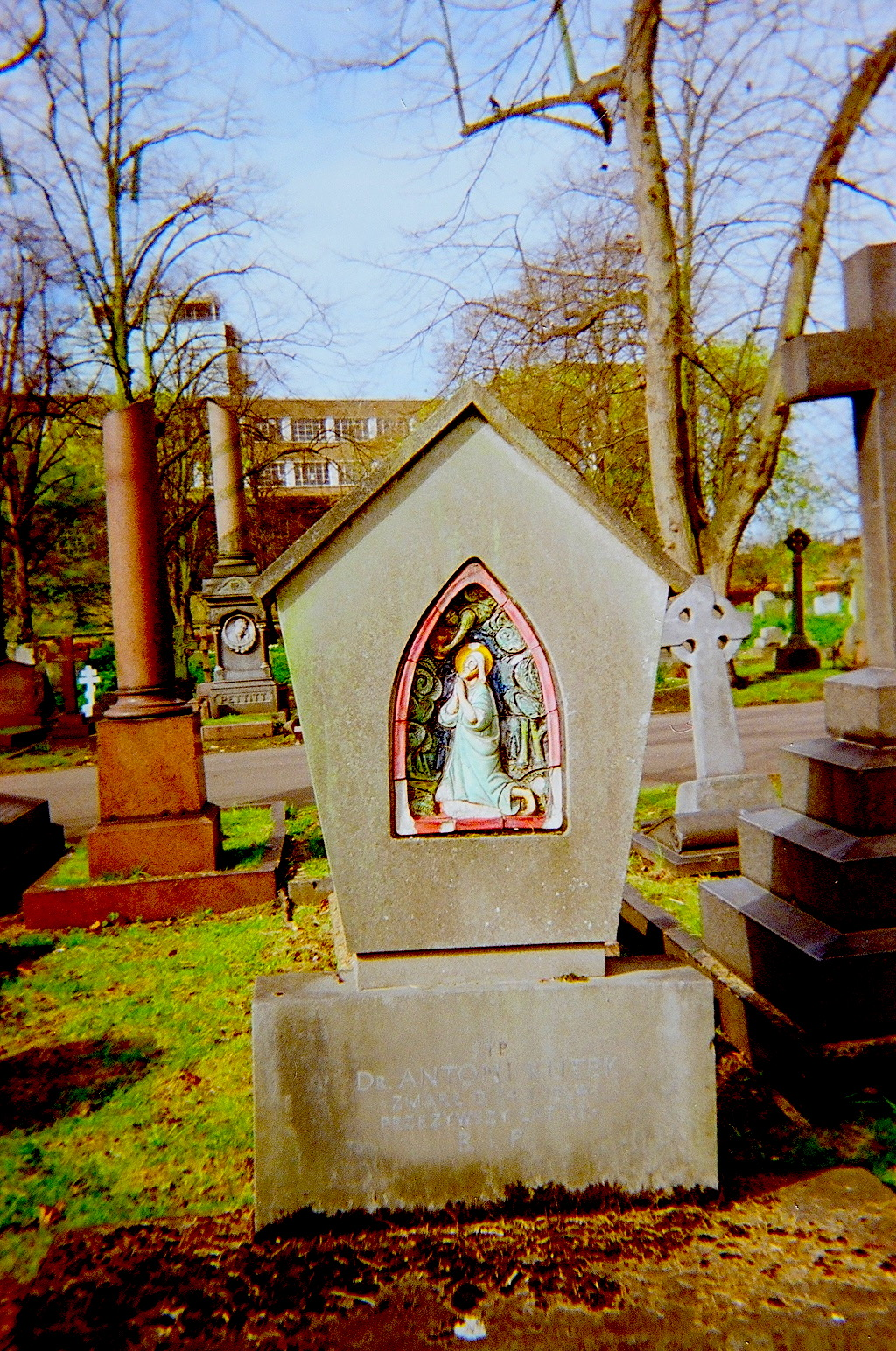
Grave of Dr. Antoni Kutek, Brompton Cemetery, London
