= Fryderyk Pautsch =

Polish painter (1877–1950)

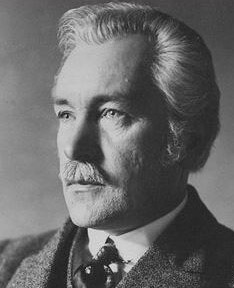
Fryderyk Pautsch (date unknown)

Fryderyk Pautsch (22 September 1877, Deliatyn - 1 July 1950, Kraków) was a Polish painter; associated with the Young Poland movement.

== Life and work ==
In 1898, he began his studies in jurisprudence at the Franciscan College of the University of Lwów (now the University of Lviv), followed by advanced legal studies at the Jagiellonian University in Kraków. He decided to change direction and pursue a career in art instead. He enrolled at the Academy of Fine Arts where his instructors included Leon Wyczółkowski and Józef Unierzyski.

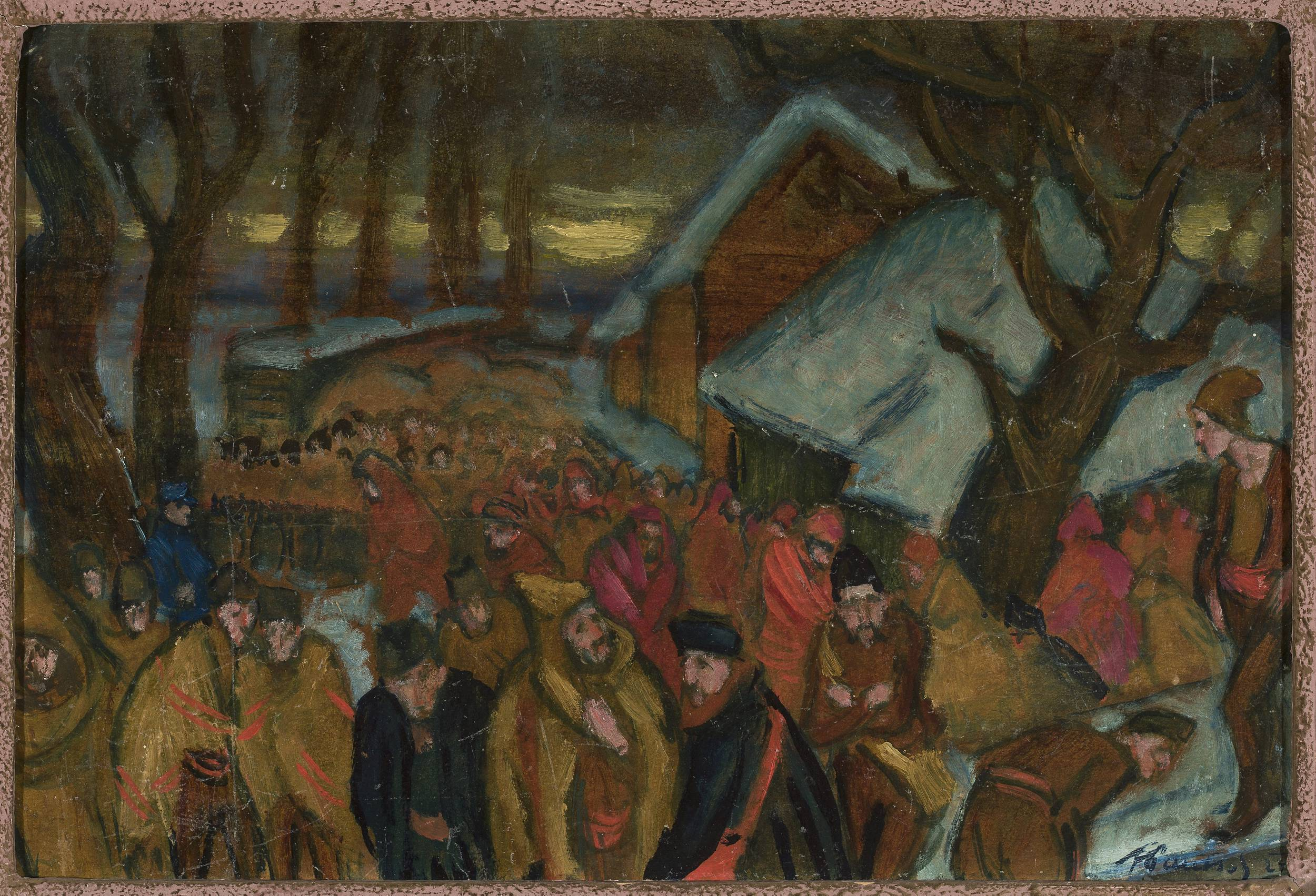
War Transports from Serbia

Thanks to a scholarship, he was able to study in Paris, at the Académie Julian, from 1905 to 1906. When he returned, he settled in Lwów, but paid frequent visits to Pokuttia (southeast Galicia), where he painted scenes featuring the Hutsul people and their culture. In 1908, he became a member of the Society of Polish Artists ("Sztuka"). Four years later, he joined the Vienna Hagenbund. That same year, he was appointed Professor of Decorative Painting at the State Art Academy in Breslau, now Wrocław. He exhibited frequently, under the name "Friedrich Pautsch", notably at the Große Berliner Kunstausstellung of 1914, where he presented seventeen works.

During World War I, he served in the Polish Legion, an independent unit within the Austro-Hungarian Army. From 1915, he also worked as a war artist, assigned to the Royal War Press Detail. He would hold that position until shortly after the war ended. In 1919, he left Breslau now to accept the post of Director of the school of Arts and Crafts in Poznań. There, he was one of the founders of an artists' movement known as "Świt" (Dawn), which included the monumental sculptor, Mieczysław Lubelski.

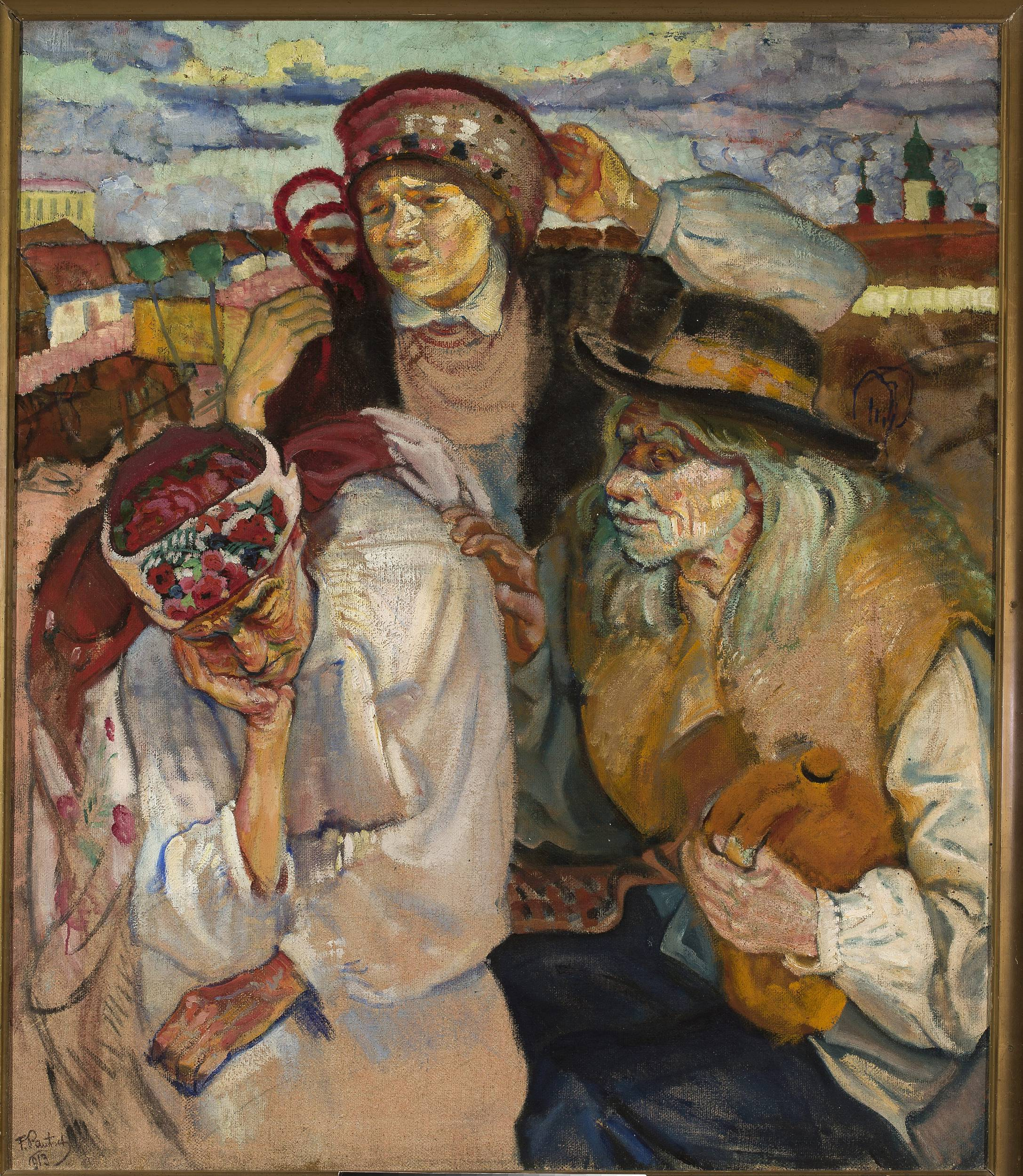
A Study of Hutsul Peasants

In 1925, he was appointed a Professor at Krakow Academy of Fine Arts. In addition, he served as Rector there in 1931 and 1936. In the latter year, he was awarded the Officer's Cross of the Order of Polonia Restituta in 1931 and the Commander's Cross in 1936 for services to the arts. During the German occupation of Poland, he was demoted to lecturer at the renamed, Staatliche Kunstgewerbeschule (State Art School) until it closed in 1943 when the German staff were called up for army service. After the war, in 1945 Pautsch returned to his position as professor at the academy, which he held until his death.
