= Ben Dearnley =

English sculptor

- Born: 1964 (age 61–62); Salisbury, Wiltshire, England
- Education: Les Sandham
- Known for: Sculpture
- Website: www.bendearnley.com

Ben Dearnley (born 1964) is an English sculptor. He was born in Salisbury, Wiltshire, England.

== Training ==
In 1997 Dearnley began his training in carving stone with sculptor Les Sandham.

== The 'Avenue of Champions' series ==
Dearnley was selected as an Official Olympic Artist for London's 2012 Olympics, and is best known for his 'Avenue of Champions' series, a collaboration with some of Britain's finest Olympic and Paralympics athletes to commemorate the 2012 Games. Athletes depicted in the series include: Mark Foster, Ade Adepitan, Debbie Flood, Alex O'Connell, Christine Ohuruogu, Lee Pearson, Louis Smith, Leon Taylor and Steve Williams.

== Other work ==
Dearnley's other works include: a bronze portrait of violist Lionel Tertis, on permanent display at the Royal Academy of Music; a marble torso placed within London's Law Courts; and a bird sculpture on permanent show in Lake Farm Country Park in Hayes, west London.
