= Bronisław Bartel =

Polish painter (1887–1968)

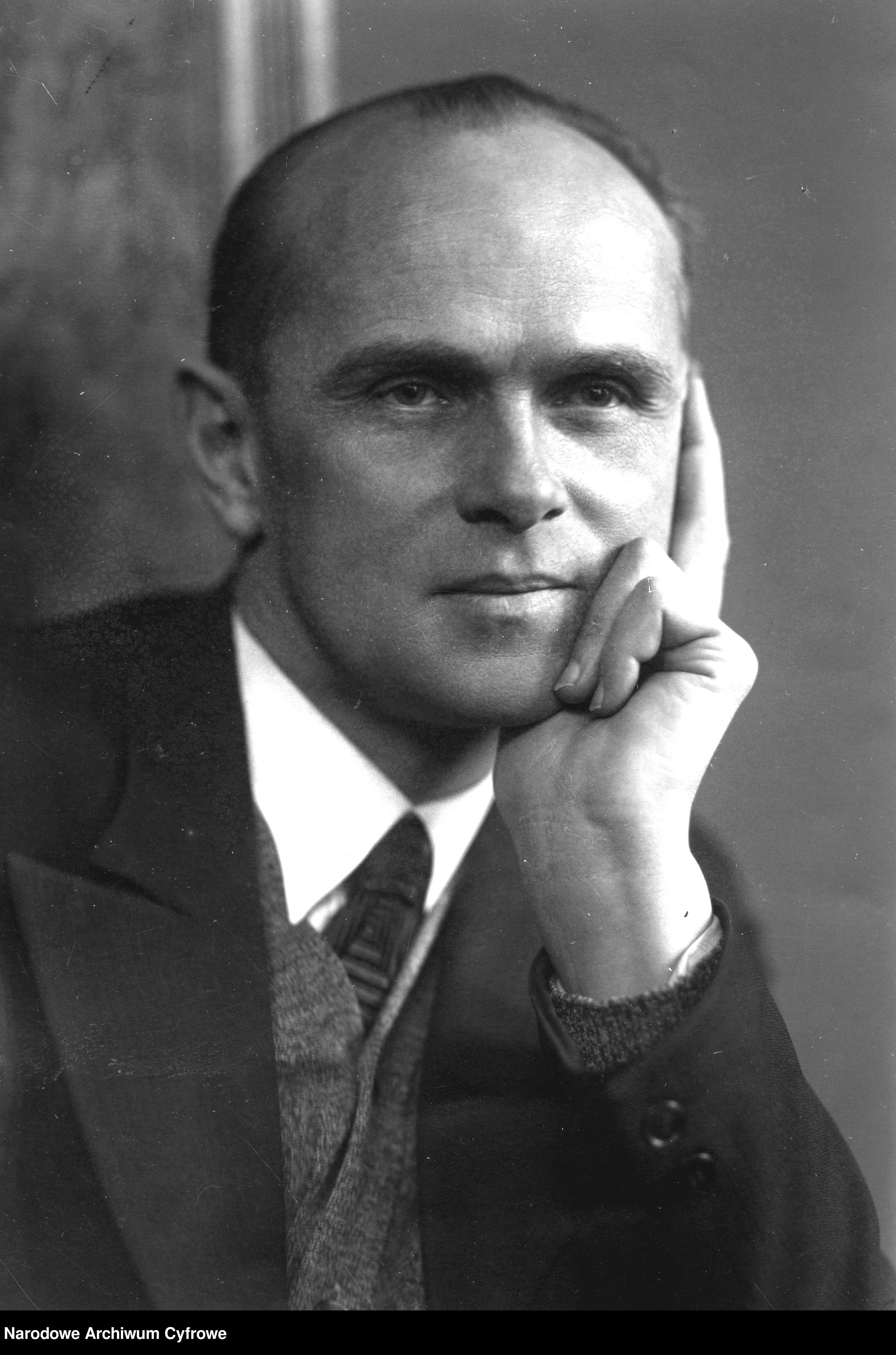
- Bronisław Bartel in 1934
- Born: 3 November 1887; Zawiercie, Congress Poland
- Died: 24 April 1968 (aged 80); Poznań, Poland
- Resting place: Junikowo Cemetery, Poznań; 52°23′11″N 16°49′58″E
- Occupation: Painter
- Awards

Bronisław Bartel (1887 – 1968) was a Polish painter. He was a professor at the State School of Artistic Industry in Bydgoszcz (1922-1926), professor of decorative painting, anatomy and nude study at the University of Fine Arts in Poznań (1927-1939) and the director of the High School of Fine Arts in Poznań (1946-1951).

== Biography ==
Bronisław Bartel was born in Zawiercie on 3 November 1887., from Herman Bartel, an industry clerk, and Salomea née Borg. Adter his birth, the family moved to the village of Sławniów, 20 kilometres (12 mi) east of Zawiercie. There Bronisław's brothers were born:Ryszard (22 March 1897) and Zygfryd (31 January 1899).

From 1905 to 1910, he attended the Academy of Fine Arts in Krakow under the supervision of famous professors: Julian Fałat, Teodor Axentowicz and Ferdynand Ruszczyc. His first solo exhibition took place in 1910 at the Kraków Society of Friends of Fine Arts.

In 1912, he spent one year in Warsaw before residing permanently in Poznań. There, in 1919, he started working as the manager of the St. Wojciech Printing and Bookstore (Święty Wojciech Dom Medialny), a publishing house founded in 1897 by Archbishop Florian Stablewski. It is today the oldest Catholic publishing house operating in Poland.

From 1921 to 1926, he was a member of the Świt Association for people with disabilities and the president of the Greater Poland Artists' Group Plastyka. Between 1922 and 1926, Bartel was a professor at the State School of Artistic Industry in Bydgoszcz:

he lived in 20 January 1920 Street at today's Nr. 19.

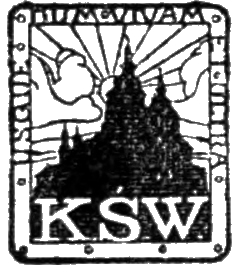
logo of the "Księgarnia Święty Wojciech" in the 1920s

Between 1927 and 1939 he served as a professor of decorative painting, anatomy and nude study at the University of Fine Arts in Poznań. From 1946 to 1951, he was the director of the High School of Fine Arts in Poznań.

In 1929, he won the third prize in the competition for the polychrome decoration of the Sejm Hall in Warsaw. The Poznań's Association of Polish Artists and Designers organized an exhibition of Bartel's works in February 1959.

Bronisław Bartel died on 24 April 1968, in Poznań. He was buried on 27 April 1968, at the Junikowo Cemetery in Poznań.

== Works ==
Bartel painted figurative compositions, portraits, landscapes, still lifes in warm, subdued colors. He also practiced decorative paintings or poster designs. The collection of the National Museum in Poznań includes some of his works.

=== Selective list of creations ===
- Podwórko (Backyard) - 1912, Regional Museum of Bydgoszcz;
- Zima (Winter) - 1913;
- Roztopy (Thaws) - 1913;
- Wieś o zimowym zmierzchu (The village at winter dusk) - 1915;
- Portret Matki (Mother's portrait) - 1917, National Museum in Poznań;
- Dziecko (Child) - 1932;
- Demon - 1930, National Museum in Poznań;
- Mulatka (Mulatto) - 1930, National Museum in Poznań;
- Walcownia (Rolling mill) - 1949, National Museum in Poznań.

== Personal life ==
Bronisław Bartel married two times, first to Adela Maria Kiersztejnin, then to Janina Brzezińska. He had three children.

== Rewards and recognition ==
On 11 November 1936, by decision of the President of the Republic of Poland, Bronisław Bartel was awarded was awarded the Golden Cross of Merit (Polish: Złoty Krzyż Zasługi) for his works in the field of culture and art.

== See also ==
- Bydgoszcz
- List of Polish people
- National Museum in Poznań
- Regional Museum, Bydgoszcz
- Święty Wojciech Dom Medialny

== Bibliography ==
- Rudowski, Jan (1992). Polski słownik biograficzny T. 33 [Polish Biographical Dictionary Vol. 33 (1991-1992)] (in Polish). Wrocław: Zakład Narodowy im. Ossolińskich - Wydawnictwo Polskiej Akademii Nauk. pp. 501–515.
