= Hatton Cross tube station =

London Underground station

Hatton Cross
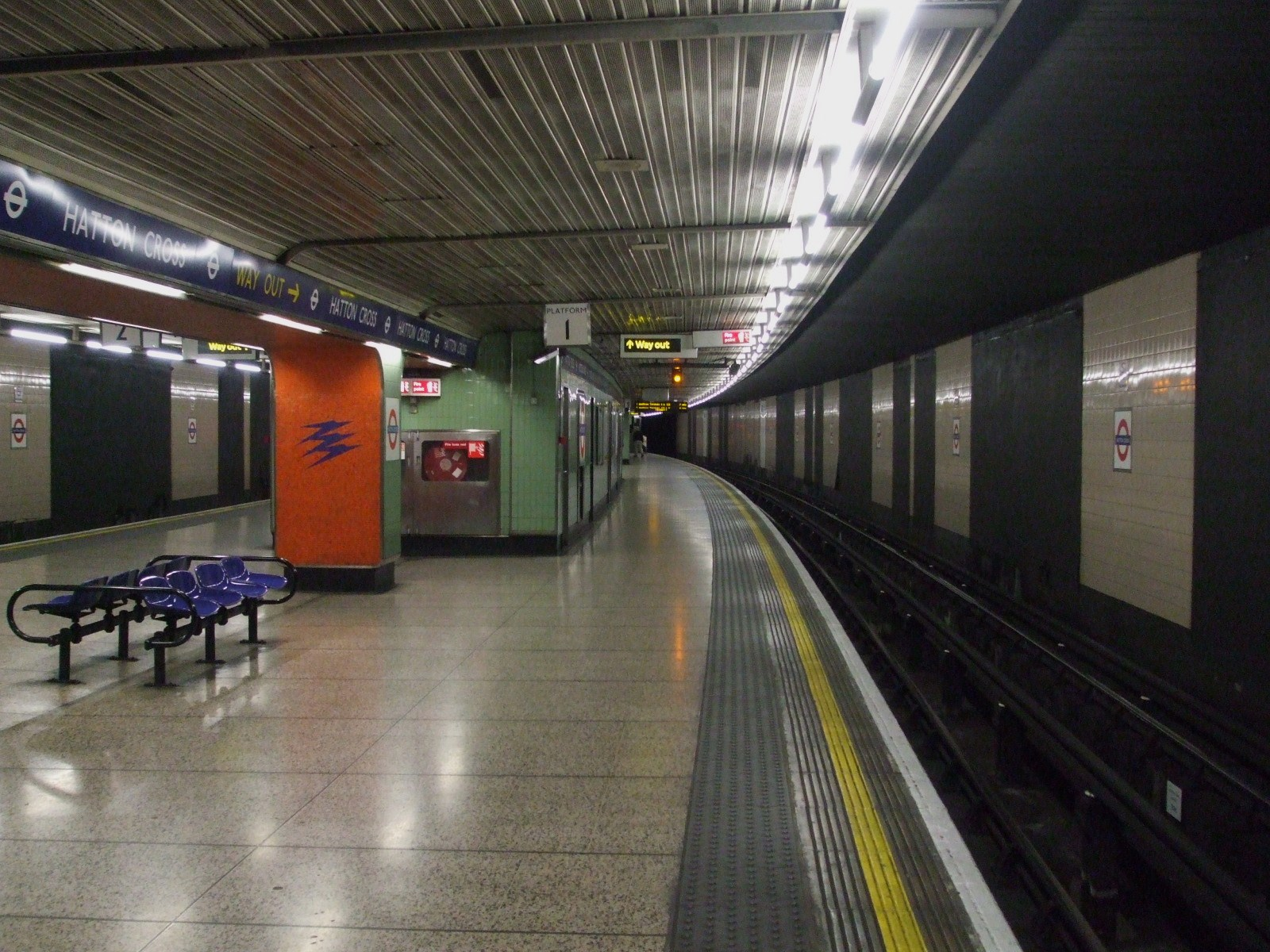
- Piccadilly line westbound platform at the station
- Interactive map of Hatton Cross

General information
- Location: Hatton
- Local authority: London Borough of Hillingdon
- Managed by: London Underground
- Number of platforms: 2
- Fare zone: 5 and 6

London Underground annual entry and exit
- 2021: ▼1.41 million
- 2022: ▲2.63 million
- 2023: ▲2.85 million
- 2024: ▲3.13 million
- 2025: ▼2.91 million

Railway companies
- Original company: London Transport Executive (GLC)

Key dates
- 19 July 1975: Station opened as terminus
- 16 December 1977: Line extended to Heathrow Central
- 7 April 1986: Heathrow Terminal 4 loop opened

Other information
- External links: TfL station info page
- Coordinates: 51.46694°N 0.42333°W

Hatton Cross is a London Underground station. It is on the Heathrow branch of the Piccadilly line between Heathrow Terminals 2 & 3 or Heathrow Terminal 4 and Hounslow West stations. It is in both London fare zone 5 and 6 and stands between the Great South West Road (A30) and the Heathrow Airport Southern Perimeter Road. The station serves a large area including Feltham to the south and Bedfont to the west. It was named after the crossroads of the Great South West Road and Hatton Road.

The station, itself in the borough of Hillingdon, is situated within the small settlement of Hatton, which straddles the border between Hillingdon and the neighbouring borough of Hounslow. The nearby area is partly within the airport but mainly includes its associated commercial warehousing and light industrial premises. "Hatton Cross" refers to the crossroads on the former coaching road leading south-west, and is now applied to the overlying major road intersection immediately south-east of the station.

Hatton Cross is also the nearest Underground station to the popular plane spotting location of Myrtle Avenue, and for this reason is commonly used by plane spotters travelling to the area.

== History ==
The station opened on 19 July 1975 in the first phase of the extension of the Piccadilly line from Hounslow West to Heathrow Airport and it remained the terminus until Heathrow Central opened on 16 December 1977. The line from Hounslow West was built by W. & C. French.

On its opening in 1975, Hatton Cross was one of 279 active stations on the London Underground, the highest ever total; the number of stations in the network has since decreased to 272.

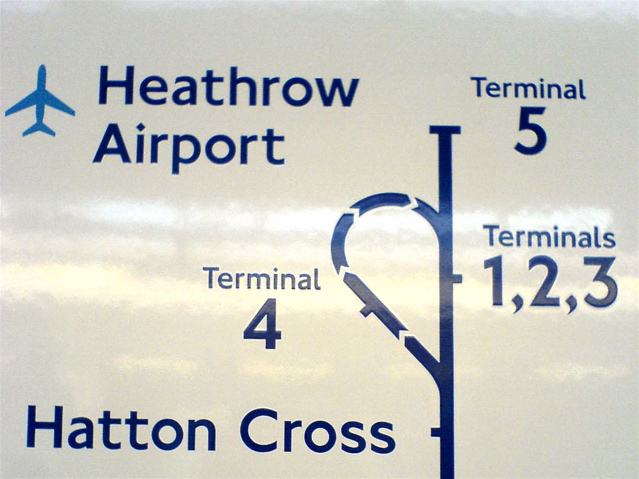
Part of a Piccadilly route map sign in 2006, showing the arrangement of stations at Heathrow.

For the new Terminal 4 at the airport, a single track loop was tunnelled from Hatton Cross to Heathrow Central (now called "Heathrow Terminals 2 & 3") with an intermediate new Terminal 4 station, which opened on 12 April 1986. The tube service to the airport then ran clockwise in a one-way loop from Hatton Cross to Terminal 4, on to Terminals 2 & 3, and back to Hatton Cross.

On 7 January 2005, the loop and Terminal 4 station closed and the tube service reverted to its previous two-way running between Hatton Cross and the Terminals 2 & 3 station while tunnels to the new Heathrow Terminal 5 station were under construction; a shuttle bus from Hatton Cross was provided for passengers travelling to and from Terminal 4. Service round the loop restarted on 17 September 2006.

== Operations and infrastructure ==
Since 27 March 2008, when Terminal 5 station opened, alternate trains, of the twelve per hour arriving at Hatton Cross from London, have taken the Terminal 4 loop. These trains call at Heathrow Terminal 4, and then Terminals 2 & 3, before returning to London. The other alternate trains run to Heathrow Terminal 5, via Terminals 2 & 3.

Just to the east of the station the Piccadilly line briefly resurfaces to cross the River Crane then descends back underground again, heading towards Hounslow West.

Immediately to the west of the station is the junction where the Terminal 4 loop diverges; this can be seen from the end of the westbound platform. This junction can be accessed only from the westbound track; thus there is no connection to the eastbound line where trains arrive from Terminals 2 & 3.

== Architecture ==
The platforms at Hatton Cross are in a cut and cover tunnel. The platform tiling on the central columns features patterns derived from the British Airways Speedbird logo, originally designed by Theyre Lee-Elliott in 1932.

The station building, a brutalist, concrete-and-glass, single-storey box, incorporates a busy bus station, which serves the airport and the surrounding area. The concrete frieze at roof level which encircles the building is the work of the artist William Mitchell.

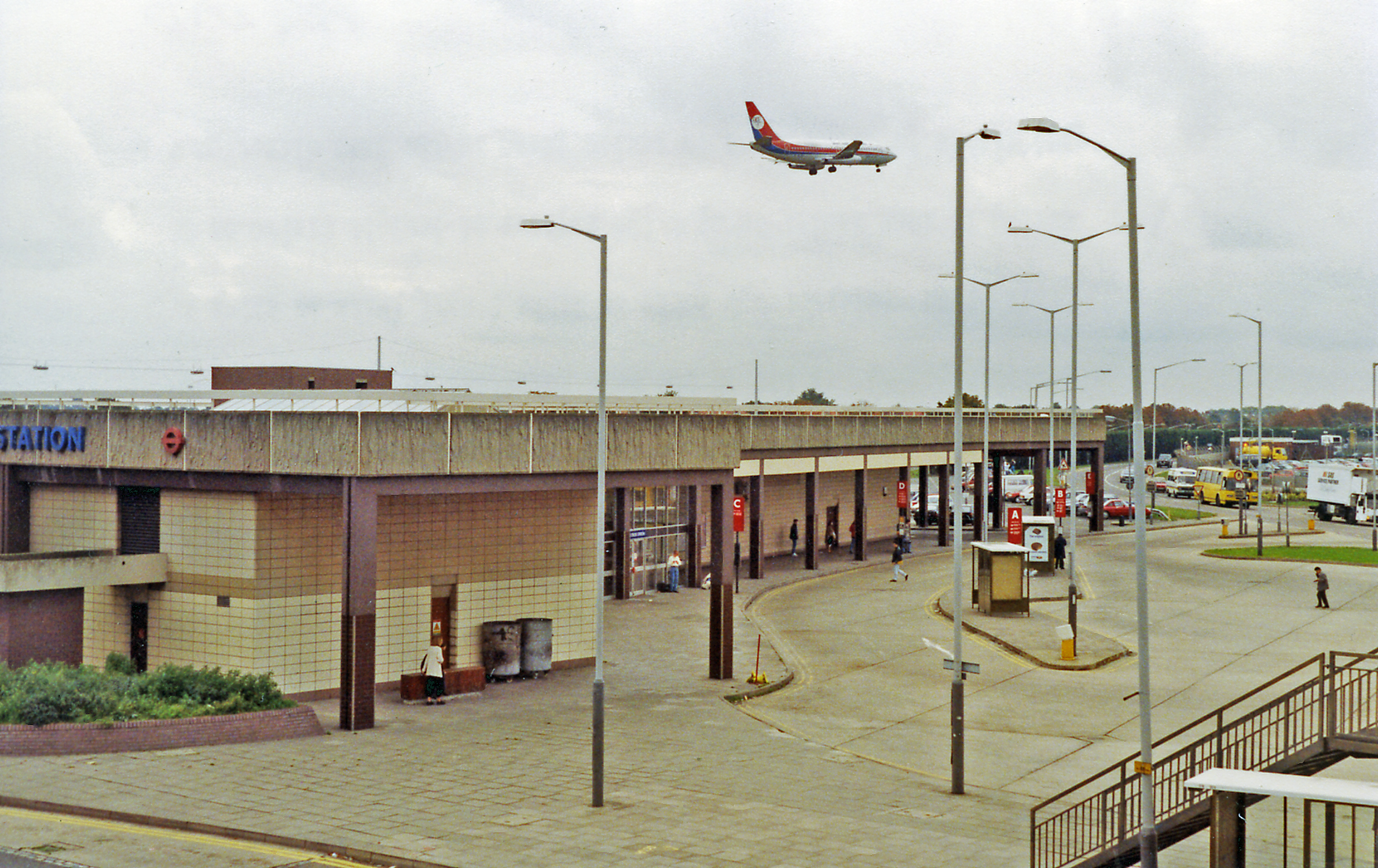
Northern exterior and bus station in 1992

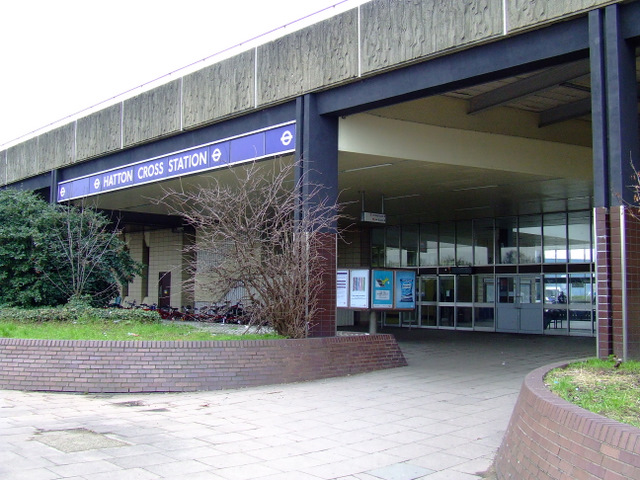
South entrance on Great South-West Road

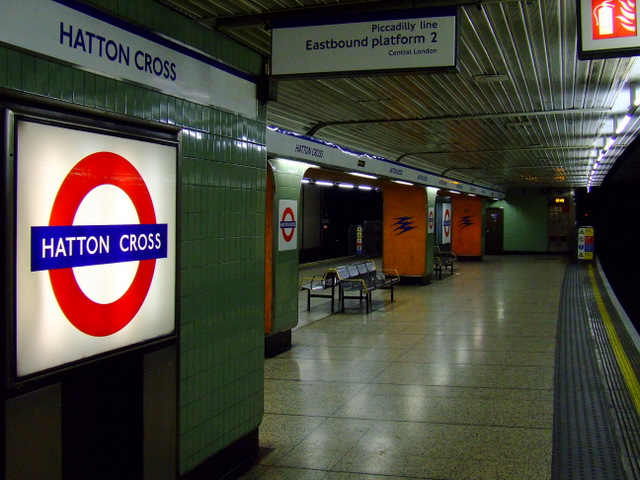
Platform with backlit roundel and speedbird mosaics on central columns

== Connections ==
London Buses routes 90, 203, 285, 423, 482, 490, H25, H26 and Superloop route SL7 serve the adjacent bus station.

== Incidents ==
The British Airways Flight 38 accident occurred just west of Hatton Cross in 2008.

Preceding station	London Underground	Following station
Heathrow Terminals 2 & 3 towards Heathrow Terminal 5	Piccadilly line Heathrow branch	Hounslow West towards Cockfosters or Arnos Grove
Heathrow Terminal 4 Terminus	Piccadilly line Heathrow branch	Hounslow West towards Cockfosters or Arnos Grove
