= Flight 38 =

Flight 38 may refer to:

- Braniff Flight 38, hijacked in 1972
- British Airways Flight 38, crash-landed in 2008
