= Myrtle Avenue, Hounslow =

Street in the London Borough of Hounslow

Coordinates: 51.4633°N 0.4269°W

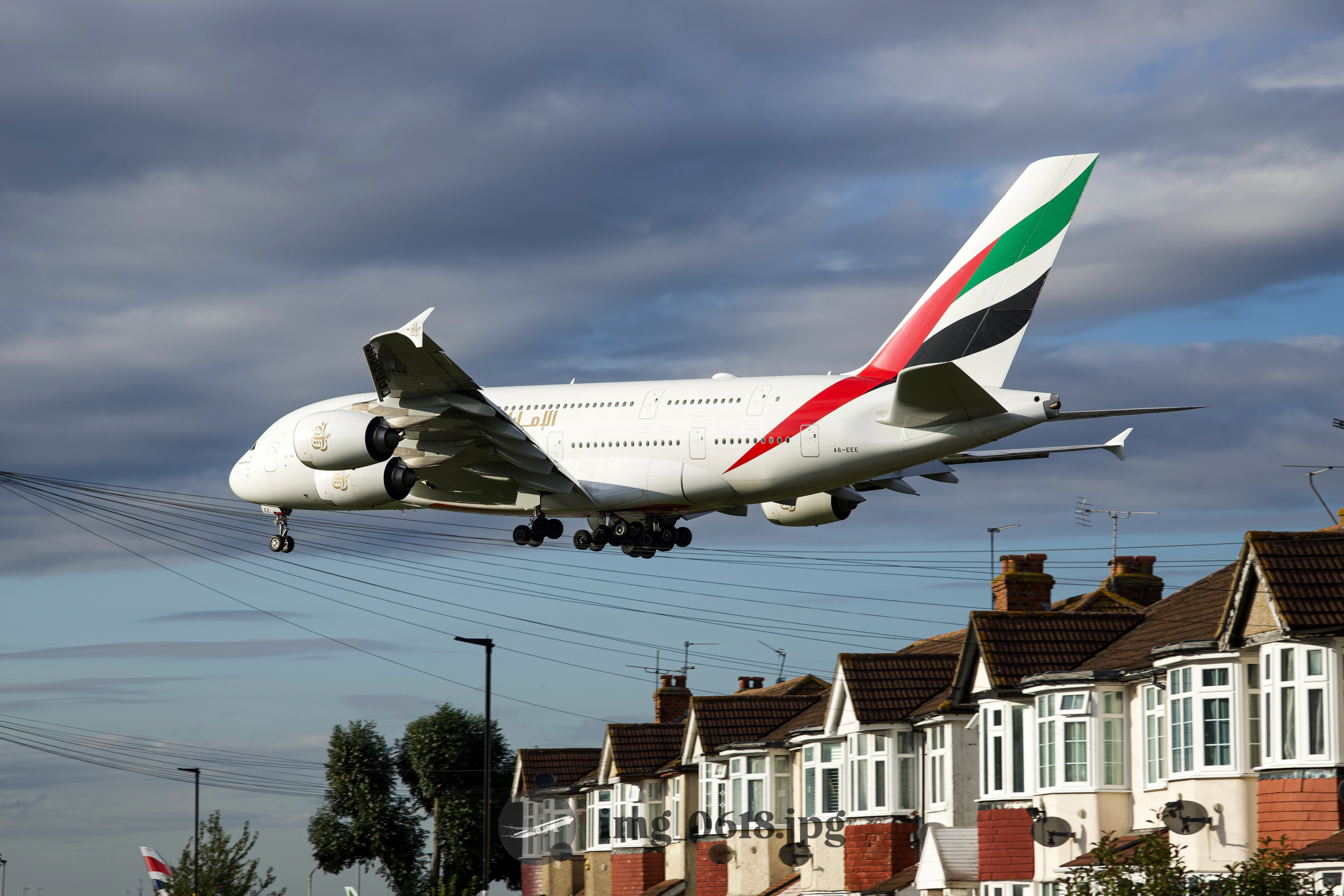
An Emirates Airbus A380 approaching Heathrow Airport's runway 27L in 2024 over Myrtle Avenue

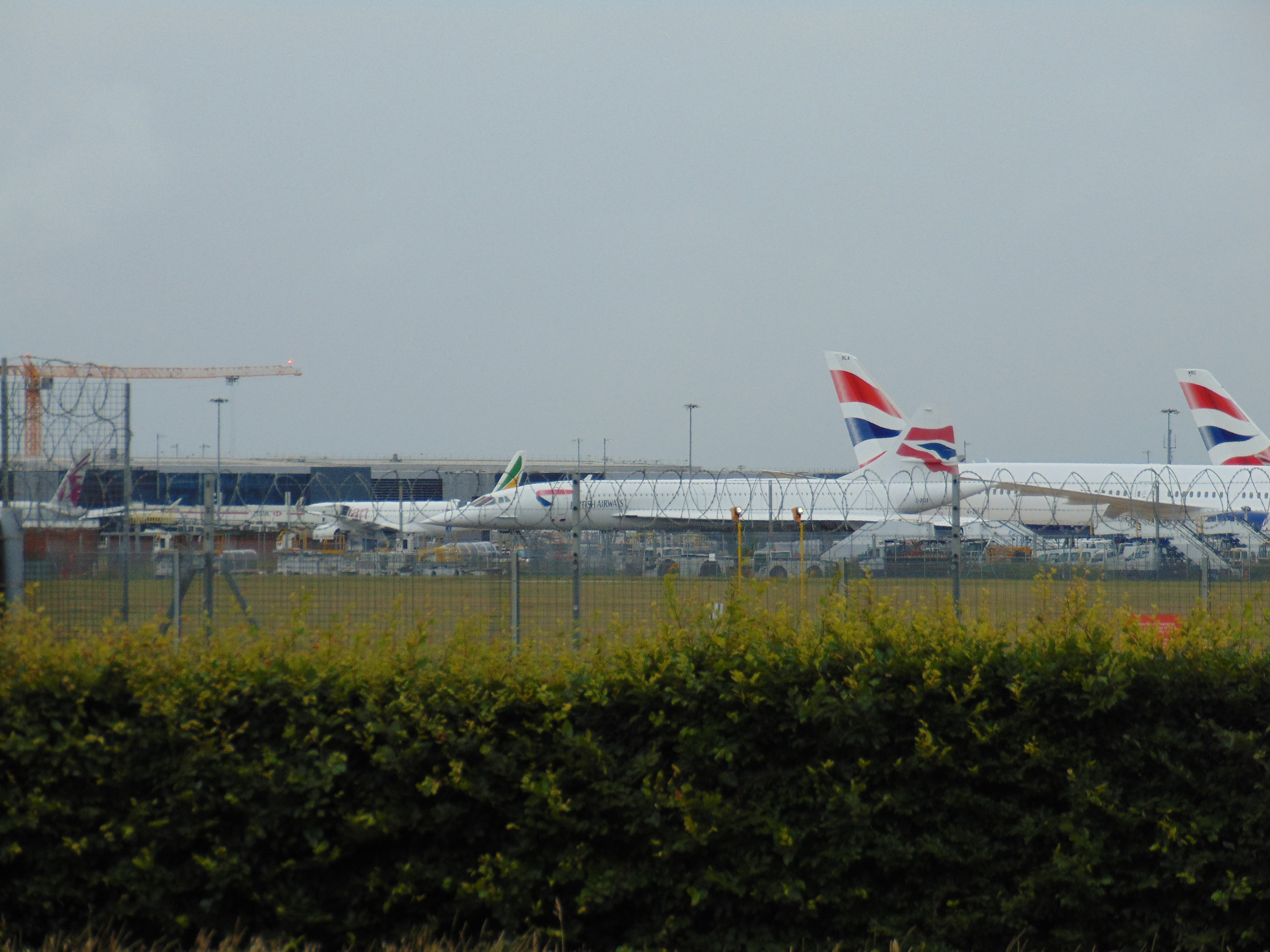
A view of the airport from Myrtle Avenue, July 2020. Visible in the centre of the image is Concorde G-BOAB, which has been preserved at the airport since its last flight to Heathrow in 2000.

Myrtle Avenue is a street in Hatton in the London Borough of Hounslow which is near the eastern end of Heathrow Airport's south runway, 27L. The street is noisy when aircraft are landing or taking off from 27L, or taking off from 09R, though its view of the aircraft has made it the prime location for plane spotting.

At the end of the road is a large green space which is directly underneath the flight paths to and from Runway 09R/27L. The nearest London Underground station to Myrtle Avenue is Hatton Cross on the Piccadilly line. On special occasions, such as the arrival of a new type of aircraft, there may be hundreds of spectators there, including the general public as well as regular spotters.

On 17 January 2008, British Airways Flight 38 narrowly overflew the street and the adjacent A30 road while undertaking an emergency landing following fuel starvation due to ice building up in the fuel/oil heat exchangers of the Boeing 777 operating the flight.

== In popular culture ==
Floating Points references the avenue in his song "Myrtle Avenue".
