= Rolls-Royce Trent 800 =

Turbofan engine produced by Rolls-Royce beginning 1993

Trent 800
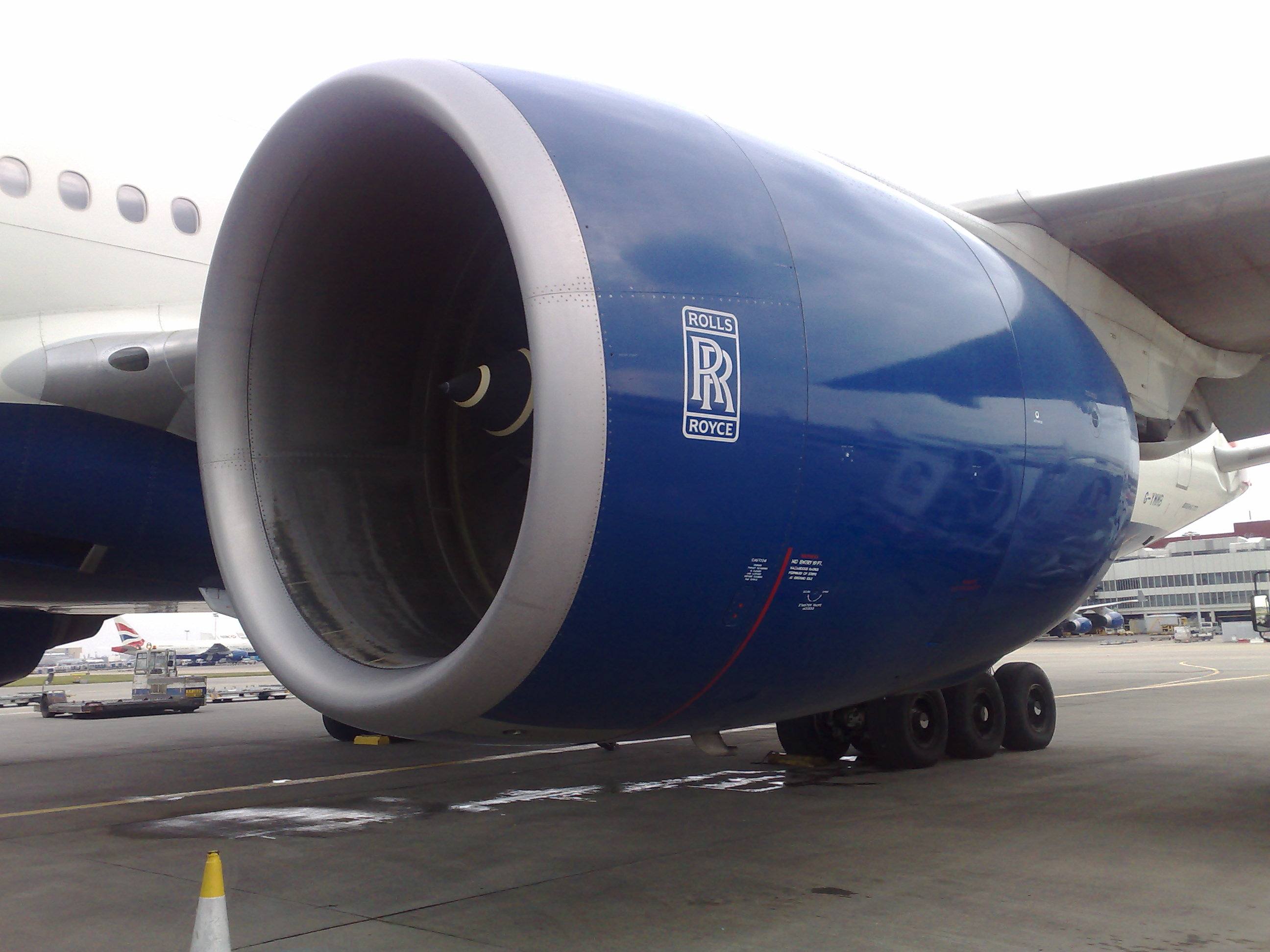
- Boeing 777 nacelle
- Type: Turbofan
- National origin: United Kingdom
- Manufacturer: Rolls-Royce plc
- First run: September 1993
- Major applications: Boeing 777
- Manufactured: 1993–2010
- Developed from: Rolls-Royce Trent 700
- Developed into: Rolls-Royce Trent 500; Rolls-Royce Trent 900; Rolls-Royce MT30

The Rolls-Royce Trent 800 is a high-bypass turbofan produced by Rolls-Royce plc, one of the engine options for the first-generation Boeing 777 variants, also known as 777 Classics. Launched in September 1991, it first ran in September 1993, was granted EASA certification on 27 January 1995, and entered service in 1996. It reached a 40% market share, ahead of the competing PW4000 and GE90, and the last Trent 800-powered 777 was delivered in 2010. The Trent 800 has the Trent family three shaft architecture, with a 280 cm (110 in) fan. With a 6.4:1 bypass ratio and an overall pressure ratio reaching 40.7:1, it generates up to 413.4 kN (92,900 lbf) of thrust.

== Development ==
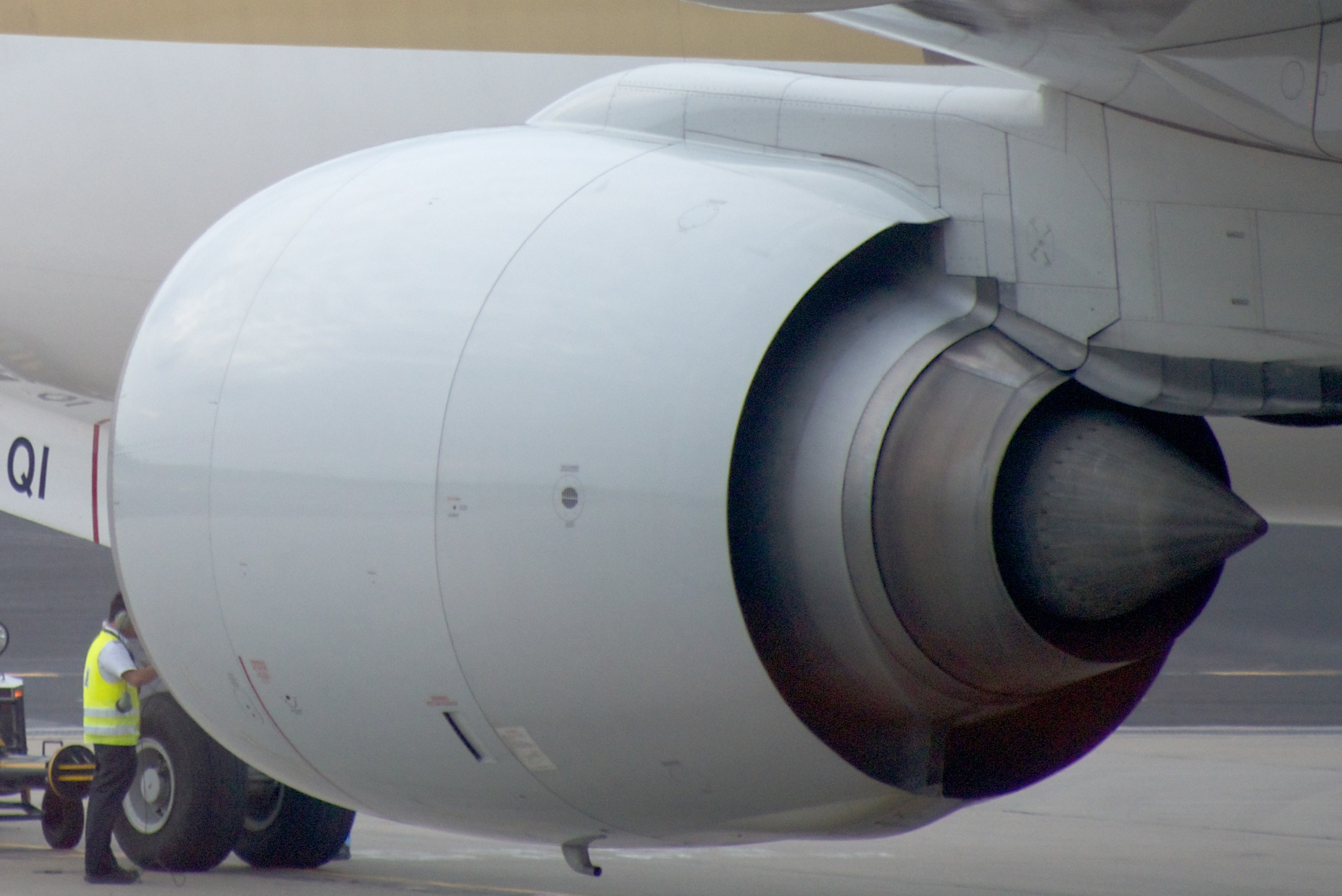
Rear view of a 777 nacelle with separate core and bypass flows

By 1990, as Boeing was studying the enlarged 767-X, Rolls-Royce was proposing its Trent engine with a larger 110 in (280 cm) fan driven by a new, bigger LP turbine, a modified IP compressor, and no exhaust mixer. It would attain 75,000 to 85,000 lbf (330 to 380 kN), to be certified in early 1995 for a mid-1995 introduction, with growth potential to 90,000–95,000 lbf (400–420 kN) with a new HP core.

Certification was applied for on 2 April 1992. By September 1992, its fan was to be tested in December, and a full test was planned for September 1993. Certification was granted by the EASA on 27 January 1995. The first Boeing 777 with Trent 800 engines flew on 26 May 1995, and ETOPS approval was granted by the FAA on 10 October 1996. The Trent 800 entered service on the Boeing 777 in 1996, with Thai Airways on 31 March. By June 1998, the 33-aircraft fleet had a Trent 800 dispatch reliability of over 99.96%.

After being rebuffed by British Airways, who selected the GE90 for their initial batch of Boeing 777s, Rolls-Royce launched the Trent 800 in September 1991 with a £250 million ($432.5 million) order from Thai Airways for their 15 Boeing 777s, with first deliveries for January 1996. In 1995, the Trent 800 won a large order from Singapore Airlines, a traditional Pratt & Whitney customer. The Singapore order was followed by large orders from American Airlines and Delta Air Lines. British Airways announced in September 1998 that it was returning to Rolls-Royce for its second batch of 777s, and did so again in April 2007. Other major operators of Trent 800-powered 777s include Air New Zealand and Kenya Airways. In 1996, Rolls-Royce had a 32% market share, above GE but behind PW. By July 1999, Rolls had won 45% of all engine orders for the 777. The Trent 800 later reached a 40% share of the engine market on the 777 variants for which it is available. The last Trent 800-powered 777 was delivered in 2010.

Rolls-Royce had unsuccessfully offered the Trent 8104 for the second-generation 777 (originally 777-X, eventually produced for the -300ER, -200LR, 777-200LRF and 777F). However Boeing selected GE Aviation as the exclusive engine supplier for the second-generation 777 with high-output derivatives of the General Electric GE90, and again for the third-generation Boeing 777X (-8, -9) which will be equipped by the General Electric GE9X.

As of 2014, Rolls-Royce is offering an upgraded version of the engine, known as the Trent 800EP. It incorporates technology from Trent 1000 and Trent XWB engines, including elliptical leading edges on intermediate- and high-pressure compressor blades. Rolls-Royce claims that it provides a 0.7% fuel-burn benefit.

== Design ==
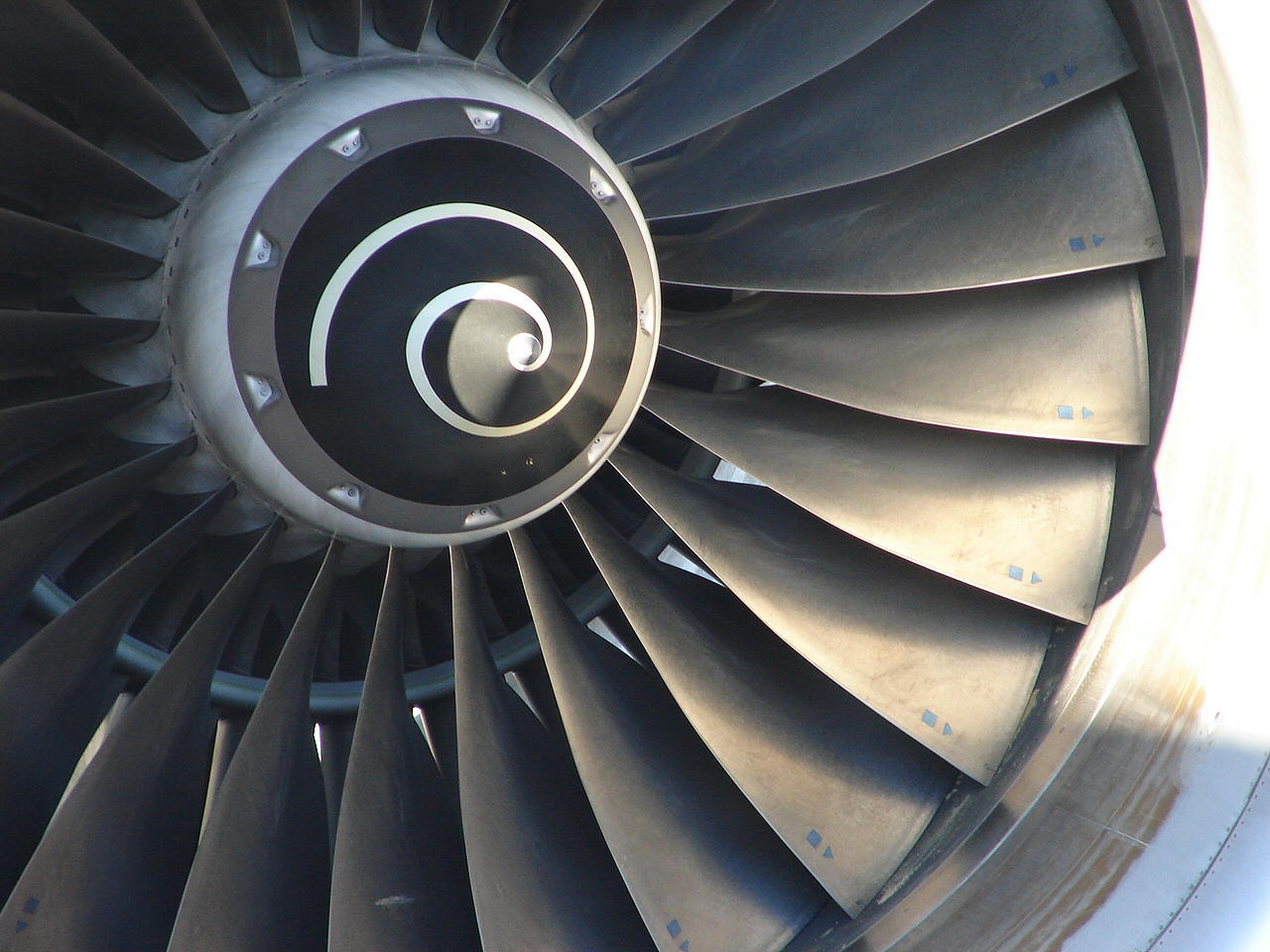
The 280 cm (110 in) fan has 26 wide chord titanium fan blades.

The Trent 800 is an axial flow, high bypass turbofan with three coaxial shafts. The fan is driven by a 5-stage axial LP turbine (3300 rpm), the 8-stage IP compressor (7000 rpm), and the 6-stage HP compressor (10611 rpm), each powered by a single-stage turbine. It has an annular combustor with 24 fuel nozzles and is controlled by an EEC. The engine has a 6.4:1 bypass ratio in cruise and an overall pressure ratio of 33.9 to 40.7:1 at sea level, for a 340.6–413.4 kN (76,600–92,900 lbf) take-off thrust. The 280 cm (110 in) fan has 26 diffusion bonded, wide chord titanium fan blades.

The Trent 800 is the lightest Boeing 777 engine, with a 8,000 lb (3.6 t) weight saving over the GE90 and 5,400–6,500 lb (2.4–2.9 t) over the PW4000. The Trent 800 weighs 6.078 t (13,400 lb) dry, while the GE90 is 17,400 lb (7.89 t), and the PW4000 is 16,260 lb (7.38 t).

Japanese Kawasaki Heavy Industries (KHI) and Marubeni Corporation are risk and revenue sharing partners on the Trent 800.

== Incidents ==
On 17 January 2008, a British Airways Boeing 777-236ER, operating as British Airways Flight 38 (BA038) from Beijing to London, crash-landed at Heathrow after both Trent 800 engines lost power during the aircraft's final approach. The subsequent investigation found that ice released from the fuel system had accumulated on the fuel-oil heat exchanger, leading to a restriction of fuel flow to the engines. On 26 November 2008, Delta Air Lines Flight 18 from Shanghai to Atlanta, a Trent 895-powered Boeing 777, experienced an "uncommanded rollback" of one engine while in cruise at 39,000 ft (12,000 m). The National Transportation Safety Board (NTSB) concluded the cause of both incidents was the same - ice clogging the inlet side of the fuel-oil heat exchanger (FOHE) of the affected engines.

These incidents, along with a similar incident in May 2009 involving an Airbus A330 with Rolls-Royce Trent-700 engines, resulted in Airworthiness Directives mandating the replacement of the fuel-oil heat exchangers in similar Rolls-Royce Trent series engines. Rolls-Royce developed a modification to prevent the problem recurring that involved replacing a face plate that had many small protruding tubes with one that is flat.

== Variants ==
Data from EASA TCDS at sea level.

Model	Certification Date	Pressure Ratio	Max Take-off Thrust	Max Continuous Thrust
RB211 Trent 875-17	27 January 1995	33.9	340.6 kN (76,580 lbf)	276.5 kN (62,160 lbf)
RB211 Trent 877-17	27 January 1995	34.7	351.0 kN (78,910 lbf)	312.3 kN (70,210 lbf)
RB211 Trent 884-17	27 January 1995	37.5	380.0 kN (85,430 lbf)	312.3 kN (70,210 lbf)
RB211 Trent 884B-17	26 November 1999	37.5	380.0 kN (85,430 lbf)	312.3 kN (70,210 lbf)
RB211 Trent 892-17	13 November 1996	39.6	406.8 kN (91,450 lbf)	343.3 kN (77,170 lbf)
RB211 Trent 892B-17	16 April 1997	39.6	406.8 kN (91,450 lbf)	343.3 kN (77,170 lbf)
RB211 Trent 895-17	22 June 1999	40.7	413.4 kN (92,940 lbf)	343.3 kN (77,170 lbf)

=== Trent 884B-17 ===
The Trent 884B-17 is the hot and high variant of the Trent 884-17. They are structurally identical, the Trent 884B-17 has the same maximum continuous thrust as the Trent 884-17 between sea level and 12000ft and afterwards increases linearly to be as the same maximum continuous thrust as Trent 892-17 at 25000ft and above. Therefore enabling a better climbing performance.

Trent 884B-17 engine on Cathay Pacific’s second hand 777-31H, modified from former operator Emirates’ Trent 892-17

Cathay Pacific is the type’s launch customer and modified the Trent 884-17 engines which originally equipped on the company’s Boeing 777-300 into Trent 884B-17 due to Hong Kong Airport’s tight departure procedure altitude restrictions and the lack of climbing performance.

== Engines on display ==
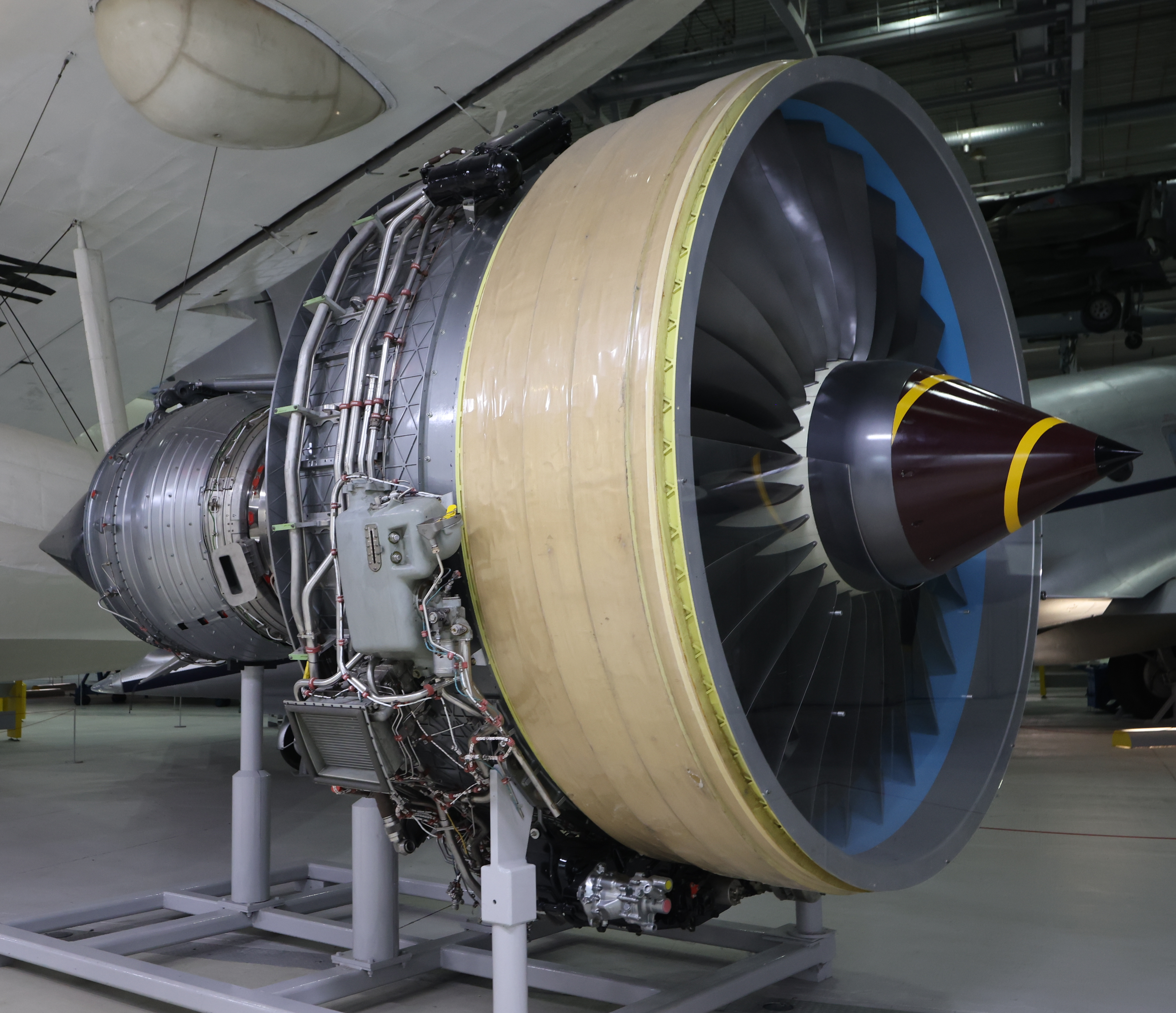
Rolls-Royce Trent 800 at Imperial War Museum Duxford

- A Trent 800 is on display at the Rolls-Royce Heritage Trust Collection, Derby
- A Trent 800 is on display at the Imperial War Museum Duxford, in the first hall

== Specifications (Trent 800) ==
Data from EASA

==== General characteristics ====
- Type: Three-shaft high bypass turbofan engine
- Length: 4,568 mm (179.8 in)
- Diameter: 280 cm (110 in)
- Dry weight: 6,078 kg (13,400 lb)

==== Components ====
- Compressor: Eight-stage IP axial compressor, six-stage HP axial compressor
- Combustors: Single annular combustor with 24 fuel injectors
- Turbine: Single-stage HP turbine, single-stage IP turbine, five-stage LP turbine

==== Performance ====
- Maximum thrust: 340.6-413.4 kN (76,580-92,940 lbf)
- Overall pressure ratio: 33.9-40.7:1
- Bypass ratio: 6.4:1
- Specific fuel consumption: 16.283 g/(kN⋅s) (0.575 lb/(lbf⋅h))
- Thrust-to-weight ratio: 5.7-6.9

== See also ==
Related development

- Rolls-Royce RB211
- Rolls-Royce MT30 marine engine

Comparable engines

- General Electric GE90
- Pratt & Whitney PW4000

Related lists

- List of aircraft engines
