= British Airways Flight 38 =

2008 aviation accident in England

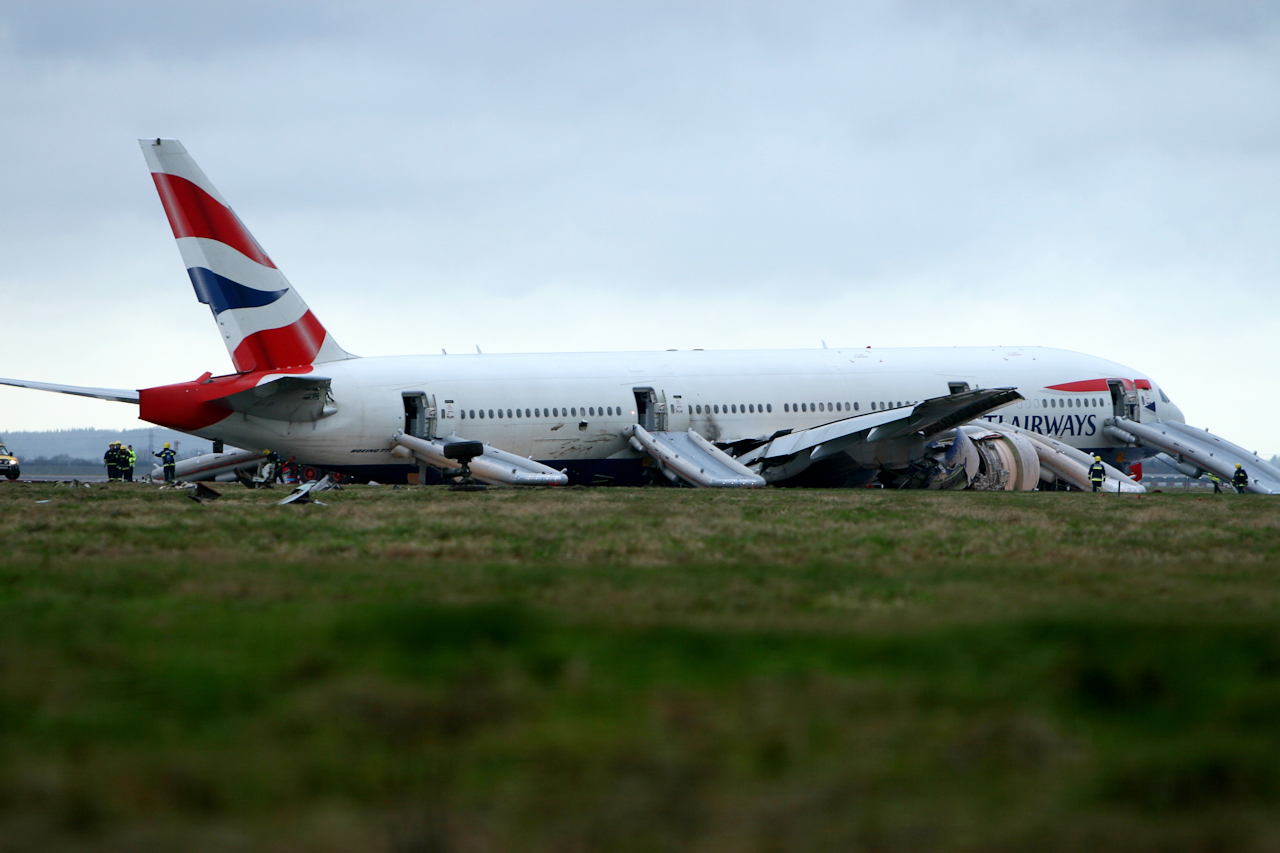
- The aircraft after crash landing at Heathrow Airport

Accident
- Date: 17 January 2008
- Summary: Crashed short of runway due to fuel starvation caused by ice in the fuel/oil heat exchangers
- Site: Heathrow Airport, London, England; 51°27′54″N 0°25′54″W

Aircraft
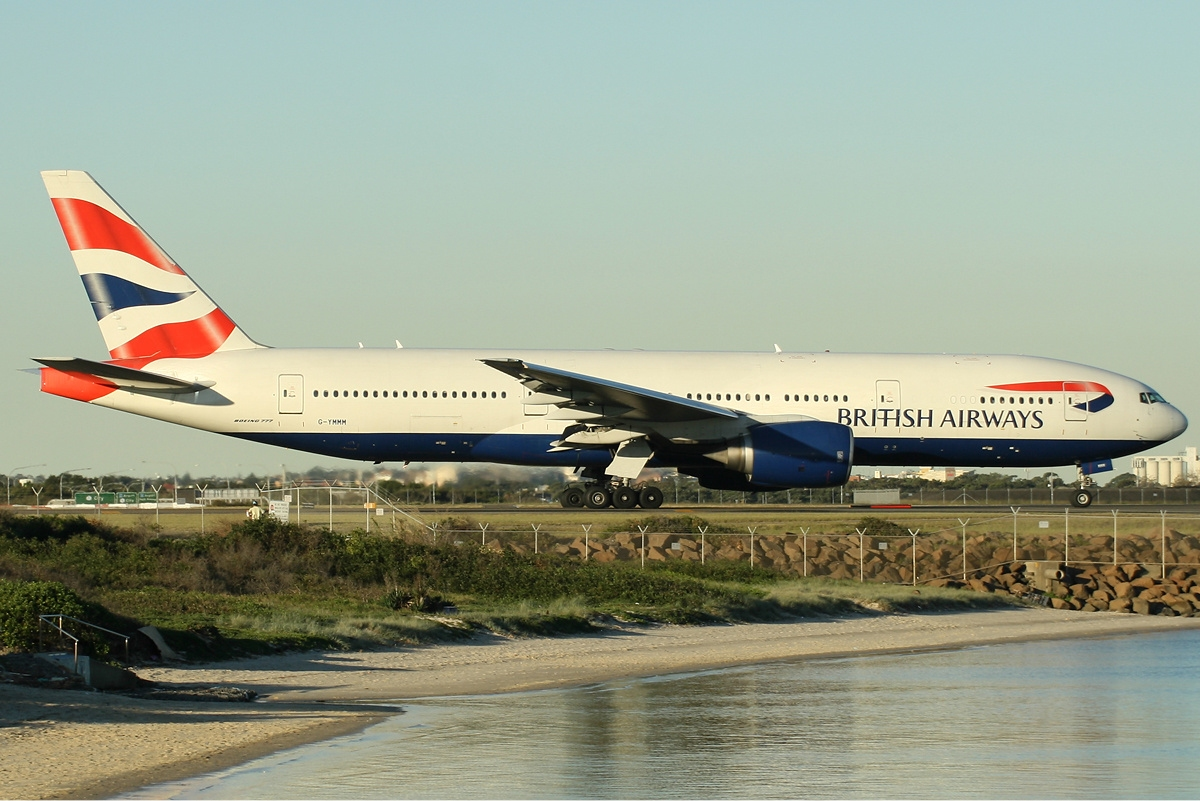
- G-YMMM, the aircraft involved in the accident, seen in 2007
- Aircraft type: Boeing 777-236ER (Note: The airliner was a Boeing 777-200ER model, with "ER" denoting the Extended Range variant. Boeing assigns a unique code for each company that buys one of its airliners, which is applied as a suffix to the model number at the time the aircraft is built, hence "777-236ER" designates a 777-200ER built for British Airways (customer code 36).)
- Operator: British Airways
- IATA flight No.: BA38
- ICAO flight No.: BAW38
- Call sign: SPEEDBIRD 38
- Registration: G-YMMM
- Flight origin: Beijing Capital International Airport, Beijing, China
- Destination: Heathrow Airport, London, United Kingdom
- Occupants: 152
- Passengers: 136
- Crew: 16
- Fatalities: 0
- Injuries: 47
- Survivors: 152

British Airways Flight 38 was a scheduled international passenger flight from Beijing Capital International Airport in Beijing, China, to Heathrow Airport in London, United Kingdom, an 8,100-kilometre (4,400 nmi; 5,000 mi) trip. On 17 January 2008, the Boeing 777 aircraft crash-landed short of runway 27L at Heathrow. Of the 152 people on board, 47 were injured, 1 of them seriously. The aircraft (registered as G-YMMM) sustained heavy damage and was written off as a result, becoming the first hull loss of a Boeing 777.

The accident was investigated by the Air Accidents Investigation Branch (AAIB) and their final report was issued in February 2010. Ice crystals in the jet fuel were blamed as the cause of the accident, clogging the fuel/oil heat exchanger (FOHE) of each engine. This restricted fuel flow to the engines when thrust was demanded during the final approach to Heathrow. The AAIB identified this rare problem as specific to Rolls-Royce Trent 800 engine FOHEs. Rolls-Royce developed a modification to the FOHE; the European Aviation Safety Agency (EASA) mandated all affected aircraft to be fitted with the modification before 1 January 2011. The US Federal Aviation Administration noted a similar incident occurring on an Airbus A330 fitted with Rolls-Royce Trent 700 engines and ordered an airworthiness directive to be issued, mandating the redesign of the FOHE in Rolls-Royce Trent 500, 700, and 800 engines.

== Background ==
=== Aircraft ===
The aircraft involved was a Boeing 777-236ER, registered as G-YMMM, with serial number 30314 and line number 342. It was built and delivered to British Airways in the spring of 2001 and powered by two Rolls-Royce Trent 895-17 engines and had a seating capacity of 233 passengers. On board, there were 16 crew members and 136 passengers.

=== Crew ===
The crew consisted of Captain Peter Burkill (43), Senior First Officer John Coward (41), First Officer Conor Magenis (35), and 13 cabin crew members. The captain had logged 12,700 total flight hours, with 8,450 in Boeing 777 aircraft. The senior first officer had logged 9,000 total flight hours, with 7,000 in Boeing 777 aircraft. The first officer had logged 5,000 total flight hours, with 1,120 in Boeing 777 aircraft.

== Accident ==
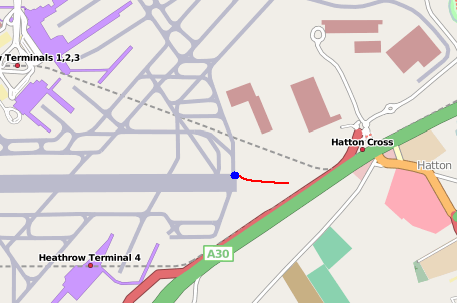
A map showing the location of the plane (blue dot) after landing and sliding through the field on the runway safety area – route marked in red

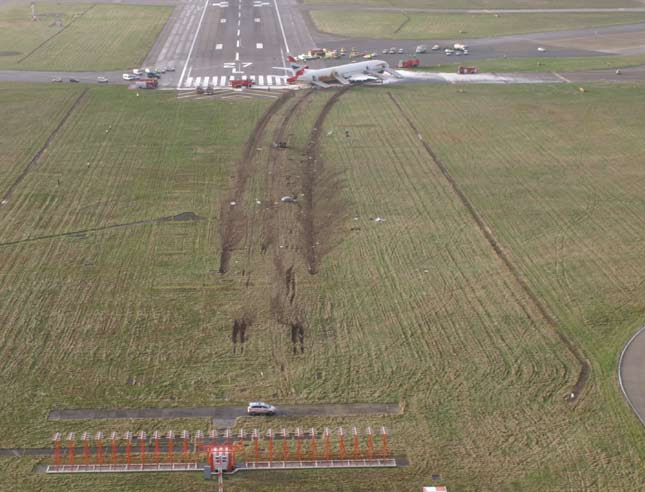
Path of G-YMMM from first ground contact until it came to rest in the taxiway at the corner of the approach end of runway 27L. The aircraft narrowly missed the red ILS antenna array in the foreground.

Flight 38 departed from Beijing at 02:09 Greenwich Mean Time (GMT), (Note: All times given in this article use the standard time zone of the United Kingdom (GMT), as this corresponds to the time at the national capital city, London. The city of Beijing, where the flight departed, is in fact in the China Standard Time (UTC+8:00) time zone.) flying a route that crossed Mongolia, Siberia, and Scandinavia, at altitudes between flight level 348 and 400—approximately 34,800 and 40,000 feet (10,600 and 12,200 m), and in temperatures between −74 °C (−101 °F) and −65 °C (−85 °F); the total air temperature has been estimated around −37 °C (−35 °F). Aware of the cold conditions outside, the crew monitored the temperature of the fuel, with the intention of descending to a lower and warmer level if any danger of the fuel freezing arose. This did not prove necessary, as the fuel temperature never dropped below −34 °C (−29 °F), still well above its freezing point. (Note: The specification for Jet A-1 fuel requires a maximum freezing point of −47 °C (−53 °F). Depending on its exact composition, the actual freezing point can be lower than this. Subsequent testing found that the fuel on board G-YMMM had a freezing point of −57 °C (−71 °F).)

Although the fuel itself did not freeze, small quantities of water in the fuel did. (Note: Jet fuel contains water, as a contaminant, in concentrations of up to 100 parts per million.) Ice adhered to the inside of the fuel lines, probably where they ran through the pylons attaching the engines to the wings. This accumulation of ice had no effect on the flight until the final stages of the approach into Heathrow, when increased fuel flow and higher temperatures suddenly released it back into the fuel. This formed a slush of soft ice that flowed forward until it reached the fuel/oil heat exchangers (FOHEs) (Note: The FOHE – one per engine – consists of 1,180 small-diameter steel tubes. The fuel flows through the tubes while the hot engine oil circulates around the outside. It is designed to provide two benefits: it warms the fuel to prevent ice reaching other engine components and simultaneously cools the engine oil.) where it froze once again, causing a restriction in the flow of fuel to the engines.

The first symptoms of the fuel-flow restriction were noticed by the flight crew at an altitude of 720 feet (220 m) and 2 miles (3.2 km) from touchdown, when the engines repeatedly failed to respond to a demand for increased thrust from the autothrottle. In attempting to maintain the instrument landing system glide slope, the autopilot sacrificed speed, which reduced to 108 knots (200 km/h; 124 mph) at 200 feet (61 m). The autopilot disconnected at 150 feet (46 m), as the first officer took manual control. Meanwhile, the captain reduced the flap setting from 30 to 25° to decrease the drag on the aircraft and stretch the glide.

At 12:42, the 777 passed just above the residential street of Myrtle Avenue, then immediately after overflew traffic on the A30 and the airport's Southern Perimeter road and landed on the grass about 270 metres (890 ft) short of runway 27L. The captain declared an emergency to air traffic control a few seconds before landing. The decision to raise the flaps allowed the plane to glide beyond the ILS beacon within the airport perimeter, thus avoiding more substantial damage.

During the impact and short slide over the ground, the nose gear collapsed rearward, the right main gear broke off and fully separated from the aircraft, puncturing the central fuel tank and penetrating the passenger oxygen supply, causing a major fuel leak and the release of oxygen gas from adjacent compartments. The right main landing gear also penetrated the cabin space, causing the sole serious injury in this accident to a passenger in seat 30K before striking the right-hand horizontal stabiliser's leading edge. The left main gear was pushed up through the wing root, as it was designed to do in case of failure due to excessive vertical load. The aircraft came to rest on the threshold markings at the start of the runway. 6,750 kg (14,880 lb) of fuel leaked, but no fire started. One passenger received serious injuries (concussion and a broken leg), and four crew members and eight passengers received minor injuries.

== Aftermath ==
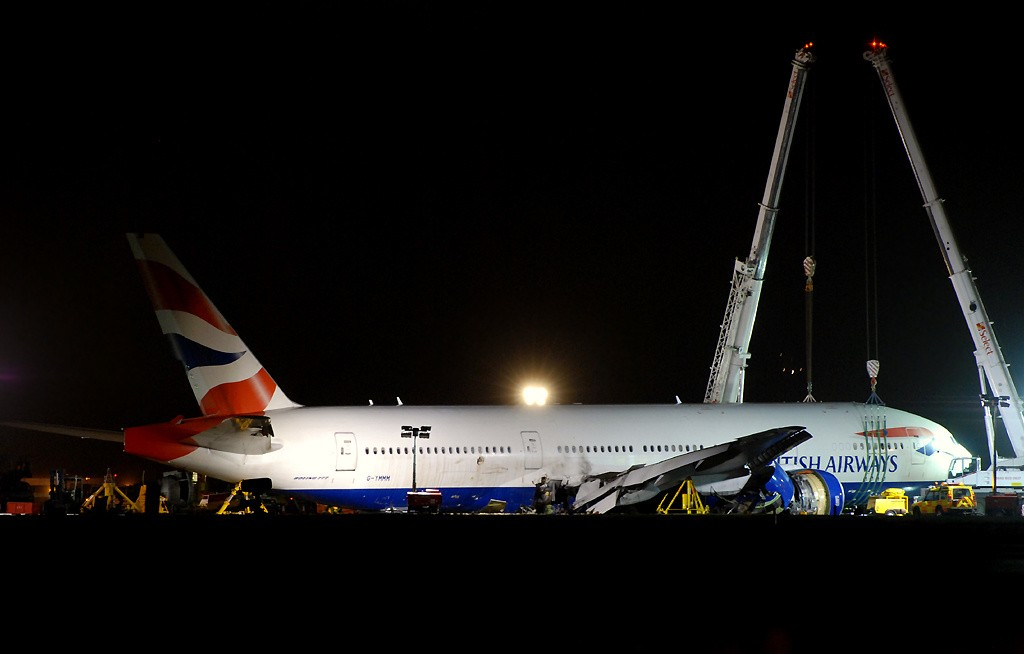
G-YMMM during recovery operations

The London Ambulance Service stated that three fast response cars, nine ambulances, and several officers were sent to the scene to assess the casualties. Those injured were taken to the nearby Hillingdon Hospital.

Willie Walsh, the British Airways chief executive, released a statement praising the actions of the "flight and cabin crew [who] did a magnificent job and safely evacuated all of the 136 passengers ... The captain of the aircraft is one of our most experienced and has been flying with us for nearly 20 years. Our crews are trained to deal with these situations." He also praised the fire, ambulance, and police services.

All flights in and out of Heathrow were halted for a short time after the accident. When operations resumed, many long-haul outbound flights were either delayed or cancelled, and all short-haul flights were cancelled for the rest of the day. Some inbound flights were delayed, and 24 flights were diverted to Gatwick, Luton, or Stansted. In an attempt to minimise further travel disruptions, Heathrow Airport received dispensation from the Department for Transport to operate some night flights. Even so, the following day (18 January), 113 short-haul flights were cancelled because crews and aircraft were out of position.

On the afternoon of 20 January 2008, the severely damaged aircraft and its wreckage (landing gears, fan blades, engine casings) were removed from the crash site by rescue, recovery workers and ground crews.

It was held up by a multitude of hydraulic jacks, lifted by cranes, lowered onto remote-controlled, wheeled long flatbed platforms, towed off the runway and then brought over to the BA maintenance area, parked on the apron just outside of a nearby hangar, where it stayed derelict for storage while the AAIB investigation concluded, in case if they needed the hull for tests, 500 metres from the crash site. The tail fin was dismantled and removed as it was rocking the hull on gusty days, placed onto the ground and painted white, in addition to the identifying marking and livery titles painted over as the top-half of the fuselage was barely visible over the surrounding fencing. After assessment of the damage and repair costs, the aircraft was deemed to be damaged beyond economic repair (despite still being largely intact) and written off by the insurers in the summer of 2008, becoming the first Boeing 777 hull loss in history. The hull of G-YMMM was cut up into three pieces, and in the early spring of 2009, a year after the incident, the plane was trucked out of Heathrow to the scrapyard, where it was broken up and scrapped. The dismantling and disposal was handled by Air Salvage International, based in Kemble.

During a press conference the day after the accident, Captain Peter Burkill said that he would not be publicly commenting on the cause of the incident while the AAIB investigation was in progress. He revealed that Senior First Officer John Coward was flying the aircraft, and that First Officer Conor Magenis was also present on the flight deck at the time of the accident. Coward was more forthcoming in a later interview, stating: "As the final approach started I became aware that there was no power ... suddenly there was nothing from any of the engines, and the plane started to glide."

Burkill and Coward were grounded for a month following the crash while they were assessed for post-traumatic stress disorder. Five months after the accident, Burkill flew again, taking charge of a flight to Montréal–Trudeau International Airport. He remained "haunted" by the incident, and took voluntary redundancy from British Airways in August 2009. Burkill subsequently established a blog and wrote a book, Thirty Seconds to Impact, that denounced BA's treatment of the situation following the crash. In November 2010, Burkill rejoined British Airways, stating, "I am delighted that the discussions with British Airways, have come to a mutually, happy conclusion. In my opinion, British Airways is the pinnacle of any pilot's career, and it is my honour and privilege to be returning to an airline that I joined as a young man."

All 16 crew were awarded the BA Safety Medal for their performance during the accident. The medal is British Airways' highest honour. On 11 December 2008 the crew received the President's Award from the Royal Aeronautical Society.

Until March 2024, British Airways continued to use the flight 38 designation on its Beijing to Heathrow route, before suspending the service in October 2024.

== Initial speculations ==
Mechanical engine failure was not regarded as a likely cause given the very low probability of a simultaneous dual engine failure. An electronic or software glitch in the computerised engine-control systems was suggested as possible causes of the simultaneous loss of power on both engines. Both engine and computer problems were ruled out by the findings of the February Special Bulletin.

Some speculation indicated that radio interference from Prime Minister Gordon Brown's motorcade, which was leaving Heathrow after dropping the Prime Minister off for a flight to China, was responsible for the accident. This interference was also eliminated as a cause.

Initial analysis from David Learmount, a Flight International editor, was that "The aircraft had either a total or severe power loss and this occurred very late in the final approach because the pilot did not have time to tell air traffic control or passengers." Learmount went on to say that to land in just 350–400 metres (1,150–1,310 ft), the aircraft must have been near stalling when it touched down. The captain also reported the aircraft's stall warning system had sounded.

A METAR issued twenty minutes before the crash indicated that the wind was forecast to gust according to ICAO criteria for wind reporting. The possibility of a bird strike was raised, but there were no sightings or radar reports of birds. Speculation had focused on electronics and fuel supply issues. A few weeks after the accident, as suspicion started to fall on the possibility of ice in the fuel, United Airlines undertook a review of their procedures for testing and draining the fuel used in their aircraft, while American Airlines considered switching to a different type of jet fuel for polar flights.

== Investigation ==
The Department for Transport's Air Accidents Investigation Branch (AAIB) investigated the accident, with the US National Transportation Safety Board, Boeing, and Rolls-Royce also participating. The investigation took two years to complete, and the AAIB published its final report on 9 February 2010. Three preliminary reports and 18 safety recommendations were issued during the course of the investigation.

The flight data recorder (FDR) and the cockpit voice recorder (CVR), along with the quick access recorder (QAR), were recovered from the aircraft within hours of the accident, and they were transported to the AAIB's Farnborough headquarters, some 30 miles (48 km) from Heathrow. The information downloaded from these devices confirmed what the crew had already told the investigators, that the engines had not responded when the throttles were advanced during final approach.

=== Fuel system ===
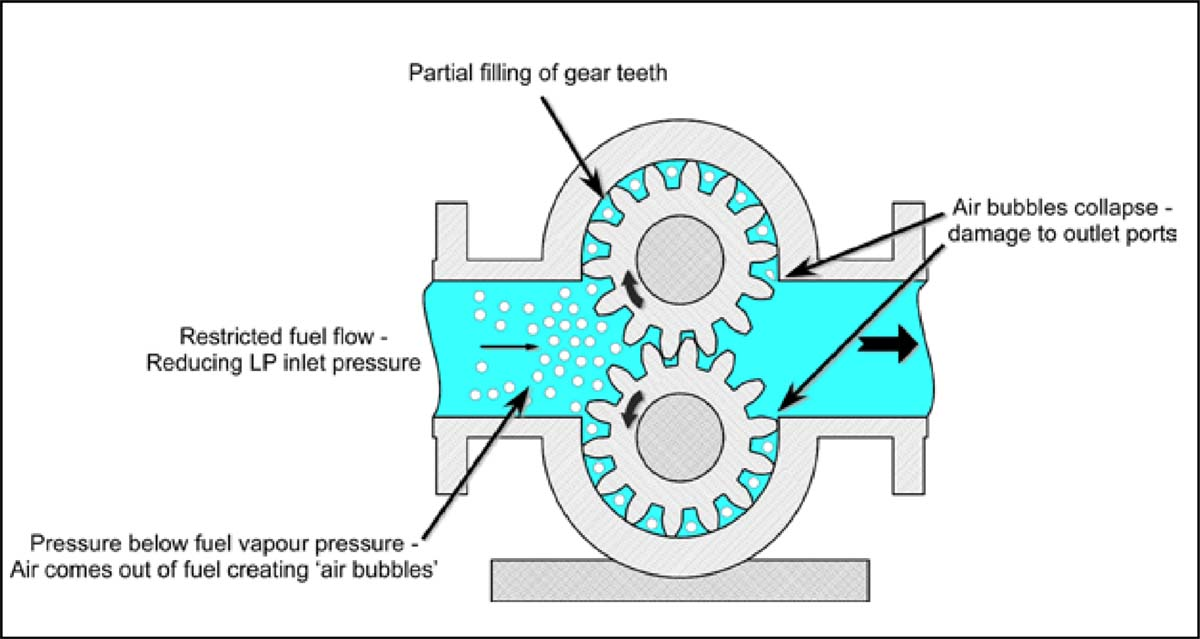
Illustration of cavitation in the high pressure fuel pumps used in the Trent 800 engines on the Boeing 777. When fuel flowing into the pump falls to very low pressure, gas bubbles form in the fuel. Bubble collapse on the high pressure side can cause damage to the pump's outlet ports.

This video shows cavitation in a gear pump similar to that used in the Boeing 777.

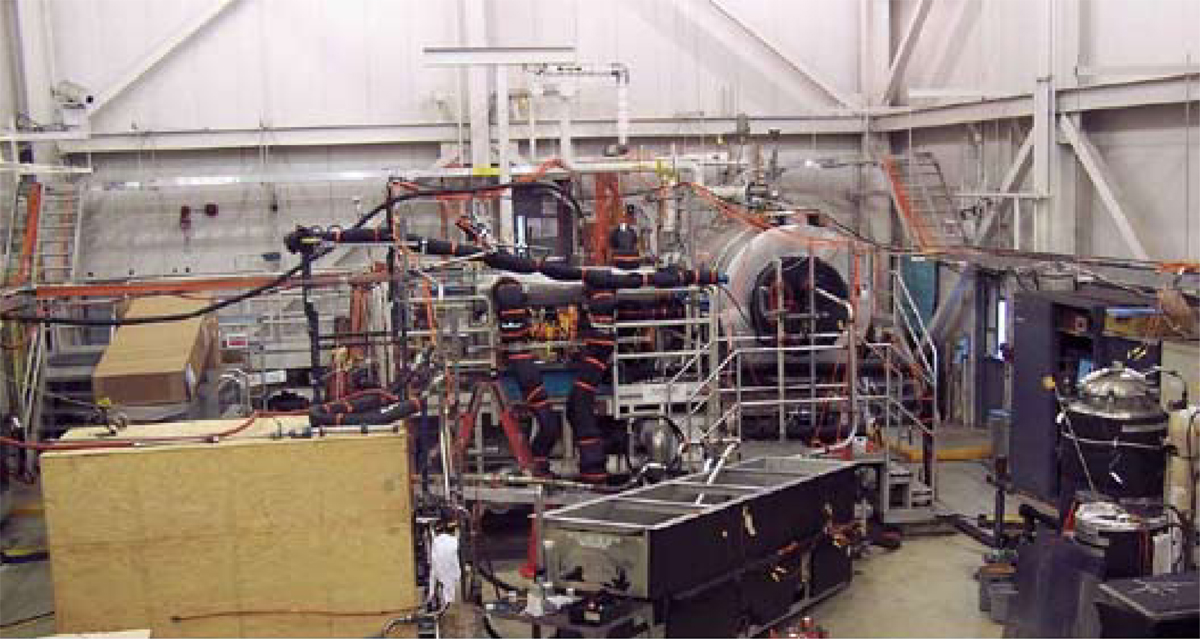
Mock-up of G-YMMM's fuel delivery system

In its Special Bulletin of 18 February 2008, the AAIB noted evidence that cavitation had taken place in both high-pressure fuel pumps, which could be indicative of a restriction in the fuel supply or excessive aeration of the fuel, although the manufacturer assessed both pumps as still being able to deliver full fuel flow. The report noted the aircraft had flown through air that was unusually cold (but not exceptionally so), and concluded that the temperature had not been low enough to freeze the fuel. Tests were continuing in an attempt to replicate the damage seen in the fuel pumps and to match this to the data recorded on the flight. A comprehensive examination and analysis was to be conducted on the entire aircraft and engine fuel system, including modelling fuel flows, taking account of environmental and aerodynamic effects.

The AAIB issued a further bulletin on 12 May 2008, which confirmed that the investigation continued to focus on fuel delivery. It stated, "The reduction in thrust on both engines was the result of a reduced fuel flow and all engine parameters after the thrust reduction were consistent with this." The report confirmed that the fuel was of good quality and had a freezing point below the coldest temperatures encountered, appearing to rule out fuel freezing as a cause. As in the aforementioned February bulletin, the report noted cavitation damage to the high-pressure fuel pumps of both engines, indicative of abnormally low pressure at the pump inlets. After ruling out fuel freezing or contamination, the investigation then focused on what caused the low pressure at the pump inlets. "Restrictions in the fuel system between the aircraft fuel tanks and each of the engine HP pumps, resulting in reduced fuel flows, is suspected." The fuel delivery system was being investigated at Boeing, and the engines at manufacturer Rolls-Royce in Derby.

The AAIB issued an interim report on 4 September. Offering a tentative conclusion, it stated:

The investigation has shown that fuel to both engines was restricted, most probably due to ice within the fuel feed system. The ice was likely to have formed from water that occurred naturally in the fuel whilst the aircraft operated for a long period, with low fuel flows, in an unusually cold environment, although, G-YMMM was operated within the certified operational envelope at all times.

— AAIB, Interim Report – Boeing 777-236ER, G-YMMM

The report summarised the extensive testing performed in an effort to replicate the problem suffered by G-YMMM. This included creating a mock-up of G-YMMM's fuel delivery system, to which water was added to study its freezing properties. After a battery of tests, the AAIB had not yet succeeded in reproducing the suspected icing behaviour and was undertaking further investigation. Nevertheless, the AAIB believed its testing showed that fuel flow was restricted on G-YMMM and that frozen water in the jet fuel could have caused the restriction, ruling out alternative hypotheses such as a failure of the aircraft's FADEC (computerised engine control system). The hypothesis favoured in the report was that ice had accreted somewhere downstream of the boost pumps in the wing fuel tanks and upstream of the engine-mounted fuel pumps. Either enough ice had accumulated to cause a blockage at a single point, or ice throughout the fuel lines had become dislodged as fuel flow increased during the landing approach, and the dislodged ice had then formed a blockage somewhere downstream.

As temperatures in flight had not dropped below the 777's designed operating parameters, the AAIB recommended Boeing and Rolls-Royce take interim measures on Trent 800-powered 777s to reduce the risk of ice restricting fuel delivery. Boeing did so by revising the 777 operating procedures so as to reduce the opportunities for such blockages to occur, and by changing the procedure to be followed in the event of power loss to take into account the possibility that ice accumulation was the cause.

The report went on to recommend that the aviation regulators (FAA and EASA) should consider whether other aircraft types and other engines might be affected by the same problem, and to consider changing the certification process to ensure that future aircraft designs would not be susceptible to the newly recognised danger from ice formation in the fuel.

The report acknowledged that a redesign of the fuel system would not be practical in the near term, and suggested two ways to lower the risk of recurrence. One was to use a fuel additive (FSII) that prevents water ice from forming down to −40 °C (−40 °F). Western air forces have used FSII for decades, and although it is not widely used in commercial aviation, it is nonetheless approved for the 777.

=== Rejected theories ===
The Special Bulletin of 18 February, stated "no evidence of a mechanical defect or ingestion of birds or ice" was found, "no evidence of fuel contamination or unusual levels of water content" was seen within the fuel, and the recorded data indicated "no anomalies in the major aircraft systems". Some small foreign bodies, however, were detected in the fuel tanks, although these were later concluded to have had no bearing on the accident.

The Special Bulletin of 12 May 2008 specifically ruled out certain other possible causes, stating: "There is no evidence of a wake vortex encounter, a bird strike, or core engine icing. There is no evidence of any anomalous behaviour of any of the aircraft or engine systems that suggests electromagnetic interference."

=== Probable cause ===
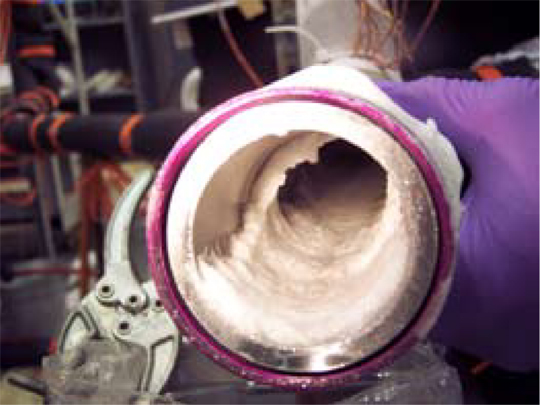
Accreted ice in a fuel system test rig used to investigate the crash of BA Flight 38 (G-YMMM). This ice accumulation did not cause the failure. It was when this ice was released at a warmer temperature and higher fuel flow that it flowed downstream, blocking fuel flow into the fuel/oil heat exchangers (FOHE) in both engines.

The AAIB issued a full report on 9 February 2010. It concluded:

The investigation identified that the reduction in thrust was due to restricted fuel flow to both engines.

The investigation identified the following probable causal factors that led to the fuel flow restrictions:

1. Accreted ice from within the fuel system released, causing a restriction to the engine fuel flow at the face of the FOHE, on both of the engines.
2. Ice had formed within the fuel system, from water that occurred naturally in the fuel, whilst the aircraft operated with low fuel flows over a long period and the localised fuel temperatures were in an area described as the 'sticky range'.
3. The FOHE, although compliant with the applicable certification requirements, was shown to be susceptible to restriction when presented with soft ice in a high concentration, with a fuel temperature that is below −10 °C and a fuel flow above flight idle.
4. Certification requirements, with which the aircraft and engine fuel systems had to comply, did not take account of this phenomenon as the risk was unrecognised at that time.

— AAIB, Report on the accident to Boeing 777-236ER, G-YMMM, at London Heathrow Airport on 17 January 2008

=== Other findings ===
The AAIB also studied the crashworthiness of the aircraft during the accident sequence. It observed that the main attachment point for the main landing gear was the rear spar of the aircraft's wing; because this spar also formed the rear wall of the main fuel tanks, the crash landing caused the tanks to rupture. The report recommended that Boeing redesign the landing gear attachment to reduce the likelihood of fuel loss in similar circumstances.

The report went on to note that the fire extinguisher handles had been manually deployed by the crew before the fuel shut-off switches. The fire extinguisher handles also have the effect of cutting off power to the fuel switches, meaning that the fuel may continue to flow – a potentially dangerous situation. The report restated a previous Boeing Service Bulletin giving procedural advice that fuel switches should be operated before fire handles. It went on: "This was not causal to the accident, but could have had serious consequences in the event of a fire during the evacuation." Indeed, the need to issue Safety Recommendation 2008–2009, affecting all 777 airframes, which had yet to incorporate the Boeing Service Bulletin (SB 777-28-0025) – as was the case with G-YMMM – was given as the main reason for issuing the first special bulletin, well before the accident investigation itself was complete.

== Similar incidents ==
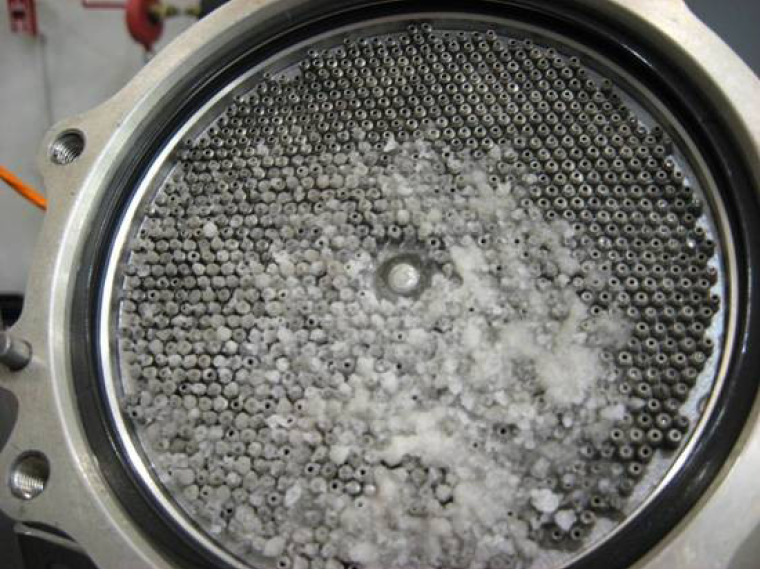
Laboratory duplication of ice crystals clogging the FOHE on a Rolls-Royce Trent 800 series engine taken from the NTSB report addressing the incidents of BA Flight 38 and DL Flight 18.

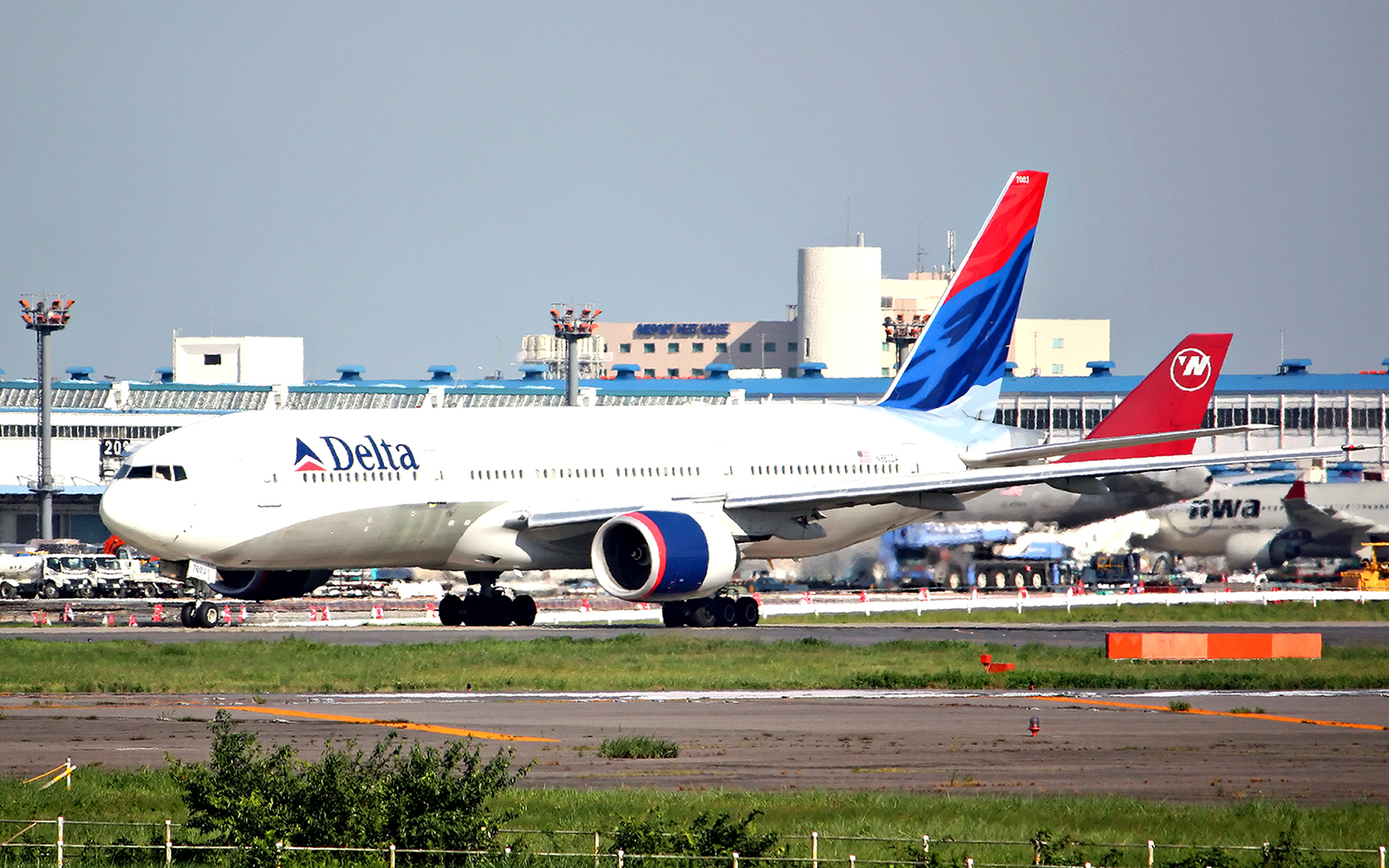
N862DA, the aircraft involved in the Delta Air Lines incident, seen in 2009

On 26 November 2008, Delta Air Lines Flight 18 from Shanghai to Atlanta, another Trent 800-powered Boeing 777, experienced an "uncommanded rollback" of one engine while in cruise at 39,000 feet (12,000 m). The crew followed manual recovery procedures and the flight continued without incident. The US NTSB assigned one of the investigators who worked on the BA Flight 38 investigation to this incident, and looked specifically for any similarity between the two incidents. The NTSB Safety Recommendation report concluded that ice clogging the FOHE was the likely cause. The evidence was stronger in this case since data from the flight data recorder allowed the investigators to locate where the fuel flow was restricted.

In early 2009, Boeing sent an update to aircraft operators, linking the British Airways and Delta Air Lines "uncommanded rollback" incidents, and identifying the problem as specific to the Rolls-Royce engine FOHEs. Originally, other aircraft were thought to be unaffected by the problem. However, in May 2009, another similar incident happened with an Airbus A330 powered by a Trent series 700 engine.

The enquiries led Boeing to reduce the recommended time that the fuel on 777 aircraft equipped with Rolls-Royce Trent 800-series engines be allowed to remain at temperatures below −10 °C (14 °F) from three to two hours.

On 11 March 2009, the NTSB issued urgent safety recommendation SB-09-11 calling for the redesign of the FOHEs used on Rolls-Royce Trent 800 Series engines. A build-up of ice from water naturally occurring in the fuel had caused a restriction of the flow of fuel to the engines of G-YMMM. Rolls-Royce had already started on redesigning the component, with an in-service date of March 2010 at the latest. All affected engines were to be fitted with the redesigned component within six months of its certification. In May 2010 the Airworthiness Directive was extended to cover the Trent 500 and 700 series engines, as well.

== Lawsuit ==
In November 2009, 10 passengers were announced to be suing Boeing over the incident in the Circuit Court of Cook County in Illinois, United States. The lawsuit alleged that the design of the aircraft was "defective and unreasonably dangerous", that Boeing "breached their duty of care", and also breached their "warranties of merchantability and fitness". Claims were settled out of court in 2012.

== In popular culture ==
The Discovery Channel Canada / National Geographic TV series Mayday featured the incident in the second episode of the tenth season episode titled "The Heathrow Enigma".

The aviation disaster podcast Black Box Down covered the incident in their episode "Crashed Feet Before the Runway." They subsequently released another episode, "Interview With Crash Survivor", which featured an interview with a passenger who was on board the flight during the incident.

== See also ==
- Aviation safety
- Cathay Pacific Flight 780 — an Airbus A330 that lost engine control shortly before landing at Hong Kong International Airport in 2010.
- British Airways Flight 009 — a Boeing 747 that lost all of the engine controls due to the engines ingesting volcanic ash in 1982.
- List of accidents and incidents involving commercial aircraft
- Runway safety area
