= Speedbird =

British Airways emblem and call sign

The Speedbird emblem.

The Speedbird is the stylised emblem of a bird in flight designed in 1932 by Theyre Lee-Elliott as the corporate logo for Imperial Airways. It became a design classic and was used by the airline and its successors – British Overseas Airways Corporation (BOAC) and British Airways – for 52 years. The term "Speedbird" is still the call sign for British Airways.

== History ==
=== Imperial Airways ===
House flag used by BOAC on boats serving flying boats.

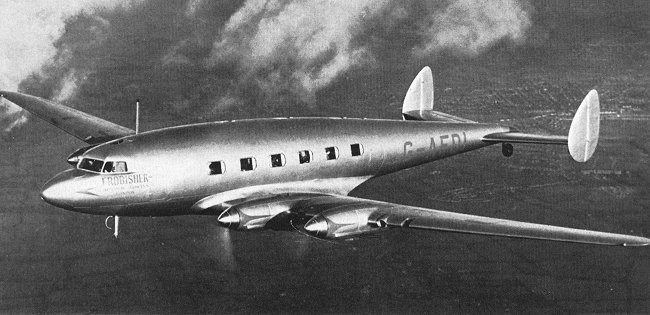
On the nose of "Frobisher" – an Imperial Airways de Havilland Albatross in 1938.

The original Speedbird was designed in 1932 for Imperial Airways by Theyre Lee-Elliott through Stuart Advertising Agency. A relief sculpture, which became the final version, was made by Barbara Hepworth. It was initially used on advertising posters and luggage labels. Later, it was applied to the nose section of the company's aircraft and could be seen for example in 1938 on the company's Short Empire S.30 flying boats.

=== BOAC ===
Speedbird in the BOAC logo ca. 1965

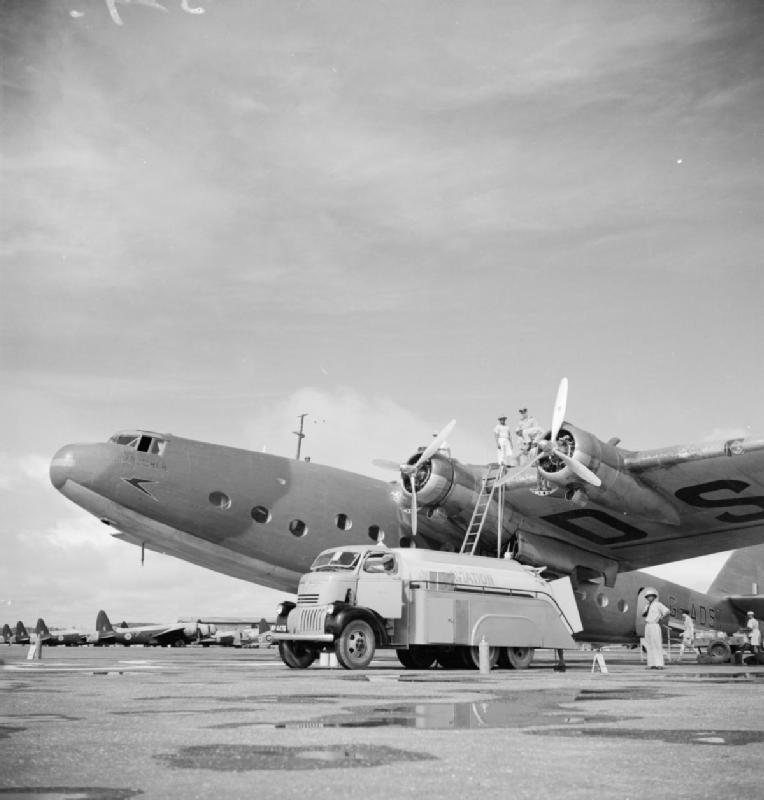
On the nose of a BOAC Armstrong Whitworth Ensign refuelling in Accra during WW2.

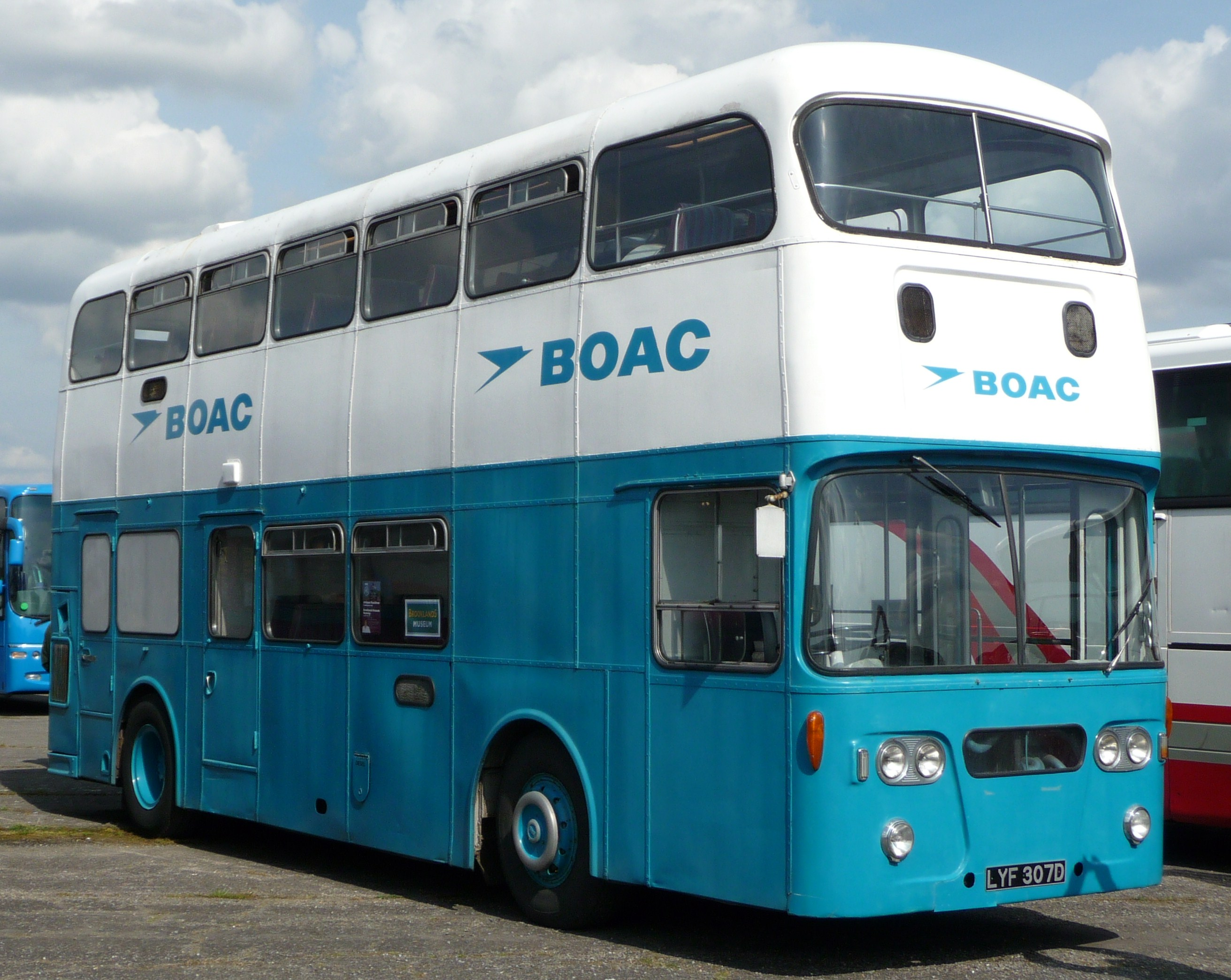
The Speedbird on a BOAC liveried Leyland Atlantean.

With the creation of BOAC in 1939 the logo was retained, continuing to appear on the noses of aircraft throughout World War II despite the military-style camouflage that had replaced the airline livery.

From 1950 BOAC gave the Speedbird greater prominence on the aircraft using it on the tail fin, either in navy blue on a white background or vice versa, and also using it widely elsewhere, such as on airport buses.

With the advent of air traffic control and the adoption of call signs to identify aircraft and their operators, BOAC chose the name of their now well-known logo, "Speedbird", as their call sign when in flight.

In the mid-1960s the design of the Speedbird was slightly altered, with a slimmer "body" and larger "wing", and on the tailfin coloured gold on a navy blue background. Elsewhere the colours used for it were mostly a combination of cyan and white.

=== British Airways ===
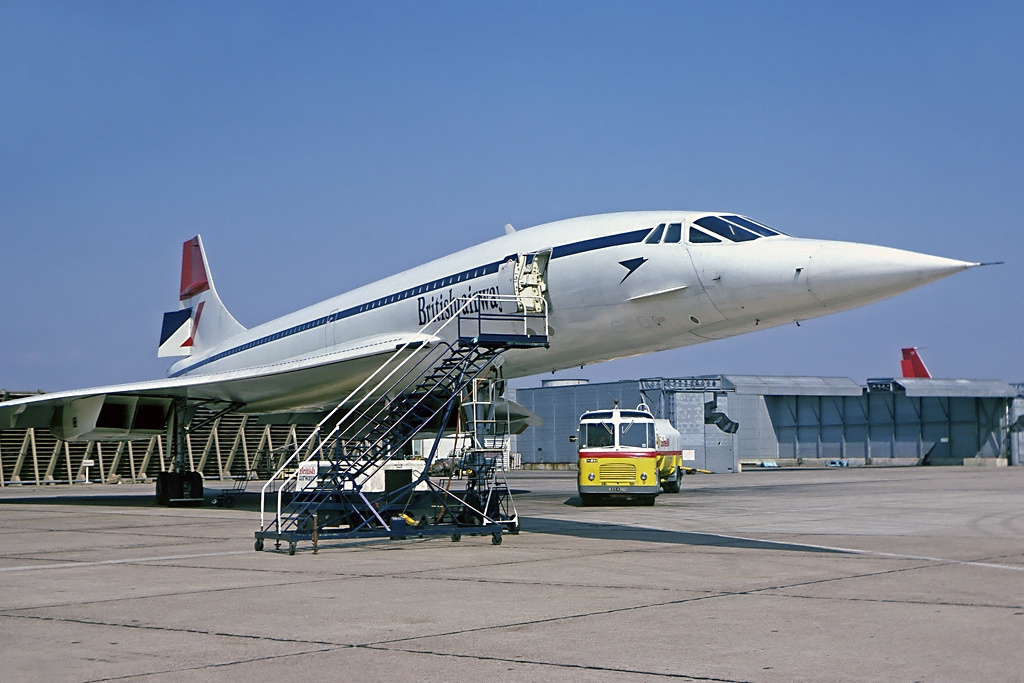
Speedbird logo on the nose of a British Airways Concorde

In 1974, BOAC was merged with British European Airways and others to form British Airways. The speedbird logo was retained unaltered, but returned to the nose section of the aircraft. A prominent Union Flag design now occupied the fin.

The Speedbird survived for another ten years, finally being retired in December 1984. It was replaced by the Speedwing, which was itself replaced by the current Speedmarque in 1997.

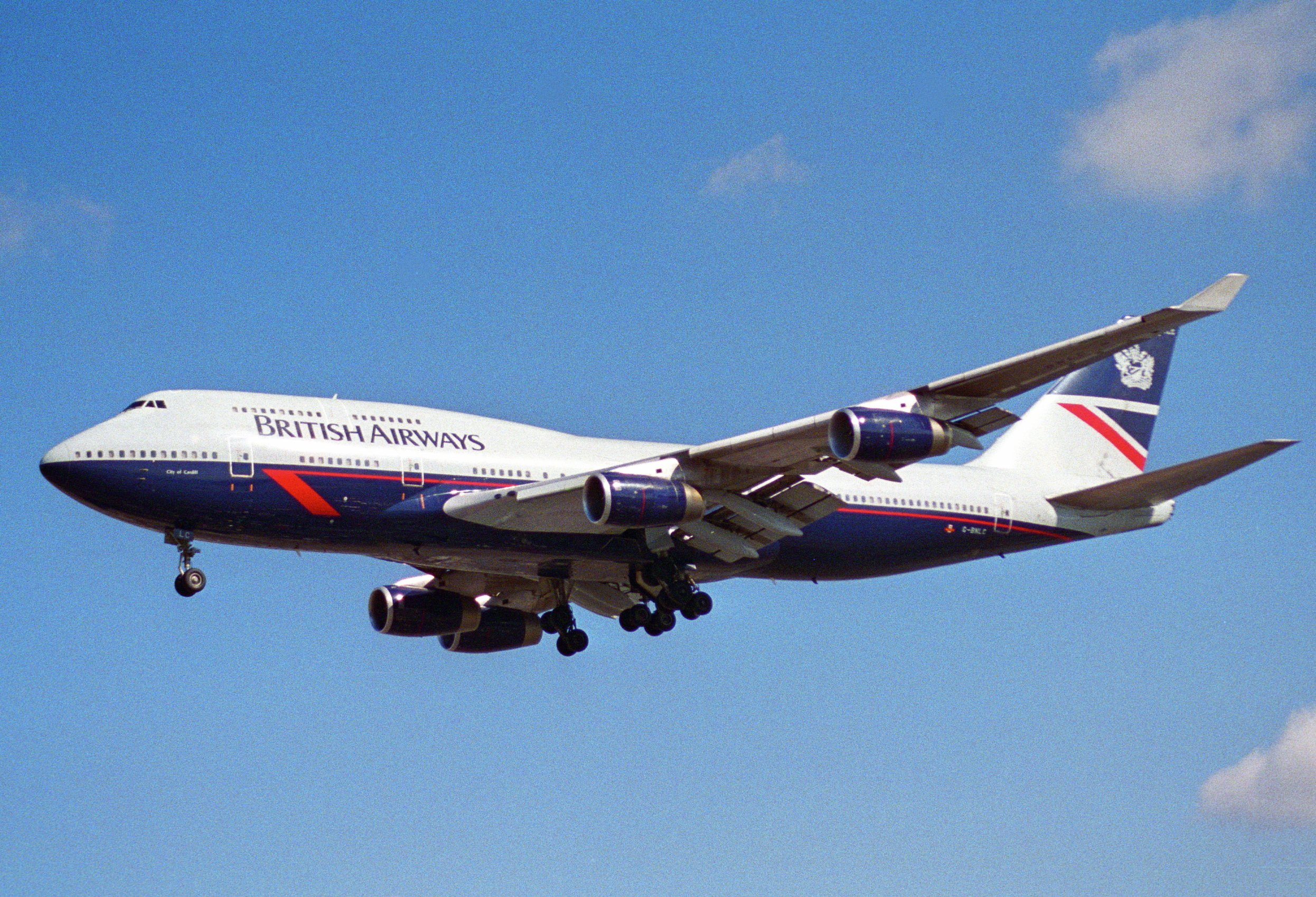
Boeing 747-400 displaying the post-1984 Speedwing.

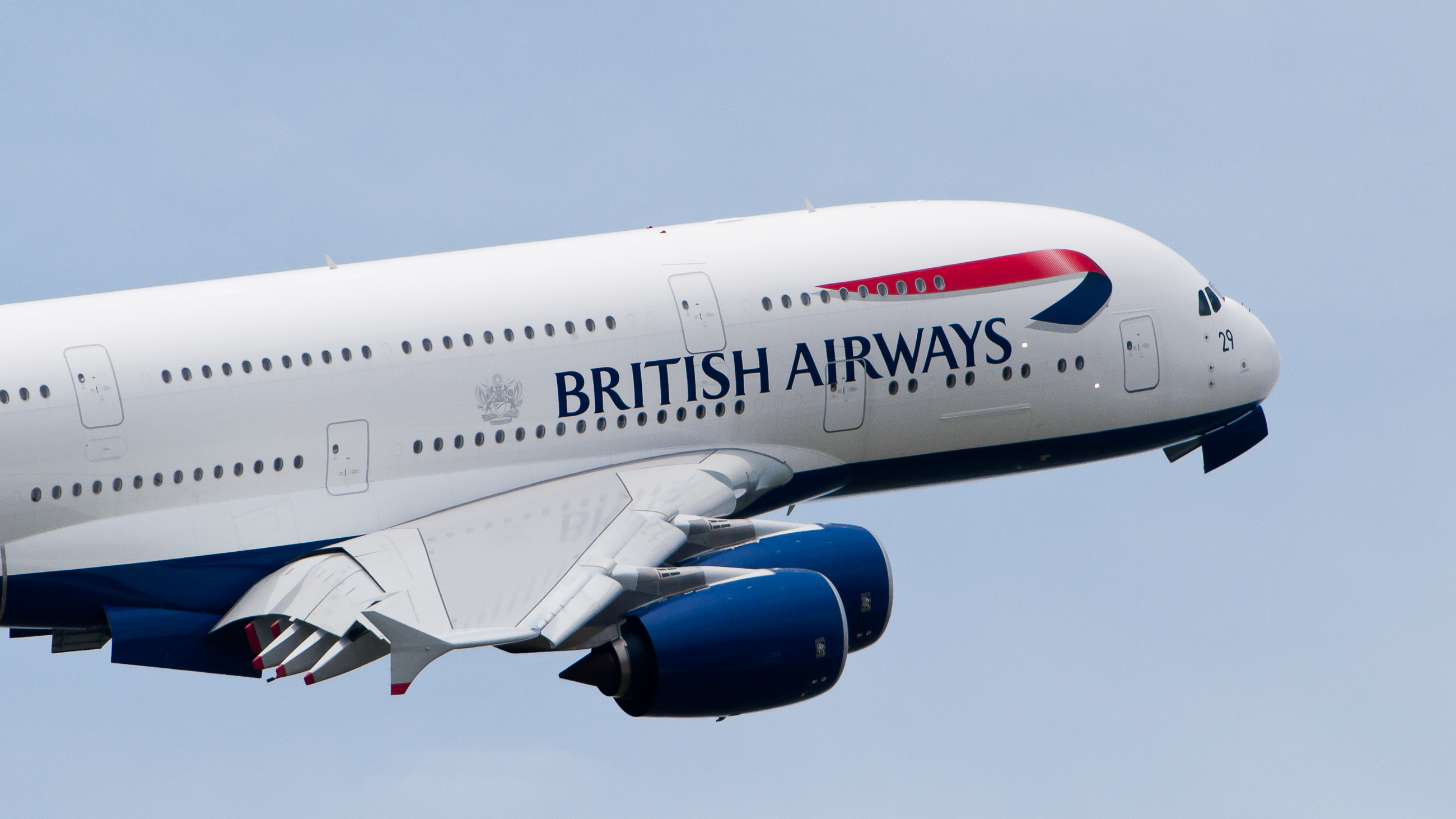
Airbus A380 sporting the post-1997 Speedmarque.

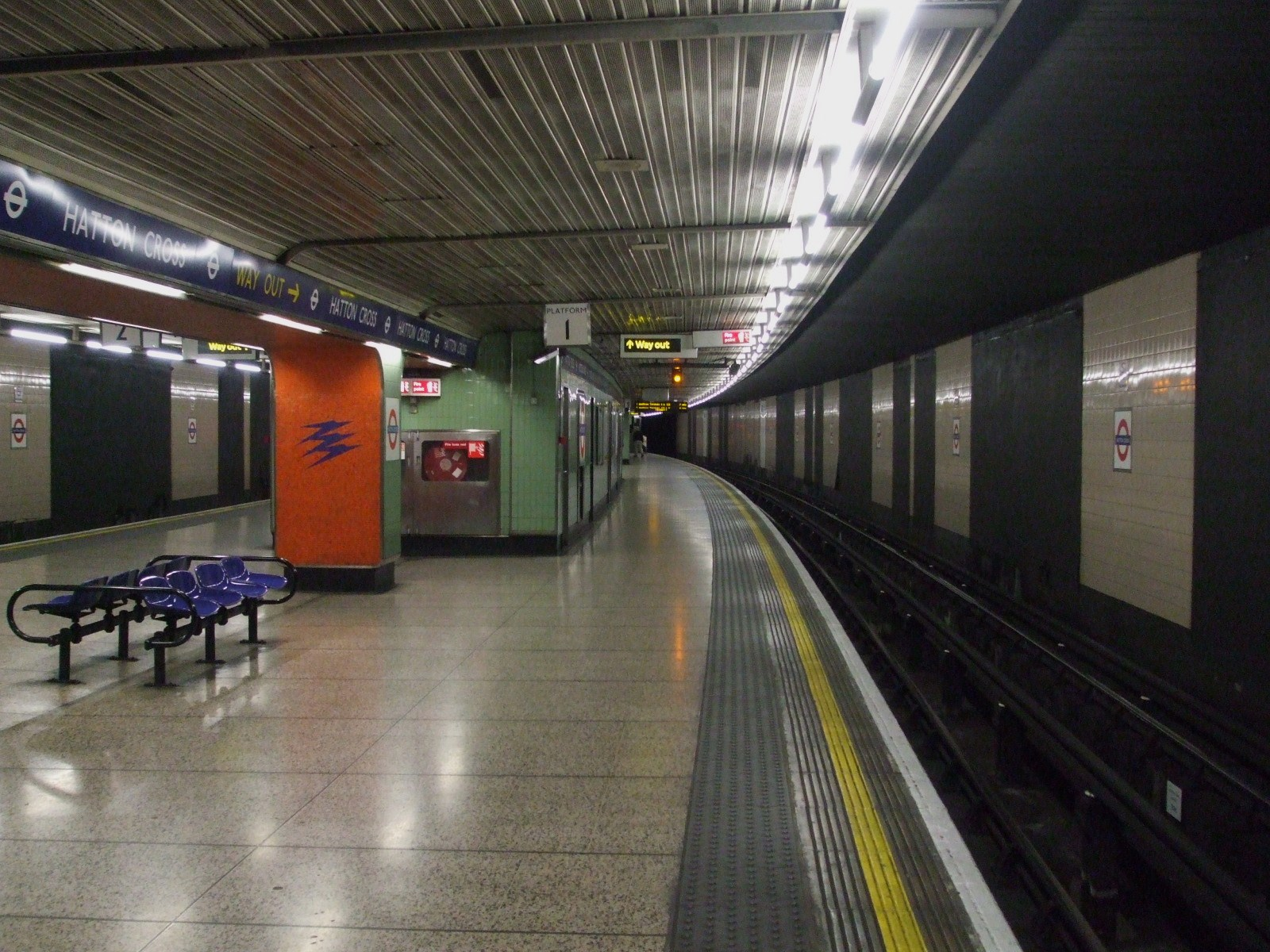
Hatton Cross tube station displaying three Speedbirds on a pillar.

As British Airways prepared for privatisation, a new corporate look was adopted in 1984, developed by Landor Associates. Referred to as the Speedwing, the red flash on the lower dark blue part of the fuselage bore a slight resemblance to the original 1930s design. The current Speedmarque ribbon bears a resemblance to the original Speedbird, but is simpler in design, being similar to the Landor Associates Speedwing. "Speedbird" continues to be used by British Airways as the ICAO callsign for its main international services. On its domestic services, it uses the callsign "Shuttle".

Hatton Cross tube station, which opened in 1975, features Speedbird tile artwork on its platform pillars, and has retained them from the station's opening to the present day.

In 2019, the Speedbird emblem returned to use by British Airways with the unveiling of their BOAC-liveried Boeing 747-400 to celebrate 100 years of BA and its predecessors.

== Design significance ==
Edward McKnight Kauffer's 1917 poster for the Daily Herald

Theyre Lee-Elliott was a graphic artist and painter working in London in the 1930s.

Lee-Elliott was influenced by Vorticism, particularly the work of Edward McKnight Kauffer. The logo echoes Kauffer's angular bird forms in his 1918 poster for the Daily Herald.

Other notable works by Lee-Elliott include posters for the London Underground and the Airmail logo. Many of his paintings and original artworks are in the collection of the Victoria and Albert Museum.

== Other Speedbirds ==
A somewhat different Speedbird logo was designed for Piedmont Airlines in 1948.

Speedbird House was an office block at Heathrow Airport. It was originally the headquarters of BOAC and, until the company moved, of British Airways.

Speedbird Way is a road near the Colnbrook Bypass, close to Heathrow Airport. It leads to the British Airways Headquarters 'Waterside'.

Speedbird is also the name of one of the British Airways Sailing Club yachts.

The Malliga MAL 04 Speedbird was a 2010s Austrian experimental high-speed monoplane.
